= Listed buildings in Odense Municipality =

This is a list of listed buildings in Odense Municipality, Denmark.

Note: This list is incomplete. A complete list of listed buildings in Odense Municipality can be found on Danish Wikipedia.

== The list ==
=== 5000 Odense C ===
| Listing name | Image | Location | Coordinates | Description |
|---|---|---|---|---|
| Albani Torv 11 (Ruinen på I. Vilh. Werners Plads) | | Albani Torv 11, 5000 Odense C | 55°23′47.53″N 10°23′22.15″E | The medieval part of building from c. 1500, It was originally located at Overgade 3 but has been moved |
| Bispens Lysthus | | Filosofgangen 10, 5000 Odense C | 55°23′34.33″N 10°23′8.67″E | |
| Gråbrødre Kloster | | Gråbrødre Plads 1, 5000 Odense C | | |
| Gråbrødre Kloster | | Gråbrødre Plads 1, 5000 Odense C | | |
| Gråbrødre Kloster | | Gråbrødre Plads 1, 5000 Odense C | | |
| Hans Christian Andersen Museum | | Bangs Boder 29, 5000 Odense C | | |
| Havnetoldkammeret | | Londongade 4, 5000 Odense C | 55°24′22.53″N 10°22′59.96″E | Custom house from 1834 by Jørgen Hansen Koch as well as the side wing and building on Strandgade from 1845 |
| Helvig Hardenberg House | | Nørregade 15, 5000 Odense C | | |
| Hovedpostbygningen, Den gamle Latinskole | | Lille Gråbrødrestr. 1, 5000 Odense C | | |
| Hunderupvej 34 | | Hunderupvej 34, 5000 Odense C | | |
| Gråbrødre Kloster | | Højbjergvej 140, 5200 Odense V | | |
| Gråbrødre Kloster | | Højbjergvej 140, 5200 Odense V | | |
| Gråbrødre Kloster | | Højbjergvej 140, 5200 Odense V | | |
| Gråbrødre Kloster | | Højbjergvej 140, 5200 Odense V | | |
| Gråbrødre Kloster | | Højbjergvej 140, 5200 Odense V | | |
| Gråbrødre Kloster | | Højbjergvej 140, 5200 Odense V | | |
| Lahns Stiftelse | | Nedergade 36, 5000 Odense C | | |
| Landsarkivet | | Jernbanegade 36A, 5000 Odense C | | |
| Landsarkivet | | Jernbanegade 36A, 5000 Odense C | | |
| Landsarkivet | | Jernbanegade 36A, 5000 Odense C | | |
| Odense Latin School | | Frue Kirkestræde 10, 5000 Odense C | 55°23′51.44″N 10°23′42.38″E | School building from the 17th century on a foundation from the Middle Ages which was adapted in 1860 and restored in 1955 by Axel Jacobsen |
| Museet, Falk Gøyes Gård, Ejler Rønnows Gård | | Overgade 48, 5000 Odense C | | |
| Museet, Falk Gøyes Gård, Ejler Rønnows Gård | | Overgade 48, 5000 Odense C | | |
| Museet, Falk Gøyes Gård, Ejler Rønnows Gård | | Overgade 48, 5000 Odense C | | |
| Nørregade 45 A-D | | Nørregade 45, 5000 Odense C | | |
| Odense Adelige Jomfrukloster | | Albani Torv 6, 5000 Odense C | | |
| Odense Palace | | Nørregade 36, 5000 Odense C | 55°23′54.5″N 10°23′15.53″E | Three-winged building complex |
| Odense Old Town Hall | | Klosterbakken 13, 5000 Odense C | | |
| Odense Tugthus | | Klosterbakken 13, 5000 Odense C | | |
| Oluf Bagers Mødrenegård, tidl. Amtstuegård | | Nørregade 29, 5000 Odense C | | |
| Overgade 19 | | Overgade 19, 5000 Odense C | | |
| Overgade 28 A-D | | Overgade 28A, 5000 Odense C | | |
| Overgade 28 E-H og 30 | | Overgade 28E, 5000 Odense C | | |
| Overgade 28 E-H og 30 | | Overgade 30, 5000 Odense C | | |
| Overgade 41 og Nedergade 24 | | Overgade 41, 5000 Odense C | | |
| Overgade 41 og Nedergade 24 | | Overgade 41B, 5000 Odense C | | |
| Overgade 41 og Nedergade 24 | | Nedergade 24 5000 Odense C | | |
| Overgade 60 | | Overgade 60, 5000 Odense C | | |
| Overgade 64 | | Overgade 64, 5000 Odense C | | |
| Overgade 66 | | Overgade 66, 5000 Odense C | | |
| Pagh House | | Overgade 24, 5000 Odense C | | |
| Sankt Clara Klostrets kælder | | Klaregade 17, 5000 Odense C | | |
| Sankt Clara Klostrets kælder | | Klaregade 25, 5000 Odense C | | |
| Sankt Hans Præstegård | | Nørregade 42, 5000 Odense C | | |
| Sankt Hans Præstegård | | Nørregade 42, 5000 Odense C | | |
| Sankt Knuds Kloster | | Klosterbakken 2, 5000 Odense C | 55°23′41.51″N 10°23′18.97″E | Monastery |
| Sukkergården | | Christiansgade 2, 5000 Odense C | | |
| Sukkergården | | Christiansgade 10, 5000 Odense C | | |
| Sukkergården | | Christiansgade 18, 5000 Odense C | | |
| Sukkergården | | Frederiksgade 2, 5000 Odense C | | |
| Thriges Kraftcentral | | Haubergsvej 1, 5000 Odense C | 55°24′22.78″N 10°23′18.59″E | Power station from 1915-16 by Niels Jacobsen |
| Vestergade 70 | | Vestergade 70, 5000 Odense C | | |
| Vestergade 73 | | Vestergade 73, 5000 Odense C | | |

=== 5220 Odense NV ===
| Listing name | Image | Location | Coordinates | Description |
|---|---|---|---|---|
| Korupvej 21 | | Korupvej 21, 5210 Odense NV | | |
| Korupvej 21 | | Korupvej 21, 5210 Odense NV | | |
| Korupvej 21 | | Korupvej 21, 5210 Odense NV | | |
| Korupvej 21 | | Korupvej 21, 5210 Odense NV | | |
| Korupvej 21 | | Korupvej 21, 5210 Odense NV | | |
| Korupvej 21 | | Korupvej 21, 5210 Odense NV | | |

=== 5220 Odense SØ ===
| Listing name | Image | Location | Coordinates | Description |
|---|---|---|---|---|
| Blangstedgaard | | Blangstedgårds Allé 92, 5220 Odense SØ | 55°22′52.64″N 10°26′44.08″E | Agerumsladen . Barn from the 18th century |
| Fraugdegård | | Fraugdegårds Allé 7, 5220 Odense SØ | 55°16′9.19″N 9°53′29.39″E | Main building from c. c. 1588 |
| Hollufgård | | Hollufgårds Allé 6, 5220 Odense SØ | | |
| Hollufgård | | Hollufgårds Allé 6, 5220 Odense SØ | | |
| Hollufgård | | Hollufgårds Allé 6, 5220 Odense SØ | | |
| Hollufgård | | Hollufgårds Allé 6, 5220 Odense SØ | | |
| Hollufgård | | Hollufgårds Allé 6, 5220 Odense SØ | | Icehouse. |
| Sanderumgård, Tankefuld og Sommerlyst | | Sanderumgårdvej 150, 5220 Odense SØ | | |
| Sanderumgård, Tankefuld og Sommerlyst | | Sanderumgårdvej 150, 5220 Odense SØ | | |

=== 5240 Odense NØ ===
| Listing name | Image | Location | Coordinates | Description |
|---|---|---|---|---|
| Bankegården | | Ryttervejen 12, 5240 Odense NØ | | |
| Bankegården | | Ryttervejen 12, 5240 Odense NØ | | |
| Bankegården | | Ryttervejen 12, 5240 Odense NØ | | |
| Bankegården | | Ryttervejen 12, 5240 Odense NØ | | |
| Brejngård, Åsum Bygade 15 | | Åsum Bygade 15, 5240 Odense NØ | | |
| Brejngård, Åsum Bygade 15 | | Åsum Bygade 15, 5240 Odense NØ | | |
| Brejngård, Åsum Bygade 15 | | Åsum Bygade 15, 5240 Odense NØ | | |
| Brejngård, Åsum Bygade 15 | | Åsum Bygade 15, 5240 Odense NØ | | |
| Brejngård, Åsum Bygade 15 | | Åsum Bygade 15, 5240 Odense NØ | | |
| Brejngård, Åsum Bygade 15 | | Åsum Bygade 15, 5240 Odense NØ | | |
| Seden Hospital | | Mindelundsvej 59, 5240 Odense NØ | | |
| Åsum gamle Smedie | | Staupudevej 2, 5240 Odense NØ | | |

=== 5250 Odense SV ===
| Listing name | Image | Location | Coordinates | Description |
|---|---|---|---|---|
| Dalum Kloster | | Dalumvej 105, 5250 Odense SV | | |
| Dalum Kloster | | Dalumvej 105, 5250 Odense SV | | |
| Dalum Kloster | | Dalumvej 105, 5250 Odense SV | | |
| Dalum Kloster | | Dalumvej 105, 5250 Odense SV | | |
| Møllegyden 18 | | Møllegyden 18, 5250 Odense SV | | North wing. |
| Møllegyden 18 | | Møllegyden 18, 5250 Odense SV | | Stable wing (east wing). |
| Møllegyden 18 | | Møllegyden 18, 5250 Odense SV | | Barn (south wing). |
| Møllegyden 18 | | Møllegyden 18, 5250 Odense SV | | |
| Møllegyden 18 | | Møllegyden 18, 5250 Odense SV | | Kværnehuset, extension of the west wing. |
| Møllegyden 18 | | Møllegyden 18, 5250 Odense SV | | Free-standing pork stable situated to the east of the other buildings. |
| Møllegyden 18 | | Møllegyden 18, 5250 Odense SV | | |
| Møllegyden 18 | | Møllegyden 18, 5250 Odense SV | | Rool shed, extension of the south wing. |
| Fruens Bøge Station | | Fruens Bøge Skov 4, 5250 Odense SV | 55°22′11.02″N 10°22′39.51″E | Station building from 1876 by H.A.W. Haugsted |
| Fruens Bøge Station | | Fruens Bøge Skov 4, 5250 Odense SV | 55°22′11.02″N 10°22′39.51″E | Warehouse from 1876 by H.A.W. Haugsted |
| Vosemose Gård | | Vosemosevej 10, 5250 Odense SV | | |
| Vosemose Gård | | Vosemosevej 10, 5250 Odense SV | | |
| Vosemose Gård | | Vosemosevej 10, 5250 Odense SV | | |

=== 5260 Odense S ===
| Listing name | Image | Location | Coordinates | Description |
|---|---|---|---|---|
| Lindved | | Lindvedvej 75, 5260 Odense S | | |
| Lindved | | Lindvedvej 75, 5260 Odense S | | |

=== 5270 Odense N ===
| Listing name | Image | Location | Coordinates | Description |
|---|---|---|---|---|
| Lumby Mølle | | Slettensvej 292, 5270 Odense N | | |
| Lumby Mølle | | Slettensvej 294, 5270 Odense N | | |
| Lumby Mølle | | Slettensvej 294, 5270 Odense N | | |

== Delisted buildings ==
| Listing name | Image | Location | Coordinates | Description |
|---|---|---|---|---|
| Tarup gamle Præstegård | | Præstegårdsvænget 51, 5210 Odense NV | | |
