= Prince Christian of Hesse =

German prince

Prince Christian
- Prince Christian of Hesse
- Born: 14 August 1776; Gottorp Castle, Duchy of Schleswig
- Died: 14 November 1814 (aged 38); Odense Palace, Odense, Denmark
- Burial: Schleswig Cathedral
- House: Hesse-Kassel
- Father: Prince Charles of Hesse-Kassel
- Mother: Princess Louise of Denmark

Prince Christian of Hesse (Danish: Christian af Hessen; German: Christian von Hessen) (14 August 1776 – 14 November 1814) was a German prince and member of the House of Hesse-Kassel. As a son of the Danish Field Marshal Prince Charles of Hesse-Kassel and Princess Louise of Denmark, he was a member of the extended Danish Royal Family and spent his entire life in Denmark.

== Early life ==
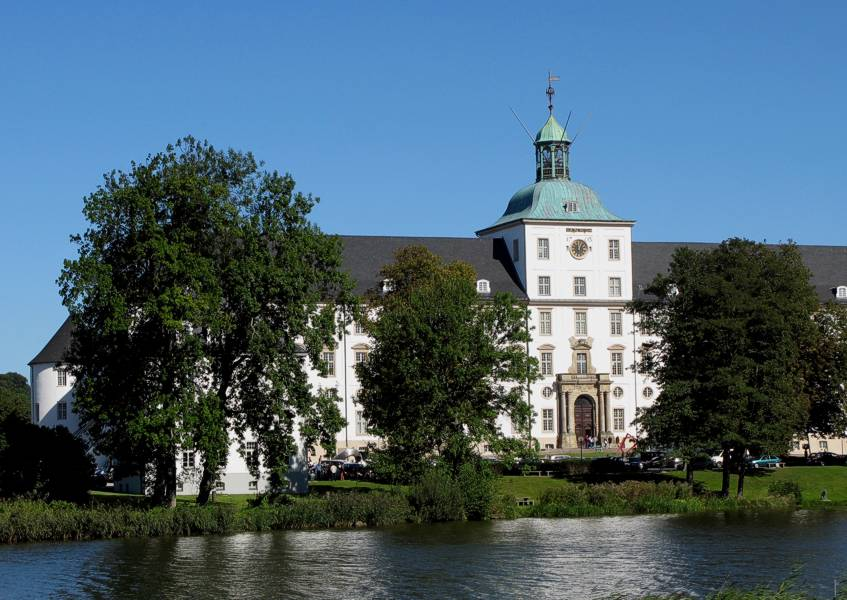
Gottorp Castle

Prince Christian was born at Gottorp Castle, Schleswig as the third son of Prince Charles of Hesse-Kassel, royal governor of the twin duchies of Schleswig and Holstein, and Princess Louise of Denmark, herself a daughter of King Frederick V of Denmark.

As a member of the extended Danish Royal Family, Christian was destined for a military career in Denmark from a young age. He was appointed Colonel in 1783, Major General in 1789 and in 1790 Commander of a Regiment. In 1803 he was appointed knight of the Order of the Elephant. In 1805 he was put in charge of a cavalry brigade in Holstein, and as such accompanied his cousin King Frederick VI of Denmark to Copenhagen. In 1808 he assisted in suppressing the unrest of the Spanish auxiliary troops in Roskilde and was appointed Lieutenant General the following year. In 1809 he was appointed commanding General on the island of Funen. Finally, in 1812 he was made a General in the cavalry.

== Engagement ==
In September 1812, Christian was engaged to his niece, Princess Caroline of Denmark, daughter of King Frederick VI of Denmark and Christian's sister, Marie Sophie of Hesse-Kassel.

== Death ==
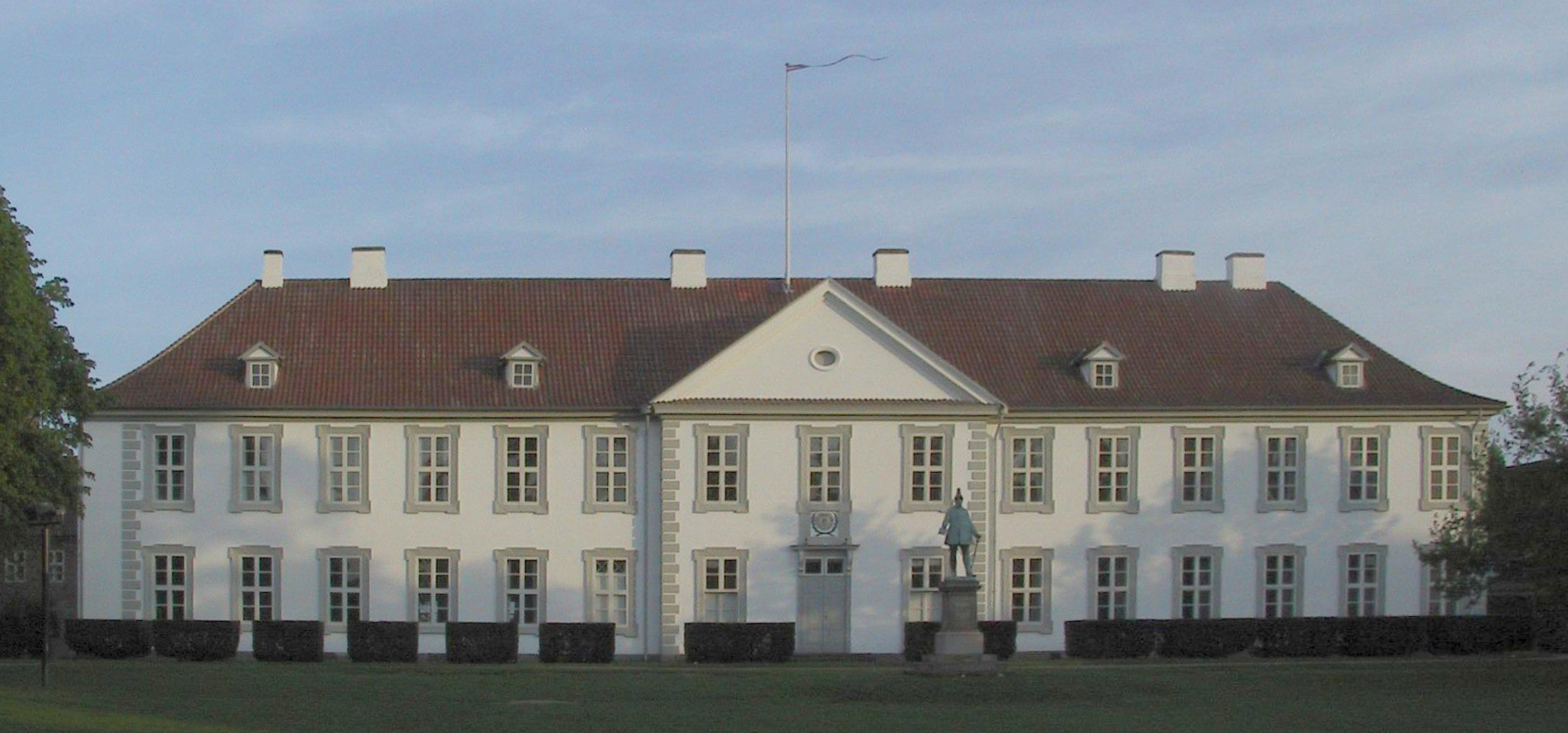
Odense Palace

Already at the time of his engagement, Prince Christian was weakened. A year after the engagement, he suffered a breakdown in Odense Palace. Shortly after it became clear that he was mentally ill, suffering from frequent fits. He died on 14 November 1814 at the age of 38 in Odense Palace, Denmark. He was buried in the Church of Saint John in Odense, but in 1862 his remains were transferred to Schleswig Cathedral.
