= Christian of Hesse =

Christian of Hesse may refer to:

- Christian, Landgrave of Hesse-Wanfried-Rheinfels (1689–1755)
- Prince Christian of Hesse-Darmstadt (1763–1830)
- Prince Christian of Hesse-Kassel (1776–1814)
- Prince Christian of Hesse-Philippsthal-Barchfeld (1887–1971)
