= Prince Charles of Hesse-Kassel =

German-Danish prince and general (1744–1836)

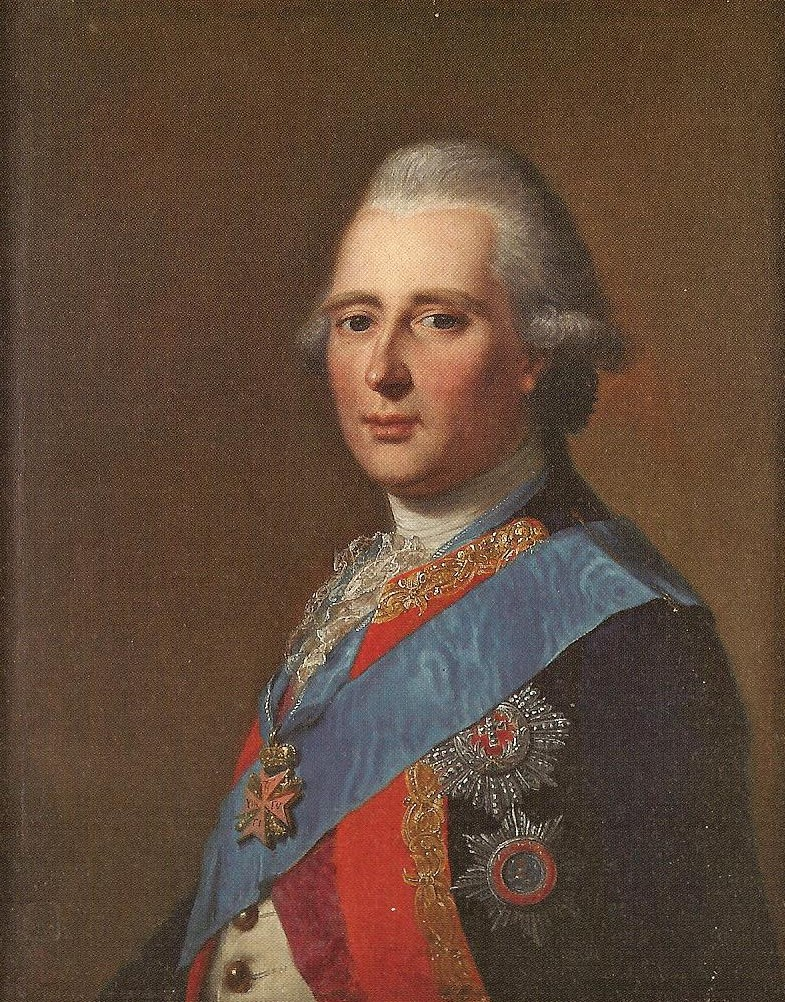
- Prince Charles wearing the sash of the Order of the Elephant
- Born: 19 December 1744; Kassel, Hesse
- Died: 17 August 1836 (aged 91); Louisenlund, Schleswig
- Burial: Schleswig Cathedral
- Spouse: Princess Louise of Denmark (m. 1766; died 1831)
- Issue: Marie Sophie, Queen of Denmark and Norway; Prince Wilhelm; Prince Frederick; Princess Juliane; Prince Christian; Louise Caroline, Duchess of Schleswig-Holstein-Sonderburg-Glücksburg
- House: Hesse-Kassel
- Father: Frederick II, Landgrave of Hesse-Kassel
- Mother: Princess Mary of Great Britain

Prince Charles of Hesse-Kassel (Danish: Carl, German and Norwegian: Karl; 19 December 1744 – 17 August 1836) was a cadet member of the house of Hesse-Kassel and a Danish general field marshal. Brought up with relatives at the Danish court, he spent most of his life in Denmark, serving as royal governor of the twin duchies of Schleswig-Holstein from 1769 to 1836 and commander-in-chief of the Norwegian army from 1772 to 1814.

== Early life ==
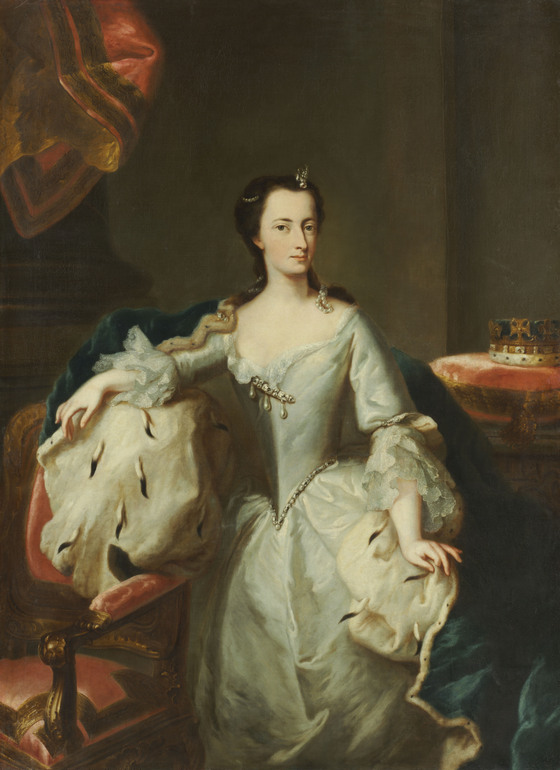
Prince Charles' mother, Princess Mary of Great Britain

Charles was born in Kassel on 19 December 1744 as the second surviving son of Hesse-Kassel's then hereditary prince, the future Frederick II, Landgrave of Hesse-Kassel, and his first wife Princess Mary of Great Britain. His mother was a daughter of King George II of Great Britain and Princess Caroline of Ansbach and a sister of Queen Louise of Denmark.

His father, the future landgrave (who reigned from 1760 and died in 1785), left the family in 1747 and converted to Catholicism in 1749. In 1755 he formally ended the marriage with Mary. The grandfather, William VIII, Landgrave of Hesse, granted the county of Hanau and its revenues to Mary and her sons.

The young Prince Charles and his two brothers, William and Frederick, were raised by their mother and fostered by Protestant relatives since 1747.

In 1756, Mary moved to Denmark to look after her sister Louise's children. She took her own children with her and they were raised at the royal court at Christiansborg Palace in Copenhagen. The Hessian princes later remained in Denmark, becoming important lords and royal functionaries. Only the eldest brother William returned to Hesse, in 1785, upon ascending the landgraviate.

== Early career ==
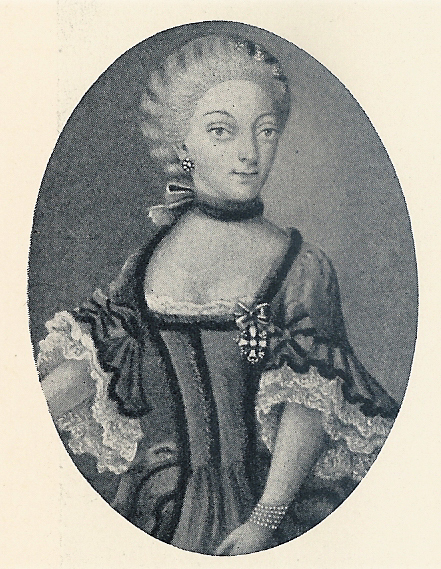
Charles' wife, Princess Louise of Denmark

Charles began a military career in Denmark–Norway. In 1758 he was appointed colonel, at the age of 20 major general and in 1765 was put in charge of the artillery. After his cousin, King Christian VII, acceded to the throne in 1766, he was appointed lieutenant general, commander of the Royal Guard, knight of the Order of the Elephant and member of the Privy Council.

In 1766, he was appointed Governor-general of Norway as successor to Jacob Benzon (1688–1775). He held the position until 1770 but which remained mostly titular, as he never went to Norway during this period.

In 1763, his elder brother William married their first cousin, Danish-Norwegian Princess Caroline. Charles followed suit on 30 August 1766 at Christiansborg Palace — his wife was Louise of Denmark, and Charles thus became brother-in-law to his cousin, King Christian VII. The marriage took place despite advice given against it, due to many accusations of debauchery by Prince Charles and the poor influence he had on the King.

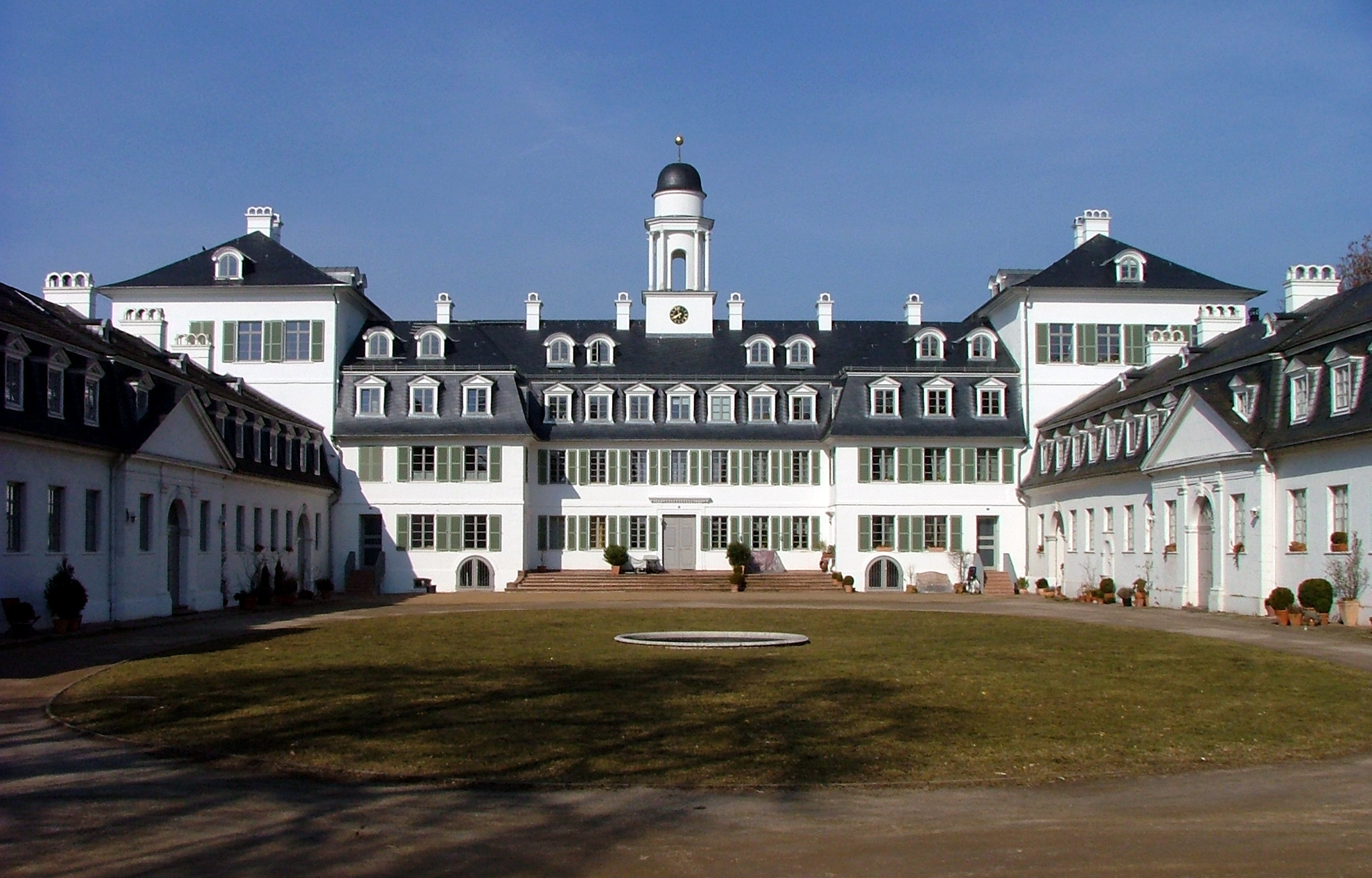
Rumpenheim Palace, Offenbach

Shortly after, Charles fell into disfavour at court, and in early 1767 he and Louise left Copenhagen to live with his mother in the county of Hanau. They would have their first child, Marie Sophie, there in 1767 and then their second child, William, in 1769.

In 1768, Charles purchased the landed property and village of Offenbach-Rumpenheim from the Edelsheim family. In 1771 he had the manor expanded into a castle and princely seat. His mother Mary lived in the palace until her death in 1772. In 1781, Charles sold the Rumpenheim Castle to his younger brother, Frederick.

== Governor of Schleswig-Holstein ==
In 1769, Prince Charles of Hesse was appointed royal Governor of the twin duchies of Schleswig and Holstein (initially only the royal share, so-called Holstein-Glückstadt before in 1773 the king also acquired the ducal share in Holstein) on behalf of the government of his brother-in-law, King Christian VII of Denmark and Norway. Charles took up residence at Gottorp Castle in Schleswig with his family. They would have their third child Frederick there in 1771.

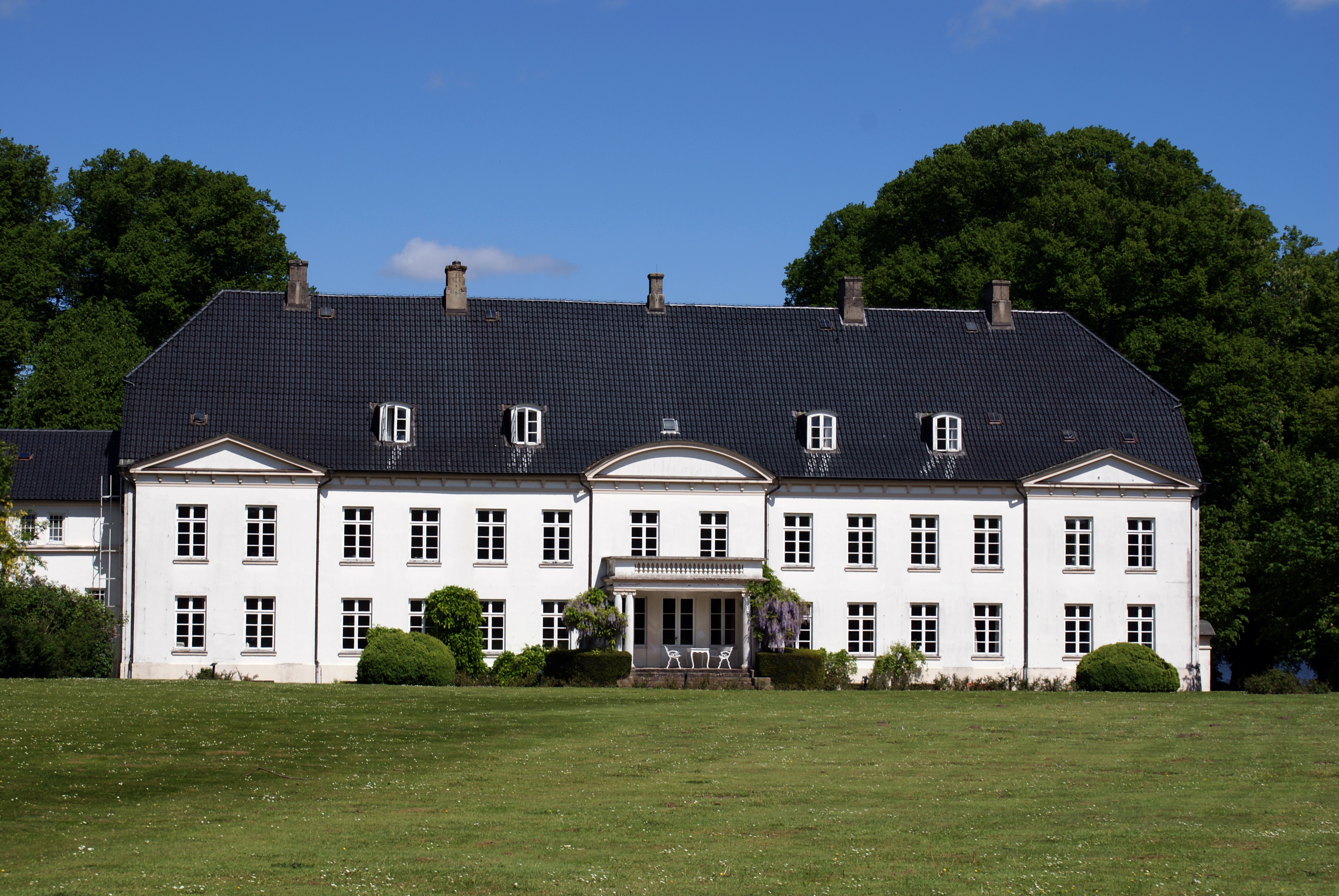
Louisenlund

In 1770, King Christian VII gave his sister the estate of Tegelhof in Güby between the City of Schleswig and Eckernförde. From 1772 to 1776, Charles had a summer residence constructed on the site which he named Louisenlund in honour of his wife.

== Commander-in-chief of the Norwegian army ==
In September 1772, Charles was appointed commander-in-chief of the Norwegian army and he and Louise moved to Christiana. The assignment was a consequence of the coup d'état of King Gustav III of Sweden on 19 August 1772 and the subsequent prospect of war with Sweden. While in Norway, Princess Louise gave birth to their fourth child Juliane in 1773. Even though Charles returned to Schleswig-Holstein in 1774, he continued to function as commander-in-chief of the Norwegian army until 1814. At the time of his return from Norway, he was appointed field marshal.

During the War of the Bavarian Succession in 1778–79, he acted as a volunteer in the army of Frederick the Great and gained the trust of the Prussian king. Once, when Frederick was speaking against Christianity, he noticed a lack of sympathy of Charles' part. In response to an inquiry from the king, Charles said, "Sire, I am not more sure of having the honour of seeing you, than I am that Jesus Christ existed and died for us as our Saviour on the cross." After a moment of surprised silence, Frederick declared, "You are the first man who has ever declared such a belief in my hearing."

In 1788, the Swedish attack on Russia during the Russo-Swedish War forced Denmark–Norway to declare war on Sweden in accordance with its 1773 treaty obligations to Russia. Prince Charles was put in command of a Norwegian army which briefly invaded Sweden through Bohuslän and won the Battle of Kvistrum Bridge. The army was closing in on Gothenburg, when peace was signed on 9 July 1789 following the diplomatic intervention of Great Britain and Prussia, bringing this so-called Lingonberry War to an end. On 12 November, the Norwegian army retreated back to Norway. During the retreat, the Danish-Norwegian army lost 1,500–3,000 men to hunger, disease, poor sanitary conditions, and exposure to continual autumn rainfall. Prince Charles was later criticised for his direction of the campaign and although he continued to function as commander-in-chief, he had lost his popularity in Norway.

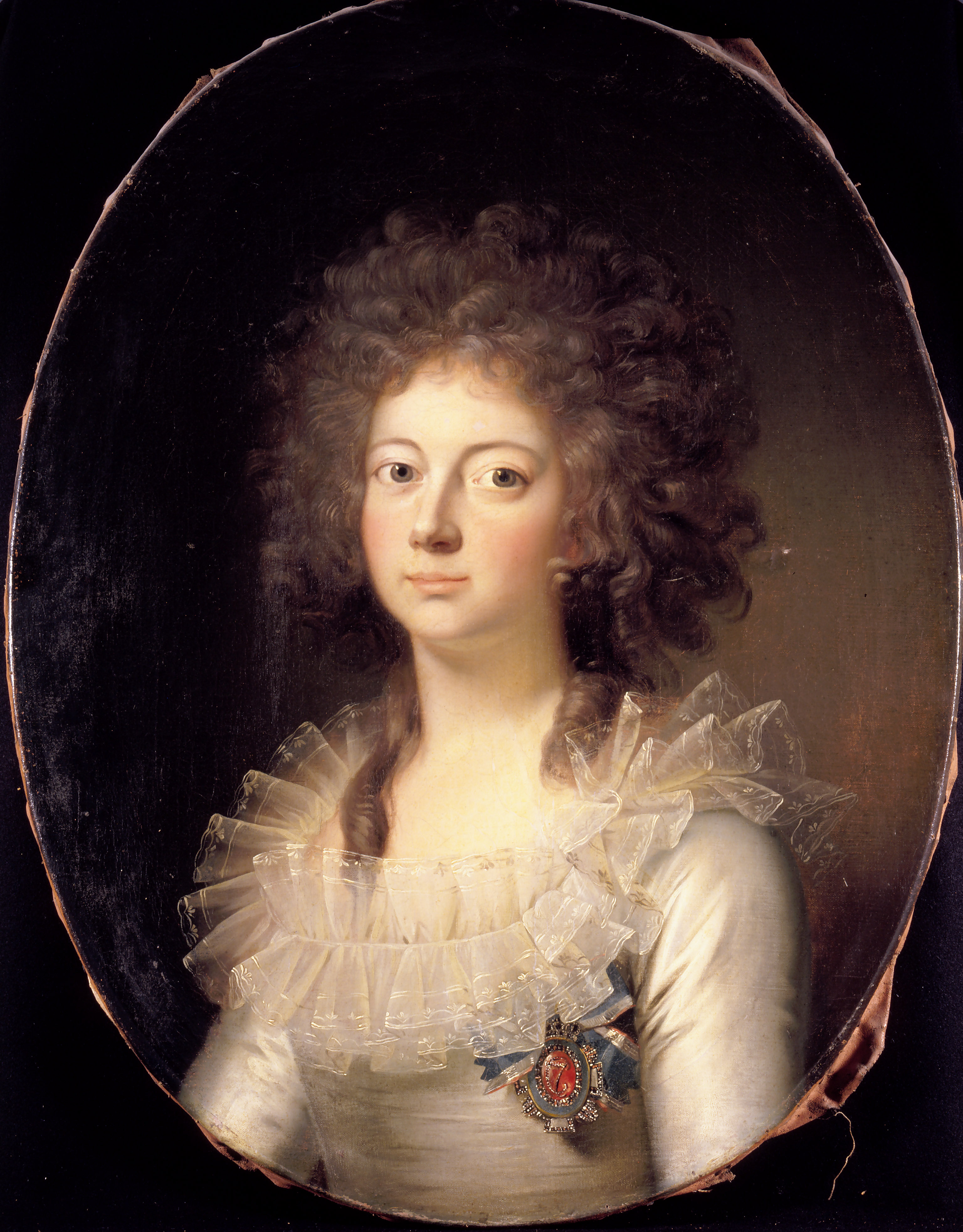
Charles' daughter Marie Sophie, later Queen Consort of Denmark and Norway

When the crown prince and regent of Denmark–Norway, the future Frederick VI married Charles's eldest daughter Marie Sophie in 1790, he made several unsuccessful attempts at substantially influencing decisions of the government and the regent.

== Freemasonry ==
Freemasonry gained official recognition in Denmark–Norway through Charles. He was the founder of numerous Masonic lodges and Master of the Chair of the four united Hamburg lodges of the Rite of Strict Observance, in which he held the office of coadjutor alongside the Grand Master, Duke Ferdinand von Braunschweig, and later took over his position. In 1796, Karl von Hessen succeeded Duke Ferdinand, who had died in 1792, as Grand Master and head of the “Rectified Scottish Rite” (name of the Strict Observance after the Wilhelmsbad Convention), a position he held until his death in 1836.

After the Napoleonic Wars, he took the Masonic lodges Zur aufgehenden Morgenröte in Frankfurt am Main and Zu den vereinigten Freunden in Mainz, which were founded by the Grand Orient de France and consisted mainly of Jewish members, under his protection, granted them a new constitution, and even obtained a patent for the Christian Scottish High Degrees for the Zur aufgehenden Morgenröte lodge. In 1816 and 1817 was involved in the founding of multiple Lodges in Mainz, Bad Homburg and Frankfurt. He was deeply committed to the interests of “his” lodges in Frankfurt and Mainz.

Charles was an alchemist and Rosicrucian with a keen interest in secret teachings. During the decline of Strict Observance after the Wilhelmsbad Masonic Convention from July 16 to September 1, 1782, he, like Duke Ferdinand of Brunswick, became one of the most important members of the Order of the Illuminati. He was also the Grand master of the Asiatic Brethren and a member of the Order of the Golden and Rosy Cross.

== Later life ==
Charles was a remarkable patron of theater and opera. He had his own court theater in Schleswig, and he involved himself extensively in its operations.

During the French Revolutionary Wars, he was in command of the army which briefly occupied Hamburg and Lübeck in 1801.

On 25 January 1805, Charles was granted the title "Landgrave of Hesse" by his elder brother, who had assumed the higher dignity and title of Imperial Prince-Elector.

In 1807, the manor and village of Gereby by the Schlei near Kappeln in Schwansen was renamed Carlsburg in honour of Prince Charles. Charles had purchased the property of Gereby in 1785, where he abolished serfdom in 1790.

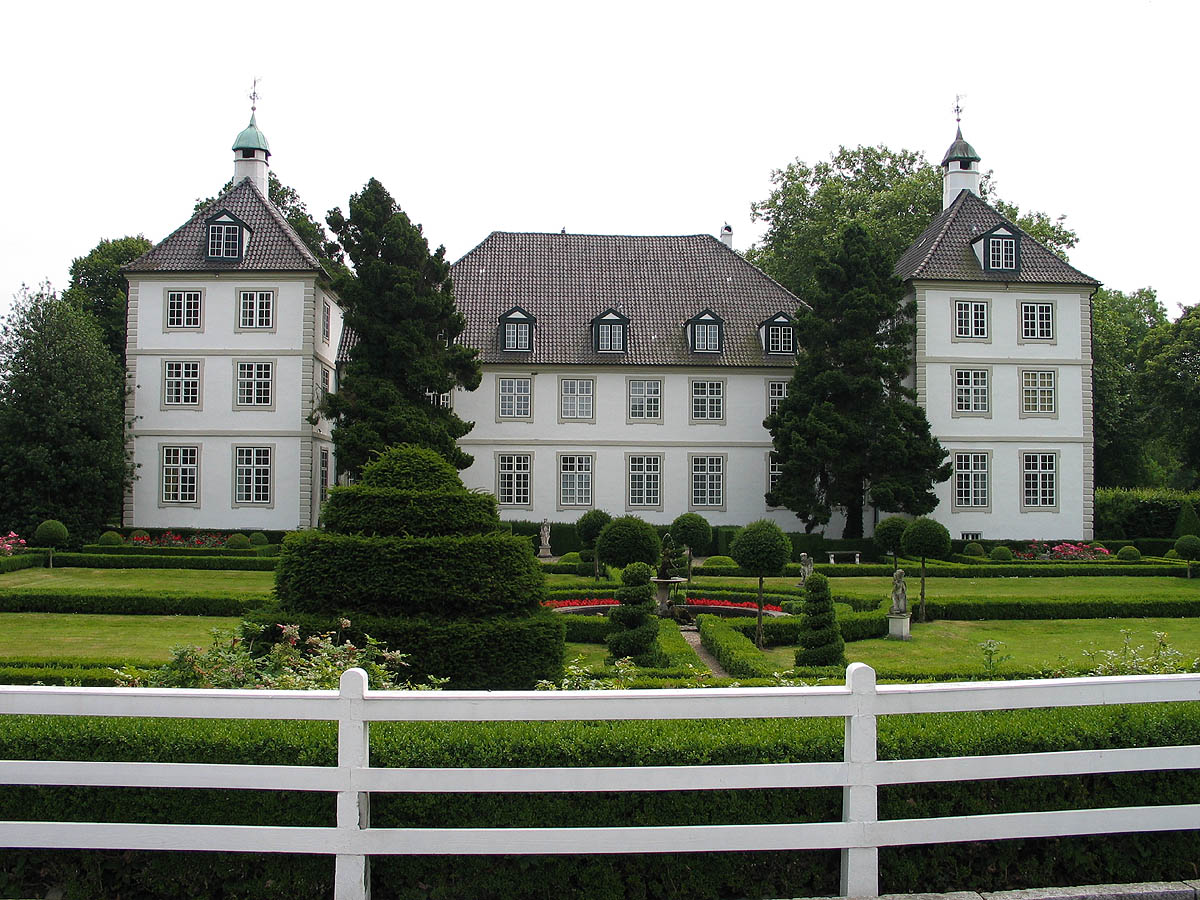
Panker Estate

Following the death of his father's first cousin, prince Friedrich Wilhelm von Hessenstein, he inherited the estate of Panker in Holstein in 1808.

In 1814, after the dissolution of Denmark–Norway, he lost the position of commander-in-chief of the Norwegian army, but was appointed general field marshal of the Danish army. In 1816 he became Grand Commander of the Order of the Dannebrog.

Prince Charles died on 17 August 1836 in the castle of Louisenlund in Güby, Schleswig.

== Marriage and issue ==
On 30 August 1766 at Christiansborg Palace in Copenhagen, Charles married Princess Louise of Denmark, his first cousin, the youngest daughter of his aunt, Princess Louise of Great Britain, and King Frederick V of Denmark and Norway, who died the same year. The couple had the following children:

- Marie Sophie, Princess of Hesse (20 October 1767 – 21 March 1852), married on 31 July 1790 her first cousin the future King Frederick VI of Denmark and Norway
- Wilhelm, Prince of Hesse (15 January 1769 – 14 July 1772)
- Prince Frederik of Hesse (24 May 1771 – 24 February 1845), Governor-general of Norway, married only morganatically Clarelia Dorothea (Klara) von Brockdorff (1778–1836), daughter of Ditlev von Brockdorff (1708–1790) and his second wife, Henriette Friederike von Blome (b. 1745). Frederik was a general and royal governor.
- Juliane, Princess of Hesse (19 January 1773 – 11 March 1860), Protestant Abbess of the Itzehoe Monastery
- Prince Christian of Hesse (14 August 1776 – 14 November 1814)
- Princess Louise Caroline of Hesse-Kassel (28 September 1789 – 13 March 1867), married on 28 January 1810 Friedrich Wilhelm, Duke of Schleswig-Holstein-Sonderburg-Glücksburg

Princess Louise died at Gottorp Castle on 12 January 1831.

== Ancestry ==
Ancestors of Prince Charles of Hesse-Kassel

8. Charles I, Landgrave of Hesse-Kassel
4. William VIII, Landgrave of Hesse-Kassel
9. Maria Amalia of Courland
2. Frederick II, Landgrave of Hesse-Kassel
10. Moritz Wilhelm, Duke of Saxe-Zeitz
5. Dorothea Wilhelmine of Saxe-Zeitz
11. Marie Amalie of Brandenburg
1. Prince Charles of Hesse-Kassel
12. George I of Great Britain
6. George II of Great Britain
13. Sophia Dorothea of Celle
3. Princess Mary of Great Britain
14. John Frederick, Margrave of Brandenburg-Ansbach
7. Caroline of Ansbach
15. Princess Eleonore Erdmuthe of Saxe-Eisenach
