= Museum Odense =

Self-governing museum institution in Odense, Denmark

Museum Odense (Until 2022: Odense City Museums, Danish: Odense Bys Museer) is a self-governing museum institution in Odense, Denmark.

The first Museum in Odense opened in 1860 under the name Nordisk Museum in Odense Palace. During 1885 it moved to a newly erected building, a few hundred meters from Odense Palace – this building today houses the Funen Art Museum, was renamed to Museum Civitatis Othiniensis and came under municipal administration. In 1904 the name changed to Fyns Stiftsmuseum.

During the next many years new museums opened (and closed), got renamed and moved around. Starting in 1997, Odense City Museums has been run as one museum with the formerly independent museums around the city as departments. In 2018 the museum organisation became a self-governing organisation. And in september 2022 the name was changed from Odense City Museums to Museum Odense.

== Museums ==
- Hans Christian Andersen House (H.C. Andersen Museum, H.C. Andersens Hus), The main, original 1908, museum for the author H.C. Andersen, rebuilt by Kengo Kuma in 2021. The museum site includes the original house where Andersen was born.
- Hans Christian Andersen's Childhood Home (H.C. Andersens Barndomshjem). The house where the danish author Hans Christian Andersen lived from he was 2–14 years old.
- The Funen Village (Den Fynske Landsby) – open-air museum with original buildings from 19th century
- Carl Nielsen Museum (Carl Nielsen Museet) – Museum for the composer Carl Nielsen
- Carl Nielsen's Childhood home (Carl Nielsens Barndomshjem) – The house in Nørre Lyndelse, Denmark where the composer Carl Nielsen grew up
- Møntergården (Møntergården) – Contains the remains of the Koelbjerg Man (c. 8,000 BC), the oldest known bog body and human remains found in Denmark.
- Thriges Kraftcentral – the power station for Thomas B. Thrige's factory
