= Thomas B. Thrige =

Danish entrepreneur, industrialist and businessman

Thomas Barfoed Thrige (5 May 1866 – 9 May 1938) was a Danish entrepreneur, industrialist and businessman. In 1894, he started the company Thomas B. Thrige, a manufacturer of electric motors, now known as T-T Electric (formerly Thrige Electric and Thrige-Titan). The power station of his factory in Odense is now the Thriges Kraftcentral museum run by Odense City Museums.

He and his wife formed the Thomas B. Thrige Foundation in 1934 to ensure the continuation of his business. The foundation grants donations to the Danish business community, primarily the trades and industries.

== Personal life ==
Thomas Barfoed Thrige was born in Odense on 5 May 1866 to parents Carl Mathias Thrige, a teacher, and Ingeborg Thrige. He married Ingeborg Nanna Rasmussen.

Thrige died 9 May 1938 at the age of 72; he is buried at the Assistens Cemetery in Odense.
