= Det Kvindelige Velgørende Selskab =

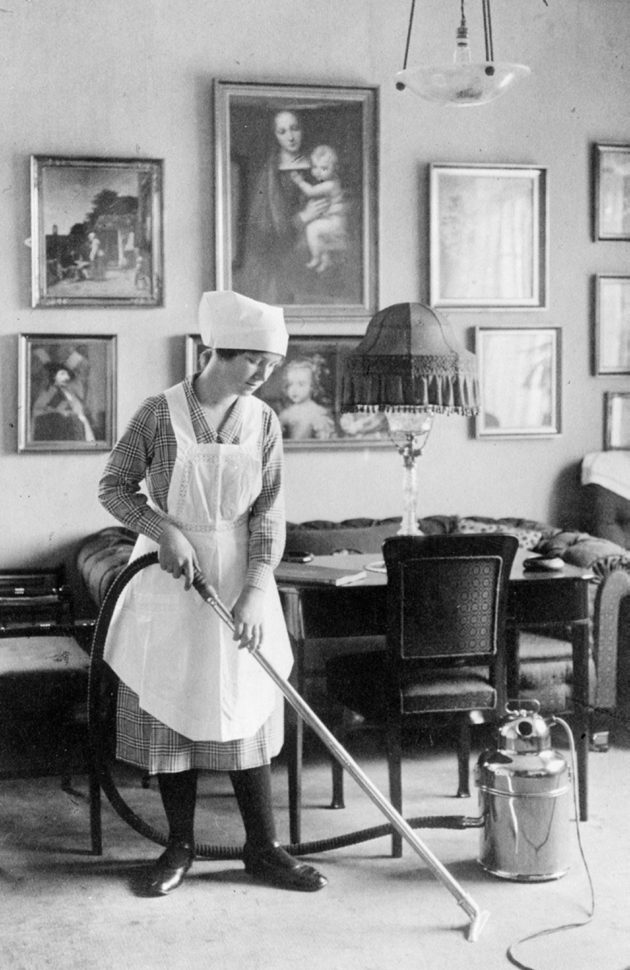
- housemaid cleaning in Denmark, 1912
- Formation: 1815
- Dissolved: 28 October 2004
- Type: organization
- Headquarters: Copenhagen, Denmark
- Methods: awardings
- Official language: Danish

Det Kvindelige Velgørende Selskab ("The Female Charitable Society") was an organization in Denmark, established in 1815 when king Frederick VI of Denmark had been inspired while visiting the Congress of Vienna in Austria, and finally disestablished on 28 October 2004 following a meeting inside the Garrison Church in Copenhagen.

Queen Marie of Denmark was appointed protector of the organization, a position which was then held by someone from the Danish royal family. Queen Marie's birthday was always celebrated as an observance by the organization. They gave awards to domestic workers who had been in long-time service, while most others of them left by the age of 25-30 to form their own family. The organization ran a school for housemaid girls. In 1828, they also opened Denmark's first daycare center.

The organization was disestablished as their activity had been outdated, even if the housemaid girls at some places had been replaced by modern nanny girls.

When the organization was disestablished, Niels Gustav Bardenfleth published the book For lang og tro tjeneste. Det Kvindelige Velgørende Selskab 1815-2004.
