= Princess Louise of Denmark (1750–1831) =

Louise of Denmark
- Princess Charles of Hesse-Kassel
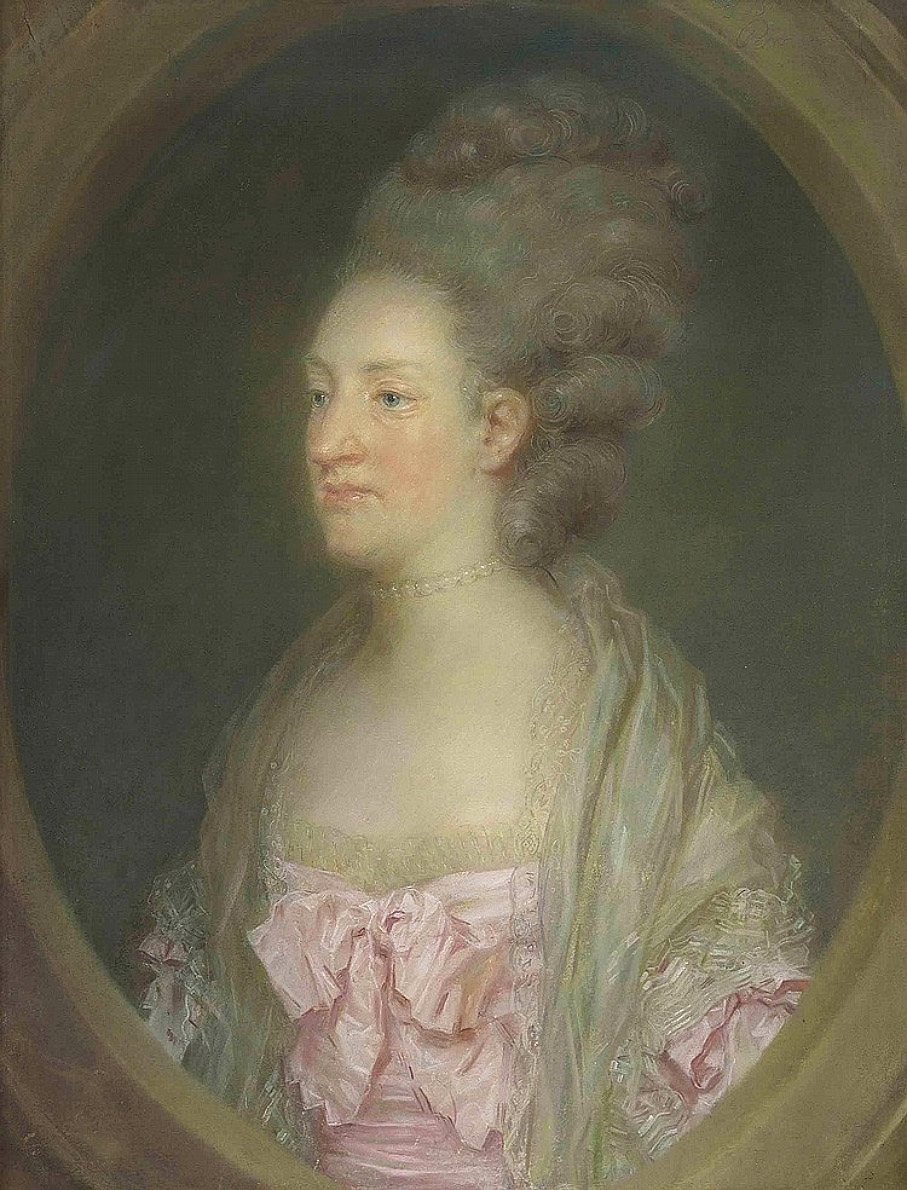
- Pastel by Jean-Baptiste Perronneau
- Born: 30 January 1750; Christiansborg Castle, Copenhagen
- Died: 12 January 1831 (aged 80); Gottorp Castle, Schleswig
- Burial: Schleswig Cathedral
- Spouse: Prince Charles of Hesse-Kassel (m. 1766)
- Issue: Marie, Queen of Denmark and Norway; Prince Frederick Prince Christian; Louise Caroline, Duchess of Schleswig-Holstein-Sonderburg-Glücksburg
- House: Oldenburg
- Father: Frederik V of Denmark
- Mother: Princess Louise of Great Britain

Princess Louise of Denmark and Norway (Danish: Louise af Danmark og Norge; 30 January 1750 – 12 January 1831) was born to Frederick V of Denmark and Louise of Great Britain. Her eldest daughter, Marie of Hesse-Kassel, was the wife of Frederick VI of Denmark. Through her youngest daughter, Louise Caroline, she was also the maternal grandmother of Christian IX of Denmark.

== Early life ==
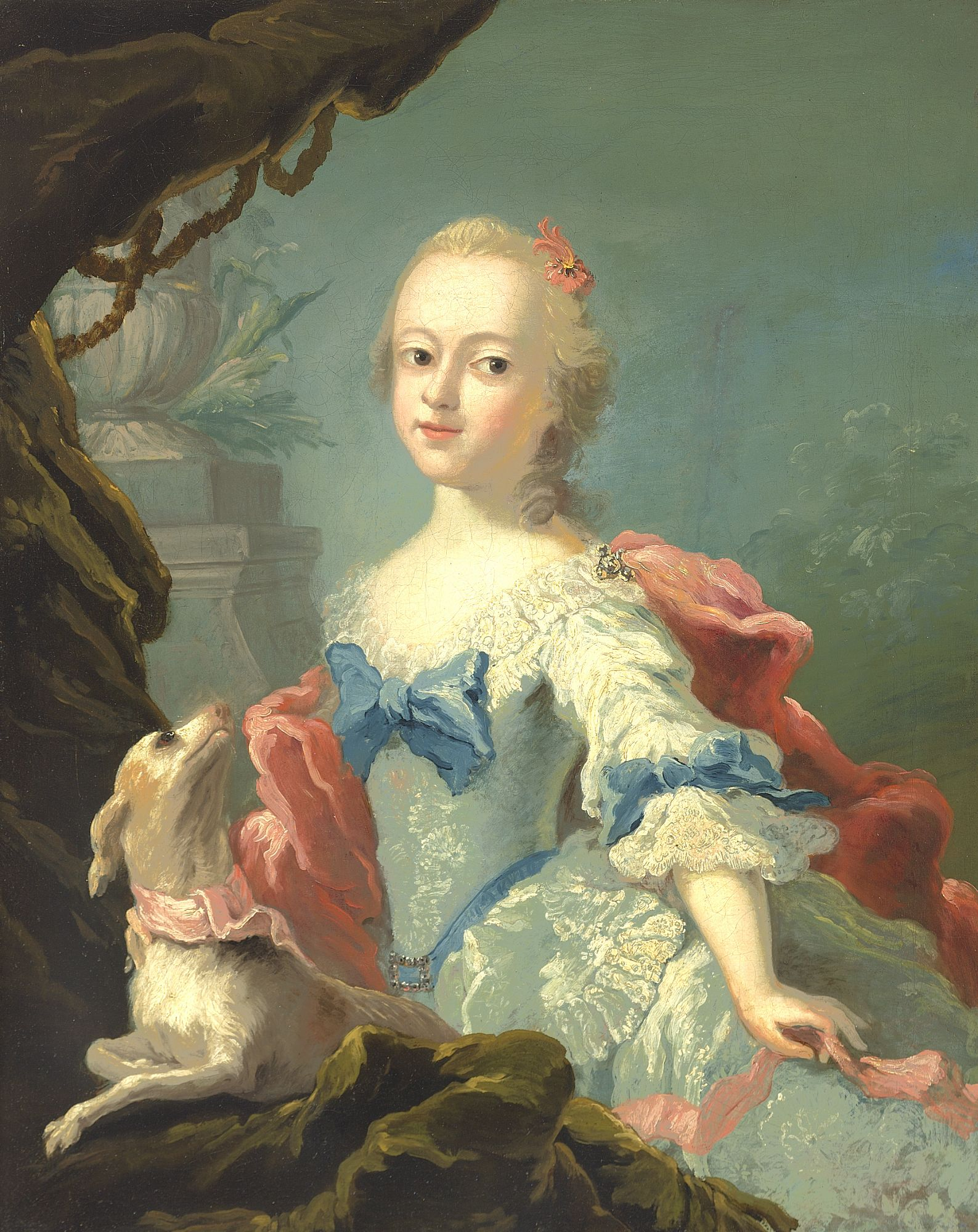
Portrait of Princess Louise as child by Peder Als, 1760s.

Princess Louise was born on 30 January 1750 at Christiansborg Palace, the principal residence of the Danish Monarchy in central Copenhagen. She was a daughter to Frederick V, King of Denmark and Norway, and his first wife Louise of Great Britain. At birth, Louise had two older sisters, Princess Sophia Magdalena and Princess Wilhelmina Caroline, and an older brother Crown Prince Christian. In 1751, one year after Louise's birth, her mother Queen Louise died during her sixth pregnancy, just aged 27 years. The following year her father remarried to Duchess Juliana Maria of Brunswick-Wolfenbüttel, who gave birth to Louise's half-brother, Prince Frederick in 1753.

Princess Louise was considered the most beautiful and spirited of Frederick V's children, but also the most reserved. She was Christian VII's favorite sister, and he was already from childhood strongly attached to his "Louison," as he called her.

== Marriage and issue ==
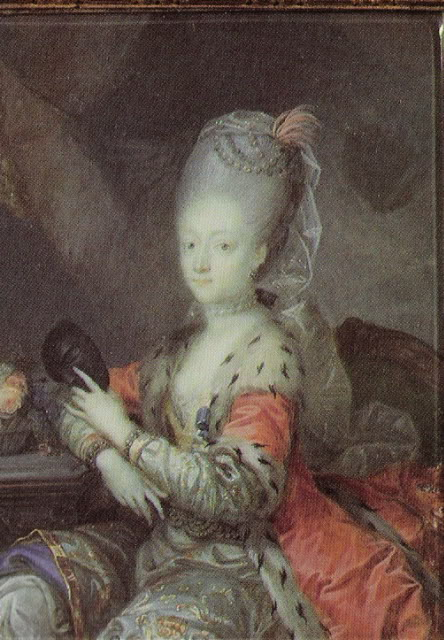
Miniature portrait of Princess Louise from 1772.

In 1756, Queen Louise's sister, Mary, who was estranged from her husband, Landgrave Frederick II of Hesse-Kassel, moved to Denmark to take care of her deceased sister's children. She brought her three sons with her, who were brought up at the Danish court with their Danish cousins. On 30 August 1766 at the Christiansborg Palace Chapel, Louise married the second eldest of them, Landgrave Charles of Hesse-Kassel. The marriage took place with her brother King Christian VII's consent, despite advice given against it, due to many accusations of debauchery by Landgrave Charles and the poor influence he had on the King. This, however, did not last, as Christian VII's warm feelings for him soon evaporated, and in the spring 1767, the couple left Copenhagen to live in Hanau.

She had six children with Charles of Hesse-Kassel:

- Marie Sophie, Princess of Hesse (20 October 1767 – 21 March 1852), married on 31 July 1790 to the future King Frederik VI of Denmark and Norway
- Wilhelm, Prince of Hesse (15 January 1769 – 14 July 1772)
- Prince Frederik of Hesse (24 May 1771 – 24 February 1845)
- Juliane, Princess of Hesse (19 January 1773 – 11 March 1860), Protestant Abbess of Itzehoe
- Prince Christian of Hesse (14 August 1776 – 14 November 1814)
- Princess Louise Caroline of Hesse-Kassel (28 September 1789 – 13 March 1867), married on 28 January 1810 to Friedrich Wilhelm, Duke of Schleswig-Holstein-Sonderburg-Glücksburg

== Later life ==
She would have her first child in Hanau, Marie Sophie, Princess of Hesse on 20 October 1767 and then her second, Wilhelm, Prince of Hesse on 20 January 1769. The family would then move to Gottorp Castle after her spouse was appointed governor of Schleswig Holstein. In 1770, King Christian VII gave his sister a parish and land in Güby, Schleswig-Holstein, which was named Louisenlund in her honour. In the summer of 1770, Louise and Charles hosted the king and queen during their tour of the Duchies on their way to the German border. During their stay, rumors circulated about the affair between the queen and Struensee because of their manner, and it was observed that the queen was anxious not to be near Struensee in the presence of Louise. When the royal couple left, Louise was reportedly disappointed that she was not asked to accompany them on their journey. She would have her third child Prince Frederik of Hesse on 24 May 1771.

After the removal and execution of Johann Friedrich Struensee on 28 April 1772 her husband found favour with the King again and with it, he was appointed commander-in-chief of the Norwegian army. in September 1772. It was said that Charles planned to raise support in Norway for a coup to take the regency power over the king from prince Frederick and queen dowager Juliana. Louise did not initially accompany him there, but when he returned to Denmark in April 1773, she returned with him to Norway in June. They were very well received in Christiania, and upon their arrival in Trondhjem, one aristocrat, Nordahl Brun, welcomed them as the "heavenly couple", and greeted Louise with a poem. In the Landgrave's own words, he became so popular that the Norwegians would gladly have him as King. This was clearly an illusion, and the people of Christiania soon found the cost of constantly entertaining the couple, a huge burden on town expenses. Expensive demands, such as new golden chairs to sit in during church service, and a triumphal arch for the official entry of Louise in to Christiania where examples of the standard the royal couple demanded for their standard during their stay and created antipathy among the population. On 4 September, Louise and Charles hosted a ball and a court reception in honor of the birthday of queen Juliana Maria and departed on 8 September 1773.

With her husband's larger income, he had Hermann von Motz build Louisenlund Castle on the land in Güby as a summer residence for the couple. The Princess would have her fourth child Juliane, Princess of Hesse on 19 January 1773 before leaving Norway and moving into Louisenlund Castle in 1774. Her husband was also made Field Marshal the same year but would stay away from political circles and remain at Louisenlund till the 14th change of government in April 1784. The new change brought a close friendship with Crown Prince Frederik, who would also marry their daughter Princess, Marie Sophie. They would later become King Frederick VI of Denmark and Queen Marie Sophie of Denmark.

Princess Louise would have two more children, Prince Christian of Hesse, born 14 August 1776 and Princess Louise Caroline of Hesse-Kassel, born 28 September 1789. Her husband continued as commander-in-chief of the Norwegian army until 1814 and governor of Schleswig Holstein all her life. She died at Gottorp Castle on 12 January 1831 and was buried in Schleswig Cathedral.

== Ancestry ==
Ancestors of Princess Louise of Denmark (1750–1831)

8. Frederick IV of Denmark
4. Christian VI of Denmark
9. Louise of Mecklenburg-Güstrow
2. Frederick V of Denmark
10. Christian Henry, Margrave of Brandenburg-Kulmbach
5. Sophie Magdalene of Brandenburg-Kulmbach
11. Sophie Christiane of Wolfstein
1. Louise of Denmark
12. George I of Great Britain
6. George II of Great Britain
13. Sophia Dorothea of Celle
3. Louise of Great Britain
14. John Frederick, Margrave of Brandenburg-Ansbach
7. Caroline of Ansbach
15. Princess Eleonore Erdmuthe of Saxe-Eisenach
