= King's Garden (Odense) =

Park in Odense, Denmark

Coordinates: 55°24′0″N 10°23′7″E

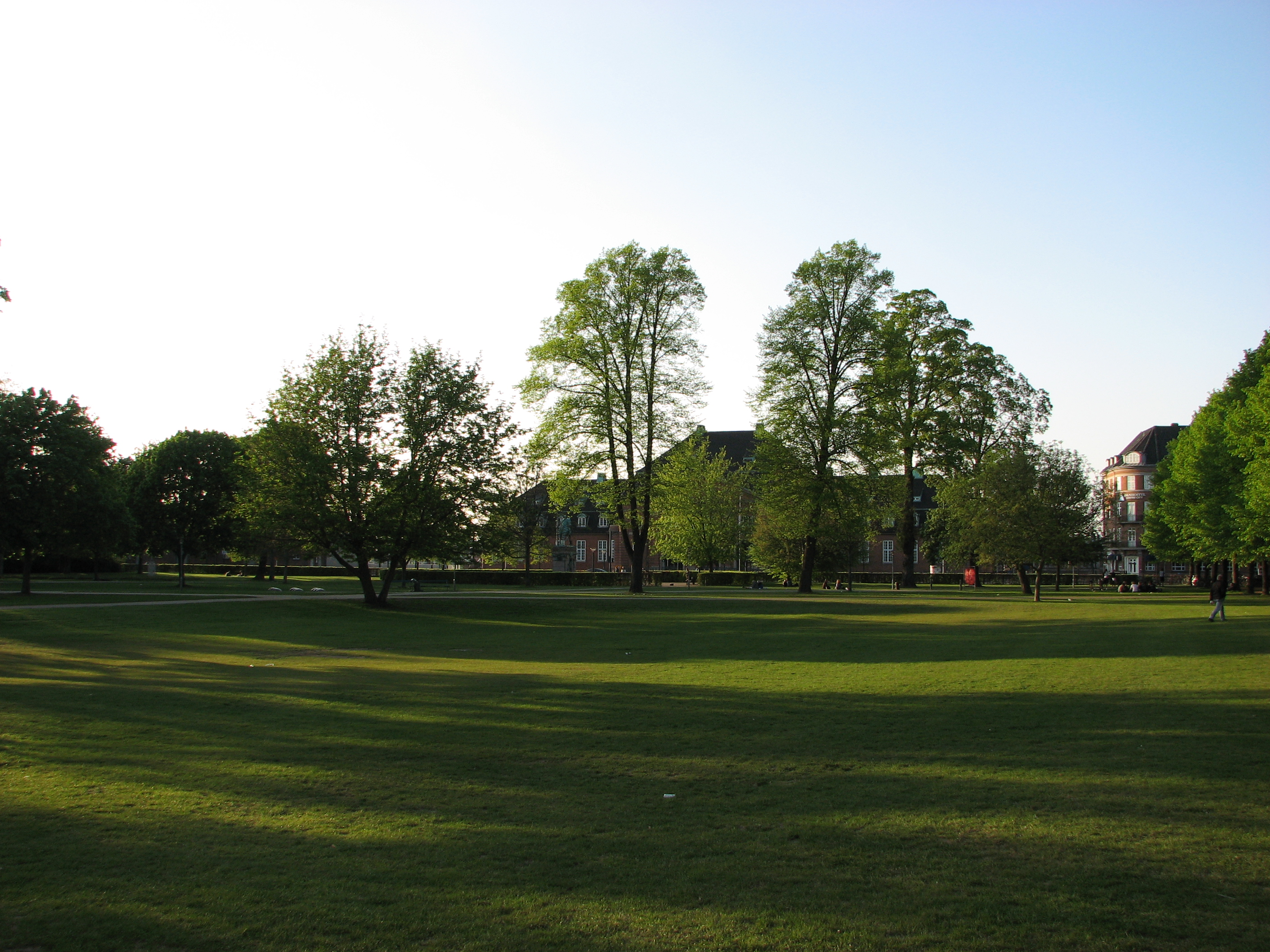
The King's Garden from the north and the old railway station building

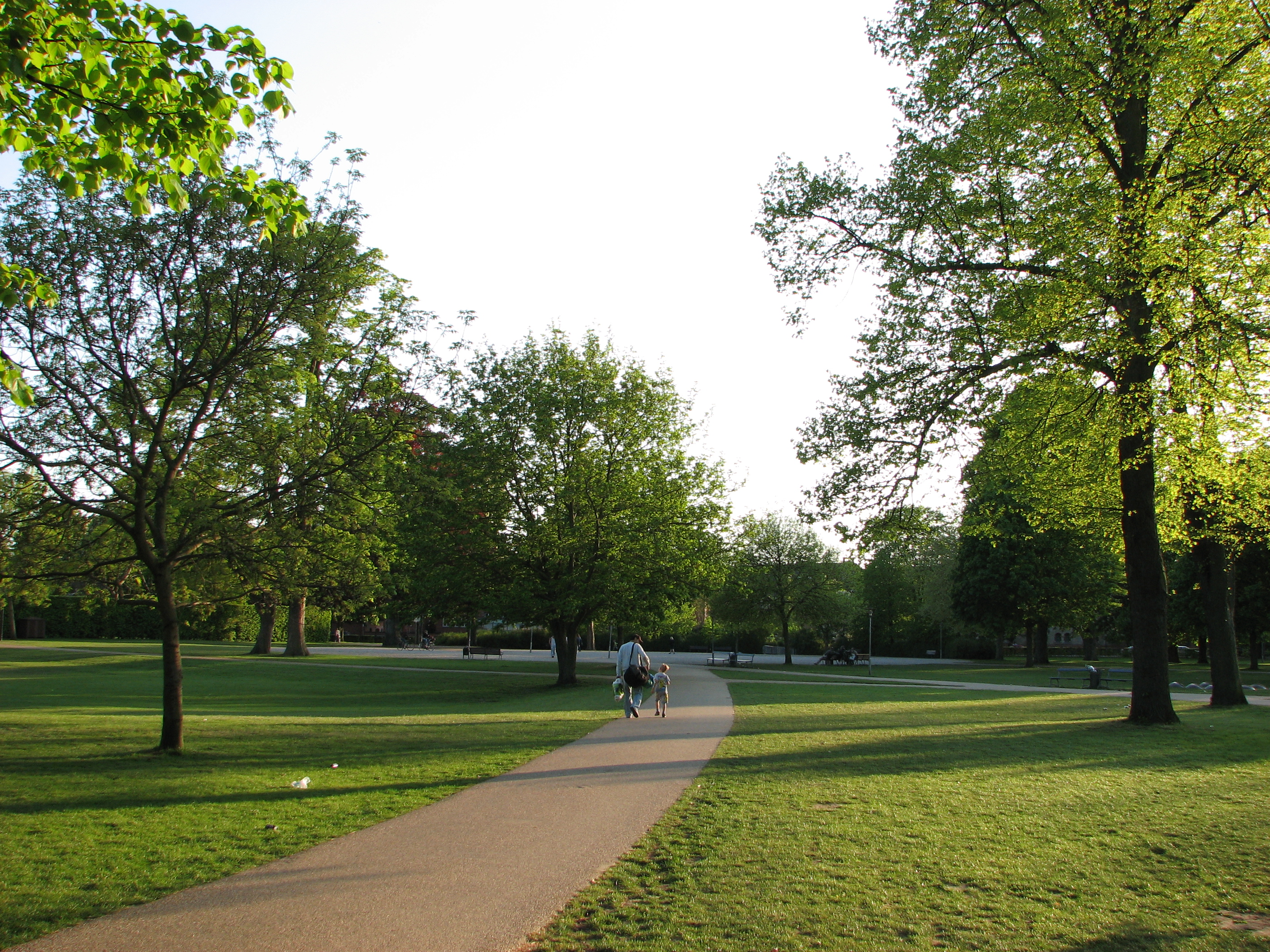
King's Gardens towards the south and center

King's Garden (Danish, Kongens Have) is a large, formal palace park in central Odense, Denmark. Located directly across from the Odense station, it is bounded by Railroad Street to the west and Eastern Stationsvej to the north. It stands in front of Odense Palace.

The original Baroque garden was constructed around 1720 by Johan Cornelius Krieger to share French design with its central axis and symmetrical lines. About 100 years later, it was changed into an English-style garden with curved lines. Measuring approximately 2 acres (0.81 ha) in size, the park contains some protected trees that are over 100 years old, including copper beech, tulip and magnolia. There are two statues, including one of Hans Christian Andersen, erected by the school children of Denmark.
