= Saint Hans Church =

Coordinates: 55°23′57″N 10°23′15″E

- Sankt Hans Kirke
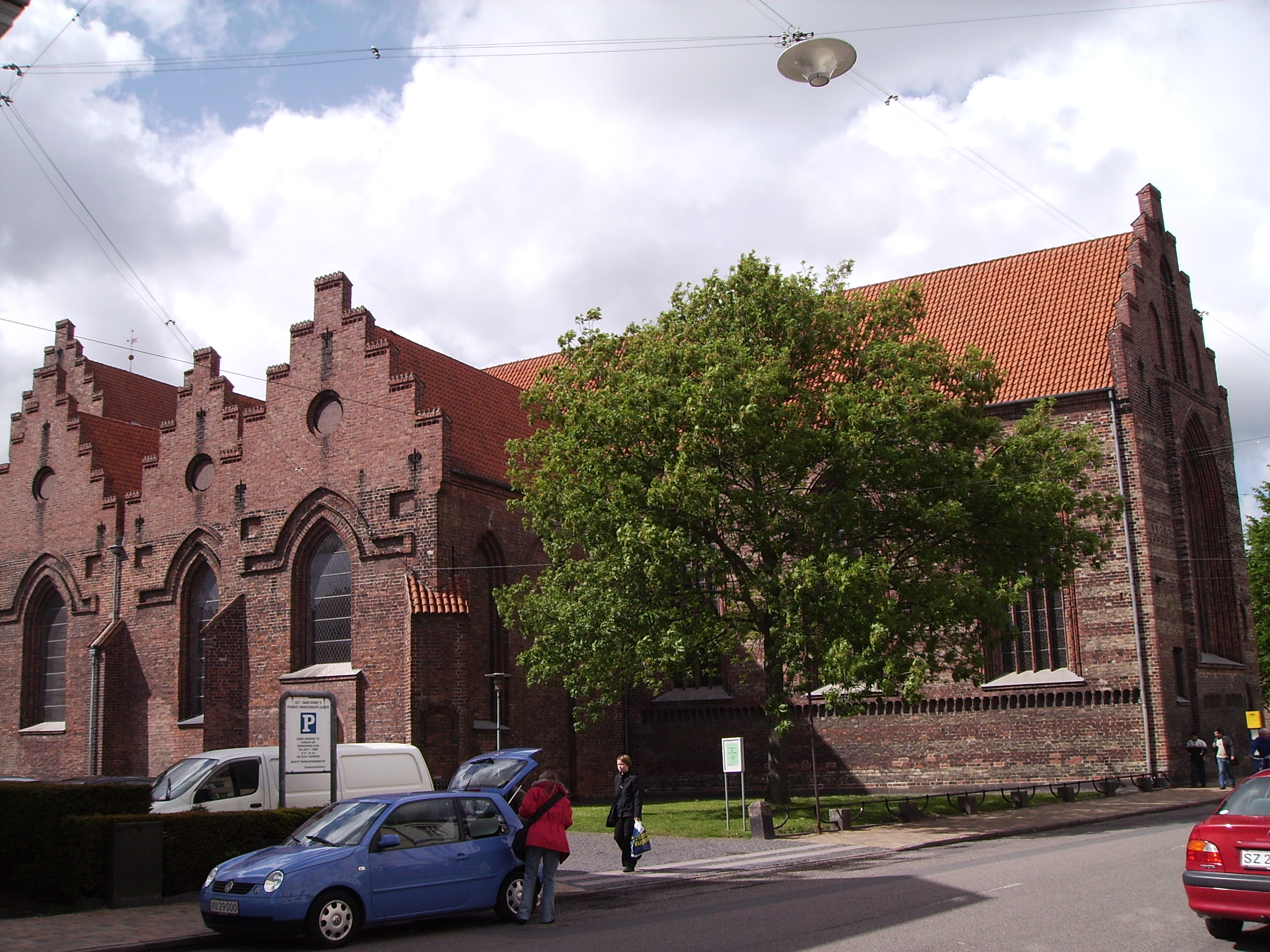
- Saint Hans Church
- Location: Odense, Denmark
- Denomination: Church of Denmark
- Website: https://sankthanskirke.dk/

Architecture
- Completed: c. 1100

Administration
- Diocese: Diocese of Funen
- Parish: Sankt Hans Sogn

Saint Hans Church (Danish: Sankt Hans Kirke) is a church in Odense, Denmark.

== History ==
First mentioned in 1295, it was built by the Knights Hospitaller, also known as the Order of Saint John.

Not much of the original building remains as it was rebuilt in 1636 and subsequently restored on two occasions. Built of red brick with horizontal decorations on the chancel wall, it has large Gothic windows. The date of 1496 on one of the bells in the step-ribbed tower may well be the year the church was completed. The tower is adjacent to Odense Palace which was originally built as a monastery.

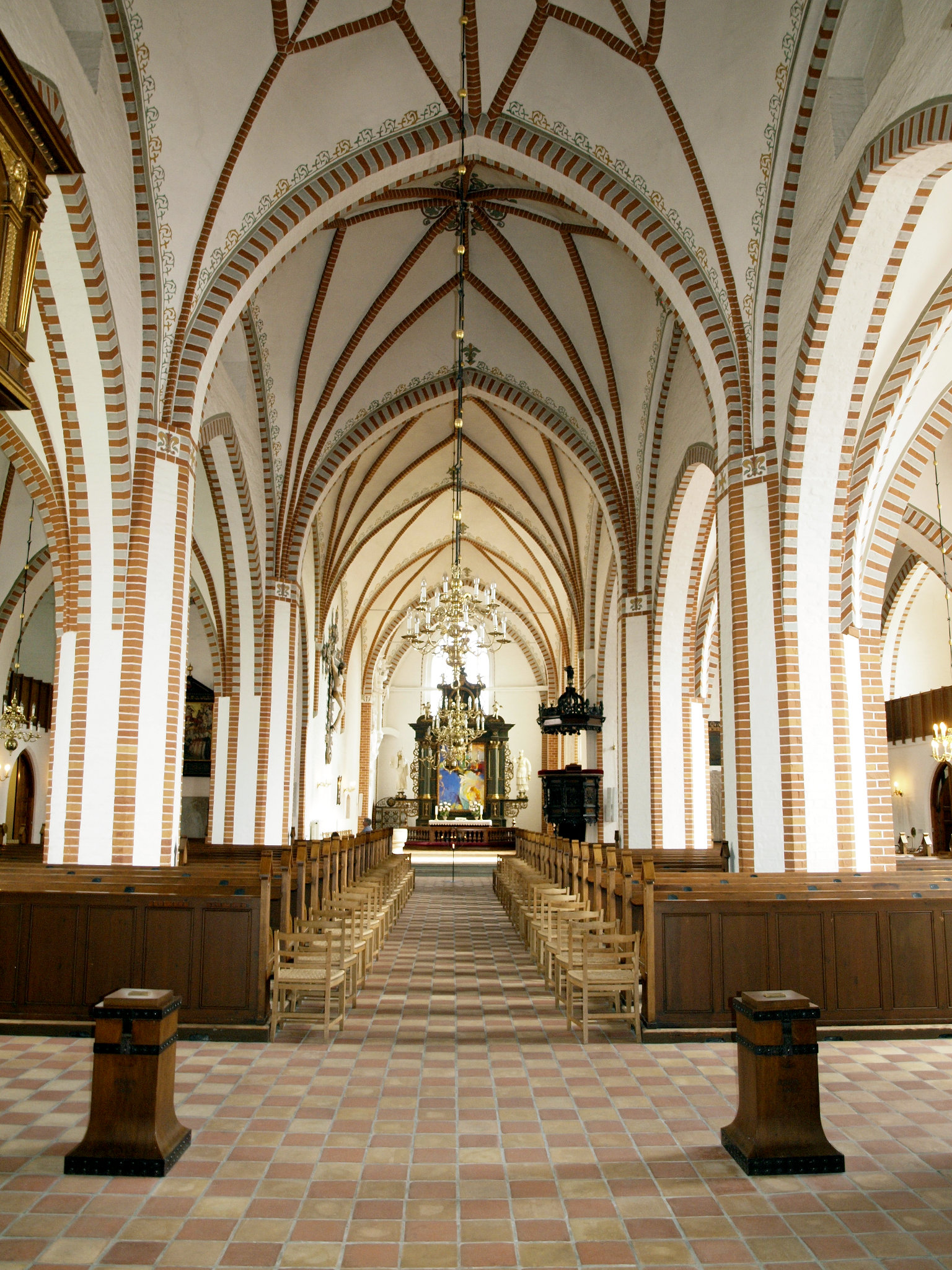
Interior of the church

The church has a three manual Marcussen organ used by Kevin Bowyer to record the complete organ works of Bach for Nimbus Records.

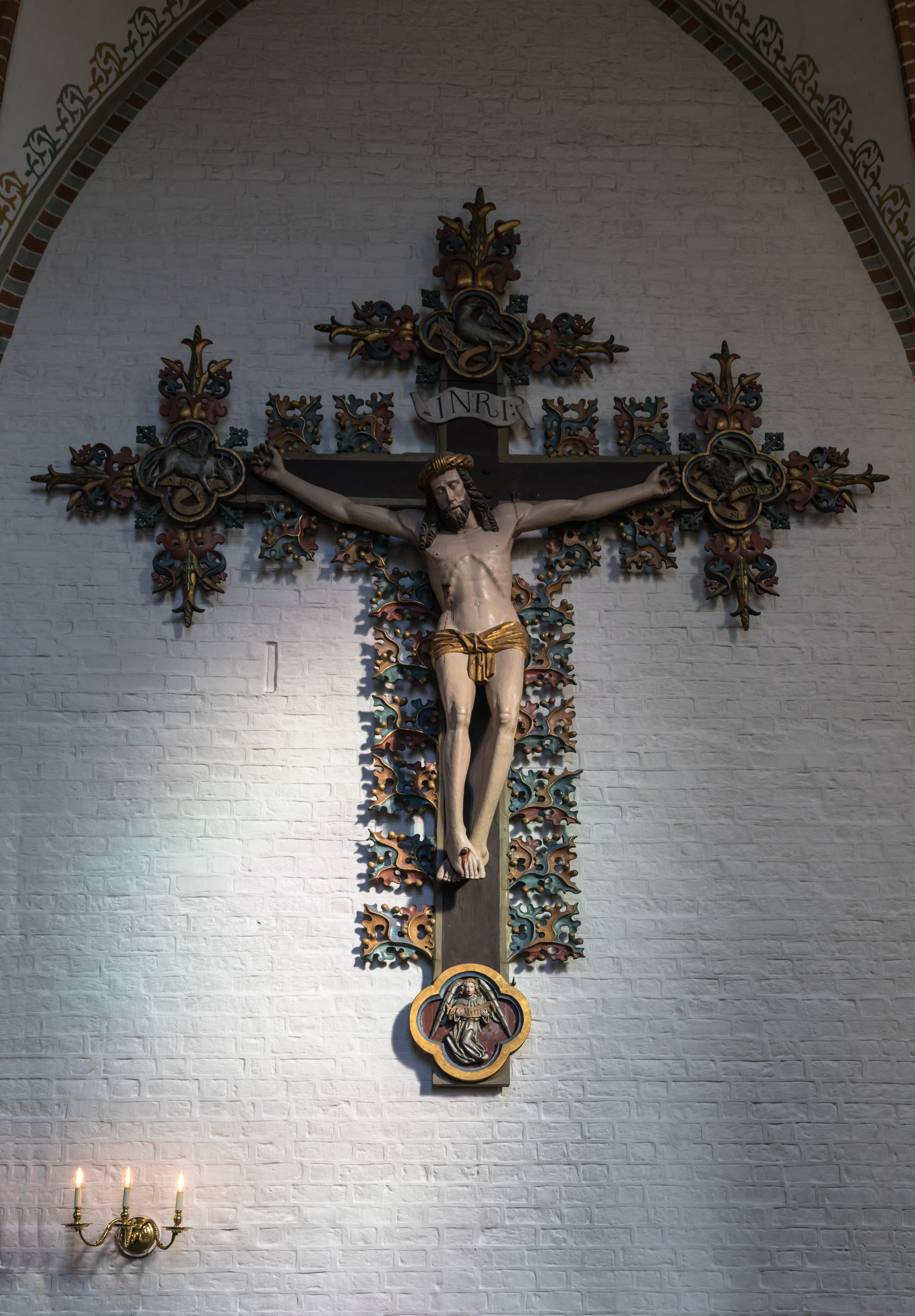
Large Gothic crucifix in the church
