= Marie of Hesse-Kassel =

Queen of Denmark (1808–39) and Norway (1808–14)

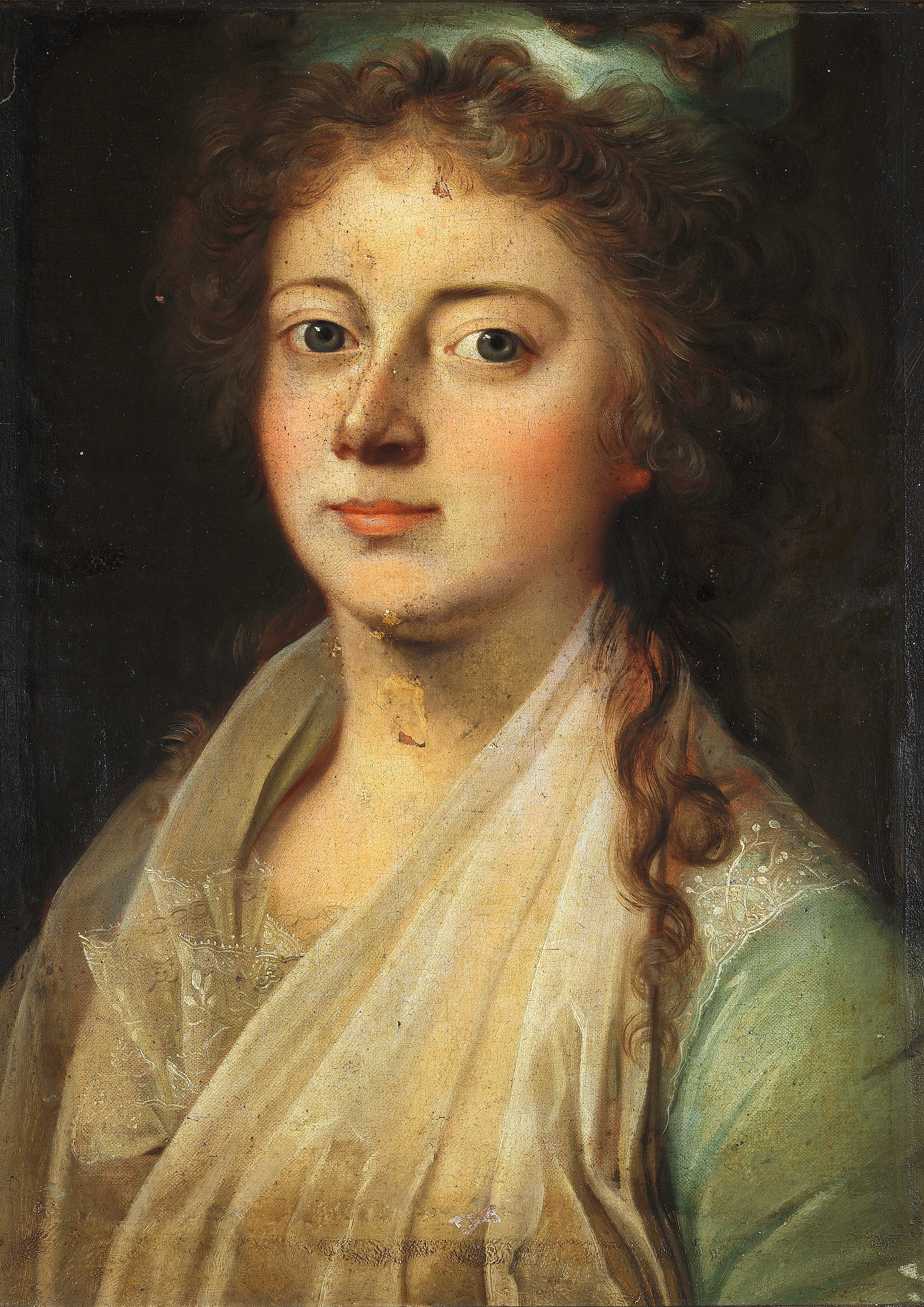
- Portrait by Jens Juel, c. 1790s

Queen consort of Denmark
- Tenure: 13 March 1808 – 3 December 1839
- Coronation: 31 July 1815; Frederiksborg Palace Chapel

Queen consort of Norway
- Tenure: 13 March 1808 – 14 January 1814
- Born: 28 October 1767; Hanau
- Died: 22 March 1852 (aged 84); Frederiksberg Palace
- Burial: Roskilde Cathedral
- Spouse: Frederick VI of Denmark (m. 1790; died 1839)
- Issue among others...: Caroline, Hereditary Princess of Denmark; Vilhelmine, Duchess of Schleswig-Holstein-Sonderburg-Glücksburg
- House: Hesse-Kassel
- Father: Landgrave Charles of Hesse-Kassel
- Mother: Princess Louise of Denmark

Marie Sophie Frederikke of Hesse-Kassel (28 October 1767 – 21/22 March 1852) was Queen of Denmark and Norway by marriage to Frederick VI. She served as regent of Denmark during the absence of her spouse in 1814–1815.

== Biography ==
=== Early life ===
Marie was the eldest child of Prince Charles of Hesse-Kassel and Princess Louise of Denmark. Her father was the second son of the ruler of Hesse-Kassel, and as such, had no principality of his own. Thus he acted in such positions as were offered to cadet members of royal houses by their reigning relatives. Denmark-Norway offered more and better positions than the small Hesse-Kassel. Her mother was the third and youngest daughter of King Frederick V of Denmark-Norway and his consort, Louise of Great Britain. As such, she was the niece of King Christian VII and the Prince Regent Frederick, as well as their first cousin.

She was born in Hanau, but was raised in Slesvig in Denmark-Norway from 1769, when her father was appointed governor of the Danish duchies. Marie spent her early life in Gottorp Castle and at her mother's Danish country estate Louisenlund. Little is known of Marie's childhood, but the life of the little German court at Louisenlund, headed by Fraulein von Berlichingen, are described by her mother's lady-in-waiting Julie Stolberg as very simple, without great ceremony, and that the royal couple allowed their children to be raised very naturally. She was given a German education, and German was her first language. She was affected by her father's interest in mysticism, and was also fascinated by dreams. Marie was later to describe her childhood as happy, and often expressed that she missed the idyll of her childhood home and longed to visit it.

=== Crown Princess ===
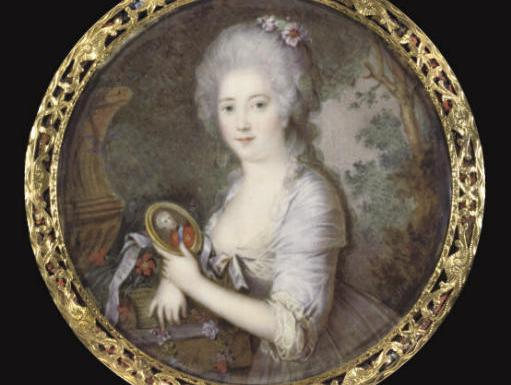
Marie Sophie supposedly holding a portrait of her fiancé. Miniature portrait by Cornelius Høyer.

After crown prince Frederick was declared of legal majority and resumed the regency in 1784, the Danish royal court started to make inquiries to arrange a marriage for him. Marie was among the candidates for the marriage, and described as literary interested, and reported to have composed poetry and have made a declamation of the Messiah. However, she was not the preferred candidate within the royal court, and it was pointed out both that Frederick did not share Marie's literary interests, and that she was further more given a much too free and unrestricted childhood. The influential half–sister of Frederick, Princess Louise Auguste of Denmark, reportedly feared that she would be replaced in her brother's affections, and her husband, the Duke of Augustenburg, likewise feared to have his influence diminished, and they were supported by a party at court which was opposed to Marie's father Prince Charles, who was widely unpopular. Frederick arranged his marriage against the will of both his court, council and also of his sister and brother-in-law, but he had the support of his future father-in-law, who attempted to gain influence in Danish state affairs through it.

Crown Prince Regent Frederick strongly disliked being affected in his choice by the court, and was eager to show himself independent to it. Marie was selected by her cousin as his spouse mainly as a way for him to demonstrate his independence from his court, who wanted a more political dynastic match. In the summer of 1787, Frederick made a visit to Prince Charles and his aunt Princess Louise at Gottorp Castle and met Marie as well. On 31 July 1790 in Gottorp, she married her first cousin Frederick, then crown prince and regent of Denmark-Norway.

The marriage was greeted with great enthusiasm by the public, as she was regarded as completely Danish and not a foreigner, and she was referred to as a daughter of the nation. Her official entrance into Copenhagen on 14 September 1790 was described as a triumph. The occasion was used by writers and the press to celebrate not only Marie, but also Frederick's enlightened rule and popularity, for which his marriage was taken as another proof because of Marie's status as a Dane. A known poem, Heibergs Indtogsvise, praised the marriage because "Frederick had chosen his bride among the daughters of the nation".

Crown Princess Marie was described as shy and reserved, particularly as she did not master the Danish language, and her shyness was interpreted as haughtiness, while her sister-in-law Louise Augusta continued to be the center of the royal court and the most popular female member of the royal family. This was illustrated by an incident at the Royal Danish Theatre in 1792, when Republican sentiments grew in Copenhagen during the victories of the revolutionary French army under Dumouriez, the crown princess, who entered her box with a deeper nod as greeting to the public than usual, was met by the comment "Look at that, if Dumoriez has not taught the princess to be civil!", while her sister-in-law was greeted by the public with the shouts "Welcome, Darling Augusta!" Within the circles of the royal court and nobility, Marie was viewed as a threat to the popular Louise Augusta, and was compared unfavorably with her. She was criticized at court for being too proud, of driving a wedge between the crown prince at the Augustenburg party, and of not being accommodating enough toward her sister-in-law. Marie, however, is known to have been eager to come to terms with her sister-in-law, and at least on one known occasion to have asked her to forgive her if she had caused her any offence. Her father introduced her and the crown prince to circles invested in German religious mysticism, and the princely couple, Prince Charles, Andreas Peter Bernstorff and Augusta Bernstorff, are known to have invited Lavater to Denmark in 1793. Lavater did visit them in the summer of 1793, and has described Marie as a lovable young child.

Crown Princess Marie was put under immense pressure to produce a male heir to the throne, as the main line of the royal family was in danger of being extinguished. She gave birth to son who died in 1791, and lost several children in the following years, with only two daughters alive, who were not considered suitable heirs to the throne because of their gender. She accepted the death of her children with the words "God's will be done" and expressed herself happy with the children who did live, and her humble and brave attitude during her childbirths was admired and contributed to defeat the hostility at court voiced by the Reventlow-Bernstorff-Schimmelmann-Party, and replaced it with admiration.

As for the relationship with Frederick, Marie described herself privately to the wife of Christian Ditlev Frederik Reventlow as "the happiest of wives". During the fire of Christiansborg Palace in 1794, Andreas Peter Bernstorff described Marie in a letter:

"She is, in the truest sense of the word, a Wife and Mother and she does not aspire to be more than that. When I saw her in a terrifying moment, when she did not know, whether anything of her possessions had been saved, she met me with her child, who had not yet been inoculated against the small pocks, on her arm. She said then: 'As of me, I have my treasure', while patting the head of the little princess."

Marie eventually became popular within the small circle of people who came to know her, but her reserved nature did not make her popular among the wider court or public and she was disliked for not being seen very often in public by the side of the crown prince when she might have been expected to be, as she abhorred representational duties.

In 1805, the crown prince couple moved to Kiel to be close to the border during because of the threatening proximity of Napoleon in Germany, and Marie was to remain there until 1809. She enjoyed the years in Kiel very much: court life and representation was reduced, she was able to visit her parents in Gottorp and Louisenlund, and she referred to the years in Kiel as a paradise. In 1808, the burghers of Kiel built a pavilion and presented it to Marie as a gift.

=== Queen ===
In 1808, Frederick became king, and Marie queen. On 31 October 1809, she made her second official entry to Copenhagen, this time as queen, an occasion which has been described as a moment when her personal popularity among the public was demonstrated.

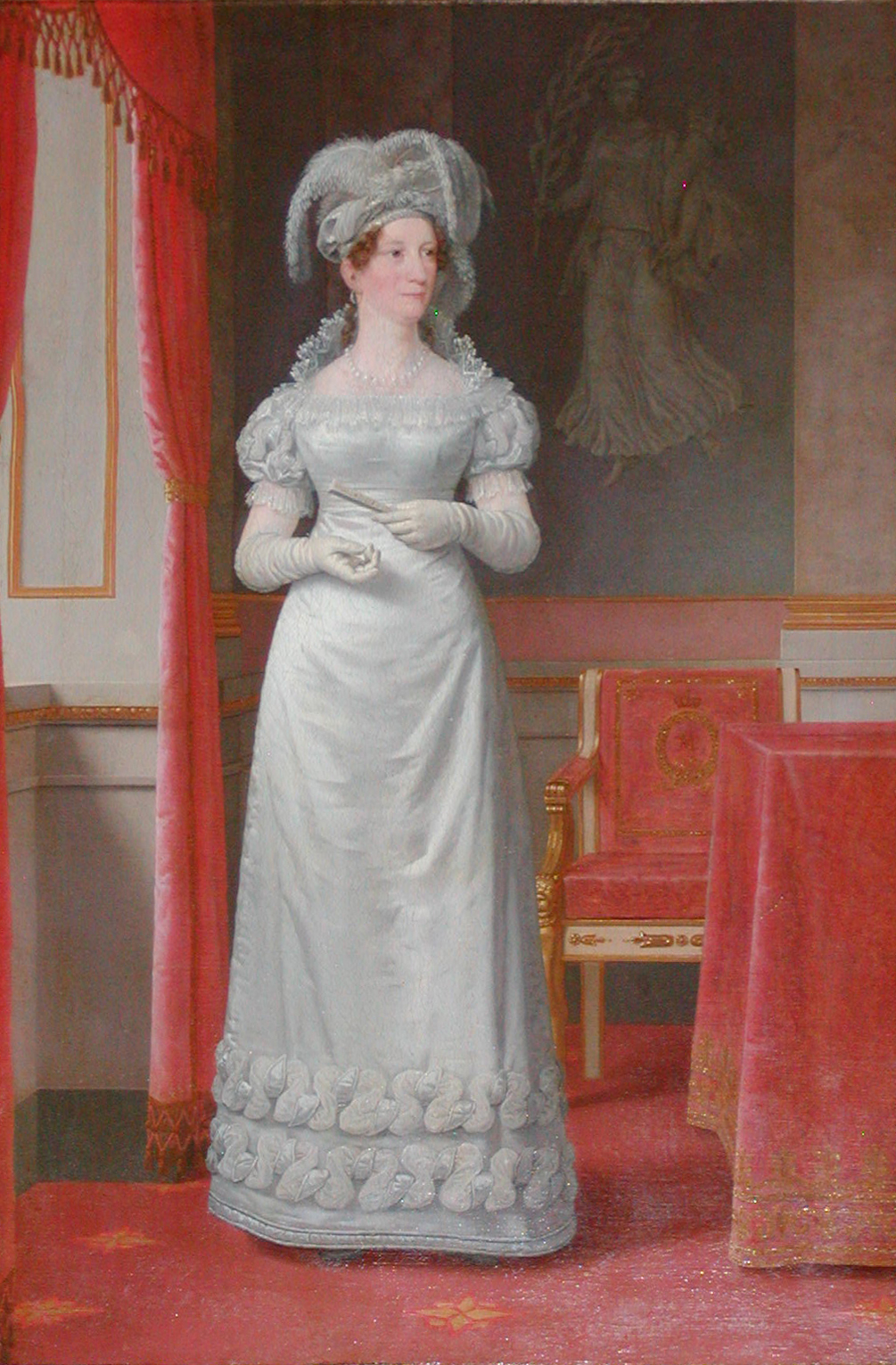
Portrait of Queen Marie, by Christoffer Wilhelm Eckersberg (early 1820s)

During her husband's last years as crown prince, he often spent long periods in Copenhagen while she remained in Kiel, and these years created a distance between them. When her last childbirth in 1808 resulted in an injury which prevented further intercourse, she was forced to accept her spouse's adultery with Frederikke Dannemand. The relationship between Marie and Frederick VI after this was described as a respectful friendship, and the political turmoil of the time reportedly created a trusting relationship between them. The writer Ingemann wrote of her: "She wore the crown with dignity and with a bleeding heart."

Marie was interested in politics, genealogy and history. She had started to take an interest in politics during her years in Kiel. She was more often noted to speak of politics with people to acquire knowledge, was courted by the Reventlow-Stolberg Party, and was opposed to Napoleon and the alliance with France. She inspired Frederick VI to take the later Christian IX of Denmark into his family in 1825, and he arrived in Denmark in 1832.

Marie also took an interest in history and literature. She became more acquainted with the native Danes, finally learned the Danish language more fluently, took an interest in Danish literature and was known to read aloud the works of Oehlenschlager and Ingemann. Her lady-in-waiting Amalie Münster, who was a literary person, attracted many artists to the circle of the queen.

As queen she is described as serene, peaceful and dignified. Elise Bernstorff, married to minister Christian August Bernstorff described Marie in 1810:

"We were very happy about the kindness of our gracious queen, her excellent, pure French, her in truth princely distance, her dignified and still graceful personality and her friendliness, which was always the same. She wished to win people over, and you were grateful that she wished it so, when princesses from later era in their wish to be truthful when to far and thus seemed proud. It was her longing to be loved by her people, by all classes of her people, and she became truly lovable in this quest. She had been a beauty in her youth, and that youth lasted long, for in 1810 she was still youthful in her appearance, and she was born in 1767."

She was nevertheless known to be strict in regards to etiquette and protocol. Among her closest friends were the courtier Rantzau Breitenburg, who commented about their friendship, that she viewed him as her confessor. Rantzau Breitenburg described the queen as terrified of making the king or the public displeased with her, and therefore very anxious and hesitant to take initiatives.

Queen Marie was regent of Denmark from 5 September 1814 to 1 June 1815, during the absence of her spouse in the Vienna Congress in Austria. Marie took her office as regent with ambition, and she was regarded to have performed her duties well during her regency. When she took her seat on her first day in the regency, she read aloud her own Exposé de la situation politique du Danemarc as her opening speech, a summary of the Danish foreign policy since 1807, which had placed Denmark-Norway, as an ally of Napoleon, in the difficult situation it was in 1814, and an analysis of the political condition of Denmark.

By doing so she voiced concerns widely felt in Denmark at the time, where there was great discontent with the king's policy during the Napoleonic Wars, and she was therefore greeted with great enthusiasm during her regency. In October 1814, a foreign spectator noted, "This Princess was greeted at the theater yesterday with great cheers", and the following year, "The queen was greeted with unanimous cheers at the theatre. How times changes! There was a time when one referred to her as 'German Maria', but now its different". She excused Frederick VI in regard to the Norwegian question, and strongly criticized the behavior of King Christian Frederik of Norway, though she did send him a ship to evacuate him from Norway and bring him back to Denmark.

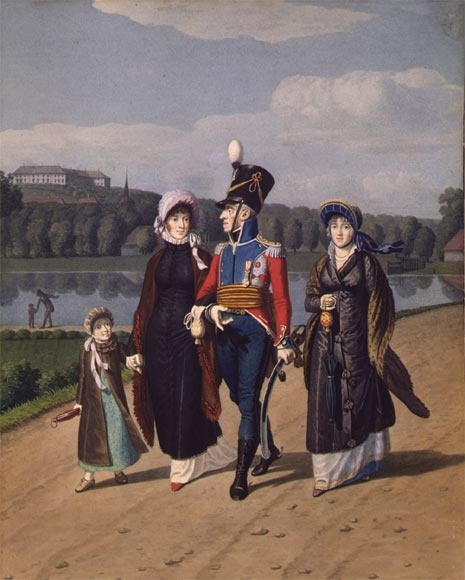
Queen Marie and King Frederick VI strolling with their daughters in the gardens of Frederiksberg Palace in the 1810's.

From the end of her regency in 1815 until the death of Frederick VI in 1839, her life as queen was a quiet one and she participated in social life only when necessary to fulfill her representational duties. One of the reasons for her reclusive lifestyle was reportedly the injury from her last childbirth, which evidently made it necessary for her to move about more carefully. In 1822–24, Marie anonymously published the genealogy Supplement-Tafeln zu Joh. Hubners genealogischen Tabellen, a genealogy with historical notes. Reportedly, she kept a diary since her wedding and wrote her memoirs with support of it, but as she had ordered it burnt in her will, it is no longer kept. From 1815, she protected the women's charity organisation Det Kvindelige Velgørende Selskab.

During the reign of Frederick, particularly after the end of the Napoleonic wars, the royal family became a popular symbol of family life, as the king appeared to the public in the capital walking in the park with his wife and daughters, and sailing with them along the canal.

=== Queen Dowager ===
Marie was widowed in 1839. As a widow, she retired from public life to a peaceful existence divided by Frederiksborg and Amalienborg, respected as a symbol of the former dynasty line.

Reportedly, she was a stranger to politics during her later life, but the strife between the branches of the family during the succession crisis and the rebellion in Holstein pained her. Marie could not understand the split caused by the emerging nationalism, nor the political conflicts caused by the demands of an emerging democracy, and was confused about the new ideas of the time. Anders Sandøe Ørsted wrote:

"No one mourned more deeply about the split, which during her last years emerged in the parts of the nation which was stilled united, she could not even grasp the possibility of it."

Bishop Martensen noted her sorrow over the war with Schleswig-Holstein and that she did not understand the new ideas of a nation, and that she once said:

" When one is a person of the nobility, is it not pointless, if one is a Dane or German?"

Marie died at Amalienborg on 21 March 1852.

== Children ==
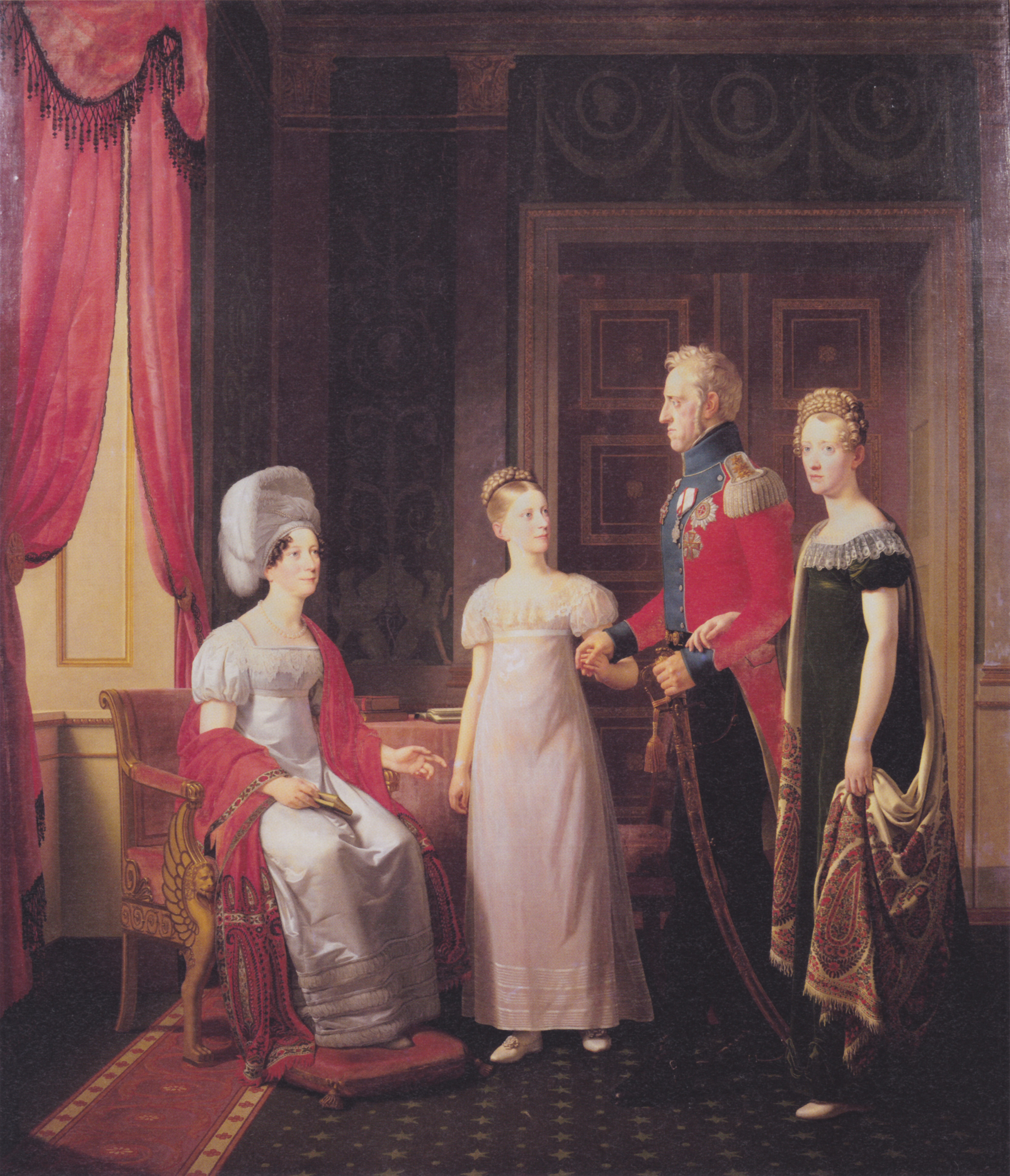
Frederik VI and Queen Marie with Princesses Caroline and Vilhelmine. Painted by C.W. Eckersberg, 1821.

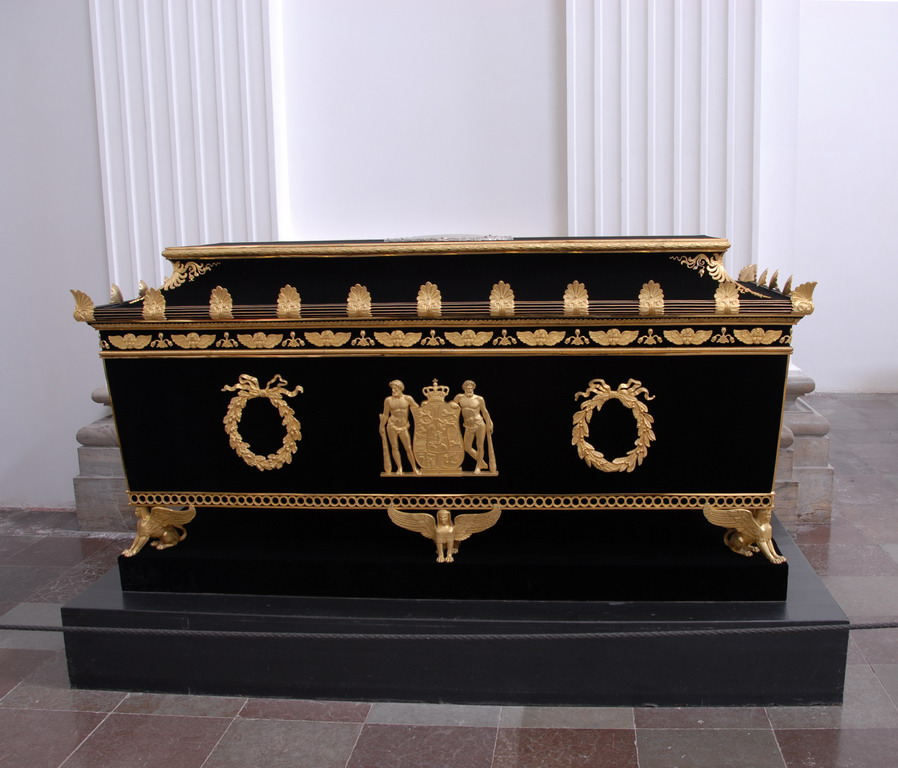
Her sarcophagus in Roskilde Cathedral

Marie and Frederick VI had eight children. None of Frederick VI's sons survived infancy, however, and when he died in 1839, he was succeeded by his cousin, Christian VIII of Denmark. The only surviving children of King Frederick VI and Queen Marie were their two daughters:

- Christian (Copenhagen, 22 September 1791 – Copenhagen, 23 September 1791)
- Marie Louise (Copenhagen, 19 November 1792 – Frederiksborg, 12 October 1793)
- Caroline (Copenhagen, 28 October 1793 – Copenhagen, 31 March 1881), married to her father's first cousin Frederick Ferdinand of Denmark, (d. 1863) some months before his nephew Frederik VII of Denmark, Hereditary Prince of Denmark, son of Christian VIII of Denmark. Childless.
- Louise (Copenhagen, 21 August 1795 – Copenhagen, 7 December 1795)
- Christian (Copenhagen, 1 September 1797 – Copenhagen, 5 September 1797)
- Juliana Louise (Copenhagen, 12 February 1802 – Copenhagen, 23 February 1802)
- Frederikke Marie (Copenhagen, 3 June 1805 – Copenhagen, 14 July 1805)
- Vilhelmine Marie (Kiel, 18 January 1808 – Glücksburg, 30 May 1891), firstly married to her second cousin Prince Frederik of Denmark, the future Frederick VII of Denmark, but they divorced, and she married secondly her first cousin Karl, Duke of Schleswig-Holstein-Sonderburg-Glücksburg, who was eldest brother of the future Christian IX of Denmark. Both her marriages were childless.

Queen Marie lamented her lack of sons and grandchildren. When her youngest sister, Duchess Louise Caroline of Lyksborg, became a widow when most of her large brood of children were as yet very young, Queen Marie accepted some of the younger ones into her tutelage in the royal household. They were much younger than the queen's two surviving daughters. One such foster child of hers was the future Christian IX of Denmark, born in 1818.

Christian of Lyksborg and his wife Louise of Hesse-Kassel named their second daughter, Marie Sophie Frederikke Dagmar of Lyksborg (born 1847), in the queen's honor as her namesake. After her death in 1852, that girl became Tsarina Maria Fedorovna of Russia, preserving there the queen's first name (Maria/Marie).

She became the 292nd Dame of the Royal Order of Queen Maria Luisa on 17 April 1834.

== Ancestry ==
Ancestors of Marie of Hesse-Kassel

8. William VIII, Landgrave of Hesse-Kassel
4. Frederick II, Landgrave of Hesse-Kassel
9. Princess Dorothea Wilhelmine of Saxe-Zeitz
2. Prince Charles of Hesse-Kassel
10. George II of Great Britain
5. Princess Mary of Great Britain
11. Princess Caroline of Brandenburg-Ansbach
1. Marie Sophie of Hesse-Kassel
12. Christian VI of Denmark
6. Frederick V of Denmark
13. Princess Sophia Magdalene of Brandenburg-Kulmbach
3. Princess Louise of Denmark
14. George II of Great Britain (= 10)
7. Princess Louise of Great Britain
15. Princess Caroline of Brandenburg-Ansbach (= 11)

Marie of Hesse-Kassel House of Hesse-Kassel Cadet branch of the House of Hesse Born: 28 October 1767 Died: 22 March 1852
Royal titles
Vacant Title last held by Caroline Matilda of Great Britain	Queen consort of Norway; 1808–1814	Vacant Title next held by Hedvig Elisabeth Charlotte of Holstein-Gottorp
Vacant Title last held by Caroline Matilda of Great Britain	Queen consort of Denmark; 1808–1839	Succeeded by Caroline Amalie of Augustenburg
