= Karlsburg, Winnemark =

Village in Schleswig-Holstein

Coordinates: 54°37′06″N 9°57′10″E

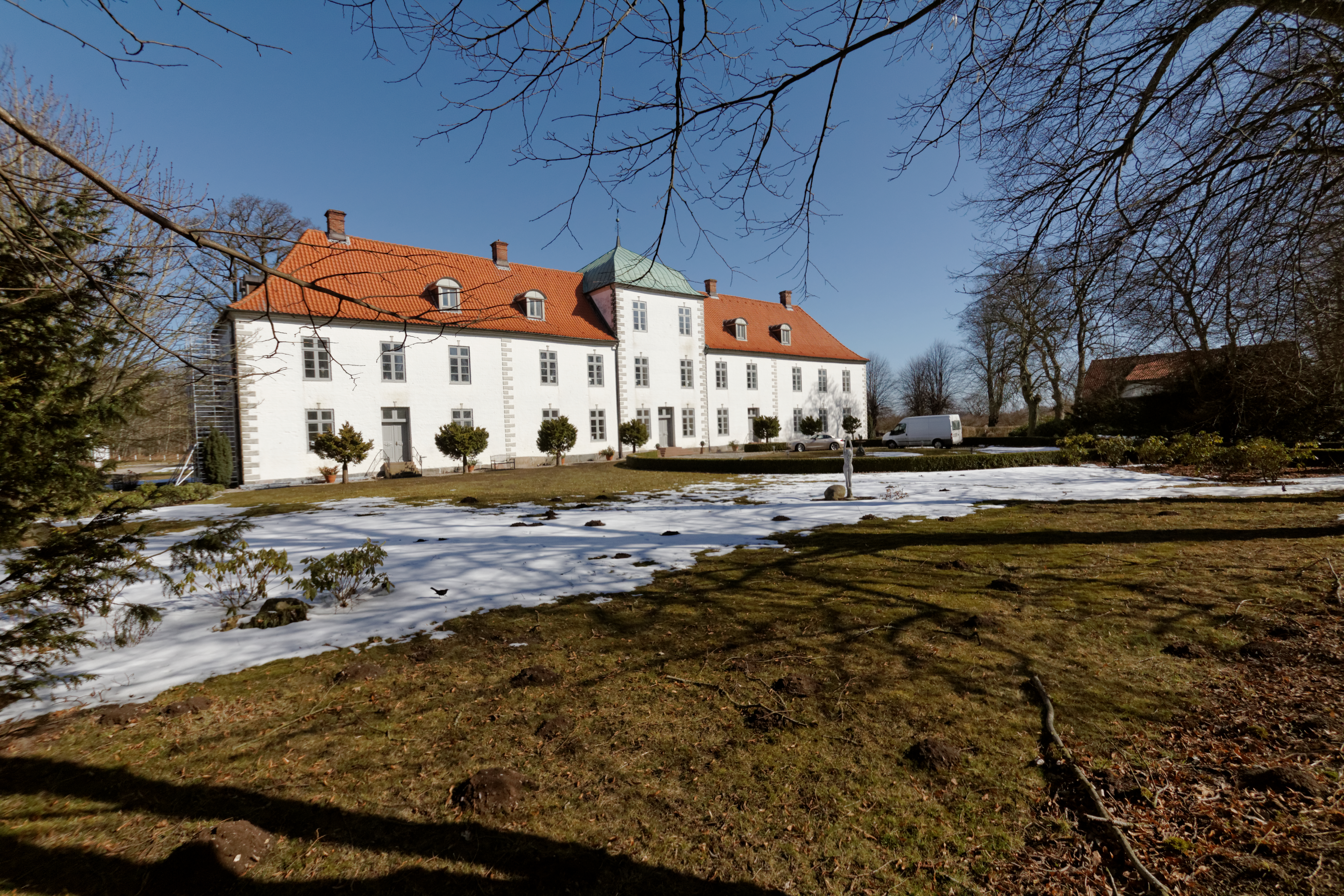

Karlsburg or Carlsburg, formerly known by the Danish name Gereby, is a village in the municipality of Winnemark in Schleswig-Holstein.
