= Hans Christian Andersen Museum =

Museum in Odense, Denmark

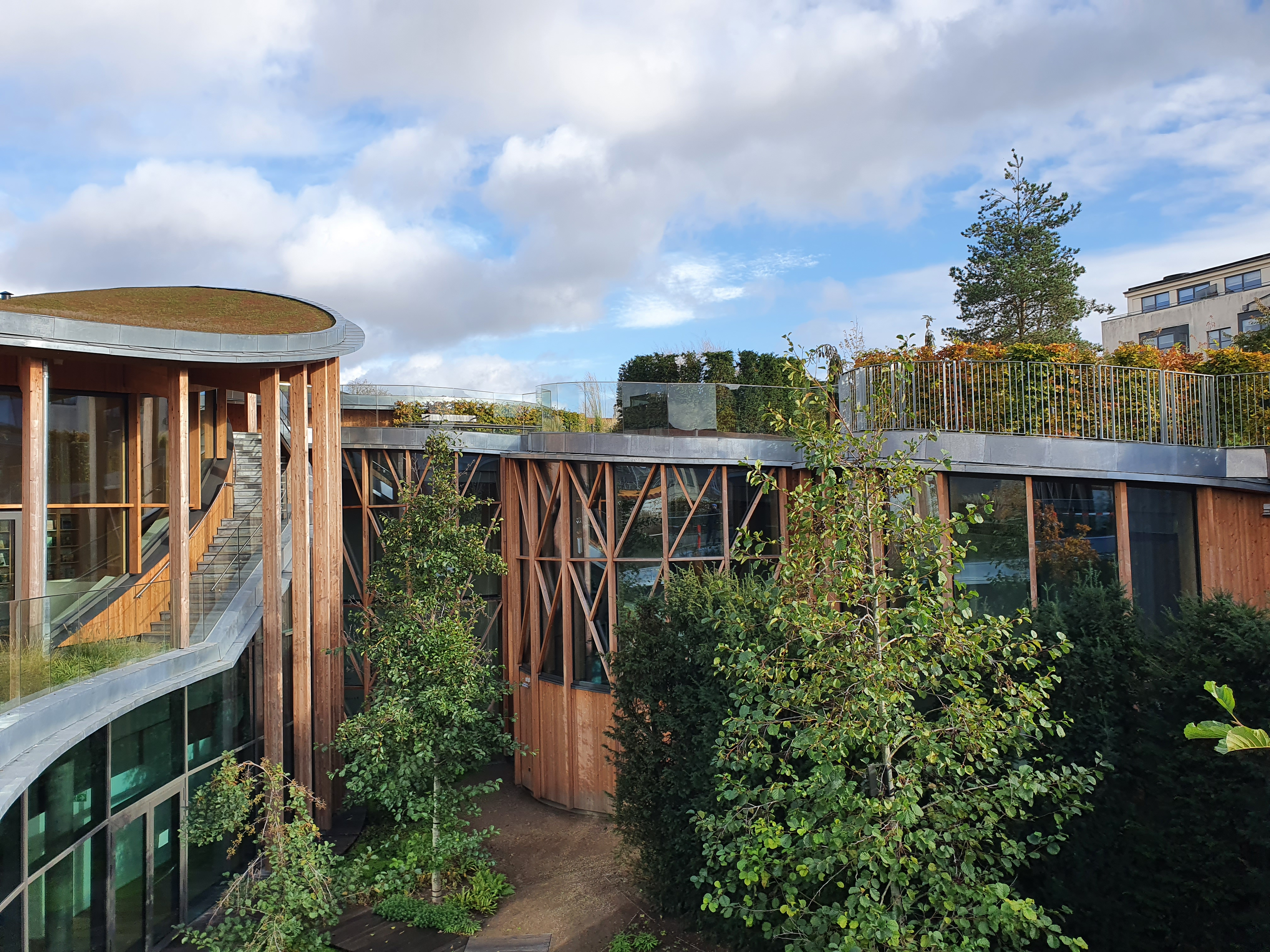
- Main museum building, October 2022
- Location: H.C. Andersen Haven 1 (Museum); Munkemøllestræde 3–5 (Childhood home); 5000 Odense, Denmark
- Coordinates: 55.3985°N 10.3907°E
- Type: History and life of Hans Christian Andersen
- Owner: Museum Odense
- Website: H. C. Andersen Museum

The Hans Christian Andersen Museum, or H.C. Andersens Odense, is a set of museums/buildings dedicated to the famous author Hans Christian Andersen in Odense, Denmark, some of which, at various times in history, have functioned as the main Odense-based museum on the author. It consists of the H.C. Andersens Hus (the main museum which incorporates Andersen's birthplace), Ville Vau (a creative play space for children), the Hans Christian Andersen Garden, and the separately located H.C. Andersen's Childhood Home.

They are administered and managed by Museum Odense.

== H.C. Andersen's Birthplace ==
The birthplace (Danish: H.C. Andersens Fødehjem) is located in the building which is thought his birthplace (not conclusively confirmed), a small yellow house on the corner of 45 Hans Jensens Stræde and Bangs Boder street in the old town. In 1908, the house was reopened as the H.C. Andersen Museum. It documents his life from his childhood years as the son of a shoemaker to his schooling, career as an author, and later life, with artifacts providing an insight into his acquaintances and adventures.

== H.C. Andersen's Childhood Home ==
Andersen's childhood home (Danish: H.C. Andersens Barndomshjem) is at 3-5 Munkemøllestræde, not far from the cathedral. He lived in the little half-timbered house from the age of two until he was 14. Opened as a museum in 1930, the house contains an exhibition of the cobbling tools used by his father and other items based on Andersen's own descriptions.

== H.C. Andersen Museum ==
In 2016, it was announced that Japanese architect, Kengo Kuma, and museum design consultancy, Event Communications, had won an international competition to design a new House of Fairytales concept for the Hans Christian Andersen Museum (also called the New Hans Christian Andersen Museum). Kuma's designs revolve around "a series of cylindrical volumes with glass and latticed timber facades, and scooped green roofs". Event Communications said that the museum would follow an "immersive theatre" that "taps into a fundamental aspect of fairytales – they are journeys where the line between the everyday and the transformative is blurred".

== The new museum (2021) ==
The new H.C. Andersens Hus opened on 30 June 2021 in the presence of Queen Margrethe II, with full opening on 1 December 2021. The museum comprises approximately 5,600 m2 of building, two-thirds of which is located underground, surrounded by around 9,000 m2 of gardens designed by MASU Planning. Kengo Kuma and Associates served as lead design architects (partner in charge: Yuki Ikeguchi), with Cornelius Vöge as assisting architects and C and W Architects as executive architects. The project was funded primarily by the A.P. Møller Foundation, with contributions from Nordea-fonden, the Augustinus Foundation, Knud Højgaards Fond and the City of Odense.

The curatorial concept was developed by Odense City Museums under creative director Henrik Lübker, who led the process from its inception and formulated the museum’s guiding principle that it should not communicate about Andersen but as Andersen – using the narrative and performative strategies of the fairy tales themselves as the basis for the architecture, gardens and exhibition rather than presenting a biographical or historical account. The development followed an unusual sequence in which the curatorial vision and a separate content competition, won by Event Communications in 2015, preceded and framed the architectural competition. Lead architect Yuki Ikeguchi has described the sequencing as unprecedented for the firm – “the very first time we have done it this way around” – with the vision and the content competition informing the architectural design. Lübker described the result as “an existential museum” rather than a historical one. Danish media described him as a driving force behind the museum’s development; he left the position at the end of 2021.

Rather than displaying artefacts chronologically, the exhibition stages twelve of Andersen’s fairy tales as spatial and sensory experiences, created by an international group of artists including authors Kim Fupz Aakeson (Danish script) and Daniel Handler (English script), puppet maker Andy Gent, filmmaker Noah Harris, illustrator Sandra Rilova and animator Timothy David Orme. The visitor route ends at the small corner house traditionally regarded as Andersen’s birthplace, which is incorporated into the new museum.

The museum attracted substantial international press coverage upon opening, with features in outlets including Smithsonian Magazine, Artnet News and AFAR.

== Gallery ==
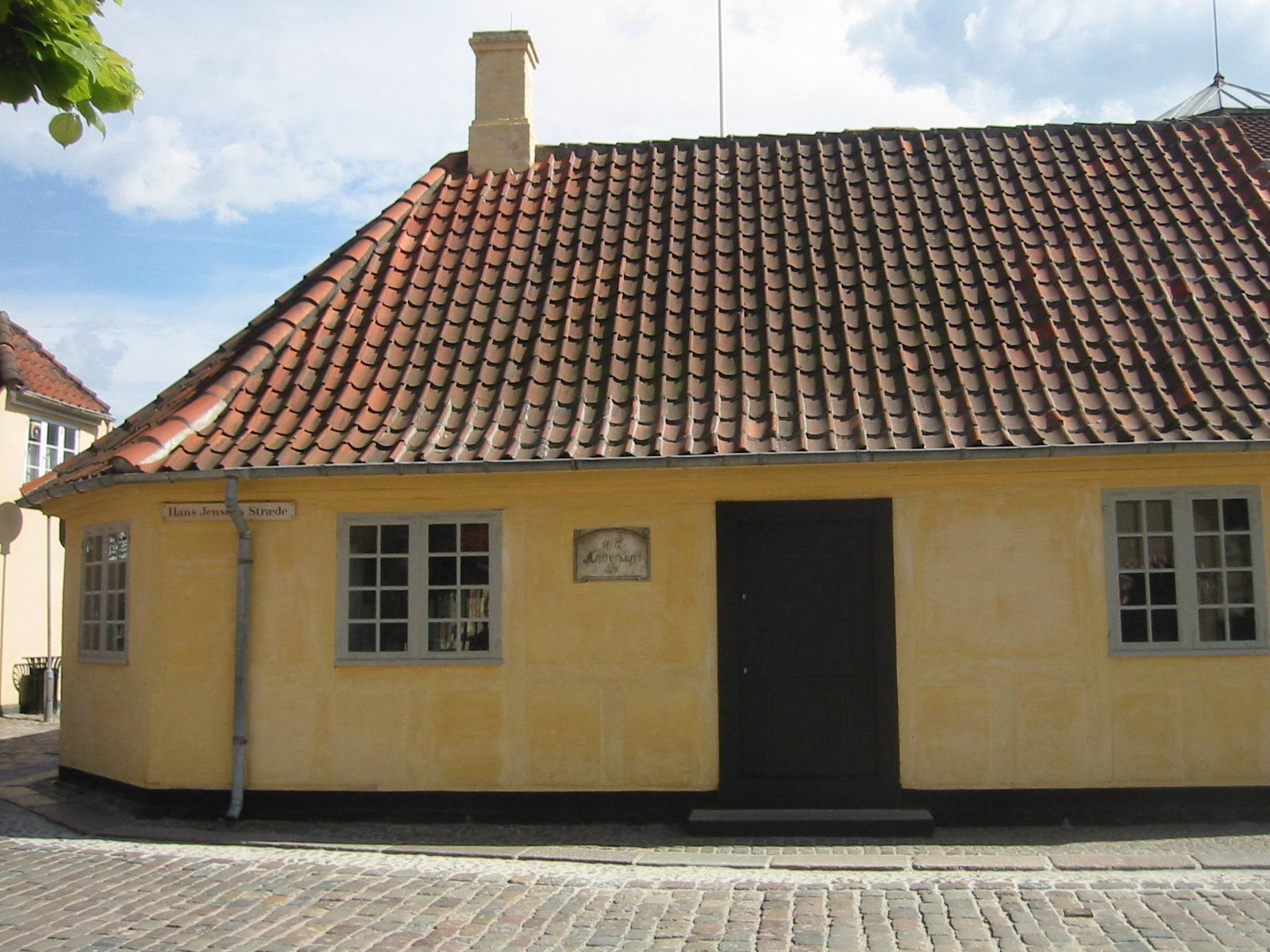
Birthplace and original museum
(45 Hans Jensens Stræde)

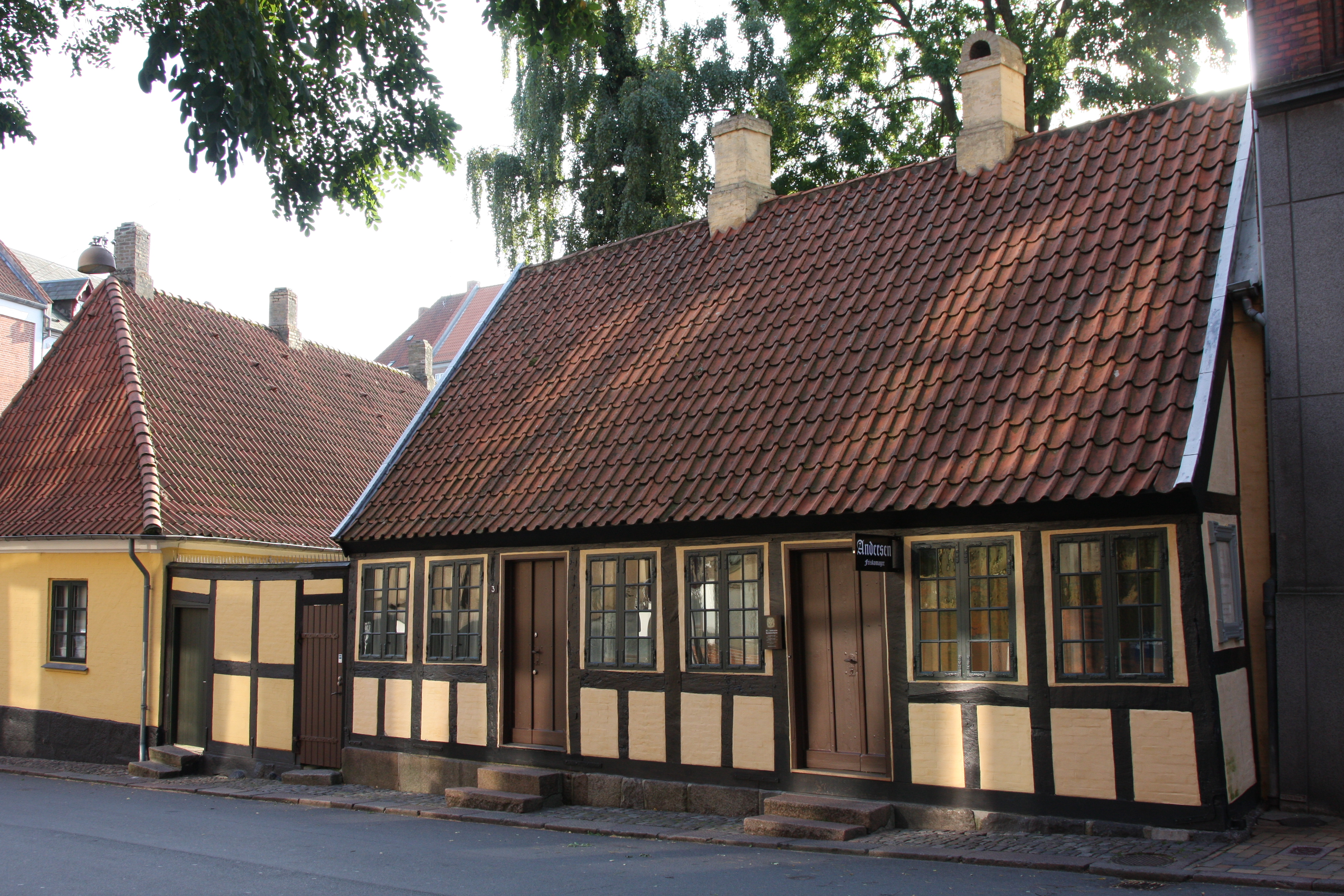
Childhood Home
(3-5 Munkemøllestræde)

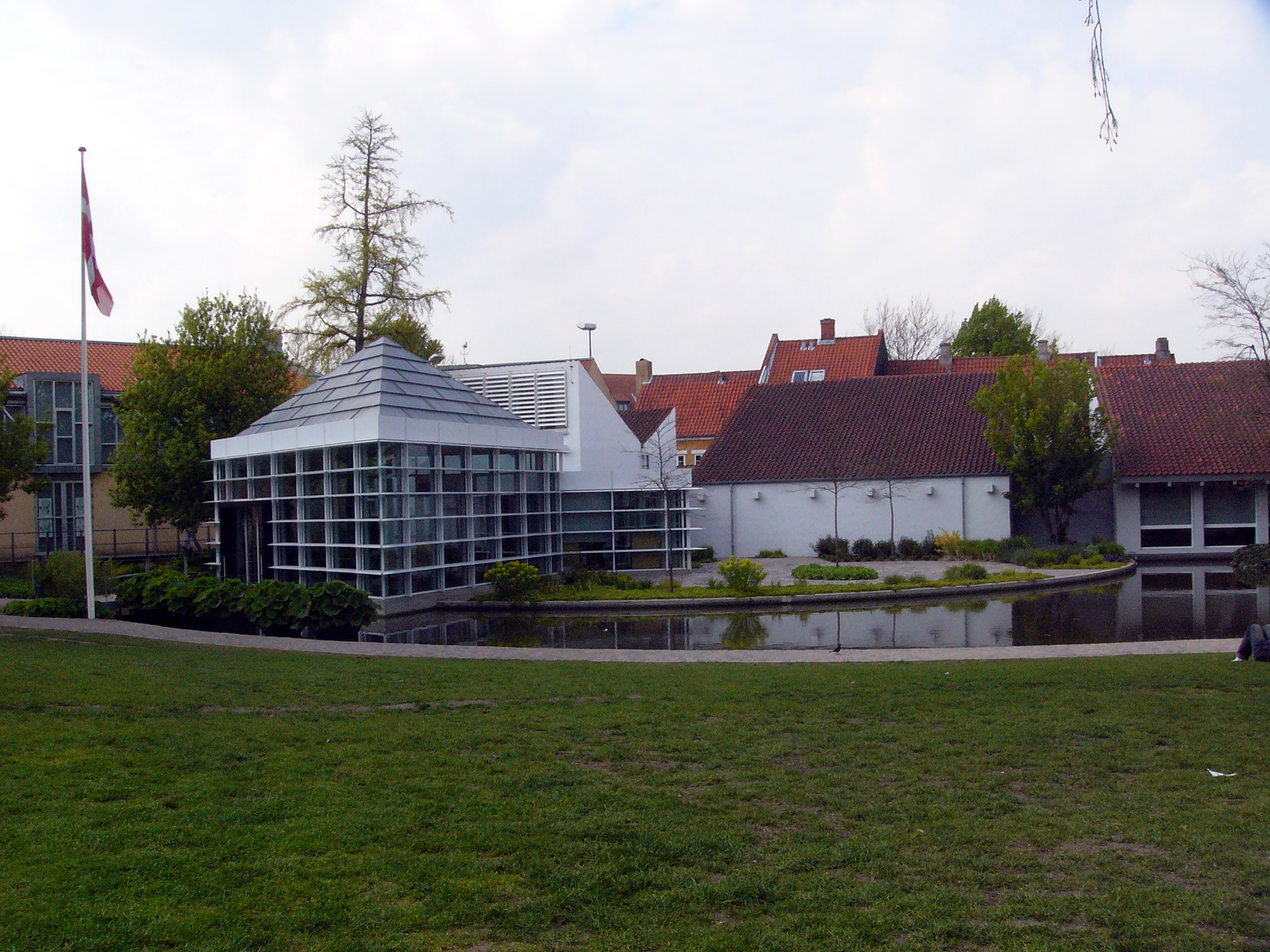
Former museum, rear view
(Bangs Boder 29)
