= Odense Palace =

Palace in the Danish city of Odense

Coordinates: 55°23′57″N 10°23′12″E

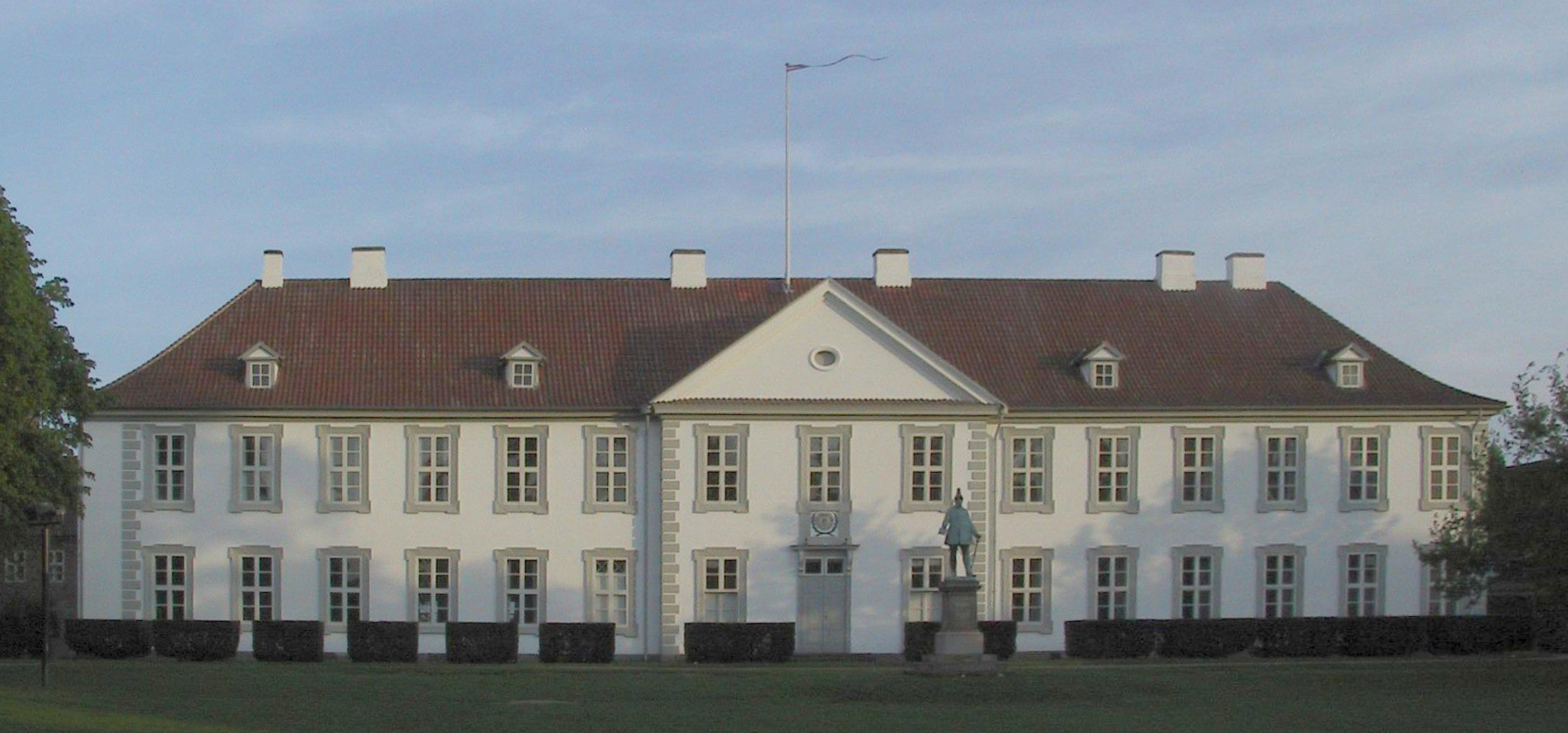
Odense Palace

Odense Palace (Danish: Odense Slot) in the city of Odense on the Danish island of Funen has its origins in a 15th-century monastery which passed to the Crown after the Reformation, and since then has served as an administrative building: in turn as a seigneurial residence, an amt administrator's residence, a governor's residence, and a municipal government building. The main white Baroque building with 13 bays was designed by J.C. Krieger and completed in 1723.

== Monastery ==
The Knights of St John are first mentioned in Odense in 1280. They appear to have acquired a monastery around 1400; during the next century it grew into their second largest and most important house in Denmark, after the mother house at Antvorskov. The south wing and the oldest part of the east wing date to the first half of the 15th century; there are walled-up windows and archways. The monastery church, St. John's, has many gravestones and coats of arms from influential families of the period; the church was frequented by the nobility, and many elderly aristocrats spent their final years in the monastery. In the churchyard there are ruins of the hospice, which was one of the most important social service institutions in mediaeval Odense.

== Palace ==
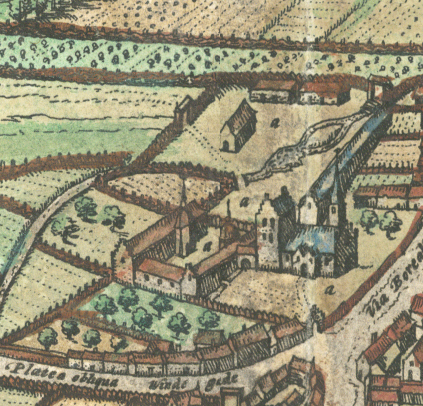
The oldest depiction of Odense Palace, from Braunius' map of 1593. The towers contain the stairs.

In 1536, after the Reformation, the monastery became the property of the king and was given the name Odensegård. The monastery's property was merged with that of Næsbyhoved Castle, under the name Odensegård Seigneury. The first holder of the estate was Claus Daa. The remaining monks were allowed to stay, but had to share the premises with him. The seigniors lived on their own properties in the summer and spent the winter at Odensegård. In the 1570s, Frederick II had the monastery rebuilt to better house the royal family when they stayed there. This rebuilding was completed in 1575, with the royal bedchambers and reception rooms being located in the west wing, the seigneurial residence in the east wing and the kitchen in the south. An additional story was added to all the wings, bringing them to their present height. The building then remained almost unchanged until 1720.

During the Dano-Swedish wars in the mid-17th century, Odense was occupied by the Swedes, some of whose troops were billeted in the palace. The furnishings were all destroyed, used as kindling for the fireplaces, and the building was a shell when the Swedes withdrew.

With the introduction of the absolute monarchy in 1660, Denmark replaced feudalism with government by amt, and the palace became the residence of the administrator of the Amt of Funen.

When the king arrived with his attendants and court (over 100 people), the amt administrator was responsible for accommodating them. Frederick IV made many circuits of his realm, and was dissatisfied with Odensegård. He therefore commissioned Johan Cornelius Krieger to rebuild the palace. Between 1721 and 1723, an entirely new main building was erected on the north side, containing a great hall that was used for banqueting, the Rosensal, and also new private chambers for the king and queen and many guest rooms. The king was pleased, especially with the new gardens, and visited several times; on 12 October 1730, he died there. After his death, the kings stayed at the palace only in passing, but the large complex was also used by foreign rulers on their way to and from Copenhagen.

During the Napoleonic Wars, the palace was used as a command centre by a succession of generals, including the French Marshal Jean-Baptiste Bernadotte, who later became King Charles XIV John of Sweden.

== Governor's residence ==
After Denmark lost Norway in 1814, the Crown Prince, later Christian VIII, who had been elected king there, was appointed governor of Funen and Langeland. His wife, Caroline Amalie, was very popular in Odense, where she took an active part in improving people's lives. From 1816 to 1847, Odense Palace was the seat of government on Funen by successive crown princes, and Odense became a little Copenhagen.

Hans Christian Andersen's mother worked at the palace, and the boy was invited there, where according to his own account in his autobiography, he acted out some scenes by Ludvig Holberg and improvised a song. As a young boy, Andersen also played with the young Prince Frits, later Frederick VII, who in turn was Governor of Funen from 1839 to 1848.

He spent much time in Odense, happy to be away from Copenhagen. He lived in the palace with his second wife, Mariane of Mecklenburg-Strelitz, and thoroughly restored it. However, the marriage broke down and an apartment was created on the ground floor for his mistress, Louise Rasmussen, later his morganatic wife as Countess Danner; a secret staircase led from there to the king's chambers.

On 20 January 1848 Frederick became king; when he soon afterwards left Odense to live in Copenhagen, the governorate was terminated.

== Museum and administrative building ==
Many of the large rooms in the palace were now unused, and in 1860 it was therefore decided to use part of the basement level as a museum. The exhibits had to be removed quickly in the Second Schleswig War, when the lowest floor of the palace was used as an infirmary, but were back in 1865 and after that constantly increased. In 1885 the collection was moved to a new building, now the Funen Museum of Art. In the years that followed, various government offices were moved into the palace. There were also several residential flats, and a strong military influence after the Funen Divisional Officers Library was established there in 1914.

The state sold the palace to the Municipality of Odense in 1907, after which the royal garden (King's Garden) was also opened to the public. In subsequent years various official services were housed there, such as the fire station and the amt council. The termination of the amt system in 2007 brought to a close almost 500 years of state administration in Odense. The palace is now used by the urban and cultural administration of the municipality, and has been newly renovated.
