= 2025 Odense municipal election =

Municipal election in Denmark

← 2021	18 November 2025	2029 →

All 29 seats to the Odense municipal council 15 seats needed for a majority
- Turnout: 118,530 (69.2%) ▲3.7%
	First party	Second party	Third party
	A	V	C
Party	Social Democrats	Venstre	Conservatives
Last election	10 seats, 31.3%	6 seats, 18.1%	6 seats, 18.5%
Seats won	10	5	4
Seat change	0	▼1	▼2
Popular vote	34,298	19,656	13,273
Percentage	29.6%	17.0%	11.5%
Swing	▼1.7%	▼1.1%	▼7.0%
	Fourth party	Fifth party	Sixth party
	F	B	Ø
Party	Green Left	Social Liberals	Red-Green Alliance
Last election	2 seats, 8.3%	2 seats, 7.9%	2 seats, 6.3%
Seats won	3	2	2
Seat change	▲1	0	0
Popular vote	12,151	8,175	7,716
Percentage	10.5%	7.1%	6.7%
Swing	▲2.2%	▼0.8%	▲0.4%
	Seventh party	Eighth party
	I	O
Party	Liberal Alliance	Danish People's Party
Last election	0 seats, 1.0%	0 seats, 2.4%
Seats won	2	1
Seat change	▲2	▲1
Popular vote	6,589	6,108
Percentage	5.7%	5.3%
Swing	▲4.7%	▲2.8%
Mayor before election
Peter Rahbæk Juhl
Social Democrats
Mayor after election
Peter Rahbæk Juel
Social Democrats

The 2025 Odense Municipal election was held on 18 November 2025, to elect the 29 members to sit in the regional council for the Odense Municipal council, in the period of 2026 to 2029. Peter Rahbæk Juel from the Social Democrats, would win the mayoral position.

== Background ==
Following the 2021 election, Peter Rahbæk Juel from Social Democrats became mayor for his second term. The Social Democrats has held the mayoral position in the municipality, since 2010, but is in danger of a worsened result compared to 2021. However, Rahbæk Juel, would run for re-election.

== Electoral system ==
For elections to Danish municipalities, a number varying from 9 to 31 are chosen to be elected to the municipal council. The seats are then allocated using the D'Hondt method and a closed list proportional representation. Odense Municipality had 29 seats in 2025.

== Electoral alliances ==
=== Electoral Alliance 1 ===
Party		Political alignment
A	Social Democrats	Centre-left
B	Social Liberals	Centre to Centre-left
F	Green Left	Centre-left to Left-wing
M	Moderates	Centre to Centre-right

=== Electoral Alliance 2 ===
Party		Political alignment
C	Conservatives	Centre-right
K	Christian Democrats	Centre to Centre-right
L	Et Bedre Odense	Local politics
V	Venstre	Centre-right
Æ	Denmark Democrats	Right-wing to Far-right

=== Electoral Alliance 3 ===
Party		Political alignment
E	Lokallisten Nyt Odense	Local politics
G	Stabilt Demokrati	Local politics

=== Electoral Alliance 4 ===
Party		Political alignment
I	Liberal Alliance	Centre-right to Right-wing
O	Danish People's Party	Right-wing to Far-right
U	Det starter i Odense	Local politics

=== Electoral Alliance 5 ===
Party		Political alignment
Q	Independent Greens	Left-wing
Ø	Red-Green Alliance	Left-wing to Far-Left
Å	The Alternative	Centre-left to Left-wing

== Results by polling station ==
Division	A	B	C	E	F	G	I	K	L	M	O	Q	U	V	Æ	Ø	Å
Division	%	%	%	%	%	%	%	%	%	%	%	%	%	%	%	%	%
Skt. Jørgens Hallen	25.5	10.1	10.1	0.0	12.2	0.9	6.5	0.1	0.3	2.2	4.2	0.3	0.2	14.3	1.1	10.4	1.6
Marienlystcentret	33.7	7.0	9.2	0.1	12.1	0.7	5.4	0.1	0.6	1.4	5.0	0.3	0.3	14.7	1.1	7.3	1.0
Risingskolen	30.0	9.9	8.3	0.0	13.3	0.5	4.7	0.3	0.4	2.2	4.9	1.1	0.3	12.4	0.9	9.4	1.4
Munkebjergskolen	27.5	10.6	11.2	0.2	11.7	0.5	7.1	0.1	0.4	2.0	3.7	0.3	0.3	14.7	1.4	6.7	1.5
Ejerslykkeskolen	31.9	9.4	7.6	0.2	11.4	1.0	4.5	0.2	0.3	2.1	5.5	0.8	0.2	11.4	1.9	10.7	1.1
Agedrup Skole	35.7	2.8	11.9	0.0	8.5	1.4	5.4	0.0	0.2	3.4	8.4	0.3	0.3	14.3	3.5	3.6	0.3
Fjordager-Hallen	34.6	6.3	9.8	0.1	10.8	1.1	4.3	0.2	0.3	1.9	6.7	0.5	0.3	13.1	2.4	7.0	0.6
Fraugde Fritidscenter	26.5	5.2	11.9	0.1	9.7	1.6	5.1	0.4	1.0	1.7	9.3	0.2	0.4	17.2	2.5	5.8	1.3
UCL Seebladsgade	25.0	10.7	11.4	0.0	11.4	0.4	7.4	0.1	0.3	2.5	3.6	0.2	0.3	14.6	1.1	9.6	1.5
CSV-Skolen	31.6	6.3	9.7	0.2	11.5	1.3	5.6	0.2	0.4	1.9	6.4	0.4	0.4	12.1	1.7	9.2	1.1
Lumby Skole	24.9	1.4	14.7	0.0	8.8	1.4	5.6	0.0	0.3	0.9	8.4	0.4	0.6	22.6	4.3	5.2	0.4
Stige Skole	33.0	2.7	11.4	0.1	9.0	0.8	5.2	0.2	0.6	1.8	7.4	0.1	0.3	19.8	3.5	3.3	0.8
Spurvelundskolen	29.0	3.6	12.0	0.1	8.7	1.6	5.2	0.2	0.4	1.6	8.1	0.2	0.4	20.9	3.8	3.6	0.6
Kroggårdsskolen	34.2	4.2	10.7	0.0	10.9	0.7	4.9	0.2	0.2	1.5	6.5	0.2	0.3	17.1	3.1	4.5	0.7
Tarup Skole	31.9	5.2	11.9	0.0	9.8	0.5	4.0	0.1	0.3	1.4	5.4	0.1	0.4	23.1	2.0	3.7	0.4
Paarup Hallen	32.8	4.3	10.2	0.0	9.2	0.7	5.3	0.1	0.5	1.1	5.1	0.2	0.1	23.5	2.6	4.0	0.4
Korup Skole	29.7	3.0	14.2	0.2	8.8	1.1	4.9	0.1	0.6	1.2	6.7	0.1	0.3	22.3	3.0	3.2	0.8
Ubberud Kultur og Bevægelseshus	27.5	3.8	12.9	0.1	7.3	1.9	6.7	0.5	0.4	1.8	6.3	0.2	0.5	19.5	4.8	4.8	0.8
Rådhuset, Rådhushallen	25.7	10.4	13.5	0.0	11.2	0.5	6.4	0.1	0.3	1.7	3.6	0.2	0.2	15.8	1.0	8.0	1.4
Sct. Knuds Gymnasium	26.5	7.2	17.2	0.0	7.2	0.3	6.5	0.1	0.3	1.1	2.6	0.0	0.2	25.9	0.8	3.2	0.6
Rosengårdskolen	28.3	8.2	10.6	0.1	11.6	0.6	6.5	0.1	0.5	2.1	5.1	0.3	0.3	14.8	1.7	7.7	1.3
Sanderumhallen	30.7	4.2	12.8	0.1	8.6	0.6	5.4	0.2	0.4	1.3	5.6	0.1	0.3	22.9	2.4	3.8	0.5
Rasmus Rask-Skolen	32.6	3.1	12.9	0.1	5.9	0.5	6.7	0.4	0.4	1.5	5.2	0.0	0.2	25.4	2.5	2.3	0.3
Tingløkkeskolen	30.8	6.8	14.4	0.0	9.7	0.6	5.8	0.0	0.2	2.4	3.8	0.3	0.2	18.4	1.9	3.9	0.7
Dalumskolen	30.0	6.3	12.8	0.1	11.2	0.7	5.5	0.2	0.5	1.7	5.4	0.1	0.2	16.7	2.3	5.4	1.0
Skt. Klemensskolen	25.9	4.9	14.9	0.1	10.0	0.6	5.7	0.0	0.4	2.0	4.5	0.2	0.3	22.7	2.9	4.5	0.5
Fangel Forsamlingshus	27.0	4.9	14.1	0.2	5.1	0.8	3.8	0.0	0.2	1.0	7.8	0.0	0.2	25.9	4.9	3.2	1.0
Højby Skole	28.2	5.2	13.0	0.2	9.0	1.1	6.0	0.1	0.6	2.0	6.3	0.1	0.3	19.7	3.2	4.2	0.9
Camp U	28.3	14.8	5.0	0.1	12.2	0.8	2.1	0.1	0.2	7.1	5.2	1.4	0.1	5.3	1.2	15.7	0.6
UngOdense (Tidl.Bækholmskolen)	31.7	5.5	9.6	0.0	13.8	0.9	4.6	0.2	0.5	1.6	7.0	0.1	0.2	11.5	1.9	9.4	1.4

== Results ==
Party		Votes	%	+/-	Seats	+/-
Odense Municipality
A	Social Democrats	34,298	29.59	-1.71	10	0
V	Venstre	19,656	16.96	-1.10	5	-1
C	Conservatives	13,273	11.45	-7.02	4	-2
F	Green Left	12,151	10.48	+2.18	3	+1
B	Social Liberals	8,175	7.05	-0.80	2	0
Ø	Red-Green Alliance	7,716	6.66	+0.38	2	0
I	Liberal Alliance	6,589	5.69	+4.72	2	+2
O	Danish People's Party	6,108	5.27	+2.84	1	+1
Æ	Denmark Democrats	2,308	1.99	New	0	New
M	Moderates	2,260	1.95	New	0	New
Å	The Alternative	1,140	0.98	+0.62	0	0
G	Stabilt Demokrati	899	0.78	New	0	New
L	Et Bedre Odense	445	0.38	+0.10	0	0
U	Det starter i Odense	318	0.27	New	0	New
Q	Independent Greens	316	0.27	New	0	New
K	Christian Democrats	158	0.14	-0.29	0	0
E	Lokallisten Nyt Odense	87	0.08	-0.03	0	0
Total		115,897	100	N/A	29	N/A
Invalid votes		408	0.24	-0.04		
Blank votes		2,225	1.30	+0.14		
Turnout		118,530	69.22	+3.69		
Source: valg.dk

== Opinion polls ==
Polling firm	Fieldwork date	Sample size	A	C	V	F	B	Ø	O	I	K	Å	L	E	G	M	Q	Æ	Others	Lead
Epinion	4 Sep - 13 Oct 2025	575	29.6	9.7	16.0	11.1	5.6	7.4	4.3	7.0	–	2.7	–	–	–	1.4	–	4.9	0.4	13.6
2024 european parliament election	9 Jun 2024		18.3	9.5	11.4	19.2	8.2	8.1	5.4	6.5	–	3.5	–	–	–	5.9	–	4.1	–	0.9
2022 general election	1 Nov 2022		29.8	6.1	10.7	9.6	4.2	5.8	2.1	7.6	0.4	3.3	–	–	–	10.8	1.9	5.1	–	19.0
2021 regional election	16 Nov 2021		26.8	11.2	27.7	8.7	8.5	7.1	2.8	1.2	0.7	0.6	–	–	–	–	–	–	–	0.9
2021 municipal election	16 Nov 2021		31.3 (10)	18.5 (6)	18.1 (6)	8.3 (2)	7.9 (2)	6.3 (2)	2.4 (0)	1.0 (0)	0.4 (0)	0.4 (0)	0.3 (0)	0.1 (0)	–	–	–	–	–	12.8
