= 2021 Odense municipal election =

- 16 November 2021

All 29 seats to the Odense Municipal Council 15 seats needed for a majority
- Turnout: 109,398 (65.5%) ▼4.5pp
	First party	Second party	Third party
	A	C	V
Party	Social Democrats	Conservatives	Venstre
Last election	13 seats, 41.8%	3 seats, 8.6%	6 seats, 19.2%
Seats won	10	6	6
Seat change	▼3	▲3	0
Popular vote	33,458	19,742	19,300
Percentage	31.3%	18.5%	18.1%
Swing	▼10.5%	▲9.9%	▼1.1%
	Fourth party	Fifth party	Sixth party
	F	B	Ø
Party	Green Left	Social Liberals	Red–Green Alliance
Last election	1 seat, 5.0%	1 seat, 4.7%	2 seats, 6.6%
Seats won	2	2	2
Seat change	▲1	▲1	0
Popular vote	8,876	8,393	6,712
Percentage	8.3%	7.8%	6.3%
Swing	▲3.3%	▲3.1%	▼0.3%
	Seventh party	Eighth party	Ninth party
	D	O	Å
Party	New Right	Danish People's Party	The Alternative
Last election	0 seats, 0.8%	2 seats, 6.4%	1 seat, 3.1%
Seats won	1	0	0
Seat change	▲1	▼2	▼1
Popular vote	3,340	2,594	385
Percentage	3.1%	2.4%	0.4%
Swing	▲2.3%	▼4.0%	▼2.7%
Mayor before election
Peter Rahbæk Juhl
Social Democrats
Mayor after election
Peter Rahbæk Juhl
Social Democrats

All three elections, following the 2007 municipal reform, had resulted in the Social Democrats becoming the biggest party and having a majority behind them to hold the mayor position.

The Social Democrats had won 13 seats in the last election, just 2 short of an absolute majority. Parties of the traditional red bloc had enjoyed great success in Odense Municipality, having won 17 seats in 2009, 15 in 2013 and 18 in 2017. Therefore, it was expected that they would once again win a majority, and that Peter Rahbæk Juhl would have a second term.

When all the votes were counted, the Social Democrats would suffer the biggest losses. They would lose 3 seats, and decrease their vote share by 10.5%. This trend was seen in the 4 largest municipalities. However, both the Social Liberals and Green Left would gain a seat, and the red bloc parties would win 16 seats. A constitution was announced on 18 November 2021, which confirmed that Peter Rahbæk Juhl would continue as mayor.

== Electoral system ==
For elections to Danish municipalities, a number varying from 9 to 31 are chosen to be elected to the municipal council. The seats are then allocated using the D'Hondt method and a closed list proportional representation. Odense Municipality had 29 seats in 2021

Unlike in Danish General Elections, in elections to municipal councils, electoral alliances are allowed.

== Electoral alliances ==
=== Electoral Alliance 1 ===
Party		Political alignment
A	Social Democrats	Centre-left
B	Social Liberals	Centre to Centre-left
F	Green Left	Centre-left to Left-wing

=== Electoral Alliance 2 ===
Party		Political alignment
G	Vegan Party	Single-issue
Ø	Red–Green Alliance	Left-wing to Far-Left
Å	The Alternative	Centre-left to Left-wing

=== Electoral Alliance 3 ===
Party		Political alignment
C	Conservatives	Centre-right
K	Christian Democrats	Centre to Centre-right
L	Et Bedre Odense	Local politics
O	Danish People's Party	Right-wing to Far-right
V	Venstre	Centre-right

=== Electoral Alliance 4 ===
Party		Political alignment
D	New Right	Right-wing to Far-right
E	Lokalisten Nyt Odense	Local politics
I	Liberal Alliance	Centre-right to Right-wing
J	Liberaterne	Local politics
Z	De LokalNationale	Local politics

== Results by polling station ==
E = Lokalisten Nyt Odense
J = Liberaterne
L = Et Bedre Odense
Z = De LokalNationale

Division	A	B	C	D	E	F	G	I	J	K	L	O	V	Z	Æ	Ø	Å
Division	%	%	%	%	%	%	%	%	%	%	%	%	%	%	%	%	%
Skt. Jørgens Hallen	27.9	12.6	17.1	2.3	0.1	9.3	0.6	1.3	0.9	0.4	0.2	1.4	15.0	0.1	0.3	10.1	0.6
Sct. Hans Skole	36.8	9.1	13.9	2.9	0.1	10.1	0.4	1.0	1.3	0.4	0.3	2.3	13.4	0.1	0.2	7.5	0.4
Risingskolen	36.4	9.1	12.5	2.5	0.2	10.4	0.4	0.7	1.0	0.4	0.3	2.2	13.0	0.2	0.4	9.4	0.9
Munkebjergskolen	29.0	11.4	17.1	2.2	0.1	8.3	0.5	1.3	1.1	0.3	0.4	1.5	18.6	0.1	0.2	7.4	0.4
Fraugde Fritidscenter	30.7	6.8	19.1	4.7	0.2	6.8	0.3	0.8	1.4	0.5	0.8	3.9	18.5	0.1	0.2	4.6	0.6
Fjordager-Hallen	42.4	4.3	15.2	3.8	0.2	8.1	0.3	0.4	1.2	0.2	0.2	4.0	14.3	0.1	0.2	4.9	0.3
Agedrup Skole	39.6	2.6	17.3	7.4	0.1	5.7	0.1	0.6	1.4	0.1	0.2	3.9	18.3	0.1	0.1	2.1	0.3
Ejerslykkeskolen	39.8	7.7	11.9	2.9	0.1	8.8	0.6	1.1	1.1	0.5	0.5	2.4	12.9	0.3	0.3	8.4	0.7
Seniorhus Odense	25.0	14.8	15.8	2.1	0.0	8.8	0.6	1.7	1.0	0.2	0.2	0.8	18.0	0.1	0.3	9.9	0.7
CSV-Skolen	39.0	6.7	13.5	3.1	0.2	8.4	0.8	0.9	0.8	0.3	0.3	3.5	14.5	0.3	0.3	7.2	0.4
Lumby Skole	27.2	3.4	20.2	6.6	0.0	7.2	0.2	0.5	0.3	0.3	0.2	5.3	22.3	0.3	0.5	5.3	0.5
Stige Skole	34.1	3.1	20.3	3.8	0.1	6.7	0.2	0.7	1.4	0.3	0.3	3.5	21.2	0.3	0.2	3.6	0.3
Paarup Hallen	29.4	4.0	18.7	3.8	0.0	8.0	0.3	1.0	1.1	0.6	0.3	2.4	26.4	0.5	0.1	3.3	0.2
Tarup Skole	30.1	5.0	19.7	2.9	0.1	9.0	0.2	0.6	1.6	0.3	0.4	2.4	23.8	0.3	0.1	3.4	0.1
Kroggårdsskolen	35.6	4.8	18.6	3.8	0.1	7.7	0.4	0.4	1.6	0.5	0.2	2.8	19.0	0.1	0.2	3.9	0.1
Spurvelundskolen	30.7	4.2	18.9	4.6	0.3	7.6	0.4	0.9	2.4	0.7	0.4	3.8	21.9	0.2	0.2	2.8	0.2
Korup Skole	31.1	4.1	21.8	4.2	0.0	6.3	0.2	1.0	1.4	0.3	0.5	3.5	22.2	0.5	0.2	2.5	0.2
Ubberud Kultur & Bevægelseshus	24.3	4.8	20.7	5.8	0.1	7.2	0.5	0.6	1.3	0.9	0.4	3.3	24.9	0.4	0.2	4.4	0.1
Rådhuset	25.4	11.8	20.9	2.1	0.1	8.0	0.7	1.3	1.5	0.3	0.3	1.3	16.9	0.1	0.2	8.7	0.3
Sct. Knuds Gymnasium	20.6	9.2	29.3	2.7	0.1	6.4	0.3	1.0	2.0	0.4	0.0	0.9	23.2	0.0	0.0	3.8	0.1
Tingløkkeskolen	28.5	7.7	23.1	2.6	0.0	9.1	0.4	1.2	1.6	0.3	0.2	1.9	19.0	0.0	0.1	4.0	0.2
Rasmus Rask-Skolen	24.7	3.8	23.7	3.9	0.1	5.6	0.2	0.8	0.9	2.1	0.4	3.0	27.6	0.2	0.1	2.8	0.1
Sanderumhallen	30.2	5.3	22.1	3.1	0.1	7.2	0.3	0.5	1.2	0.3	0.2	2.8	21.7	0.2	0.2	4.4	0.2
Rosengårdskolen	30.3	9.8	18.4	2.9	0.1	8.7	0.9	1.2	1.0	0.4	0.4	2.0	15.7	0.1	0.3	7.2	0.6
Dalumskolen	31.2	6.4	21.3	3.4	0.1	8.2	0.4	0.9	0.9	0.4	0.3	3.0	17.2	0.3	0.2	5.4	0.4
Skt. Klemensskolen	26.1	5.6	27.4	3.7	0.3	6.7	0.2	1.3	1.0	1.0	0.3	2.2	19.1	0.2	0.2	4.9	0.1
Højby Skole	29.9	5.6	21.9	3.7	0.2	7.0	0.2	0.7	0.7	0.3	0.3	3.4	20.4	0.2	0.6	4.5	0.5
Fangel Forsamlingshus	22.9	3.5	25.1	4.6	0.0	7.1	0.2	0.9	0.9	0.7	0.5	4.8	24.0	0.4	0.5	3.5	0.4
UngOdense (Tidl.Bækholmskolen)	34.4	8.2	14.2	3.5	0.2	10.6	0.5	0.7	0.6	0.3	0.3	3.3	13.5	0.3	0.4	8.7	0.4
Camp U	50.8	6.1	6.3	1.8	0.2	14.1	0.3	0.4	0.8	0.4	0.2	2.5	5.7	0.1	0.3	9.9	0.2

== Results ==
Party		Votes	%	+/-	Seats	+/-
Odense Municipality
A	Social Democrats	33,458	31.30	-10.54	10	-3
C	Conservatives	19,742	18.47	+9.83	6	+3
V	Venstre	19,300	18.06	-1.19	6	0
F	Green Left	8,876	8.30	+3.28	2	+1
B	Social Liberals	8,393	7.85	+3.17	2	+1
Ø	Red-Green Alliance	6,712	6.28	-0.28	2	0
D	New Right	3,340	3.12	+2.32	1	+1
O	Danish People's Party	2,594	2.43	-3.95	0	-2
J	Liberaterne	1,269	1.19	New	0	New
I	Liberal Alliance	1,036	0.97	-1.06	0	0
G	Vegan Party	483	0.45	New	0	New
K	Christian Democrats	456	0.43	+0.19	0	0
Å	The Alternative	385	0.36	-2.74	0	-1
L	Et Bedre Odense	307	0.29	-0.18	0	0
Æ	Freedom List	240	0.22	New	0	New
Z	De LokalNationale	178	0.17	New	0	New
E	Lokallisten Nyt Odense	115	0.11	New	0	New
Total		106,884	100	N/A	29	N/A
Invalid votes		470	0.28	-0.08		
Blank votes		2,044	1.22	+0.22		
Turnout		109,398	65.53	-4.52		
Source: valg.dk
