= Bullerup =

- Village
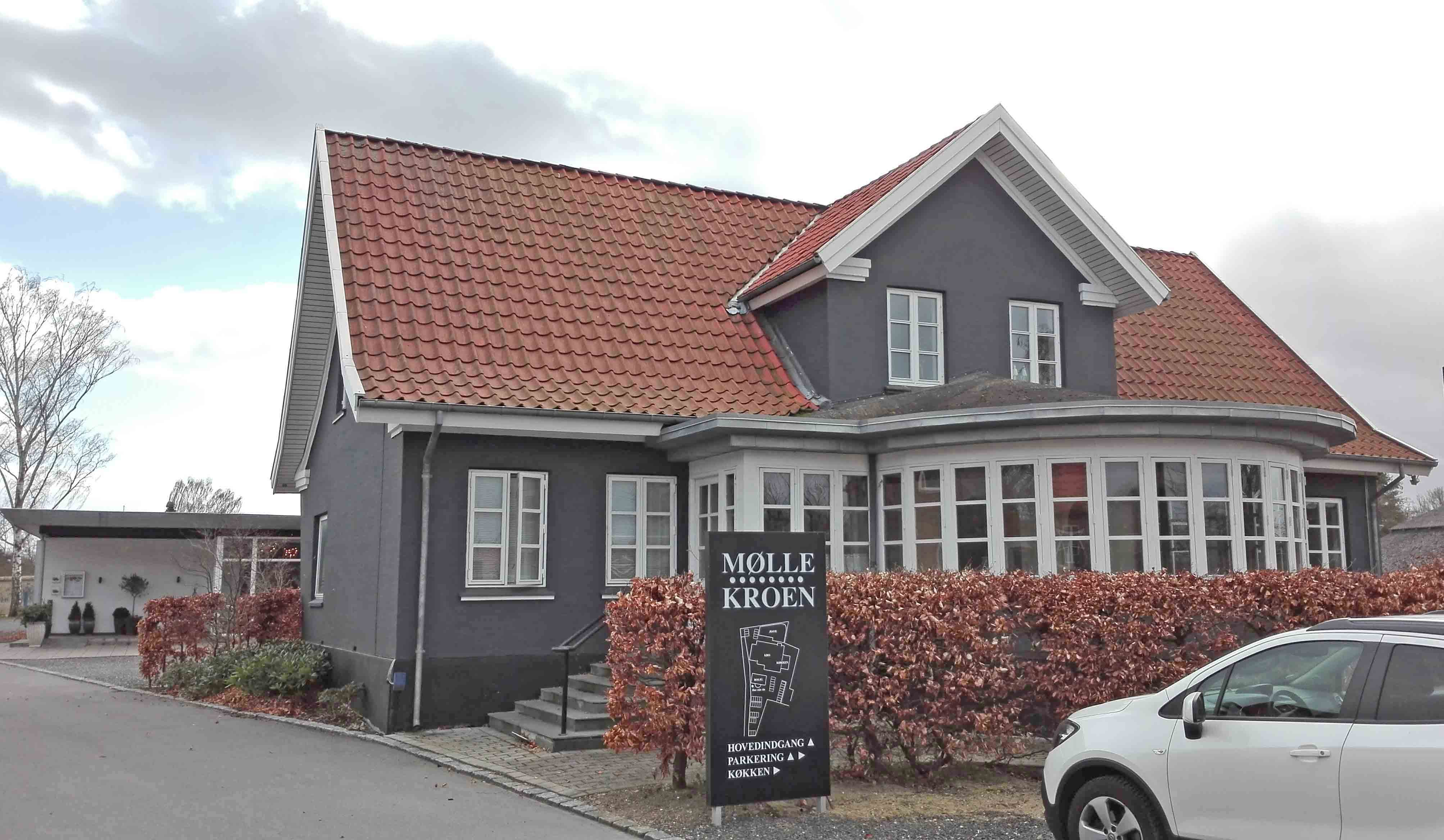

- Location in the Region of Southern Denmark
- Coordinates: 55°25′21″N 10°27′28″E
- Country: Denmark
- Region: Southern Denmark
- Municipality: Odense Municipality
- Time zone: UTC+1 (CET)
  - Summer (DST): UTC+2 (CEST)

Bullerup is a village and northeastern suburb of Odense, Funen, Denmark. It is located near Agedrup and Seden.
