= Ejlstrup =

- Town
- Location in the Region of Southern Denmark
- Coordinates: 55°24′25″N 10°15′50″E
- Country: Denmark
- Region: Southern Denmark
- Municipality: Odense Municipality

Area
  - Total: 0.6 km^{2} (0.23 sq mi)

Population (2026)
  - Total: 1,280
  - Density: 2,100/km^{2} (5,500/sq mi)
- Time zone: UTC+1 (CET)
  - Summer (DST): UTC+2 (CEST)

Ejlstrup is a village, with a population of 1,280 (1 January 2026), situated west of Odense, in Funen, Denmark. It lies to the south of Korup and north of Ubberud.
