= Stenløse =

Stenløse may refer to:

- Stenløse, Denmark
  - Stenløse Municipality
  - Stenløse station
  - Stenløse BK
- Stenløse, Odense, Denmark, see Odense Municipality#Neighbourhoods and settlements
