= Tusindårsskoven =

Forest in Odense, Denmark

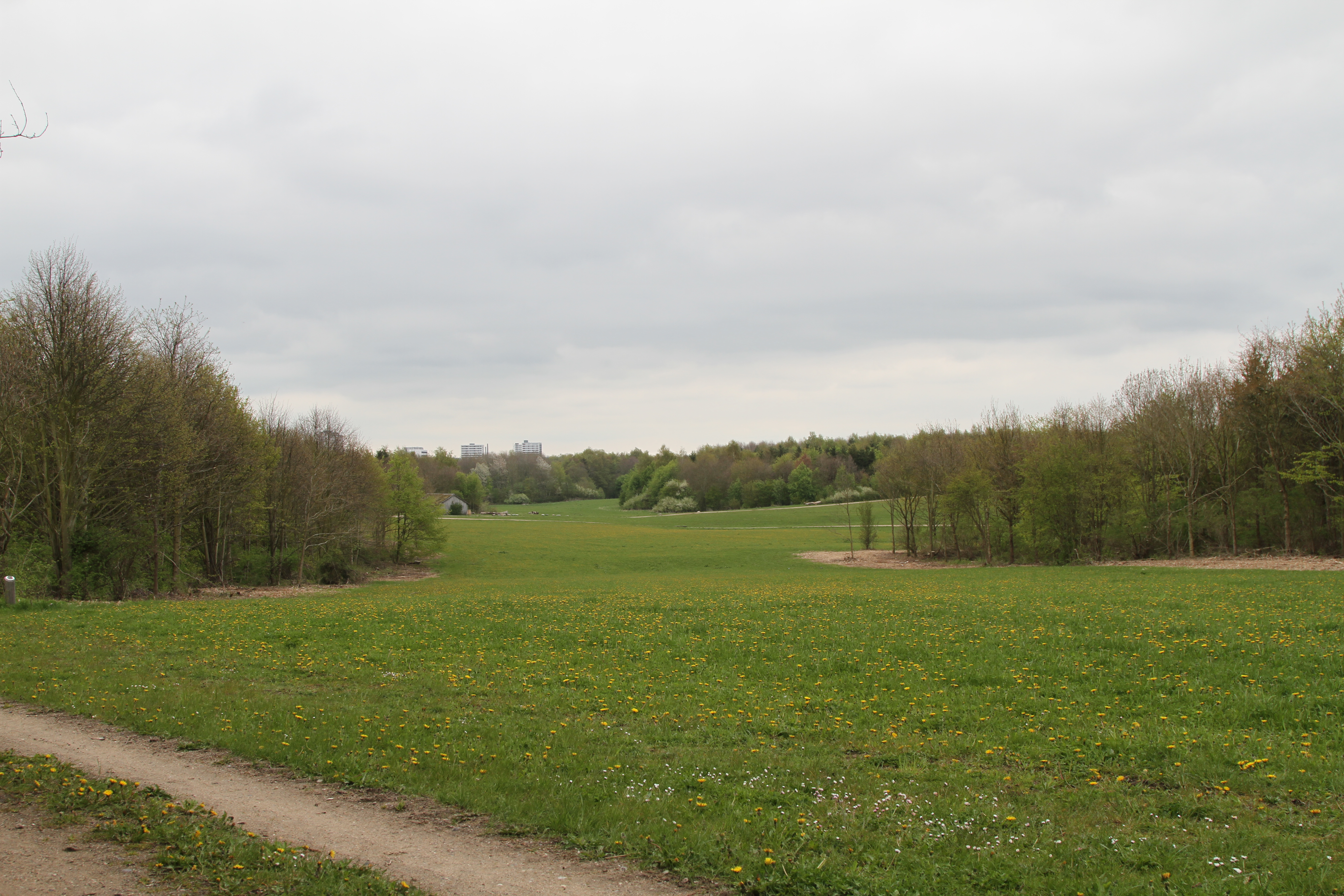
- Tusindårsskoven view

- Location within Denmark
- Interactive map of Tusindårsskoven

Geography
- Location: island of Odense, Denmark
- Coordinates: 55°22′56″N 10°20′32″E
- Area: 740 ha (1,800 acres)

Tusindårsskoven (meaning "The Thousand Year Forest") is a forest in southwestern Odense, Funen, Denmark. Measuring approximately 74,000 square metres (800,000 sq ft), it is located between the districts Bolbro and Sanderum, and is situated between the railway and the Odense Adventure Golf. The open grass area features a hill and is surrounded by newer afforestation. The forest was established in 1988, in connection with Odense Municipality's celebration of the city's thousandth anniversary.
