= Murkebjerg =

Munkebjerg
- Neighbourhood
- Location in the Region of Southern Denmark
- Coordinates: 55°22′55″N 10°24′42″E
- Country: Denmark
- Region: Southern Denmark
- Municipality: Odense Municipality
- Time zone: UTC+1 (CET)
  - Summer (DST): UTC+2 (CEST)

Munkebjerg is a central-southeastern neighbourhood of Odense, in Funen, Denmark.
