= 2003 in Denmark =

- Decades: 1980s; 1990s; 2000s; 2010s; 2020s
- See also: Other events of 2003; List of years in Denmark

Events from the year 2003 in Denmark.

== Incumbents ==
- Monarch – Margrethe II
- Prime minister – Anders Fogh Rasmussen

== Events ==
- 12 October – The second phase of the Copenhagen Metro opens, extending it to Vanløse

== The arts ==
=== Film ===
- 23 March – This Charming Man by Martin Strange-Hansen wins an Oscar for Best Short Subject at the 75th Academy Awards.
- 23 May – Christoffer Boe's film Reconstruction wins the Caméra d'Or at the 2003 Cannes Film Festival.

=== Music ===
- 15 November – The first ever Junior Eurovision Song Contest was held in Copenhagen, Denmark.

=== Television ===
- 24 November – DR series Nikolaj and Julie wins the Emmy Award for Best Drama Series at the 31st International Emmy Awards.

== Sports ==
=== Badminton ===
- 28 July – 3 August – Denmark wins one gold medal and two bronze medals at the 2003 IBF World Championships.

=== Cycling ===
- 15 July – Jakob Piil wins the 10th stage of the 2003 Tour de France.

=== Golf ===
- 22 June – Søren Kjeldsen wins the Diageo Championship at Gleneagles.
- 20 July – Thomas Bjørn wins the 2003 Open Championship.
- 23 November – Thomas Bjørn wins Dunlop Phoenix Tournament in Japan.

=== Football ===
- 29 May – Brøndby IF wins the 2002–03 Danish Cup by defeating FC Midtjylland 3–0 in the final.
- 11 October – Denmark draws with Bosnia and Herzegovina in the last round of in the UEFA Euro 2004 qualifying, but still wins Group 2 and was thus ready for UEFA Euro 2004.

=== Other ===
- 15 March – Wilson Kipketer wins silver in Menøs 800 metres at the 2003 IAAF World Indoor Championships in Birmingham, United Kingdom.
- 11 April – Mikkel Kessler wins the WBC International title by defeating Craig Cummings by a knockout in the third round.
- 15 June – Tom Kristensen wins the 2003 24 Hours of Le Mans as part of Team Bentley, his fifth win of the 24 Hours of Le Mans race.
- 24–28 September – Denmark wins a silver medal and a bronze medal at the 2003 World Taekwondo Championships.
- 4 October – Nicki Pedersen becomes Speedway World Champion by winning the 2003 Speedway Grand Prix series.

== Births ==
- 4 February – Rasmus Højlund, footballer
- 13 April – Lucas Hey, footballer
- 29 April – Holger Rune, tennis player
- 28 May – Valdemar Lund, footballer
- 12 June – Elias Jelert, footballer
- 24 October – Julia Kathrine Hansen, singer

== Deaths ==
- 17 April – Mogens Andersen, artist (died 1916)
- 4 May – Birgit Grodal, economist (born 1943)
- 26 July – Hilde Levi, physicist (born 1909)
- 28 July – Henning Holck-Larsen, engineer and Larsen & Toubro co-founder (born 1907)
- 18 August – Poul Vad, author and art historian (born 1927)
- 19 November – Hans Tabor, diplomat (born 1922)

=== Full date unknown ===
- Wermund Bendtsen, photographer (born 1917)

== See also ==
- 2003 in Danish television
