= Skibhusene =

- Suburb
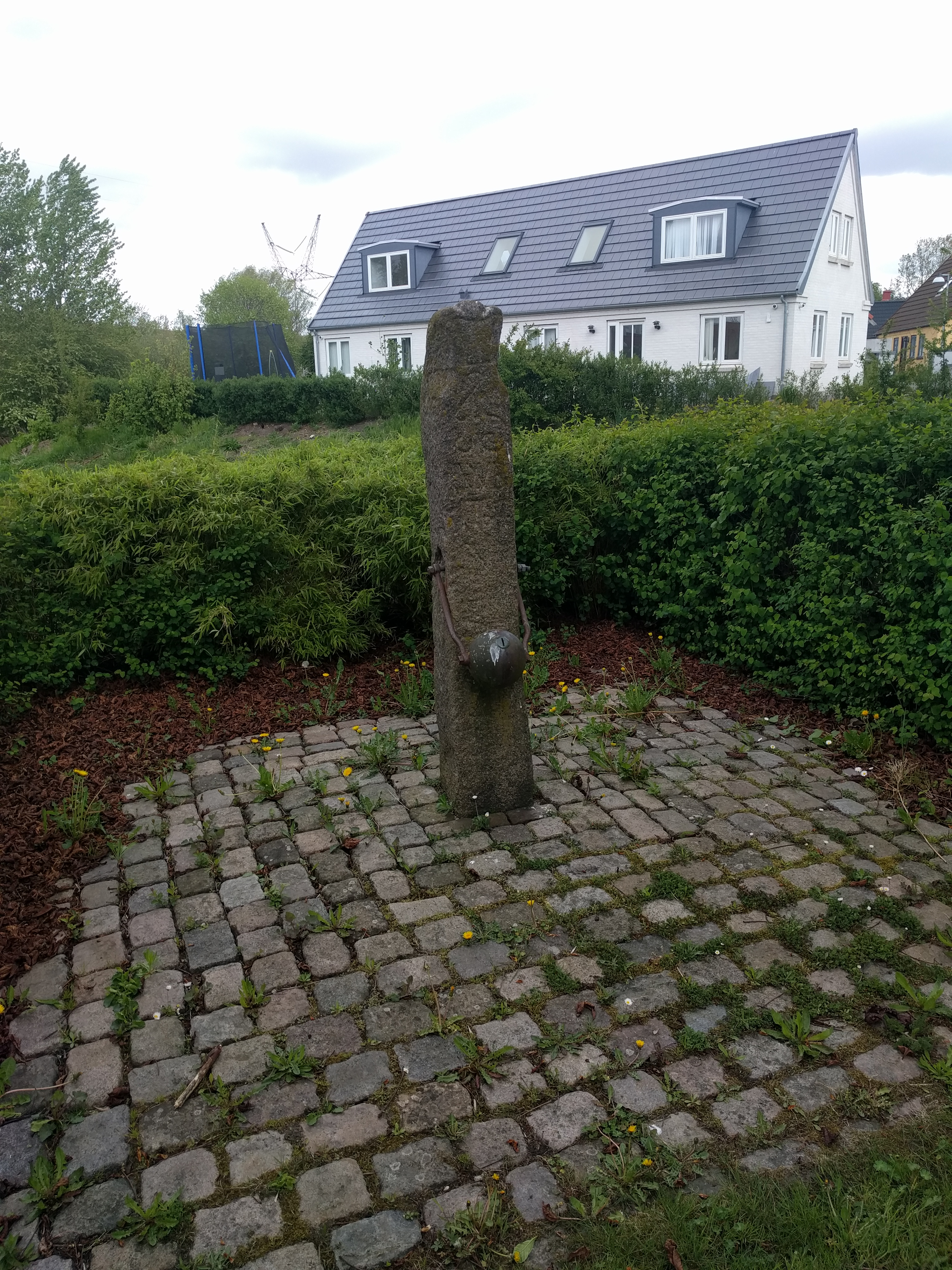

- Location in the Region of Southern Denmark
- Coordinates: 55°25′34″N 10°24′49″E
- Country: Denmark
- Region: Southern Denmark
- Municipality: Odense Municipality
- Time zone: UTC+1 (CET)
  - Summer (DST): UTC+2 (CEST)

Skibhusene is a small village and northeastern suburb of Odense, Denmark. The village is located at the end of Skibhusvej south of Odense Canal and industrial buildings. During the last decades the city of Odense has engulfed the village and today it is de facto a part of Odense.
