= 1917 in Denmark =

- Decades: 1890s; 1900s; 1910s; 1920s; 1930s
- See also: Other events of 1917; List of years in Denmark

Events from the year 1917 in Denmark.

== Incumbents ==
- Monarch – Christian X
- Prime minister – Carl Theodor Zahle

== Events ==
=== Undated ===
- Sovereignty of the Danish West Indies was officially transferred from Denmark to the United States, after the Treaty of the Danish West Indies was ratified.

== Sports ==
- 26 April – Silkeborg IF is founded.

=== Date unknown ===
- Kjøbenhavns Boldklub wins the 1916–17 Danish National Football Tournament by defeating Akademisk Boldklub 6–2 in the final.

== Births ==
- 14 June – Lise Nørgaard, writer (died 2023)
- 18 June – Erik Ortvad, painter and illustrator (died 2008)
- 4 October – Søren Georg Jensen, designer and sculptor (died 1982)
- 28 October – Wermund Bendtsen, photographer (died 2003)
- 27 November – Arne Sørensen, footballer (died 1977)

== Deaths ==
=== January–March ===
- 4 January – Carl Ludwig Jessen, painter (born 1833)
- 30 January – Gerhard Faye, factory manager (born 1846)
- 8 February – Thomas Arboe, architect (born 1836)
- 26 February – Hanna Hoffmann, sculptor and silversmith (born 1858)

=== April–June ===
- 5 May – Hans Smidth, painter (born 1839)
- 14 June – Vilhelm Herman Oluf Madsen, politician (born 1844)
- 22 June – Kristian Zahrtmann, painter (born 1843)

=== July–September ===
- 14 July – Anders Thiset, archivist (born 1850)
- 30 August – Otto Haslund, painter (born 1842)

=== October–December ===
- 28 October – Wermund Bendtsen, photographer (died 2003)
- 27 November – Christian Christiansen, physicist (born 1843)
- 9 December – Jakob Severin Deichmann Branth, theologian (born 1721)
- 18 December – Christine Daugaard, writer (born 1831)
- 20 December – August Hermann Ferdinand Carl Goos, politician and jurist (birn 1835)
- 21 December – Peter Gottfred Ramm, military officer, landowner and company founder (born 1834)
