= Dyrup =

City district in Odense, Denmark

Coordinates: 55°21′01″N 10°20′31″E

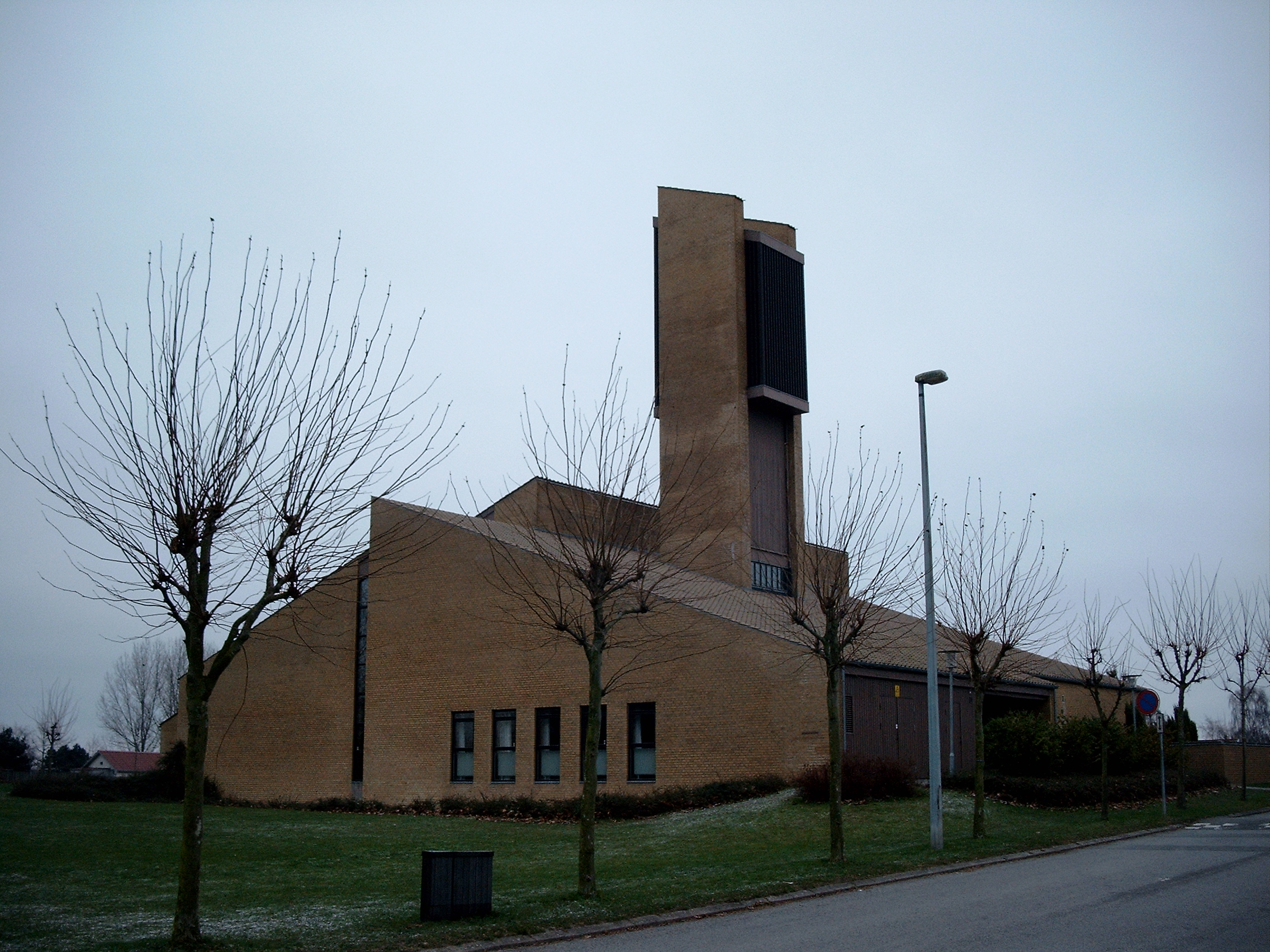
Dyrup church

Dyrup is a community and suburb of Odense, Denmark, along the green Odense River valley.

Before the 1950s, Dyrup had approximately 700 inhabitants, was mostly rural and part of Sanderum municipality and parish. It is mentioned in 1497 as "Dyroppe", but is significantly older and shares its name with old Dyrupgård. Today, Dyrup has approximately 4,500 inhabitants, is part of Odense Municipality and has its own church. Dyrup consists of bungalows, villas and some semis built from the late 1960s until today. Most children in Dyrup attend Højmeskolen, which has adjacent swimming and indoor sports centres, football pitches, etc. To the west is an active commercial district. Also Manchester United Goalkeeper Anders Lindegaard was born here.
