= Magnus Andersen (footballer, born 2006) =

Danish footballer (born 2006)

Personal information
- Full name: Magnus Hvitfeldt Andersen
- Date of birth: 3 April 2006 (age 20)
- Place of birth: Allesø, Denmark
- Position: Left winger

Team information
- Current team: OB
- Number: 21

Youth career
- Allesø GF
- Næsby BK
- OB

Senior career*
Years	Team	Apps	(Gls)
2025–	OB	3	(0)

International career^{‡}
2022	Denmark U-16	3	(0)
2024	Denmark U-18	4	(0)
2025–	Denmark U-19	3	(0)
- * Club domestic league appearances and goals as of 19:56, 11 January 2026 (UTC) ‡ National team caps and goals as of 19:56, 11 January 2026 (UTC)

Magnus Hvitfeldt Andersen (born 3 April 2006) is a Danish footballer who plays as a left winger for Danish Superliga club OB.

He is also known by the nickname “Krølle”, which means “Curly” in English.

== Club career ==
=== OB ===
Raised in Allesø, Andersen started his career at local club, Allesø GF, and later also played for Næsby Boldklub. As an U-13 player, he then joined OB. In OB, Andersen worked his way up through the youth sector.

On 7 September 2023, Andersen got his official debut for OB in a Danish Cup game against Tune IF. In July 2024, Andersen signed a new contract with OB until June 2026.

On 17 April 2025, 19-year old Andersen got his league debut for the club in a Danish 1st Division game against Kolding IF. He also made a substitute appearance in the following league match, before, three days later, signing a new contract with OB running until June 2029. At the same time, he was permanently promoted to the first-team squad from the following 2025–26 season.

== Honours ==
OB

- Danish 1st Division: 2024–25
