= Neder Holluf =

- Village
- Location in the Region of Southern Denmark
- Coordinates: 55°22′4″N 10°27′22″E
- Country: Denmark
- Region: Southern Denmark
- Municipality: Odense Municipality
- Time zone: UTC+1 (CET)
  - Summer (DST): UTC+2 (CEST)

Neder Holluf is a large village and southeastern suburb of Odense, in Funen, Denmark.
