= 1916 in Denmark =

- Decades: 1890s; 1900s; 1910s; 1920s; 1930s
- See also: Other events of 1916; List of years in Denmark

Events from the year 1916 in Denmark.

== Incumbents ==
- Monarch – Christian X
- Prime minister – Carl Theodor Zahle

== Events ==
=== February ===
- 6 February – Peter Hvidt, architect and furniture designer (died 1986)
- 7 February – The Society of Female Artists is founded.
- 22 February – The Conservative People's Party os founded.

=== April ===
- 16 April – The adoption of Retsplejeloven introduces a major reform of the Danish judicial system with effect from 1 October 1919.

=== July ===
- 11 July – The Gornbæk–Gilleleje extension of the Helsingør–Gornbæk Railway Line is inaugurated.

=== Augist ===
- 4 August – the Treaty of the Danish West Indies is signed, transferring sovereignty of the Danish West Indies from Denmark to the United States. The transaction was finalised in 1917.
- 31 August – The newspaper B.T. is established as a tabloid spinoff from Berlingske Ridende.

=== December ===
- 14 December – The 1916 Danish West Indian Islands sale referendum is held.
- 21 December – The Frederiksværk–Gundested extension of the Hillerød–Frederiksværk Railway Line iis inaugurated.
- 22 December – The Treaty of the Danish West Indies is ratified by the parliament (Rigsdagen).

== Sports ==
=== Date unknown ===
- B 93 wins the third Danish National Football Tournament by defeating Kjøbenhavns Boldklub 3–2 in the final

== Births ==
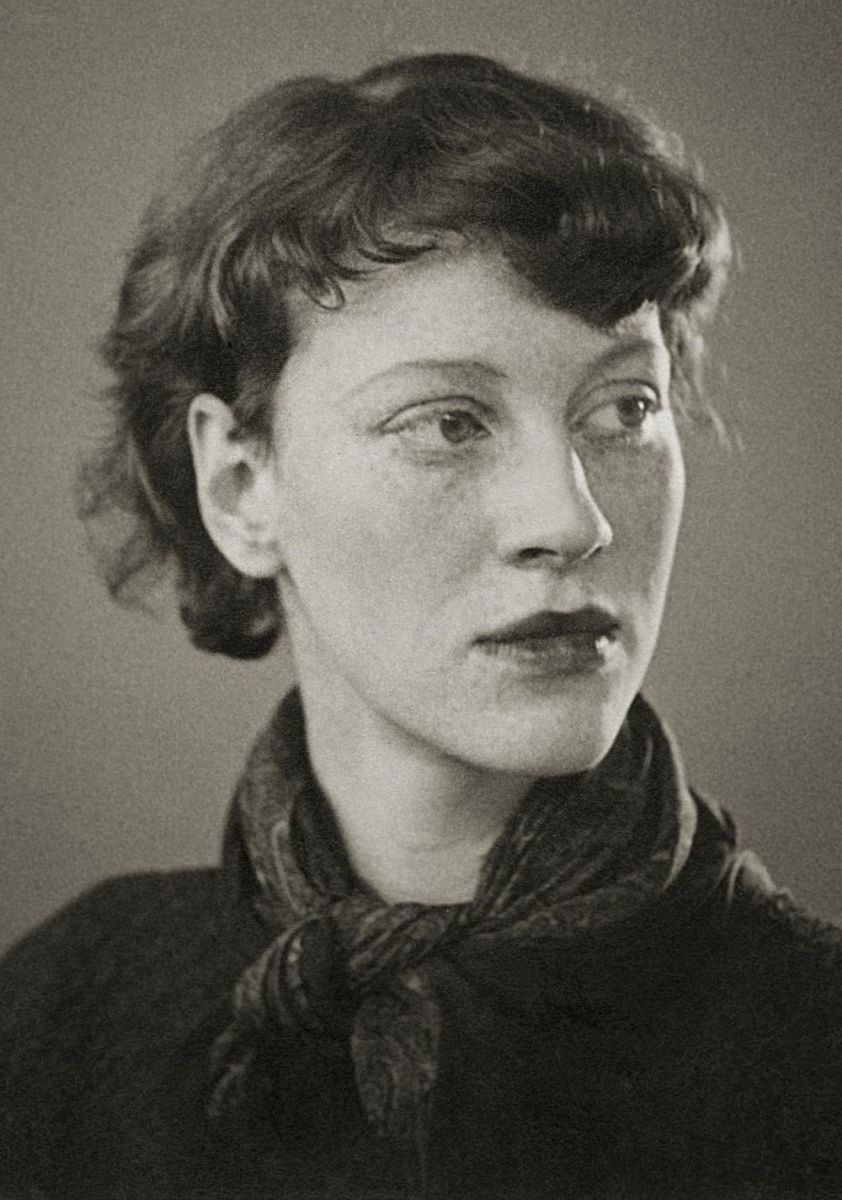
Ingrid Vang Nyman.

=== January–March ===
- 28 February – Svend Asmussen, jazz violinist (died 2017)
- 21 March – Freddy Koch, actor (died 1980)

=== April–June ===
- 27 April – Johannes Sløk, philosopher and writer (died 2001)
- 7 May – Orla Møller, priest and politician (died 1979)
- 8 May – Jens Risom, furniture designer (died 2016 in the United States)
- 15 May – Vera Gebuhr, actress (died 2014)
- 30 May – Karen Lachmann, fencer (died 1962)
- 14 June – Philip Arctander, architect (died 1994)

=== July–September ===
- 7 August – Mogens Andersen, artist (died 2003)
- 14 August – Grethe Philip, politician (died 2016)
- 18 August – Aksel Bender Madsen, furniture designer (died 2000)
- 21 August – Ingrid Vang Nyman, illustrator (died 1959)
- 29 September – Anne Marie Lütken, painter (died 2001)
- 29 September – Rolf Graae, architect (died 1996)

== Deaths ==
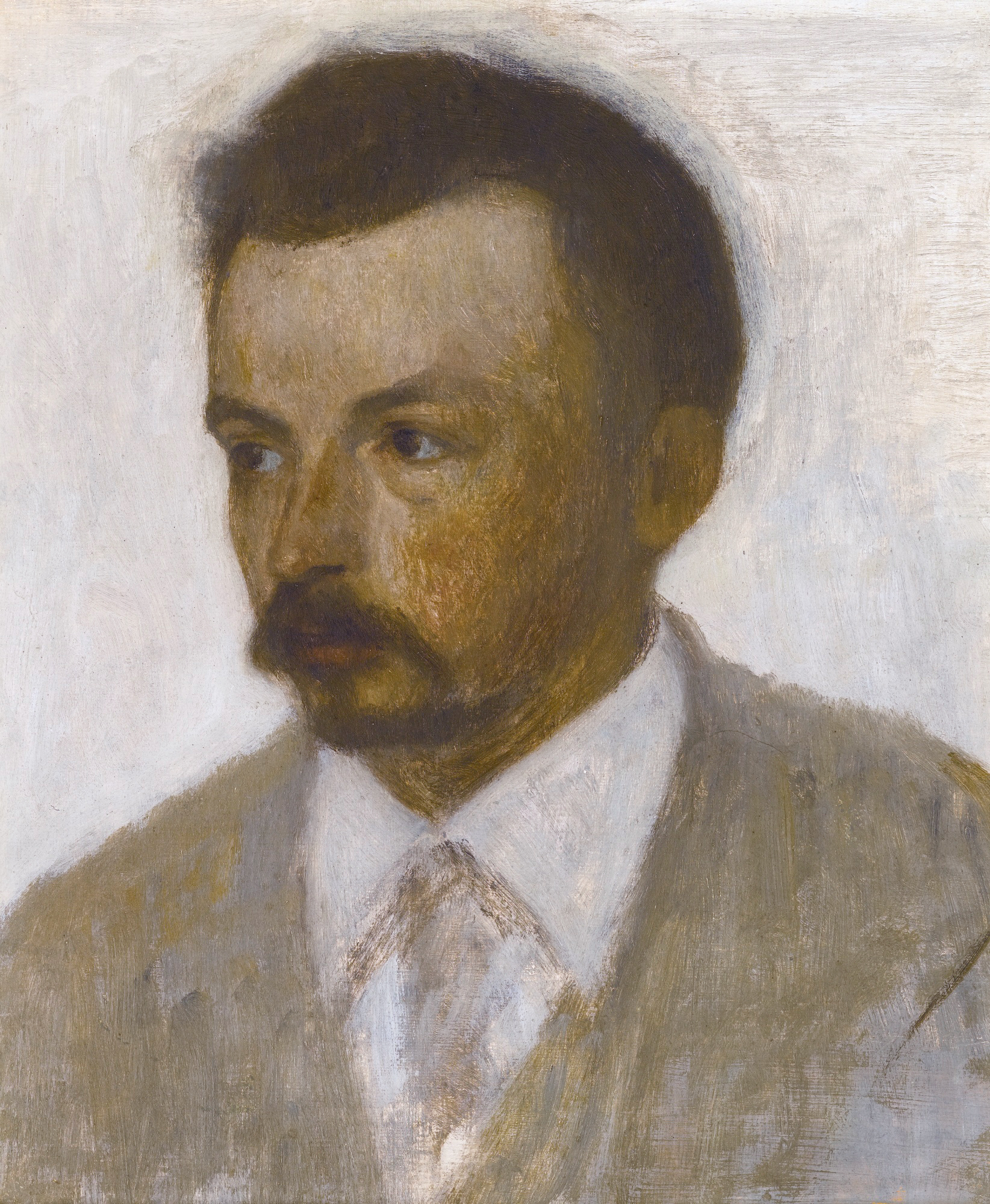
Vilhelm Hammershøi.

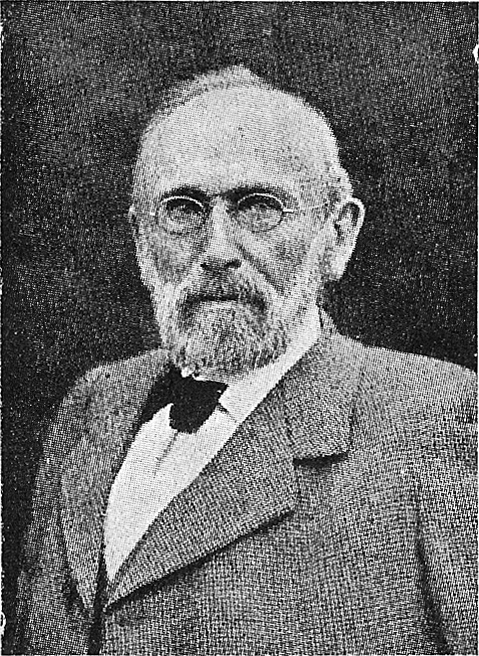
Gustav Adolph Hagemann,

=== January–March ===
- 13 February – Vilhelm Hammershøi, painter (born 1864)

=== April–June ===
- 11 April – Harald Hirschsprung, businessman (born 1830)
- 26 April – Gustav Adolph Hagemann, engineer and businessman (born 1842)
- 19 April – Frederik Bergmann Larsen, physician (born 1839)
- 29 April – Jørgen Pedersen Gram, aqtuary and mathematician (born 1850)
- 22 May – Sara Ulrik, flower painter (born 1855)
- 20 June – Christian Ditlev Ammentorp Hansen, pharmacist and industrialist (born 1843)

=== Kily–September ===
- 22 July – Hans Jørgen Holm, architect (born 1835)
- 4 September – Otto Mønsted, businessman (died 1838)
- 10 September – Carl Thorvald Andersen, architect (born 1835)

=== October–December ===
- 8 October – Nielsine Nielsen, businesswoman (born 1850)
- 12 November – August Saabye, sculptor (born 1823)
- 26 November – Nielsine Petersen, sculptor (born 1853)
