= 2001 in Denmark =

- Decades: 1980s; 1990s; 2000s; 2010s; 2020s
- See also: Other events of 2001; List of years in Denmark

Events from the year 2001 in Denmark.

== Incumbents ==
- Monarch – Margrethe II
- Prime minister – Poul Nyrup Rasmussen (until November 27), Anders Fogh Rasmussen

== Events ==
- 15 May – Copenhagen Malmö Port as a trans-national port authority in the Øresund Region is established, the official opening ceremony is held on 15 May.

== The arts ==
=== Film ===
- February – Lone Scherfig's film Italian for Beginners receives a Silver Bear in the Jury Prize category at the 2001 International Film Festival.

=== Music ===
- 1 April — The Hope by Frederik Magle is premiered, commemorating the Battle of Copenhagen, on the eve of the 200th anniversary of the battle.

== Sports ==
=== Badminton ===
- 3–10 June – Denmark wins one silver medal and two bronze medals at the 2001 IBF World Championships.
- Date unknown – Hvidovre BK wins Europe Cup.

=== Football ===
- 24 May – Silkeborg IF wins the 2000–01 Danish Cup by defeating AB 4–1 in the final.

=== Other ===
- 6 February — Jakob Piil wins Grand Prix d'Ouverture La Marseillaise.
- 4 March — Thomas Bjørn wins Dubai Desert Classic on the 2001 European Tour.
- 17 June — Tom Kristensen wins the 2001 24 Hours of Le Mans as part of the Audi team, his third win of the 24 Hours of Le Mans race.

== Births ==
- 15 January – Mathias Ross, footballer
- 25 February – Mads Bidstrup, footballer
- 7 April
  - Ahmed Daghim, footballer
  - Morten Frendrup, footballer
- 19 April – Gustav Isaksen, footballer
- 18 June – Nikolas Dyhr, footballer
- 16 November – Oliver Villadsen, footballer

== Deaths ==
- 24 January – Leif Thybo, composer (born 1922)
- 8 April – Marguerite Viby, actress (born 1909)
- 21 April – Ulla Poulsen Skou, ballerina and actress (born 1905)
- 30 June – Johannes Sløk, philosopher and writer (born 1916)
- 16 December – Villy Sørensen, philosopher and writer (born 1929)

== See also ==
- 2001 in Danish television
