= Blommenslyst =

- Town
- Location in the Region of Southern Denmark
- Coordinates: 55°23′25″N 10°15′54″E
- Country: Denmark
- Region: Southern Denmark
- Municipality: Odense Municipality

Population (2026)
  - Total: 542
- Time zone: UTC+1 (CET)
  - Summer (DST): UTC+2 (CEST)

Blommenslyst is a village, situated west of Odense, in Funen, Denmark. As of 1. January 2026, it had a population of 542 (incl. Ubberud). It contains the Blommenslyst Golf Club.
