= Anderup =

- Village
- Location in the Region of Southern Denmark
- Coordinates: 55°26′13″N 10°22′42″E
- Country: Denmark
- Region: Southern Denmark
- Municipality: Odense Municipality
- Time zone: UTC+1 (CET)
  - Summer (DST): UTC+2 (CEST)

Anderup is a village and northern suburb of Odense, Funen, Denmark.
