= Villestofte =

- Village
- Location in the Region of Southern Denmark
- Coordinates: 55°25′0″N 10°18′12″E
- Country: Denmark
- Region: Southern Denmark
- Municipality: Odense Municipality
- Time zone: UTC+1 (CET)
  - Summer (DST): UTC+2 (CEST)

Villestofte is a village and western suburb of Odense, in Funen, Denmark. It lies immediately to the southeast of Korup.
