= Åløkke =

- Neighbourhood
- Location in the Region of Southern Denmark
- Coordinates: 55°24′26″N 10°21′41″E
- Country: Denmark
- Region: Southern Denmark
- Municipality: Odense Municipality
- Time zone: UTC+1 (CET)
  - Summer (DST): UTC+2 (CEST)

Åløkke is a central-western neighbourhood of Odense, Funen, Denmark. It contains a forested area, Åløkke Skov.
