= Åsum, Denmark =

Åsum
- Town
- Location in the Region of Southern Denmark
- Coordinates: 55°24′0″N 10°27′47″E
- Country: Denmark
- Region: Southern Denmark
- Municipality: Odense Municipality

Population (2026)
  - Total: 544
- Time zone: UTC+1 (CET)
  - Summer (DST): UTC+2 (CEST)

Åsum is a village and eastern suburb of Odense, Funen, Denmark. Aasum Church is located in the village.
