= Seden =

- Village
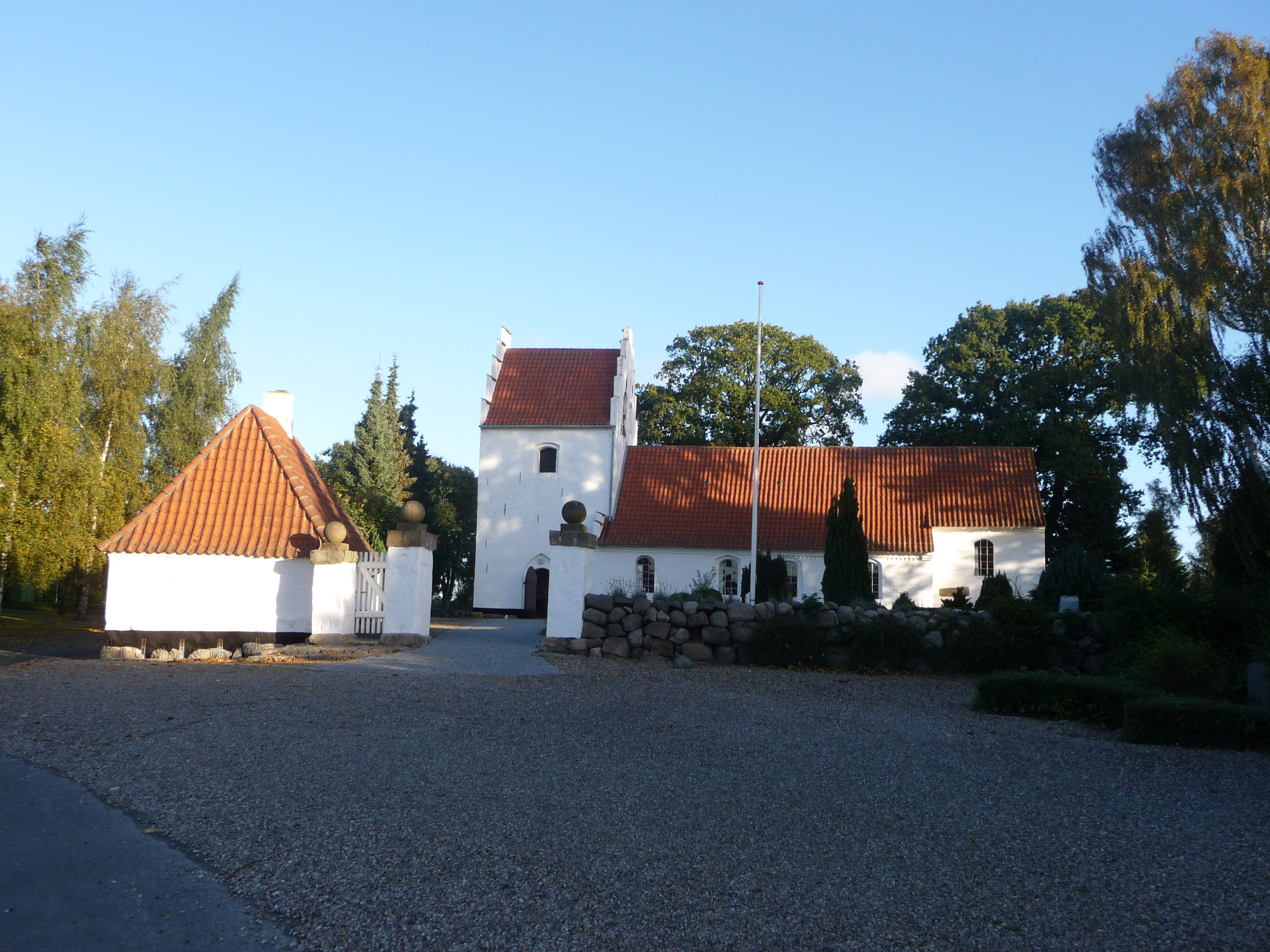
- The church

- Location in the Region of Southern Denmark
- Coordinates: 55°25′41″N 10°26′31″E
- Country: Denmark
- Region: Southern Denmark
- Municipality: Odense Municipality
- Time zone: UTC+1 (CET)
  - Summer (DST): UTC+2 (CEST)

Seden is a large village and northeastern suburb of Odense, in Funen, Denmark. The Suburb has a population of 3.743 It borders Vollsmose to the south and Stige to the north and Kerteminde to the east.
