= Stenløse, Odense =

District in Odense, Denmark

Stenløse
- District
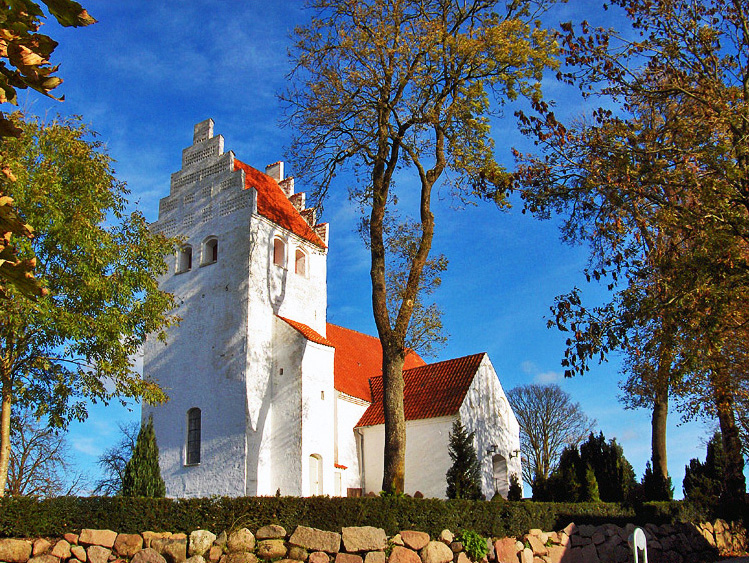
- Local church in Stenløse

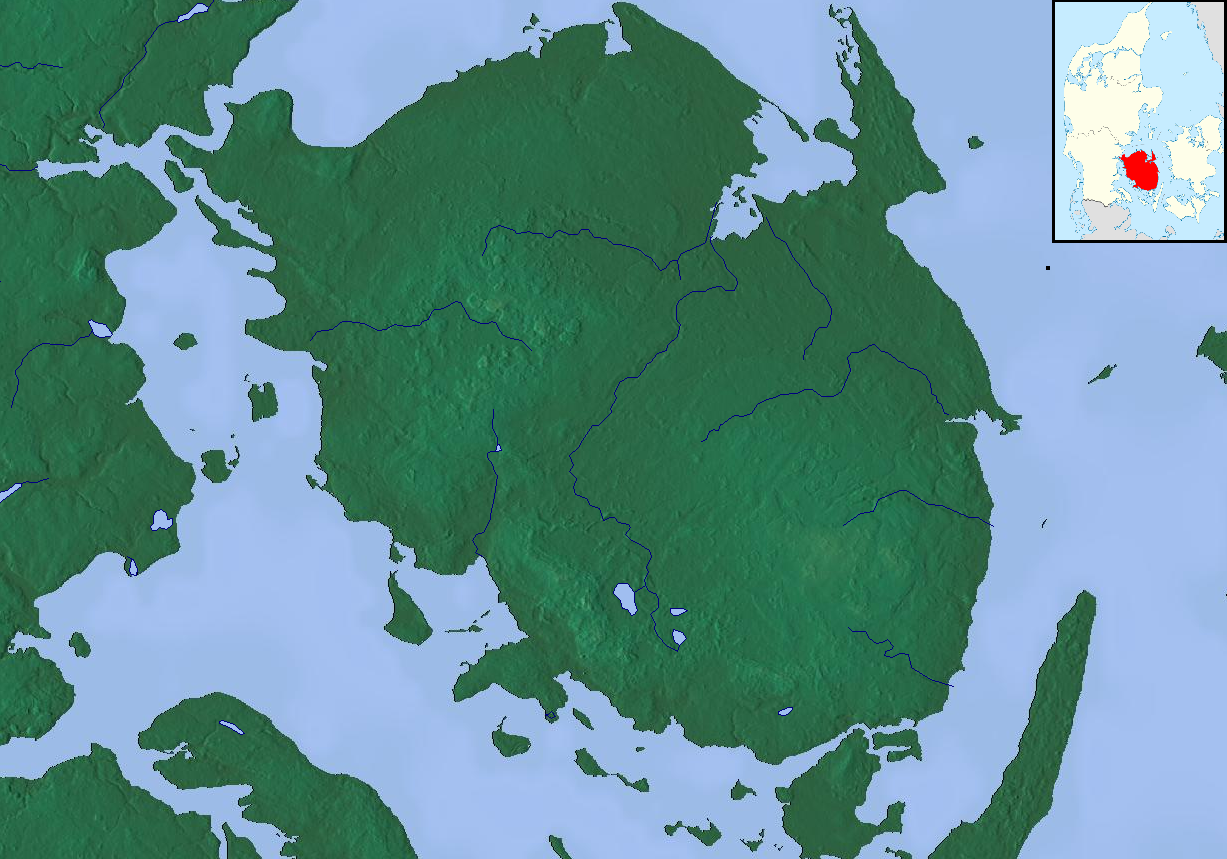
- Location within Funen Location within Denmark
- Coordinates: 55°20′21″N 10°21′42″E
- Country: Denmark
- Region: Southern Denmark
- Municipality: Odense
- Elevation: 32 m (105 ft)

Population (2022)
  - Total: 3,701
- Postal cose: 5260

Stenløse is a district in Odense, Denmark. It is located about 10 kilometers south of the urban center of Odense, at an average elevation of 32 meters above the sea level. As of the year 2022, the district had a population of 3,701.
