= Tarup =

- Suburb
- Location in the Region of Southern Denmark
- Coordinates: 55°25′16″N 10°18′54″E
- Country: Denmark
- Region: Southern Denmark
- Municipality: Odense Municipality
- Time zone: UTC+1 (CET)
  - Summer (DST): UTC+2 (CEST)

Tarup is a residential village and western suburb of Odense, in Funen, Denmark. It is located immediately to the northeast of Villestofte.
