= Wermund Bendtsen =

Danish photographer

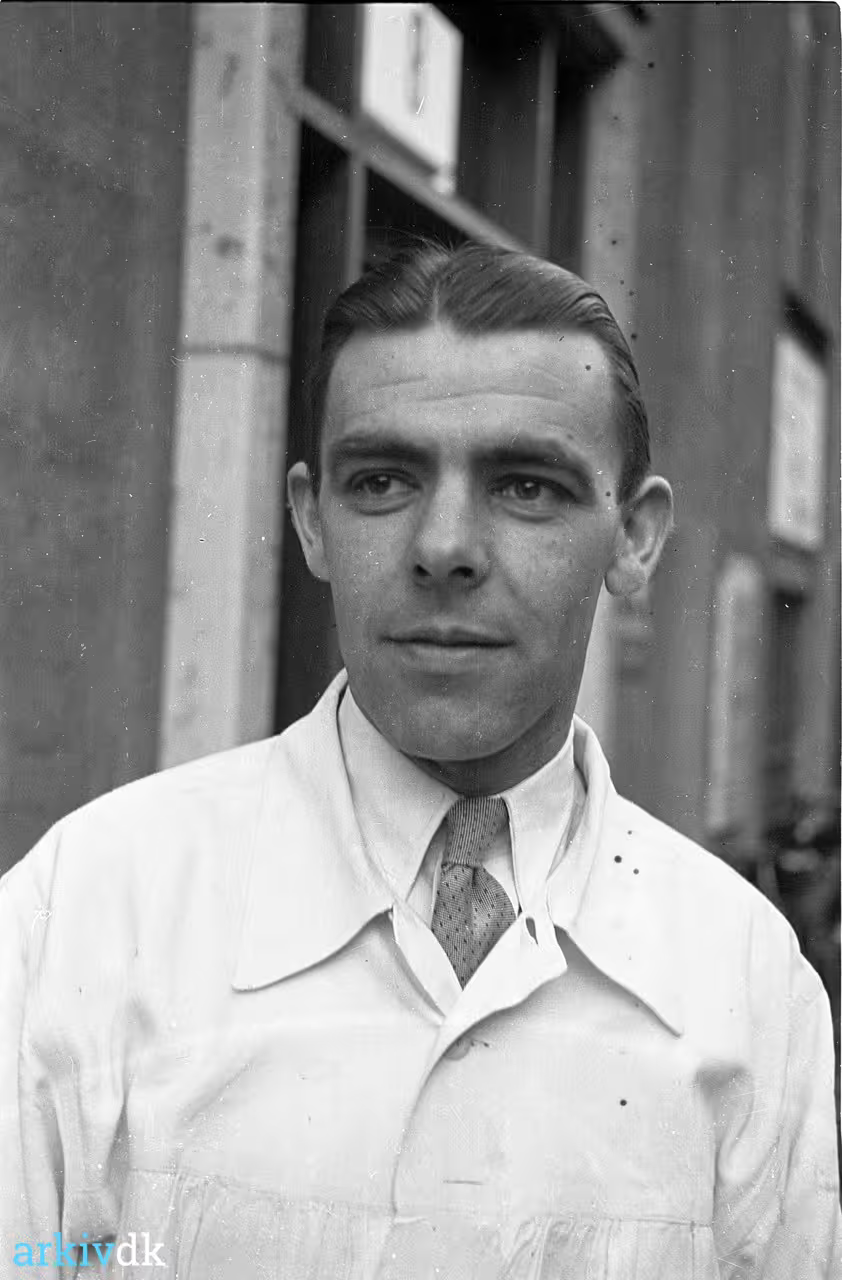
- Photographer Wermund Bendtsen in 1950
- Born: October 28, 1917; Allesø
- Died: 2003; Odense
- Education: autodidact
- Known for: photojournalism, filmmaking, commercial/industrial photography
- Notable work: Fotoinspiration og billedkomposition; Fra ø til ø i Kattegat (director of film)
- Style: Documentary
- Parents: Steffen Anton Bendtsen (father); Dagmar Cecillie Larsen (mother)

Wermund Bendtsen (28 October 1917 – 2003) was a Danish professional photographer, filmmaker, and photojournalist active in Odense from the 1940s to the 1980s.

== Biography ==
Documentation of Bendtsen's early biography and career is scant. He was the second child, born 28 October 1917 of Dagmar Cecillie Bendtsen (born Larsen, 1881) and Steffen Anton Bendtsen, pastry chef (born 7 December 1883 in Allesø, Denmark), who married in 1913 and had five children.

== Early career ==
An ink drawing from 1941 depicting an alchemist, signed by Bendtsen, indicates his artistic talent that he was applying already to a career in photography. One of his early works is an album of six black-and-white prints recording the damage to buildings from British bombings in Vestergade 41 and Bülowsvej streets in Odense in 1941 during German occupation in WWII, when it was then a town of over 100,000. Imagery from 1948 records his peacetime activities as a scout master. A 1950 newspaper photograph shows him dressed in a white darkroom smock coat.

== Cinematographer ==
In March 1953, Bendtsen was the cinematographer for the Odense film company Orion Film when it visited The Funen Village, Sejerskovvej, Odense, Denmark to make a documentary about the heritage village, an open-air museum preserved as it was in the time of Hans Christian Andersen. The director and producer were Tage Larsen and Svend Larsen, and they were advised by the Funen village architect Eigil Hansen. Bendtsen was director of photography for Orion Film's half-hour documentary Fra ø til ø i Kattegat (From Island To Island In The Kattegat) of 1955, with screenplay by Christian Seeberg.

== Recognition ==
Although Denmark in the 1950s largely lacked regard for photography as an independent art form, the Odense art gallery was hiring Bendtsen as early as 1953 for documentation of their artworks. Edward Steichen's exhibition "The Family of Man" (the Danish title translates as 'We People') challenged this attitude when it was installed at the Charlottenborg in Copenhagen in 1957. There, on its world tour from the Museum of Modern Art in New York, it had 60,000 visitors within the first few months, and the exhibition became an influential success. It included several Swedish photographers: Caroline Hebbe and her husband Hans Hammarskiöld, Lennart Nilsson, Hans Malmberg, Karl W. Gullers, Pål Nils Nilsson and Karl Sandels, but only one from Denmark; Wermund Bendtsen, while none were included from the other Nordic countries. Bendtsen's low-angle shot that Steichen selected shows a shirtless construction worker mopping his brow, and the same image, more tightly cropped, appears on the 1979 vinyl LP cover for Vi Længes Sikkert Mod Noget Andet ('We are longing for something else') by Bertolt Brecht, Lars Forsell, Harald Herdal, Rudolf Nilsen.

Bendtsen was conducting popular photo-tours of Funen Village in the mid-50s, and in 1957, as an indication of his standing, was able to successfully release a book that promoted art photography, entitled, in English translation, Photo Inspiration and Image Composition, to which he added several picture books published after 1960 on Scandinavian landscape and travel and on museum collections. He undertook research on the lineage of Hans Christian Andersen for Denmark's Grafiske Museum.

== Professional photographer ==
In February 1964, Bendtsen moved into a new studio near the town centre at 10 Adel Street (Adelgade 10, running through to Overgade 19), once a charity-run infants' school that surrounds a large courtyard. The Funen Stiftstidendes (the 'Funen Herald-Tribune') newspaper photographed him at the launch of the new premises accompanied by theatre photographer Gunnar Graham (1915–2004) and, as an indication of Bendtsen's clientele of the period, they are joined by author, historian and Odense Museum Director Niels Oxenvad (1928–2014), Apollo Theatre director Tage Larsen (who was also founder of Orion Films in 1947) and Ethel Johansen, director of Ethel Johansen Advertising in nearby Nørregade.

In the 1960s, Bendtsen's studio produced a broad range of imagery including advertising photographs for Danish companies, including Star refrigerators in Marslev and Wittenborg Machine Factory, manufacturer of automats. For the Odense City council, he produced architectural photography of interiors of newly constructed municipal offices, records of land reclamation and town and street scenes for publicity. Other clients included the tourist organisation, the art gallery, and theatre, and his pictures also appeared in the newspapers of the region.

Bendtsen was still photographing into his seventies, until 1997 when he passed his business on to colleagues, whereupon Wermund Bendtsen Photography ApS was founded on Thursday 11 December 1997 at Stenhuggervej 18 5230 Odense M, moving 3 years later to Østerbro 18, Odense, but ceasing its activity seven years later on 1 February 2005, during an industry-wide shift to digital imaging. During this latter period his name appears in credits for specialist reprography of artworks in significant art publications for museums including the Johannes Larsen Museet. He died in 2003.

== Publications ==
- Bendtsen, W. (1957). Fotoinspiration og billedkomposition. Skandivanisk bogforlag.
- Ørnholt, Hjalmar, author & Bendtsen, Wermund, photog. (1959) Det Sydfynske Øhav ('Hærvejen'). First edition. P. Haase & Son Publishers, København
- Hjalmar Ørnholt, Wermund Bendtsen (1959) Langs Hærvejen: der dänische Heerweg, P. Haase & Søns Forlag, København
- Paulsen, I.B., author & Bendtsen, W., photog. (1960) Det Sydfynske Øhav ('The Archipelago'). Text in Danish, English and German. 1st ed. P. Haase & Son Publishers, København
- Bendtsen, W., & Odense City Museums. (1960).
- Paulsen, I.B., author & Bendtsen, W., photog. (1961) Jyllands Vestkyst ('Jutland's West Coast'), 1st ed. P Haase & Son Publishers, København
- Bendtsen, W. (1962). Odense County and City Hospital.
- Bendtsen, W., & Pedersen, EM (1963). The young bar: 78 recipes for non-alcoholic drinks, snacks, desserts, etc.. Copenhagen.
- Bendtsen, W., & Kjersgaard, E. (1963). Fra Dannevirke til Dybbøl. København: Haase.
- Bendtsen, W., Saabye, S., & Odense's museums. (1968). Odense's museums.
- Andersen, I., Norbøll, K. W., Mikkelsen, K., & Bendtsen, W. (1969). Fysik og kemi for 1. og 2. realklasse: Tegn. Kbh: P. Haase & Søn.
- Bendtsen, W., & Saabye, S. (1970). Odense City Museums. Odense.
- Danmarks Grafiske Museum: Wermund Bendtsen. (1990). Odense: s.n..

== Collections ==
Wermund Bendtsen's work is in the collections of:

- Museum Folkwang, Museumsplatz 1, 45128 Essen
- Clerveaux Castle, Luxembourg
- Sterling Memorial Library, Yale University Library
