= Stige =

- Village
- Location in the Region of Southern Denmark
- Coordinates: 55°26′21″N 10°24′37″E
- Country: Denmark
- Region: Southern Denmark
- Municipality: Odense Municipality
- Time zone: UTC+1 (CET)
  - Summer (DST): UTC+2 (CEST)

Stige is a large village and northern suburb of Odense, in Funen, Denmark. It lies on the northern side of the Odense Canal from Odense and is primarily residential.

== History ==
Parts of Stige were established as early as the 14th century. Hauge, a historic village which is today within Stige, dates back to at least 1397.
