= Port of Odense =

Coordinates: 55.409°N 10.380°E

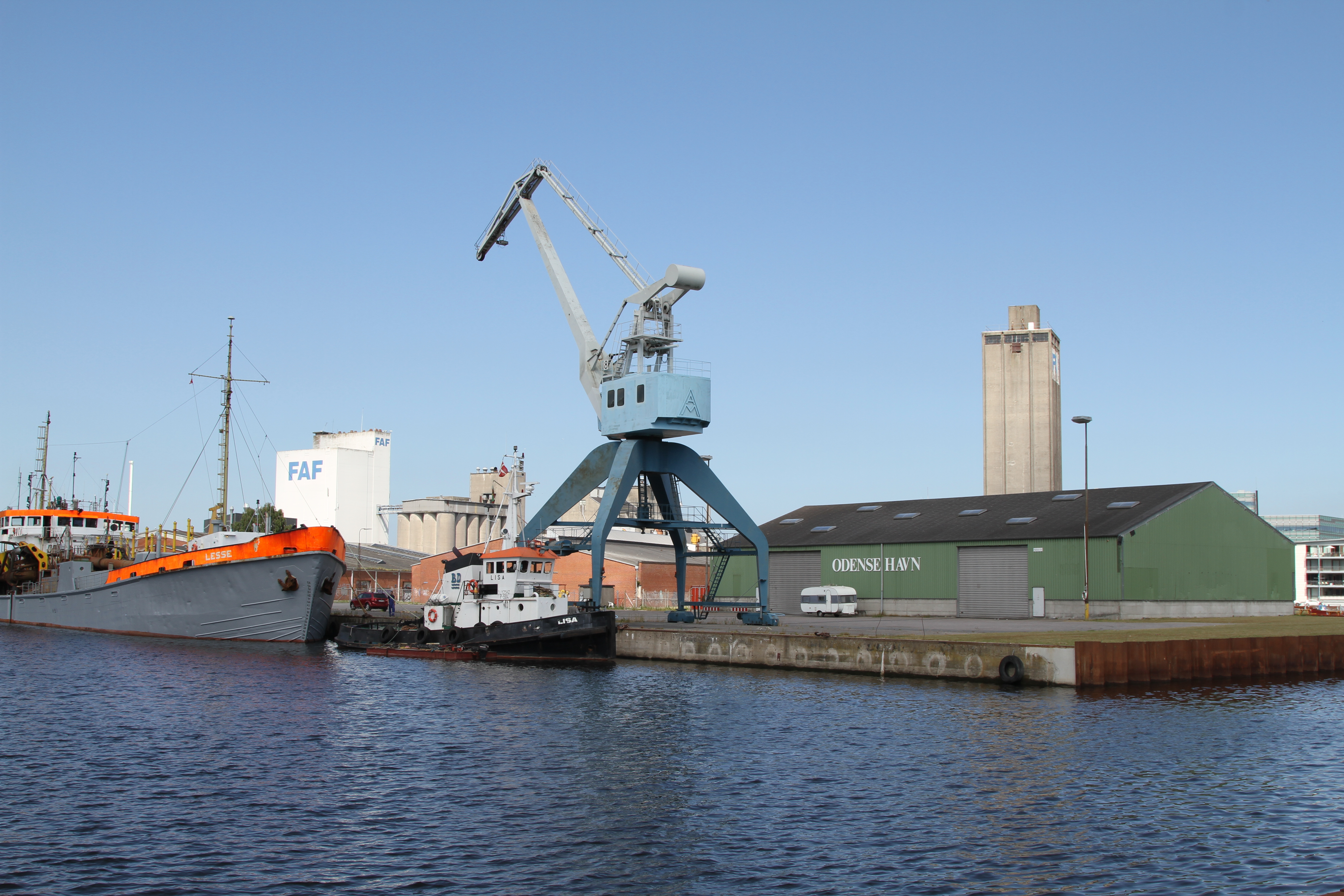
Industry in Odense Inner Harbour

Odense Harbour ("Odense Havn") is the port of Odense, Denmark. Founded in 1803 (222 years ago), Denmark's only canal harbour is the country's seventh largest commercial port in terms of turnover. It consists primarily of Inner Harbour, at the end of Odense Canal, and Odense Steel Terminal of Munkebo, which is located adjacent to the Odense Steel Shipyard. The port has a land area of approximately 4,000,000 square metres (43,000,000 sq ft) and a water area of almost 1,000,000 square metres (11,000,000 sq ft). Its industrial importance has declined since the 1960s, but a transformation is underway, including new residential and small business areas.

In 2012, Port of Odense purchased the site of the former Odense Steel Shipyard which had been Denmark's second-largest shipbuilding facility. Lindø Industrial Park is now being developed on the site with an emphasis on companies working in the off-shore sector.

== History ==
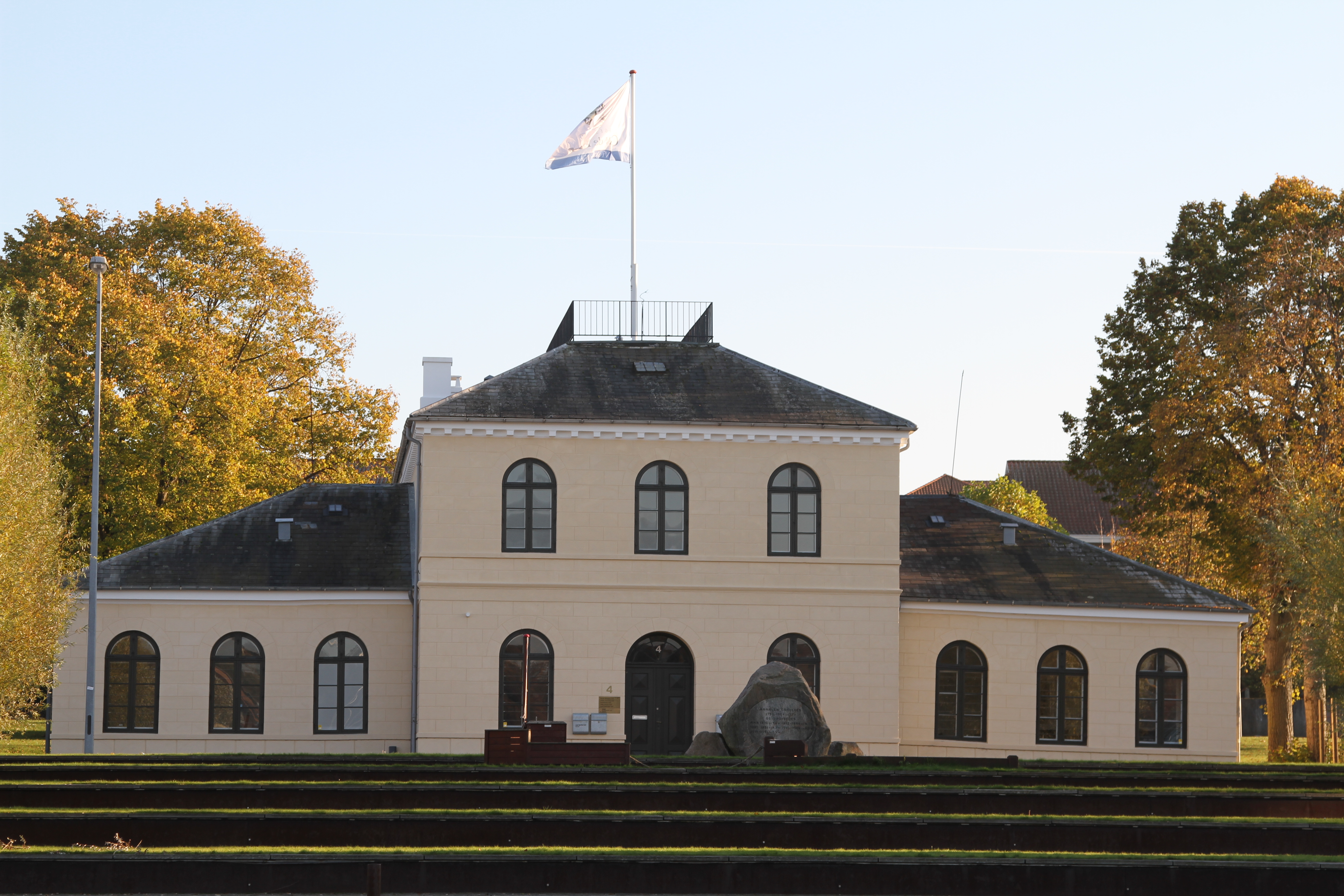
The old port customs house, built in 1833, is at the end of the original docks constructed from 1803. The building's present appearance dates to 1848.

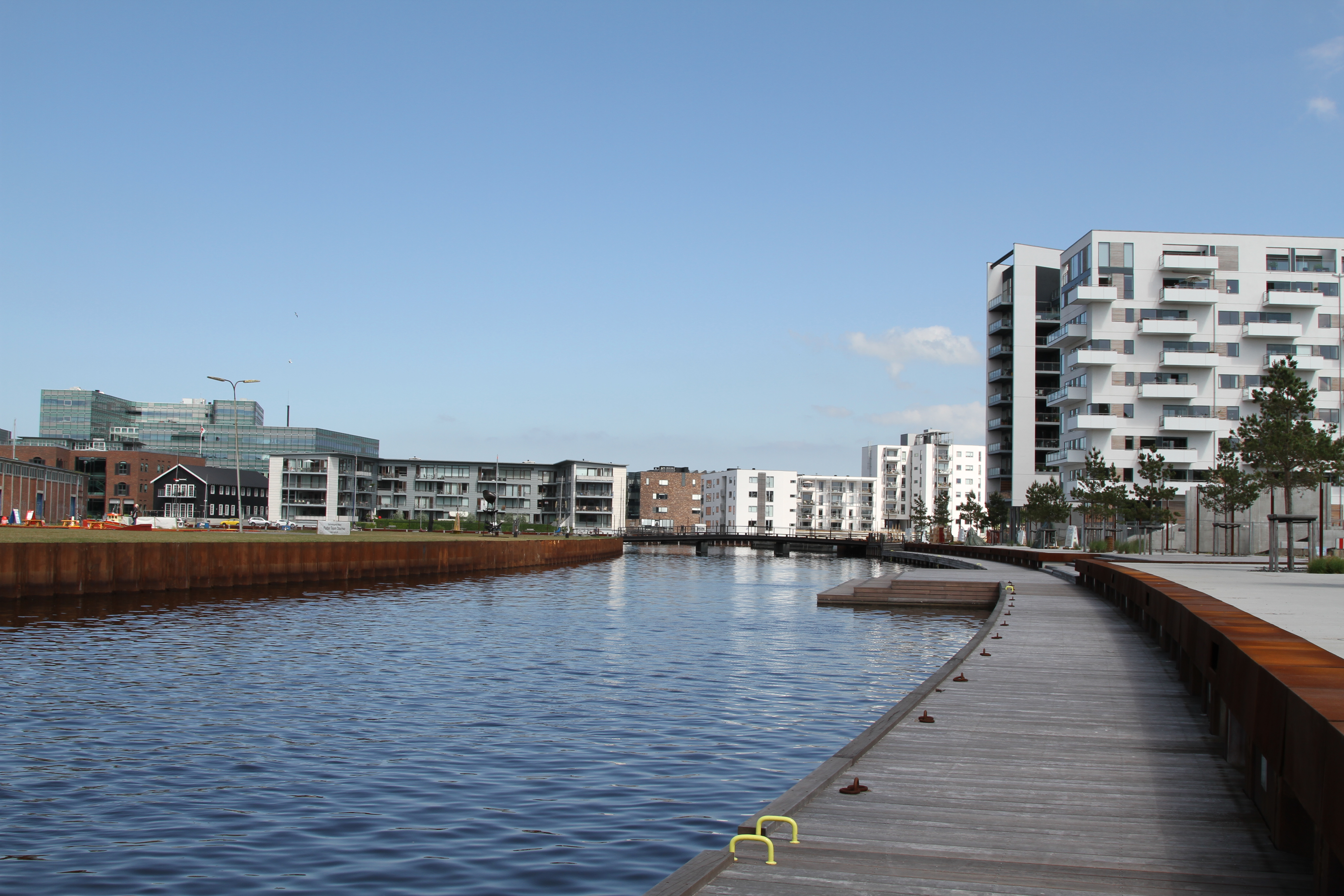
Residential buildings in Odense Inner Harbour

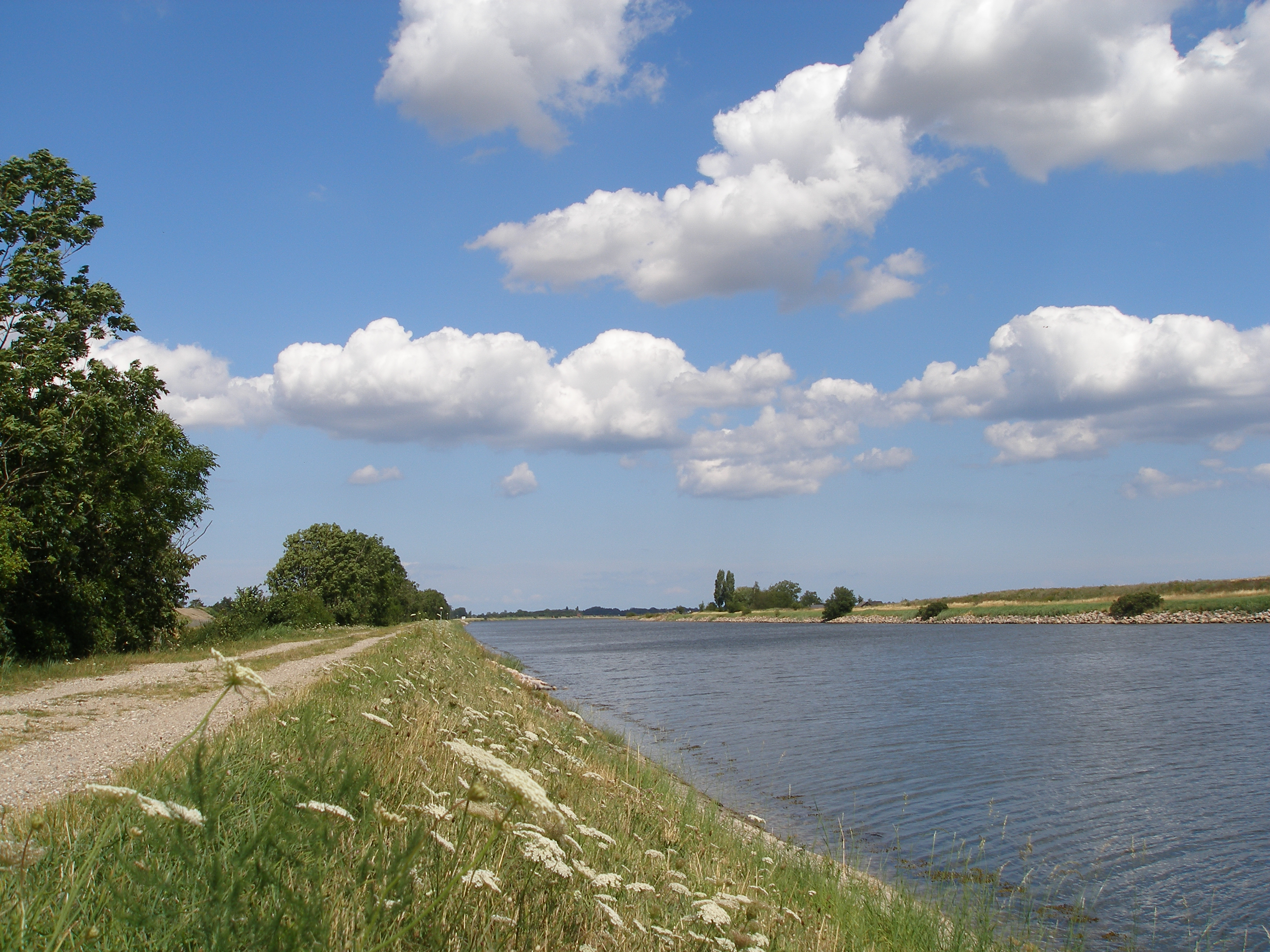
Odense Canal

Odense's inland location became an ever more serious problem for the city with the development of industry and commerce in the 18th century. Towards the end of the century, the prefect Friedrich Buchwald (1747–1814) suggested connecting it to the sea by means of a canal. A huge undertaking at the time, it took some 200 workers eight years to complete the 5 km (3 mi) of excavation work, largely using spades and barrows. The canal was completed in October 1807 when the yacht Neptunus was able to sail into the new harbour. By 1805, up to 12 vessels could be seen in the small dock.

The canal contributed to the city's growing prosperity as warehouses and customs offices were built along the quayside. But by the second half of the 19th century, with the advent of larger ships, there was need for expansion. In 1885, a new basin opened east of the old one and in 1904 the canal was deepened and widened, this time with the help of steam-driven equipment. The harbour became a major hub for the import and export of coal and was a regular destination for steamships.

Despite a serious fire in 1925, the port continued to prosper. Fine new warehouses were constructed, many of which can still be seen today. The harbour quarter of Nørrebro developed with sailors' taverns and important new industries in the electrical, milling and foodstuffs sectors and last but not least in shipbuilding with A.P Møller's Odense Stålskibsværft founded in 1918. During the German occupation of Denmark in the Second World War, shortly before work on the mine-layer Linz was completed, the ship was sabotaged by Sigurd Weber, an electrician. When the Germans attempted to have the work completed under armed guard, the workers went on strike. The revolt soon spread to other industries and towns, resulting in the termination of the Danish government's cooperation with the Germans on 29 August 1943.

The last extension to the inner harbour occurred in 1964 with a new dock to the west. Thereafter growth stagnated as larger vessels were unable to navigate the canal. As a result, in 1992 a new harbour known as the Lindø Terminal (Lindø-terminalen) was built near Munkebo. It continues to cater for most of the port's shipping today.

== Two main harbours ==
The Port of Odense comprises two main harbours, the commercial harbour (Odense Erhvervshavn) in the city area and the industrial harbour (Odense Ervervshavn) at Lindø near Munkebo to the north.

=== Commercial harbour ===
The commercial harbour has three basins or docks, stretching some 3,350 m (10,990 ft) along the quay. Odense Havn owns 2,000 m (6,600 ft) of the quayside while Odense Municipality owns the remaining 1,350 m (4,430 ft). The water generally has a depth of 7.5 m (25 ft).

=== Harbour terminal ===
The terminal in Munkebo has a depth of 11 m (36 ft) and a quay 630 m (2,070 ft) in length. In addition to extensive truck parking areas, the warehousing covers 1,100 m^{2} (12,000 sq ft) while the silo facilities cover 1,000 m^{2} (11,000 sq ft). Odense Havn is planning to extend the terminal at Odense Steel Shipyard with an additional 1,000 m (3,300 ft) of mooring quay and 500 m^{2} (5,400 sq ft) of additional storage facilities.

=== New industrial park ===
After the closure of the shipyard in 2012, the site has been transformed into an industrial park housing a large number of companies within the offshore sector; the Lindø Industrial Park (Lindø Industripark). Most companies work with production, storage and discharge of large components for offshore and heavy industries.

The area of more than 1,000,000 square metres (11,000,000 sq ft), of which 166,000 square metres (1,790,000 sq ft) is under roof, with an expansion area of an additional 2,000,000 m^{2} (22,000,000 sq ft). The old gantry crane and the harbour area makes it ideal for handling heavy industry. There is a small harbour with a depth of 7–5 m (23–16 ft) with lifting and carrying facilities able to handle up to 1,000 tonnes. LORC (Lindoe Offshore Renewables Centre), a non-profit commercial foundation in the green offshore sphere has been established, attracting a number of players involved in research and development. These include Mærsk, DONG Energy, Siemens Wind Power, University of Southern Denmark, Vattenfall Vindkraft and Vestas Wind Systems.

In December 2014 DONG Energy ordered 32 Vestas V164 wind turbines (256 MW) for the extension of the 90 MW Burbo Bank Offshore Wind Farm. The nacelles were produced at Lindø.

The 10MW LORC wind turbine test facility was expanding in 2015 at a cost of DKK 120m, and a different type of test facility for over 20MW was in construction in 2019. A 25 MW test facility was underway in 2021.
