= Lumby, Denmark =

Lumby
- Village
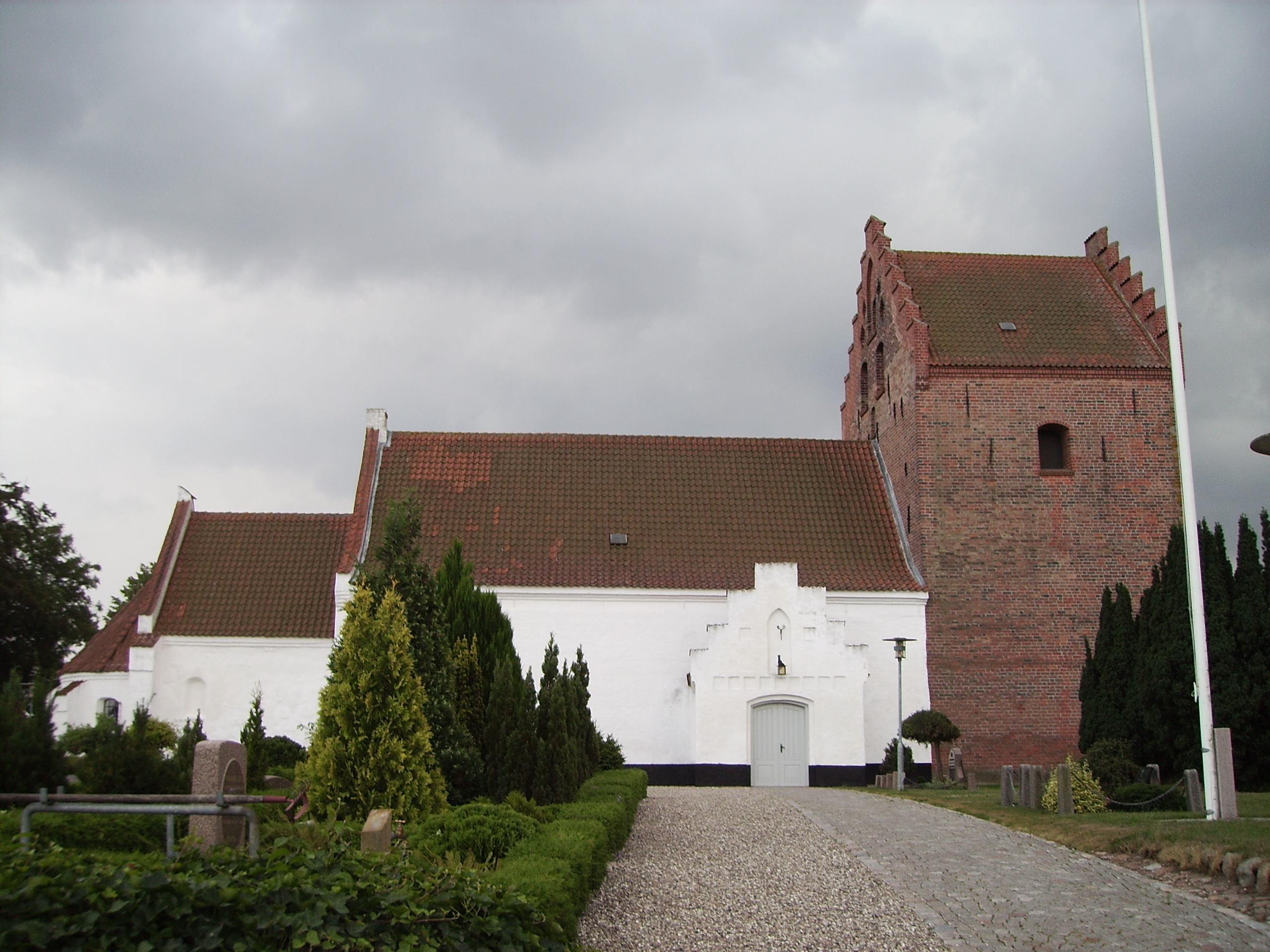
- Lumby Church

- Location in the Region of Southern Denmark
- Coordinates: 55°27′22″N 10°22′38″E
- Country: Denmark
- Region: Southern Denmark
- Municipality: Odense Municipality
- Elevation: 17 m (56 ft)

Population (2026)
  - Total: 839
- Time zone: UTC+1 (CET)
  - Summer (DST): UTC+2 (CEST)
- Postal code: 5270

Lumby is a village, with a population of 839 (1 January 2026), 8 km to the north of Odense, in Funen, Denmark.

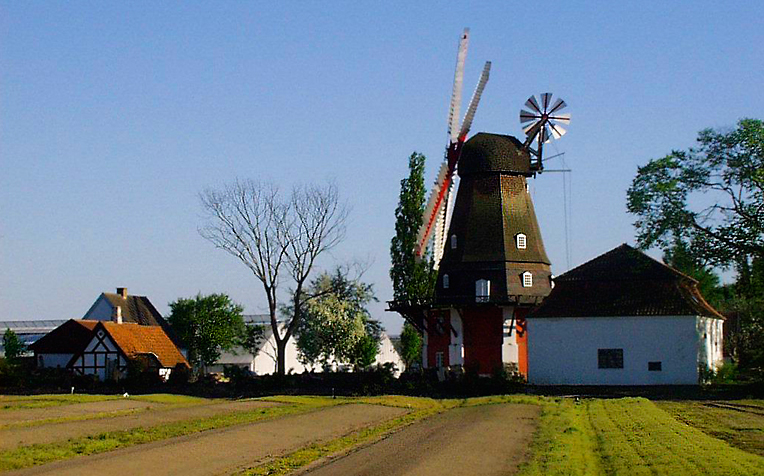
Lumby Mølle (Lumby Mill)

Lumby Mill from 1820 is located on the southern outskirts of the village.
