= Rosengård, Odense =

Rosengård
- Neighbourhood
- Location in the Region of Southern Denmark
- Coordinates: 55°23′1″N 10°26′0″E
- Country: Denmark
- Region: Southern Denmark
- Municipality: Odense Municipality
- Time zone: UTC+1 (CET)
  - Summer (DST): UTC+2 (CEST)

Rosengård is a southeastern neighbourhood of Odense, in Funen, Denmark. It contains the Rosengårdcentret buildings.
