= Allesø =

- Village
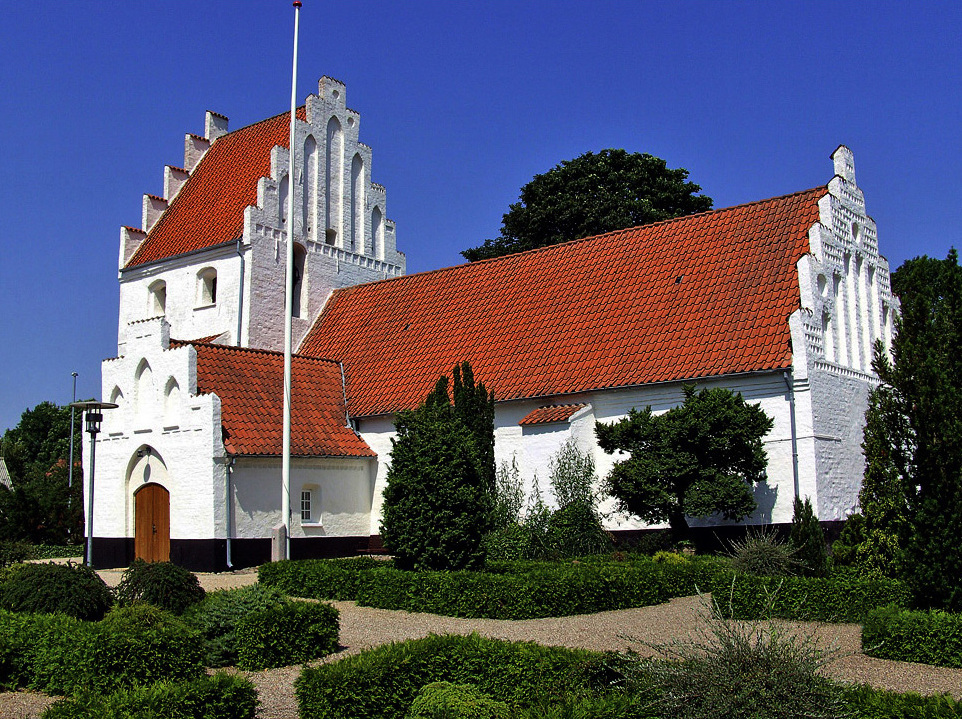
- Allesø Church

- Location in the Region of Southern Denmark
- Coordinates: 55°27′13″N 10°18′48″E
- Country: Denmark
- Region: Southern Denmark
- Municipality: Odense Municipality

Population (2026)
  - Total: 269
- Time zone: UTC+1 (CET)
  - Summer (DST): UTC+2 (CEST)

Allesø is a village and northwestern suburb of Odense, Funen, Denmark.
