= Fraugde =

- Town
- Location in the Region of Southern Denmark
- Coordinates: 55°21′18″N 10°29′18″E
- Country: Denmark
- Region: Southern Denmark
- Municipality: Odense Municipality

Area
  - Urban: 0.95 km^{2} (0.37 sq mi)

Population (2026)
  - Urban: 2,004
  - Urban density: 2,100/km^{2} (5,500/sq mi)
- Time zone: UTC+1 (CET)
  - Summer (DST): UTC+2 (CEST)

Fraugde is a village and southeastern suburb of Odense, with a population of 2,004 (1 January 2026), in Funen, Denmark.
