= Korup, Denmark =

Korup
- Village
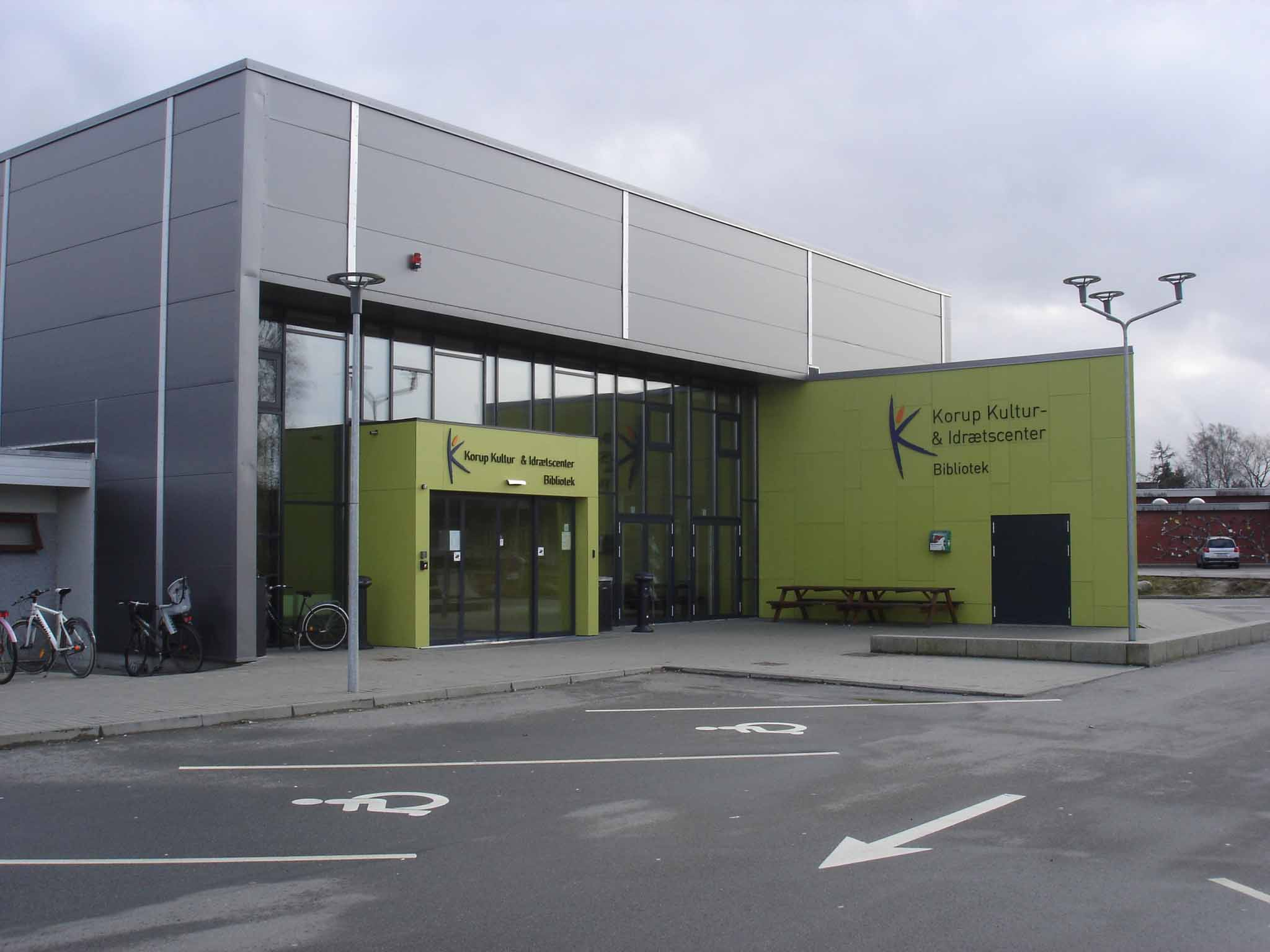
- Korup Culture & Sports Center

- Location in the Region of Southern Denmark
- Coordinates: 55°25′12″N 10°16′18″E
- Country: Denmark
- Region: Southern Denmark
- Municipality: Odense Municipality
- Time zone: UTC+1 (CET)
  - Summer (DST): UTC+2 (CEST)

Korup is a large village and northwestern suburb of Odense, in Funen, Denmark.
