= Ubberud =

Village in Funen, Denmark

- Village
- Location in the Region of Southern Denmark
- Coordinates: 55°23′49″N 10°15′21″E
- Country: Denmark
- Region: Southern Denmark
- Municipality: Odense Municipality
- Time zone: UTC+1 (CET)
  - Summer (DST): UTC+2 (CEST)

Ubberud is a village west of Odense, in Funen, Denmark. It is the birthplace of the Danish singer MØ and Danish International Football coach Richard Møller Nielsen. It is a part of Blommenslyst urban area.
