= Agedrup =

- Village
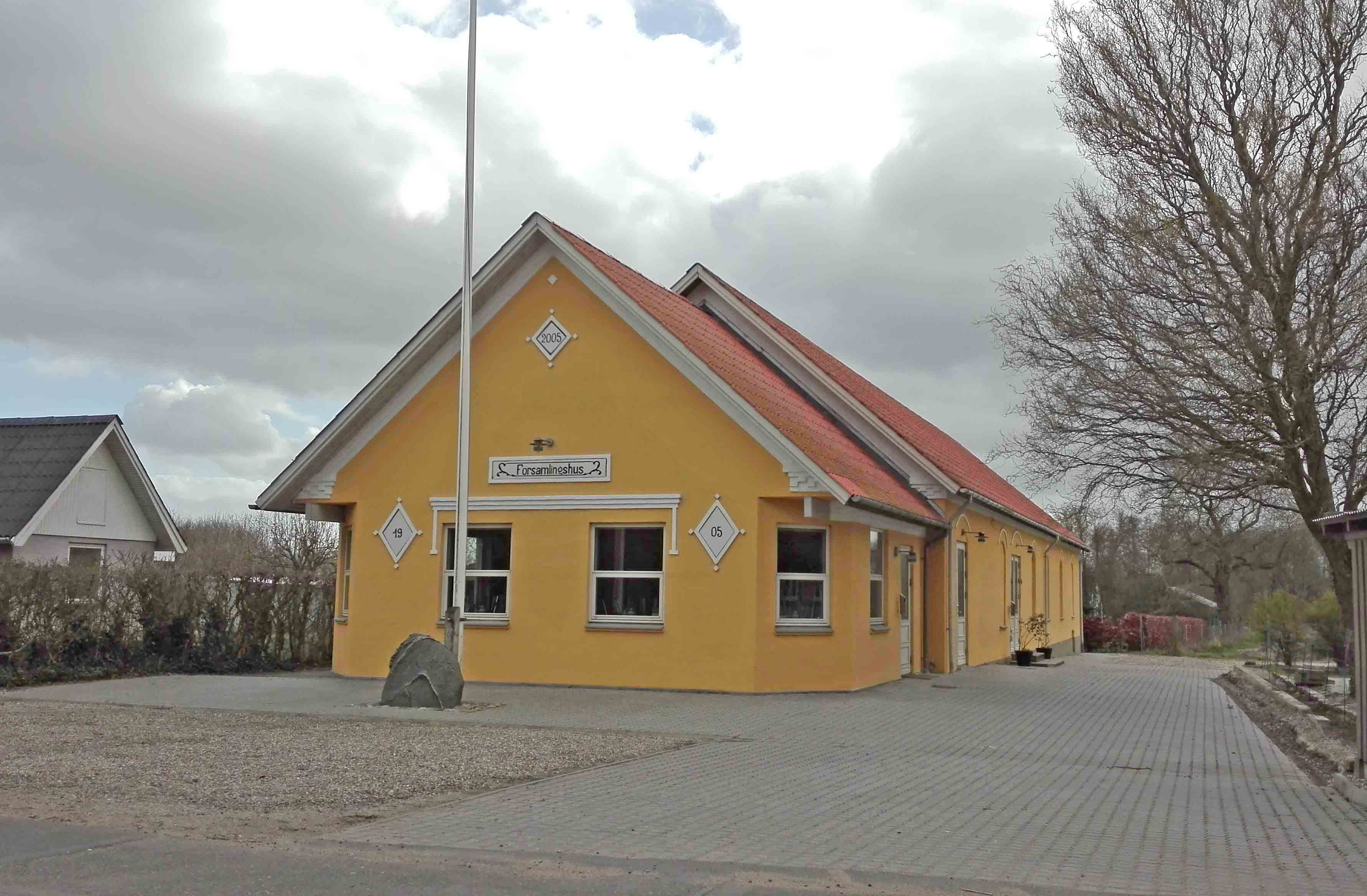
- Community centre

- Location in the Region of Southern Denmark
- Coordinates: 55°25′56″N 10°29′18″E
- Country: Denmark
- Region: Southern Denmark
- Municipality: Odense Municipality
- Time zone: UTC+1 (CET)
  - Summer (DST): UTC+2 (CEST)

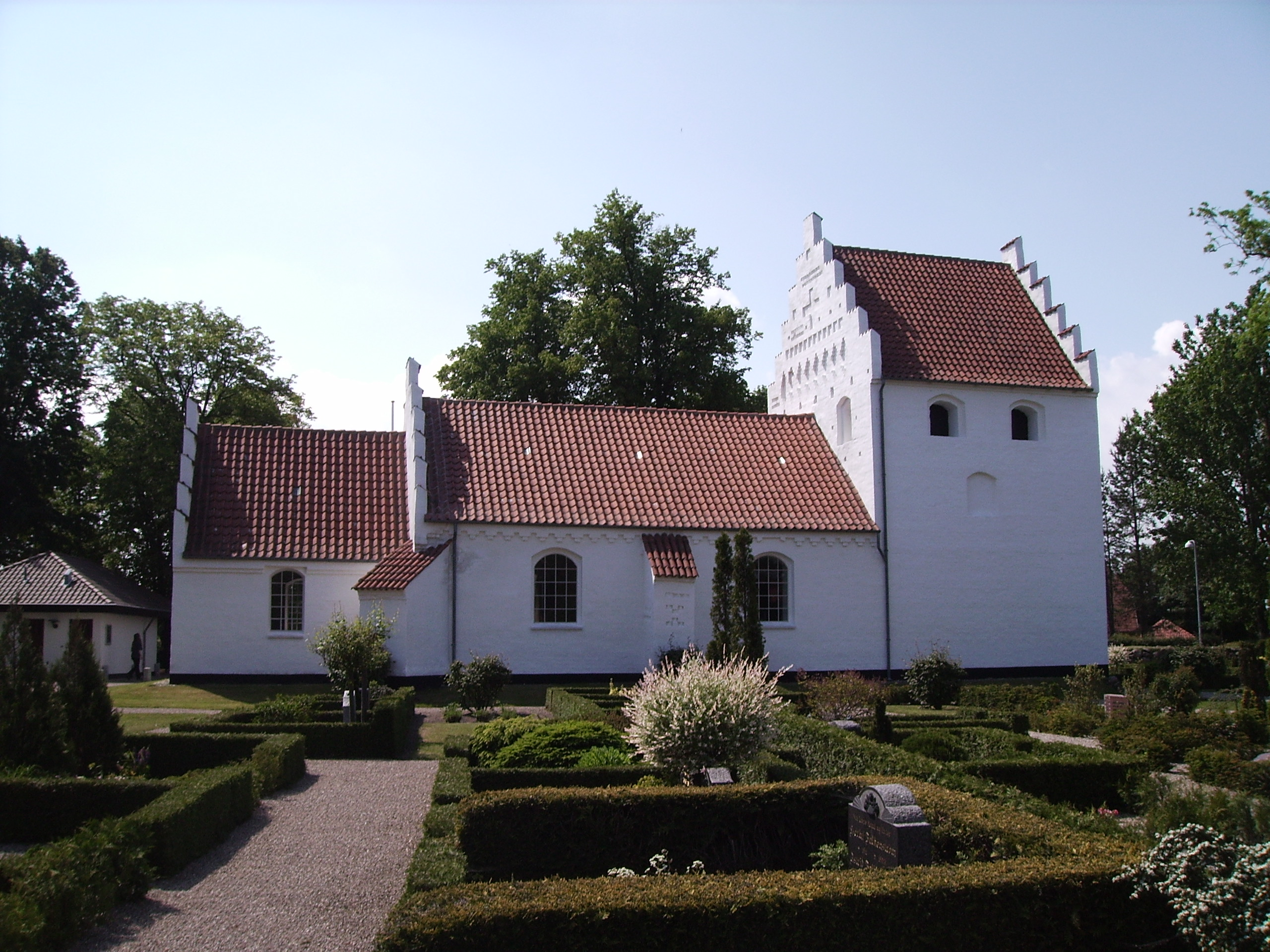
The church

Agedrup is a village and northeastern suburb of Odense, Funen, Denmark. It contains a church, Agedrup Church (Agedrup Kirke).
