= Sanderum =

- Suburb
- Location in the Region of Southern Denmark
- Coordinates: 55°22′20″N 10°20′49″E
- Country: Denmark
- Region: Southern Denmark
- Municipality: Odense Municipality
- Time zone: UTC+1 (CET)
  - Summer (DST): UTC+2 (CEST)

Sanderum is a village and southwestern suburb of Odense, in Funen, Denmark.
