= Odense Municipality =

Odense Municipality Odense Kommune (Danish)
- Municipality
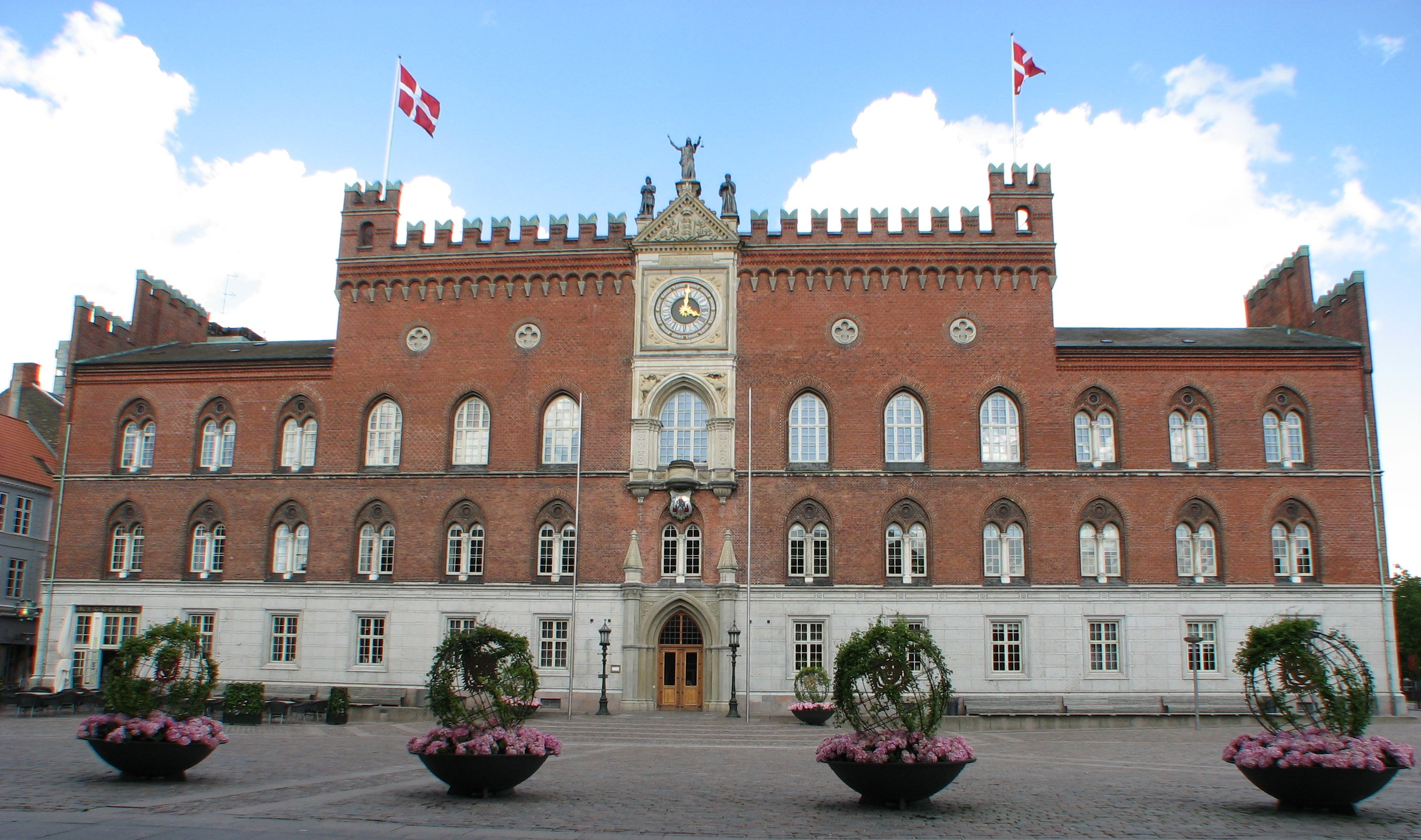
- Odense City Hall

- Coat of arms

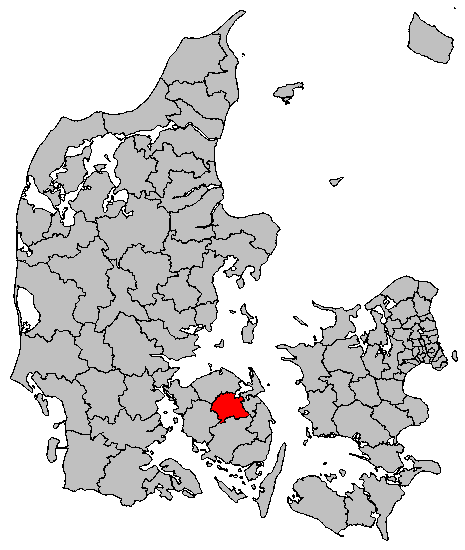
- Coordinates: 55°23′46″N 10°23′19″E
- Country: Denmark
- Region: Southern Denmark
- First documented: 988
- Chartered: 1355
- Municipalized: 1 April 1970

Government
  - Mayor: Peter Rahbæk Juel

Area
  - Total: 304.34 km^{2} (117.51 sq mi)

Population (1 January 2026)
  - Total: 213,168
  - Density: 700.43/km^{2} (1,814.1/sq mi)
- Time zone: UTC1 (CET)
  - Summer (DST): UTC2 (CEST)
- Postal code: 5000
- Website: www.odense.dk

Odense Municipality (Danish: Odense Kommune) is a Danish municipality (kommune) in Southern Denmark on the island of Funen in central Denmark. The municipality covers an area of 304.34 km^{2} (118 sq mi), and has a population of 213,168 (1 January 2026). It is the most populous municipality in the region of Southern Denmark.

The main town and the site of its municipal council is the city of Odense. Including the social sector, 17,000 people are employed by the municipality. The municipal budget is 6,881 million DKK as of 2006. The municipality runs 37 schools; Odense is also the home of 13 private schools.

Neighboring municipalities are Kerteminde to the east, Faaborg-Midtfyn to the south, Assens to the west, and Nordfyn to the north.

== Geography ==
The Odense municipality is located near the Odense Fjord. The Odense Canal (Odense Kanal) flows out from the fjord and forms three ports in the city's industrial area. The Odense River (Odense Å) also flows out from the fjord and meanders through the municipality, including Odense town center where Sankt Jørgens Park and Munke Mose are located on its banks. The river springs from Lake Arreskov (Arreskov Sø) in Faaborg-Midtfyn municipality.

The highest point in the municipality is Dyred Banke which is located at 123 m or 404 ft above sea level.

== History ==
The municipality, a former "Provincial municipality" was re-created 1 April 1970 as Odense municipality as the result of a kommunalreform ("Municipal Reform") that merged a number of existing Provincial- Parish- and Village- municipalities: Allerup-Davinde, Allese-Næsbyhoved, Broby, Brændekilde, Bellinge, Dalum, Fraugde, Korup-Ubberud, Lumby, Odense, Paarup, Sanderum, Stenløse-Fangel, the "coalition-municipality" of Fjordager (which had been created in 1966 by merging Agedrup and Seden-Åsum municipalities), and Højby parish.

Odense municipality was not merged with other municipalities by 1 January 2007 as the result of the nationwide Kommunalreformen ("The Municipal Reform" of 2007). Before this reform, the list of neighboring municipalities were Langeskov to the east, Munkebo to the northeast, Otterup to the north, Søndersø, Vissenbjerg, and Tommerup to the west, and Broby and Årslev to the south. Odense belonged to Funen County 1970-2006 and before this to Odense County.

== Politics ==
Odense's municipal council consists of 29 members, elected every four years. The municipal council has five political committees.

=== Municipal council ===
Below are the municipal councils elected since the Municipal Reform of 2007.

Election	Party								Total seats	Turnout	Elected mayor
Election	A	B	C	F	O	V	Ø	Å	Total seats	Turnout	Elected mayor
2005	10	1	11	2	1	2	2		29	69.4%	Jan Boye (C)
2009	10		7	6	2	3	1		29	65.8%	Anker Boye (A)
2013	9	1	3	2	3	8	3		29	70.5%	Anker Boye (A)
2017	13	1	3	1	2	6	2	1	29	70.0%	Peter Rahbæk Juel (A)
Data from Kmdvalg.dk 2005, 2009, 2013 and 2017

=== Mayors ===
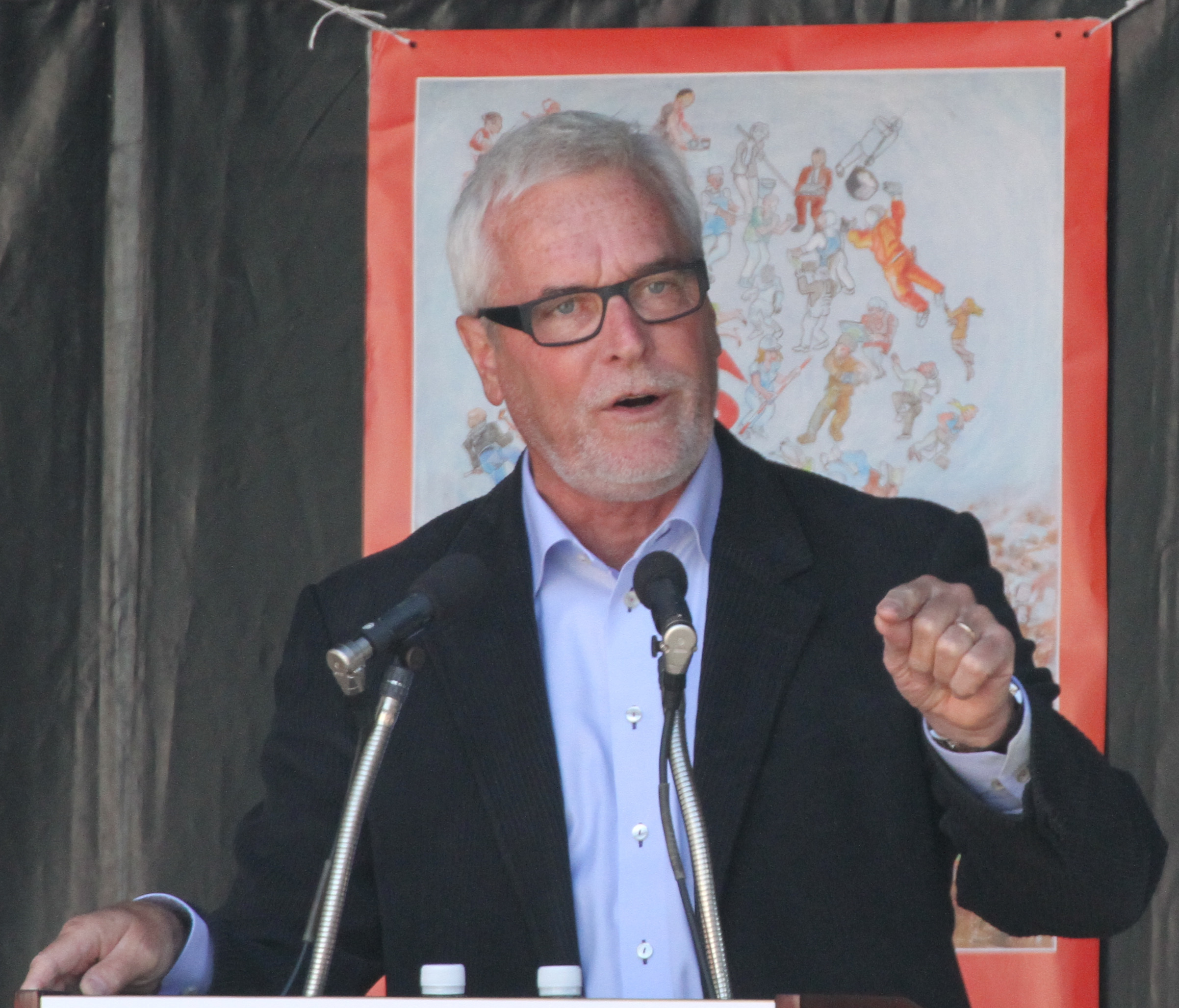
Anker Boye, former mayor

Odense's mayor is Peter Rahbæk Juel, representing the Social Democrats, since 1 January 2018.

The former mayor of Odense Municipality, Anker Boye, is a member of the Social Democratic Party. His first term was from 1993 to 2005 when he was defeated by Jan Boye, a Conservative. He was re-elected in the 2009 election, forming a coalition with the Red–Green Alliance, the Socialist People's Party and the Social Democrats.

The following is a list of mayors since 1792:

- Lauritz Martin Bendz (1792–97)
- Andreas Rosteen Lindved (1798–1816)
- Lauritz Martin Bendz (1816–24)
- Christian Reimuth (1824–46)
- Christen Estrup (1847–60)
- Louis Mourier (1861–77)
- G. Koch (1877–97)
- J.F. Simony (1897–1900)
- Ludvig Dithmer (1900–11)
- Valdemar Bloch (1911–19)
- J.L. Christensen (1919)
- A.P. Henriksen (1919–25)
- H. Chr. Petersen (1925–37)
- I. Vilh. Werner (1937–58)
- Holger Larsen (1958–73)
- Verner Dalskov (1973–93)
- Anker Boye (1994–2005)
- Jan Boye (2006–09)
- Anker Boye (2010–2017)
- Peter Rahbæk Juel (2018–)

== Neighbourhoods and settlements ==
After the city of Odense itself, the next most populous locations in the Municipality are:

Bellinge	4,900
Sankt Klemens	3,200
Fraugde	1,900
Over Holluf	1,600

Næsbyhoved-Broby	1,500
Ejlstrup	1,300
Lumby	790
Blommenslyst	530

Åsum	500
Fangel	470
Seden Strand	330
Brændekilde	318

Allesø	270
Davinde	240

The municipality of Odense is divided into 11 different sectors. Neighbourhoods, suburbs and surrounding villages of the city of Odense include:

- Agedrup
- Allesø
- Åløkke
- Anderup
- Åsum
- Blangstedgård
- Bolbro
- Bullerup
- Bellinge
- Blommenslyst
- Bregnor
- Bymidten
- Dalum
- Dyrup
- Elmeluad
- Ejlstrup
- Fraugde
- Fruens Bøge
- Hauge
- Hjallese
- Højby, Funen
- Højme
- Højstrup
- Holmstrup
- Hunderup
- Kirkendrup
- Korsløkke
- Korup
- Kragsbjerg
- Lindved
- Lumby
- Marienlund
- Munkebjerg
- Neder Holluf
- Næsby
- Paarup
- Rosengård
- Sanderum
- Seden
- Skibhusene
- Skibhuskvarteret
- Slukefter
- Snestrup
- Søhus
- Stenløse
- Stige
- Tarup
- Tornbjerg
- Ubberud
- Villestofte
- Vollsmose

=== The city of Odense ===
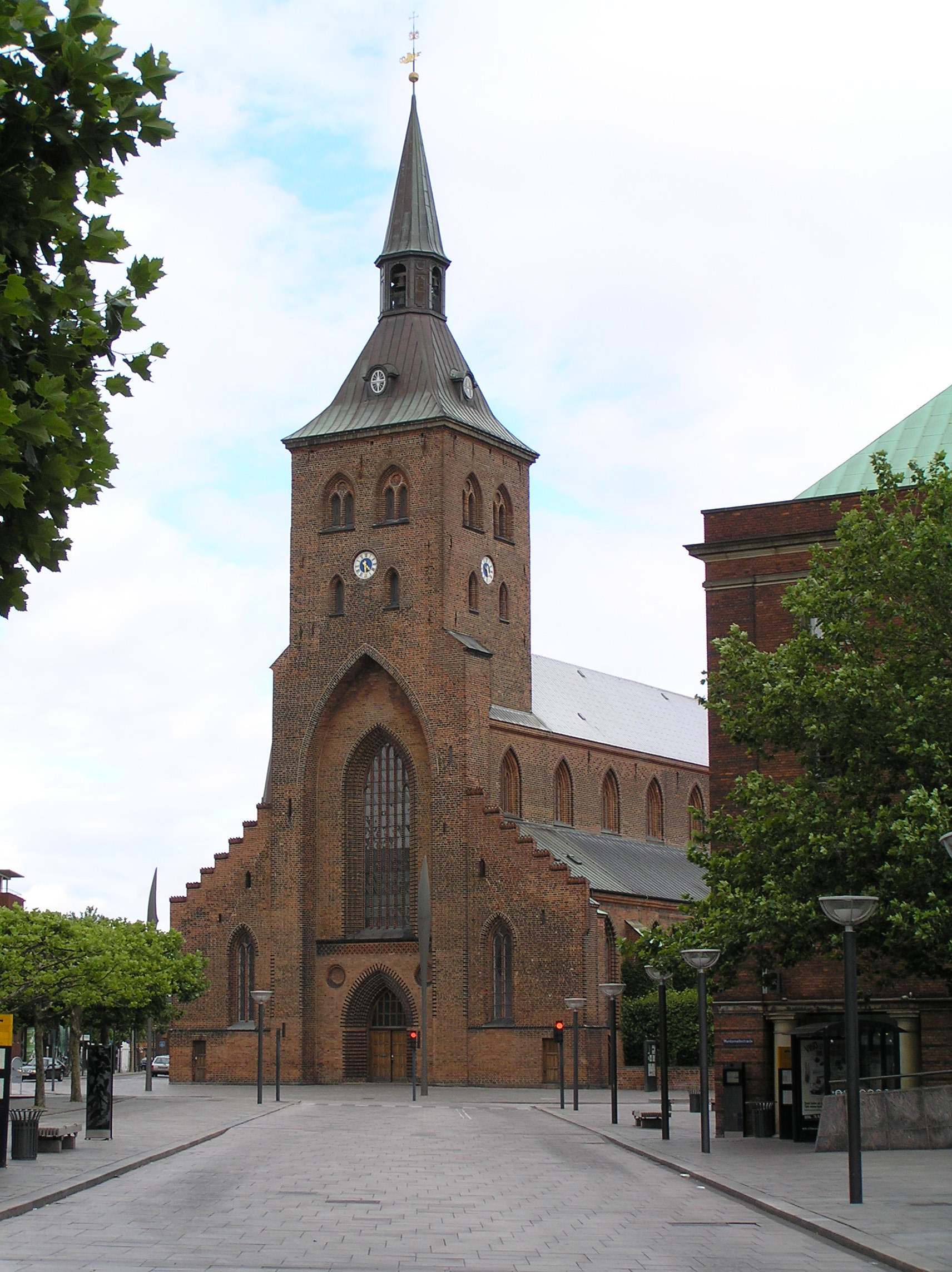
Saint Canute's Church (Sankt Knuds Kirke) in Odense, Denmark.

Odense is the third largest city in Denmark, and one of country's oldest settlements. The first record of its existence dates from 988 and the town celebrated its 1,000th anniversary in 1988. The name refers to Odin in Norse mythology— Odins Vi ("Odin's Sanctuary"). The shrine of Canute the Saint was a great resort of pilgrims throughout the Middle Ages. His relics are still preserved in Saint Canute's Cathedral. In the 16th century the town was the meeting-place of several parliaments, and down to 1805 it was the seat of the provincial assembly of Funen.

Denmark's famous author and poet Hans Christian Andersen was born in Odense on 2 April 1805. Museums honouring him have been created both in a house in the old part of Odense with a large collection of his works and belongings, and his childhood home, which is also located in the city.

Odense also has a museum honouring the classical composer Carl Nielsen, who was born in Nr. Lyndelse near Odense.

=== Tietgenbyen ===
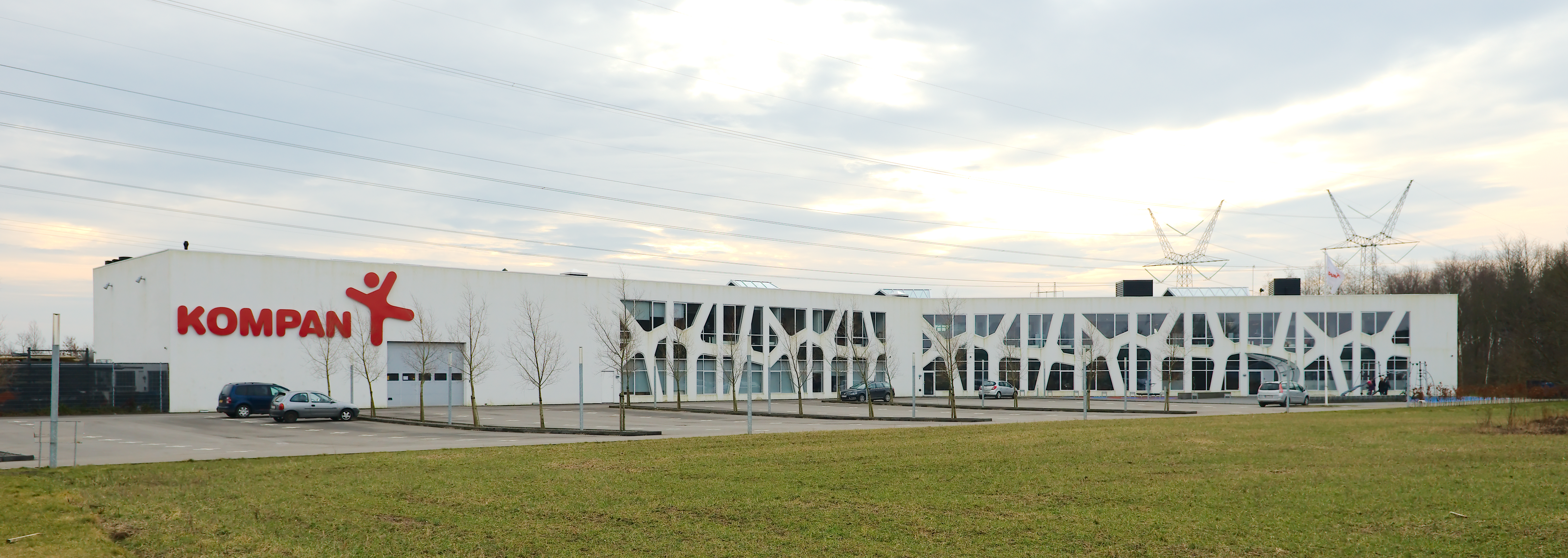
Kompan company building in Odense

Tietgenbyen is a 280-hectare (690-acre) industrial area in Denmark, southeast of Odense near European route E20. It is named after C.F. Tietgen, a businessman from Odense.

It was established in 1999 by Odense Municipality. Businesses had long advocated for an industrial area near the highway. In its early years, Tietgenbyen had difficulty attracting new companies and sold only 7 hectares (17 acres) in 1999 and 2000, but managed to reach its unofficial goal of selling at least 100 hectares (250 acres) within 12 years. In January 2017, it contained 75 companies, and most of its lots had been sold. An 118-hectare (290-acre) area north of Tietgenbyen, known as Tietgenbyen Nord, has been reserved by Odense Municipality for future expansions. The new land is privately owned, and must be bought by the municipality before it can be used industrially.

Tietgenbyen contains a data center owned by Facebook, with an area of 56,500 square meters. A district heating system is established in connection with the data center, distributing surplus heat to 7,000 houses (planned to be extended to 12,000 houses). Plans to build the data center were first revealed by Fyens Stiftstidende in October 2016, and confirmed by Facebook and Odense municipality in January 2017. The data center is Facebook's third outside the United States. It started operating in September 2019, although only partially. According to Fyens Stiftstidende, Facebook is ready to extend it with a third server building, and is considering adding two more.

A number of robotics firms are located in Tietgenbyen, including Universal Robots, Jorgensen Engineering and ABB.

Archeological excavations prior to building Tietgenbyen found a number of settlements from the bronze age.

== Transportation ==
The municipality is connected with all points on the island with an extensive system of roads, including the major E20 Funish Motorway (Fynske Motorvej) which runs across the island through the town of Odense and connect the island on the east to the island of Zealand over the Great Belt Bridge and on the west to the Danish mainland, Jutland over the Little Belt Bridge. A motorway built 2006-2009 connects Odense to the island's second-largest city, Svendborg, which also has a railroad connection (Svendborgbanen). The town of Odense is also a major stop on the national railroad system lines.

== See also ==
- List of twin towns and sister cities in Denmark
