= Odense =

City in Denmark

- City
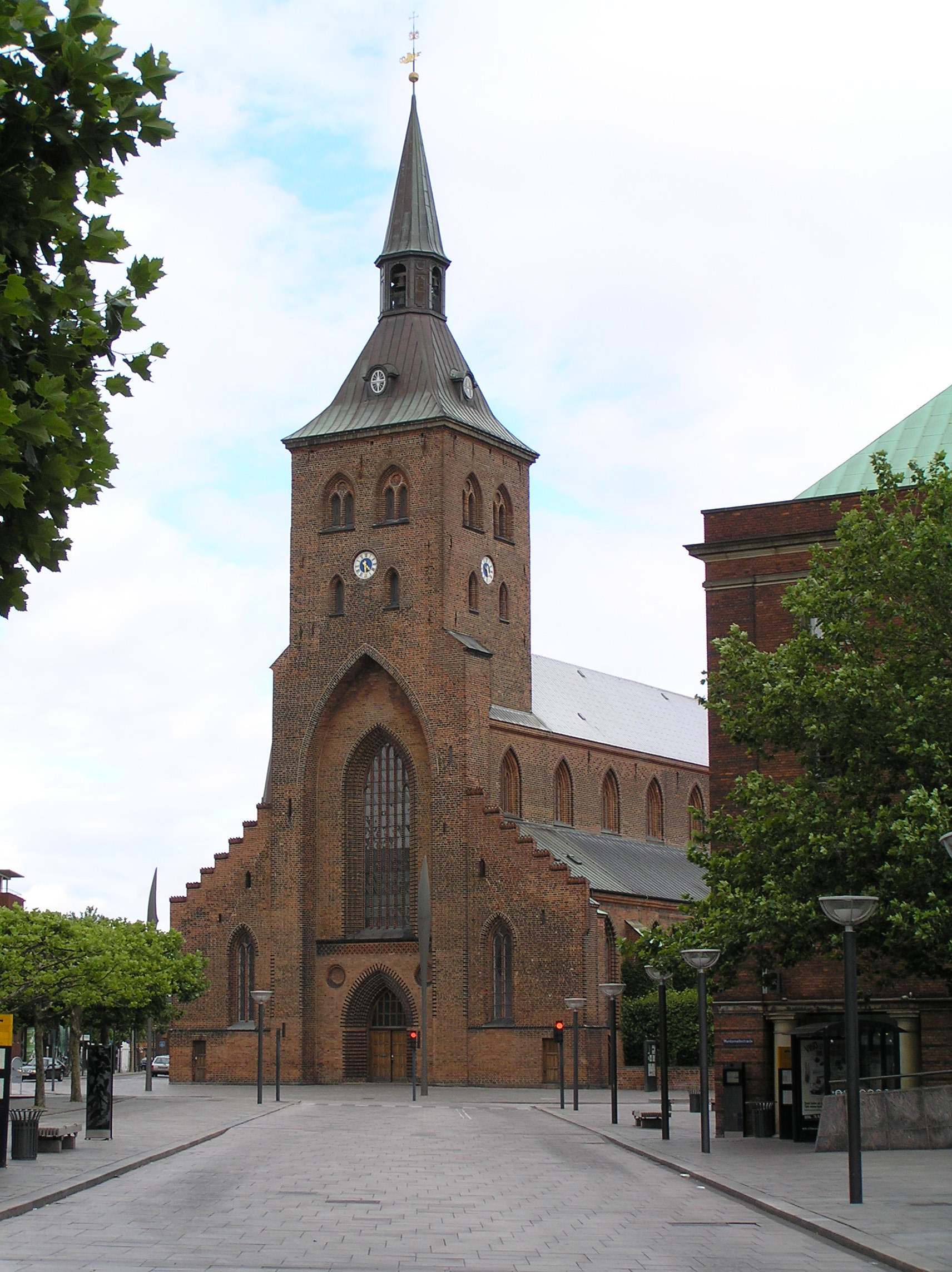
- Odense Domkirke

- Coat of arms

- Location within Denmark Location within Scandinavia Location within Europe
- Coordinates: 55°23′45″N 10°23′19″E
- Sovereign state: Danish Realm
- Constituent country: Denmark
- Region: Southern Denmark
- Municipality: Odense
- Established: 988
- City charter: 1355
- Municipality: 1970

Area
  - City: 80.1 km^{2} (30.9 sq mi)
  - Urban: 80.1 km^{2} (30.9 sq mi)
  - Metro: 3,481.30 km^{2} (1,344.14 sq mi)
  - Municipality: 305.60 km^{2} (117.99 sq mi)
- Elevation: 13 m (43 ft)

Population (2026)
  - City: 187,558
  - Density: 2,294/km^{2} (5,940/sq mi)
  - Urban: 187,558
  - Urban density: 2,340/km^{2} (6,060/sq mi)
  - Municipality: 213,168
  - Municipality density: 684/km^{2} (1,770/sq mi)
- Demonym: Odenseaner
- Time zone: UTC+1 (CET)
  - Summer (DST): UTC+2 (CEST)
- Postal code: 5000–5270
- Area code: (+45) 6
- Website: odense.dk

Odense (/ˈoʊdənsə/ OH-dən-sə, US also /ˈoʊθənsə/ OH-thən-sə; Danish: [ˈoðˀn̩sə]) is the third largest city in Denmark (after Copenhagen and Aarhus) and the largest city on the island of Funen. As of 1 January 2026, the city proper had a population of 187,558 while Odense Municipality had a population of 213,168, making it the fourth largest municipality in Denmark (behind Copenhagen, Aarhus and Aalborg municipalities). Eurostat and OECD have used a definition for the Metropolitan area of Odense (referred to as a Functional urban area), which includes all municipalities in the Province (Danish: landsdel) of Funen (Danish: Fyn), with a total population of 504,066 as of 1 July 2022.

By road, Odense is located 45 kilometres (28 mi) north of Svendborg, 144 kilometres (89 mi) to the south of Aarhus and 167 kilometres (104 mi) to the southwest of the capital Copenhagen. The city was the seat of Odense County until 1970, and Funen County from 1970 until 1 January 2007, when Funen County became part of the Region of Southern Denmark. Odense has close associations with Hans Christian Andersen who is remembered above all for his fairy tales. He was born in the city in 1805 and spent his childhood years there.

There has been human settlement in the Odense area for over 4,000 years, although the name was not mentioned in writing until 988, and by 1070, it had already grown into a thriving city. Canute IV of Denmark, generally considered to be the last Viking king, was murdered by unruly peasants in Odense's St Alban's Priory on 10 July 1086. Although the city was burned in 1249 following a royal rivalry, it quickly recovered and flourished as a centre of commerce in the Middle Ages. After a period of decline, large-scale plans for development were made during the 18th century, which led to the rebuilding of Odense Palace and the building of a canal to the Port of Odense, facilitating trade. In 1865, one of the largest railway terminals in Denmark was built, further increasing the population and commerce, and by 1900, Odense had reached a population of 35,000. Odense's Odinstårnet was one of the tallest towers in Europe when built in 1935 but was destroyed by the Nazis during World War II. The University of Southern Denmark was established in 1966.

Today, Odense remains the commercial hub of Funen, and is recognized internationally as a leading robotics city due to a cluster of robotics companies. Several other major industries are located in the city including the Albani Brewery and GASA, Denmark's major dealer in vegetables, fruits and flowers. The city is home to Odense Palace, erected by King Frederik IV who died there in 1730, the Odense Theatre, the Odense Symphony Orchestra, and the Hans Christian Andersen Museum. In 2021 the Hans Christian Andersen House designed by Japanese architect Kengo Kuma opened. It incorporates parts of the earlier museum like Andersen's birthplace and a domed memorial hall featuring frescos by Niels Larsen Stevns. In sports, Odense has a number of football clubs including OB, BM, B1909, and B1913, the Odense Bulldogs professional ice hockey team, and the city also hosts the H.C. Andersen Marathon. Odense is served by Hans Christian Andersen Airport and Odense station, which lies on the line between Copenhagen and the Jutland peninsula.

== Etymology ==
The name Odense is derived from Óðins vé, meaning "Odin's sanctuary", as the area was known as a sanctuary for worshippers of the Nordic god, Odin.

== History ==
For the Catholic ecclesiastical history, see Roman Catholic bishopric of Odense

=== Early history ===
Odense is one of Denmark's oldest cities. Archaeological excavations in the vicinity show proof of settlement for over 4,000 years since at least the Stone Age. The earliest community was centred on the higher ground between the Odense River to the south and Naesbyhoved Lake (now dry) to the north. Nonnebakken, one of Denmark's former Viking ring fortresses, lay to the south of the river. Today, Odense's Møntergården Museum has many artefacts related to the early Viking history in the Odense area. The Vikings built numerous fortifications along the river banks to defend it against invaders coming in from the coast.

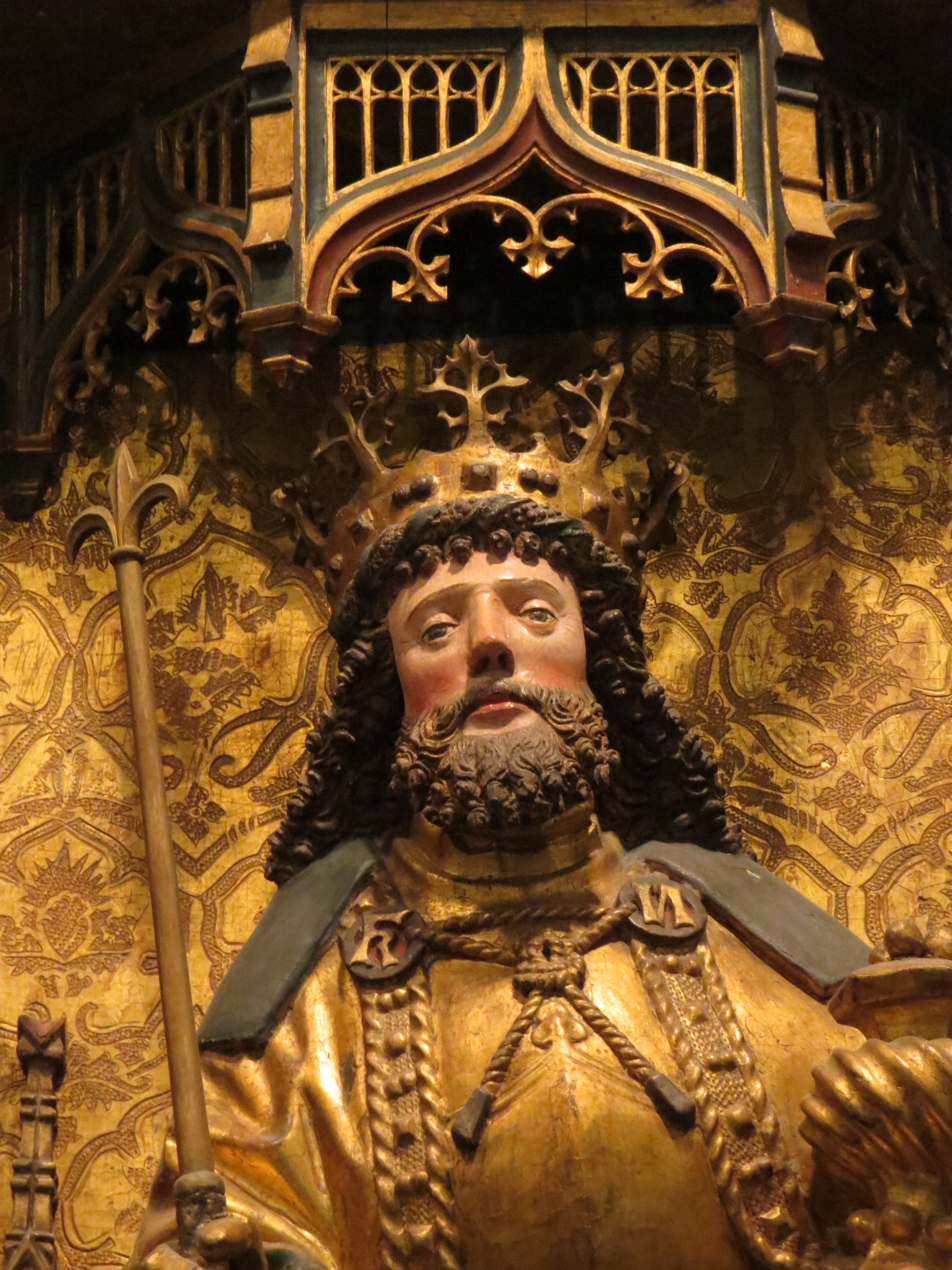
Canute IV of Denmark, generally considered to be the last Viking king, was murdered by unruly peasants in Odense in 1086

The city celebrated its thousandth anniversary in 1988, commemorating the first mention of the town's name in a letter dated 18 March 988 from the German emperor Otto III which granted rights to Odense and neighbouring settlements. The first church in Odense appears to have been St Mary's, probably built in the late 12th century. The territory, previously part of the vast Archbishopric of Hamburg, was created a Catholic diocese in 988. The first recorded bishops of Odense were Odinkar Hvide and Reginbert, who was consecrated by Archbishop Æthelnoth of Canterbury, in 1022.

Recent excavations have shown that from the early 11th century, the town developed in the area around Albani Torv, Fisketorvet, Overgade and Vestergade. By 1070, Odense had already grown into a city of stature in Denmark. Canute IV of Denmark, generally considered to be the last Viking king, was murdered by unruly peasants, discontent with the high taxes he imposed on the town, in Odense's St Alban's Priory on 10 July 1086. He was canonized in 1100. The priory no longer exists, although a church has been situated on the site since about 900. At the beginning of the 12th century, Benedictine monks from England founded St Canute's Abbey. It was here the English monk Ælnoth wrote Denmark's first literary work, Vita et Passio S. Canuti (The Life and Passion of St Canute). Canute's shrine in Odense Cathedral (which was attached to the priory) attracted pilgrims throughout the Middle Ages and can still be viewed today.

=== Middle Ages ===
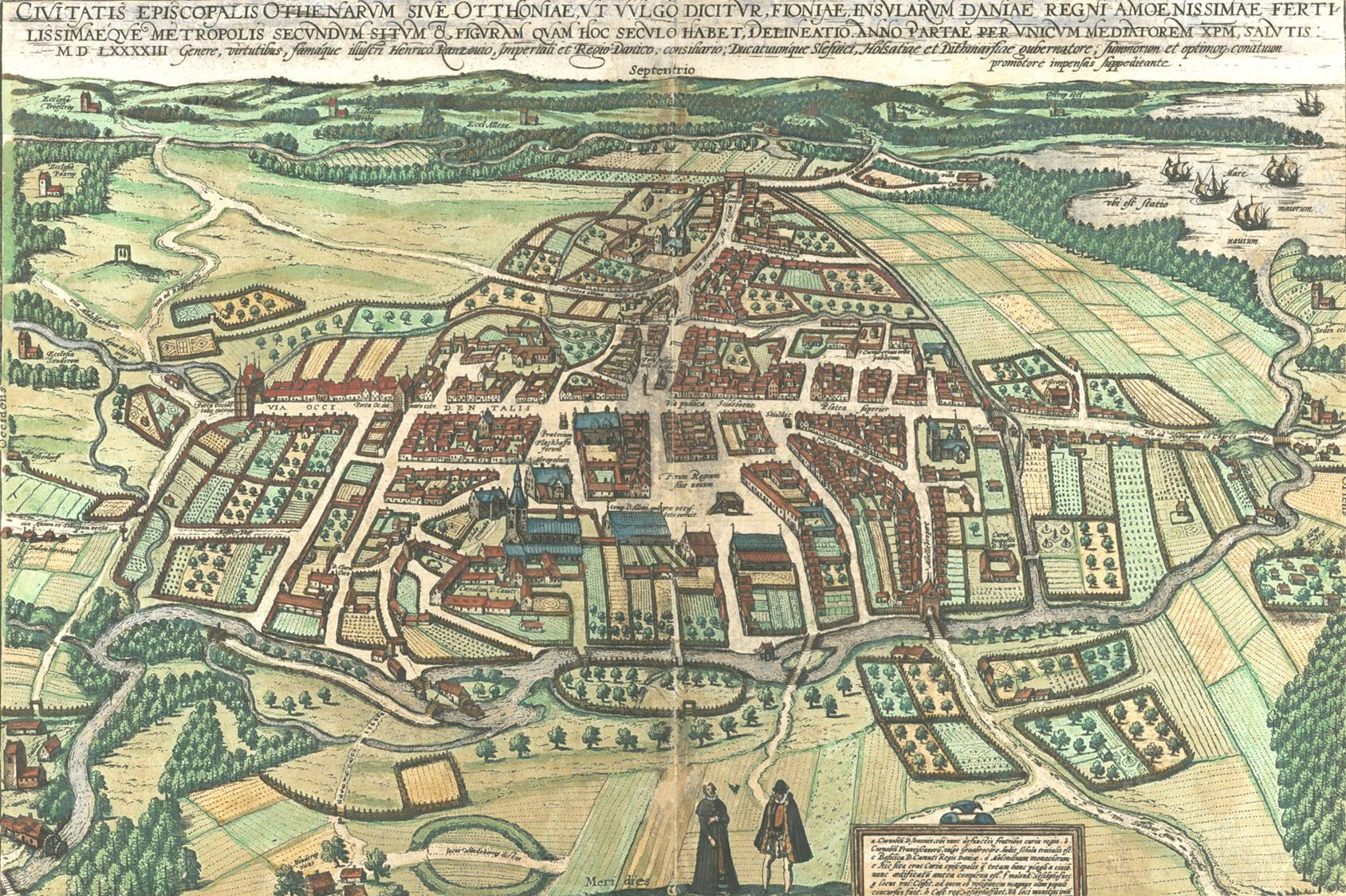
Braunius map of Odense from 1593

In the Middle Ages, a number of churches and monasteries were built in the town. St Canute's Church (Skt. Knuds Kirke), now the cathedral, dates from the end of the 13th century and was closely connected to the Benedictine Order. The town's other old churches are St Mary's (Vor Frue Kirke) and St John's (Skt. Hans Kirke) with its adjacent monastery. Greyfriars Monastery (Gråbrødre Kloster) was founded by the Franciscans in 1279.

In 1247 Odense was burned by Abel of Denmark during conflicts with his brother King Erik IV. The cathedral had to be completely rebuilt. Nevertheless, the town continued to flourish as a commercial centre, and was charted in 1335. The city thrived economically during the Middle Ages, attracting many merchants and craftsman who traded their goods.

In 1482 Bishop Karl Rønnov brought the German printer Johann Snell to Odense to print a short prayer book, Breviarium Ottoniense, considered to be the first work to be printed in Scandinavia. In parallel Snell printed De obsidione et bello Rhodiano, an account of the Turkish siege of the island of Rhodes.

After the Danish Reformation, involving the suppression of the Catholic bishopric in 1536, the city enjoyed a sustained period of prosperity from the 1530s to the mid-17th century, becoming northern Funen's commercial centre. One of the main sources of income was the sale of cattle, providing substantial funds for the construction of fine half-timbered houses for the local merchants. The local nobility also participated in the city's development by building residences where they spent the winter months. But the city's prosperity came to an abrupt end in the late 1650s heavy taxes were imposed after the end of the Swedish Wars. A period of stagnation ensued until the end of the 18th century.

From the 16th century the town was the meeting-place of several parliaments, and until 1805 Odense was the seat of the provincial assembly of Funen. By 1700 Odense's population was about 4,000.

=== Development ===
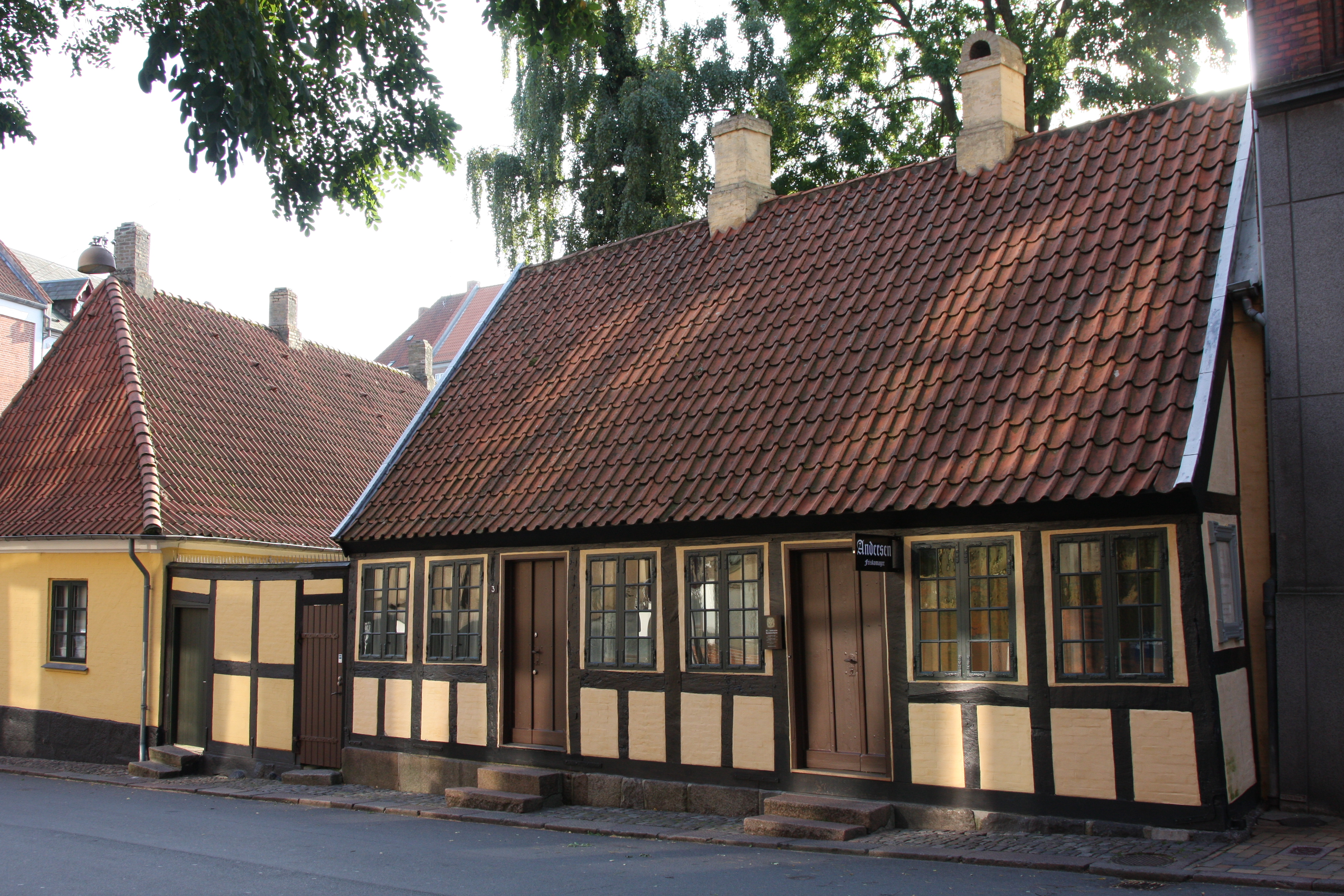
Hans Christian Andersen's childhood home

Dramatic changes began in Odense in the 18th century to modernise the city and a great plan was drawn up for development. In 1720, Frederick IV ordered the rebuilding of Odense Palace, partly on the foundations of the 13th century St. Hans's Monastery, and the construction of St Hans's Church by the Knights Hospitallers. An 8 kilometre (5.0 mi) long, 7.5 metre (25 ft) deep canal from Odense Harbour to Odense Fjord was built between 1796 and 1806 to facilitate the growth of Odense as a port city, radically increasing its level of trade and population. Founded in 1796, Odense Teater is the first provincial theatre in Denmark and the country's second oldest. Odense Central Library was established in 1924 and removed to Odense station in 1995. The Odense Music Library contains Denmark's largest collection of phonograms.

From the 1840s, the city enjoyed a period of rapid expansion beyond its traditional boundaries, becoming Denmark's second largest city. The city gates were demolished in 1851 and soon afterwards development extended to the area south of the river. Glove production, which had begun in the 18th century, developed into one of the most important industries while the harbour facilities were further expanded. In 1853 Denmark's first modern water and gas works were opened in Odense. Commerce was further boosted by the building of a railway across Funen in 1865, and Odense became one of Denmark's largest rail junctions. All this provided an ideal basis for industrialisation, attracting a wide range of industries including iron and metals, textiles, and food and beverages. Separate areas of the city were devoted to increased industrial and residential expansion, and the population of the city began to grow markedly; by 1900 it had 35,000 inhabitants.

=== Modern history ===
Odense's most famous landmark was Odinstårnet (The Odin Tower) constructed in 1935, as the second-tallest tower in Europe, only surpassed by the Eiffel Tower with its 177 meters. Odinstårnet was blown up by a Danish Nazi group in 1944 and has never been rebuilt. However, a miniature model now stands in Odinsparken in the area where the original was located. During the German occupation in the Second World War, Odense's general strike in August 1943 contributed to terminating collaboration with the Germans.

Until the beginning of the Danish industrial revolution, Odense was also the second-largest city in modern Denmark, but has in recent times been overtaken by Aarhus. From the 1960s Odense increasingly became a cultural hub, with the establishment of a university in 1966 and the launching of trade shows, including the large Odense Congress Centre. In 1988 a major national television network, TV2, was established in Odense.

In celebration of the thousandth anniversary in 1988, a forest, Tusindårsskoven (meaning "The Thousand Year Forest") was planted. The forest now hosts the annual music festival Tinderbox. In 2005 the city celebrated the 200th anniversary of the birth of Hans Christian Andersen and in 2025 the 150th anniversary of his death.

The Odense Steel Shipyard (Staalskibsvæeft), which since 1996 had been Denmark's largest shipbuilding facility, closed in 2012 as a result of international competition. Opened in 1919 by A.P. Møller, it latterly produced container ships for Mærsk, the parent company. The Lindø site was sold to the Port of Odense (Odense Havn) who are developing the Lindø Industrial Park.

== Geography ==
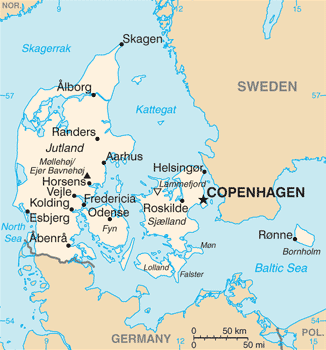
Location of Odense in Denmark

Odense is situated in the northeastern centre of the island of Funen. By road, Odense is located 45 kilometres (28 mi) north of Svendborg, 144 kilometres (89 mi) to the south of Aarhus, 167 kilometres (104 mi) to the southwest of Copenhagen, 136 kilometres (85 mi) east of Esbjerg and 69 kilometres (43 mi) southeast of Kolding. Suburbs of Odense include Stige to the north, Seden, Bullerup and Agedrup to the northeast, Blommenslyst to the west, Bellinge to the southwest, and Neder Holluf and Højby to the south.

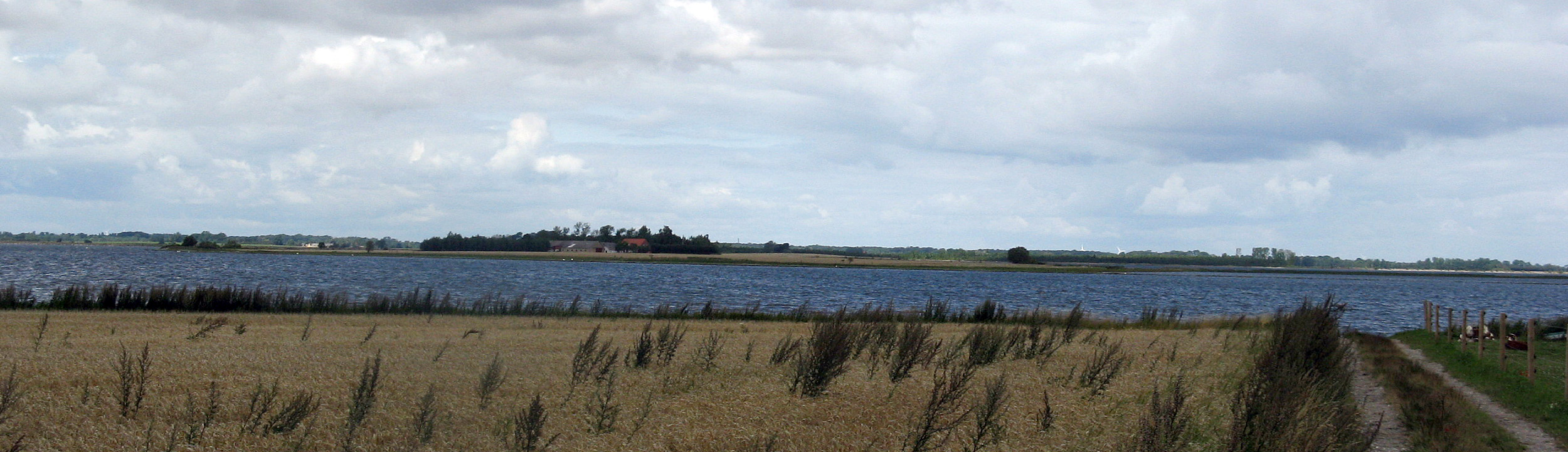
Tornø in the Odense Fjord

The Odense River flows through Odense, to the south of the main shopping quarter. To the north of the city is the Odense Fjord, and to the northeast, along the 165 road to Kerteminde is Kerteminde Fjord. The fjord is accessed through the narrow passage of Gabets, between Hals and Skoven, and is connected by canal to the Port of Odense. The small fishing village of Bregnør lies 2.3 miles (3.7 km) to the southeast of the passage. A controlling depth of 11 metres (36 ft) is reported in the northern part of channel between the entrance to the fjord and Lindo Terminal Quay. The bight of Fyns Hoved to the northeast of the harbour curves south to form the approach to Odense Fjord. The eastern side of the bight between Fyns Hoved and Skoven, 5.5 metres (18 ft) to the south, is irregular, with a beach and hills behind it, and to the south of the bight is the small, shallow Korshavn Bay, with the Korshavn Light in the vicinity. Skoven is a bare, rugged peninsula, with Dalby Bay (Dalby Bugt) to the east.

In the southwestern part of the Odense Fjord are the islands of Vigelsø and the 21 hectare Tornø, although the latter is connected to the mainland by a 300-metre (980 ft)-long causeway. Vigelsø is the largest island in the fjord at 132 hectares and is an important breeding ground for migratory birds. It is part of the Special Area of Conservation No. SPC 94, Odense Fjord under the EU Habitat and Birds Directives and has been subject to close monitoring, with the target to reach at least "good" ecological status by 2015. The island is low-lying, the highest point of Østerhoved only reaching six metres above the sea. There is a 25 hectare forest on the northern part of the island while the southern part consists of coastal meadows.

=== Climate ===
Odense has a temperate oceanic climate, classified as Köppen zone Cfb. Mild summers feature average maximum temperatures exceeding 20 °C (68 °F), while winters are characterised by minimum temperatures dropping just below freezing. The hottest months on average are July and August with highs of 21 °C (70 °F) and daily mean temperatures of 17 °C (63 °F) and 16 °C (61 °F) respectively. These are also the wettest months, with August receiving 80 mm (3.1 in) and July 64 mm (2.5 in) of rain on average. Extratropical cyclones frequently affect the region, contributing to abundant precipitation. The coldest months are January and February, with a daily mean temperature of 0 °C (32 °F), and lows of −2 °C (28 °F) and −3 °C (26 °F) respectively. It is common for Odense Fjord to contain ice between January and March, and the entrance is kept clear by icebreakers. The tidal range in the fjord varies up to 0.6 metres (2 ft 0 in), and winds from the west and northeast may raise the water level by up to 1.8 metres (5 ft 11 in) and winds from the east and southwest may lower it by up to 1.5 metres (4 ft 11 in). Climate data for the city are recorded at Hans Christian Andersen Airport (ICAO: EKOD).

Climate data for Odense (Hans Christian Andersen Airport) (1991–2020 normals, extremes 1971–2000)
Month	Jan	Feb	Mar	Apr	May	Jun	Jul	Aug	Sep	Oct	Nov	Dec	Year
Record high °C (°F)	11.2 (52.2)	13.4 (56.1)	18.5 (65.3)	27.4 (81.3)	28.8 (83.8)	37.0 (98.6)	33.4 (92.1)	33.6 (92.5)	27.7 (81.9)	23.0 (73.4)	15.8 (60.4)	12.4 (54.3)	37.0 (98.6)
Mean daily maximum °C (°F)	3.7 (38.7)	4.1 (39.4)	6.9 (44.4)	11.9 (53.4)	16.2 (61.2)	19.3 (66.7)	21.8 (71.2)	21.6 (70.9)	17.5 (63.5)	12.5 (54.5)	7.7 (45.9)	4.6 (40.3)	12.3 (54.2)
Daily mean °C (°F)	1.9 (35.4)	2.2 (36.0)	4.2 (39.6)	8.3 (46.9)	12.3 (54.1)	15.5 (59.9)	17.6 (63.7)	17.6 (63.7)	14.2 (57.6)	9.8 (49.6)	5.8 (42.4)	2.9 (37.2)	9.4 (48.8)
Mean daily minimum °C (°F)	0.1 (32.2)	0.2 (32.4)	1.4 (34.5)	4.7 (40.5)	8.3 (46.9)	11.6 (52.9)	13.5 (56.3)	13.6 (56.5)	10.8 (51.4)	7.1 (44.8)	3.9 (39.0)	1.2 (34.2)	6.4 (43.5)
Record low °C (°F)	−21.6 (−6.9)	−20.0 (−4.0)	−14.9 (5.2)	−5.3 (22.5)	−2.0 (28.4)	1.7 (35.1)	3.6 (38.5)	4.2 (39.6)	−1.4 (29.5)	−4.1 (24.6)	−16.2 (2.8)	−20.0 (−4.0)	−21.6 (−6.9)
Average precipitation mm (inches)	48.5 (1.91)	30.1 (1.19)	39.6 (1.56)	32.4 (1.28)	41.1 (1.62)	50.6 (1.99)	50.0 (1.97)	52.7 (2.07)	56.7 (2.23)	58.1 (2.29)	53.3 (2.10)	47.7 (1.88)	560.9 (22.08)
Average precipitation days (≥ 1.0 mm)	10.4	7.4	9.0	7.5	7.3	8.9	8.1	8.6	9.7	10.8	10.9	9.8	108.4
Average snowy days	6.0	4.4	3.9	1.1	0.0	0.0	0.0	0.0	0.0	0.0	1.6	3.3	20.9
Average relative humidity (%)	88	87	84	76	73	74	74	74	80	83	87	88	81
Mean monthly sunshine hours	40	61	124	179	258	265	256	224	175	101	44	28	1,755
Source 1: Danish Meteorological Institute (precipitation and snow 1971–2000, humidity 1961–1990, sun 1931–1960)
Source 2: IEM

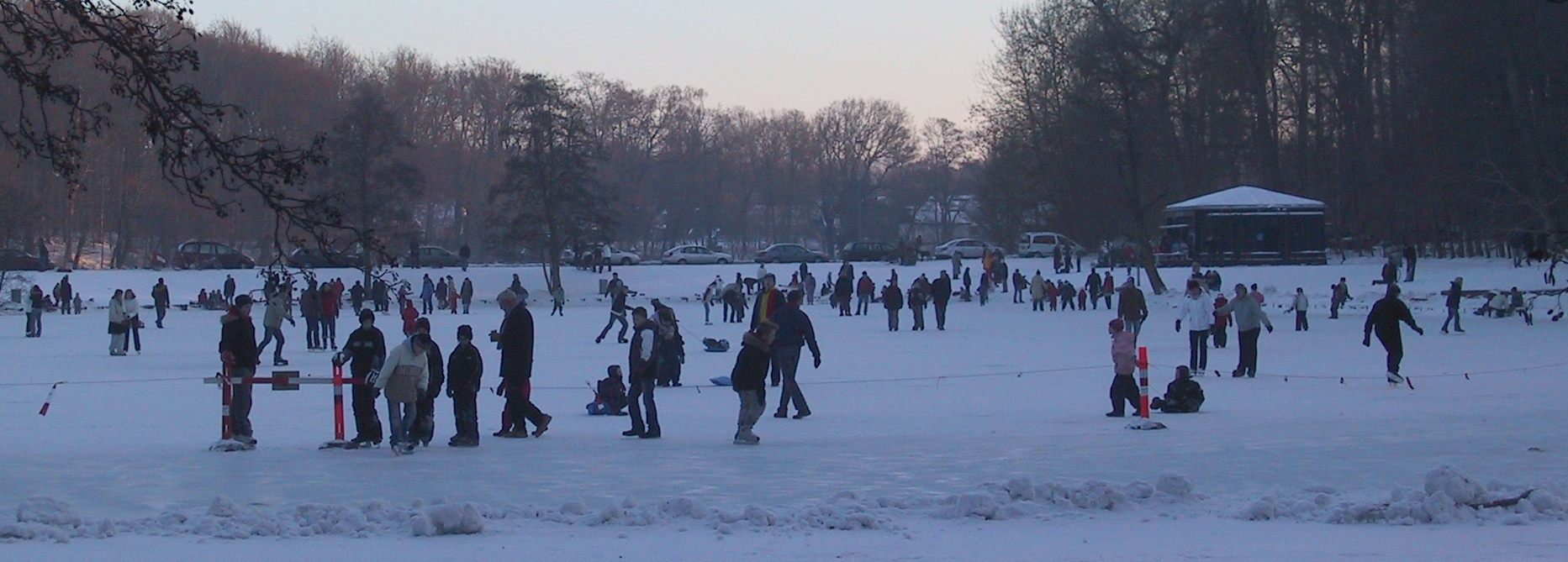
Winter at Skovsøen in Fruens Bøge, Odense

== Demographics ==
Odense has long been a populated town, and in 1670 it had a population of 3,808 people. By 1787 the population had grown to 5,363 to and 5,782 in 1801. The population grew markedly during the 19th century, reaching 8,709 inhabitants in 1834, 10,238 in 1845, 12,932 in 1855, 16,970 in 1870, 20,804 in 1880 and 30,268 in 1890.

With improvements in communications by rail and via the port, the population of Odense grew dramatically in the early 20th century. The 1901 census recorded 40,138 people, growing to 47,224 in 1911, 61,969 in 1921 and 87,090 in 1935. During the Second World War, the population passed the 100,000 mark, reaching 103,107 in 1945. It continued to grow in the post war years, with 120,570 recorded in 1955 and 133,384 in 1965; the city reached a population of 139,490 people in 1970, a time when it was developing as a university city after Odense University was established in 1966.

Residents began to move out of the centre into the suburban areas which were included in Odense Municipality after boundaries were redefined in 1970. As a result, the population declined slightly in the 1970s and 1980s, falling to 136,646 in 1981. It began climbing again in the late 1980s, and steadily grew to 144,518 in 1996 and 145,554 in 2004. In 2026 Odense had a population of 187,558 people.

Population groups	Year	
Population groups	2023	
Population groups	Number	%
Danish descent	171,670	82.59%
Immigrants	25,732	12.38%
EU-27	7,716	3.71%
Europe outside EU-27	8,376	4.03%
Africa	3,944	1.9%
North America	301	0.14%
South and Central America	542	0.26%
Asia	15,192	7.31%
Oceania	76	–
Stateless		–
Unknown		–
Total	207,864	100%

Largest groups of foreign residents
Nationality	Population
Turkey	2,413
Somalia	2,296
Vietnam	2,177
Bosnia and Herzegovina	1,761
Poland	1,639
Syria	1,314
Germany	1,312
Iran	1,129
Romania	901

== Municipal administration ==
Odense Municipality is the administrative unit which covers not only the city of Odense but surrounding suburbs and villages. Odense City Council consists of 29 members, including a mayor. The former mayor of Odense, Anker Boye, is a member of the Social Democratic Party. His first term was from 1993 to 2005 when he was defeated by Jan Boye, a Conservative. He was re-elected in the 2009 election, forming a coalition with the Red–Green Alliance, the Socialist People's Party and the Social Democrats. Boye and his administration have been criticised for mismanaging the celebrations for the 200th anniversary of Hans Christian Andersen in 2005, above all for allegedly signing a contract with Tina Turner for a show which resulted in a deficit of 13 million kroner.

In the 2013 municipal elections, Boye was successful in obtaining sufficient support from the Liberals and the left to ensure his continuation as mayor from the beginning of 2014.

Boye announced in December 2016 that he would resign as mayor on 1 January 2017. The new mayor of Odense would be Peter Rahbæk Juel, also a member of the Social Democrats. Rahbæk Juel succeeded Boye as announced and continues to serve as mayor after the municipal elections in 2017 and 2021.

== Economy ==
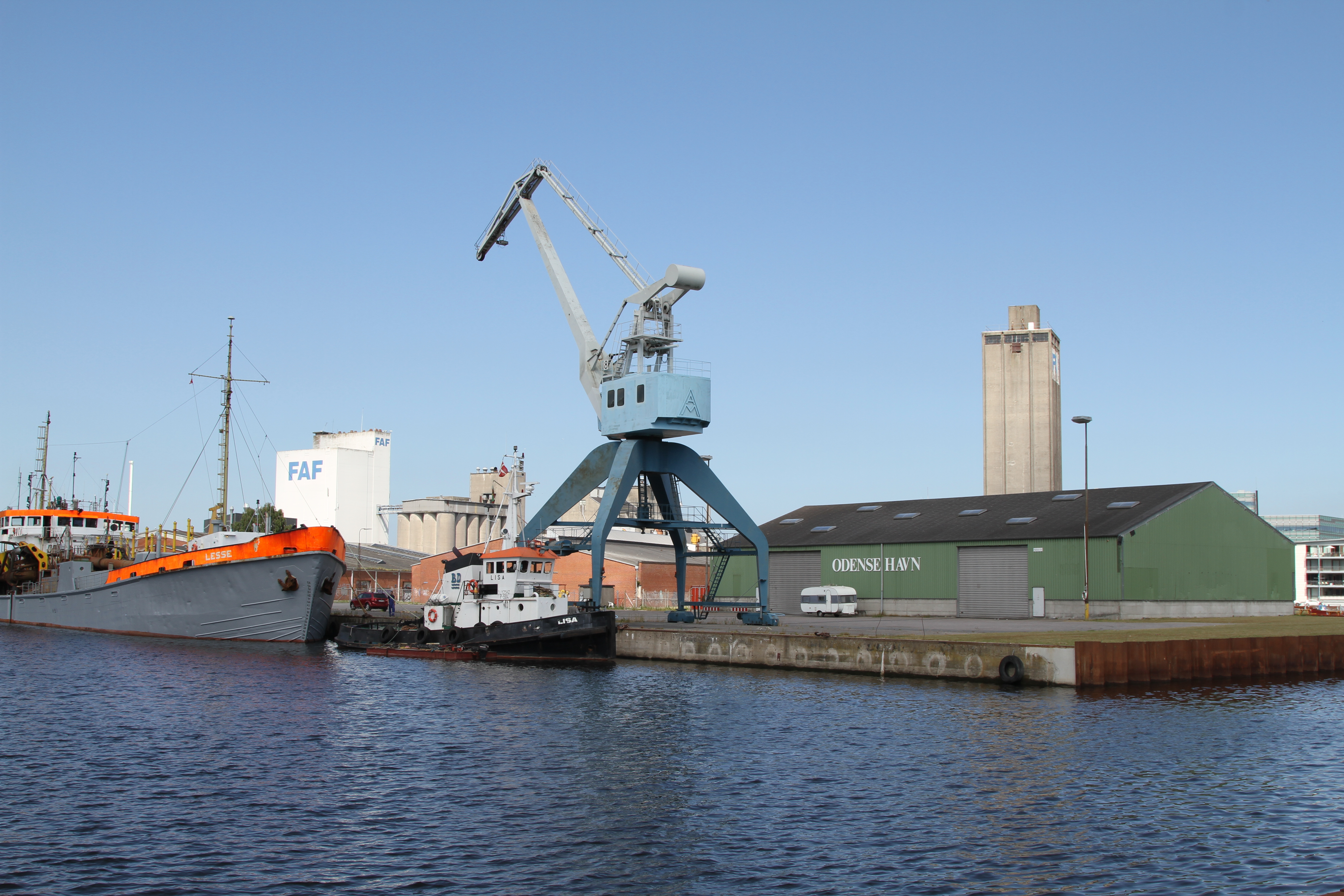
Port of Odense

Odense is Funen's most important industrial and commercial centre, and the city's central location in Denmark makes it one of the national convention and congress centres. Enterprises include the Albani Brewery, ABB (Asea Brown Boveri), Kansas Workwear (clothing), Plus Pack (canning and containers) as well as manufacturers in the electrical sector such as Riegens / SG Lighting. In recent years there has been a general trend from manufacturing into the service sector. By 2002, 51% of the workforce was employed by the service sector while only 13% were working in industry. Lindø Wharf, once Denmark's largest shipbuilding facility, has now been converted into Lindø Industrial Park specialising in the production and storage of components for the offshore industries, creating a variety of new tenants. GASA, a large horticultural centre, supplies fruit, vegetables, flowers and plants to most of the country as well as for export. Established in 1988, Denmark's major commercial television channel TV 2 is based in Odense.

The Rosengårdcentret shopping centre is located in the south-eastern part of Odense. The centre dates from 1971 and is the largest in Denmark with 140,000 m^{2} (1,500,000 sq ft) floor space and more than 150 shops as well as restaurants, a cinema and a fitness centre. Denmark's second-largest IKEA outlet is the biggest neighbour. A wide variety of shops can be found in the city centre, especially on Kongensgade and Vestergade and adjacent pedestrian streets.

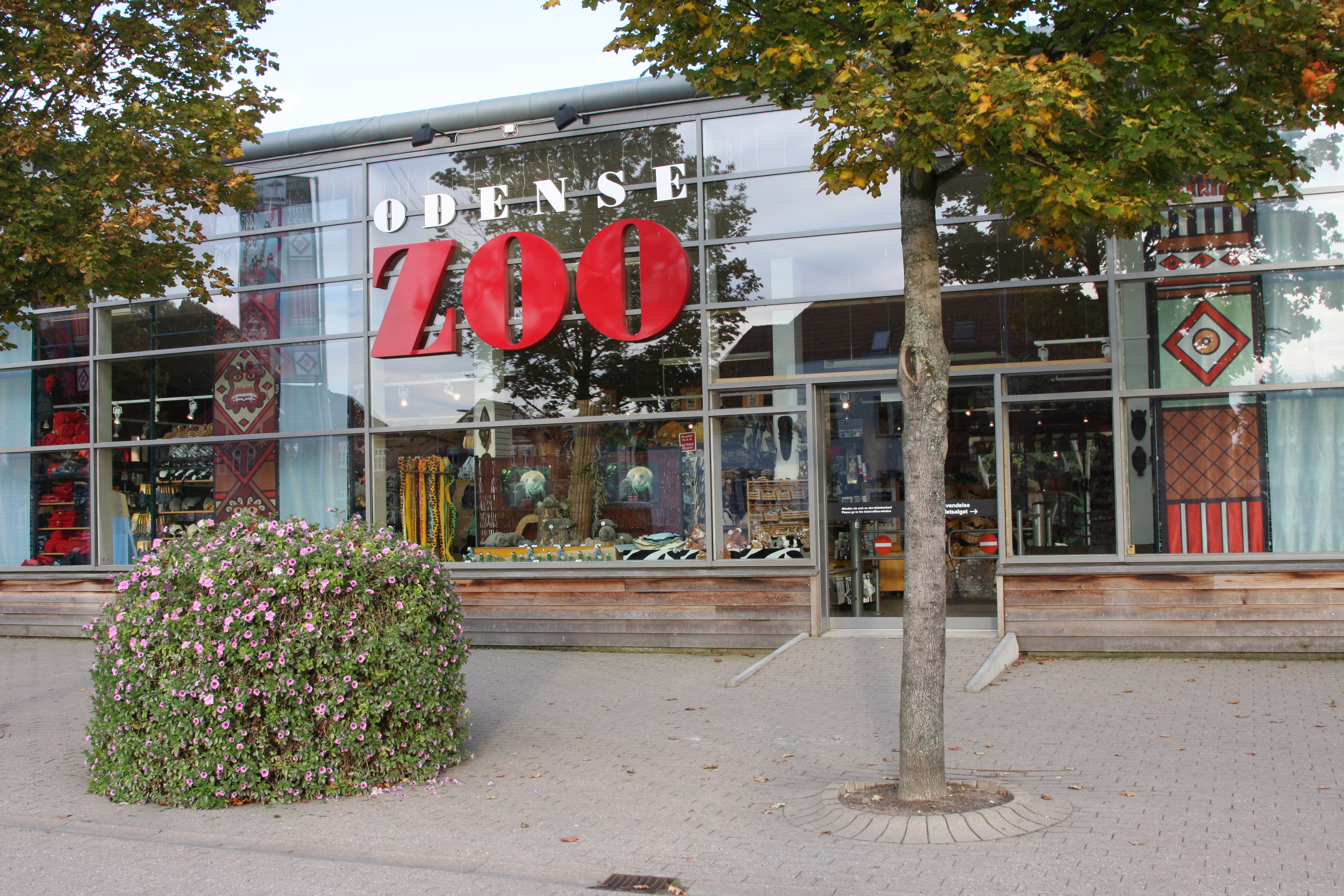
Odense Zoo

Tourism is an important source of income for the city. In 2008 Odense Municipality was listed seventh in Denmark for turnover on tourism, reaching 1.6 million Danish kroner for the year. In 2011, Odense Zoo was Funen's most popular tourist attraction and the eleventh most popular in Denmark with 405,913 visitors. The zoo was founded in 1930 and covers an area of 3.6 hectares (8.9 acres) and has roughly 2,000 animals, covering 147 species. In 2001, Odense Zoo inaugurated a DKK 60 million "Oceanium" featuring South American animal life.

Nightlife in the city culminates in Brandts Passage, which contains numerous restaurants, bars and cafes. Hotels of note include the Comwell H.C. Andersen Hotel, the First Hotel Grand with its brasserie bar, the 68-room Old English-style Milling Hotel Plaza, City Hotel Nattergalen, which is in close proximity to the Hans Christian Andersen museum, and the 140-room Danhostel Odense City.

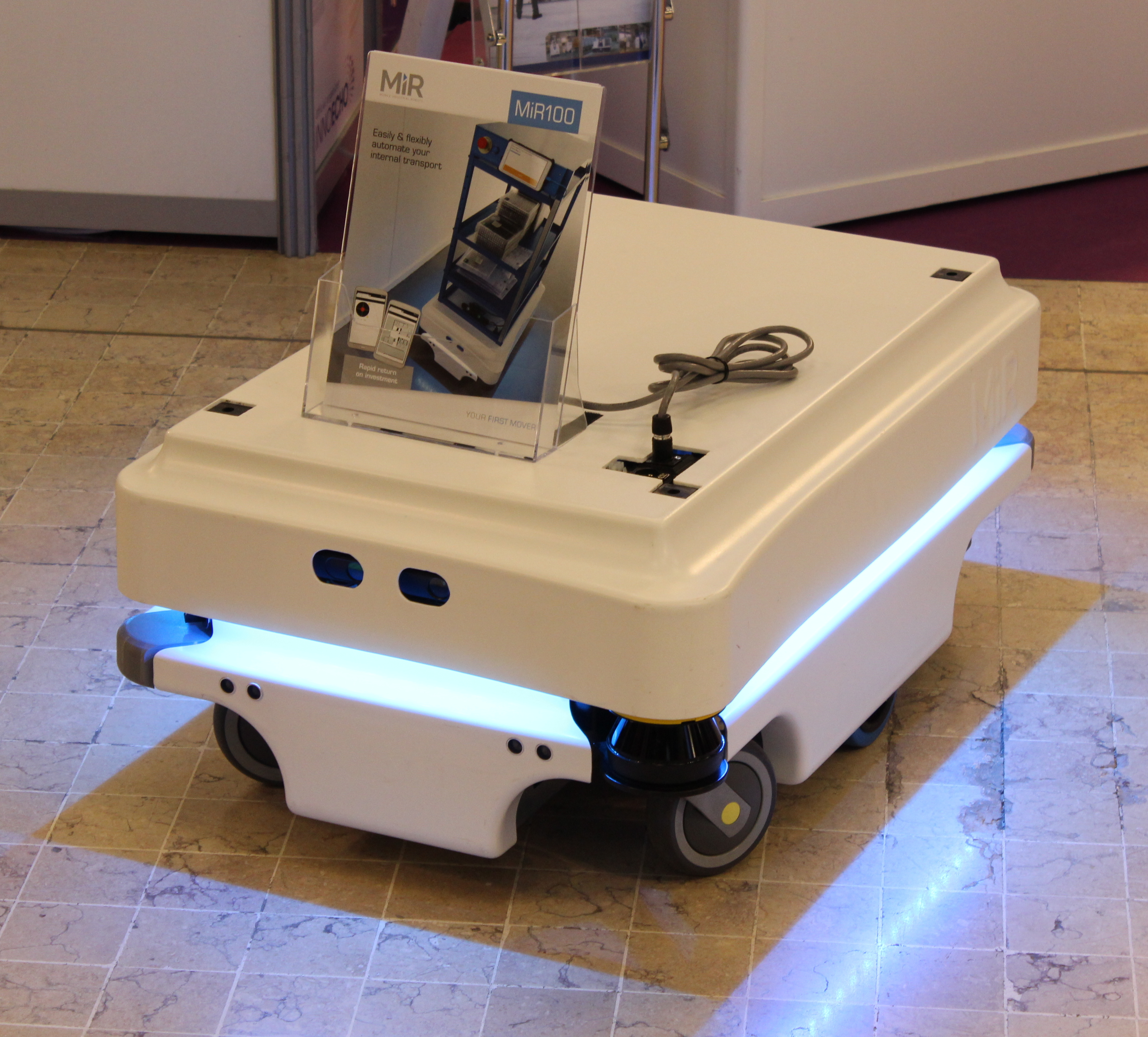
A robot from the Odense-based robotics company MiR, or Mobile Industrial Robots.

Odense has become an internationally recognized hub for robotics, particularly following the success of companies such as Universal Robots and Mobile Industrial Robots (MiR). The city hosts numerous startups, leading academic institutions in robotics at the University of Southern Denmark, the national drone test center at Hans Christian Andersen Airport, and the national Danish cluster for the robot industry, Odense Robotics, with more than 300 robotics, drone and automation companies, employing nearly 20,000 people. Odense is especially known for its advancements in collaborative robots, or "co-bots."

== Landmarks ==
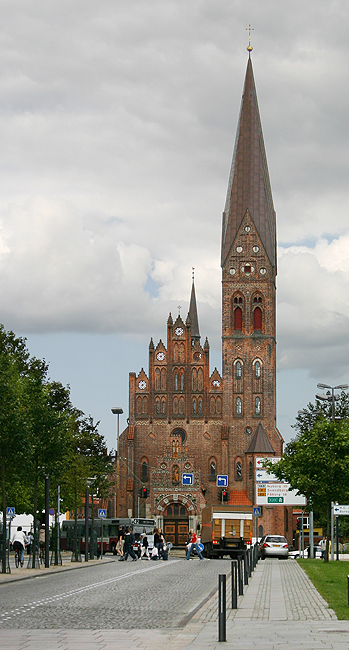
St Alban's Church, Odense

Nonnebakken, a hill in the Odense area, is the site of one of Denmark's six former Viking ring castles, built during the reign of Sweyn Forkbeard, who had forced his father Harold Bluetooth to leave the country and seek refuge by the Jomsvikings in Wollin (modern Poland) in around 975. The fort provided its occupier the command of the Odense River passing next to the hill. The archaeological remains of the fort were heavily damaged when a building for the Odd Fellow lodge was constructed on the site during the late nineteenth century.

=== Churches ===
Odense is the see of the bishop of Funen. Saint Canute's Cathedral (Danish: Sankt Knuds Kirke) was formerly connected with the great Benedictine monastery of the same name, and is one of the largest and finest buildings of its kind in Denmark. Originally dating from 1081 to 1093, the church was rebuilt in the 13th century in brick in a pure Gothic style. Under the altar lies Canute (Danish: Knud), the patron saint of Denmark and his brother on public display. A large fragment of Byzantine cloth is displayed next to the two skeletons. The cathedral also boasts one of Denmark's most remarkable altarpieces, a magnificent triptych by Claus Berg. Kings Hans and Christian II are buried in the city.

St Alban's Church, built in the Neogothic style and consecrated in 1908, is the Roman Catholic church of Odense. Its steeple is 54 m (177 ft) high. St Mary's Church (Vor Frue Kirke or Our Lady's Church), built in the 13th century and restored in 1851–1852 and again in 1864, contains a carved 16th-century altarpiece by Claus Berg of Lübeck. St John's Church (Sankt Hans Kirke), first mentioned in 1295, was built by the Knights Hospitaller, also known as the Order of Saint John. Not much of the original building remains as it was rebuilt in 1636 and subsequently restored. Built of red brick with horizontal decorations on the chancel wall, it has large Gothic windows. The date of 1496 on one of the bells in the step-ribbed tower may well be the year the church was completed. The tower is adjacent to Odense Palace which was originally built as a monastery.

Ansgars Church was the first church to be built in Odense since the Middle Ages. Completed in 1902, it was designed by Niels Jacobsen in the late Romanesque style in red brick on granite foundations. The cross-shaped interior is complemented by a spired bell-tower, 45 m (148 ft) high. The Peace Church (Fredenskirke) consecrated in 1920 was so named in gratitude for the end of the First World War. The church was the work of Peder Vilhelm Jensen-Klint who went on to design Copenhagen's Grundtvig's Church.

=== City Hall ===
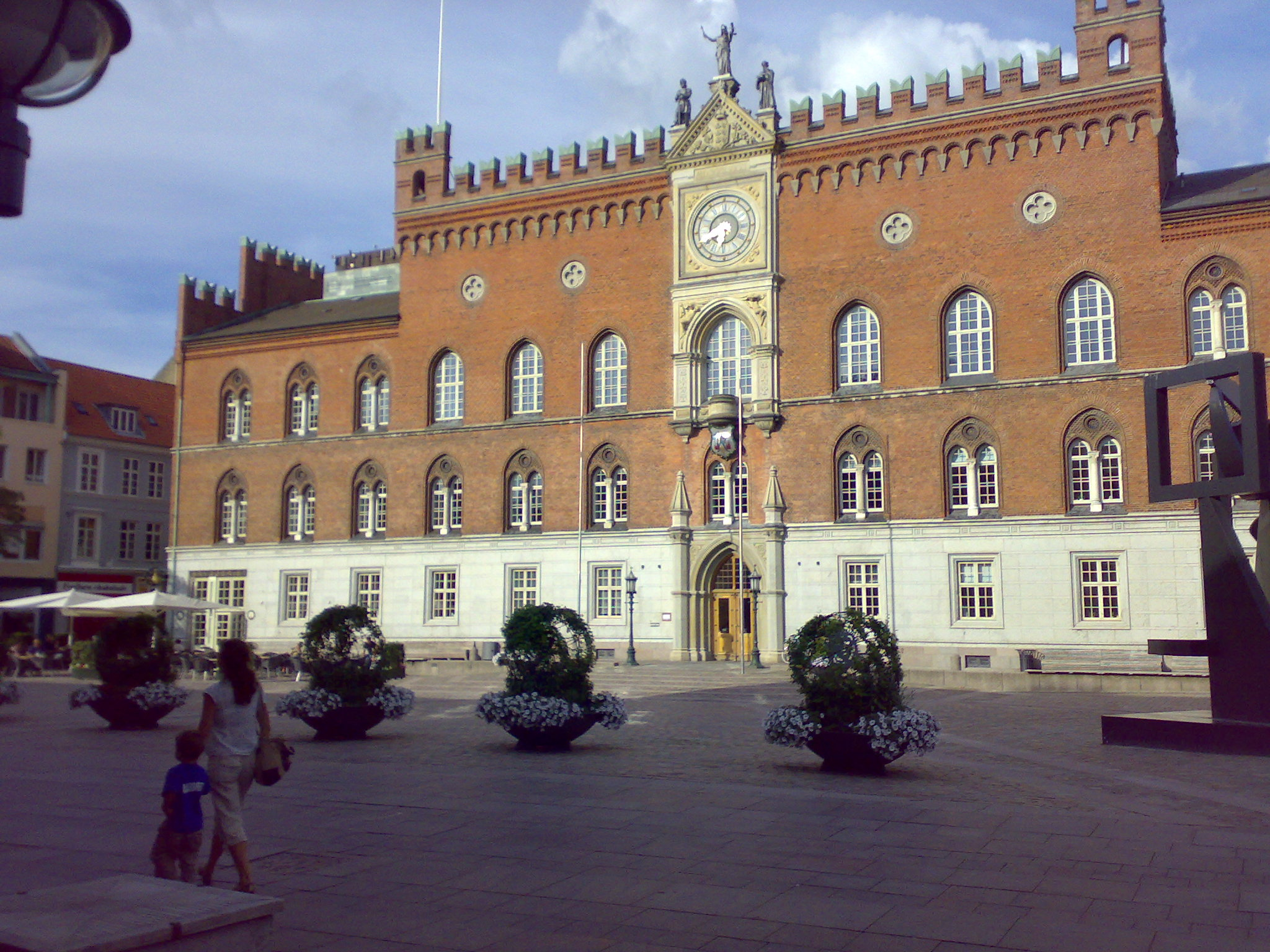
City Hall

Odense's City Hall (Odense Rådhus), with its medieval Italian look, was designed by Johan Daniel Herholdt and Carl Lendorf in the Historicist style. Completed in 1883, it combines red masonry with sandstone decorations, stepped gables and a saw-tooth course. It stands on the site of a smaller building from 1480. In 1937 Bent Helveg-Møller won the competition for the building's enlargement. The tower over the main entrance was torn down in 1942 but was not rebuilt. As work was delayed during the war, the extension was not completed until 1955. In conjunction with Hans Christian Andersen's 200th anniversary in 2005, comprehensive renovation work was completed on the building's interiors, including the entrance halls, meeting rooms, banqueting hall and council chamber.

=== Palaces and theatres ===
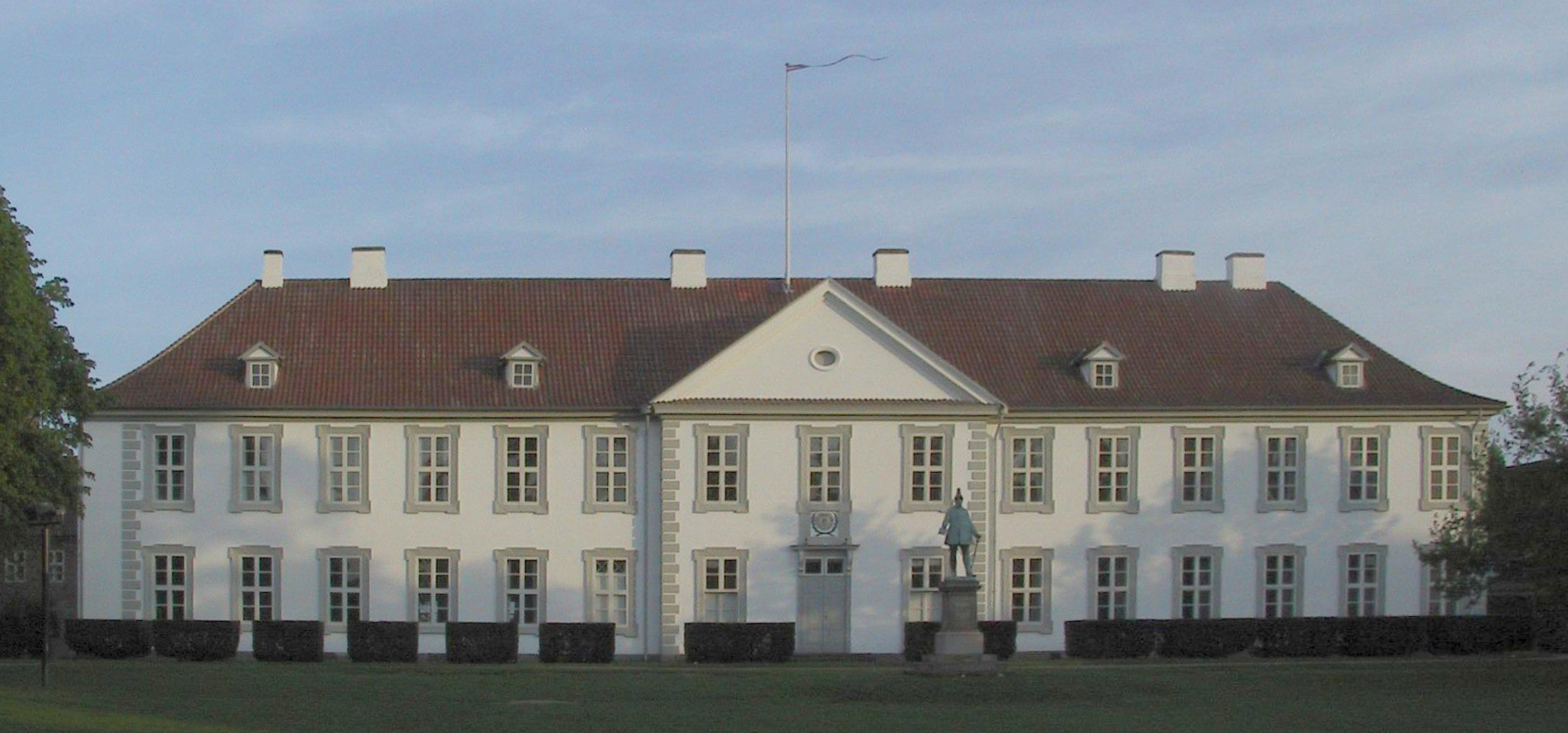
Odense Palace

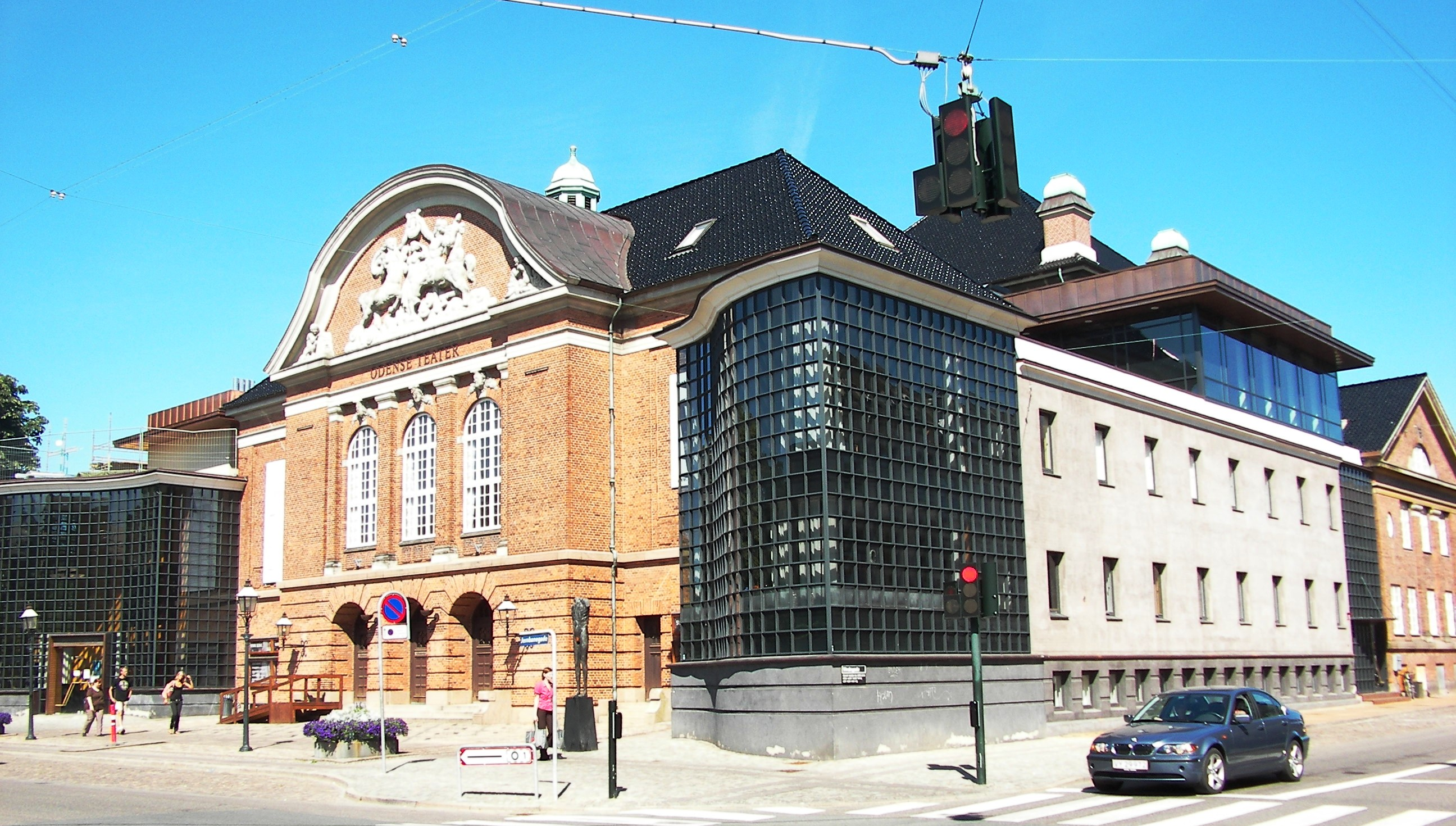
Odense Theater

Odense Palace was erected by Frederick IV, who died there in 1730. Now an administrative building, it stands on the site of Sankt Hans Kloster, a 15th-century monastery which was transferred to the Crown in 1536. The main white Baroque wing with 13 bays was designed by J.C. Krieger for Frederick IV and completed in 1723. Set in a park, the King's Garden was constructed to a French design by Johan Cornelius Krieger.

Odense Teater, first established in 1796, is Denmark's second oldest theatrical enterprise and one of the country's three main theatres. The original building was on Sortebrødre Torv was used until 1914 when a new building designed by Jacobsen was opened on Jernbanegade. It has three stages: Store Scene, Værkstedet, and Foyerscenen. The theatre also has stages in the former sugar factory Sukkerkogeriet, where it runs the first drama school outside Copenhagen established in 1941. It is notable in theatrical history for staging the première of Henrik Ibsen's first contemporary realist drama The Pillars of Society on 14 November 1877. Teater Momentum or Teater uden Ryglæn, publicly funded by the municipal government and the Ministry of Cultural Affairs, is also of note. Established in 2005, it signs on a new director each year who is charged with creating the "volume" of the year with a set of plays and performers. It also puts on other cultural entertainment including concerts, debates, lectures and poetry.

Odense Symphony Orchestra (Odense Symfoniorkester), one of Denmark's five regional orchestras, was formally established in 1946. The orchestra is based in Odense Concert Hall, which was inaugurated in 1982. Most of the orchestra's concerts are given in the Carl Nielsen Hall, a seating capacity of 1,212 and a large 46-stops organ built by Marcussen & Son. First established in 1948, Funen Opera (Den Fynske Opera) was reopened in 1996 after a period of closure. It specializes in presenting contemporary operas in Danish.

=== Hans Christian Andersen connections ===
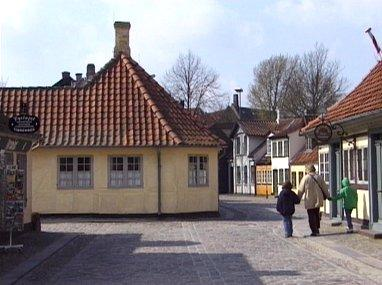
Hans Christian Andersen's home

Remembered above all for his fairy tales, Hans Christian Andersen was born in Odense in 1805. It is thought his birthplace is the small yellow house on the corner of Hans Jensens Stræde and Bangs Boder in the old town. In 1908 the house was opened as the Hans Christian Andersen Museum. It documents his life from his childhood years as the son of a struggling shoemaker, to his schooling, career as an author, and later life, with artefacts providing an insight into his acquaintances and adventures. Andersen's childhood home is on Munkemøllestræde not far from the cathedral. He lived in the little half-timbered house from the age of two until he was 14. Opened as a museum in 1930, the house contains an exhibition of the cobbling tools used by his father and other items based on Andersen's own descriptions.

Throughout the city there are numerous statues and sculptures representing characters from the stories of Hans Christian Andersen. They include the Steadfast Tin Soldier, the Mermaid, the Shepherdess and the Chimney Sweep, the Toad, the Darning Needle, the Emperor's New Clothes, the Sea Horse, the Paper Boat, the Flying Trunk and the Wild Swans. A statue of Andersen stands in Eventyrhaven (The Fairy Tale Park), beside the cathedral. Sculpted by Louis Hasselriis in 1888, it shows the storyteller with a book in his hand, ready to entertain onlookers with his fairy tales.

=== Museums ===
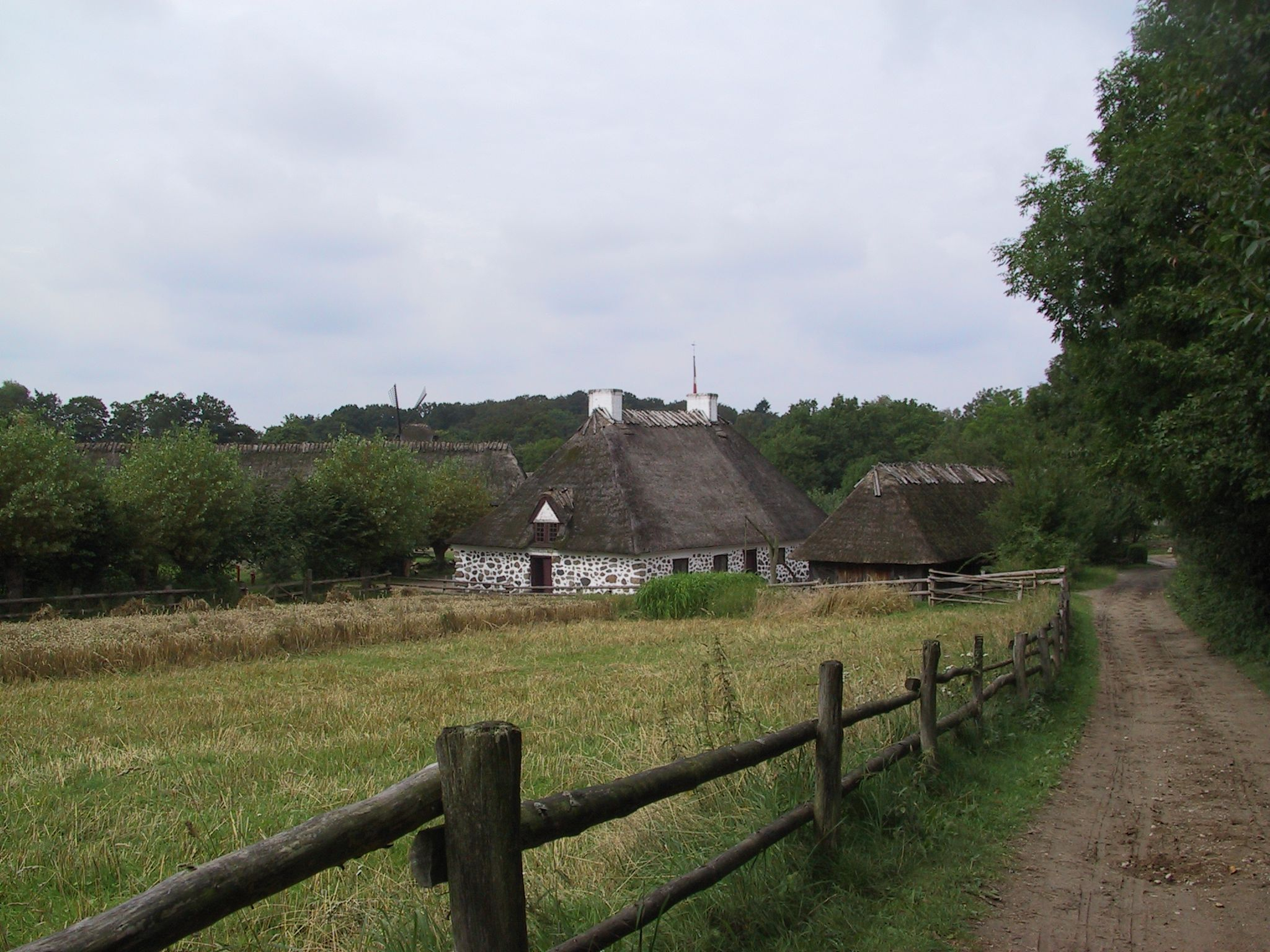
Scene from The Funen Village

The museums in Odense are mainly governed by the Odense City Museums, a department of the municipal government. Funen's Art Museum (Fyns Kunstmuseum), formerly The Museum of Funen Diocese, was one of Denmark's oldest art museums, dating to 1885. It contained the principal works by Jens Juel, Dankvart Dreyer, P.S. Krøyer and H. A. Brendekilde. The museum is now closed and all works transferred to the Kunstmuseum Brandts.The open-air The Funen Village museum (Den Fynske Landsby) tries to emulate what country life was like in Denmark at the time of Andersen's life and contains houses of historical Odense. Another focus area is sustainability and circular economy and what that entailed in the 1800s.

The Carl Nielsen Museum is dedicated to the life of Carl Nielsen and his wife, the sculptor Anne Marie Carl-Nielsen. It documents his life from his childhood in the town of Nr. Lyndelse, to his career and success on the European music scene, with his violins, his bugle and his grand piano on display, as well as a number of his musical scores, including six symphonies, three concertos, two operas, and chamber music and numerous songs.

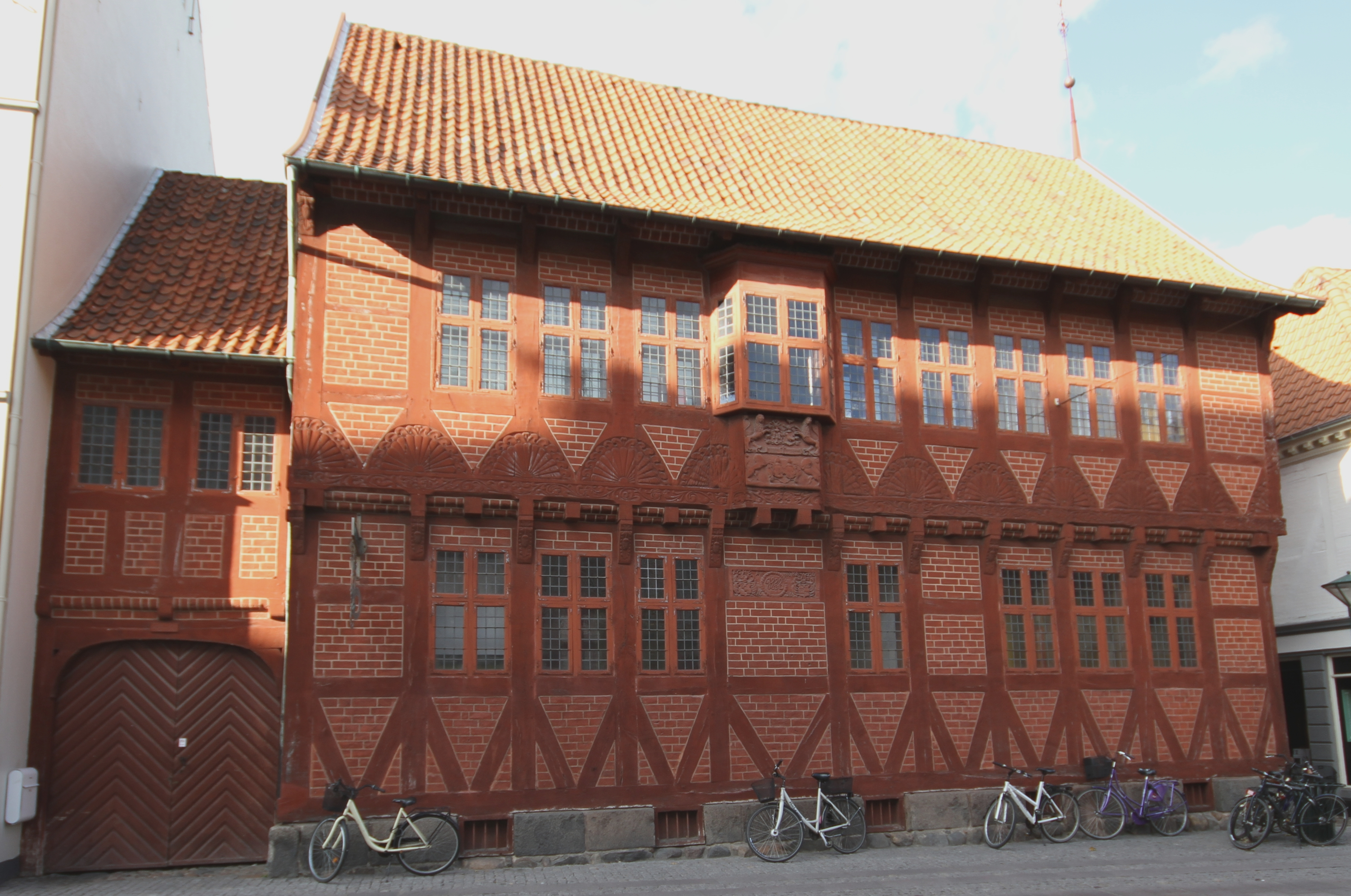
Møntergården

The Møntergården - now Museum TID - cultural history museum of Odense is one of the most notable remaining Renaissance buildings of the city, built in 1646 by the nobleman Falk Gøye. It has many artefacts related to the early Viking history in Odense, and was named after the narrow street Møntestræde adjacent to the building, where a coin workshop once operated in around 1420. Located in a courtyard of half-timbered houses, the museum also has exhibits on Funen's ancient history, as well as Odense in the Middle Ages and the Renaissance.

The Danish Railway Museum is the national railway museum of Denmark, the largest such museum in Scandinavia. It was established in 1975 in a former engine shed adjacent to the city's main railway station and has an area of over 10,000 metres (33,000 ft), with some 50 locomotives and railway carriages on 20 rail tracks from all periods of Danish rail history. The oldest steam engine dates back to 1869.

Kunstmuseum Brandts is situated in the old industrial quarter and showcases Danish and international art. Over the years it has housed various semi-permanent exhibitions like the Brandts Museum of Photographic Art, The Media Museum, and the classic collection from the former Fyns Kunstmuseum. It was founded on 13 September 1985 as part of the Brandts International Centre for Art and Culture and opened its own exhibition space in 1987.

Tidens Samling (HANDS-ON Museum of fashion and interior 1900–1999) shows Danish design and fashion from the 20th century. Decade after decade you can walk through the recent past,´.

== Education ==
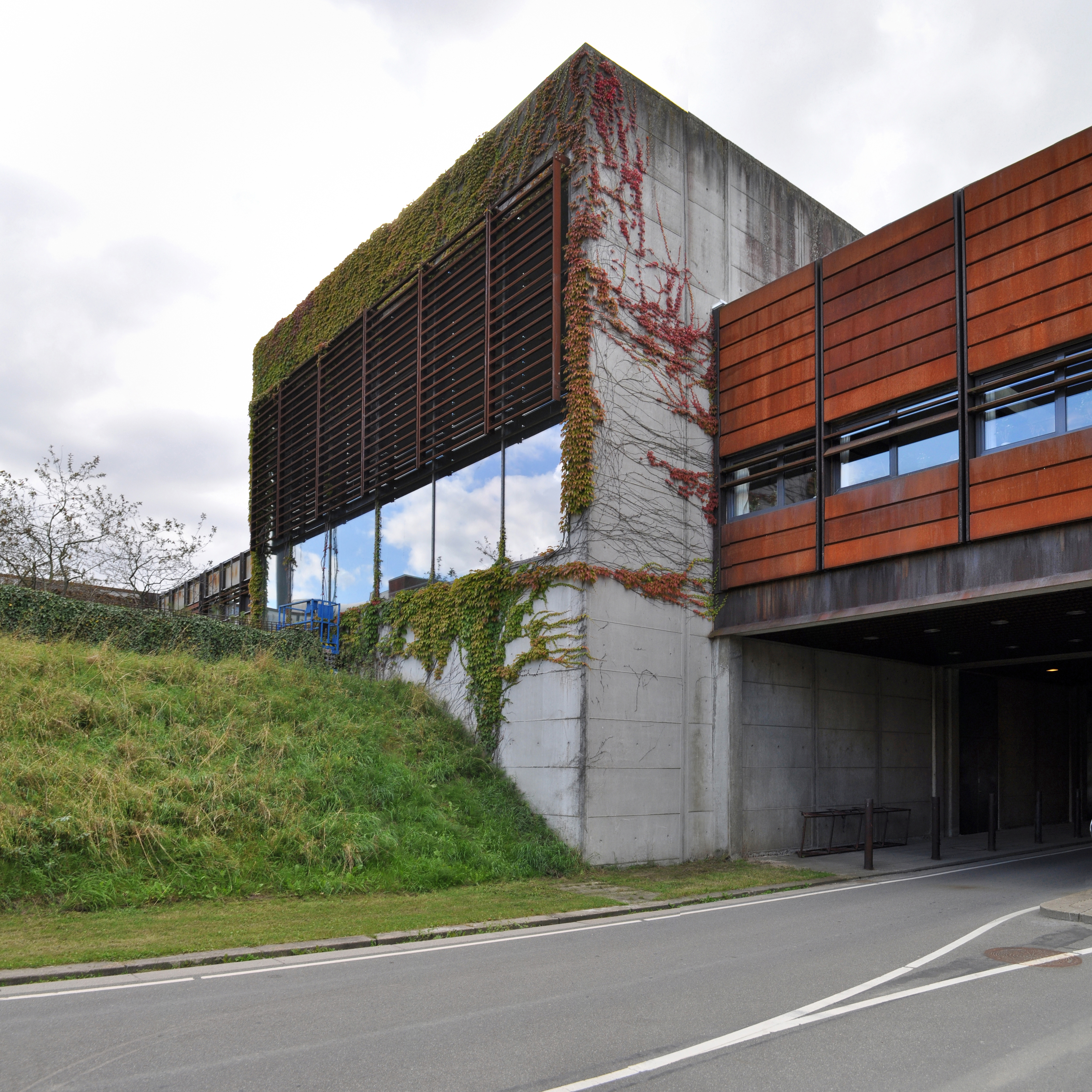
Odense University (1966) designed by Knud Holscher of KHR Arkitekter

=== Odense University ===
Odense University, established by law in 1964, was the first of three new provincial universities created to relieve pressure on the universities of Copenhagen and Aarhus. Teaching began in 1966. By the end of the 20th century, there were 11,000 students and some 5,000 employees. Before it became part of the University of Southern Denmark in 1998, it had four faculties covering arts, medicine, and natural and social sciences. The university building which opened in 1971 was designed by KHR Arkitekter.

=== University of Southern Denmark ===
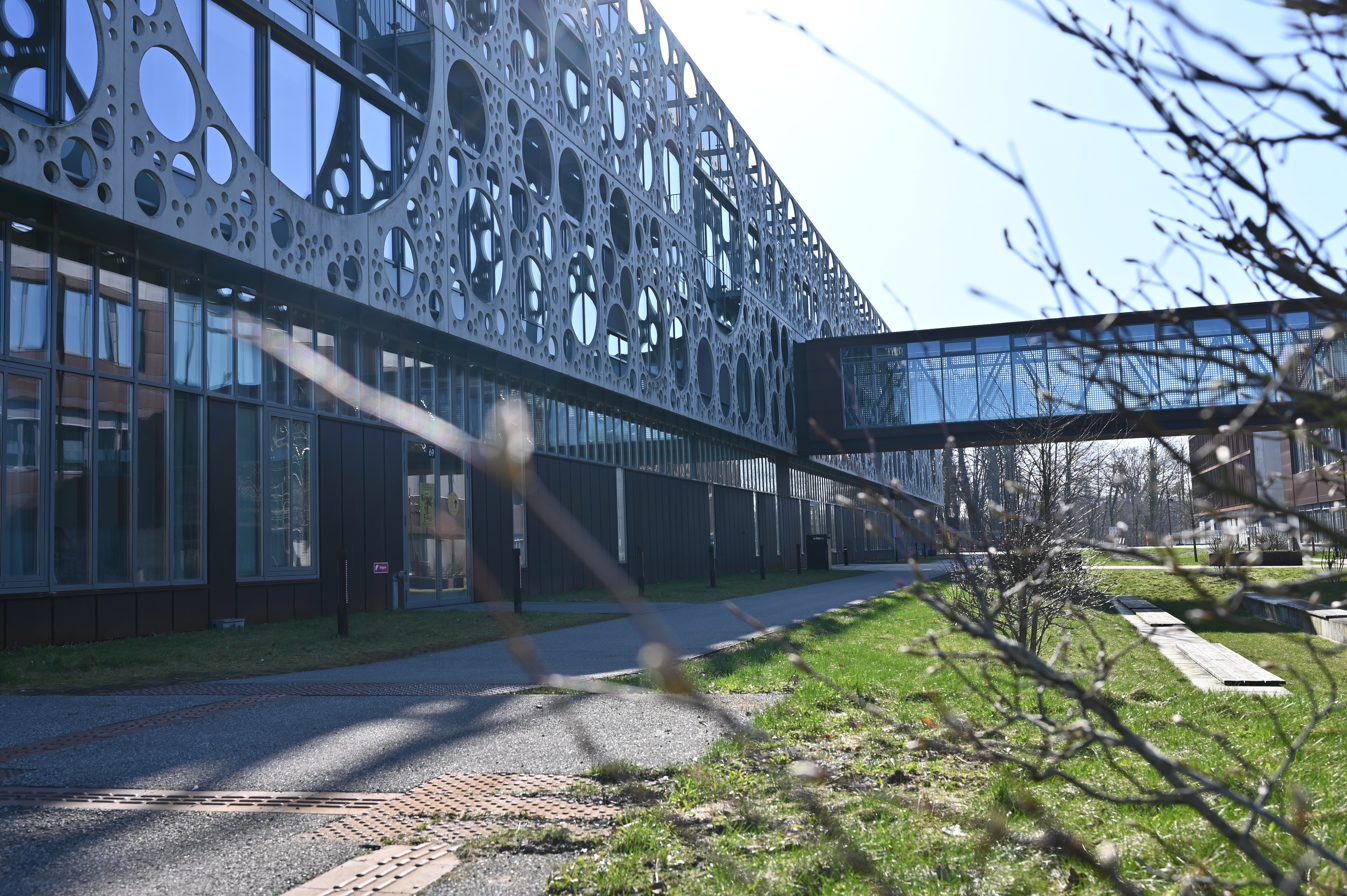
The Faculty of Engineering at the University of Southern Denmark's Odense Campus

The University of Southern Denmark (Syddansk Universitet) was established in 1998 as a merger of Odense University, the Southern Denmark Business School (Handelshøjskole Syd), the Southern Engineering School (Ingeniørhøjskole Syd) and the South Jutland University Centre (Sydjysk Universitetscenter). The main campus is in Odense but there are also departments in Copenhagen, Esbjerg, Kolding, Slagelse and Sønderborg. With some 26,000 students (2012), the establishment is Denmark's third largest university. The Faculty of Engineering (Det Tekniske Fakultet) combines several institutions: Odense Maskinteknikum (a mechanical engineering college which was established in 1905 and in 1962 became the Southern Engineering School), the Mads Clausen Institute and the Mærsk Mc-Kinney Møller Institute.

The Odense campus of the University of Southern Denmark is known to host all faculties and study programs at the same place, contrary to, for instance, University of Copenhagen where the institutes and disciplines have been spread out in the city. This, too, is reflected in the strategy of the university which stresses cross-disciplinary research. In 2024, The University of Southern Denmark campus and Nyt OUH – the new buildings for Odense University Hospital – will be physically connected to promote cooperations between the two institutions. The combined university and hospital will cover 500,000 square meters, making it one of the largest buildings in Europe.

=== Other educational institutions ===
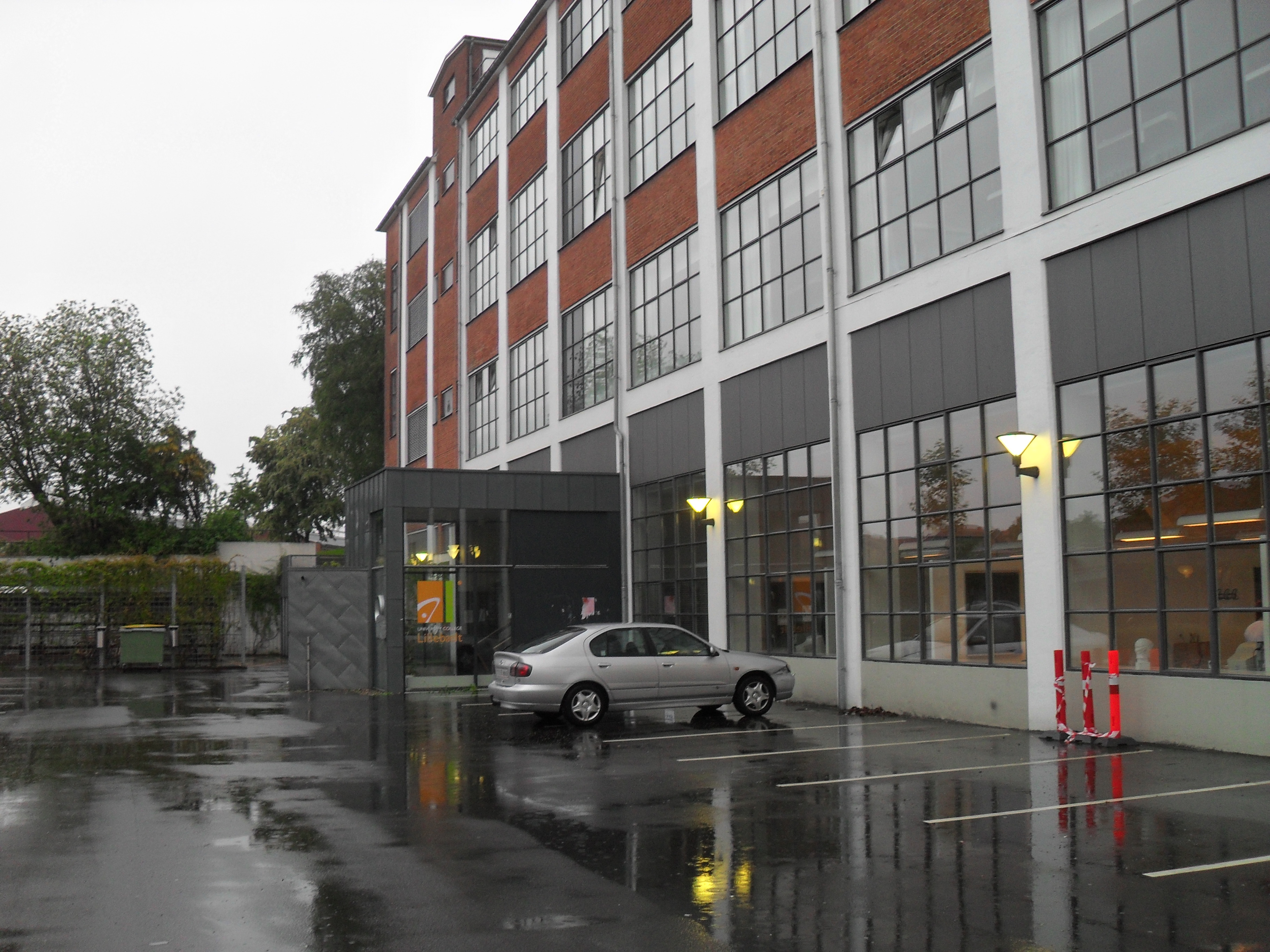
University College Lillebælt, Odense

Odense also includes departments of the UCL University College headquartered in Vejle. The university is the result of a merger between several further education institutions on Funen and in Jelling, Vejle and Svendborg. UCL is currently undertaking comprehensive renovation of the buildings on Niels Bohrs Allé from the 1960s where it will concentrate its Odense interests. It intends to open University College Lillebælt Campus Odense in August 2014.

Aimed at improving employment opportunities in business, the Lillebaelt Academy of Professional Higher Education (Erhvervsakademiet Lillebælt) was established in 2009 as a result of a merger between Tietgen Business College, SDE college, Kold College and Vejle Business College. In 2014, it had 3,200 students and a staff of 300. Its programmes are offered at various locations in Odense and Vejle. Under the auspices of the municipality, the Odense School of Music (Odense Musikskole) offers educational courses with an emphasis on music to children and young people up to the age of 25.

Kold College is a privately run institution offering vocational courses in food, agriculture and gardening. Founded in 2004, after a merger between Datum Tekniske Skole and Gartnerskolen Søhus, it changed its name to Kold College in 2008. It also offers secondary education courses in the natural sciences. The college is named after Christen Kold who founded vocational schools on Funen in the mid-19th century.

Funen Art Academy is an independent, nationally recognized educational institution centrally located at the premises of Odense's first museum and former Funen Museum of Art. The academy offers a 5-year course in the visual arts, as well as various exhibitions, workshops, and artist talks.

Odense is home to eight gymnasiums (Grammar schools), 21 state grade schools as well as a number of private schools.

== Sports ==
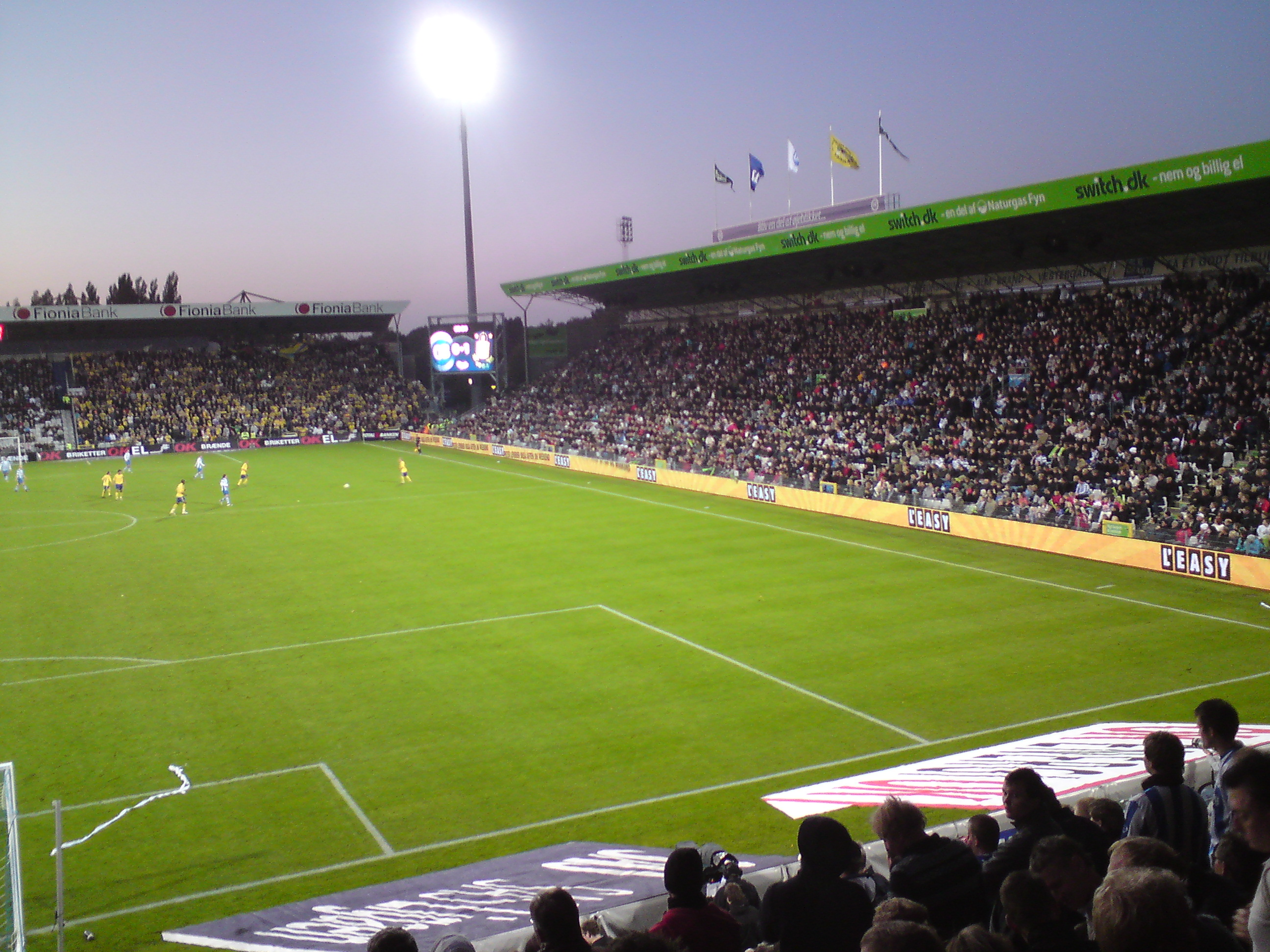
Odense Stadium during a Superliga game between Odense Boldklub and Brøndby IF in 2008.

Odense's most important football clubs are Odense Boldklub (OB), BK Marienlyst (BM), B1909, and B1913. OB has a history going back to 1887 when it was founded as Odense Kricketklub (Odense Cricket Club). It changed its name to Odense Boldklub in 1893 after football was included in its activities. The club has won three national championships, and five cup titles. The club play their home matches at Odense Stadium, also known as Odense Stadion. BK Marienlyst, founded in 1922, are in the Danish 2nd Division, and play their home matches at Marienlystcentret, which has a capacity of 1,200. The club also has a notable volleyball team. RC Odense represents the city at rugby in combination with Lindø RSC.

The Odense Bulldogs are a professional ice hockey team based in Odense. They play in the top Danish League Metal Ligaen, as the only team from Funen. In tennis, Tennis Club Odense is located near the Odense River. The country's largest tennis centre is due to open in Marienlyst in 2014.

The H.C. Andersen Marathon is held annually in Odense. On Ascension Sunday, the locals participate in Eventyrløbet (the Fairy Tale Run) with circuits from 2.5 to 10 km. There are many smaller sports clubs in Odense covering athletics, badminton, basketball, boxing, climbing, cycling, rowing, fencing, football, golf, gymnastics, handball, jujitsu, karate, riding, roller-skating, shooting, swimming, table tennis, tennis, volleyball, yoga and wrestling as well as several specialising in facilities for people with disabilities.

=== Esports ===
In early December 2017, the ESL Pro League Season 6 finals were held in the 4,000-seat Arena Fyn. The event would return to Odense for its Season 8 finals, won by the hometown heroes Astralis, in December 2018. The season 10 offline finals of ESL Pro League were also held in the city.

== Transport ==
=== Boat ===
The Port of Odense consists of three main basins and a number of facilities along the canal, with quays measuring roughly 4,200 metres (13,800 ft) in length in total. Vessels up to a length of 160 metres (520 ft) and a draft of 6.8 metres (22 ft) are facilitated in the port. The wharf for tankers is situated outside the harbour on the southern side of the canal, with facilities for tankers, general cargo ships, bulk, and LPG ships, and has a depth of 7.5 metres (25 ft).

=== Great Belt Bridge ===
Accessibility to Odense was greatly increased when the ferry service between the two main Danish islands, Zealand and Funen, was replaced by the Great Belt Bridge – opened for rail traffic in 1997, for road traffic in 1998. When the bridge opened, it was the second longest suspension bridge in the world. Aarhus can be reached by train in 1 hour and 33 minutes while, thanks to the Great Belt Bridge, trains to Copenhagen can take as little as an hour and a quarter.

=== Rail, bus and tram ===
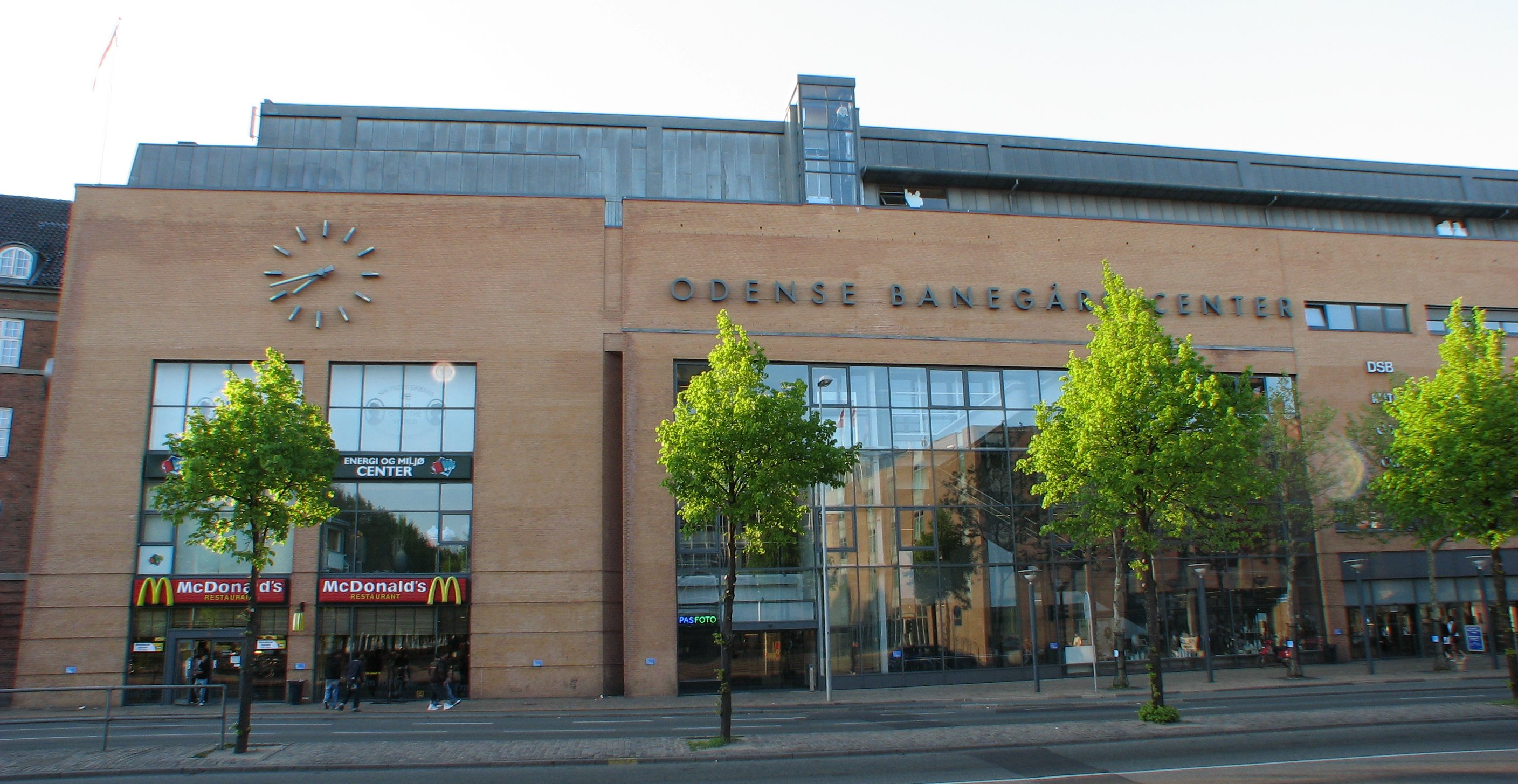
Odense Station

Odense's main railway station Odense Station lies on the railway line between Copenhagen and Jutland, Denmark's peninsular mainland. International trains connect the town with Hamburg in Germany. Local and regional trains link Odense to the rest of Denmark. A separate passenger railway line, Svendborgbanen, operates between Odense and Svendborg. Formerly, railways connected Odense to most of Funen's coastal cities, but these links were closed down in the 1950s and 1960s. Today, these regional routes are served by buses operated by the public company FynBus, which also operates the town's municipal bus service, connecting the town's suburbs to the city centre. On 28 May 2022, Odense's new tram line entered service. A 14.5 km double-track line runs from Tarup in the northwest to the station, Syddansk Universitet, a hospital, and Hjallese in the south, with 26 stops. Possible extensions are under consideration.

=== Road ===
By road, Odense connects to Zealand and Jutland with the Funen Motorway (Fynske Motorvej), a section of the E20, and to Svendborg on the southern part of Funen by way of the Svendborg Motorway (Svendborgmotorvejen), which comprises the Danish national road 9. Other, smaller routes connect Odense to the rest of Funen, with direct links to all coastal towns.

In 2015 plannings were established on Denmark's first diverging diamond interchange (DDI), called "Dynamisk Ruderanlæg", upgrading the diamond interchange number 52 on Fynske Motorvej (E20), crossing the roadways of Assensvej by following the American design of DDIs at 55.361287°N 10.344932°E On 17 September 2017, the redesigned interchange opened for traffic. Computer aided simulation and land usage resulted the DDI as the adequate solution.

=== Air ===
Odense is served by Odense Airport, which operates flights to tourist resorts, mainly in the summer months.

=== Cycling Initiatives in Odense ===
In 2016, the city of Odense, Denmark implemented a new form of technology to allow for more efficient bike travel. Often, when it is raining heavily, cyclists have had to sit in the rain for long periods of time at traffic lights, and this disincentives them to cycle to work that day. To fix this problem, Odense has placed rain sensors in traffic lights along their super bike highways. These sensors interact with motion detectors which "allow the system to register when bikes are within 70 meters of the intersection." They then automatically prolong the green light. The intersection includes a small sign that explains the system to the cyclists, and when a light goes on, they can see the system is functioning. This technology allows cyclists to experience up to 20 seconds longer of green light, and makes their overall journey more efficient, safer, and dryer.

The Cycling Embassy of Denmark is the organization spearheading this research and initiatives. While there is not much criticism due to the cycling culture that is already fairly prevalent in Odense, those who commute in cars would be naturally upset by the longer red lights. However, the embassy believes that there should not be too much pushback because of the equity issue involved with being exposed to the rain versus being sheltered in a car. It will also only be utilized up to 3 times a month.

This initiative does not only optimize the corridor flow and speed for cyclists, but reinforces the "green wave". The green wave is known as the ability to cycle through several intersections without having to stop. This is the overall thought the Cycling Embassy had in installing rain sensors, as they hope to implement the technology in other intersections of the city, creating an efficient city-wide system of sustainable transit. Eventually, riding a bike will be easier than riding a car.

== Healthcare ==
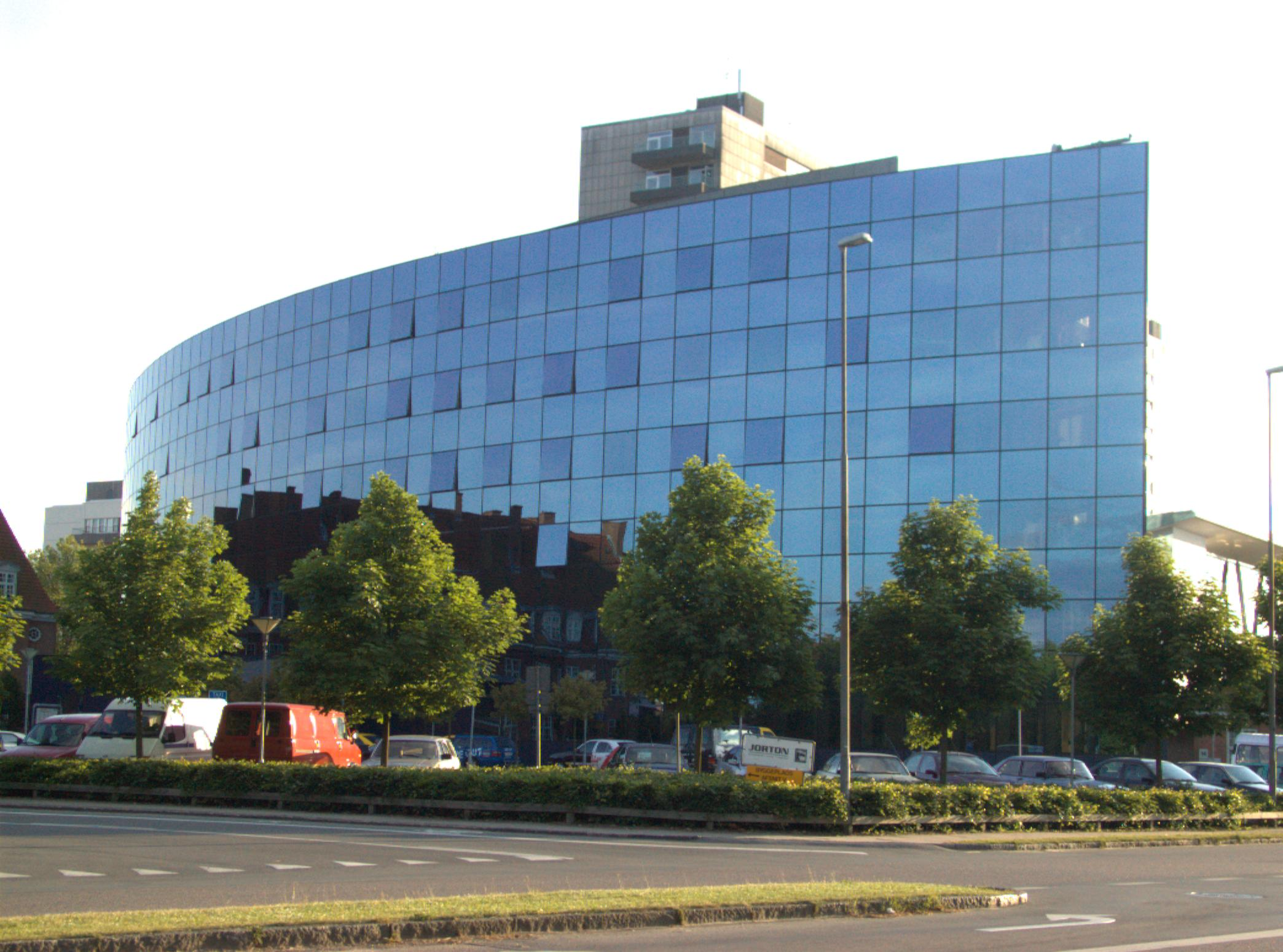
Odense University Hospital

The Odense University Hospital (OUH), established in 1912, is of major regional importance, not only for healthcare, but for conducting research in collaboration with the Institute of Clinical Research of the University of Southern Denmark. OUH is the largest hospital unit in Denmark and the largest employer in Odense, and as of 2006 it had 1200 beds and a staff of 7700 people, of which 1300 people were doctors. Today there are about 10,000 employees covering all fields of medicine. The hospital tower block is 57 metres (187 ft) high, has 15 floors and is Odense's tallest building. It is the principal hospital for the northern part of Funen but also takes patients from all over Denmark, as it has highly specialized units within hand replantation surgery and special neuro-radiological intervention.

The Hans Christian Andersen Children's Hospital, part of the OUH, is the only paediatric department on the island of Funen, and also conducts research into nutrition and gastrointestinal diseases, asthma and allergies, hormonal diseases and others. As of 2013, the children's hospital had consisted of seven wards and had 377 employees, with about 10,000 admissions and 25,000 annual outpatient visits annually. A new DKK 6.3 billion hospital is under construction in closer proximity to the University of Southern Denmark, scheduled to be completed in 2018. The hospital will have a floor area of 212,000 square metres (2,280,000 sq ft).

Odense is home to several other private hospitals, including Privathospitalet H. C. Andersen Klinikken, Privathospitalet Hunderup, and Privathospitalet Mariahjemmet.

== Media ==
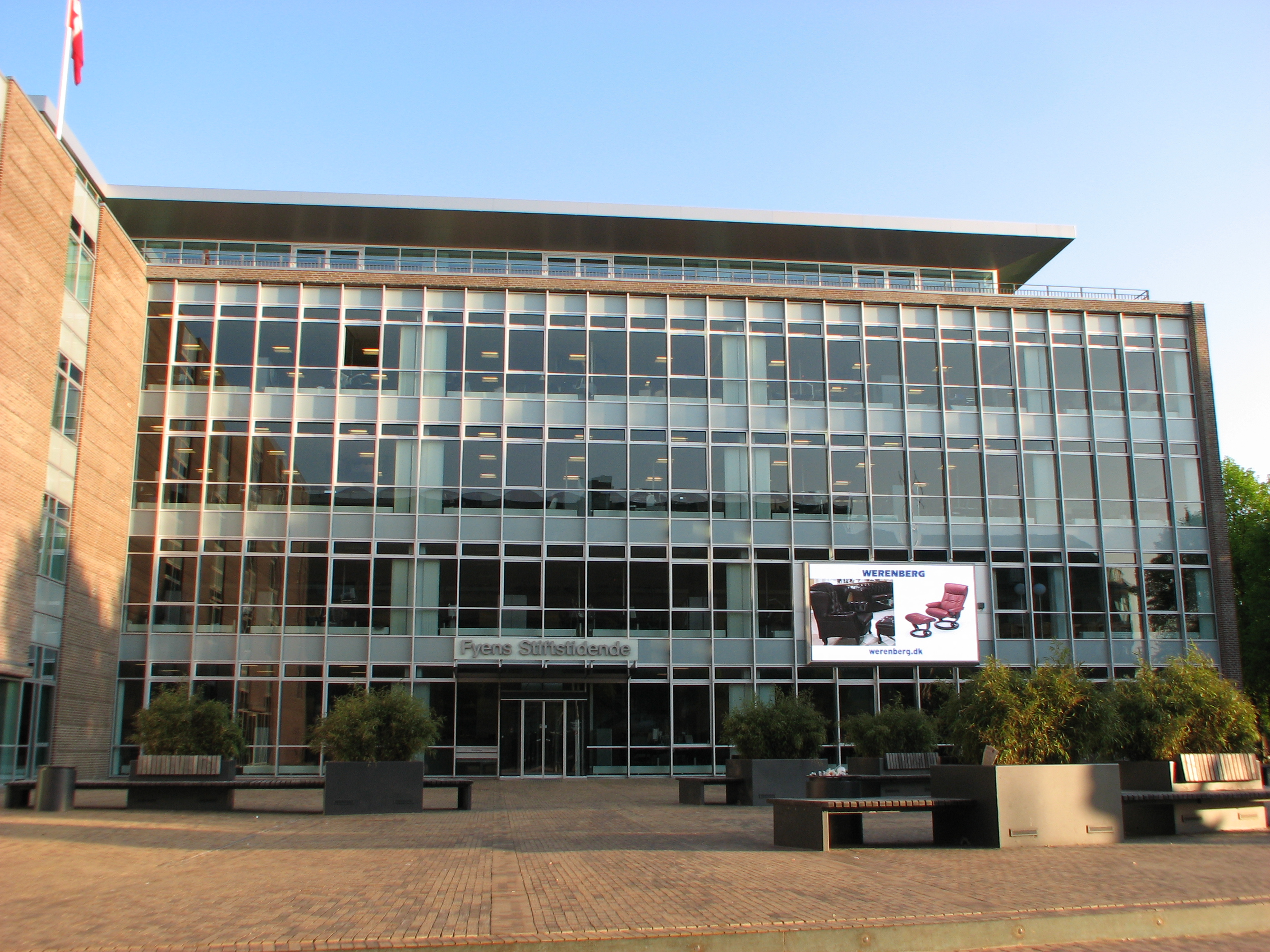
The publishing house of Fyens Stiftstidende

Odense is the centre for media activity on Funen, and the hub of the regional network. Its principal newspaper is Fyens Stiftstidende, a daily broadsheet owned by Den Fynske Bladfond and published by Fyens Stiftstidende A/S, which was established on 3 January 1772. Until 1841 the newspaper was known as Kongelig Priviligerede Odense Adresse-Contoirs Efterretninger, and on 13 April 1993 the newspaper changed its 221-year-old tradition as a midday newspaper, to a morning paper. In 2013, it had an average circulation of 47,738, down from some 60,500 in 2005. The editor in chief, Per Westergård, chairs the board of the Centre for Journalism at the University of Southern Denmark, one of the two university journalism departments in Denmark. Denmark's largest university press, the University Press of Southern Denmark, is also based in Odense. It was founded in 1966 as Odense University Press (Odense Universitetsforlag), and its authors are mainly academics from the University of Southern Denmark.

The television station TV 2, fully owned by the state since 2003, is based in Odense. The station began broadcasting on 1 October 1988 as a privately owned company, thereby ending the television monopoly previously exercised by the Danmarks Radio (DR). Since 2007, TV 2 has had about 1,000 employees. Now operating six channels, TV 2 now broadcasts over 40,000 hours of television programmes per year.

== Notable residents ==
- Note: Place of birth is shown for notables born in the wider Odense Municipality

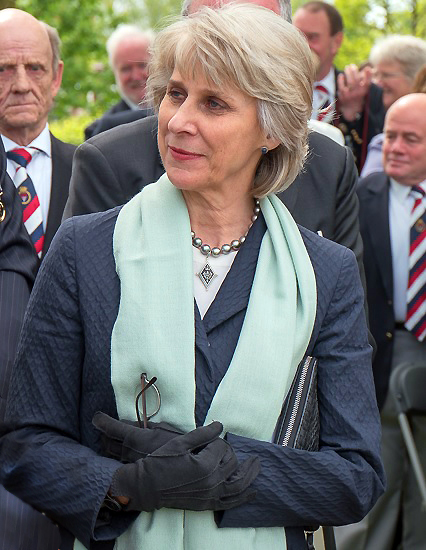
Birgitte, Duchess of Gloucester, 2015

=== Nobility ===
- Canute IV of Denmark (c. 1042 – 1086), also known as Canute the Saint and Canute the Holy
- Charles I, Count of Flanders (1084–1127), also known as Charles the Good, son of Canute IV of Denmark
- Ludvig Rosenkrantz (1628–1685), noble, military officer and land owner; settled in Norway
- Birgitte, Duchess of Gloucester (born 1946), wife of Prince Richard, Duke of Gloucester, a first cousin of Queen Elizabeth II.

=== Public thought and politics ===
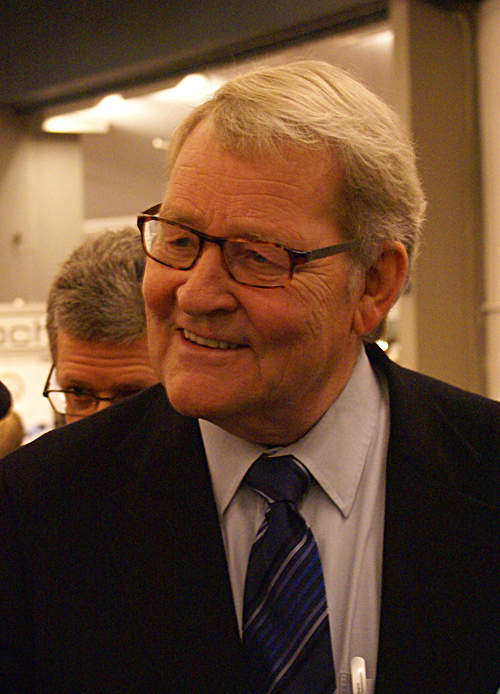
Niels Helveg Petersen, 2008

- Jørgen Sadolin (c. 1490–1559), Danish reformer
- Frants Berg (1504–1591), clergyman, rector in Odense 1581, Bishop of Oslo in 1548–1580
- Jacob B. Winslow (1669–1760), Danish-French anatomist
- Ida Falbe-Hansen (1849–1922), educator, philologist and women's activist
- Louise Winteler (1834–1926), headmistress, founder of the Louise Winteler girls school
- Anna Lohse (1866–1942), teacher and women's rights activist
- Lise Østergaard (1924–1996), psychologist and politician
- Niels Helveg Petersen (1939–2017), politician
- Bendt Bendtsen (born 1954), politician and MEP in 2009–2019
- Lars Christian Lilleholt (born 1965), politician, former Minister of Energy, Utilities and Climate
- Jeanette Varberg (born 1978), archaeologist, curator at the National Museum of Denmark

=== Arts ===
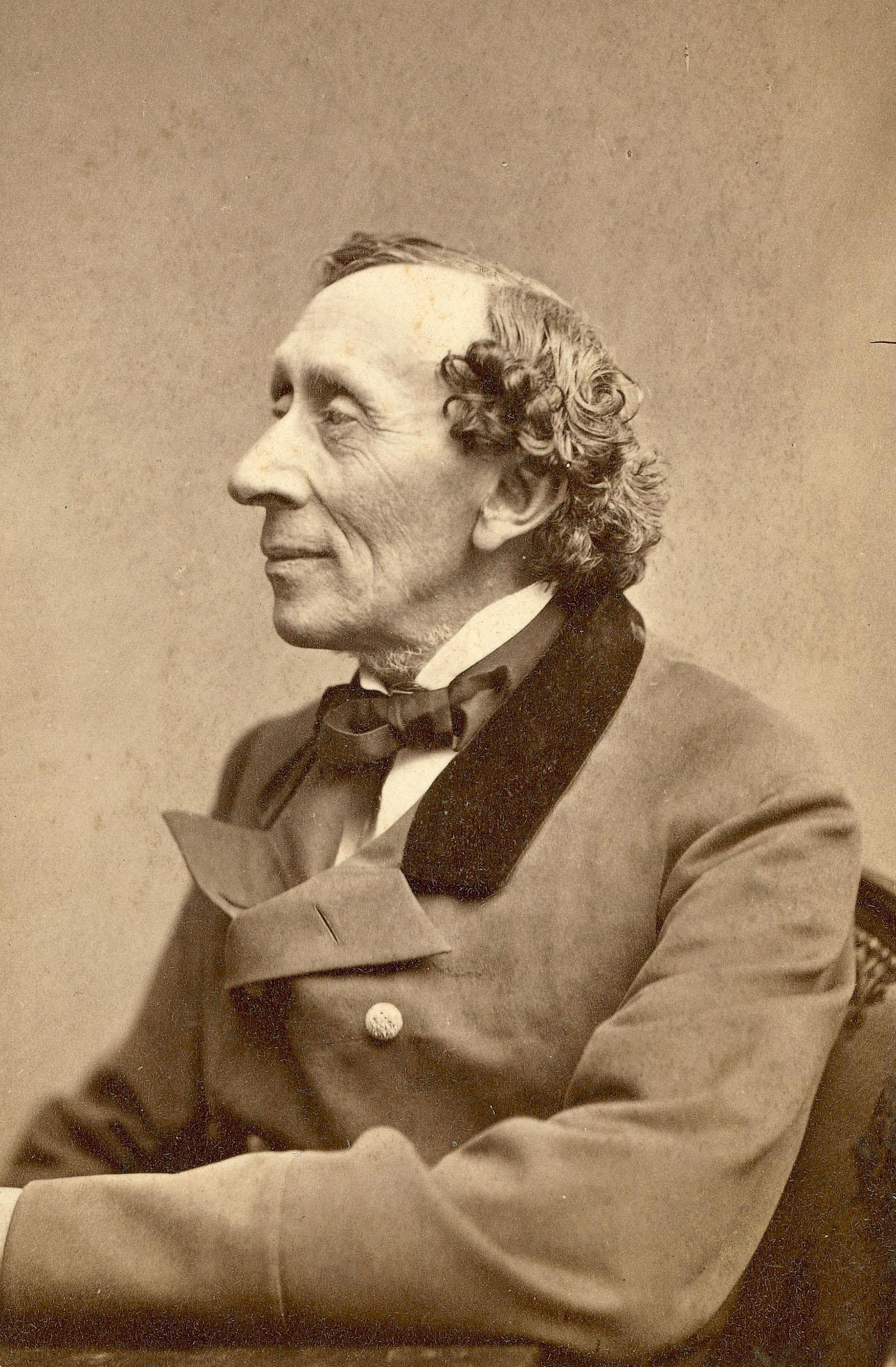
HC Andersen, 1869

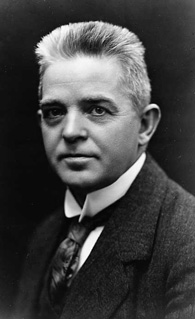
Carl Nielsen, 1910

- Johan Frederik Schultz (1756–1817), book printer and publisher
- Wilhelm Bendz (1804–1832), painter of genre works and portraits
- Hans Christian Andersen (1805–1875), novelist, poet, fairy tale and short story writer
- Carl Frederik Aagaard (1833–1895), landscape painter and decorative artist
- Julius Paulsen (1860–1940), painter
- Carl Nielsen (1865 in Sortelung – 1931), composer, musician, conductor and violinist
- Holger Jacobsen (1876–1960), architect
- Bodil Kjer (1917–2003), actress
- Dagmar Orlamundt (1863–1939), actress
- Ove Sprogøe (1919–2004), actor
- Morten Grunwald (1934–2018), actor, stage director and theatre manager
- Kim Larsen (1945–2018), rock and pop musician
- Jens Galschiøt (born 1954), sculptor; moved to Odense in 1973
- Ulrich Thomsen (born 1963 in Næsby), actor
- Claes Bang (born 1967), actor and musician
- Trine Dyrholm (born 1972), actress, singer and songwriter
- Roland Møller (born 1972), actor
- Johan Kobborg (born 1972), ballet dancer, choreographer, director and visual artist
- MØ (born 1988 in Ubberud), singer-songwriter

=== Business ===
- Erich Erichsen (1752–1837), merchant and ship-owner
- Johan Frederik Schultz (1756–1817), book printer and publisher
- Carl Frederik Tietgen (1829–1901), industrialist, financier and banker
- Niels Jacobsen (1865–1935), architect and politician, Chairman of The Lego Group, worked and died in Odense
- Kurt Østervig (1912–1986), furniture designer

=== Sport ===
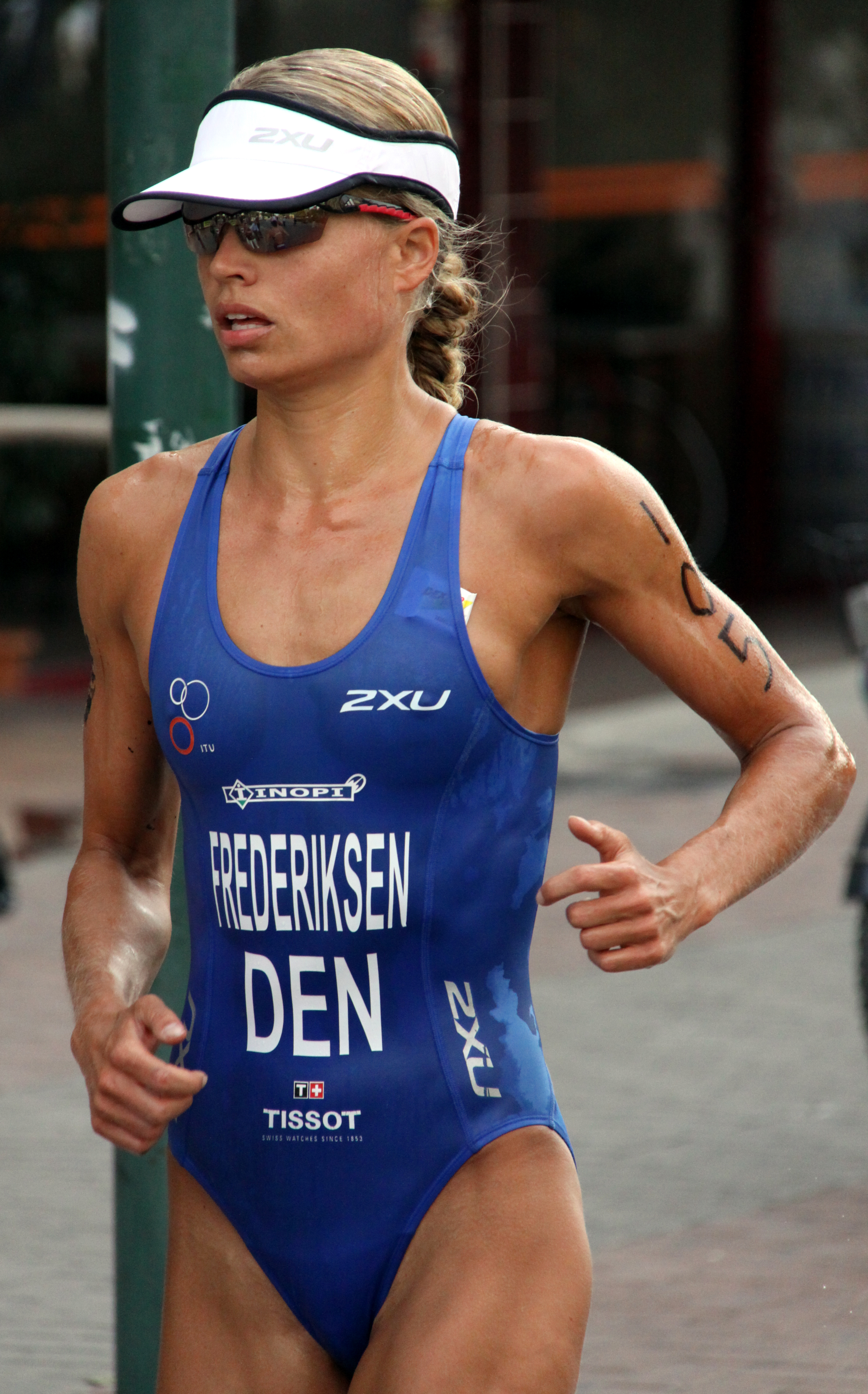
Helle Frederiksen, 2009

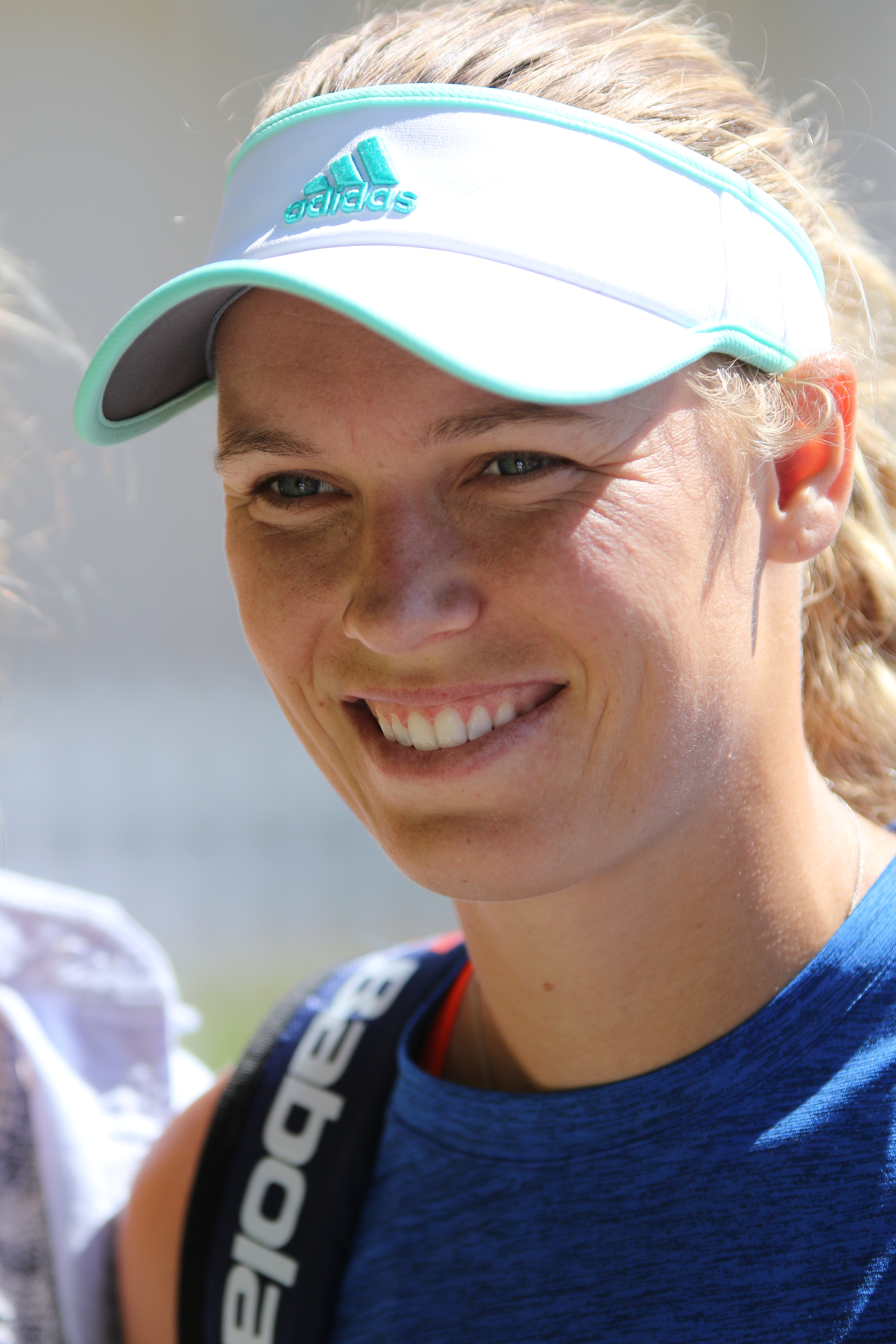
Caroline Wozniacki, 2017

- Edmund Hansen (1900–1995), tandem cyclist, Olympic silver medalist
- Abraham Kurland (1912–1999), wrestler, Olympic silver medalist
- Jytte Hansen (1932–2015), breaststroke swimmer
- Ib Solvang Hansen (1934–1978), professional wrestler
- Richard Møller Nielsen (1937 in Ubberud – 2014), football player and manager
- John Danielsen (born 1939), footballer
- Ole Bjørnmose (1944 in Strib - 2006), footballer
- Lars Høgh (born 1959 - 2021), footballer
- Inger Pors Olsen (born 1966), rower
- Þorvaldur Örlygsson (born 1966), Icelandic footballer
- Anja Andersen (born 1969), handball player and coach, Olympic winner
- Niels Frederiksen (born 1970), football manager
- Thomas Helveg (born 1971), footballer
- Nicki Pedersen (born 1977), motorcycle speedway rider
- Allan Simonsen (1978–2013), racing driver
- Stephan Mølvig (born 1979), rower, Olympic winner
- Lars Jacobsen (born 1979), footballer
- Hans Andersen (born 1980), motorcycle speedway rider
- Helle Frederiksen (born 1981), triathlete
- Frederik Klokker (born 1983), cricketer
- Martin Damsbo (born 1985), compound archery competitor
- Rikke Møller Pedersen (born 1989), breaststroke swimmer, Olympic bronze medalist
- Caroline Wozniacki (born 1990), tennis player
- Viktor Axelsen (born 1994), badminton player, Olympic winner

== Twin towns – sister cities ==
Odense Municipality is twinned with:

- Columbus, United States
- Funabashi, Japan
- Groningen, Netherlands
- Iksan, South Korea
- İzmir, Turkey
- Kaunas, Lithuania
- Kyiv, Ukraine
- Klaksvík, Faroe Islands
- Kópavogur, Iceland
- Norrköping, Sweden
- Östersund, Sweden
- Schwerin, Germany
- Shaoxing, China
- St Albans, England, United Kingdom
- Tampere, Finland
- Trondheim, Norway
- Upernavik (Avannaata), Greenland

== See also ==
- Tourism in Denmark
