= Teater Momentum =

Theatre in Odense

Coordinates: 55°23′35″N 10°22′53″E

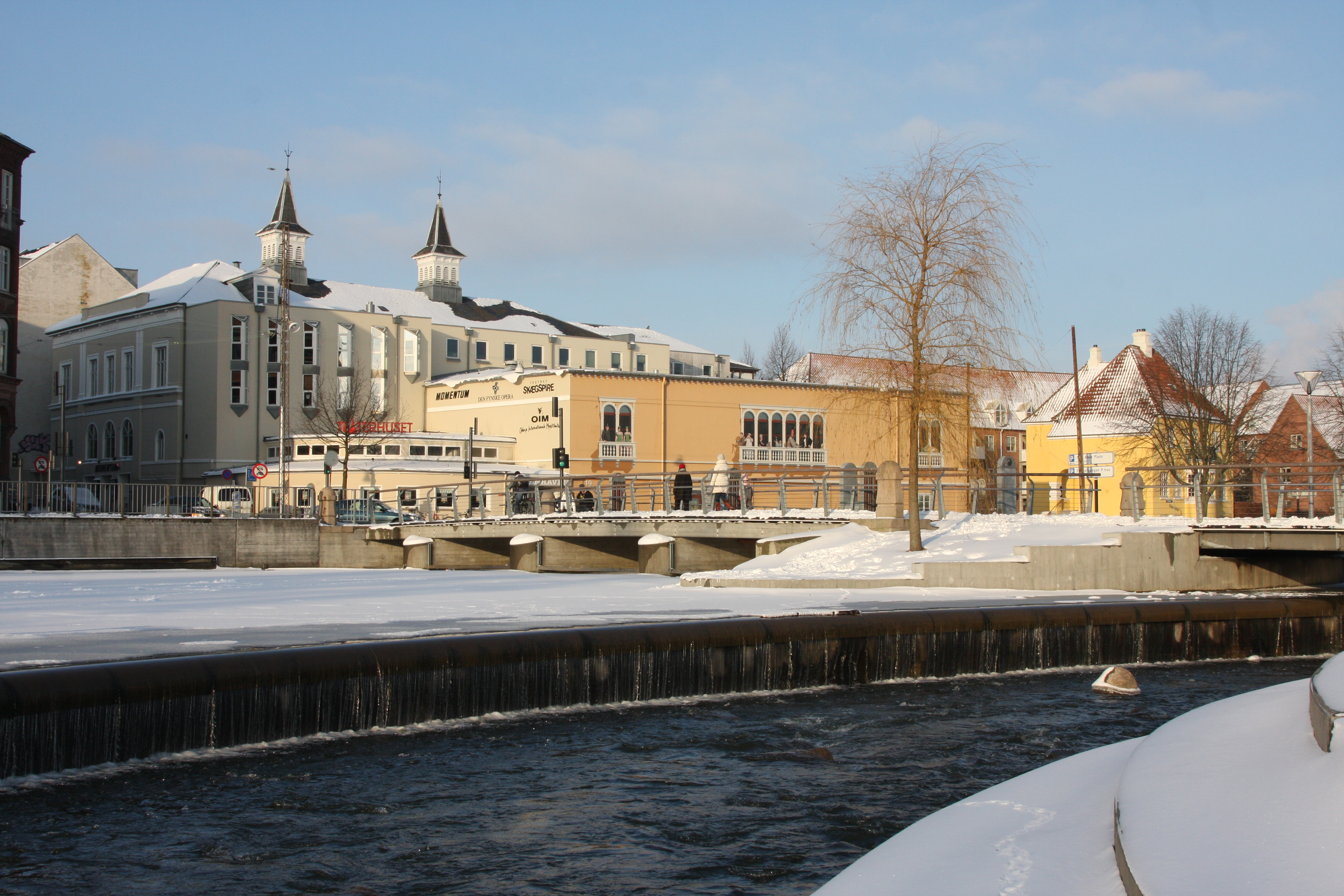
Teater Momentum, with Odense River in the foreground

Teater Momentum is a small theatre in Odense, Denmark.

Its location is at Ny Vestergade 18. The theatre itself was established in 2005 and it only features shows which are under the branch of modern drama. Teater Momentum receives public funding from the municipality of Odense and the Ministry of Cultural Affairs.

The structure of the theatre is special as every season is different from the preceding one. Every new season, a new team of actors and an artistic director will take over the production of the plays shown at the theatre. Furthermore, the ensemble have to fulfill some goals set forth by the theatre's Artistic Committee. This type of theatre was established with the season of 2007/2008 called Volume 1.

== Volume 1 ==
This season ran from 2007/2008 and the artistic director for this season was Moqi Simon Trolin. The actors he had at his disposal were: Jesper Riefensthal, Ernesto Piga Carbone, Marie Vestergård Jacobsen and Iben Dorner; their partnership resulted in three shows where the main theme in the first was solidarity, the next was about the company in general and the last performance was about fear. All of the three shows were related to Odense.

== Volume 2 ==
Kamilla Bach Mortensen was the artistic director of season 2008/2009 and for the task ahead the actors Gry Guldager Jensen, Jakob Bjerregaard Engmann og Mikkel Løvenholt Reenberg helped her fulfill her goal. The three performances of the season contained the themes of friendship, a Christmas cabaret/musical which had to feature forbidden love and the last one had to be authored by a foreigner who does not live in Denmark. To find the last play, Teater Momentum arranged an international competition where the winner was the prize winning Norwegian author Arne Lygre. However, the play was written for four persons so Mia Lerdam was added to the team as the fourth member.

== Volume 3 ==
The season of 2009/10 had Daniel Rylander as the artistic director. The goal of the season was to get under the skin of the single-family house's wrong sides. The opening spectacle of the season was 'Historien om hvordan man slår sin familie ihjel' (The Story About How To Kill Your Family), a chamber play about the suppressed feelings of family relations - a free interpretation of the strindberg-classic "Pelikanen" (The Pelican). The Christmas spectacle 'The Perfect Christmas' was inspired by the perfect house wife, and British TV-personality, Anthea Turners's book with the same name. 'Valkyrien' (The Valkyrie) was the last spectacle of the season, written by Line Mørkeby as a 'gesamtkunstwerk' with clear references to Wagner. Vol. 3 artistic ensemble: Artistic director: Daniel Rylander. Actors: Nanna Bøttcher, Jakob Hannibal og Christina Bech.

== Volume 4 ==
The artistic director of the 4th season (2010/2011) was Anne Zacho Søgaard. The season opened with the musical 'Lad mig dø i faldet fra en barstol' (Let med die i the fall from a bar stool) and was based on live stories from the bodega environment in Odense and contained new songs written by Tobias Trier. The following spectacle was 'Voksne kan ikke blive bange' (Adults cannot be scared) written by playwright Julie Maj Jakobsen. The fears of children and young people was a central theme in the spectacle which also dealt with school shootings, bullying, the difficult youth love and the, at times, very strained relationships between young people and their parents. Vol. 4 artistic ensemble: Artistic director: Anne Zacho Søgaard. Actors: Mille Maria Dalsgaard, Mogens Rex and Johannes Lilleøre. Composer: Tobias Trier. Playwright: Julie Maj Jakobsen

== Volume 5 ==
The season of 2011/12 had two artistic directors, Caroline McSweeny and Jens August Wille. The first spectacle 'Vejen til Gudvedhvor' (The road to Godknowswhere) with the subtitle "a silent roadmovie" themed breakdowns in different levels: A physical car crash and, in a more metaphorical context, different kinds of societal collapses of values - the spectacle was only allowed to use 20 words. The Second spectacle, 'Easylove Laboratoriet' (The Easy Love Laboratory) was based on the book of Emma Gad called "Takt og Tone". The third spectacle was called 'DK Ultra' and had to consist of 10 episodes based on the 'Jantelovsbud' (the Jante law commandments) that originates from the novel "En flygtning krydser sit spor" (A fugitive crosses his path) by Aksel Sandemose. Vol. 5 artistic ensemble: Artistic directors: Caroline McSweeny and Jens August Wille. Actor: Jonas Littauer, Nanna Schaumburg-Müller, Lisbeth Sonne and Michael Grønnemose.

== Volume 6 ==
The 6th season had Lydia Bunk as artistic director and the theme of the three spectacles was 'outsidere' (outsiders). The first one, 'BEAT - en teaterkoncert' (BEAT- a theatre concert), was based on the beat-generation's most central characters: Jack Kerouac, William S. Burroughs and Allen Ginsberg. For this spectacle Peter Kohlmetz Møller composed about 15 new music numbers based on the texts from the beat-generation's aforementioned writers. The second spectacle, 'Affæren' (The Affaire) was a classical comedy of mistaken identity based on Eugène Labiche's L'Affaire de la Rue de Lourcine. The spectacle gave, with men in women's clothes and moral hangovers, the comic frame for Momentum's Christmas show. The third and last spectacle of the season was 'IB3N'. This was a 3-in-1 classic - a mix of the three Henrik Ibsen plays: Fruen fra Havet (The Mrs. From The Ocean), Hedda Gabler and Vildmanden (The Wild Man). 'IB3N' became a multi plot mash-up that dealt with Ibsen's distinctive outsider characters and the questions, the destiny leaves us with when we live our lives. Vol. 6 artistic ensemble: Artistic leader: Lydia Bunk. Actors: Johanne Dal-Lewkovitch, Bjarne Antonisen, Kasper Ørum, Morten Christensen, Mads Hjulmand (IB3N), Tanya Lund Andersen (IB3N) and Pil Nielsen (IB3N). Composer: Peter Kohlmetz Møller. Scenography: Nadia Nabil Korsbæk.

== Volume 7 ==
The 7th season had Rasmus Ask as artistic director. The theme of the season was movies and how people act under pressure. The first spectacle, 'Gæld' (Debt) was based on the theatre genre heist and questioned the system, among other things. The second spectacle 'Brudevals' (Wedding Waltz) worked with the zombie genre and was also the Christmas show of the year. The last spectacle was 'Komme dit rige' (Thy Kingdom Come) where the audience was brought into space like a true science fiction. Vol. 7 artistic ensemble: Artistic director: Rasmus Ask. Actors: Steffen Nielsen, Christine Sønderris and Maria La Cour. Audio design: Ditlev Brinth. Scenography: Peter Schultz.

== Volume 8 ==
This season has Erik Pold as artistic director and the theme is Super Market. The first Spectacle 'Fiaskomonologerne' (The Failure Monologues) is about three characters who, for one reason or another, are a failure. They have failed with an important project, have gone bankrupt or perhaps even gone to the dogs. The spectacle takes place in three different locations in the center of Odense. The other spectacle, 'Teater til salg' (Theatre For Sale) is this year's Christmas show. Bubbling total theater about a group of real-estate agents who invites the audience into an open-house-event at Theatre Momentum that have been put up for sale. The last spectacle, 'Diamonds and Secrets' is a docudrama that bases itself on anthropological studies and actual events. The spectacle is, among other things, dealing with: International development programs, child soldiers, blood diamonds (conflict diamonds), prostitution, Secret Societies and what we in the West do to hold on to our privileges. Vol. 8 artistic ensemble: Artistic director: Erik Pold. Actors: Marie Nørgaard, Magnus Bruun and Troels Hagen Findsen. Playwright: Tomas Lagermand Lundme, Karsten Johansen (Diamonds and Secrets) and Erik Pold (Diamonds and Secrets). Video design: Helle Lyshøj (Teater til salg and Diamonds and Secrets). Scenography: Sille Dons Heltoft (Teater til salg). Lightning design: Kasper Dauberg. Composer: Rumpistol/Jens B. Christiansen.

== Volume 9 ==
In season 9 Jacob Stage will be the artistic director of Teater Momentum.

== Teater Momentum: Not just a theatre ==
Other activities at Teater Momentum include Momentum Weekend, where such things as bands and poetry slam take the stage.

== Other information ==
Christian Eiming was hired by Teater Momentum in September 2008. Among other things he has an education as a dramaturgist at the University of Aarhus.

Teater Momentum's Board of Directors:

- Lasse Bo Handberg, director of Baggaardsteatret in Svendborg
- Lasse Tajmer, cultural executive at Tobaksgaarden in Assens
- Henrik Dresbøll, contact manager at Cosmographic
- Christoffer Berdal, theatre director
- Lars Kaalund, actor and instructor
