= Tennis Club Odense =

Danish sporting club

Tennis Club Odense is a Danish sporting club in Odense, Denmark. Founded in 1889 as part of Odense Boldklub, Tennis Club Odense is the oldest tennis club on the Danish island Funen. In 1996, the club withdrew from Odense Boldklub and founded the independent tennis club, operating under its current name since 2007.

Tennis Club Odense is a member of Funen Tennis Association (FTU) and the Danish Tennis Association (DTF), the governing bodies of Funen and Danish lawn tennis, respectively. It has 13 outdoor courts (12 of which are clay courts), but despite being the largest tennis club in Denmark's third largest city, it has had no permanent indoor courts since 2004. Since 2007, however, members of Tennis Club Odense have played indoor tennis in the club's temporary facilities in a local warehouse. Nonetheless, the local authorities have promised building six indoor courts before 2014.

Internationally, the club has hosted the annual ITF Junior Outdoor Cup Odense since 2010, and throughout the 1990s, the club also hosted Funen Open, a major tournament on the ITF Men's Circuit. In 2008, Tennis Club Odense played a major role in organizing of the 2008 Nordea Danish Open – the forerunner for the annual Danish WTA tournament in Copenhagen, Denmark.

Despite being born in Odense, the former world no. 1 on the WTA Tour, Caroline Wozniacki, has never played for or in Tennis Club Odense. Nevertheless, the most successful Danish male tennis player of the 2000s, Kristian Pless, started his career in the club. On a national level, Tennis Club Odense is one of the most successful Danish tennis clubs, winning the bronze medal at the Danish Team Championship in 2009.

== History ==
Tennis Club Odense is the oldest tennis club on Funen. In 1894, the first permanent clay courts were placed near Munke Mose, a local swamp in Odense. In 1933, the construction of indoor facilities was finished, but ten years later, the facilities burned down. There was not found a replacement until 1964. Although the new indoor facilities were quickly considered obsolete, the two indoor courts surrounded by a primitive plastic cloth were in operation until 2004, when they were completely worn down.

In 1996, the tennis department decided to withdraw from Odense Boldklub (OB), one of the most successful Danish football clubs of all time. The departure was seen as a reaction to the primitive indoor facilities and the fact that the club had little ability in attracting its own sponsors. From 1996 to 2006, the tennis club was known as OB Tennis.

Tennis Team Fyn, an extensive talent development project, was launched in 2004 by Tennis Club Odense and other local partners in order to generate more talented young tennis players on Funen.

In 2007, the tennis club changed its name to Tennis Club Odense.

== See also ==
- Odense Boldklub
