= Nordfyn Municipality =

Nordfyn Municipality Nordfyns Kommune (Danish)
- Municipality
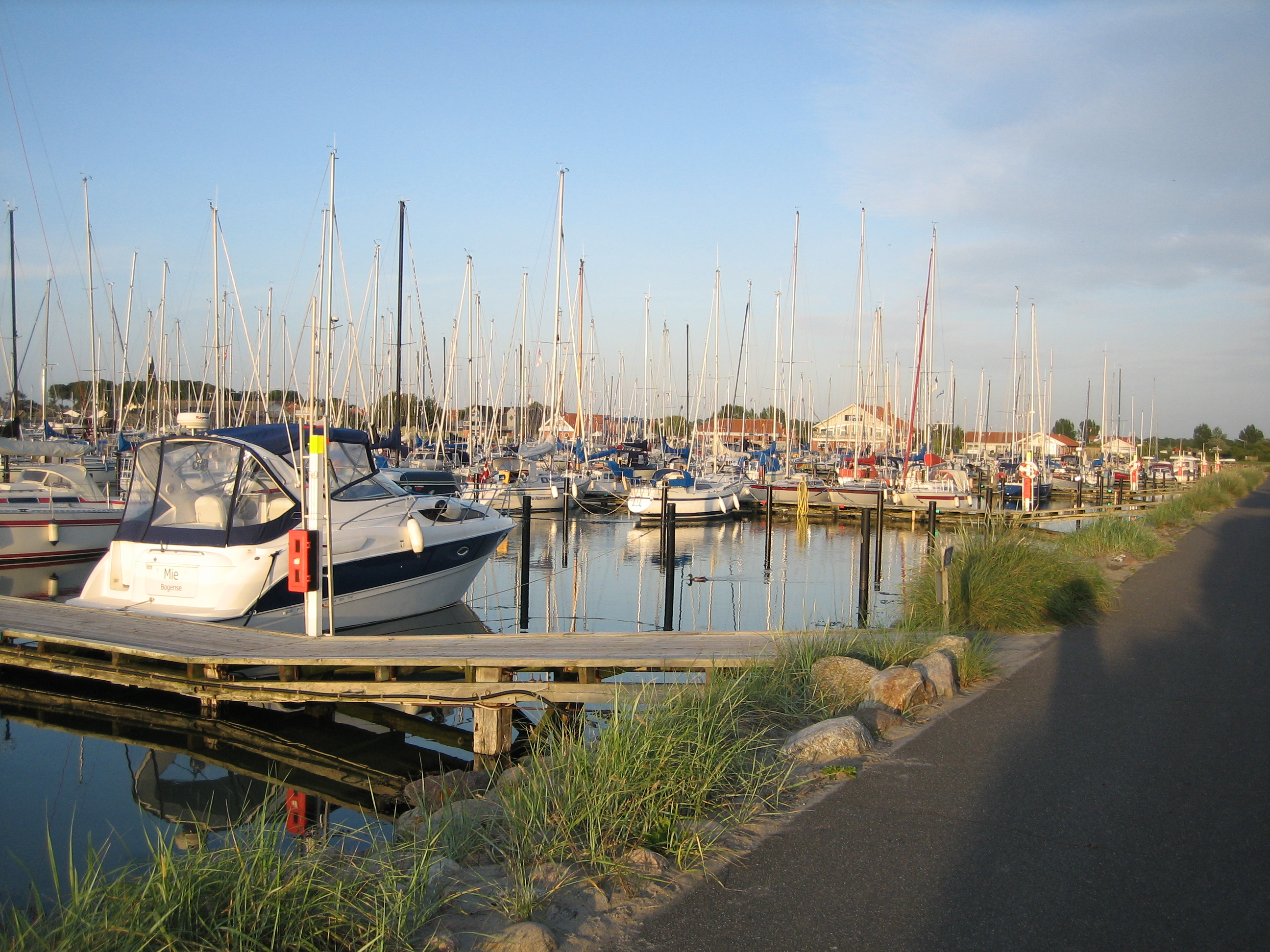
- Bogense Marina

- Coat of arms

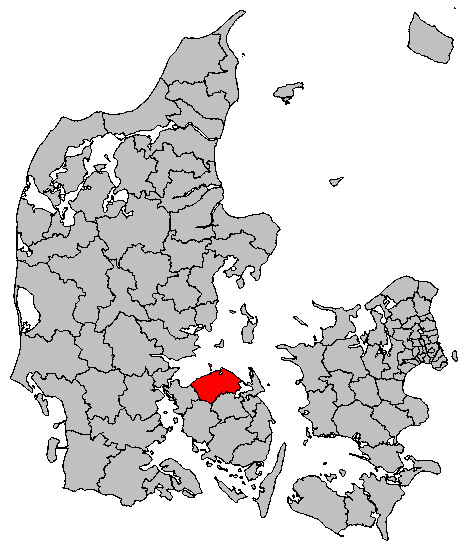
- Coordinates: 55°31′20″N 10°13′20″E
- Country: Denmark
- Region: Southern Denmark
- Established: January 1, 2007
- Seat: Bogense

Government
  - Mayor: Mette Landtved-Holm (V)

Area
  - Total: 452.30 km^{2} (174.63 sq mi)

Population (1 January 2026)
  - Total: 29,179
  - Density: 64.512/km^{2} (167.09/sq mi)
- Time zone: UTC1 (CET)
  - Summer (DST): UTC2 (CEST)
- Municipal code: 480
- Website: www.nordfynskommune.dk

Nordfyn Municipality (Danish: Nordfyns Kommune) is a kommune in the Region of Southern Denmark on the north coast of the island of Funen in central Denmark. The municipality covers an area of 452.30 km^{2} and has a total population of 29,179 (2026). It borders Odense Municipality to the east and south, Assens Municipality to the south and Middelfart Municipality to the west. To the east, Odense Fjord separates Nordfyn Municipality and Kerteminde Municipality. The seat of the municipality is the town of Bogense.

The municipality includes the inhabited islands of Æbelø, as well as the uninhabited islands and islets of Dræet, Ejlinge, Vigelsø, Skalø, Dørholm, Pludderholm, Gersø, Kyholm, Leammer, Trindelen, Ægholm, Drættegrund, Drætlingen, Lindholm and the islet group of Mågeøerne.

The municipality was formed in 2007 as a result of the 2007 Municipal Reform, where the municipalities of Bogense, Otterup and Søndersø were merged. It was originally planned that the new municipality should have used the existing name of Bogense Municipality but a local referendum preferred the name Nordfyn and this decision was approved by the Danish Interior Minister, Lars Løkke Rasmussen, in June 2006.

== History ==
Bogense was established as a mercantile center around 1200, built around a ferry dock with access to Klakring in Jutland. The first merchant privileges were given to Bogense in the later half of the 1200s, though it may have received them even earlier. The ferry service was an important industry, as was their exports of grain and cattle. The town grew to a large and wealthy town, but a fire in 1575 burnt down most of the town. The town began shrinking and became the smallest market town on Fyn. In 1672 only 438 people lived in Bogense. After the 1800s the town slowly recovered, though the ferry service was completely shut down in 1854. The town got a railway connection to Odense in 1882, and the harbour was expanded several times throughout the years.

The area around Bogense were part of the hundreds called Skovby Hundred. The rest of the modern territory of Nordfyn Municipality were part of the hundreds of Lunde and Skam. Until 1662 Skovby Hundred was a part of Rugård Fief while Lunde and Skam were part of Odensegård Fief. In 1662, Denmark's administrative divisions were changed. Fiefs (Danish: Len) were dissolved and the country split into counties. Rugård Fief became Rugård County and Odensegård Fief became Odensegård County. These counties merged with Assens County and Hindsgavl County in 1793 to form Odense County. This county lasted until 1970 when it merged with Svendborg County to form Funen County. In the 2007 Municipal Reform, the counties were dissolved and regions implemented. All of Funen County came under the Region of Southern Denmark.

The hundreds, market towns and birks were dissolved in the municipal reform of 1970 and split Denmark into 277 municipalities. Bogense Municipality was formed by merging five parish municipalities and Bogense Market Town Municipality. Otterup Municipality was formed by merging nine parish municipalities and Søndersø Municipality was formed by merging seven parish municipalities. In the 2007 Municipal Reform, the three municipalities of Bogense, Otterup and Søndersø merged to form Nordfyn Municipality.

=== Historical divisions ===
The table below shows the historical municipal subdivisions of Nordfyn Municipality.

Historical municipal divisions of Nordfyn Municipality
2007	1970	1966	1925	1921	1869	1842	1838	1200	Towns
Nordfyn Mun.	Bogense Mun.	Bogense Parish Mun.	Bogense Market Town Mun.					Bogense Market Town	Bogense
Nordfyn Mun.	Bogense Mun.	Bogense Parish Mun.	Ore Parish Mun.						Ore
Nordfyn Mun.	Bogense Mun.	Bogense Parish Mun.	Skovby Parish Mun.						Skovby
Nordfyn Mun.	Bogense Mun.	Bogense Parish Mun.	Guldbjerg-Nørre Sandager Parish Mun.						Gyldensteen
Nordfyn Mun.	Bogense Mun.	Bogense Parish Mun.	Klinte Parish Mun.	Klinte-Grindløse Parish Mun.					Nørreby
Nordfyn Mun.	Bogense Mun.	Bogense Parish Mun.	Grindløse Parish Mun.	Klinte-Grindløse Parish Mun.					Grindløse
Nordfyn Mun.	Otterup Mun.	Otterup Parish Mun.	Otterup Parish Mun.		Skeby-Otterup Parish Mun.				Otterup
Nordfyn Mun.	Otterup Mun.	Otterup Parish Mun.	Skeby Parish Mun.		Skeby-Otterup Parish Mun.				Hessum
Nordfyn Mun.	Otterup Mun.	Otterup Parish Mun.	Norup Parish Mun.						Hasmark
Nordfyn Mun.	Otterup Mun.	Otterup Parish Mun.	Krogsbølle Parish Mun.						Krogsbølle
Nordfyn Mun.	Otterup Mun.	Otterup Parish Mun.	Østrup Parish Mun.			Østrup-Hjadstrup Parish Mun.			Østrup
Nordfyn Mun.	Otterup Mun.	Otterup Parish Mun.	Hjadstrup Parish Mun.			Østrup-Hjadstrup Parish Mun.			Kappendrup
Nordfyn Mun.	Otterup Mun.	Otterup Parish Mun.	Nørre Nærå-Bederslev Parish Mun.						Bederslev
Nordfyn Mun.	Otterup Mun.	Otterup Parish Mun.	Uggerslev-Nørre Højrup Parish Mun.						Uggerslev
Nordfyn Mun.	Otterup Mun.	Otterup Parish Mun.	Lunde Parish Mun.						Lunde
Nordfyn Mun.	Søndersø Mun.	Søndersø Parish Mun.	Hårslev Parish Mun.						Hårslev
Nordfyn Mun.	Søndersø Mun.	Søndersø Parish Mun.	Veflinge Parish Mun.						Veflinge
Nordfyn Mun.	Søndersø Mun.	Søndersø Parish Mun.	Vigerslev Parish Mun.						Morud
Nordfyn Mun.	Søndersø Mun.	Søndersø Parish Mun.	Vigerslev Parish Mun.						Bredbjerg
Nordfyn Mun.	Søndersø Mun.	Søndersø Parish Mun.	Søndersø Parish Mun.						Søndersø
Nordfyn Mun.	Søndersø Mun.	Søndersø Parish Mun.	Skamby Parish Mun.						Skamby
Nordfyn Mun.	Søndersø Mun.	Søndersø Parish Mun.	Ejlby-Melby Parish Mun.						Ejlby
Nordfyn Mun.	Søndersø Mun.	Søndersø Parish Mun.	Særslev Parish Mun.						Særslev

== Towns ==
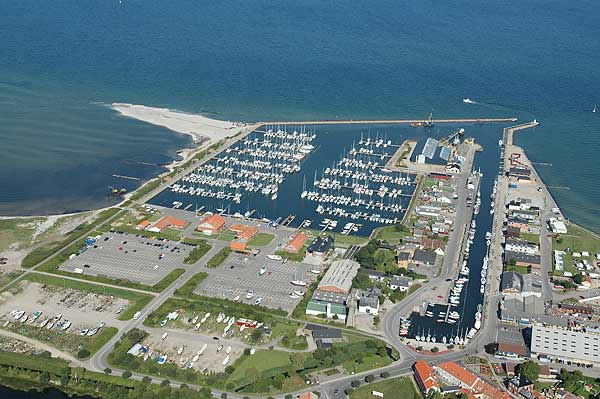
The harbours in Bogense.

Below are all settlements in the municipality with populations of at least 200 people (populations as of 2021).

Otterup	5,227
Bogense	3,976
Søndersø	3,319
Morud	1,828
Veflinge	858

Særslev	745
Skamby	437
Uggerslev	365
Hårslev	361
Lunde	331

Kappendrup	280
Østrup	266
Bredbjerg	224 (Note: Bredbjerg is located partially in Nordfyn Municipality and partially in Odense Municipality. 196 of the village's population lived in the part of the village located in Nordfyn Municipality, while 28 people lived in the part located in Odense Municipality.)

=== Bogense ===
Bogense is located on the northern coast of Fyn, 24 km north-west of Odense. It is the seat of the municipality, although not the municipality's largest settlement. In the southern part of the town is an industrial quarter. Centrally in the town is a camping ground Bogense Strand Camping, which serves as a popular tourist spot in the summer months with approximately 230 camping spots.

The town has two harbours: Bogense Harbour and Marina (Danish: Bogense Havn og Marina) and Bogense Fishery Harbour (Danish: Bogense Fiskerihavn). Around the two harbours are many facilities, such as cafés, restaurants, workshops and fish shops.

Located centrally in Bogense is a replica statue of Manneken Pis. It is occasionally dressed up in clothes. Also located in Bogense are Nordfyn Museum and Bogense Church. Dansk Sprognævn is located in Bogense.

=== Otterup ===
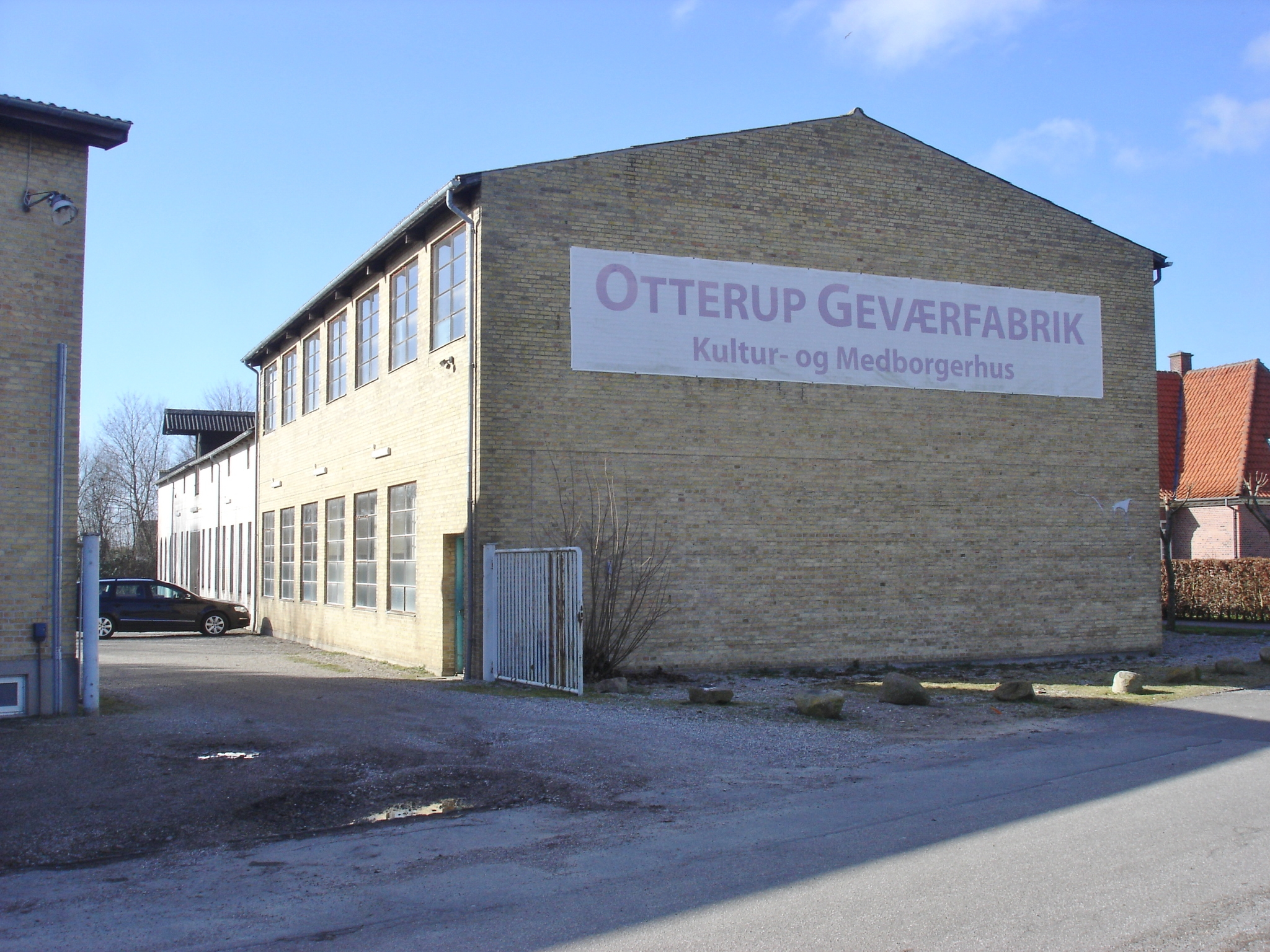
Otterup Rifle Factory.

Otterup is located in the eastern part of the municipality, approximately 10 km north of Odense. It is the largest settlement in the municipality, measured by population. Located centrally in the town are speciality shops and several facilities, including a library and a museum. In the southern part of town is an industrial quarter, as well as several market gardens.

Sights in Otterup include Otterup Church, Otterup Museum and Otterup Rifle Factory (Danish: Otterup Geværfabrik). The rifle factory today houses art exhibitions, having shut down rifle manufacturing in 1994.

=== Søndersø ===
Søndersø is located in the southern part of the municipality, 10 km south-west of Otterup, 13 km south-east of Bogense and 10 km north-west of Odense. Located in the southern part of the town is an industrial quarter that it home to the Danish factories of Orkla, including KiMs. Also located in the industrial quarter are companies specializing in plastic and metals.

Dallund Castle is located near Søndersø. Søndersø Church is located in Søndersø.

=== Villages ===
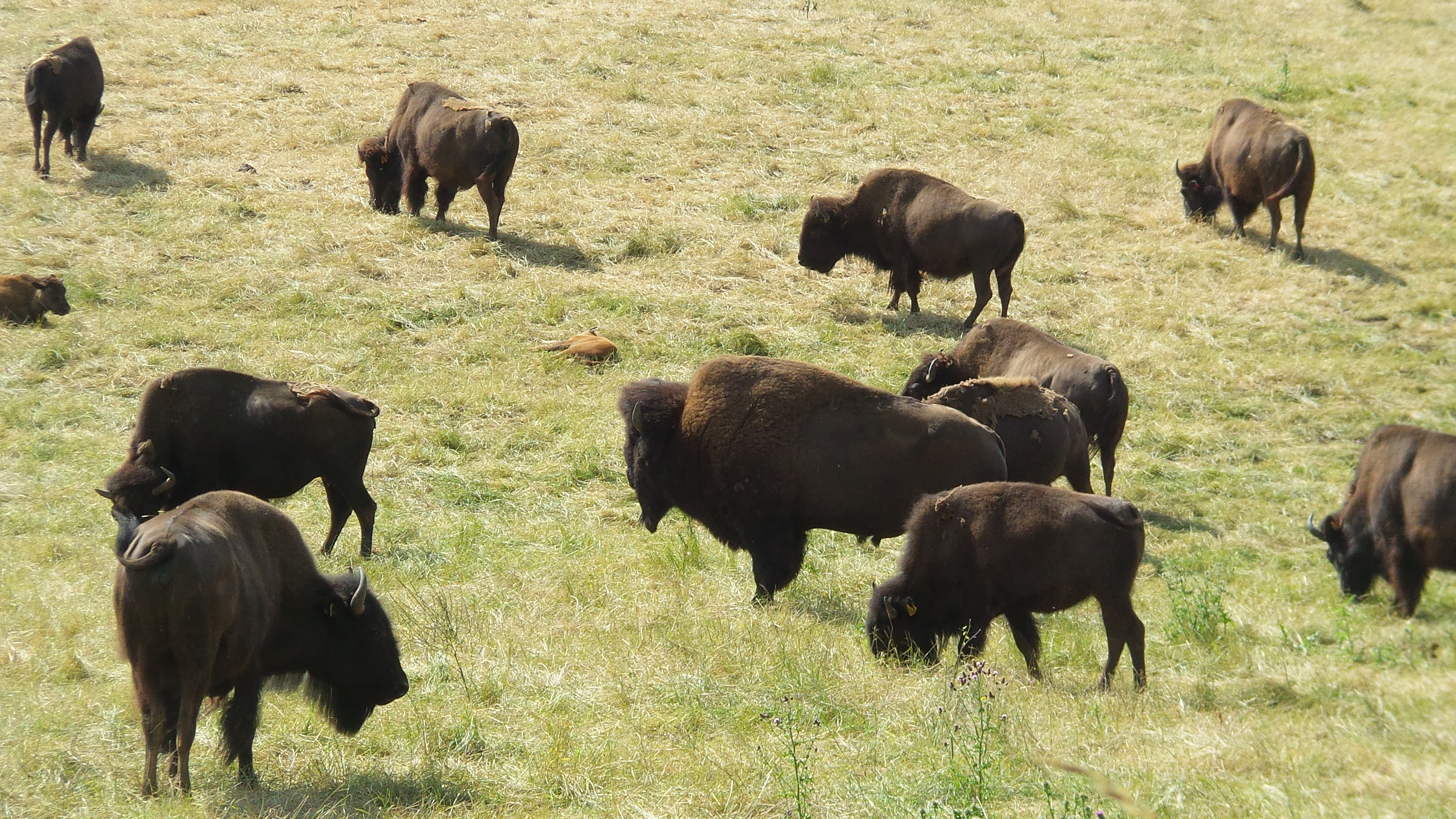
Bisons at Ditlevsdal Bison Farm in Morud.

With few large towns in the municipality, 35-40% of the citizens of Nordfyn Municipality live in smaller settlements, villages and rural areas. Many villages and small settlements have local councils that handle local matters.

Located at the northern border of Morud is the Ditlevsdal Bison Farm, the largest bison farm in Europe. It is open for activities with the bisons, and also sell the meat of the farm's bisons.

In the small settlement of Hindevad, located in the southern part of the municipality, is the Kongsdal Open Gardens (Danish: Kongsdal Åben Have). It is an open garden, spanning 20,000 m^{2}, with many different flowers, exotic plants and trees.

Beldringe is located on the south-eastern border of the municipality, next to the Hans Christian Andersen Airport. By the airport is a museum about the Nazi occupation of Denmark during World War II, with the museum specifically focussing on Fyn during the occupation.

In addition to these villages, there are a number of smaller settlements in the municipality. These are all the settlements with populations of less than 200 people:

Abildro
Agernæs
Alléhuse
Almindehuse
Andebøllemose
Askeby
Ballemose
Banggårde
Bare Brøndstrup
Bastrup
Bederslev
Beldringe
Bjerrumhuse
Bladstrup
Blæsbjerg
Bogø Huse
Bolmerod
Brageland
Brandsby
Bredstrup
Bregnebjerg
Brøndstrup Huse
Burskov Huse
Bækkegårde
Bårdesø
Bårdesø Strand
Egeby
Egense
Egensemark
Ejlby

Ejlby Lunde
Ejlinge
Ejlskov
Elverod
Emmelev
Enemærket
Engeldrup
Eskilstrup
Farbjerg
Farsbølle
Farstrup
Farstrup Hede
Fjederløkken
Fjællebro Huse
Flintebjerg
Flodmålene
Fogense
Fremmelev
Fælleden
Gamby
Gerskov
Gersø Huse
Glavendrup
Grevelshøj
Grindløse
Grydhøj
Grønløkke
Gudskov
Guldbjerg
Guleløkke

Gundstrup
Gungerne
Gyldensteen
Gyngstrup
Gyrup
Hals Huse
Harritslev
Hasmark
Hasmark Bomose
Hasmark Strand
Hedeboerne
Heden
Hessum
Himmelstrup
Hindevad
Hjadstrup
Hjortebjerg Huse
Holemarken
Holmene
Horsebækgyde
Hugget
Høved
Høvedskov
Jersore
Jullerup
Jullerup Enghave
Jørgensø
Jørgensø Strand
Kalvehave
Kattebjerg

Kelleby
Kelstrupskov
Kildehave
Kile
Kile Mosehuse
Klemstrup
Klinte
Klintebjerg
Kolshave
Koløkke
Kom-igen
Korshøj
Kosterslev
Krogsbølle
Kronborg
Kronsbjerg
Kræmmerkrog
Kvindevad Gyden
Kærby
Købeskov
Labølle
Lammesø
Langager
Langehede Huse
Lillebro Huse
Lillemose
Lindebjerg
Lindø
Lisbjerg
Lunde-Dalskov

Lundeshuse
Lundsbjerg
Løkkemarken
Lådne Brøndstrup
Låge
Maderup
Maderupskov
Marbæk
Mejlskov
Melby
Melby Ender
Moderup
Mosehuse
Møllegyde
Møllerled
Nellerud
Nellerud Brohuse
Nordskov
Norup
Noruphøje
Nymark
Nørre Esterbølle
Nørre Højrup
Nørre Nærå
Nørreby
Nørreby Hals
Nørreløkke
Ore
Paddesø
Profitten

Præstehuse
Pugholm
Pythuse
Reveldrup
Ringe
Roerslev
Rosenlund
Rosenvænget
Rostrup
Rue
Rue Hede
Rue Lundsgårde
Rækkehuse
Sasserod
Sasserod Kohave
Serup
Siveagre
Skeby
Skeldam
Skovby
Skovby Nymark
Skovby Sand
Skovhuse
Skovsgårde
Skæregårde
Skårup
Skåstrup
Slagstrup
Slevstrup
Smidstrup

Stavelsager
Stensby
Stillebæk
Stormose
Strandager
Svendstrup
Særslev Hede
Sømark
Sønder Esterbølle
Sønderby
Søndersø Skovhuse
Tevringe
Toderup
Tofte
Tokkelundshuse
Tokkendrup
Tolsvad
Torup
Traun
Trøjborg
Tværskov
Tørresø
Tørresø Strand
Tørveland
Tågerod
Tåstrup
Uggerslev Hede
Ulkendrup
Ullemose
Ullerup

Ulvehøj
Vedby
Veflinge Hede
Veflinge Nymark
Veflinge Stormark
Vejrup
Vekslund
Vellinge Huse
Vester Egense
Vesterby
Vesterløkke
Vestermarken
Vierne
Vigerslev
Væde
Væde Have
Væde Hed
Væde Mark
Vædeled
Vøjremose
Ølund
Ørbæk
Ørritslev
Ørritslev Mose
Ørritslev Skovhuse

== Nature ==
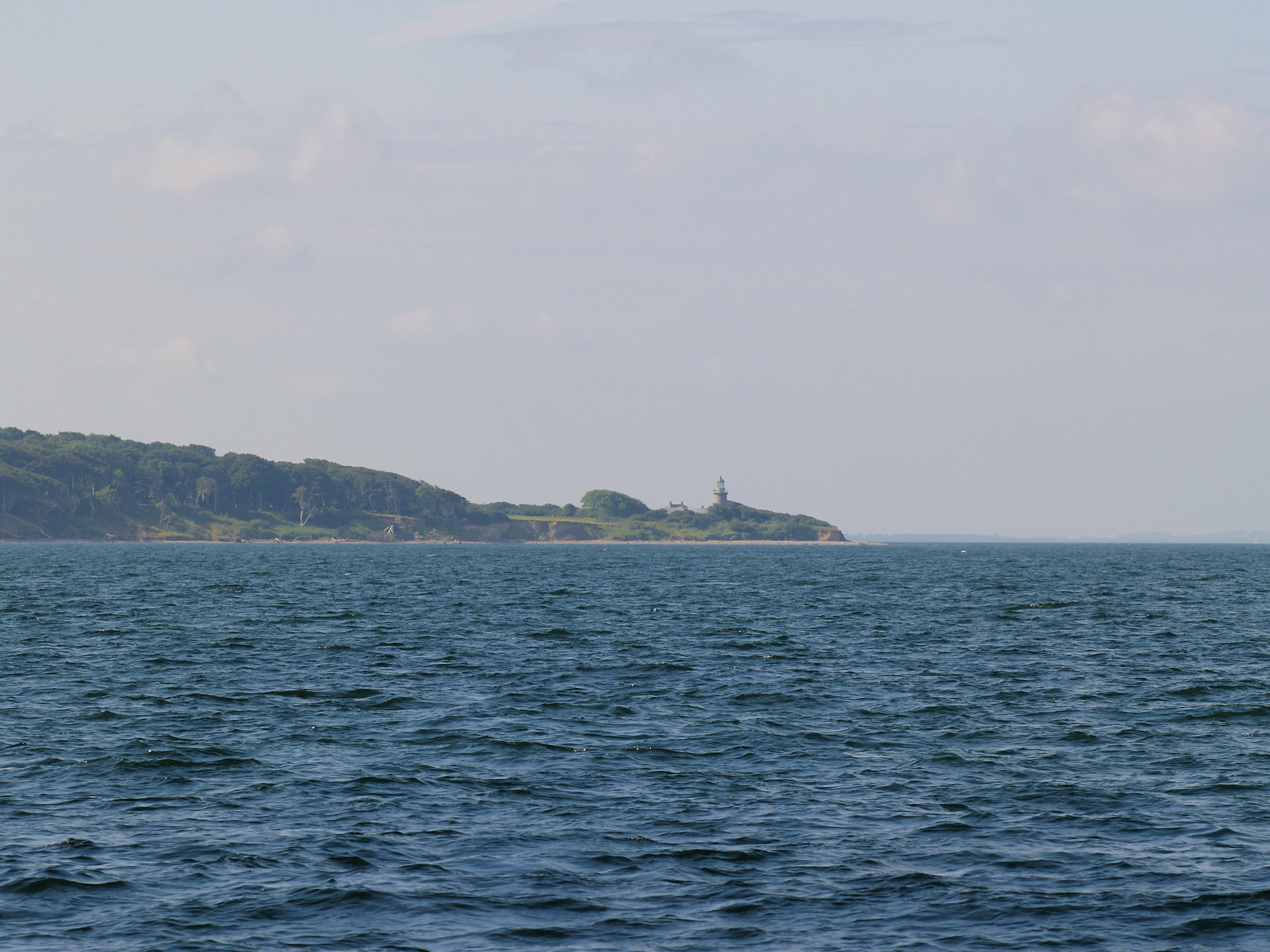
Æbelø seen from the coast of Fyn.

A large section of Nordfyn Municipality is part of a Natura 2000 area, meant to protect the nature in the ara. Plans have also been established for creating a nature park in and around the municipality's Natura 2000 areas. These areas include Æbelø, the ocean around it and long stretches of the municipality's coast.

Ejlinge is a small uninhabited island located in the northern part of the municipality. The island is privately owned and is currently uninhabited.

50 acres of Agernæs Storskov on the peninsula of Agernæs is protected. The forest contains the largest concentration of naturally growing oak on Fyn. The forest was protected to conserve the rich biodiversity in the forest, namely with many different insect species. These include many rare butterflies and moths, such as nemapogon falstriella.

Also protected in the municipality is the peninsula of Nørreby Hals, which is a breeding spot for many birds such as the pied avocet. Another protected peninsula is Enebærodde, where 296 acres were protected in 1988. Other protected areas in the municipality include a stretch of coast called Kissebjerg, an esker called Grindløse Ås and a bog called Lisbjerg Mose.

=== Æbelø and Dræet ===
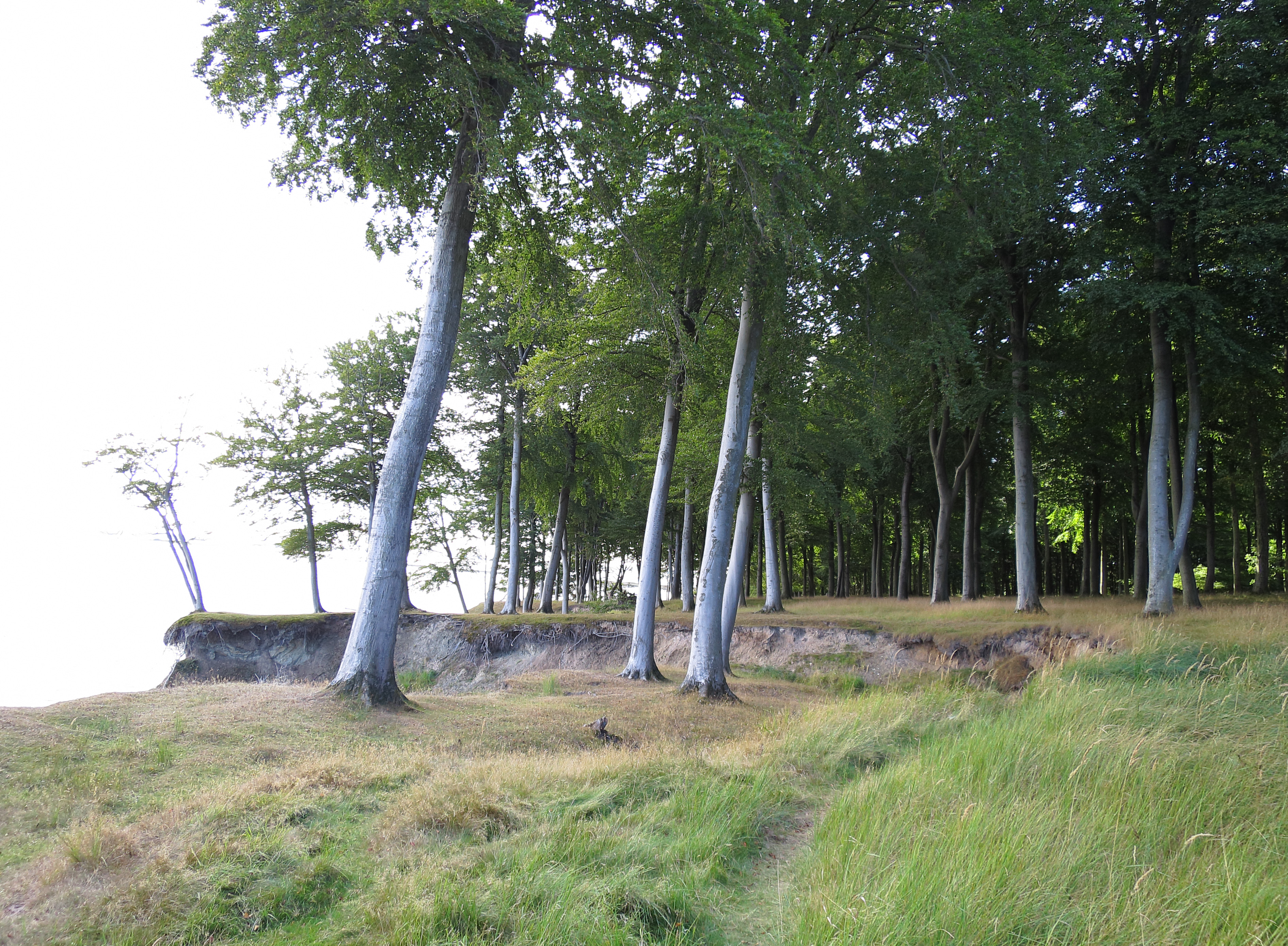
Beech forest on Æbelø.

Æbelø and Dræet are two islands located in the northern part of the municipality. The two islands are located roughly 100 meters apart, with Dræet located further south than Æbelø. The islands are only accessible by boat or by foot during low tide. The entirety of the two islands, the surrounding ocean and islets are protected, and it is not allowed to visit the islands during breeding season. Æbelø is owned by nature organization Age V. Jensen Naturfond. The island has a very small population in the summer, and is de facto uninhabited during the winter. Dræet has been uninhabited since the 1960s.

Æbelø was protected in 1998 to protect its nature. Various different plants and trees are found on the island, including the European crab apple, which gave the island its name - Æbelø directly translates to "apple island". Fallow deer live on both Æbelø and Dræet. The mouflon sheep can be found on Æbelø, though is not native to the island, but was introduced as an animal for hunting. The same has historically been the case for pheasants, but they are no longer brought to the island. The golden oriole is rare in Denmark, but breeds on Æbelø.

=== Vigelsø ===
Vigelsø is the largest island in Odense Fjord with an area of 132 acres. The island was historically much smaller, but was artificially expanded after dikes were built. It is not allowed to visit the southern part of the island, to protect the birds on the island. The northern part of the island is accessible, however, with a marked hiking trail, playground and ferry connection.

== Politics ==
Nordfyn Municipality was established on 1 January 2007 as a result of the Municipal Reform of 2007. The municipalities of Bogense, Otterup and Søndersø were merged to form the new Nordfyn Municipality.

On the table below is an overview of all elections held in Denmark since the 2007 Municipal Reform. The percentages in the table are the local results from Nordfyn Municipality. The party with the most votes received is shaded in their respective color. Venstre and the Social Democrats have been the largest parties in all but one election. The two parties tend to be fairly close in size. In the 2014 European Parliament election the largest party in the municipality became the Danish People's Party. This was the case in most of the country, and the first time in Denmark's history that the party had been the largest party in a nationwide election.

Election	Percentage													Turnout
Election	A	B	C	D	F	I	K	N	O	V	Ø	Å	...	Turnout
2007 Folketing	25.6	3.6	14.6	—	10.5	1.9	0.2	—	17.1	25.5	0.8	—	0.0	87.2%
2009 EP	30.5	1.8	19.8	—	9.0	0.3	—	4.5	14.3	17.9	—	—	1.7	62.3%
2009 Local	27.9	1.8	8.0	—	15.5	—	—	—	7.4	33.1	0.5	—	5.7	71.2%
2009 Region	30.0	2.2	8.7	—	13.1	—	0.2	—	8.8	33.6	0.9	—	2.4	70.9%
2011 Folketing	27.0	5.4	4.6	—	10.2	4.0	0.3	—	15.1	29.4	3.9	—	0.0	87.7%
2013 Local	27.5	2.3	4.5	—	5.2	3.9	—	—	9.3	40.0	3.2	—	4.2	76.3%
2013 Region	28.1	2.7	5.8	—	4.1	2.5	0.1	—	11.3	38.8	4.5	—	1.7	76.2%
2014 EP	20.0	2.8	21.1	—	6.1	1.4	—	6.0	28.2	14.4	—	—	—	58.3%
2015 Folketing	29.0	1.9	3.4	—	3.2	5.5	0.3	—	26.3	22.4	5.4	2.4	—	87.2%
2017 Local	28.1	2.5	5.0	1.1	7.1	2.6	—	—	10.2	40.1	3.2	—	—	74.8%
2017 Region	22.5	2.7	4.0	1.4	15.0	2.1	0.2	—	10.9	36.2	3.0	1.1	0.6	74.4%
2019 EP	27.4	7.1	6.3	—	11.4	1.8	—	4.4	12.1	22.6	4.6	2.4	—	65.4%
2019 Folketing	31.9	3.5	5.9	2.3	5.7	1.4	0.9	—	11.4	28.8	3.6	1.4	3.2	84.7%
2021 Local	28.1	3.0	8.0	3.2	6.9	—	—	—	6.4	42.6	1.8	—	—	68.8%
2021 Region	29.8	3.2	4.7	4.3	5.6	0.6	0.4	—	5.1	42.3	2.6	0.3	0.9	68.3%
Data from Kmdvalg.dk

=== Municipal council ===
Nordfyn's municipal council consists of 25 members, elected every four years. The municipal council has six political committees.

Below are the municipal councils elected since the Municipal Reform of 2007.

Election	Party									Total seats	Turnout	Elected mayor
Election	A	B	C	F	I	O	V	Ø	...	Total seats	Turnout	Elected mayor
2005	9	1	2	1		1	9		2	25	75.7%	Bent Dyssemark (V)
2009	7		2	5		1	9		1	25	71.2%	Morten Andersen (V)
2013	7		1	1	1	2	11	1	1	25	76.3%	Morten Andersen (V)
2017	7		1	2		2	13			25	74.8%	Morten Andersen (V)
2021	7	1	2	2		1	12			25	68.8%	Morten Andersen (V)
Data from Kmdvalg.dk

=== Mayors ===
Since the 2007 municipal reform, the mayors of Nordfyn Municipality have been:

#	Mayor	Party	Term
1	Bent Dyssemark	Venstre	2007–2009
2	Morten Andersen	Venstre	2010–2023
2	Mette Landtved-Holm	Venstre	2023-Present

== Economy ==
The largest industries in Nordfyn Municipality, by number of employees, are social institutions, retail, agriculture and construction.

Companies with their headquarter in Nordfyn Municipality include snack company KiMs, part of the Orkla ASA. KiMs is located in Søndersø.

== Demographics ==
Historical population
Year	Pop.	±%
2008	29,470	—
2009	29,651	+0.6%
2010	29,638	−0.0%
2011	29,507	−0.4%
2012	29,330	−0.6%
2013	29,224	−0.4%
2014	29,066	−0.5%
2015	29,030	−0.1%
2016	29,298	+0.9%
2017	29,446	+0.5%
2018	29,516	+0.2%
2019	29,693	+0.6%
2020	29,665	−0.1%
2021	29,549	−0.4%
Source: Statistikbanken.dk

There are 29,549 people living in Nordfyn Municipality (2021). 49.46% are women and 50.54% are men.

Below is the age distribution of the municipality.

Age
1. 0–5 (5.42%)
2. 6–17 (14.1%)
3. 18–35 (16.1%)
4. 36–64 (40.6%)
5. 64+ (23.8%)

== Education ==
There are 14 ground schools, 4 efterskoler and 2 independent schools in the municipality. There is also 1 gymnasium, 1 folk high school and 1 youth school in the municipality.

There are 3 libraries in the municipality: in Otterup, Bogense and Søndersø.

== Sights ==
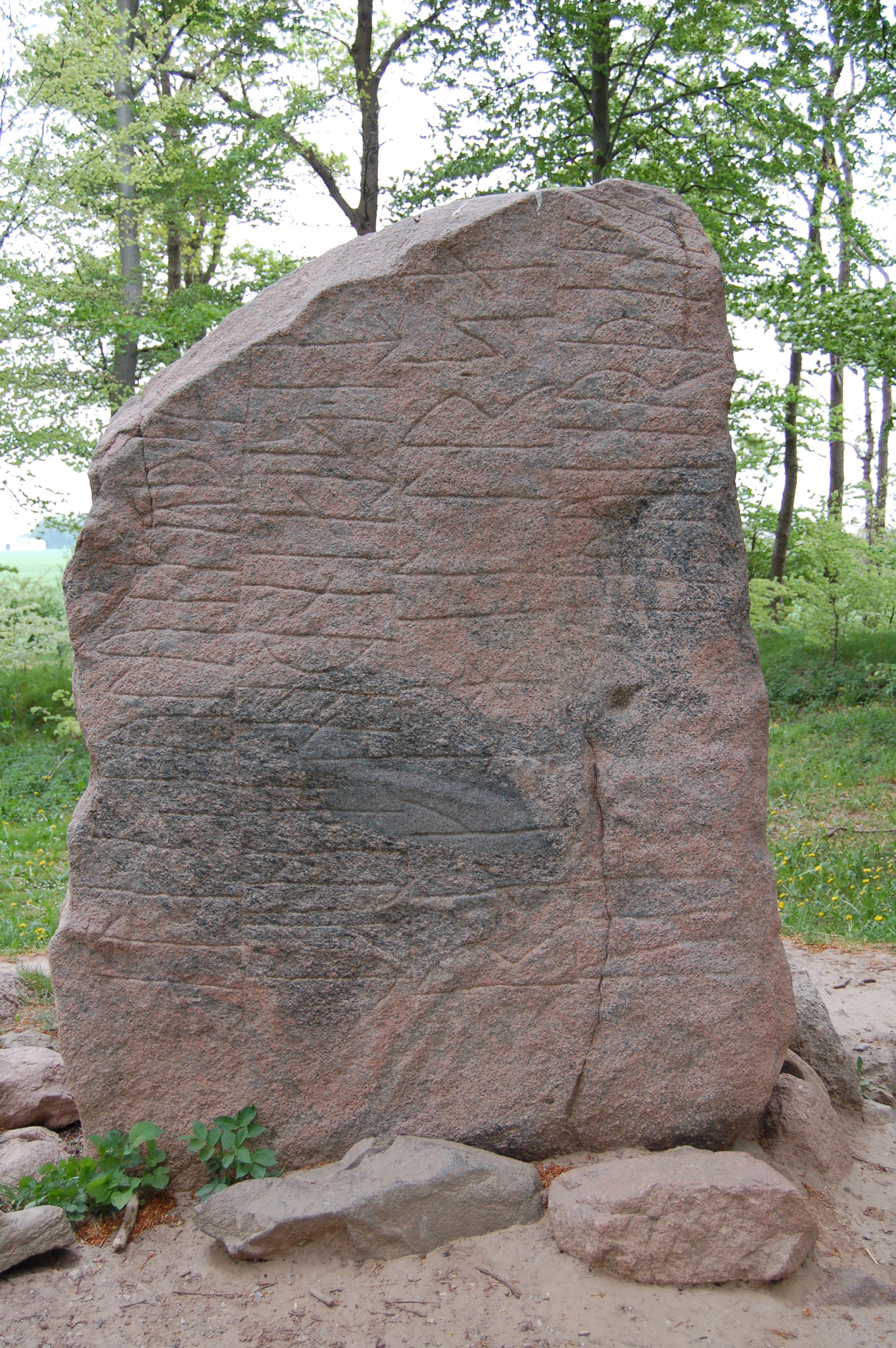
The Glavendrup Stone.

Nordfyn Municipality is sparsely populated with many small towns and villages, resulting in few major attractions. There are however, several smaller attractions scattered around the municipality.

- A replica statue of Manneken Pis is located centrally in Bogense. It is occasionally dressed up in clothes.
- The Ditlevsdal Bison Farm is located at the northern border of Morud. It is the largest bison farm in Europe. It is open for activities with the bisons, and also sell the meat of the farm's bisons.
- Kongsdal Open Garden (Danish: Kongsdal Åben Have) is an open garden, spanning 20,000 m^{2}, with many different flowers, exotic plants and trees. It is located south of Hindevad.
- Located by the Hans Christian Andersen Airport is a museum about the Nazi occupation of Denmark during World War II, with the museum specifically focussing on Fyn during the occupation.
- The Glavendrup stone is located near the settlement of Glavendrup. It is a runestone, and the runestone with the longest inscription in Denmark.
- Nordfyn Museum (Danish: Nordfyns Museum) is a local history museum about Bogense and the municipality's area. It is located in Bogense.
- Otterup Museum is a local history museum about Otterup. It is located in Otterup. The museum building is the oldest in the town, originating from 1722.
- The Aero Mill (Danish: Aeromøllen) is a former wind mill and the largest location on Bogense's harbour. The mill was built in 1942 by F. L. Smith and opened on 21 January 1943. The wings were dismantled from the mill in 1953.
- Bogø Pump Mill (Danish: Bogø Pumpemølle) is a pump mill used to dam in Odense Fjord. It was built in 1873 and is located in Bogø Huse. The wings of the mill were removed shortly after the Second World War.
- Bogense Water Tower (Danish: Bogense Vandtårn) is a former water tower located centrally in Bogense. It was built in 1910 and was in use until 1996. Today it exhibits art installations.

=== Churches ===
See List of churches in Nordfyn Municipality

== Notable residents ==
=== Public thought and politics ===
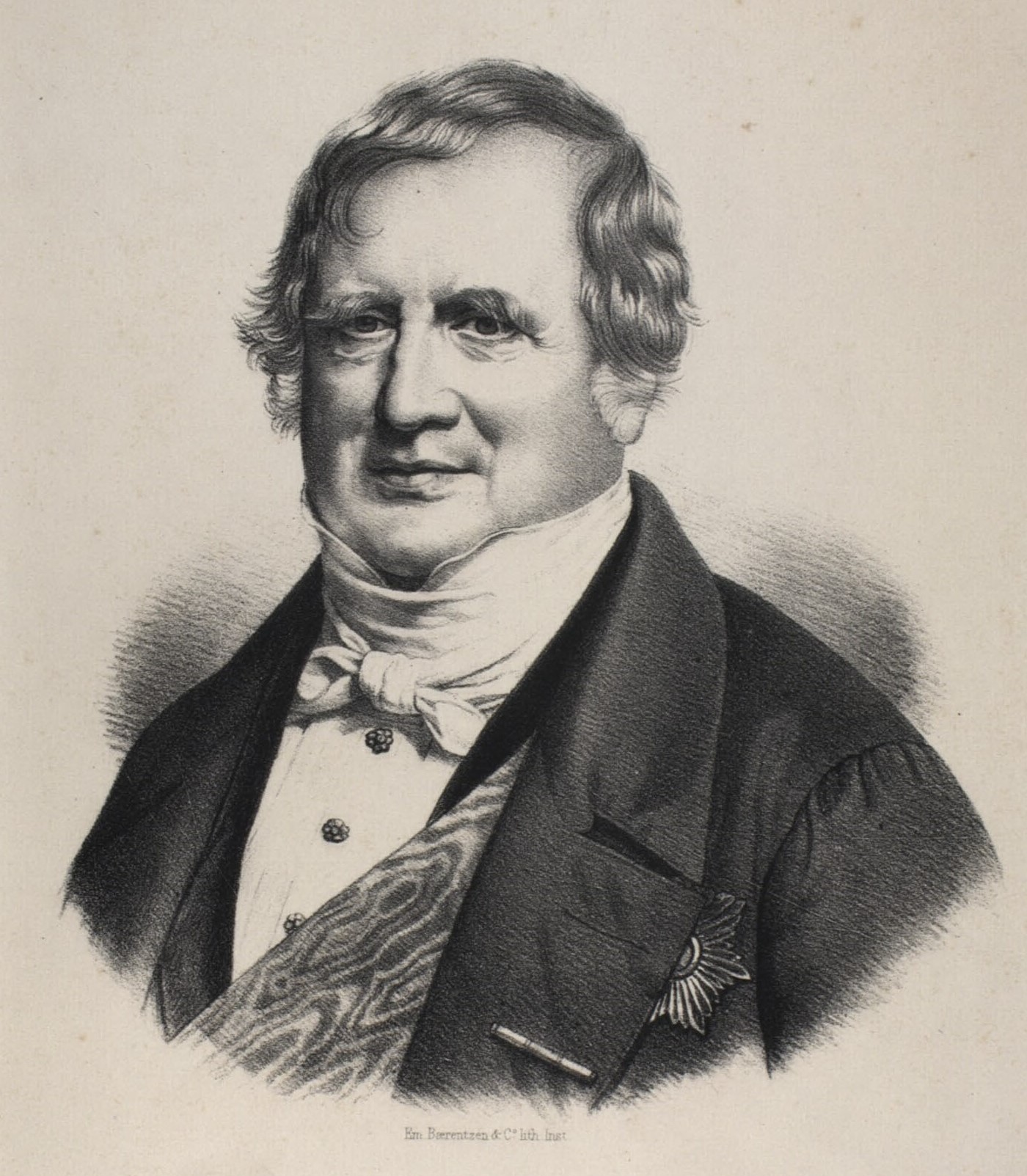
Adam Wilhelm Moltke

- Adam Wilhelm Moltke (1785 on Egebjerggård — 1864), politician and the first Prime Minister of Denmark from 1848 to 1852.
- Klaus Berntsen (1844 in Eskilstrup — 1927), politician and Council President of Denmark
- Carl Brummer (1864 in Bogense — 1953), architect
- Carl Christensen (1869 in Særslev — 1936), the last Danish executioner
- Martin Knudsen (1871 in Hasmark — 1949), physicist
- Hans Peder Steensby (1875 — 1920), ethnographer, geographer and professor
- Petra Petersen (born 1901 in Nørre Højrup — 1989), politician and resistance fighter during the Nazi occupation of Denmark
- Herdis von Magnus (1912 in Bogense — 1992), virologist and polio expert
- Allan Hansen (born 1949 in Bogense), chairman of Danish Football Association
- Allan K. Pedersen (born 1962 in Veflinge), businessman and sports team owner

=== Art ===
- Inger Møller (1886 in Otterup — 1979), silversmith
- Aase Hansen (1935 in Vigerslev — 1993), actress
- Leif Davidsen (born 1950 in Otterup), author and journalist
- Jens Albinus (born 1965 in Bogense), actor and director

=== Sport ===
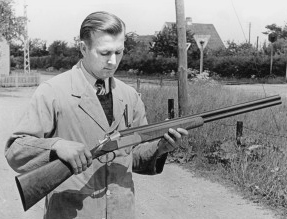
Uffe Schultz Larsen

- Hans Schultz (1864 — 1937), sport shooter and founder of the Schultz & Larsen rifle company
- Jørgen Møller (1873 in Otterup — 1944), chess player
- Aage Berntsen (1885 in Særslev — 1952), Olympic fencer
- Svend Aage Frederiksen (1920 in Bogense — 1999), Olympic athlete
- Uffe Schultz Larsen (1921 in Otterup — 2005), Olympic shooter
- Niels Rasmussen (1922 in Søndersø — 1991), Olympic rower
- Keld Gantzhorn (born 1954 in Gamby), footballer and manager
- Mogens Just Mikkelsen (born 1962 in Bogense), Olympic sailor
- Peter Ravn (born 1962 in Bogense), motorcycle speedway rider
- Jesper Bøge Pedersen (born 1990 in Bogense), footballer
- Patrick Banggaard (born 1994 in Otterup), footballer
- Benjamin Hansen (born 1994 in Bogense), footballer
