= 2025 Nordfyn municipal election =

- 18 November 2025

All 25 seats to the Nordfyn municipal council 13 seats needed for a majority
- Turnout: 19,532 (83.0%) ▲14.3%
| | First party | Second party | Third party |
|---|---|---|---|
| | V | A | F |
| Party | Venstre | Social Democrats | Green Left |
| Last election | 12 seats, 42.6% | 7 seats, 28.1% | 2 seats, 6.9% |
| Seats won | 11 | 5 | 3 |
| Seat change | ▼1 | ▼2 | ▲1 |
| Popular vote | 7,532 | 4,087 | 1,747 |
| Percentage | 39.2% | 21.3% | 9.1% |
| Swing | ▼3.4% | ▼6.8% | ▲2.1% |
| | Fourth party | Fifth party | Sixth party |
| | Æ | O | C |
| Party | Denmark Democrats | Danish People's Party | Conservatives |
| Last election | Did not stand | 1 seat, 6.4% | 2 seats, 8.0% |
| Seats won | 2 | 1 | 1 |
| Seat change | ▲2 | 0 | ▼1 |
| Popular vote | 1,546 | 1,184 | 1,146 |
| Percentage | 8.0% | 6.2% | 6.0% |
| Swing | New | ▼0.3% | ▼2.0% |
| | Seventh party | Eighth party |
| | B | I |
| Party | Social Liberals | Liberal Alliance |
| Last election | 1 seat, 3.0% | Did not stand |
| Seats won | 1 | 1 |
| Seat change | 0 | ▲1 |
| Popular vote | 703 | 619 |
| Percentage | 3.7% | 3.2% |
| Swing | ▲0.6% | New |
Mayor before election
Mette Landtved-Holm
Venstre
Mayor after election
Mette Landtved-Holm
Venstre

The 2025 Nordfyn Municipal election was held on November 18, 2025, to elect the 25 members to sit in the regional council for the Nordfyn Municipal council, in the period of 2026 to 2029. Mette Landtved-Holm from Venstre, would secure re-election.

== Background ==
Following the 2021 election, Morten Andersen from Venstre became mayor for his fourth term. However, Andersen stepped down following him kissing a woman co-worker at a christmas party. Mette Landtved-Holm took over the mayoral position, also from Venstre, following this. She would run her first full term.

== Electoral system ==
For elections to Danish municipalities, a number varying from 9 to 31 are chosen to be elected to the municipal council. The seats are then allocated using the D'Hondt method and a closed list proportional representation. Nordfyn Municipality had 25 seats in 2025.

== Electoral alliances ==
=== Electoral Alliance 1 ===
| Party | | Political alignment |
|---|---|---|
| B | Social Liberals | Centre to Centre-left |
| F | Green Left | Centre-left to Left-wing |
| Ø | Red-Green Alliance | Left-wing to Far-Left |

=== Electoral Alliance 2 ===
| Party | | Political alignment |
|---|---|---|
| C | Conservatives | Centre-right |
| I | Liberal Alliance | Centre-right to Right-wing |

=== Electoral Alliance 3 ===
| Party | | Political alignment |
|---|---|---|
| O | Danish People's Party | Right-wing to Far-right |
| V | Venstre | Centre-right |
| Æ | Denmark Democrats | Right-wing to Far-right |

== Results by polling station ==
| Division | A | B | C | D | E | F | I | O | V | Æ | Ø |
| Division | % | % | % | % | % | % | % | % | % | % | % |
|---|---|---|---|---|---|---|---|---|---|---|---|
| Bogense | 20.0 | 6.0 | 5.8 | 0.9 | 0.3 | 9.1 | 2.2 | 4.3 | 41.2 | 8.8 | 1.5 |
| Klinte | 18.6 | 4.2 | 4.4 | 0.8 | 0.2 | 4.6 | 4.2 | 7.5 | 46.0 | 7.9 | 1.5 |
| Krogsbølle | 19.2 | 1.8 | 2.9 | 1.1 | 0.2 | 7.8 | 3.2 | 7.7 | 41.9 | 11.6 | 2.6 |
| Otterup | 25.8 | 1.6 | 2.3 | 2.1 | 0.1 | 6.6 | 2.9 | 8.5 | 41.5 | 6.7 | 1.9 |
| Skovløkken | 21.4 | 2.8 | 2.5 | 1.8 | 0.6 | 11.6 | 2.6 | 16.1 | 25.5 | 12.6 | 2.5 |
| Veflinge | 23.9 | 1.8 | 5.9 | 1.0 | 0.9 | 10.4 | 3.7 | 5.9 | 33.0 | 11.1 | 2.4 |
| Hårslev | 20.0 | 6.0 | 5.8 | 0.9 | 0.3 | 9.1 | 2.2 | 4.3 | 41.2 | 8.8 | 1.5 |
| Morud | 17.0 | 3.1 | 21.1 | 1.8 | 0.7 | 12.6 | 8.0 | 3.2 | 27.6 | 3.4 | 1.6 |
| Særslev | 20.5 | 3.8 | 3.4 | 1.3 | 0.5 | 8.1 | 3.9 | 6.6 | 39.7 | 10.6 | 1.5 |
| Søndersø | 22.5 | 2.6 | 5.3 | 1.1 | 0.4 | 11.4 | 2.9 | 5.8 | 41.0 | 5.7 | 1.3 |

== Results ==
| Party | | Votes | % | +/- | Seats | +/- |
Nordfyn Municipality
| V | Venstre | 7,532 | 39.19 | -3.39 | 11 | -1 |
| A | Social Democrats | 4,087 | 21.26 | -6.80 | 5 | -2 |
| F | Green Left | 1,747 | 9.09 | +2.15 | 3 | +1 |
| Æ | Denmark Democrats | 1,546 | 8.04 | New | 2 | New |
| O | Danish People's Party | 1,184 | 6.16 | -0.28 | 1 | 0 |
| C | Conservatives | 1,146 | 5.96 | -2.04 | 1 | -1 |
| B | Social Liberals | 703 | 3.66 | +0.61 | 1 | 0 |
| I | Liberal Alliance | 619 | 3.22 | New | 1 | New |
| Ø | Red-Green Alliance | 336 | 1.75 | -0.03 | 0 | 0 |
| D | Vi ældre | 253 | 1.32 | New | 0 | New |
| E | Nordfyn på forkant | 67 | 0.35 | New | 0 | New |
| Total | | 19,220 | 100 | N/A | 25 | N/A |
| Invalid votes | | 53 | 0.23 | -0.02 | | |
| Blank votes | | 259 | 1.10 | +0.10 | | |
| Turnout | | 19,532 | 83.04 | +14.25 | | |
Source: valg.dk

== Opinion polls ==
| Polling firm | Fieldwork date | Sample size | V | A | C | F | O | B | Ø | D | E | I | Æ | Others | Lead |
|---|---|---|---|---|---|---|---|---|---|---|---|---|---|---|---|
| Epinion | 4 Sep - 13 Oct 2025 | 516 | 35.8 | 26.0 | 7.4 | 7.8 | 5.7 | 2.8 | 2.2 | – | – | 4.2 | 8.1 | 0.1 | 9.8 |
| 2024 european parliament election | 9 Jun 2024 | | 18.9 | 20.6 | 7.2 | 13.5 | 7.9 | 3.9 | 2.8 | – | – | 5.4 | 12.6 | – | 1.7 |
| 2022 general election | 1 Nov 2022 | | 14.2 | 34.1 | 4.5 | 5.9 | 3.4 | 1.4 | 2.0 | – | – | 5.4 | 13.3 | – | 19.9 |
| 2021 regional election | 16 Nov 2021 | | 42.3 | 29.8 | 4.7 | 5.6 | 5.1 | 3.2 | 2.6 | – | – | 0.6 | – | – | 12.5 |
| 2021 municipal election | 16 Nov 2021 | | 42.6 (12) | 28.1 (7) | 8.0 (2) | 6.9 (2) | 6.4 (1) | 3.0 (1) | 1.8 (0) | – | – | – | – | – | 14.5 |
