= 2021 Nordfyn municipal election =

- 16 November 2021

All 25 seats to the Nordfyn Municipal Council 13 seats needed for a majority
- Turnout: 16,398 (68.3%) ▼6.0pp
| | First party | Second party | Third party |
|---|---|---|---|
| | V | A | C |
| Party | Venstre | Social Democrats | Conservatives |
| Last election | 13 seats, 40.1% | 7 seats, 28.1% | 1 seat, 5.1% |
| Seats won | 12 | 7 | 2 |
| Seat change | ▼1 | 0 | ▲1 |
| Popular vote | 6,858 | 4,520 | 1289 |
| Percentage | 42.6% | 28.1% | 8.0% |
| Swing | ▲2.5% | 0% | ▲2.9% |
| | Fourth party | Fifth party | Sixth party |
| | F | O | B |
| Party | Green Left | Danish People's Party | Social Liberals |
| Last election | 2 seats, 7.1% | 2 seats, 10.2% | 0 seats, 2.5% |
| Seats won | 2 | 1 | 1 |
| Seat change | 0 | ▼1 | ▲1 |
| Popular vote | 1.118 | 1,037 | 491 |
| Percentage | 6.9% | 6.4% | 3.0% |
| Swing | ▼0.2% | ▼3.8% | ▲0.5% |
Mayor before election
Morten Andersen
Venstre
Mayor after election
Morten Andersen
Venstre

All of the three elections that had been held in Nordfyn Municipality following the 2007 municipal reform had ended in Morten Andersen from Venstre becoming mayor. In the 2017 election, Venstre would even win a seat majority.

Morten Andersen was seeking a fourth term for this election. He was expected to succeed in his attempt.

In the final result, Venstre would lose a seat, despite them increasing their vote share by 2.5%. However the traditional blue bloc parties won 15 seats, and it was expected that he would continue. This was eventually confirmed.

== Electoral system ==
For elections to Danish municipalities, a number varying from 9 to 31 are chosen to be elected to the municipal council. The seats are then allocated using the D'Hondt method and a closed list proportional representation. Nordfyn Municipality had 25 seats in 2021

Unlike in Danish General Elections, in elections to municipal councils, electoral alliances are allowed.

== Electoral alliances ==
=== Electoral Alliance 1 ===
| Party | | Political alignment |
|---|---|---|
| C | Conservatives | Centre-right |
| O | Danish People's Party | Right-wing to Far-right |
| V | Venstre | Centre-right |

=== Electoral Alliance 2 ===
| Party | | Political alignment |
|---|---|---|
| B | Social Liberals | Centre to Centre-left |
| F | Green Left | Centre-left to Left-wing |
| Ø | Red–Green Alliance | Left-wing to Far-Left |

== Results by polling station ==
| Division | A | B | C | D | F | O | V | Ø |
| Division | % | % | % | % | % | % | % | % |
|---|---|---|---|---|---|---|---|---|
| Bogense | 29.6 | 6.1 | 5.1 | 1.6 | 4.8 | 4.4 | 47.1 | 1.4 |
| Klinte | 21.1 | 5.1 | 5.7 | 3.9 | 6.5 | 7.7 | 48.4 | 1.6 |
| Kongslund | 21.0 | 5.2 | 5.1 | 3.2 | 6.3 | 5.2 | 51.9 | 2.0 |
| Horsebæk | 28.4 | 1.1 | 5.0 | 5.6 | 5.8 | 7.8 | 44.5 | 1.7 |
| Skovløkke | 32.8 | 2.1 | 3.7 | 3.4 | 8.8 | 16.7 | 29.6 | 2.8 |
| Løkkemark | 25.1 | 1.0 | 4.0 | 5.6 | 4.6 | 11.4 | 45.9 | 2.4 |
| Otterup | 34.7 | 1.3 | 5.3 | 2.5 | 6.6 | 7.5 | 40.4 | 1.7 |
| Krogsbølle | 33.7 | 1.6 | 5.0 | 4.9 | 5.0 | 7.1 | 40.6 | 2.1 |
| Veflinge | 30.5 | 2.7 | 10.4 | 3.5 | 9.0 | 6.6 | 34.6 | 2.7 |
| Hårslev | 20.3 | 4.3 | 5.4 | 5.3 | 7.1 | 10.8 | 44.8 | 2.1 |
| Morud | 19.6 | 3.3 | 27.2 | 2.0 | 8.6 | 2.3 | 35.2 | 1.9 |
| Særslev | 24.9 | 3.3 | 4.8 | 4.8 | 10.3 | 5.5 | 44.7 | 1.8 |
| Søndersø | 27.9 | 2.2 | 7.8 | 2.7 | 8.3 | 4.3 | 45.6 | 1.2 |

== Results ==
| Party | | Votes | % | +/- | Seats | +/- |
Nordfyn Municipality
| V | Venstre | 6,858 | 42.58 | +2.47 | 12 | -1 |
| A | Social Democrats | 4,520 | 28.06 | -0.05 | 7 | 0 |
| C | Conservatives | 1,289 | 8.00 | +2.94 | 2 | +1 |
| F | Green Left | 1,118 | 6.94 | -0.13 | 2 | 0 |
| O | Danish People's Party | 1,037 | 6.44 | -3.75 | 1 | -1 |
| D | New Right | 507 | 3.15 | +2.04 | 0 | 0 |
| B | Social Liberals | 491 | 3.05 | +0.58 | 1 | +1 |
| Ø | Red-Green Alliance | 287 | 1.78 | -1.47 | 0 | 0 |
| Total | | 16,107 | 100 | N/A | 25 | N/A |
| Invalid votes | | 58 | 0.24 | +0.07 | | |
| Blank votes | | 233 | 0.98 | -0.19 | | |
| Turnout | | 16,398 | 68.78 | -5.98 | | |
Source: valg.dk
