= Hans Christian Andersen Airport =

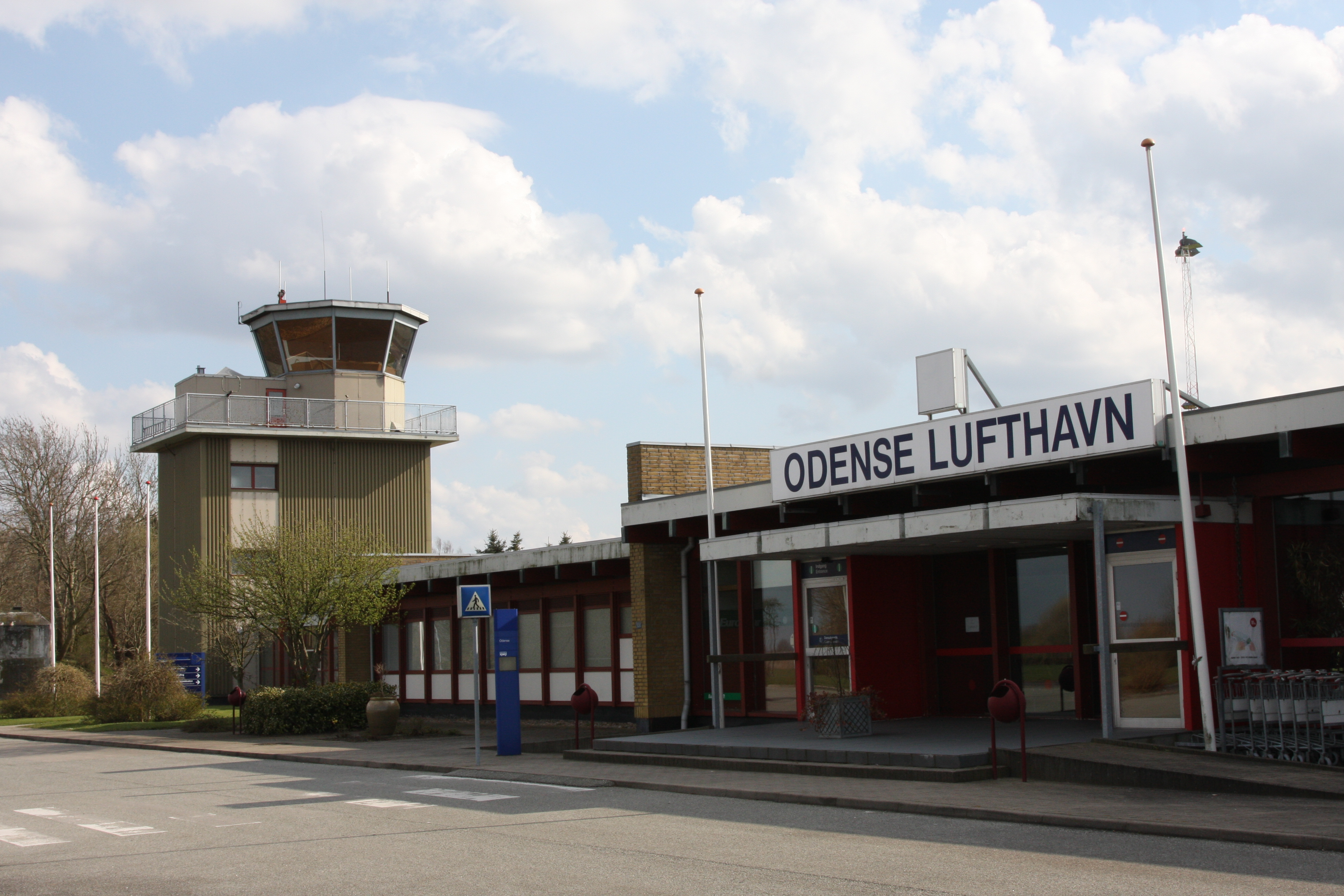
- IATA: ODE; ICAO: EKOD

Summary
- Airport type: Public
- Operator: Odense Lufthavn S.m.b.a.
- Serves: Odense, Denmark
- Elevation AMSL: 56 ft / 17 m
- Coordinates: 55°28′36″N 010°19′51″E
- Website: hca-airport.dk

Map
- Location of airport in Denmark

Runways
Direction	Length		Surface
Direction	ft	m	Surface
06/24	6,562	2,000	Asphalt
13/31	2,280	695	Grass

Statistics (2016)
- Passengers: 23,183

Hans Christian Andersen Airport (Danish: Odense Lufthavn, also often referred to as Beldringe Lufthavn) (IATA: ODE, ICAO: EKOD) is a small airport serving the Danish city of Odense. It is located in the village of Beldringe, some 9 km north-northwest of the city. The airport is named after Hans Christian Andersen, a renowned Danish author who was born in Odense.

== History ==
The airstrip was constructed for military purposes in the early 1940s during the German occupation of Denmark.

Passenger numbers from the airport fell significantly after the Great Belt Fixed Link was opened in 1998, and today there are no longer any commercial flights between Odense and Copenhagen. Government operations of the airport were suspended in 1998, and operations were continued as a limited company operated by Funen County and the municipalities of Odense, Bogense, Munkebo, Søndersø, and Otterup. Effective 1 January 2007, the airport is owned by Odense (84.38%), Nordfyn (12.94%) and Kerteminde municipalities (2.68%).

In 2000, a joint venture was established with Plane Station Denmark A/S for operating the facility. The arrangement was later terminated with politicians citing the low number of flights from the facility, and operations were resumed by the county and municipalities.

In 2006, flights commenced between Odense and northern Italy and in 2007, a route operated from Odense to Nîmes, France. There were also flights to Burgas but these were cancelled by Hemus Air citing that the runway was too short. Tyrkiet Eksperten cancelled a scheduled route to Turkey citing the same concern.

In 2007, the runway was extended to 2,000 meters. In 2008, Falk Lauritsen & Apollo Rejser started weekly summer flights to Chania, Greece with an Airbus A320-200 from Iberworld and Gislev Rejser replaced the Nîmes flight with a route to Béziers, France.

== Airlines and destinations ==
The following airlines operate regular scheduled and charter flights at the airport:

Airlines	Destinations
Sunclass Airlines	Seasonal charter: Palma de Mallorca

== See also ==
- List of the largest airports in the Nordic countries
