= Orla Hermann Krause =

Danish chess master and analyst

Personal information
- Born: Orla Hermann Krause; November 3, 1867
- Died: September 28, 1935 (aged 67)

Chess career
- Country: Denmark

Orla Hermann Krause (3 November 1867 – 28 September 1935) was a Danish chess master and analyst.

He took 2nd, behind Andreas Rosendahl, at Copenhagen 1895, took 2nd at Copenhagen 1899 (the 2nd Nordic Championship, Jorgen Moeller won), took 5th at Copenhagen 1907 (the 7th Nordic-ch, Paul Saladin Leonhardt won), shared 2nd, behind Paul Johner at Copenhagen 1916 (the 9th Nordic-ch), tied for 4-8th at Copenhagen 1924 (the 12th Nordic-ch, Aron Nimzowitsch won), and tied for 5-8th at Copenhagen 1934 (the 16th Nordic-ch, Nimzowitsch won).

Krause played for Denmark at first board (+4 –5 =6) in the 1st Chess Olympiad at London 1927, and won team silver medal there.

In 1938 a 49 page analysis titled "About the opening position in chess" was published by Jørgen Møller with the help of the Danish chess association. It is written by Dr. Krause and passed onto Jørgen Møller for review shortly before Krause's death. In it, Krause investigates whether or not white has an inherent advantage from the opening position, and attempts to prove his point by proposing several laws. The analysis ends without any conclusive results, but with hopeful prospects for the "Beauty of chess".

His name is attached to the Krause Variation in the Queen's Pawn Opening (1. d4 d5 2. Nf3 c5!?). He found many new ideas in the Slav Defense in the 1920s (among others: 1.d4 d5 2.c4 c6 3.Nf3 Nf6 4.Nc3 dxc4 5.a4 Bf5 6.Nh4!?). Also, the Krause Attack is named after him.
