= Torno =

Torno may refer to:

== Places ==
Bolivia

- El Torno, Santa Cruz, a town

Denmark

- Tornø, a small island in the Odense Fjord of Funen

Italy

- Torno (river), a river in the province of Reggio Calabria
- Torno, Lombardy, a comune in the province of Como

Portugal

- Torno, Portugal, a freguesia in the municipio of Lousada, Porto
- Vilar do Torno e Alentém, a freguesia in the municipio of Lousada, Porto

Romania

- Tornó, the Hungarian name for Târnova Commune, Caraş-Severin County

Spain

- El Torno, a municipality in the province of Cáceres

== Other ==
- Nelson Torno (born 1927), Argentine sports shooter
