= Otterup Municipality =

Former municipality of Denmark

Coordinates: 55°31′00″N 10°24′00″E

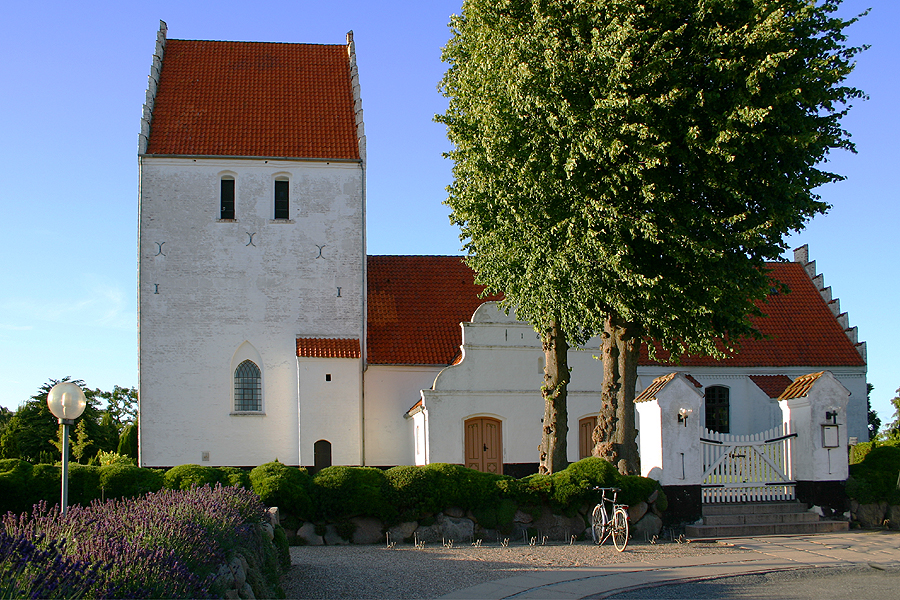
Otterup Church in Otterup municipality, Denmark. Photograph: Malene Thyssen

Until 1 January 2007 Otterup municipality was a municipality (Danish, kommune) in the former Funen County on the north coast of the island of Funen in central Denmark. The municipality included the island of Vigelsø, and covered an area of 169 km^{2}. It had a total population of 10,973 (2005). Its last mayor was Bent Dyssemark, a member of the Venstre (Liberal Party) political party. The main town and the site of its municipal council is the town of Otterup.

The municipality was created in 1970 as the result of a kommunalreform ("Municipality Reform") that merged a number of existing parishes:

- Bederslev Parish (Skam Herred)
- Hjadstrup Parish (Lunde Herred)
- Krogsbølle Parish (Skam Herred)
- Lunde Parish (Lunde Herred)
- Norup Parish (Lunde Herred)
- Nørre Højrup Parish (Skam Herred)
- Nørre Nærå Parish (Skam Herred)
- Otterup Parish (Lunde Herred)
- Skeby Parish (Lunde Herred)
- Uggerslev Parish (Skam Herred)
- Østrup Parish (Lunde Herred)
- Hundstrup Parish (Skam Herred)
- Kørup Parish (Skam Herred)

Otterup municipality ceased to exist as the result of Kommunalreformen ("The Municipality Reform" of 2007). It was merged with existing Søndersø and Bogense municipalities to form the new Nordfyn municipality. This created a municipality with an area of 451 km^{2} and a total population of 28,655 (2005). The new municipality belongs to Region of Southern Denmark.
