= Skamby =

Human settlement in Denmark

- Village
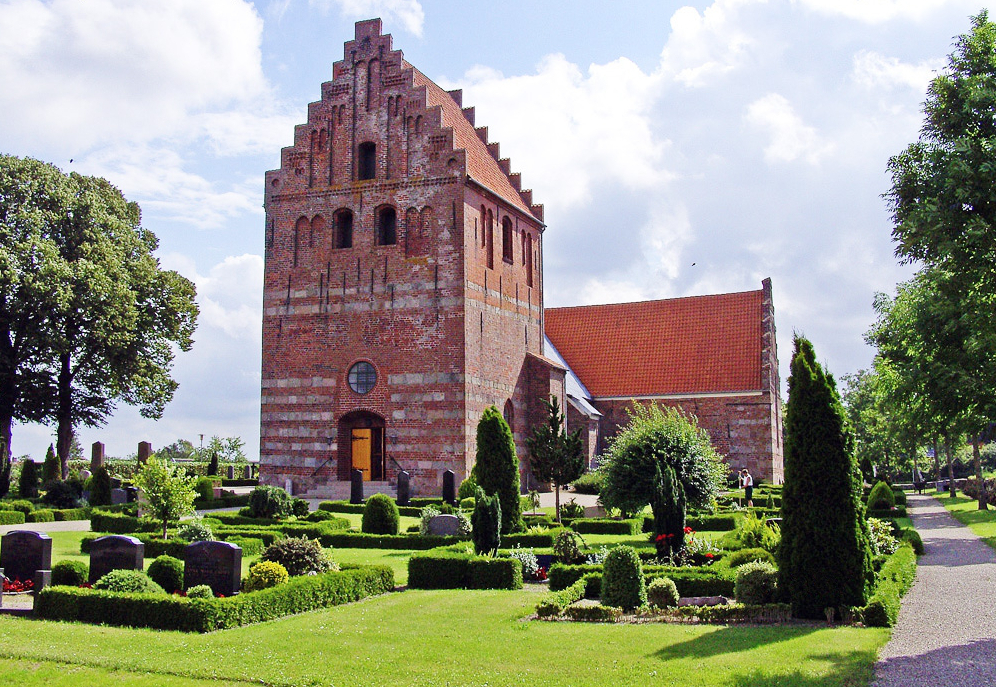
- Skamby Church

- Location in Region of Southern Denmark Skamby (Denmark)
- Coordinates: 55°31′10″N 10°16′25″E
- Country: Denmark
- Region: Southern Denmark
- Municipality: Nordfyn Municipality

Population (2026)
  - Total: 427

Skamby is a village, with a population of 427 (1 January 2026), in Nordfyn Municipality on the danish island of Funen. It is located 6 km north of Søndersø.

== Notable people ==
- Hans Peder Steensby (1875 in Steensby, near Skamby – 1920) an ethnographer, geographer and professor
- Petra Petersen (1901 in Nørre Højrup near Skamby – 1989) a Danish politician and an active member of the Danish resistance movement in World War II
- Lis Lene Nielsen (1951) a footballer who was the top goalscorer at the unofficial 1971 Women's World Cup and helped Denmark win the world cup
