= Inger Møller =

Danish silversmith (1886–1979)

- Born: Inger Eleonora Møller; 21 October 1886; Otterup
- Died: 1 October 1979 (aged 92); Bagsværd
- Occupation: Silversmith

Inger Eleonora Møller (1886–1979) was a Danish silversmith whose talents were recognized by Georg Jensen during her apprenticeship. Inspired by Johan Rohde, in 1922 she established her own workshop, creating most of her work to satisfy individual orders rather than as designs for mass production. In 1925, she received a silver medal for the artefacts she had presented at the Paris World Exhibition. Her creations included kitchen utensils, cutlery, pans and milk jugs but she also produced jewellery. On the occasion of her 80th birthday, the Danish Design Museum organized a commemorative exhibition of her work.

== Biography ==
Born on 21 October 1886 in Otterup on the island of Funen, Inger Eleonora Møller was the daughter of the physician Niels Georg Møller (1841–1911) and his wife Harriet Nicoline née Johnsen (1849–1921). She was the younger sister of the chess champion Jørgen Møller.

As several of her relatives had close connections with the silversmith Georg Jensen, when she was 23 Inger Møller became an apprentice at his workshop. In 1921, Jensen promoted her to the rank of silversmith, the only woman to receive such recognition while under apprenticeship in the company. In 1922, she established her own workshop, developing her own style based on the work of Johan Rohde and her colleague Kay Bojesen. Following the evolving trend of functionalism, she successfully presented works to the 1925 Paris Exhibition where she won a silver medal. She is remembered for creating works in a simple, unpretentious style, especially items for everyday use such as pots and pans, jugs, cutlery and other kitchen utensils. She also created jewellery. She maintained her workshop until 1966, showing no interest in designing for mass production. Instead she produced her own creations, perhaps not making much money but nevertheless happy with her work. She belonged to the old school with customers coming to her workshop and ordering the items she was to design. They did not just come in and take something home but took possession of a work of art with which they had a personal relationship. While most of her works were sold in her own workshop, items were also available at Haandarbejdets Fremme and at Den Permanente Udstilling.

Møller's work was presented at several major exhibitions, including the 1937 Paris Exhibition (winning a gold medal), the 1939 New York World's Fair and the Triennale di Milano (1951). On the occasion of her 80th birthday the Danish Design Museum presented a commemorative exhibition in her honour.

Inger Møller died in Bagsværd on 1 October 1979.
