= Dræet =

- Island
- Location within Denmark
- Coordinates: 55°36′10″N 10°10′24″E
- Country: Denmark
- Municipality: Nordfyn municipality

Area
  - Total: 0.28 km^{2} (0.11 sq mi)

Population
  - Total: 0
  - Density: 0.0/km^{2} (0.0/sq mi)
- Time zone: UTC+1 (CET)
  - Summer (DST): UTC+2 (CEST)

Dræet is a small Danish island off the northern coast of Funen and south of Æbelø, located in Nordfyn municipality. The island covers an area of 0.28 km^{2} (0.11 sq mi). It has been uninhabited since 1960, but there are still remains of buildings on the island. It was purchased by the Aage V. Jensen Funds in 1995 and is protected.
