= Vognsild =

Coordinates: 56°45′19″N 09°25′13″E

- Village
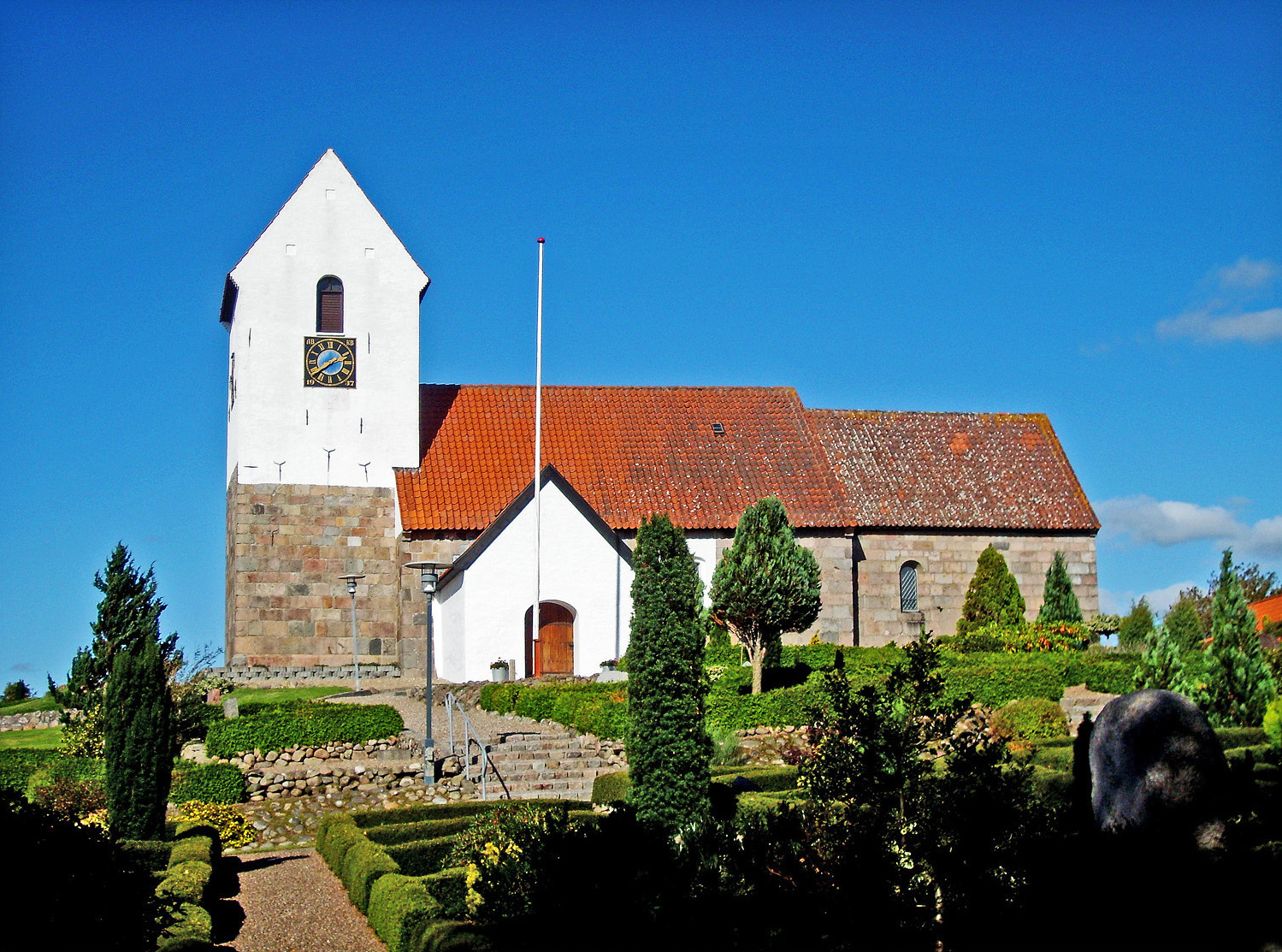
- Vognsild Church

- Location within Denmark
- Country: Denmark
- Region: North Denmark (Nordjylland)
- Municipality: Vesthimmerland

Population (2026)
  - Total: 218
- Time zone: UTC+1 (Central Europe Time)
  - Summer (DST): UTC+2
- Postal code: 9600
- Website: http://www.vognsild.dk/

Vognsild is a village in western Himmerland with a population of 218 (1 January 2026), located six kilometers east of Farsø and nine kilometers west of Aars. The nearest village is Østrup four kilometers east of Vognsild. The village is located in the North Denmark Region and belongs to Vesthimmerland Municipality. The village has a church and a club house. Vognsild also has a sports and ball club.

Under King Christian X's monogram the text reads: NOW IT IS SPRING AND DENMARK IS FREE BLESSED BY THE LORD FROM SOUND TO DUNE. 5 MAY 1945 M.N.
