= Uggerslev =

Village on the island of Funen, Denmark

- Village
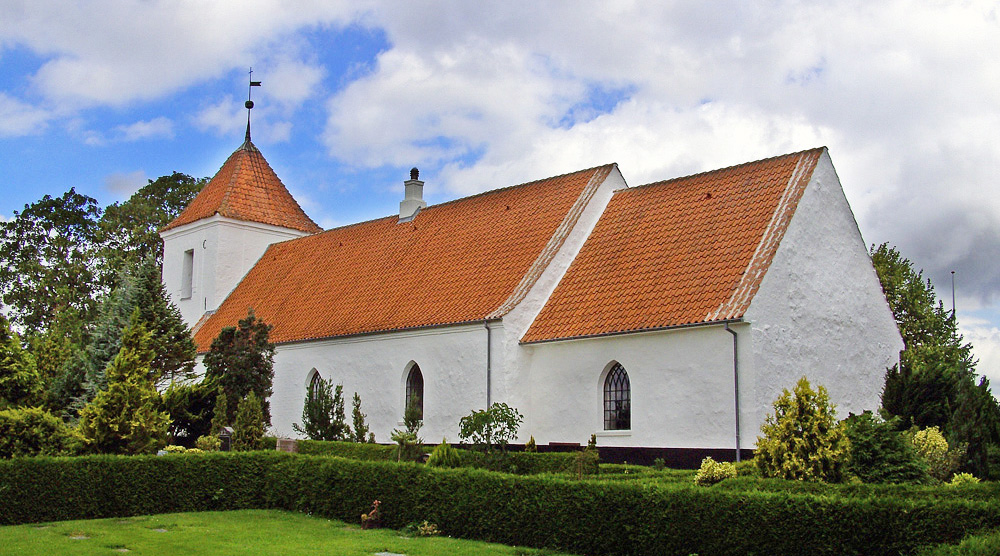
- Uggerslev Church

- Location in Region of Southern Denmark Uggerslev (Denmark)
- Coordinates: 55°31′56″N 10°18′23″E
- Country: Denmark
- Region: Southern Denmark
- Municipality: Nordfyn Municipality

Population (2026)
  - Total: 337

Uggerslev is a village in Nordfyn Municipality on the island of Funen, Denmark, with a population of 337 (1 January 2026). It is located 18 km north of Odense and 6 km west of Otterup.
