= Andreas Rosendahl =

Danish chess player

Andreas Cristian Rosendahl (1864 – 7 January 1909) was a Danish chess master.

He won at Copenhagen 1895, took 4th at Stockholm 1897 (the 1st Nordic Championship, Sven Otto Svensson won), and tied for 3rd–4th at Copenhagen 1899 (the 2nd Nordic-ch, Jorgen Moeller won).
