= Allan K. Pedersen =

Danish businessman and sports team owner (born 1962)

Allan Kim Pedersen
- Born: 7 February 1962 (age 64); Veflinge, Søndersø, Denmark
- Occupations: Businessman; Owner of: F.C. Nordsjælland
- Spouse: Bente Pedersen
- Children: Daniel and Carina

Allan Kim Pedersen (born 7 February 1962) is a Danish businessman and sports team owner. He holds a controlling stake in Danish Superliga team F.C. Nordsjælland.

== Biography ==
Allan K. Pedersen grew up on a small farm in Veflinge, a small parish in the Søndersø municipality, with his two younger brothers. His mother died while he was of a young age. Pedersen went to high school in Middelfart, before leaving for military service. He would later leave to pursue a career in insurance and investment.

Currently lives in Farum with his family. Where his son is coaching the FCN under 17 squad.

== Business history ==
A one time chairman of Københavns Fondsbørs (English: Copenhagen Stock Exchange), Pedersen was also involved with Akademisk Boldklub, a football club based in Gladsaxe, Copenhagen, as vice-chairman. He was one of three major shareholders, before taking up the role in 2000. His involvement included, but not limited to, sponsorship agreements and contract negotiations.

Pedersen is involved with a diverse selection of Danish investments which include hotel services, industry, travel, sports, food and medicine, of which 10 or more he is chairman or a board member of. He is also vice-chairman of the Divisionsforeningen (English: The Danish League), where he was on the board before taking over the role in 2008, replacing Niels-Christian Holmstrøm.

== Sports ownership ==
=== F.C. Nordsjælland ===
Allan K. Pedersen started investing in FCN when the club was in financial difficulty, before buying further shares to gain ownership in the club with holding company AKP Holding with himself as director and his wife Bente Pedersen, as chairman. During his initial time as chairman of FCN, he would control many aspects of the club, including player purchases and sales, as well as scouting and talent development. Gradually delegating these responsibilities to then head coach Morten Wieghorst and sports director Jan Laursen.

In October 2008, Allan K. Pedersen sold F.C. Nordsjælland from AKP Holding to himself for a reported 500,000 Danish kroner, shortly before his holding company went bankrupt. A price Pedersen denies. Following an investigation from his creditors, it was found the sale was forced through without the bank's consent, and that the value for which the club was sold was too low, which ultimately reduced the finances the creators received for the sale. FCN was reevaluated to be worth 35 million kroner at the time of sale. The case has gone to supreme court, but it could still take 1–4 years to resolve.
