= Bogense Municipality =

Former municipality of Denmark

Coordinates: 55.5660°N 10.0966°E

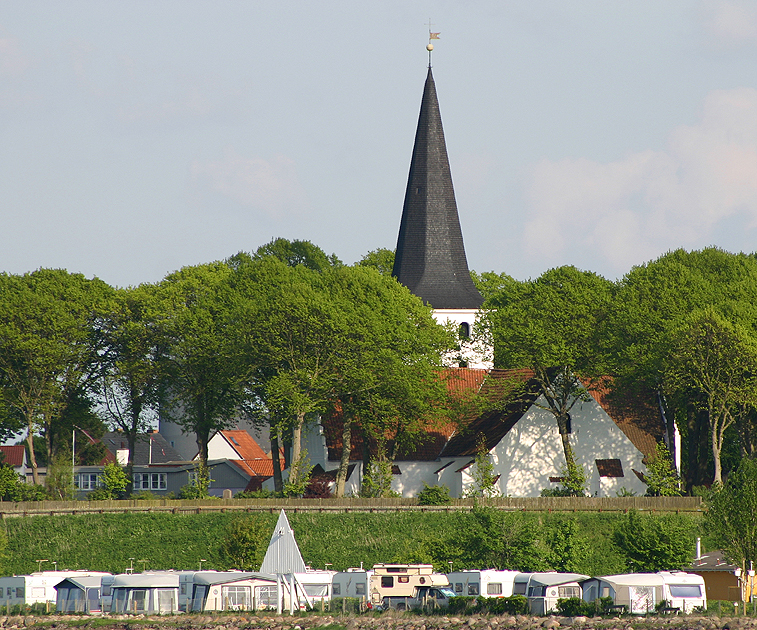
St Nicholas Church (Sankt Nikolaj kirke) in Bogense

Until 1 January 2007 Bogense municipality was a municipality (Danish, kommune) in Funen County on the north coast of the island of Funen in central Denmark. The municipality included a number of small islands in the Kattegat (Dræet Ø, Æbelø) off its northwest coast, and covered an area of 102 km^{2}. It had a total population of 6,448 (2005). Its mayor was Arne Kruse, a member of the Social Democrats (Socialdemokraterne) political party. The main town and the site of its municipal council was the town of Bogense.

Bogense municipality ceased to exist as the result of Kommunalreformen ("The Municipality Reform" of 2007), merging with former Søndersø and Otterup municipalities to form the new Nordfyn municipality. This created a municipality with an area of 451 km^{2} and a total population of 28,655 (2005). The new municipality belongs to the Region of Southern Denmark ("South Denmark Region").

It was originally planned that the new entity should have continued the name Bogense but this decision was overturned by a local referendum in June 2006. This result was later approved by Danish Interior Minister, Lars Løkke Rasmussen.
