= Ejlinge =

Island in Denmark

Coordinates: 55°36′N 10°12′E

Ejlinge's location in Kattegat

Ejlinge is a small, currently uninhabited Danish island located close to Æbelø off the north coast of Funen, 8 km (5 mi) north-east of Bogense. It has an area of 16 hectares and only reaches a height of 4 metres (13.1 ft) above sea level. To the east the island is a glacial moraine whereas the western part consists of coastal meados with a rich bird life.

The western part of the island was under cultivation until 1994. There is a farmhouse on the island which was built in 1875. There is a house on the island. The island is connected to the Lindø peninsula by an approximately 1-kilometre-long (0.6 mi) tidal road.

== See also ==
- List of islands of Denmark
