= Aase Hansen (actress) =

Danish actress (1935–1993)

- Born: 13 January 1935; Søndersø, Funen, Denmark
- Died: 25 February 1993 (aged 58)

Aase Hansen (January 13, 1935 – February 25, 1993) was a Danish actress.

She was born in Vigerslev in Søndersø. Hansen studied with Paula Illemann Feder and at the school of the Odense Teater from 1953 to 1956. In 1955, she played the role of Minna in the play Frisøndag. She performed in various plays at the Andelsteatret (1957–58), the Aalborg Teater (1958-62), the Dansk Skolescene and the Fiolteatret (from 1968).

Hansen went on to appear in seven films. She also appeared in several Danish television series including Fiskerne, Matador and Dr. Dip.

She received the Robert Award for Best Actress in a Supporting Role in 1985 for her performance in Tro, håb og kærlighed.

== Films ==
- Støv for alle pengene (1963)
- En ven i bolignøden (1965)
- Ta' det som en mand, frue (1975)
- Tro, håb og kærlighed, English version Twist and Shout (1984)
- Isolde (1989)
- Sirup (1990)
- Det Forsømte Forår, English version Stolen Spring (1993)
