= Morud =

- Town
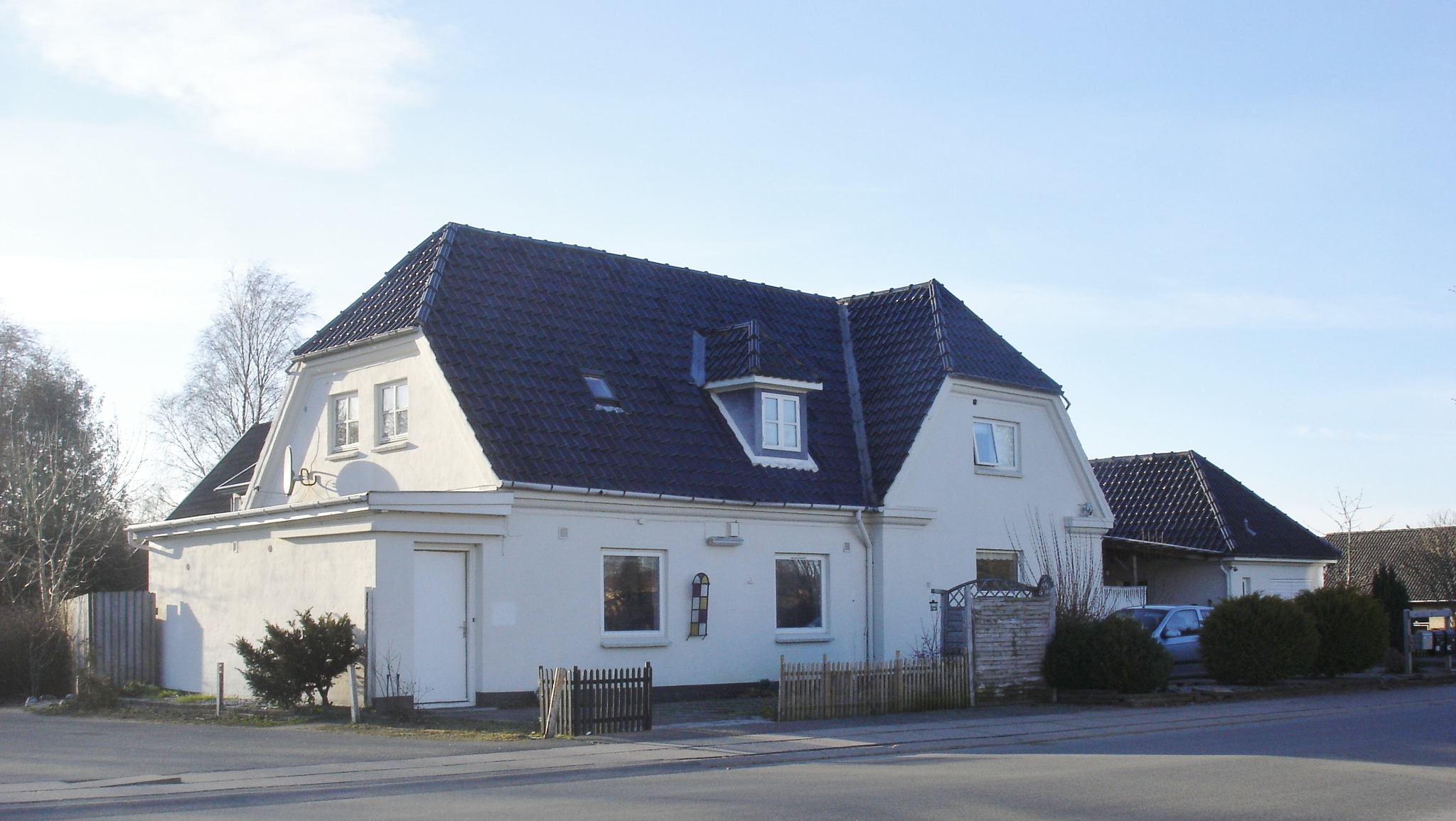
- Former train station

- Location in the Region of Southern Denmark
- Coordinates: 55°26′56″N 10°11′17″E
- Country: Denmark
- Region: Southern Denmark
- Municipality: Nordfyn

Area
  - Urban: 1.6 km^{2} (0.62 sq mi)

Population (2026)
  - Urban: 1,972
  - Urban density: 1,200/km^{2} (3,200/sq mi)
- Time zone: UTC+1 (CET)
  - Summer (DST): UTC+2 (CEST)

Morud is a town located on the island of Funen in south-central Denmark, in Nordfyn Municipality. It is the fourth largest town in Nordfyn Municipality after Otterup, Bogense and Søndersø.

== Notable people ==
- Dan Jørgensen (born 1975), Danish politician.
- Lars Simonsen (born 1963), Danish actor.
