= Petra Petersen =

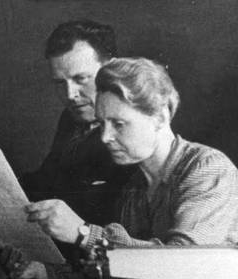
Petra Petersen with Alfred Lunde (1945)

Petra Maria Petersen née Andersen (1901–1989) was a Danish politician who, under the German occupation of Denmark in World War II, was a Danish resistance fighter. She was one of the most active organisers in the communist resistance movement around Odense until the end of the war.

== Early life ==
Born on 2 March 1901 in Nørre Højrup near Skamby on the island of Funen, Petra Maria Andersen was the daughter of Niels Andersen (1845–1920), a schoolteacher, and Rasmine Andersen (1859–1937). She grew up as one of 10 children in a radical home to the northwest of Odense. After leaving school, she worked for seven years as an office assistant.

In 1925, Petersen married Alex Petersen with whom she had a child the same year. She then spent the next few years at home, taking an interest in communist ideology. After joining the Danish Communist Party in 1935, she helped to provide support for the Spanish Popular Front during the Spanish Civil War. In June 1941, she was arrested by the Danish police but was released three weeks later on condition she avoided political activities.

== Resistance member ==
Nevertheless, under the code name Lars, she became an active member of the resistance, organizing communist resistance members in Odense and its surroundings. She helped to publish and distribute the illegal communist paper Land og Folk and was one of the founders and main contributors of Trods Alt, the monthly communist magazine first published in July 1942. She typed up the articles while her husband and her 14-year-old daughter duplicated the pages. After the Freedom Council was established in September 1943, she became a member of the local committee in Odense. From March 1944, when the Gestapo developed an interest in her and her family, she went underground but continued to work for the resistance until the end of the war, becoming one of the most important resistance players in the area despite the fact that she was a woman.

== Post-war activities ==
Her political activities continued after the war in her position as chairman of the Odense communist division. In 1945, she was one of the 18 communists and one of the first three women in the party who were elected to the Folketing. There she served on the party's central committee until 1960. Her duties included a visit to China and several to the Soviet Union. In Denmark, she focused on improvements to legislation on pregnancy and children. She maintained her faith in communism for the rest of her life.

Petra Petersen died in Himmelev on 25 February 1989.
