= Carl Christensen (executioner) =

Danish executioner

Carl Peter Herman Christensen (13 August 1869 in Særslev – 9 October 1936) was the last executioner (skarpretter) in office for the government of Denmark. He was hired by justice minister, Peter Adler Alberti and held the office from 27 August 1906 until 1 April 1926.

He never conducted any executions. His predecessor, Jens Carl Theodor Seistrup, was the last active executioner in office in Denmark.
