= Hans Peder Steensby =

Danish ethnographer and geographer

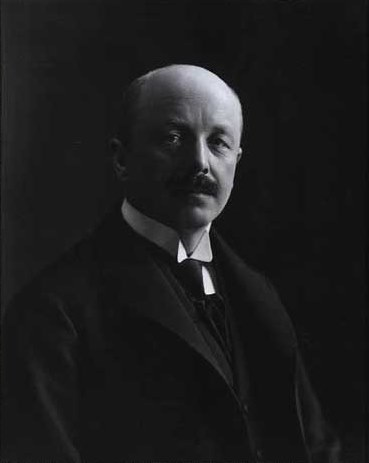
Hans Peder Steensby

Hans Peder Steensby (25 March 1875, Steensby, Skamby Sogn, Funen Island – 20 October 1920, aboard ship Frederik VIII) was an ethnographer, geographer and professor at the University of Copenhagen.

== Career ==
Steensby was born into a family of farmers. His original name was Hans Peder Jensen, but in 1902 he changed his name to Steensby, the name of the parish where he was born. After completing his education in 1900 he moved to Copenhagen and became a teacher. In 1908 he travelled to Algeria and Tunisia, where he studied the culture of the nomads. In 1909 he lived among the Greenlandic Inuit of the Cape York area. In 1911 he became professor of geography at the Copenhagen University. In 1913 he made a research trip to Egypt and the Anglo-Egyptian Sudan.

During the last years of his life he became interested in the Vinland sagas and came up with a new hypothesis. He traveled to Canada in 1920 in order to further research the matter, but died a sudden death on the journey back.

Steensby never married. He was buried at the graveyard of his hometown.

== Works ==
This is a selection of his works:

- Om Eskimokulturens Oprindelse (About the origins of Eskimo culture, Dissertation, 1905),
- Foreløbige Betragtninger over Danmarks Raceanthropologi in Meddelelser om Danmarks Anthropologi I, 1907,
- Nogle ethnografiske Iagttagelser fra en Rejse i Algier og Tunis 1908 in Geografisk Tidsskrift, XIX und XX,
- Contributions to the Ethnology and Anthropo-Geography of the Polar Eskimos Meddelelser om Grønland, XXXIV 1910,
- An Anthropological Study of the Origin of the Eskimo Culture : Saertryk af Meddelelser om Gronland Liii, Copenhagen: Lunos, 1916,
- The Norsemen's Route from Greenland to Wineland (1918),
- Indledning til det geografiske Studium ved Københavns Universitet (1920),
- Om de danske Øers geografiske Udvikling (1925, published posthumously)

== Honours ==
The Steensby Inlet in Canada, as well as the Steensby Glacier and Steensby Land in Greenland were named in his honour.

== See also ==
- Gudmund Hatt

== Bibliography ==
- Ole Høiris: Grønlænderne i dansk antropologi før 2.verdenskrig (PDF; 1,96 MB). In Tidsskriftet Grønland 1/1983, pp. 30–46.
- Kraks Blå Bog (1910), p. 412; opslag: Steensby, Hans Peder
