= Tornø =

Island in Denmark

Coordinates: 55°27′29″N 10°29′0″E

Location in Denmark

Tornø (English: Thorn Island) is a small island in the Odense Fjord, roughly 7 kilometres (4.3 mi) northeast of the city of Odense, in Kerteminde Municipality, Funen, Denmark. It covers an area of 21 hectares (52 acres) and is connected to the mainland by a 300 m (980 ft)-long causeway. The first tenant farmer on the island was Hans Eriksen in 1921.

For years the island could only be reached by riding or driving through the shallow waters but after Anders Jørgensen bought the island in 1922, he connected it to the mainland by road so that he could transport shells from the island. The link was completed in 1926. His shell crushing plant has long disappeared but the land is still farmed on Odense Fjord's only inhabited island. The original farm has long been replaced by a modern brick building. As of 2006 the island had a population of 3 people, with 4 people reported in 2014, although the island is inaccessible to the general public. It contains a narrow strip of salt marsh.
