= Leif Davidsen =

Danish author and journalist

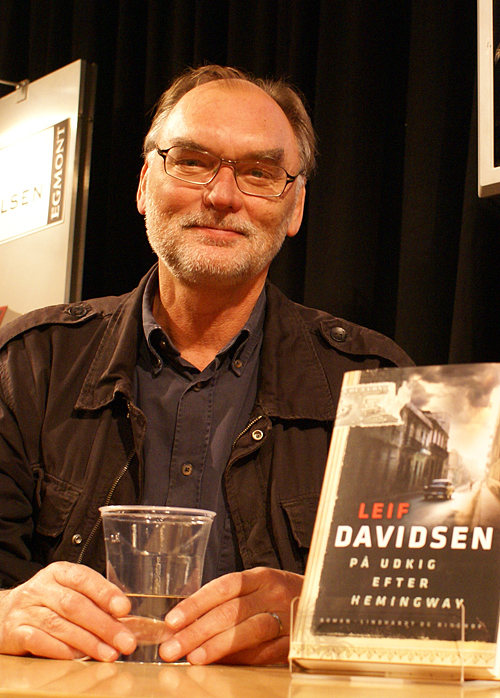
Leif Davidsen presenting På udkig efter Hemingway at the 2008 BogForum in Copenhagen

Leif Davidsen (born 25 July 1950 in Otterup) is a Danish author and journalist.

== Career ==
Educated as a journalist, in 1977 he started working in Spain as a freelance journalist for Danmarks Radio. In 1980 he began covering Soviet news with frequent news reports to Danmarks Radio from Russia. From 1984 to 1988 he was stationed in Moscow. As a journalist he has travelled extensively around the world. When Davidsen returned to Denmark he became chief editor of Danmarks Radio's foreign news desk. From 1996 he edited a TV series called “Danish Dream” about Denmark today. In 1991 he won the Danish booksellers award De Gyldne Laurbær (The Golden Laurel) for his book Den sidste spion. In 1999, he became a full-time writer.

== Principal works ==
Davidsen writes political thrillers, which depict life of modern man in a changing world. Even if many of the characters are of Danish origin, the settings of the stories are often abroad. Davidsen published his first book Uhellige alliancer or The Sardine Deception in 1984. It is a story of intrigue in the Spanish Basque Country shortly after Franco's death. Other works include:

- Den russiske sangerinde (1988) or The Russian Singer set in the period during and after the fall of communism, reflecting the chaos that Russia went through at this time. It tells the story of a Danish diplomat who, caught up in a confusion of murder and corruption, falls in love with a beautiful singer in a Moscow nightclub. The novel was also produced as a film directed by Morten Arnfred in 1993 (dubbed in English).
- Den Sidste Spion (1991) or The Last Spy is about the hunt for a highly placed Russian spy in the Danish administration shortly after the opening of the Berlin Wall.
- Den serbiske dansker: Roman (1996) or The Serbian Dane about a Serbian hit man with roots in Denmark.
- Lime's billede: Roman (1998) or Lime's Photograph is about a Danish photographer living in Spain with historical flashbacks over the last 30 years.
- Fjenden i spejlet (2004) or The Enemy in the Mirror involves the American war on terrorism after the September 11, 2001, attack against the USA.
- Den ukendte hustru (2006) or The Unknown Wife is the story of a Danish couple who are on holiday in Russia when the Russian-born wife suddenly disappears.

== Bibliography ==
- The Woman from Bratislava, Leif Davidsen, translated by Barbara J. Haveland, Arcadia/EuroCrime, 2009, ISBN 978-1-906413-35-4
- The Serbian Dane, Leif Davidsen, translated by Barbara J. Haveland, Arcadia, 2007, ISBN 978-1-905147-12-0
- The unholy alliances, Leif Davidsen, translated by Tiina Nunnally & Steve Murray, London, Hale, 1988, originally published as The sardine deception, Seattle : Fjord, 1986, ISBN 0-7090-3369-9
- Lime's photograph, Leif Davidsen, translated by Gaye Kynoch, London, Harvill, 2001, ISBN 1-86046-899-3
- Russian singer, Leif Davidsen, translated by Jorgen Schiott, London, Deutsch, 1991, ISBN 0-233-98729-0
