= Aage Berntsen =

Danish fencer

Personal information
- Nationality: Danish
- Born: 16 May 1885 Særslev, Denmark
- Died: 16 April 1952 (aged 66) Hovedstaden, Denmark

Sport
- Sport: Fencing
- Club: Akademisk Fægteklub

Aage Berntsen (16 May 1885 – 16 April 1952) was a Danish fencer, poet, doctor and artist. He competed in five events at the 1920 Summer Olympics.

He was the son of the Danish prime minister Klaus Berntsen, and his brother was the fencer Oluf Berntsen.

Among his poetry and writings, he is best known for the text for Fynsk Foraar with music by Carl Nielsen.
