= Søndersø Municipality =

Former municipality in Denmark

Coordinates: 55°29′02″N 10°15′18″E

Until 1 January 2007 Søndersø municipality was a municipality (Danish, kommune) in the former Funen County on the island of Funen in central Denmark. The municipality covered an area of 181 km^{2}, and had a total population of 11,234 (2005). Its last mayor was Erik Hansen, a member of the Social Democrats (Socialdemokraterne) political party. The main town and the site of its municipal council was the town of Søndersø.

The municipality was created in 1970 as the result of a kommunalreform ("Municipality Reform") that merged a number of existing parishes:

- Ejlby Parish (Skovby Herred)
- Hårslev Parish (Skovby Herred)
- Melby Parish (Skovby Herred)
- Skamby Parish (Skam Herred)
- Særslev Parish (Skovby Herred)
- Søndersø Parish (Skovby Herred)
- Veflinge Parish (Skovby Herred)
- Vigerslev Parish (Skovby Herred)

Søndersø municipality ceased to exist as the result of Kommunalreformen ("The Municipality Reform" of 2007). It was merged with Otterup and Bogense municipalities to form the new Nordfyn municipality. This created a municipality with an area of 451 km^{2} and a total population of 28,655 (2005). The new municipality belongs to Region of Southern Denmark.
