= Paula Illemann Feder =

Danish actress (1893–1967)

Paula Marie Mathilde Illemann Feder (February 25, 1893 – November 1, 1967) was a Danish actor and educator.

The daughter of Ernst Ferdinand Illemann and Ane Cathrine Jensen, she was born Paula Marie Mathilde Illemann in Copenhagen. She studied at the Royal Danish Theatre school from 1910 to 1912, also studying with Karl Mantzius and Anna Boserup. Her first performance as a student was at the Royal Danish Theatre in 1910; she had her debut at the Odense Teater in 1912; she performed there from 1912 to 1916, from 1927 to 1929 and from 1944 to 1967. In 1916, she went back to Copenhagen, where she performed at the Casino Theatre until 1919 and at the Folketeatret from 1919 to 1927.

From 1930 to 1933, with her husband George Feder, she performed in a series of theatre shows. After that enterprise ended, she continued to perform until 1935, when she left the stage to help her husband with his evangelical work but returned to the stage in 1943. She performed on radio and in the television movies Frisøndag and Erasmus Montanus; she also appeared in two films: I gabestokken in 1950 and Eventyrrejsen in 1960.

She was married three times: first to actor Knud Trappaud Levinsen in 1915, then to actor Svend Borch in 1920 and finally to actor and author Georg Carl Feder in 1933. She had one daughter with Georg Feder. Jette Krista Feder was born in 1933 and lives in Germany today.

Paula Feder taught at the Odense Theater school.

She died at the age of 74.

Her son Knud de Trappaud also became an actor and was shot in an attempt to escape to Sweden by the German SS.
