= Særslev =

Danish village

- Village
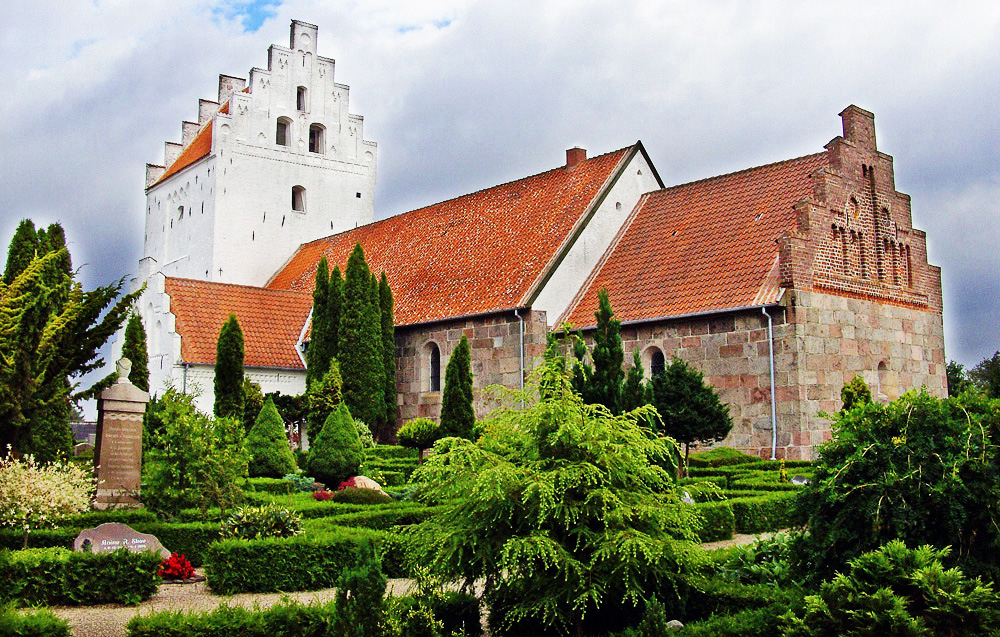
- Særslev Church

- Location in Region of Southern Denmark Særslev (Denmark)
- Coordinates: 55.51211°N 10.17392°E
- Country: Denmark
- Region: Southern Denmark
- Municipality: Nordfyn Municipality

Population (2026)
  - Total: 788
- Time zone: UTC+1 (CET)
  - Summer (DST): UTC+2 (CEST)

Særslev is a village in Denmark with a population of 788 (1 January 2026), located in Nordfyn municipality on the island of Fyn. The village is well known for its gymnastical community and its "efterskole" (boarding school) Nordfyns efterskole.

== Notable people ==
- Carl Christensen (1869 in Særslev – 1936) the last executioner (skarpretter) in office for the government of Denmark; he never conducted any executions.
- Aage Berntsen (1885 in Særslev – 1952) a Danish fencer, poet, doctor and artist; he competed in five events at the 1920 Summer Olympics
