= Jørgen Møller =

Danish chess player (1873–1944)

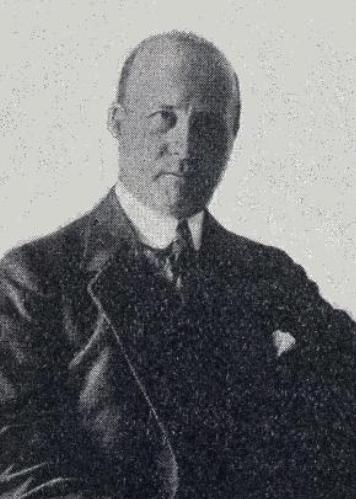
Møller, c. 1920

Jørgen Møller (4 November 1873 – 20 November 1944) was a Danish chess master.

Møller was twice a Nordic Champion, winning at Copenhagen 1899 (2nd Nord-ch) and at Gothenburg 1901 (3rd Nord-ch).

At the beginning of his career, he tied for 4-5th at Copenhagen 1895 (Andreas Rosendahl won), took 2nd, behind Sven Otto Svensson, at Stockholm 1897 (1st Nordic-ch), and took 4th at Copenhagen 1907 (6th Nord-ch, Paul Leonhardt won).

In 1920, he tied for 13–14th in Gothenburg (Richard Réti won). In 1923, he took 6th in Copenhagen (Aron Nimzowitsch won).

His name is attached to the Møller Attack in the Giuoco Piano (1.e4 e5 2.Nf3 Nc6 3. Bc4 Bc5 4.c3 Nf6 5.d4 ed4 6.cd4 Bb4+ 7.Nc3 Nxe4 8.0-0 Bxc3 9.d5) and the Møller Defense in the Ruy Lopez (1.e4 e5 2.Nf3 Nc6 3. Bb5 a6 4.Ba4 Nf6 5.0-0 Bc5).

Møller was born 4 November 1873 in Otterup, Denmark, and died 20 November 1944 in Copenhagen.
