= Vigelsø =

Island in Denmark

Coordinates: 55°28′N 10°28′E

Vigelsø's location in Odense Fjord

Vigelsø is a small, uninhabited island in Odense Fjord, off the coast of Funen, Denmark. With an area of 132 hectares (330 acres), it is the largest island in the fjord and an important breeding ground for waterfowl and rest stop for migratory birds. It is part of the Special Area of Conservation No. SPC 94, Odense Fjord under the EU Habitat and Birds Directives.

== History ==
Archeological findings have documented human activity on the island from the earliest times. Originally the island was a 66-hectare glacial moraine island separated from the smaller islands of Store and Lille Ægholm to the south by a shallow-watered area. In 1873 this area was reclaimed and the island's size was roughly doubled.

In 1990 the Danish Ministry for the Environment acquired the island to conduct ecological restoration and reforestation.

== Vigelsø today ==
Vigelsø is a low-lying island with its highest point, Østerhoved, only reaching six metres above the sea. There is a 25 hectares forest on the northern part of the island while the southern part consists of coastal meadows.

There is a 2.5 km walking trail in the forest, however the southern part is closed to human traffic to protect the bird life which is sensitive to human disturbance. The birds can be observed from an observation tower and a hide. There is a primitive camp site on the island.

== See also ==
- List of islands of Denmark
