= Sven Otto Svensson =

Swedish chess player

Sven Otto Svensson was a Swedish chess master.

He won in the 1st Nordic Chess Championship at Stockholm 1897, took 3rd at Stockholm 1905 (the 5th Nordic-ch), took 11th at Stockholm 1906 (Ossip Bernstein and Carl Schlechter won), and took 5th at Copenhagen 1916 (Paul Johner won).
