= Veflinge =

- Village
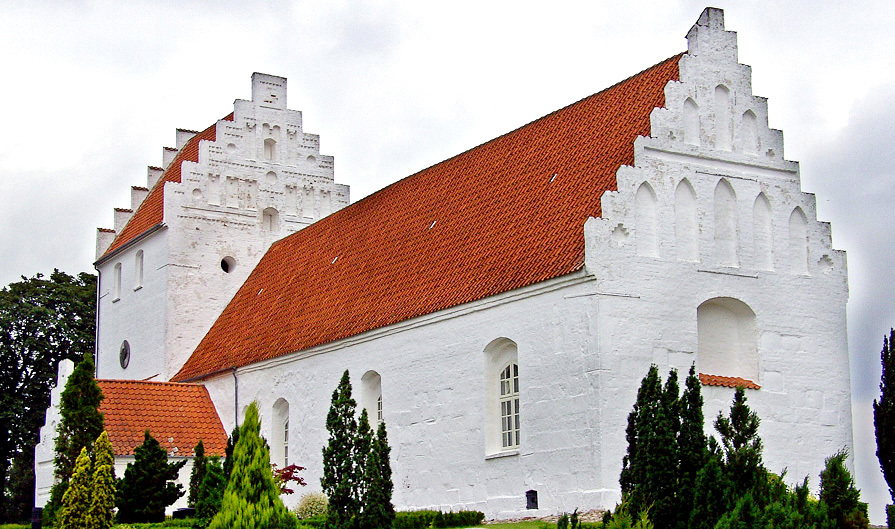
- Veflinge Church

- Location in Region of Southern Denmark Veflinge (Denmark)
- Coordinates: 55°28′26″N 10°9′35″E
- Country: Denmark
- Region: Southern Denmark
- Municipality: Nordfyn Municipality

Population (2026)
  - Total: 864

Veflinge is a village, with a population of 864 (1 January 2026), in Nordfyn Municipality, Region of Southern Denmark in Denmark. It is situated on the island of Funen 6 km northwest of Morud, 7 km west of Søndersø, 20 km northwest of Odense and 13 km southeast of Bogense.

Veflinge Church, built in the 12th century, is located to the north in the old part of the village.

== History ==
=== Etymology ===
The name Veflinge is derived from the old Danish word wifl, which means throwing spear. It is believed that this indicates that the terrain has a spear-like shape.

=== The Northwest Funen Railway ===
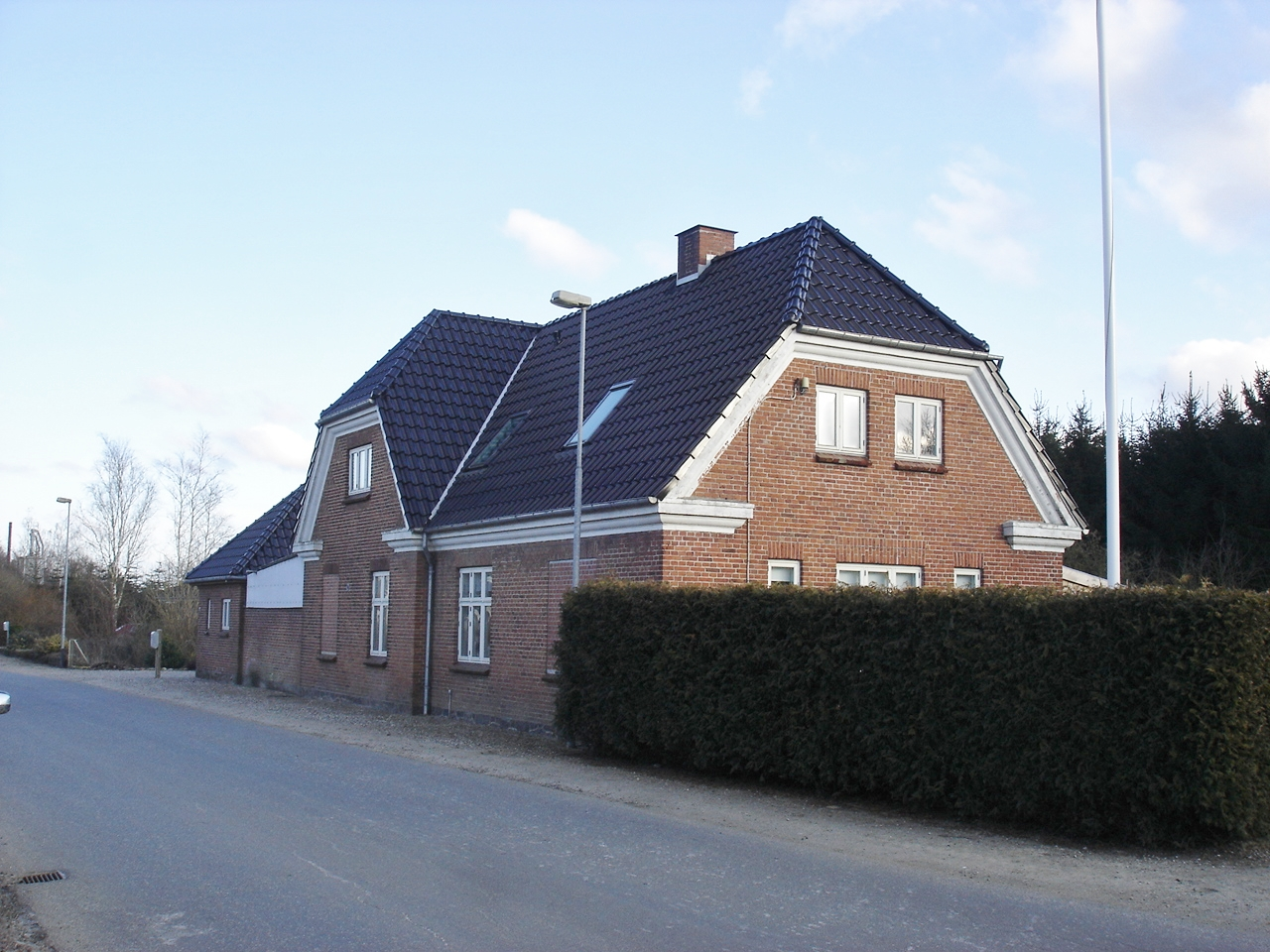
The former stationbuilding in Veflinge

Veflinge was a railway town on the Northwest Funen Railway from 1911–66, when the line was closed. The train station was built about 1 km south of the original village, and the former stationbuilding still remain in existence. The new settlement nearby grew towards the north and later merged with the old village.
