= Odense Fjord =

Fjord in southern Denmark

Coordinates: 55°30′N 10°34′E

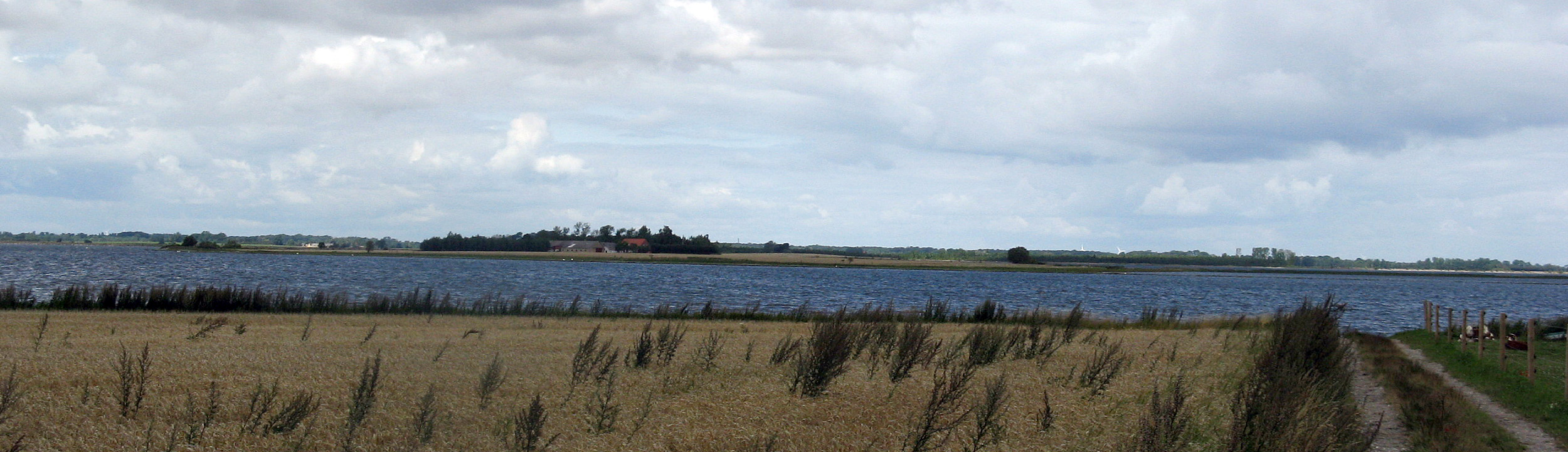
Tornø in the Odense Fjord

Odense Fjord is a 13 km long fjord on the northern part of the Danish island of Funen.

It covers an area of about 63 km^{2}.

== Geography ==
The city of Odense is connected with the fjord through the Odense Canal. The Odense River ends in the fjord at Stige and Seden.

The main islands in the fjord are Vigelsø (133,7 ha) and Tornø (21 ha).

== See also ==
- Odense
- Nakskov Fjord
