= Østrup =

Østrup is a surname. Notable people with the surname include:

- Ernst Østrup (1845–1917), Danish botanist and phycologist, mainly working on diatoms
- Johannes Østrup (1867–1938), Danish philologist and professor
- Lauritz Christian Østrup (1881–1940), Danish fencer
