= Søndersø (town) =

- Town
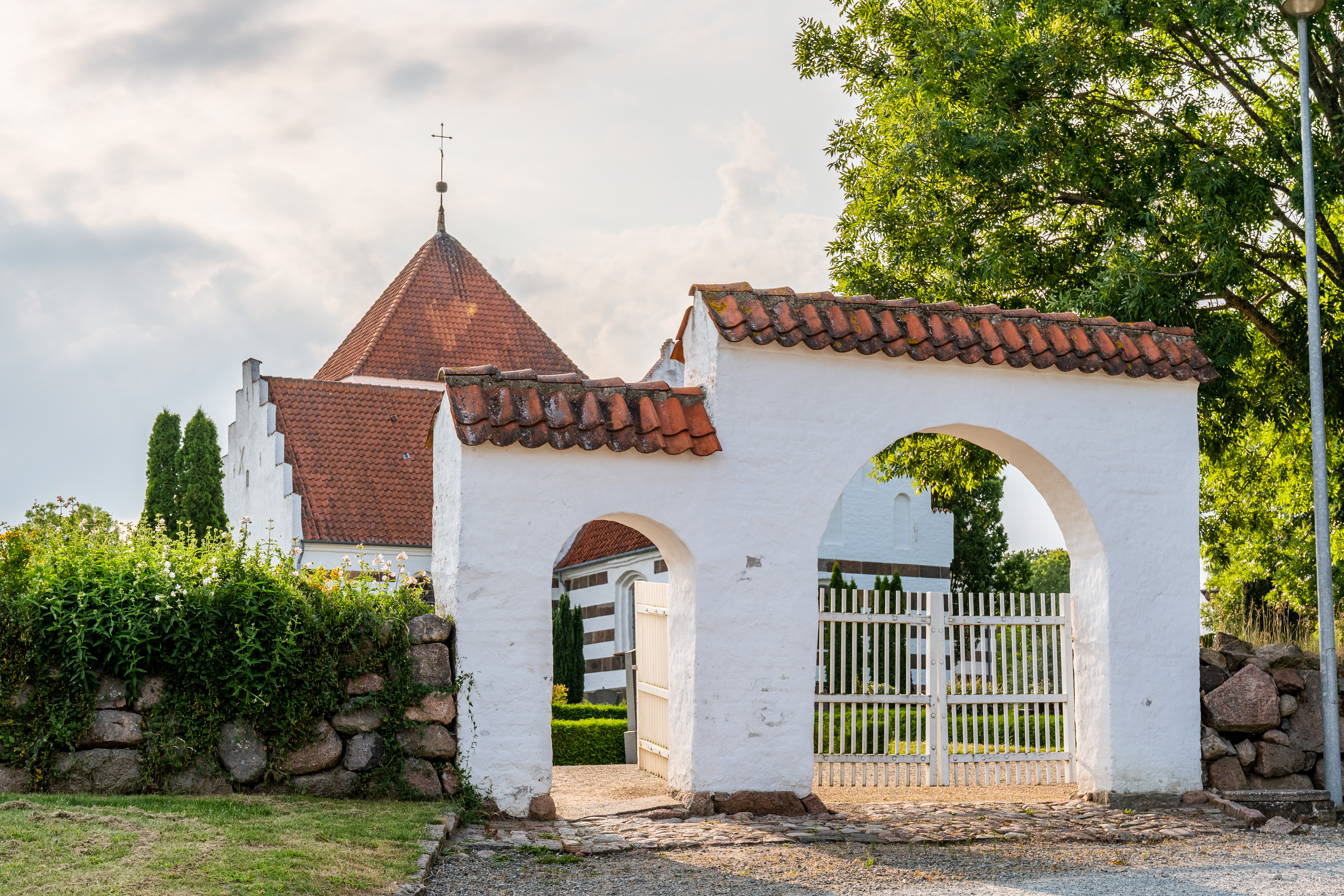
- Søndersø - Photo by: Magnus Asmussen

- Location in the Region of Southern Denmark
- Coordinates: 55°29′8″N 10°15′1″E
- Country: Denmark
- Region: Southern Denmark
- Municipality: Nordfyn

Area
  - Urban: 2.8 km^{2} (1.1 sq mi)

Population (2026)
  - Urban: 3,360
  - Urban density: 1,200/km^{2} (3,100/sq mi)
- Time zone: UTC+1 (CET)
  - Summer (DST): UTC+2 (CEST)

Søndersø is a town in central Denmark with a population of 3,360 (1 January 2026), located in Nordfyn municipality on the island of Funen. It is located 15 km nordwest of Odense and 15 km southeast of Bogense.

== Business ==
The town is home to the following companies:

- Orkla Confectionery & Snacks Danmark (formerly KiMs)
- Heljan A/S
- Tinby A/S
- MT Miljøteknik Aps

== Notable people ==
- Aase Hansen (1935 in Vigerslev in Søndersø – 1993) a Danish actor
- Niels Rasmussen (1922–1991) a Danish rower, competed at the 1948 Summer Olympics
- Allan K. Pedersen (born 1962 in Veflinge, Søndersø) a Danish businessman, holds a controlling stake in FC Nordsjælland
- Nicolaj Møller Madsen (born 1993) a Danish racing driver
