= Æbelø =

Island in Denmark

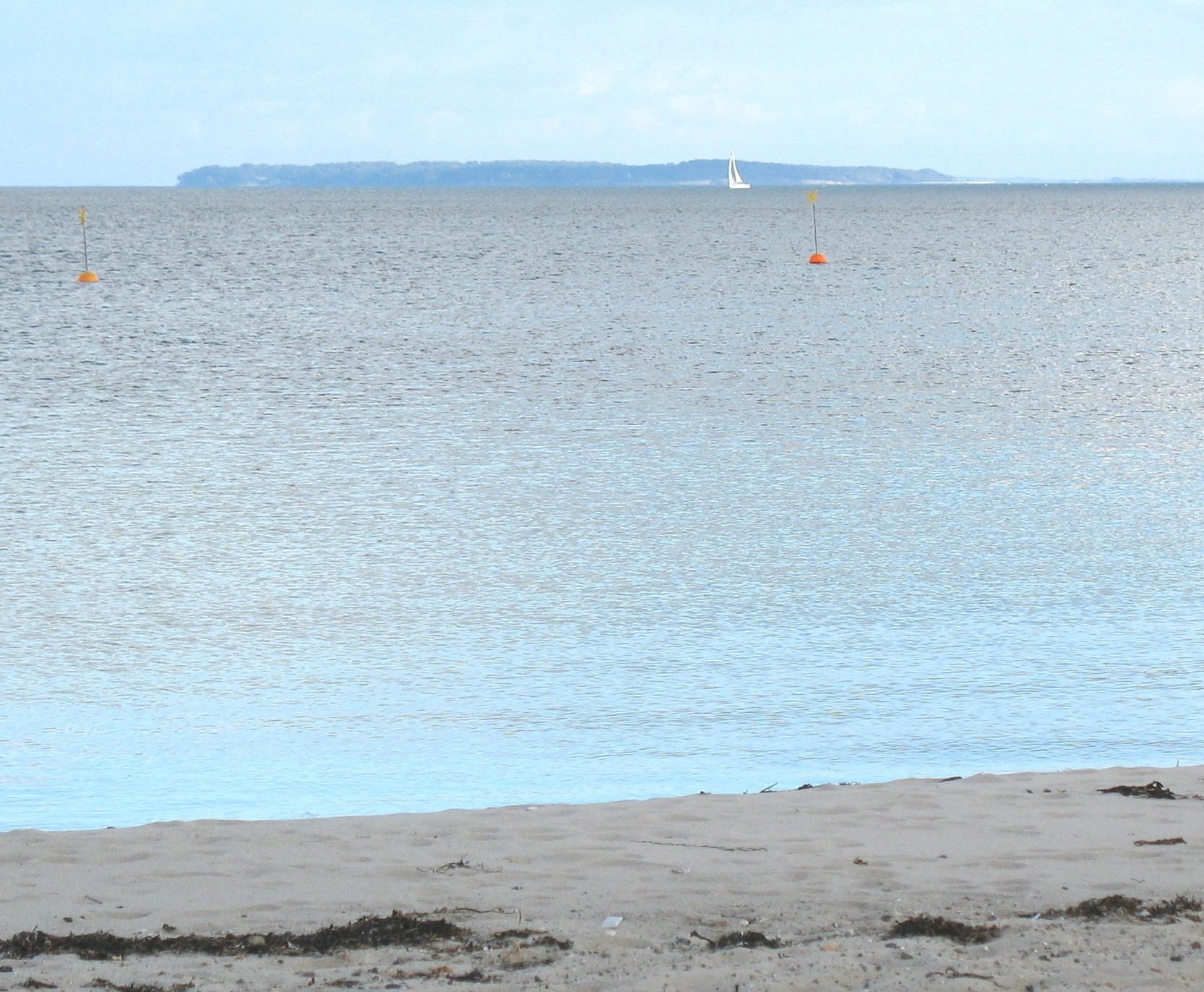
- Æbelø as seen from Juelsminde

- Location within Denmark
- Etymology: Apple island

Geography
- Location: Kattegat
- Coordinates: 55°38′N 10°11′E
- Area: 2.09 km^{2} (0.81 sq mi)

Administration
- Denmark

Demographics
- Population: 0-2

Æbelø (English: apple-island) is a Danish island in the Kattegat, off Funen's north coast. The island covers an area of 2.09 km^{2}. In between the island and Funen, there are 4 smaller islands. Æbelø has 2 inhabitants in the summer, in the winter it is de facto uninhabited. Between 1938 and 1943, the owner of the island was Kaj Dindler.

There is a lighthouse on the island.

The Island is connected to Æbeløholm via a 1,5–2 km sandbar called Brådet, that is periodically submerged.

== Sources ==
- Æbelø Aage V. Jensen Naturfond
- Nationalt Geologisk Interesseområde Æbelø
- Natura 2000-Gebiet Nr. 108 (Æbelø, havet syd for og Nærå)
