= Otterup =

- Town
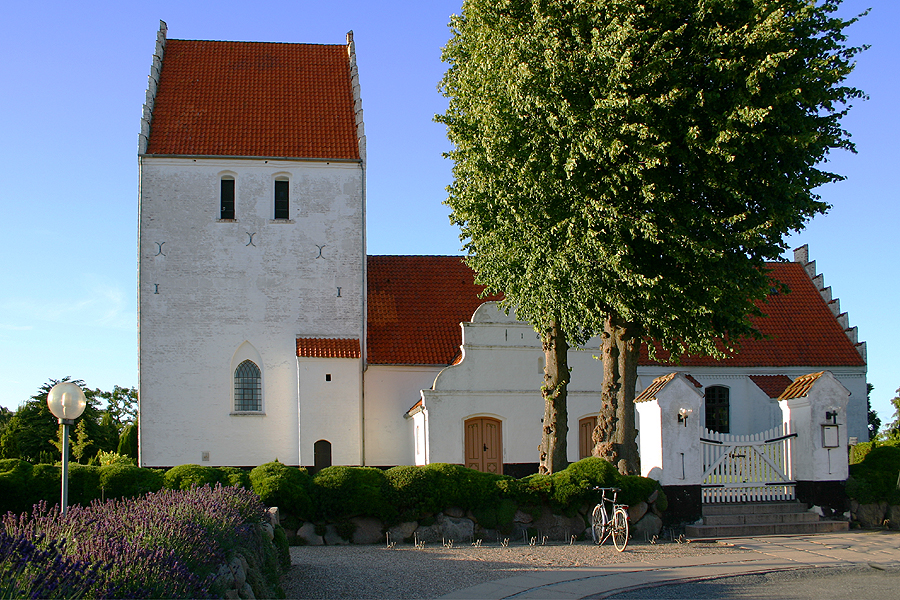
- Otterup church

- Location in Denmark Otterup (Region of Southern Denmark)
- Coordinates: 55°30′55″N 10°23′55″E
- Country: Denmark
- Region: Southern Denmark
- Municipality: Nordfyn

Area
  - Urban: 4 km^{2} (1.5 sq mi)

Population (2026)
  - Urban: 5,264
  - Urban density: 1,300/km^{2} (3,400/sq mi)
  - Gender: 2,509 males and 2,755 females
- Time zone: UTC+1 (CET)
  - Summer (DST): UTC+2 (CEST)
- Postal code: DK-5450 Otterup

Otterup (Danish pronunciation: [ˈʌtəʁɔp]) is a town in central Denmark, located in Nordfyn municipality. It is on the island of Funen, with a population of 5,264 (1 January 2026). Between 1889 and 1994 the Schultz & Larsen rifle factory was working from this small town.

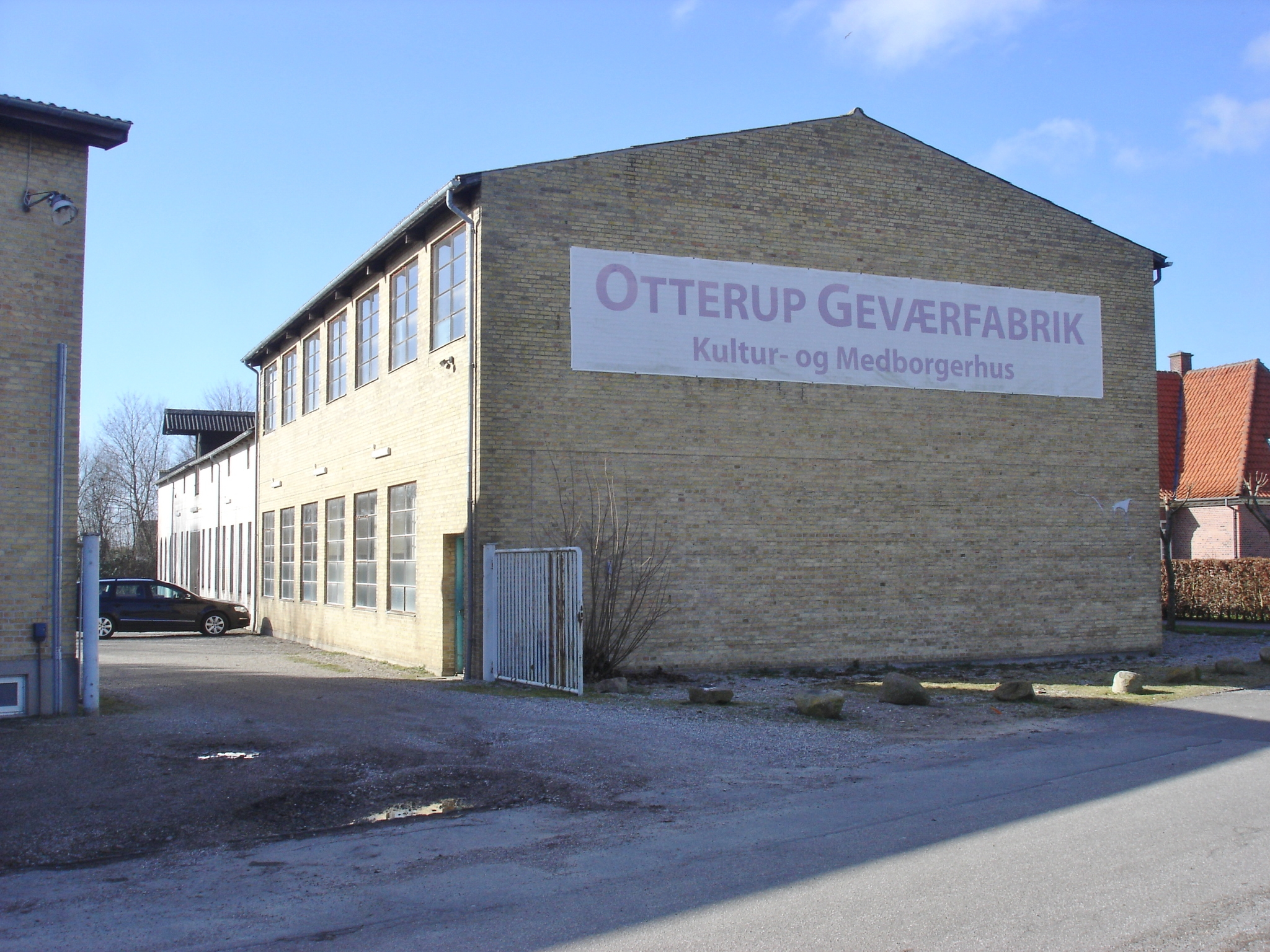
The former rifle factory

== Notable people ==
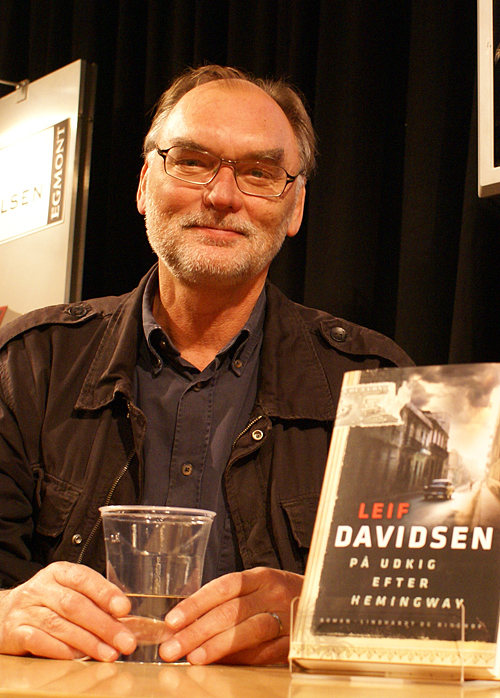
Leif Davidsen, 2008

- Martin Knudsen (born 1871 in Hasmark – 1945) Danish physicist and oceanographer
- Jørgen Møller (1873 in Otterup – 1944) a Danish chess master
- Rudolf Broby-Johansen (1900–1987) an art historian, communist activist and writer; grew up in Lunde, Otterup
- Uffe Schultz Larsen (1921 in Otterup – 2005) a Danish sport shooter, competed in various events at the 1948, 1952, 1956 and 1960 Summer Olympics
- Leif Davidsen (born 1950 in Otterup) a Danish author and journalist
- Patrick Banggaard (born 1994 in Otterup) a Danish footballer who played as a defender for SønderjyskE
