= Carl Jensen =

Carl Jensen may refer to:

- Carl Jensen (boxer) (1909–1991), Danish boxer
- Carl Jensen (painter) (1887–1961), Danish painter and newspaper illustrator
- Carl Jensen (politician) (1920–1988), Minnesota politician
- Carl Jensen (wrestler) (1882–1942), Danish sport wrestler and Olympic medalist
- Carl B. Jensen, U.S. Marine Corps general
- Carl Fredrik Jensen (1855–1929), Norwegian judge and civil servant
- Carl Jóhan Jensen (born 1957), Faroese writer, poet and literary critic
- Carl Oluf Jensen (1864–1934), Danish veterinarian
- Carl Jensen, professor of media studies at Sonoma State College, founder of Project Censored

== See also ==
- Karl Jensen (disambiguation)
