= Christian Ludvig Jensen =

Norwegian politician

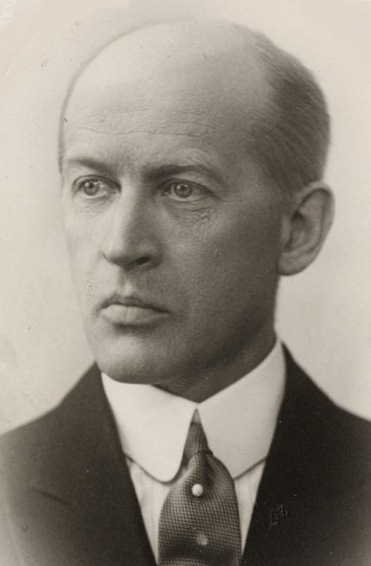
- Born: 17 November 1885; Christiania, Norway
- Died: 4 September 1978 (aged 92)
- Occupations: barrister and politician
- Parent: Carl Fredrik Jensen
- Relatives: Christian Jensen (grandfather)
- Awards: Order of St. Olav

Christian Ludvig Jensen (17 November 1885 – 4 September 1978) was a Norwegian barrister, politician and organizational leader.

He served as mayor of Aker for several years and was elected to the Storting. He chaired the Norwegian Bar Association, and edited the periodical Norsk Retstidende for eighteen years. He chaired the mountaineering association Norsk Tindeklub and the Norwegian Trekking Association.

== Personal life ==
Jensen was born in Christiania to justice Carl Fredrik Jensen and Antonette Christiane Holtermann, and was a grandson of government minister Christian Jensen. He married Signe Holst (née Moestue) in 1923.

== Professional career ==
Jensen graduated as cand.jur. in 1909. He practiced as barrister in Oslo from 1917, with access to work with the Supreme Court.

He was involved in administration of a number of companies, including Akersbanene, Ekebergbanen, Holmenkolbanen, the insurance companies Eidsvold and Glitne, the paper mill Buskerud Papirfabrikk, and the savings bank Akers Sparebank.

Jensen was member of the representative council of Nationaltheatret from 1937, and served as chairman from 1953 to 1962.

From 1946 to 1963 he edited the journal Norsk Retstidende, and chaired the Norwegian Bar Association from 1947 to 1951.

== Political career ==
Jensen was a member of the municipal council of Aker from 1932 to 1947, and mayor of Aker from 1935 to 1940, and again in 1945.

He was elected representative to the Storting for the period 1937–1945, for the Conservative Party.

From May to September 1945 he temporarily served as County Governor of Oslo and Akershus.

== Organizational work ==
Jensen chaired the mountaineering association Norsk Tindeklub from 1926 to 1928. He was a board member of the Norwegian Trekking Association from 1923, served as chairman 1933–1940, and was subsequently member of the council. His contributions to tourism earned him honorary membership of the Norwegian Trekking Association, and he received Svenska Turistföreningen's gold medal. He also chaired Christiania Skiklub from 1961.

He was decorated Knight, First Class of the Order of St. Olav in 1954.

Jensen died on 4 September 1978.
