= Anja Cetti Andersen =

Danish astronomer and astrophysicist (born 1965)

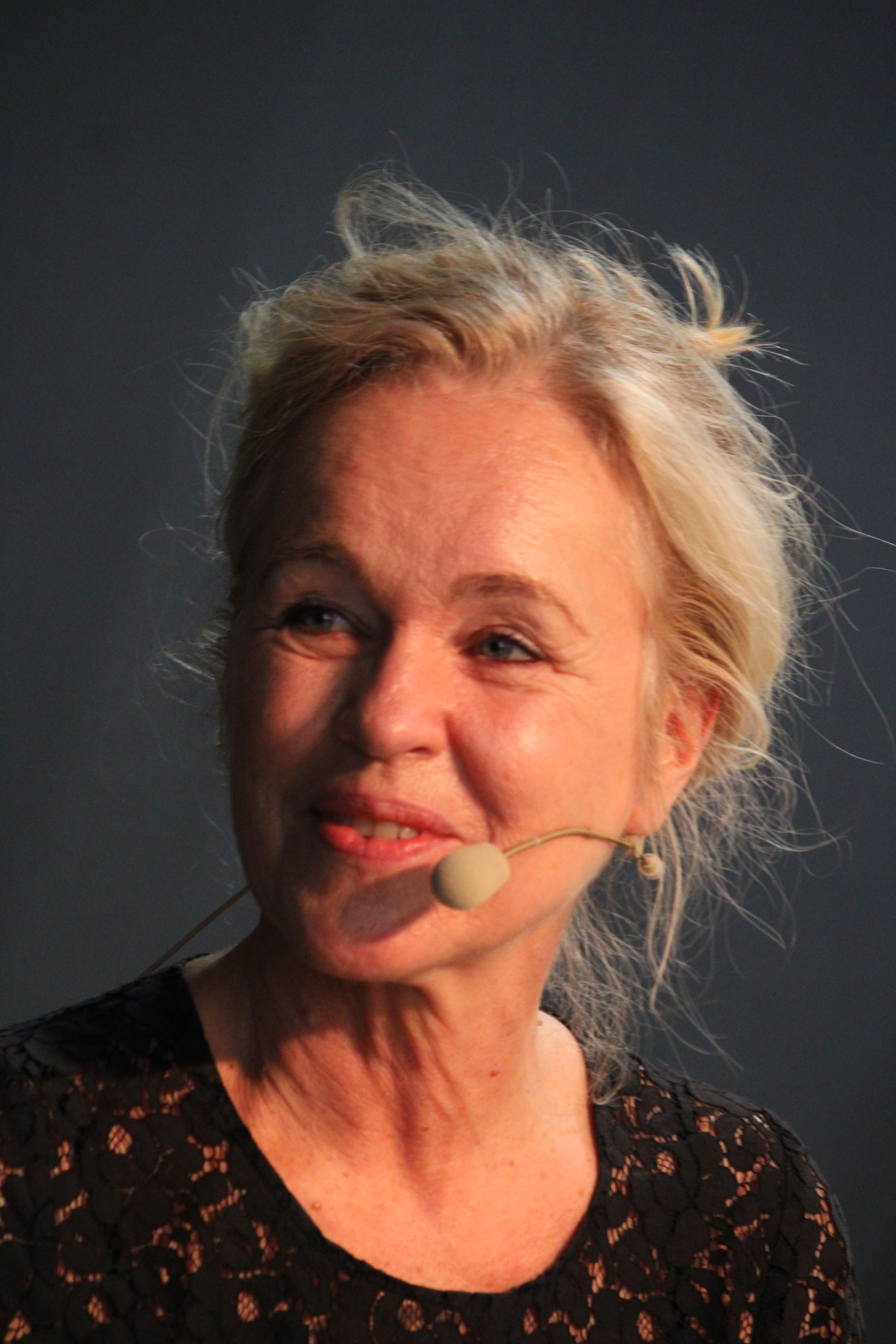
- Andersen in 2025
- Born: 25 September 1965 (age 60); Hørsholm, Denmark
- Education: University of Copenhagen
- Known for: Cosmic dust, planet formation, publishing
- Awards: Descartes Prize; Mathilde Prize; Allan Mackintosh Award
- Scientific career
- Fields: Astrophysics, astronomy, teaching
- Institutions: University of Copenhagen; Niels Bohr Institute

Anja Cetti Andersen (born 25 September 1965) is an astronomer and astrophysicist from Hørsholm, Denmark.

== Life ==
She received her BSc in 1991, MSc in astronomy in 1995, and her PhD in 1999, from the University of Copenhagen. Her thesis was titled "Cosmic Dust and Late-Type Stars". Her postdoctoral research was funded by the Carlsberg Foundation, firstly at the Department of Astronomy & Space Physics, Uppsala University, and then at the Astronomical Observatory at the University of Copenhagen. After this she was funded by her home institution and received a Diploma in Higher Education Teaching and Teaching Practice from the Faculty of Sciences. Her interest in astronomy was kindled when she was in the seventh grade, after a visit to her school from Uffe Grae Jorgensen, a Danish astronomer, and with whom she now works in Copenhagen. She has three children, Julie, Cecilie and Jakob.

== Career ==
Her work concentrates on cosmic dust, and its role "in relation to the formation of complex molecules, stars and planets." She is currently an associate professor at the Niels Bohr Institute, and is part of the management team where she conducts research at the Dark Cosmology Center in Copenhagen. She is a publisher of academic papers, has written several books, and is a lecturer, and also considered one of the best speakers currently using public outreach techniques in order to raise the profile of science in the community. It is characteristic of Anja Andersen's research that she works at the intersection between physics, chemistry, geology and biology. Her early research was involved with presolar grains from meteorites. Working with Susanne Hofner, their research in 2003 showed that "correct micro-physical description of the dust is crucial for predicting the mass loss rates of AGB stars." Her work with Hofner continued, leading to further developments in the understanding of the action of dust-driven wind, and she collaborated with researchers in Uppsala to study "how the optical properties of dust grains change" when they leave a star and move into inter-stellar regions. While she is researching the influence of cosmic dust on early planet formation, she is also working on models of why life on Earth is constructed of left hand twisted amino acids and right hand twisted sugars. There is a hint of the unconventional about Andersen in her interdisciplinary approach to her work, and indeed her method of working. She states that she feels herself to be an "atypical astronomer, because I am in the laboratory much of the times studying the chemical composition of meteorites in order to use that knowledge for theoretical models of how solar systems can be formed".

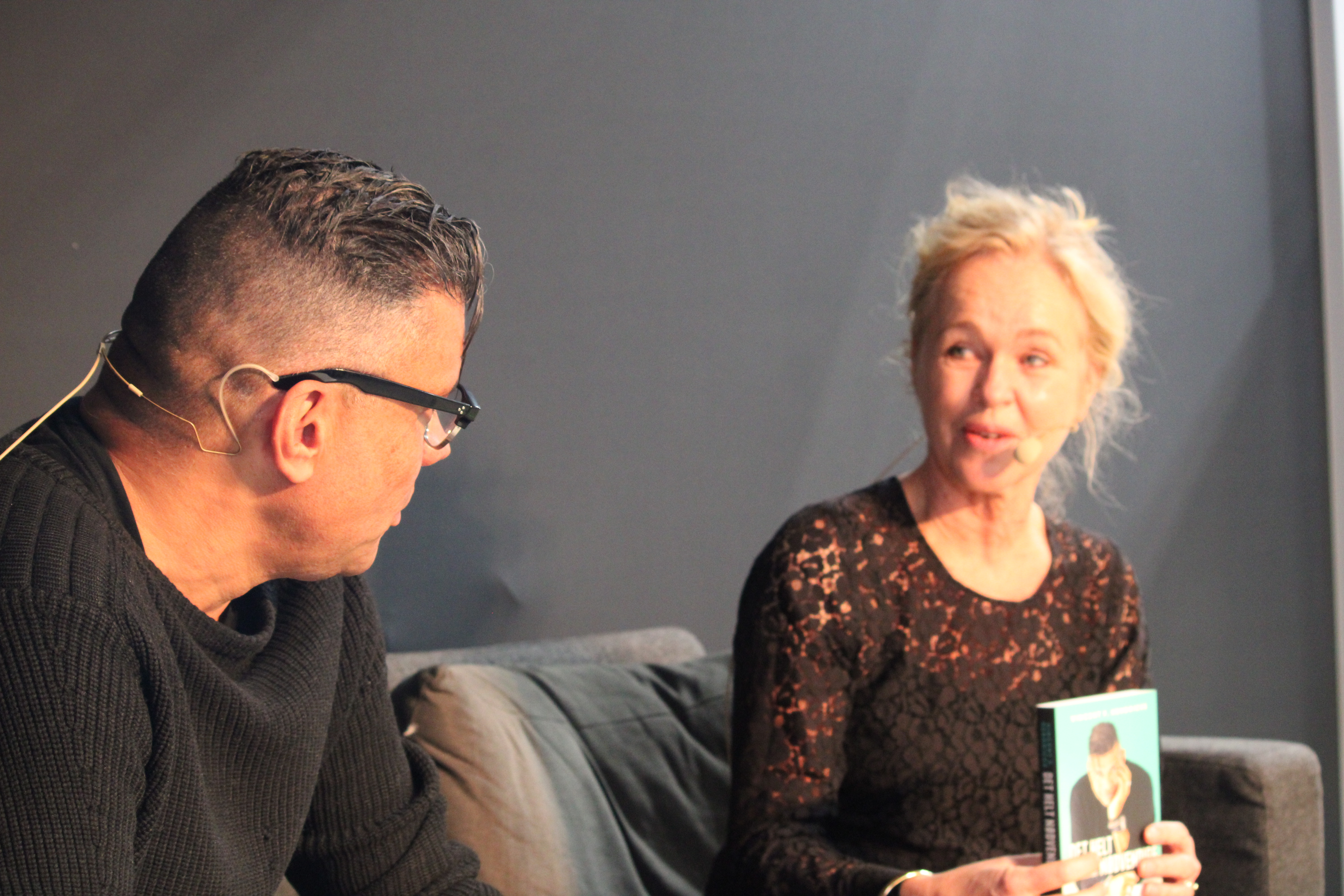
In conversation with Vincent F. Hendricks at Bogforum 2025

She is also an author, working with fellow Dane Peter Clausen to produce works about astronomy which are aimed at the general public. Whilst she is recognized as one of the foremost researchers in her fields, she is also a scientist who believes that "it is important to tell the world and young people in particular about exciting new research". She has written books for children, explaining astronomy to a young audience, as well as "Stjernsov og Galakser" (Starduast and Galaxies), and most recently "Livet er et Mirakel" (Life is a Miracle), with theologist Anna Mejlhede. Many of her awards have been for her teaching ability, and "public outreach", her work in raising the profile of science. She is also an advocate of improving the numbers of women currently in respected positions within science academia, stating at the Djof Conference on Gender Equality in 2007 "I'd rather have a top post, because I'm a woman, and show what I can do, than sit outside the door and never get the chance. For me it does not matter whether you use a whip or a carrot, we just get some action." She explains her work about dark energy and dark matter, cosmic dust and many other matters in astronomy in the following educational video: "Interview with Anja Cetti Andersen – Author, Professor, and Researcher – Copenhagen University". In addition, she has a minor planet named after her, 8820 Anjandersen, alternate designation 1985 VG = 1961 CE1 = 1978 YO1 = 1992 SG24 = 1994 CS1

== Awards ==
- 2016: Awarded the Silver H.C. Ørsted Medal for outstanding dissemination of exact science to broad circles.
- 2011: Awarded Det Naturvidenskabelige Fakultets Formidlingspris (Dissemination Prize) for extraordinary contributions to the public outreach activities of the Faculty,
- 2009: Awarded Svend Bergsøes Fonds Formidlingspris for outstanding public outreach.
- 2009: Awarded Mathilde Prize for contributions towards equality between women and men in academia. The prize is named after Mathilde Fibiger.
- 2008: Awarded The Danish Association of Masters and PhDs research prize "for her unparalleled ability to combine internationally recognized leading edge research with the ability to communicate her research results and create a broad interest for astronomy."
- 2007: Elected member of The Danish Academy of Technical Sciences
- 2006: Awarded the Danish Radio's Rosenkjær Prize for outstanding public outreach.
- 2006: Awarded The Kirstine Meyer Award for outstanding research.
- 2006: Awarded The Outstanding Young Person TOYP 2006 for academic achievement, by JCI – Worldwide Federation of Young Leaders and Entrepreneurs.
- 2005: Awarded The Descartes Prize for Science Communication (laureate) for outstanding excellence in Science Communication, given by the European Union.
- 2004: Awarded The Danish Award for Outstanding Public Outreach (Danmarks Forskningskommunikationspris 2004) by the Danish Ministry of Science, Technology and Innovation
- 2003: Nominated for The Educational Material Prize (Undervisningsministeriets Undervisningsmiddelspris 2003) from the Danish Ministry of Education, for the teaching material Videnskabet, which included the book "Made of Stardust" (Skab af Stjernestøv).
- 2000: Awarded the Allan Mackintosh Award for public outreach by Jette Mackintosh and the Niels Bohr Institute.
- 1999: The program Kosmos, on which Andersen was a presenter, won the Prix Magazine at the 16th International Science-television-festival in Paris. Kosmos was the most popular programs on DR2 in 1998.
- 1997: Awarded Writer of the year (Årets forfatter 1997) by the Danish Astronomical Society (Dansk Astronomisk Selskab).

== Memberships ==
Learned Societies

- Since 2007: The Danish Academy of Technical Sciences
- Since 2003: The International Astronomical Union
- Since 2001: The European Astronomical Society
- Since 1999: Foreningen for Kønsforskning i Danmark
- Since 1997: The European Physical Society
- Since 1996: The Meteoritical Society
- Since 1994: The Danish Physical Society, Dansk Fysisk Selskab
- Since 1993: The Danish Astronomical Society, Dansk Astronomisk Selskab
- In addition she is a Fellow of The Nordic Institute for Theoretical Physics NORDITA, and sits on the Astrophysics and Astrobiology Research Committee.

Network Groups

- Since 2009: VLgruppe 77 – København
- Since 2007: Albrightgruppen.dk
- Since 2005: The Nordic network of women in physics (NORWIP)
- Since 2003: Skeptica.dk
- Since 1999: Women in Physics in Sweden
- Since 1998: Networks of Women Scientists established under the fifth frame work program of EU
- Since 1995: Network for Women in Physics in Denmark
