= Lise Warburg =

Danish textile artist and writer (born 1932)

Inger Lise Warburg née Jensen (born 1932) is a Danish weaver and writer. She has specialized in tapestry using a high-warp loom, coordinating her work with that of various Danish painters including Mogens Andersen and Ole Schwalbe. As a writer, she has published a number of works on textile art, most recently Den strikkende madonna (The Knitting Madonna, 2018), a collection of essays on the cultural history of knitting.

== Early life ==
Born on 6 November 1932 in Copenhagen, Inger Lise Jensen is the daughter of the painter Hans Carl Jensen (1887–1961) Meretha Paulsen (1901-87). She was the elder of two sisters. In 1951, she married the director Niels Erik Warburg with whom she had two children, Emmerik Peter (1952) and Mette Cathrine (1955). The marriage was dissolved in 1964.

She was brought up in a well-to-do home where, thanks to her father, she met painters and cultural players who influenced her interest in art. After attending Den Classenske Legatskole, she completed her schooling at Sortedam Gymnasium. In 1951, she entered the Arts and Crafts School, specializing in fashion and textile arts. Later that year she married and became pregnant. Her husband's work then took the family to Switzerland where a second child was born in 1955. Warburg devoted the following years to her family.

== Career ==
In 1959, on returning to Denmark, she was introduced to tapestry by Thordis Eilertsen who had a studio in Frederiksberg. When Eilertsen died in 1962, Warburg took over her studio where she continued to work until 2002. Her first assignment was to complete a tapestry by Jais Nielsen (1885–1961) for the Aalborg Business School (Handelshøjskolen). In 1963, working with Kamma Svensson (1908–1988), she created Min søster og brud (1963) and later Adam og Eva og skabelsens dage (1982). Collaborating with Mogens Andersen, she produced colourful works during the 1960s for the National Gallery of Denmark, the National Bank and Nordjyllands Kunstmuseum.

In 1966 and 1970, Warburg took courses with the Norwegian knitting expert Helen Engelstad in Oslo, extending her expertise in weaving and colouring. Thereafter she attended a course in chemical colouring at the Geigy School in Basel. Thanks to a scholarship from the National Bank, she was able to spend a year in Paris with the Manufacture Nationale des Gobelins (1971–72). Collaboration with Ole Schalbe led to the tapestry Rød luftspejling, Firenze (1969). Working with Emil Gregersen, she produced a large tapestry for the town hall in Odder.

Warburg has served on the board of Danmarks Designskole (1970–97) and in 1991 became a member of the Centre Internationale d’Etudes des Textiles Anciennes in Lyon, France.

== Publications ==
Lise Warburg has published articles and books on textile art, including:

- 1974: Spindebog
- 1980: Srikkeskeen: et glemt redskab
- 1984: Den strikkende madonna i syd og nord
- 1989: I silkestrik fra top til tå: in knitted silk from top to toe
- 2018: Den strikkende madonna
