= August Hassel =

Danish sculptor (1864–1942)

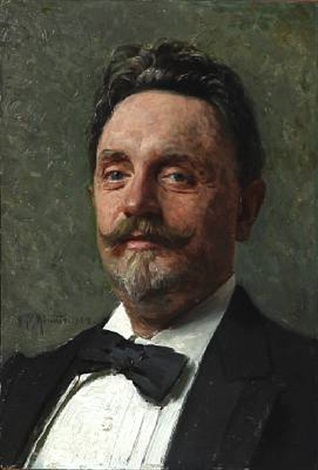
- August Hassel painted by Peder Mørk Mønsted (1908)
- Born: 9 February 1864; Copenhagen, Denmark
- Died: 30 May 1942 (aged 78); Ålsgårde, Denmark
- Resting place: Hellebæk Ny Kirkegård
- Education: Royal Danish Academy of Fine Arts
- Known for: Sculpting

August Christian Valdemar Hassel (9 February 1864 – 30 May 1942) was a Danish sculptor.

== Early life and education ==
Hassel was born in Copenhagen, the son of captain and mechanic Johan Fridolin Hassel and Doris Henriette Eickhoff. He apprenticed under stucco artist and carver H.C. Berg from August 1879 and graduated from Copenhagen Technical College in January 1882. He graduated from the School of Decorative Arts on 25 May 1886. He later continued his training at the Royal Danish Academy of Fine Arts where he studied under Theobald Stein, graduating on 30 January 1888.

== Career ==
Hassel had his debut at the Charlottenborg Spring Exhibition in 1888 with a portrait bust of composer Niels Gade. It was later followed by a number of other portraits. Most of his work was within the area of religious art and he contributed with sculptural works and altarpieces for a number of churches.

== List of works ==
- Niels Gade (1889)
- Memorial to Christian IX (1908) Frederiksberg (with Ludvig Knudsen)
- Crucifix (1900) Fredens Church, Copenhagen
- Memorial to Christian IX (1912) Tirsbjerg
- Bust of Peter Christian Abildgaard (1910) Landbohøjsk
- Bust of Frederik VIII (1819)
- Bust of Queen Louise, dowager queen of Denmark (1913)
- Hans Egede and Gertrud Rask (1921) St. Nicolas' Church, Copenhagen
- Bernhard Bang (1923) University of Copenhagen Frederiksberg Campus
- Crown Prince Frederik and Crown Princess Louise Foundation (1901) Nr. 59 Sortedam Dossering, Copenhagen
- Kristi gravlæggelse (1890)
- Syge anråber Jesus om hjælp (1891) Garnisons Sogns Menighedshus, Copenhagen
- Jesus opvækker Lazarus (1897) Nørre Broby Church
- Jesus prædiker i Nazareth (1904) formerly Nazareth Church, Copenhagen
- Lazarus opvækkelse (1918) Grøndalskirke, Copenhagen

== Gallery ==
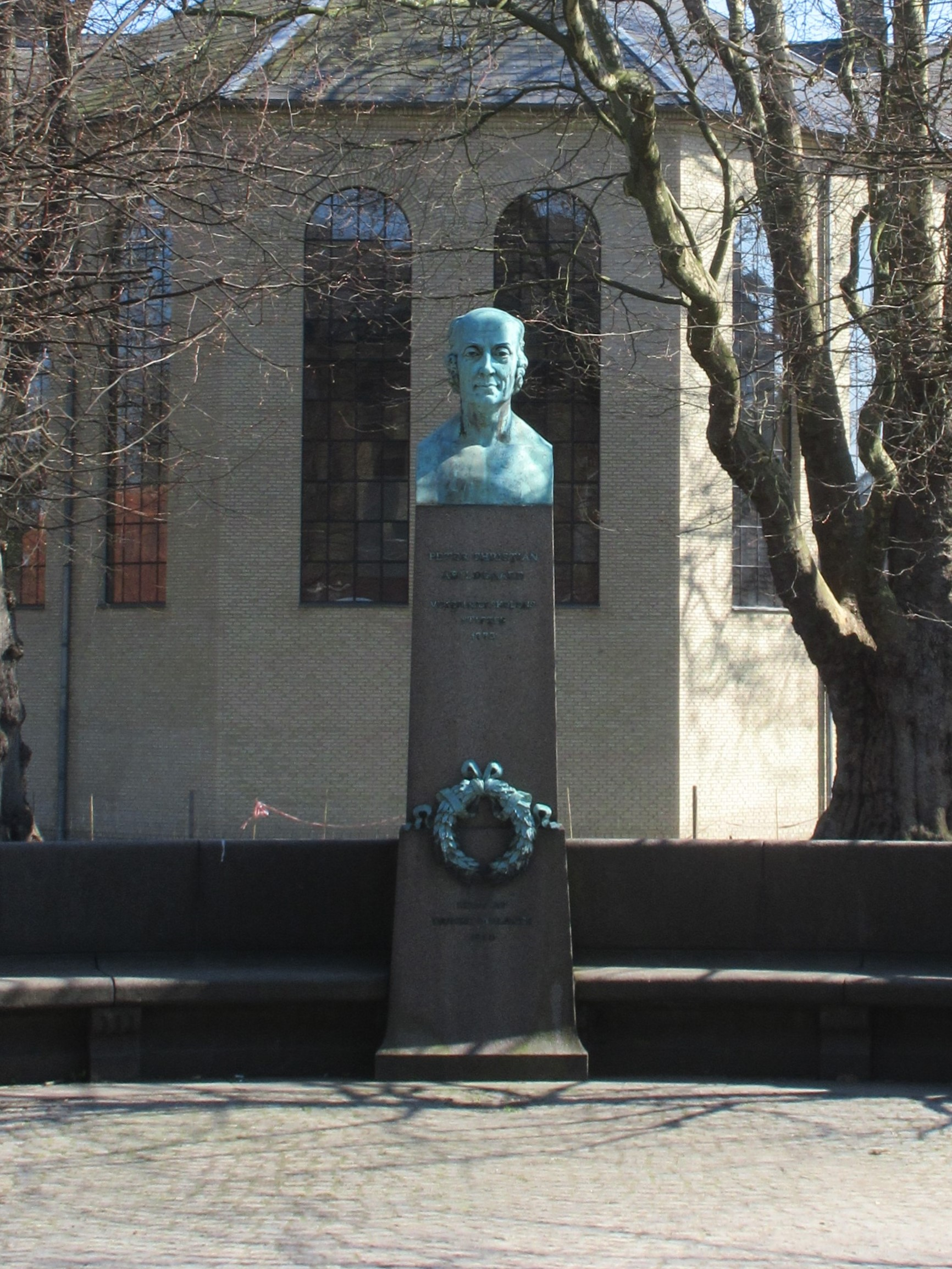
Peter Christian Abildgaard, Frederiksberg (1910)

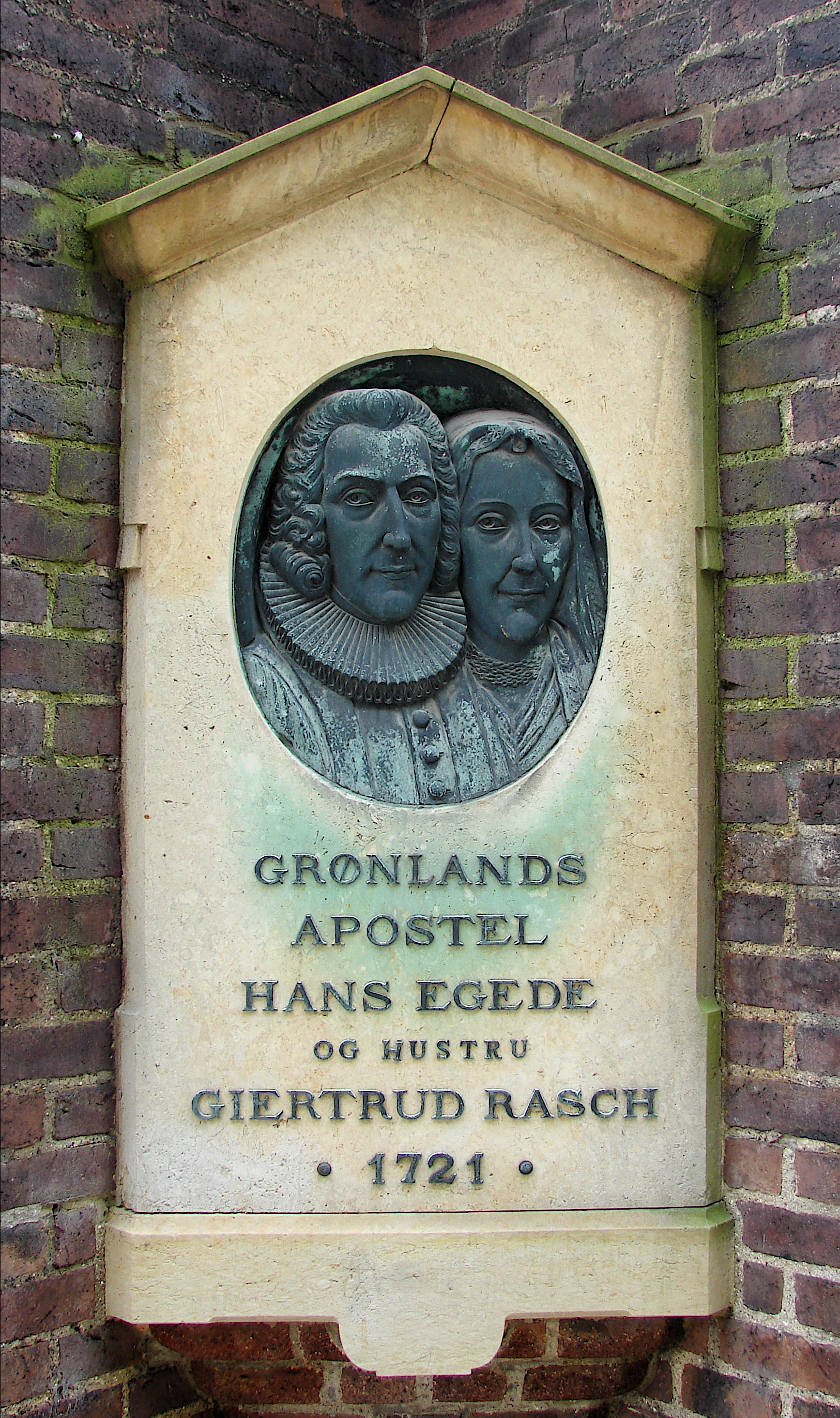
Hans Egede, St. Nicolas' Church, Copenhagen (1921)

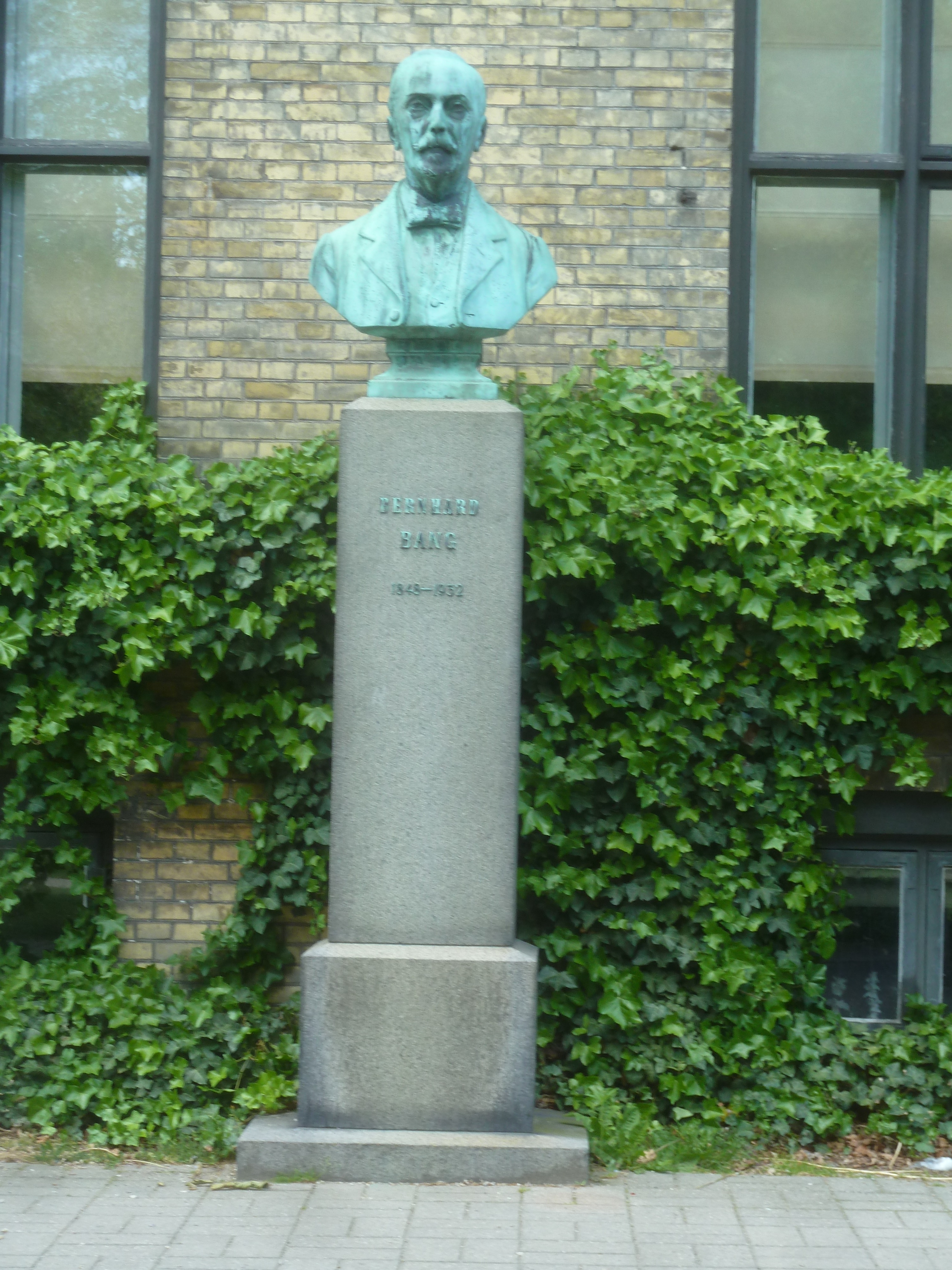
Bernhard Bang, Frederiksberg (1923)

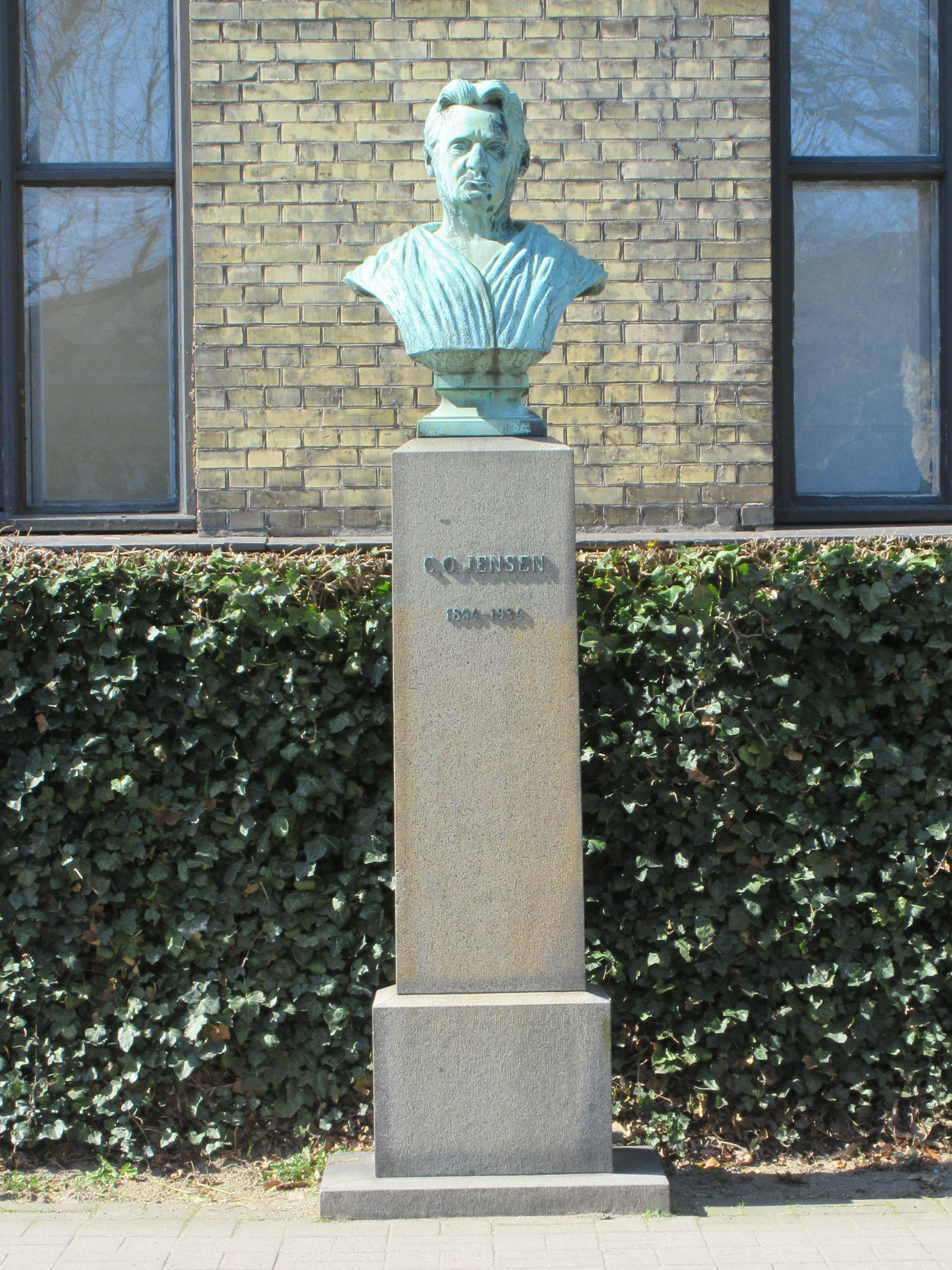
Carl Oluf Jensen, Frederiksberg (1935)
