= Appeals Selection Committee of the Supreme Court of Norway =

Committee of the Supreme Court of Norway

The Appeals Selection Committee of the Supreme Court (in Norwegian Høyesteretts ankeutvalg) was originally a court of Norway in its own right. However, it no longer constitutes a separate instance – a case will be decided upon either by the Appeals Selection Committee or by the Supreme Court. The Appeals Selection Committee intermittently comprises three Supreme Court Justices appointed by the Chief Justice of the Supreme Court of Norway.

In penal cases which have been appealed from the Lagmannsrett (Court of Appeals) and in civil action cases where the appeal pertained to a substance valued at less than NOK 100,000, a leave from the Appeals Selection Committee is required for the case to be tried before the Supreme Court. Besides, the Appeals Selection Committee is authorized to reject appeals if, among other things, the possibility of a successful appeal is obviously non-existent.

Besides, the Appeals Selection Committee is the final authority on appeals.

The rulings of the Appeals Selection Committee are published in Norsk Retstidende (Norwegian Law Reports).

Pursuant to the implementation on January 1, 2008, of the Lov om mekling og rettergang i sivile tvister (tvisteloven), the Appeals Selection Committee of the Supreme Court changed its Norwegian name from Høyesteretts kjæremålsutvalg to Høyesteretts ankeutvalg, on account of the sole use of the term anke (appeal) instead of the antiquated synonymous term kjæremål.

== Sources ==
- Jon Gisle, et al.: Jusleksikon, Kunnskapsforlaget, Oslo (2003). ISBN 82-573-1338-6
