= Per Brunsvig =

Norwegian barrister

- Born: 1917; Skien, Norway
- Died: 1997 (aged 79–80)
- Occupation: Barrister

Per Brunsvig (1917–1997) was a Norwegian barrister.

He was born in Skien. He was a lawyer, then from 1955 barrister with access to working with Supreme Court cases. In 1973 he took the dr.juris degree with the thesis Konstruksjonsansvar ved bygging av skip, and later chaired the Norwegian Bar Association from 1976 to 1979.
