= Hans Stenberg-Nilsen =

Norwegian lawyer (1930–2025)

- Born: 19 December 1930; Oslo, Norway
- Died: 14 January 2025 (aged 94)
- Education: University of Oslo
- Occupation: Attorney

Hans Stenberg-Nilsen (19 December 1930 – 14 January 2025) was a Norwegian jurist and Supreme Court attorney.

== Life and career ==
Stenberg-Nilsen was born in Oslo on 19 December 1930. He graduated as cand.jur. from the University of Oslo in 1954, and was assigned as public attorney at the Supreme Court of Norway from 1972. He edited the journal Norsk Retstidende from 1984 to 2000, and chaired the Norwegian Bar Association from 1985 to 1988.

He was decorated Knight, first Class of the Order of St. Olav in 2008.

Stenberg-Nilsen died on 14 January 2025, at the age of 94.
