= Andreas Hallager =

Danish musician (1796–1853)

- Born: Andreas Sørensen Hallager; 28 August 1796; Hørsholm, Denmark
- Died: 9 December 1853 (aged 57) Near Nørreport, Denmark
- Occupations: musician, composer, music director
- Instrument: oboe
- Years active: 1803–1848

Andreas Hallager (28 August 1796 – 9 December 1853) was a Danish musician, orchestra leader, and composer. Most of Hallager's career as a musician was spent in the service of the Danish Military. He was awarded the Swedish Medal of Merit, the Order of the Dannebrog, and the Dannebrogordenens Hæderstegn.

== Career ==
Hallager began receiving music lessons at the age of 7. In 1810, he became an oboist in the military as part of the borgerlige infanteri. In 1815, he traveled to Stockholm where he served for 8 months in the Kongelige Gardes Musikkorps, before returning to Copenhagen. He served as an oboist in the Danish military again as part of the Livjægerkorps.

From 1821–1822 he resided in Saint Petersburg, where he was offered a job at the opera, though he declined it. He was hired to arrange the music for Prince Christian Frederik's Regiment in 1825. He also took over responsibility for Prince Frederick's table music in 1836. In 1842, he became the music director of the Second Infantry Brigade's newly established music corps in Stockholm.

On 4 July 1842, he was awarded the Order of the Dannebrog, followed by the Dannebrogordenens Hæderstegn in 1848. He also received the gold Swedish Medal of Merit in January 1849.

== Music ==
Three booklets of Hallager's compositions were published within his lifetime. All three were published by the printer Jørgen Ditlev Qvist between 1835 and 1837. These compositions received poor reviews at the time, which stated that his music had a "poverty of spirit" and demonstrated a "lack of knowledge of theory". They included:

- Musikalsk Nytaarsgave: Romancer med Accompagnement for Pianoforte eller Guitar. (1835)
- Otte Romancer. Musikalsk Nytaarsgave med Accompagnement for Pianoforte eller Guitar. (1836)
- Apolloharpen. Musikalsk Jule- og Nytaarsgave for Sang og Pianoforte. (1837)

Hallager also produced a few arrangements for guitar, namely the Spanish dance El Jaleo de Xeres and Cachucha from August Bournonville's Ballet Toreadore.

== Personal life ==
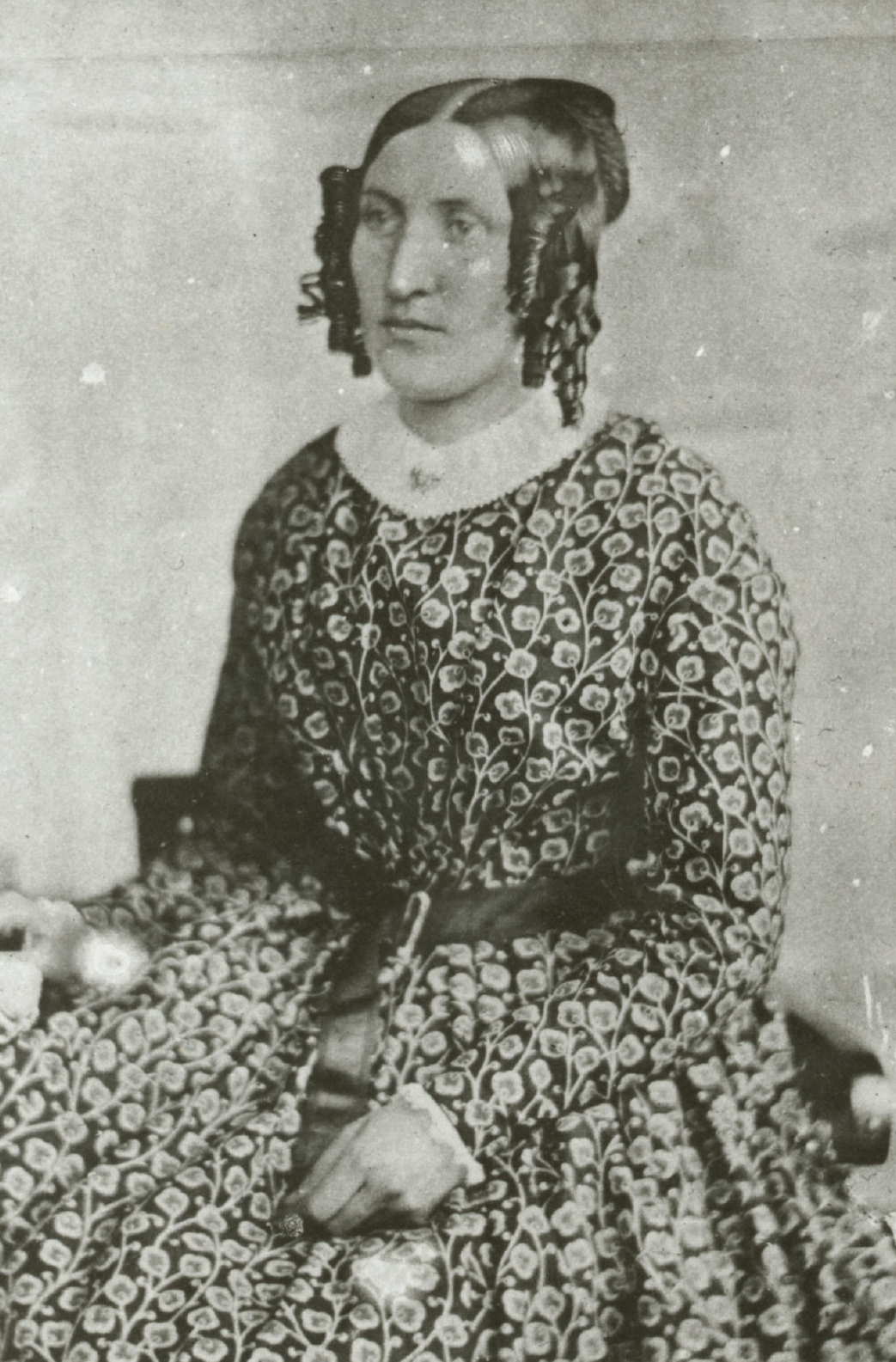
Andreas' daughter, Thora Hallager, in 1866

Andreas Sørensen Hallager was born on 28 August 1796 in Hørsholm. His father, Søren Hallager, was a shoemaker. Andreas Hallager had three biological children: Jens Giulliani Hallager (1820–1828), Thora Charoline Andrea Hallager (1821–1884), and Samuel Jacob Nicolaj Hallager (1822–1896).

On 9 February 1816, he married Karen Hohanne Nicoline Liebert. The couple had a son, Samuel who later became a sculptor, in 1822. They divorced on 4 December 1827.

In 1828, he moved in with Anne Margrethe Degen with whom he had previously had a daughter, Thora Hallager, in 1821. Hallager then became the stepfather to Anne's son Søffren Degen, who later became a well-known Danish guitarist. As Hallager was very interested in guitar music, it is likely that he taught Søffren to play. His biological son, Jens Giulliani Hallager, was named after the guitar virtuoso and composer Mauro Giuliani.

On 18 October 1850, he married Juliette Wilhelmine Charlotte Schwensen (1820–1896). He died on 10 December 1853 in Copenhagen.

== See also ==
- List of Danish composers
