= Clara Raphael's House =

Building in Copenhagen, Denmark

- Clara Raphaels Hus
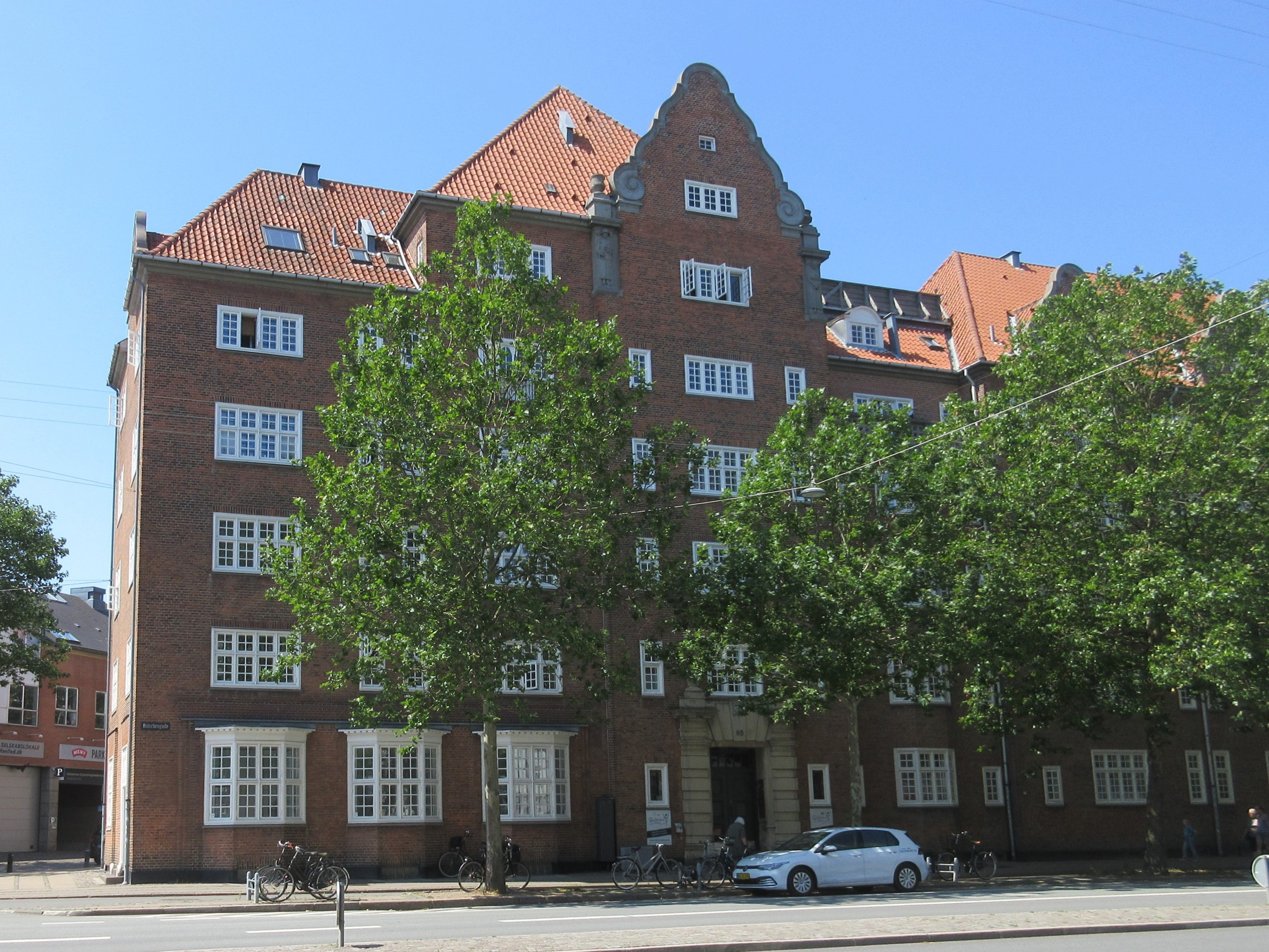
- Interactive map of the Clara Raphael's House area

General information
- Location: Østerbrogade 85, Copenhagen, Denmark
- Coordinates: 55°42′24.2″N 12°34′37.5″E
- Construction started: 1918
- Completed: 1929
- Client: Women's Dwellings Association

Design and construction
- Architect: Johannes Strøm Tejsen

Clara Raphael's House (Danish: Clara Raphaels Hus), situated at Østerbrogade No. 85, Østerbro, was constructed in 1918–20 to provide affordable dwellings for single, self-supporting women in Copenhagen, Denmark. The building is named for the eponymous protagonist of Mathilde Fibiger's debut novel.

== History ==
The idea for the building was conceived by the translator Thora Daugaard, Having had to move 12 times during her studies, she had first-hand experience with just how difficult it was for single, self-supporting women to finde suitable accommodation. During a stay in London, she had stayed in a similar building. Emma Gad had already started campaigning for what would later result in Women's Building on Niels Hemmingsens Gade in conjunction with the 1895 Copenhagen Women's Exhibition. Some dwellings for women were part of her original plans for the building but it was not realized until 1936. The Women Readers Association had managed to raise money for the construction of a four-storey building, completed in 1910 to designs by Ulrik Plesner and Aage Langeland-Mathiesen, on the corner of Gammel Mønt and Antonigade, in the city centre. This building contained hotel rooms reserved for women as well as a restaurant, but no dwellings. Many other buildings with dwellings reserved for women catered to women with "old-world needs", such as widows and unmarried daughters, or other women in difficult circumstances, rather than modern, emancipated women. Examples of the latter institutions included Det Harboeske Enkefruekloster on Stormgade, Trøstens Bolig on Skindergade and Abel Cathrines Stiftelse in Vesterbro.

After returning to Copenhagen, Daugaard founded the Women's Dwellings Association (Kvindernes Byggeforening) in collaboration with Thora Davidsen and Julie Laurberg. Frederik Christian Boldsen, a lawyer with close ties to the property industry, was also involved in realizing the building. The city contributed to the realization of the project by providing a plot on favourable conditions. The architect Johannes Strøm Tejsen, who had worked for city architect Ludvig Fenger, was charged with designing the building. It was constructed in 1918–1920.

The new building was named for the epinymous protagonist of Mathilde Fibiger's 1851 debut novel. It contained 150 small dwellings for single, self-supporting women. The dwellings facing the street had private bathrooms and were the most expensive. The ones facing the yard, with shared bathrooms, were cheaper. A restaurant was located on the ground floor. A house telephone in the individual dwellings made it possible for the residents to inquire abouth the day's menu and order a meal sent up to the room. The meal was then sent up to the relevant floor via a food lift. The restaurant closed in 1978.

Julie Laurberg operated a photographic studio in partnership with Franziska Gad. The studio was later continued by Hedevig Helms as Julie Laurberg & Gads Eftf. (Julie Laurberg & Gad's Successor). This photographic studio was located in the building in 1950.

== Architecture ==
Clara Raphael's House is a five-story National Romantic building located at the acute-angled northern corner of Østerbrogade and Marskensgade. The gable motifs are similar to the ones seen in many of Ulrik Plesner's slightly older residential buildings.

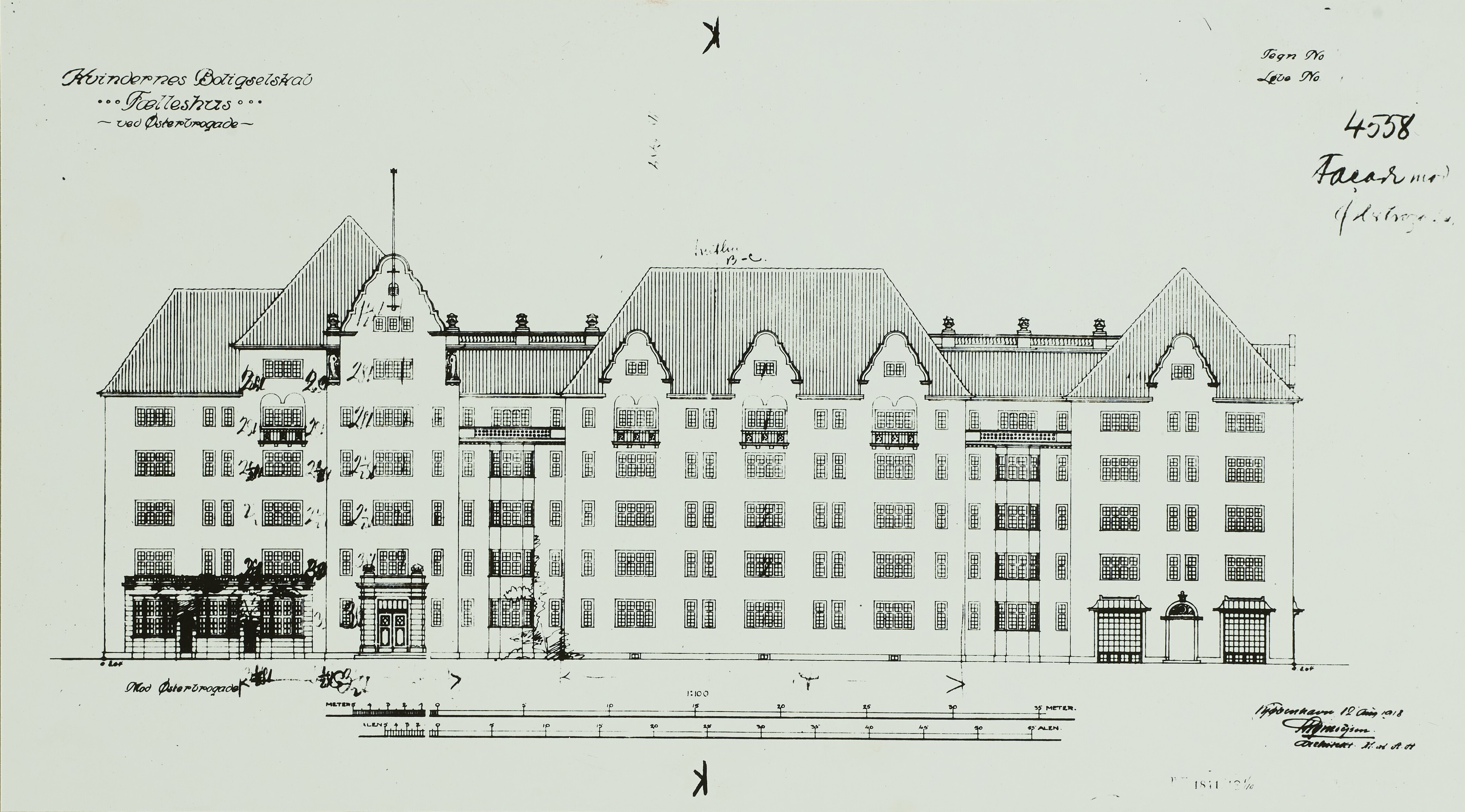

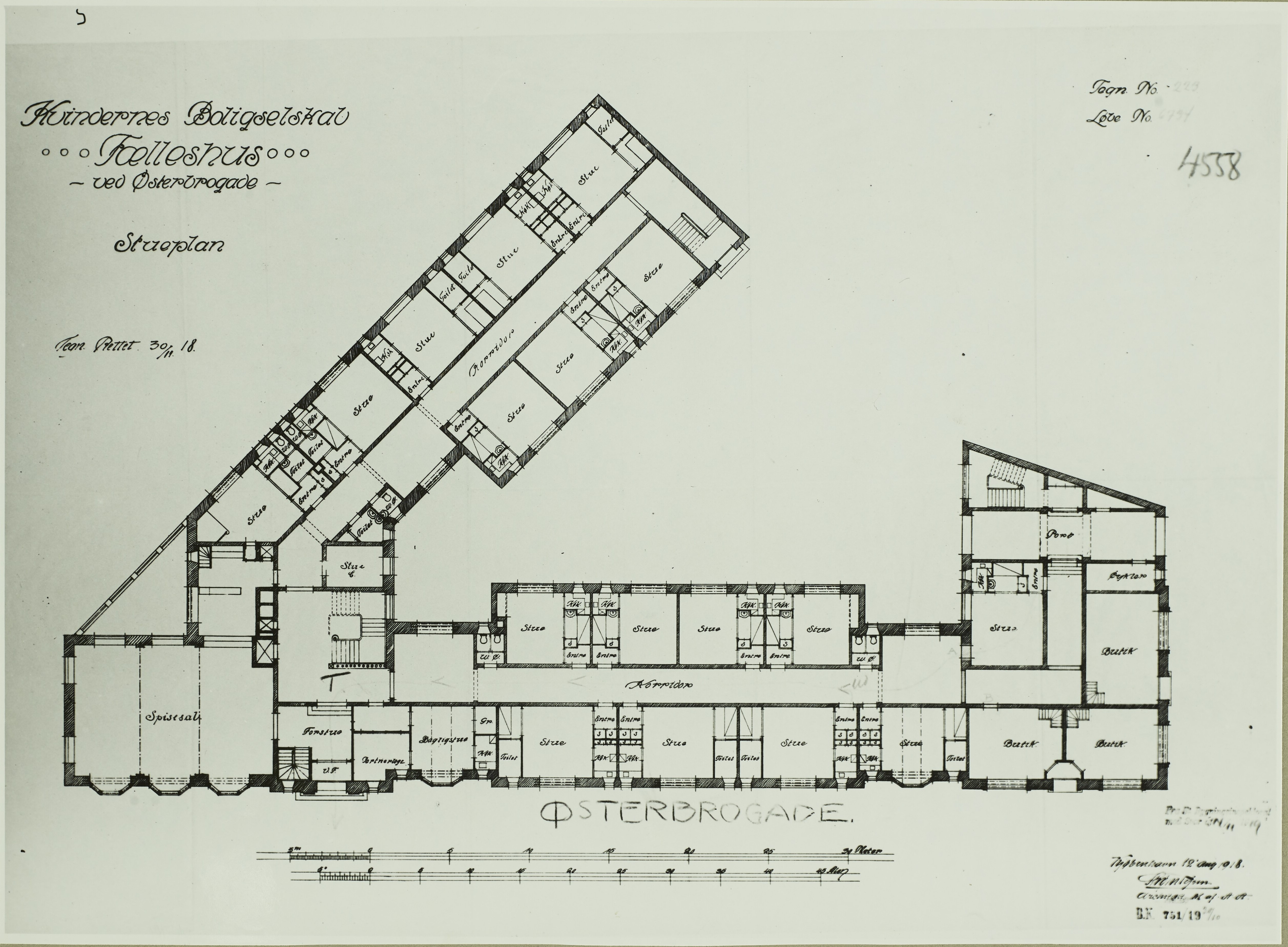
