= N.P. Wieth-Knudsen Observatory =

Observatory in Tisvilde, Denmark

Coordinates: 56.0507°N 12.0975°E

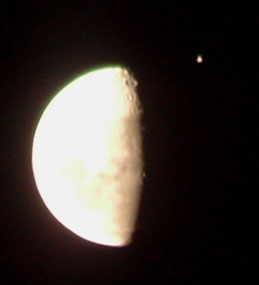
Jupiter being occulted by the Moon, 16 June 2005, in Nelson, New Zealand

N.P. Wieth-Knudsen Observatory is next to Tisvilde Hegn, two hours away from Copenhagen, Denmark, at Margot Nyholms vej 19, 3220 Tisvildeleje, on the outskirts of a small residential area in Tisvilde, away from artificial light generated by larger cities. It was constructed in 1959 by Dr. Niels Palle Wieth-Knudsen (1909–1993), who used the observatory until his death. His biggest contribution to astronomy was the observation of lunar occultations, during which the moon passes in front of stars, the data from which is then used in the accurate determination of the lunar position. This became important during the 1969 Apollo Moon landings.

In 1999, Wieth-Knudsen's widow, Inger Wieth-Knudsen (1914–2004), presented the building as a gift to the Danish Astronomical Society. The observatory holds a 16-inch computer-controlled telescope. On the observatory grounds there are two radio telescopes and a series of platforms for smaller telescopes, including a solar telescope. The public is welcome to free star-gazing events held on the second and the last Saturdays of every month. Members of the Danish Astronomical Society use the observatory for their own observations on other nights.

== See also ==
- List of astronomical observatories
