= Thora Hallager =

Danish photographer (1821–1884)

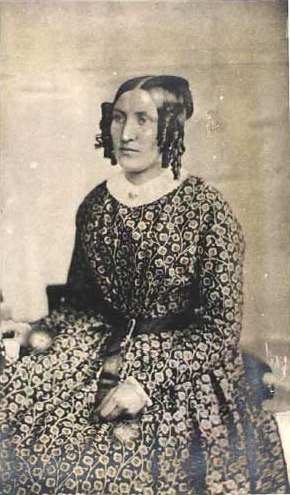
Thora Hallager, self-portrait (1866)

Thora Hallager (1821–1884) was a Danish photographer. She was Denmark's earliest female photographer.

She was the daughter of the official Andreas Hallager and Anne Margrethe Degen. Her parents were not married but lived together until 1846.

She appears to have been familiar with daguerreotypy before she went on a study trip to Paris in 1855, apparently to learn about the latest American developments in the process. She probably practised as a photographer in Copenhagen from about 1850 before opening her own studio in 1857.

Hallager was Hans Christian Andersen's landlady in Lille Kongensgade, Copenhagen, from 1866 to 1869 and in Nyhavn from 1871 to 1873. Andersen wrote to her frequently during his travels from 1867 to 1873, explaining for the most part where he had been and when he expected to return but on one occasion (letter of 21 June 1869) he tells her how pleased he was with a photograph she had taken of him, informing her it had also been appreciated by all those who had seen it.

== Selected photographs ==
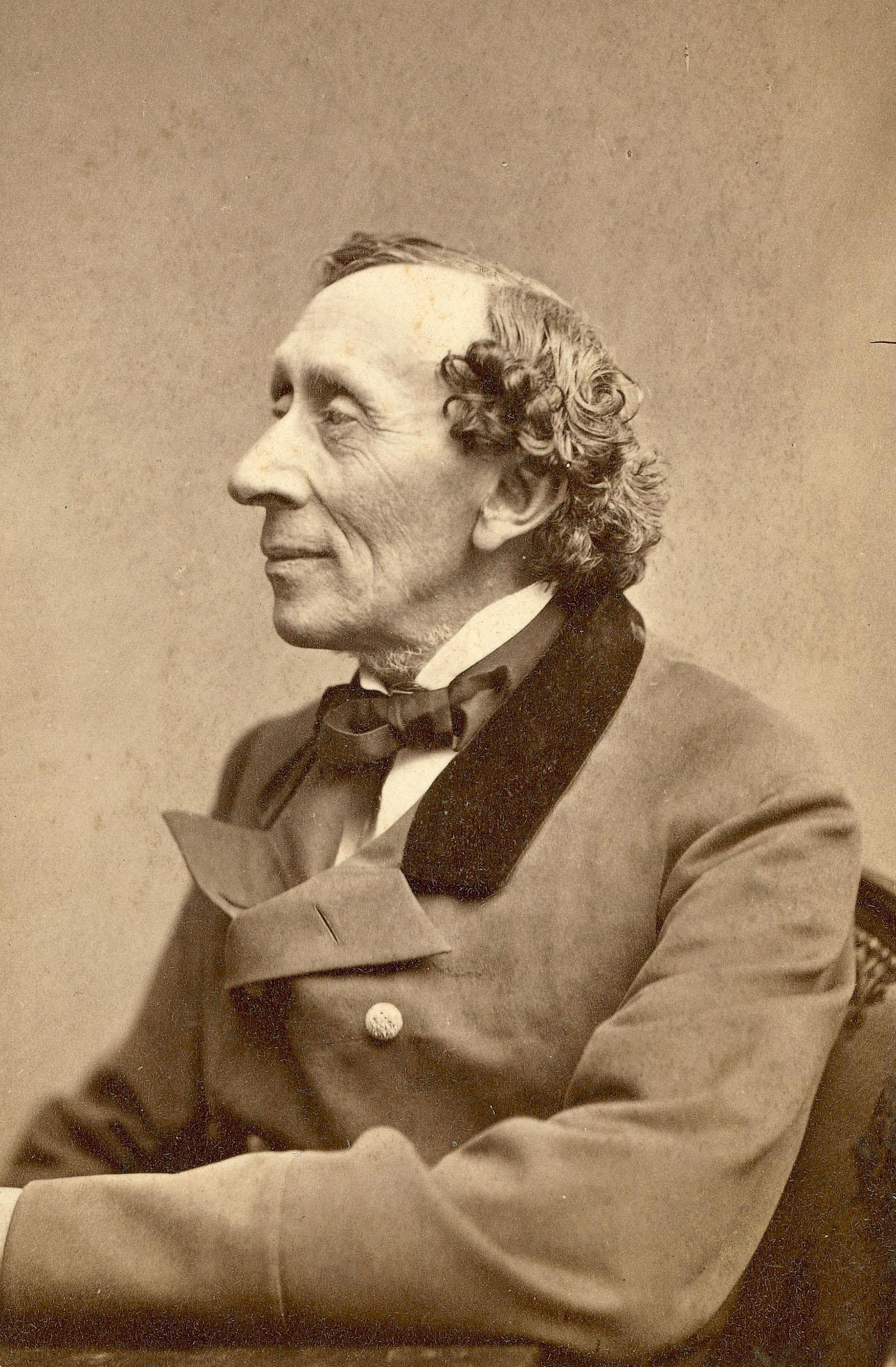
Hans Christian Andersen (October 1869)

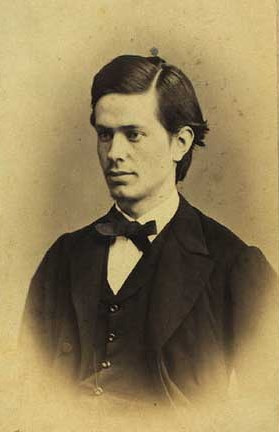
Carl Wagner, army officer

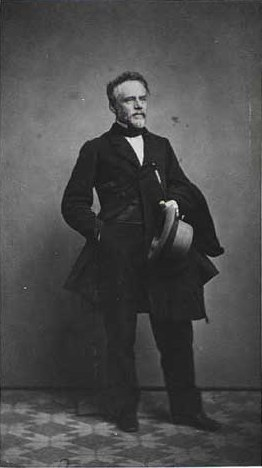
Wilhelm Marstrand, painter

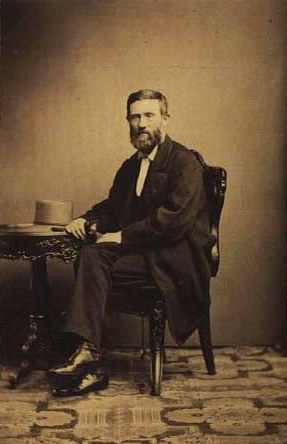
P.C. Skovgaard, painter

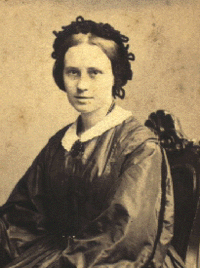
Novelist Mathilde Fibiger
