= Danish Astronomical Society =

The Danish Astronomical Society (Dansk Astronomisk Selskab) was founded in 1916 'with the purpose of acting for the spread of knowledge and interest in astronomy and astronomical research'. According to its own description, its address varies. The Society is open to anyone with a desire to learn more about astronomy, and gives members access to talks and lectures by astronomers and astrophysicists, and allows them to use equipment at the N.P. Wieth-Knudsen Observatory in Tisvilde to observe astronomical phenomena. It also disseminates news on upcoming conferences, lectures and events, as well as general information on upcoming astronomical events such as eclipses and comets, and lists of observatories and other facilities. The current president of Danish Astronomical Society is Majken B. E. Christensen.

== See also ==
- List of astronomical societies
