= The Women's Building (Copenhagen) =

Building in Copenhagen, Denmark

- Kvindernes Bygning
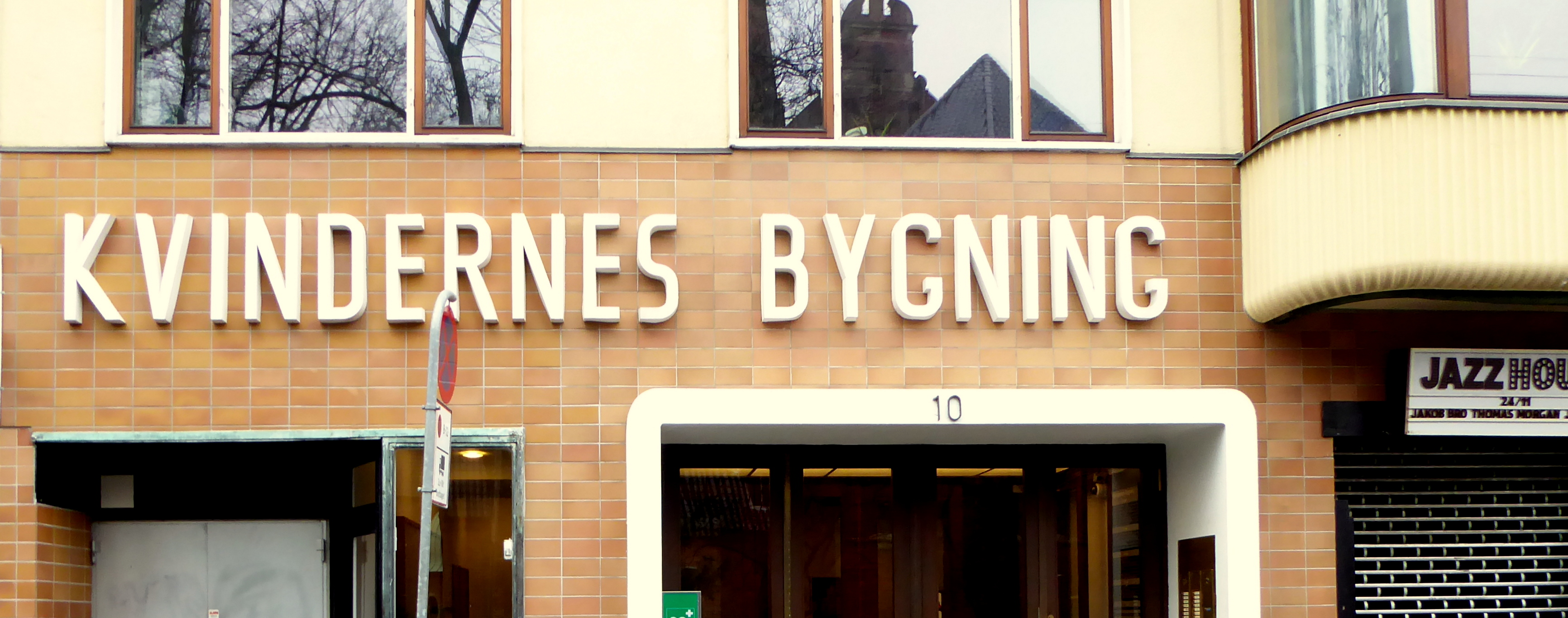
- Interactive map of the The Women's Building area

General information
- Location: Niels Hemmingsens Gade, Copenhagen, Denmark
- Coordinates: 55°40′45.41″N 12°34′40.08″E
- Completed: 1936
- Client: Women's Dwellings Association

Design and construction
- Architect: Ragna Grubb

The Women's Building (Danish: Kvindernes Bygning) is a self-owning institution situated at Niels Hemmingsens Gade 8–10 in Copenhagen, Denmark. The early Functionalist building was completed in 1936 to designs by Ragna Grubb. The music venue Copenhagen Jazzhouse was located in the building from 1991 to 2017. Its former premises is now operated as a new music venue, Hotel Cecil, affiliated with Bremen Teater.

== History ==
The 1895 Copenhagen Women's Exhibition was a great success. Not only was it appreciated in Denmark and beyond, it made a substantial profit of DKK 13,000. Emma Gad presented the idea of using the money as start captal for an arganisation tasked with constructing a Women's Building in Copenhagen. The building was supposed to contain an assembly hall, reading room, restaurant, accommodation for women from the provinces, dwellings for single-self-supporting women and a medical clinic with female doctors. The idea was well received and a committee was set up with many of the same members who had played a key role in making the 1895 exhibition happen. The first meeting was held in September 1896.

Sophie Elberti represented Women Readers Association in the committee. When progress proved slow, she responded by arranging for the construction of the Women Readers Association's new building at the corner of Gammel Mønt and Antoniegade, with considerable criticism from the other committee members. The four-storey building was completed in 1910. Another organization, The Women's Dwellings Association (Kvindernes Boligforening), established at the initiative of Thora Daugaard, among others, constructed Clara Raphael's House on Østerbrogade in 1918–1920. Their building contained 150 dwellings for single, self-supporting women.

The work with realizing the Women's Building continued in spite of the other buildings, although the plans for what it was supposed to contain changed over time. A wide range of events and other initiatives were employed to raise money for the project. These included a lottery, a flower exhibition, a sport event for women, concerts and the sale of porcelain plates. The project was delayed by World War I. By 192, DKK 75,000 had been raised. Five very small properties on Niels Hemmingsens Gade werte acquired and the existing buildings were demolished. An architectural competition launched in 1934 was won by Ragna Grubb. The building topped out in January 1936. It was taken into use in 1937.

The new building contained four shops on the ground floor, meeting room and restaurant on the first floor, offices for women's associations on the third floor and Hotel Cecil on the fourth and fifth floor. The basement contained two large assembly halls.

The Ny Carlsberg Foundation presented a couple of paintings by Christine Swane to the building in 1937.<ref">"Christine Swane". Dansk Kvindebiografisk Leksikon (in Danish).</ref>

When the Royal Danish Theatre's old building on Kongens Nytorv, it rented the basement of the Women's Building, as Gråbrødrescenen, named for nearby Gråbrødretorv, as a temporary home for part of its activities. The hotel and restaurant were also closed. The premises were subsequently let out to external tenants. When the Royal Theatre returned to its building on Kongens Nytorv, its former premises in the Women's Building were converted into the music venue Copenhagen Jazzhouse.

== Logo ==
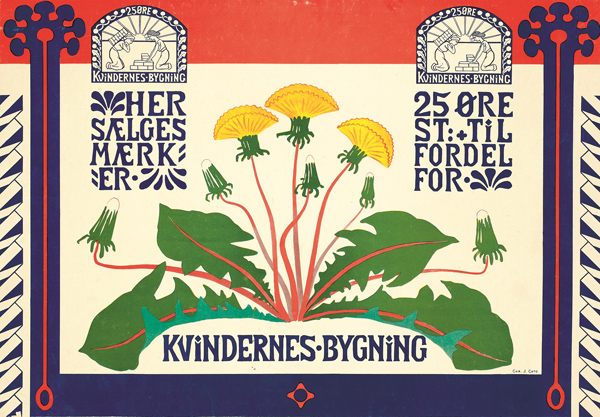
Poster supporting the construction of the Women's Building.

Suzette Skovgaard-Holten, who had also served as artistic director of the Copenhagen Women's Exhibition, was tasked with creqating a logo for the project. It features a Dandelion as the central motif. The flower is still used as the logo of the building. In 2011, it was redesigned by the artist Karin Birgitte Lund.

== Today ==
Copenhagen Jazzhouse's former premises is now home to a new music venue, Hotel Cecil, named for the hotel which was once located on the two upper floors. The music venue is operated by the owners of Bremen Teater.

== Presidents ==
- (1928–1942) Karna Nilsson
- (1942–1961) Elna Rasmussen
- (1961–1970) Karen Schack
- (1970–1972) Karen Sabroe
- (1972–1982) Dagmar Henriksen
- (1982–1984) Anne-Marie Bruun
- (1984–2013) Tove Koed
- (2013-oresent) Annemarie Balle
