= Mathilde Fibiger =

Danish feminist, novelist, and telegraphist

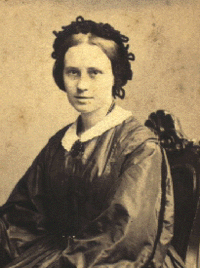
- Mathilde Fibiger, photographed by Thora Hallager
- Born: 13 December 1830; Copenhagen, Denmark
- Died: 17 June 1872 (aged 41); Aarhus, Denmark
- Occupations: Writer, suffragist

Mathilde Fibiger (13 December 1830 – 17 June 1872) was a Danish feminist, novelist, and telegraphist.

== Biography ==
Mathilde Fibiger was born in Copenhagen in 1830. Her father, Captain Johan Adolph Fibiger, was an army officer; her mother was Margrethe Cecilia Nielsen Aasen. Her elder sister was Ilia Fibiger.

== Literary work ==
Mathilde Fibiger was a novelist who championed women's rights in her first novel, "Clara Raphael, Tolv Breve" (Clara Raphael, Twelve Letters), published in 1851. It is a partial autobiographical story of a young woman, Clara Raphael, who works as a governess in the provinces; it is based in part on Fibiger's experiences as a private tutor on the island of Lolland in 1849. The novel consists largely of letters written by Clara to her friend, Mathilde; Clara's ideas about women living an independent life run counter to the beliefs of the local population, and she resolves to make women's emancipation her life objective. The book created a great deal of controversy on its publication in 1851; while the Danish literary establishment was divided between those who supported her and those who felt that her ideas were too radical, all agreed on the literary merit of her work.

== Support of women's rights ==
Fibiger was the first public figure in Denmark to forward the women's rights issue. She wrote novels, articles and discussion papers since age 20 in 1851.

In counter opinions in society against women's rights, Fibiger published two pamphlets; Hvad er Emancipation? (What is Emancipation?) and Et Besøg (A Visit). Her later novels included En Skizze efter det virkelige Liv (A Sketch from Real Life, 1853) and Minona. En Fortaelling (Minona: A Tale, 1854). En Skizze efter det virkelige Liv is the story of two sisters who were orphaned at an early age, and the men with whom they develop relationships; the older sister rejects her suitor, feeling that men are weak, while the younger sister falls in love. Minona created new controversy with its complex plot involving unwed mothers and incest; Minona, the chief character, overcomes her incestuous attraction after converting to Christianity.

== Work as telegraphist ==
While Fibiger's novels generated critical acclaim, they were not commercially successful, and she began to look for other means to support herself. She supplemented a meager allowance, received from the state, by dressmaking and translating German literary works. In 1863, she began training as a telegraph operator for the Danish State Telegraph service, which had recently decided to hire women as operators under the management of Director Peter Faber. In 1866, she completed her training at the Helsingør telegraph station, and became the first woman to be employed as a telegraph operator in Denmark.

After two years in Helsingør, she was transferred to Nysted in 1869 to manage a newly opened station. Not surprisingly, she encountered resistance from male operators, who saw the employment of women as operators as a threat to their livelihood. In spite of her managerial position, her pay at Nysted was scarcely sufficient to enable her to pay her expenses. The following year, she applied for a transfer to the telegraph station in Aarhus.

She continued to experience difficulties in Aarhus, where the station manager had opposed her assignment. The problems she experienced in her telegraphic work began to affect her health; she died in Aarhus in 1872 at the age of 41. She is remembered today in Denmark not only as a pioneering feminist who wrote in support of women's rights, but also as the woman who opened the door for the employment of women in the Danish State Telegraph service.

== Prizes and honors ==
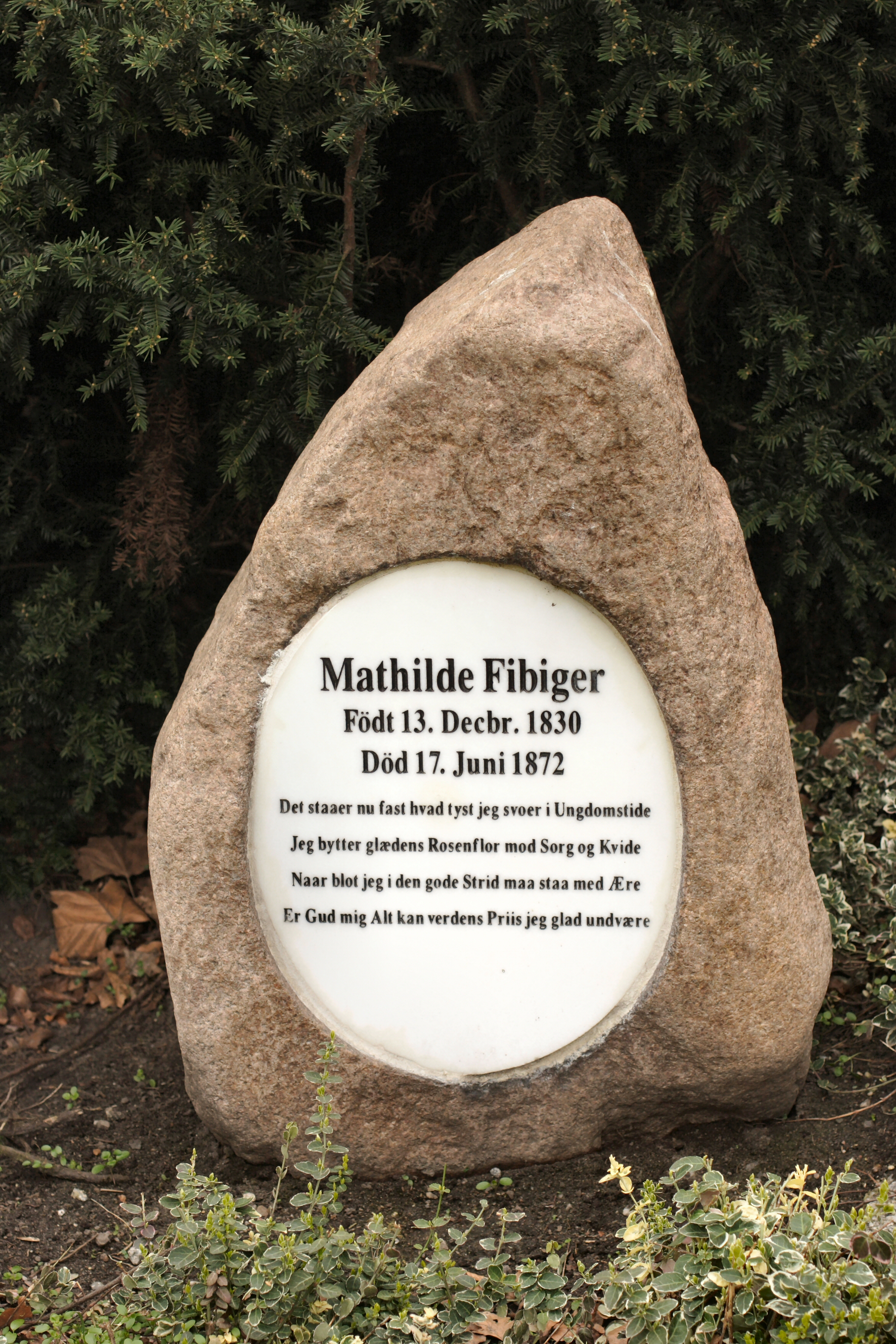
Gravestone in Aarhus City Hall Park..

Such was her prominence as an advocate for gender equality, in order to honour it, the Dansk Kvindesamfund (Danish Women's Society) created Mathildeprisen (The Mathilde Prize). The Mathilde Prize was established in 1970 and is awarded to both men and women in recognition of work that advances gender equality. Recipients of the prize includes Suzanne Brøgger, Joan-søstrene, Kenneth Reinicke, Anja Andersen and Anja C. Andersen.

The street "Mathilde Fibigers Vej" in Frederiksberg, Copenhagen is named after her. A small garden square adjacent to the Women's Museum in central Aarhus is also named "Mathilde Fibigers Have" in her honor.

The Eomen's Dwellings Association's (Kvindernes Boligforening) building at Østerbrogade 85 in Copenhagen is named Clara Raphael's House after the eponymous protagonist of her debut novel.

== Sources ==
- "The Fibiger family history" (in Danish). Fibiger.NET. Archived from the original on 2017-07-03.
