= Karl Jensen =

Karl Jensen is the name of

- Karl Jensen (painter) (1851–1933), Danish painter
- Karl Jensen (athlete) (1898–1928), Danish discus and hammer thrower
- Karl Julius Jensen (1888-1965), Danish long-distance runner

See also

- Carl Jensen (disambiguation)
