= Ragna Grubb =

Danish architect (1903–1961)

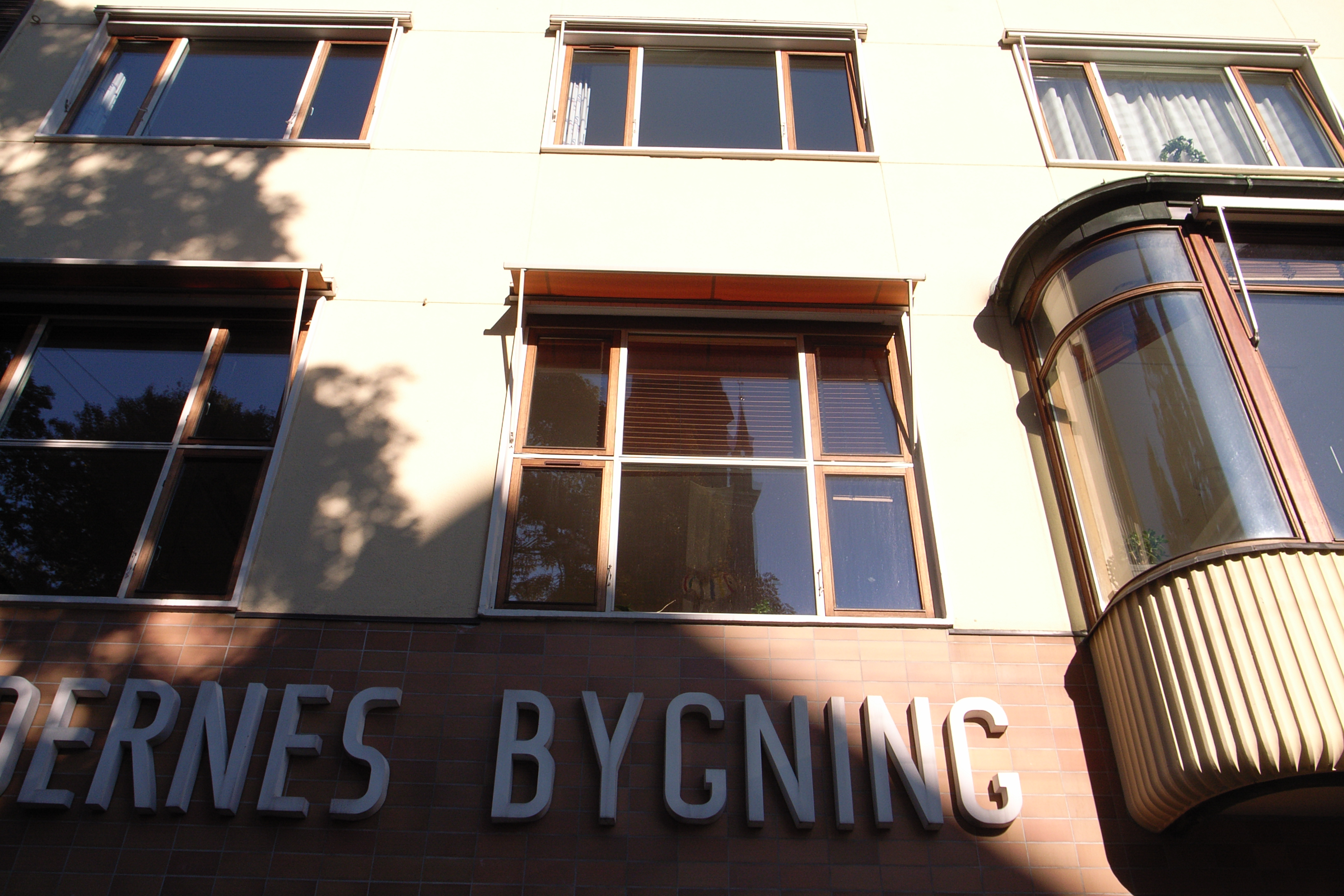
Kvindernes Bygning (1936) designed by Ragna Grubb

Ragna Grubb (20 March 1903, Copenhagen – 9 June 1961, Frederiksberg) was a Danish architect. She is remembered as one of the first Danish women to open her own architecture studio and for her interest in social housing in the 1930s.

== Early life ==
Grubb completed her schooling at Nørre Gymnasium in 1921. As a child she was interested in architecture. After studying old buildings during a long trip to Italy and Switzerland, she realized she wanted to become an architect. In 1922, she attended technical school and the following year was admitted to study architecture at the Danish Academy, graduating in 1933. During her studies, she took on part-time work with Kaj Gottlob, Povl Baumann and Knud Sørensen.

== Career ==
In 1935, Grubb set up her own studio, quite an unusual occurrence for women architects at the time. The initiative was based on her winning a competition in 1934 for The Women's Building in Niels Hemmingsens Gade in Copenhagen. The idea was to bring together women involved in good causes as well as philanthropists in a common location. Completed in 1936, the ferro-concrete building comprised a hotel, offices and meeting rooms. The facade had horizontally set windows and a recessed attic floor. The building was designed with the latest architectural features of the day in the Functionalist style. In 1937, together with Karen Hvistendahl and Ingeborg Schmidt, Grubb won the first prize in the Foreningen Socialt Boligbyyeri (Social Housing Association) competition for designing housing for low-income families. Social housing became Grubb's main interest. She was an active proponent for apartments with two or three small bedrooms and more open planning than traditional two-room apartments which served working-class families with several children. She also developed the apartments' interior decoration and furnishing with light wooden furniture. In 1939–1940, she completed one of the large social apartment buildings of Bispebjerg.

In 1937, Grubb married the architect Christian Laursen who occasionally assisted her although he was usually engaged in other work. As family commitments increasingly weighed on her time, her later work was devoted to a few private homes and summer houses and to restoration.
