= Norsk Retstidende =

Online legal magazine in Norway

Norsk Retstidende (Rt.) was a periodical published by the Norwegian Bar Association. It was in circulation between 1836 and 2015. From 2016 it became an online-only publication.

== History and profile ==
The journal was established in 1836, and had its current name since 1909. Norsk Retstidende published judgements of the Supreme Court of Norway, and rulings of the Appeals Selection Committee. In 1871, it was merged with the Norwegian Lawyers' Association's magazine entitled Ugeblad for Lovkyndighed, Statistik og Statsøkonomi. In 1908, the Norwegian Bar and Lawyers' Association took over the publishing and distribution rights of Norsk Retstidende. Supreme Court lawyer Jens Michael Lund was appointed editor which he held until World War II. Then Supreme Court attorneys Chr. L. Jensen, Trygve Norman and Hans Stenberg-Nilsen and the faculty librarian Pål A. Bertnes served in the post until 2012. Nils Erik Lie was the editor-in-chief of the periodical between 2012 and 2015 when it ceased publication. In 2016 Lovdata acquired Norsk Retstidende and launched it as online-only periodical, while the Norwegian Bar Association retained the right to the historical versions up to and including the 2015 vintage.

Judgements of the Supreme Court are normally referred to as for example Rt. 1954 s. 710, where Rt. stands for Norsk Retstidende, 1954 is the year of the judgement, "s." means page, and 710 is the page number in Norsk Retstidende. In English it would be Rt. 1954 p. 710.

In 1996 the circulation of Norsk Retstidende was 5,000 copies. It was only 350 copies in 2015 just before its closure.
