= Danish Physical Society =

The Danish Physical Society is the national association for physics for Denmark. As such, it is also one of the 41 members of the European Physical Society, and contributes to joint European projects such as the ALICE Collaboration. The Society produces a journal titled Kvant, and also seeks to promote the inclusion of more women in physics through its Network for Women in Physics. This arm of the association also awards the Women in Physics Prize from the Danish Physical Society on an annual basis.
