= Carl Oluf Jensen =

Danish veterinarian and bacteriologist

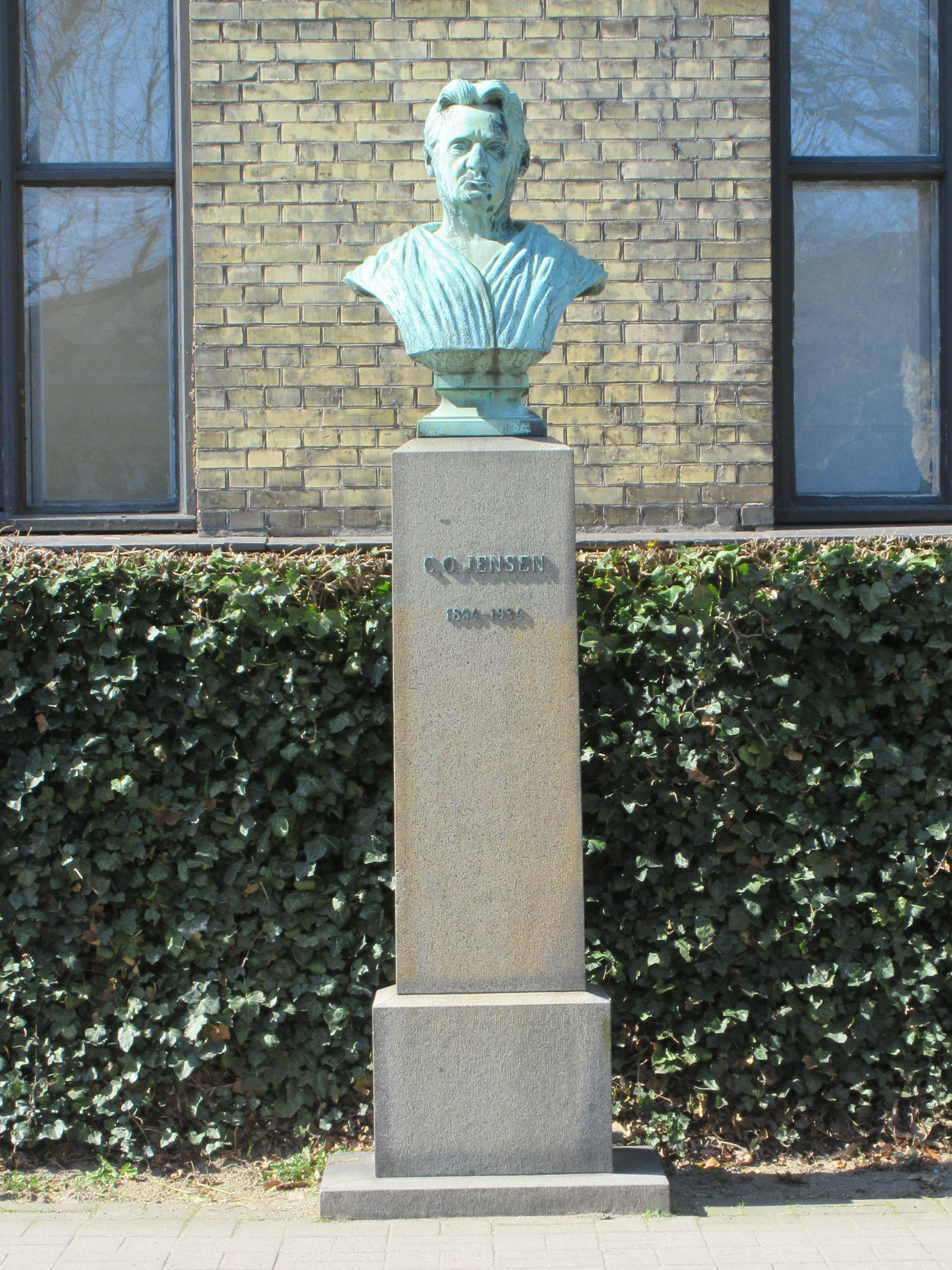
Bust of Jensen

Carl Oluf Jensen (18 March 1864 – 3 September 1934) was a Danish veterinarian who contributed to the study of cancer through animal studies on cancer induction that continue to be used in research cultures and was well known as Jensen sarcoma cells. He also wrote an influential text on dairy bacteriology.

== Life and work ==
Jensen was born to Peter and Dorothea Rasmusdatter and although interested in mathematics and astronomy, trained to become a veterinarian, qualifying at the age of 18 in 1882, he began practice in Copenhagen. He then studied bacteriology under C.J. Salomonsen and Bernhard Bang. In 1887 he worked at the Robert Koch Institute in Berlin and returned to work at the Agricultural Research Laboratory. He became an associate professor at the Royal Danish academy of Sciences in 1889 and taught pathology. He also gave lectures on dairy production, bacteriology, and quality control. In 1901 Jensen made studies on cancer induction by inoculation of cancerous cells into healthy tissue of rats and mice. He also examined tumour induction in turnips. He also worked on serology and serotherapy for animals and was among the first to pioneer X-ray techniques for abdominal surgery in animals. From 1922 he was posted to head the Danish Ministry of Agriculture and was restricted to administrative activities.

Jensen married Maria Magdalene Schmit in 1890. He was a member of the Royal Danish Society of Sciences from 1903. He received the Walker Prize of 1906 for his work on cancer. He died suddenly from an apoplexy while on vacation in Middelfart.
