= Tisvilde =

- Town
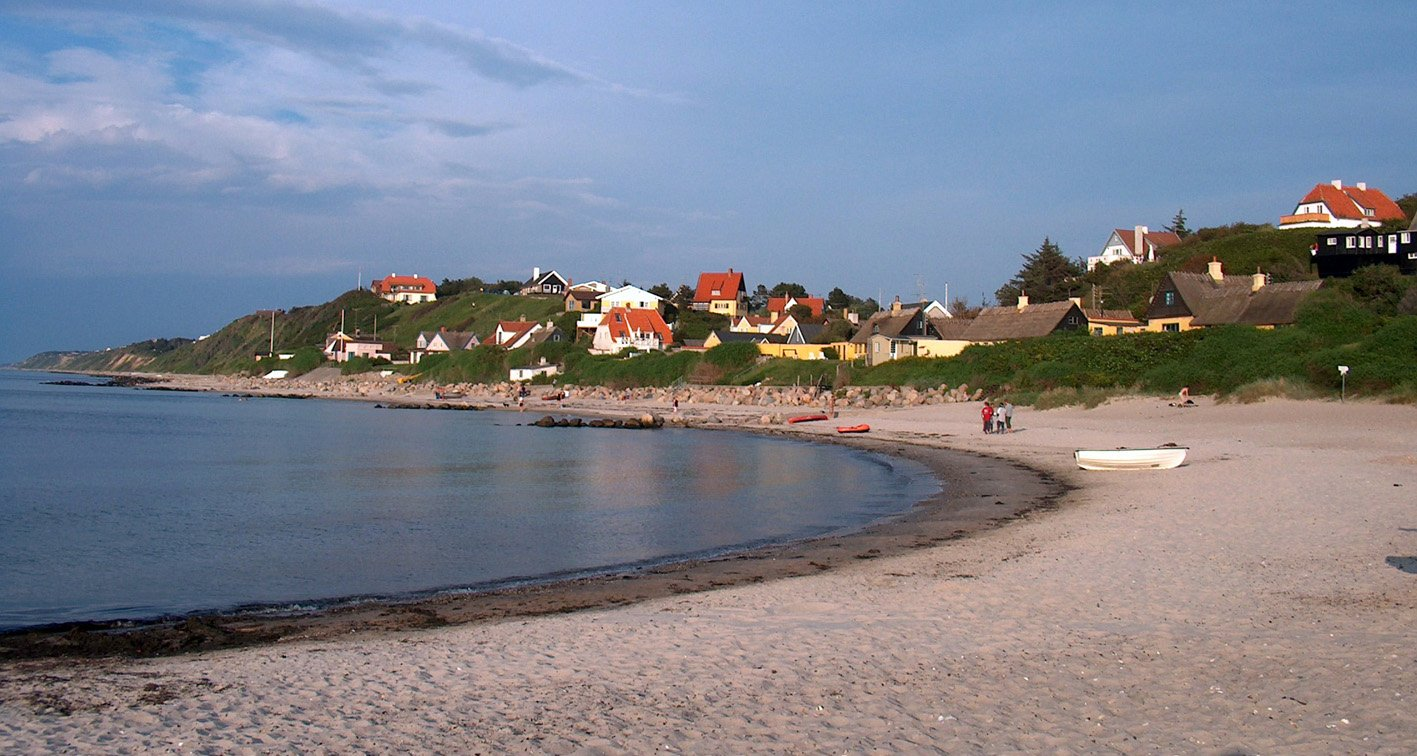
- Tisvildeleje

- Location in Denmark Tisvilde (Capital Region)
- Coordinates: 56°3′28″N 12°5′42″E
- Country: Denmark
- Region: Capital Region
- Municipality: Gribskov Municipality

Area
  - Urban: 3.49 km^{2} (1.35 sq mi)

Population (2026)
  - Urban: 1,341
  - Urban density: 384/km^{2} (995/sq mi)
- Time zone: UTC+1 (CET)
  - Summer (DST): UTC+2 (CEST)
- Postal code: DK-3220 Tisvildeleje

Tisvilde is a small town, with a population of 1,341 (1 January 2026), located on the north coast of the island Zealand (Sjælland) in Denmark 60 km (37 mi) in Gribskov Municipality, northeast of Hillerød.

Tisvildeleje is the coastal part of Tisvilde. "Leje" roughly translates as "plain" and used to be a fishermen's village. Now all of the fishermen's houses are used as "quintessential" summer residences. The southeast of Tisvilde is referred to as Tibirke.

Tisvilde, alongside Hornbæk farther to the east, has the highest prices of summer houses in Denmark. A 175 sqn summer house was sold for DKK22 mio. (about $3.3 million) in 2017.

== Etymology ==
The etymology of Tisvilde is not known for certain. As "Ti's vælde" it can be understood as “Where Tyr Reigns” (Ti is a common word for Tir (Týr) in Danish place names). "Væld" also means a spring, perhaps a reference to Helene Spring. "Væld" is similar to the old Norse word "ved" or "wald" meaning forest. Tisvilde was previously covered by extensive oak woods, before the sand drifts began.

The word Leje is used in several other place names in Denmark, such as Liseleje west of Tisvildeleje or Rågeleje and Gilleleje to the east.

== Landmarks ==
=== Natural ===
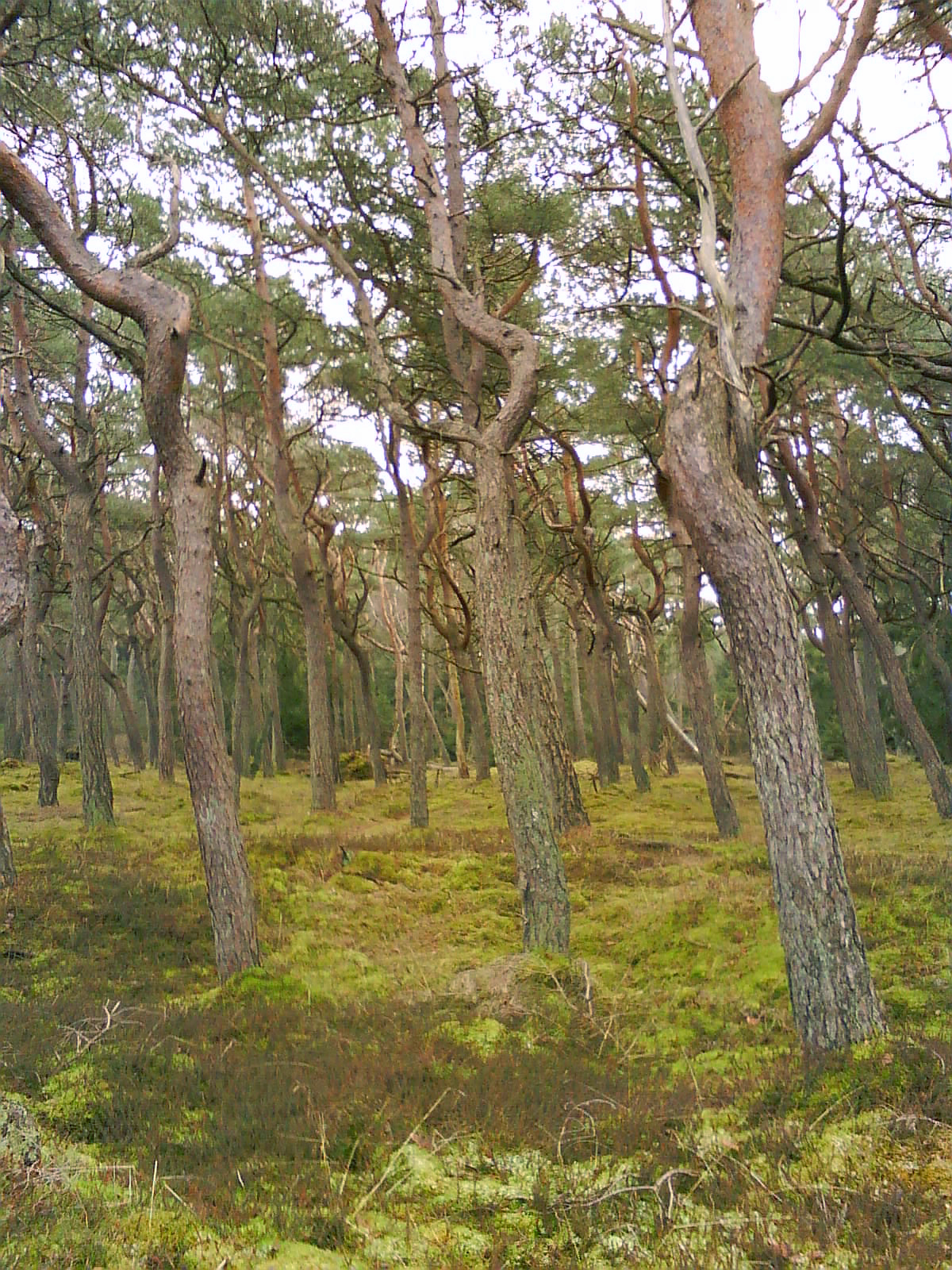
Pine trees in the protected plantation of Tisvilde Hegn.

==== Tisvilde Hegn ====
From around 1500, drifting sands began to bury the fields and farms around Tisvilde. The problem accelerated over the years and by 1700, most of the area had been deserted. Several attempts to counter the forces of nature, had been tried, but in 1724 the German Johan Ulrich Røhl was hired by the Crown and by help of the local peasants and 100 soldiers from Copenhagen, they managed to stop the dunes in the course of the 1730s, by covering them with seaweed and digging trenches. But while the dunes was successfully stopped in their march against civilisation, the sands had covered and transformed the countryside and made it completely barren. From around 1800 to 1900 this state was reversed, by planting the c. 1,300 ha forest of Tisvilde Hegn in association with the plantations of Asserbo and Liseleje southwest. The first tree species to be planted was scots pine and later followed by spruce, birch, beech and oak. Tisvilde Hegn is the oldest plantation in Denmark and now a Natura 2000 area, due to its rare habitat-types, flora and fauna and important birdlife. This area is a part of the Kongernes Nordsjælland National Park. Some of the species protected here are northern crested newt and large white-faced darter.

The coastline at Tisvilde Hegn is known for its stretches of white, clean and child-friendly sandy beaches.

==== Springs ====
- Helene Spring is one of Denmark's most famous springs, and legend has it that anyone whose illness has not responded successfully to other forms of treatment must come to the spring on 23 June (Sankt Hans Eve or Midsummer's Eve). Culturally, legend in Denmark has it that if one consumes a certain amount of water from its springs in the night and then stays at Saint Helene's grave until morning, he should be cured of all his sicknesses.
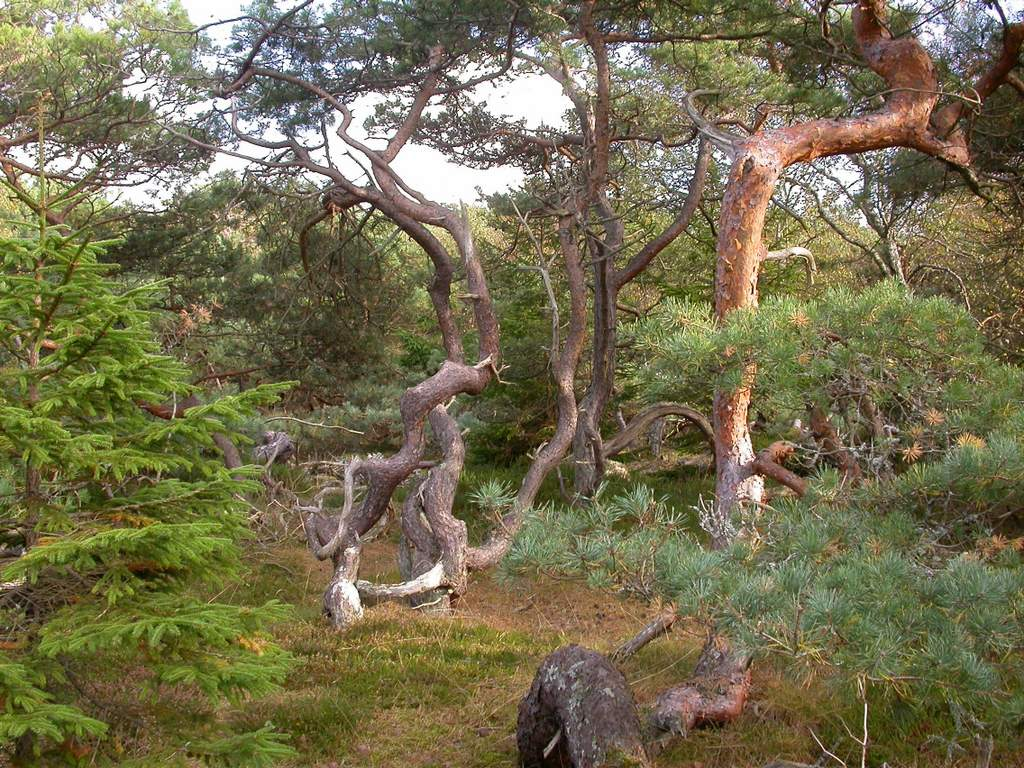
Gnarled pine trees in Tisvilde Hegn

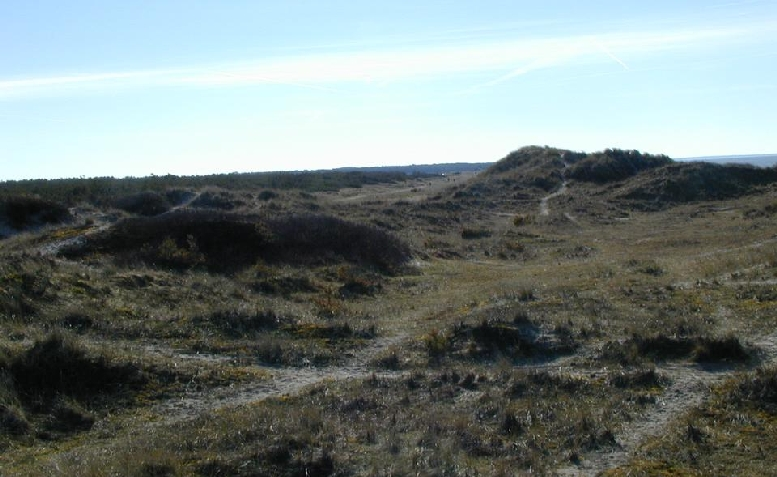
Coastal landscape at Tisvilde

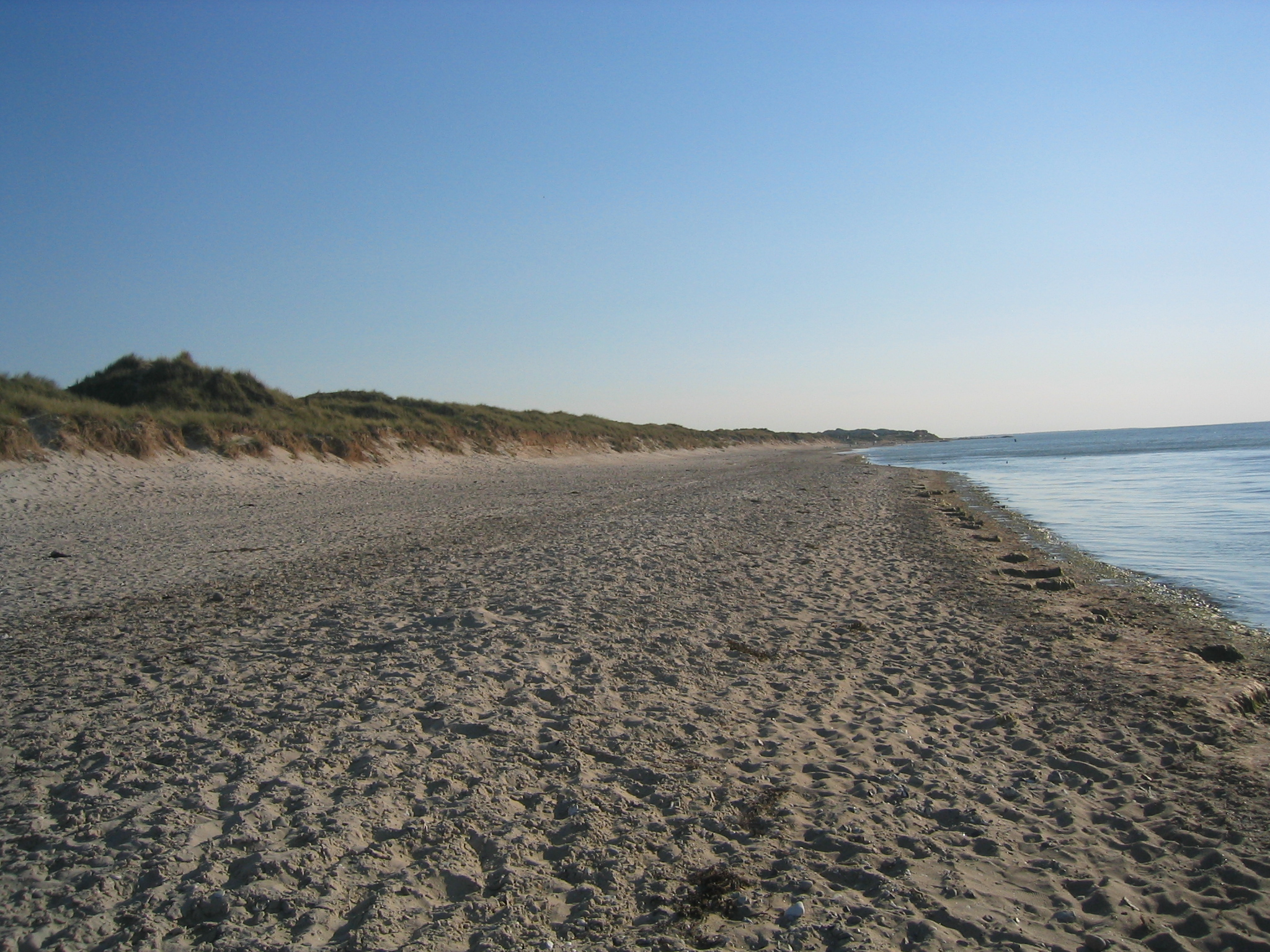
The beach along Tisvilde Hegn.

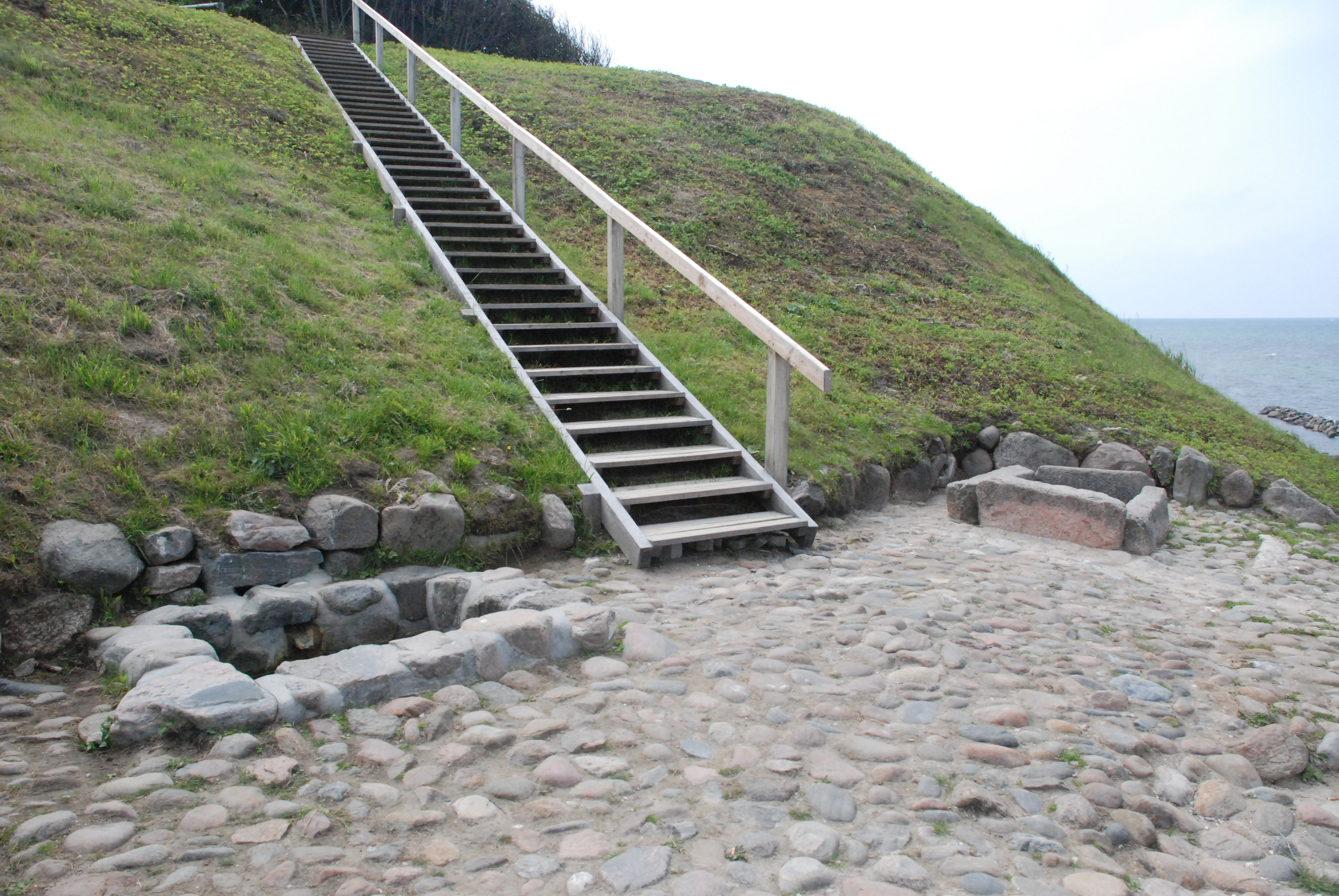
The Helene Spring.

=== Manmade ===
- Tibirke Church was built on the site of an ancient "vi", a pre-Christian holy place. At the foot of the church near Bækkebrovej is a spring which may have been the place where pilgrims came in days of old. The church was originally the center of a small village with 10 farms, but they were all (including Tibirke Church) buried by drifting sand dunes and abandoned by order of the King in 1725.
- Helene's Tomb is now a rectangular, grazed area surrounded by low stone fences. The two boulders leaning against each other indicate Helene's Tomb. It is located at Sankt Helenevej, 3220 Tisvildeleje.
- Wieth-Knudsen Observatory built in 1959, is located in southern part of the town. The observatory is offering astronomical meetings open to the public, twice each month throughout the year.
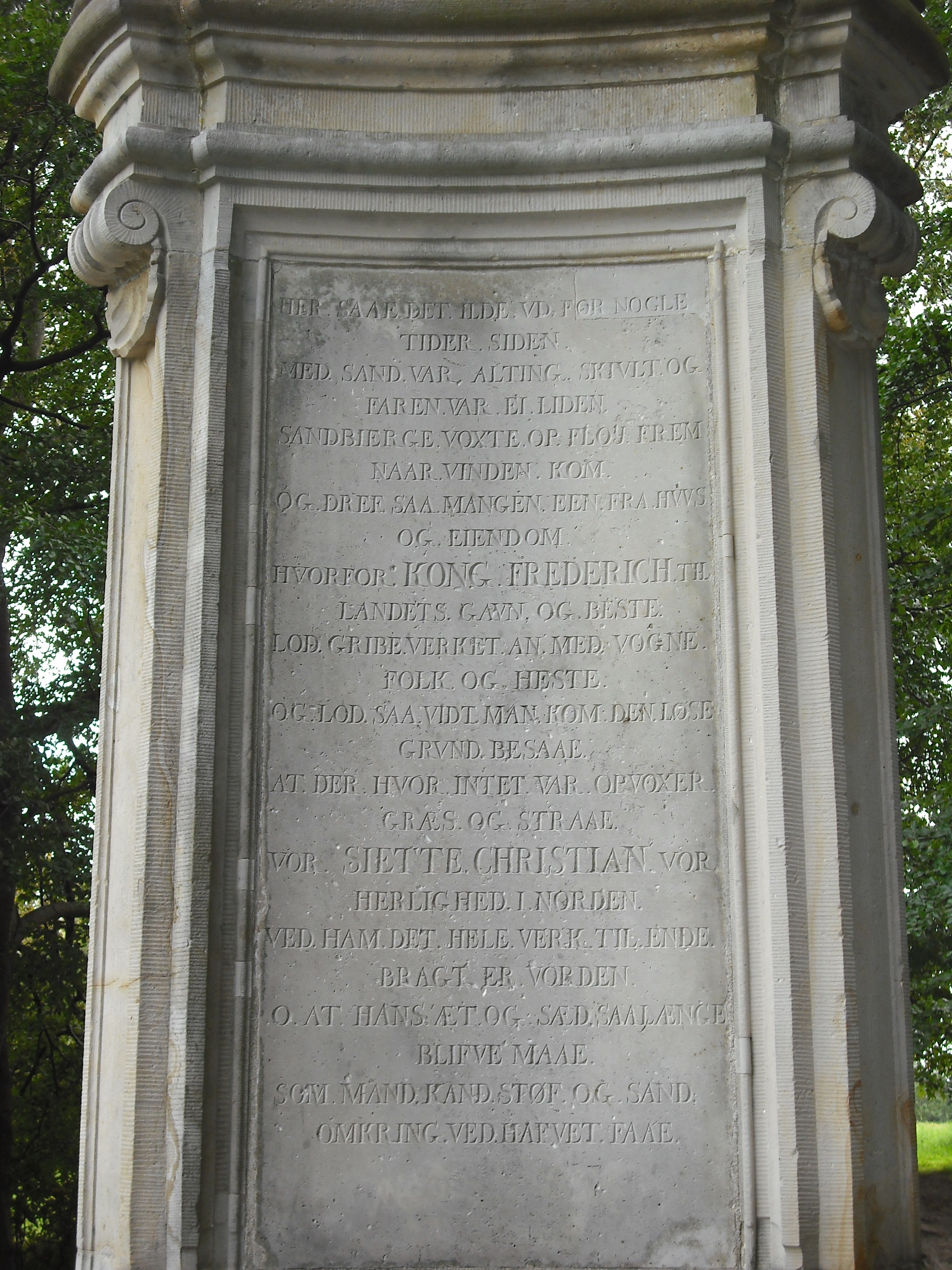
The Drifting Sands Monument in Tisvilde, raised in 1738. Texts in Danish, German and Latin.

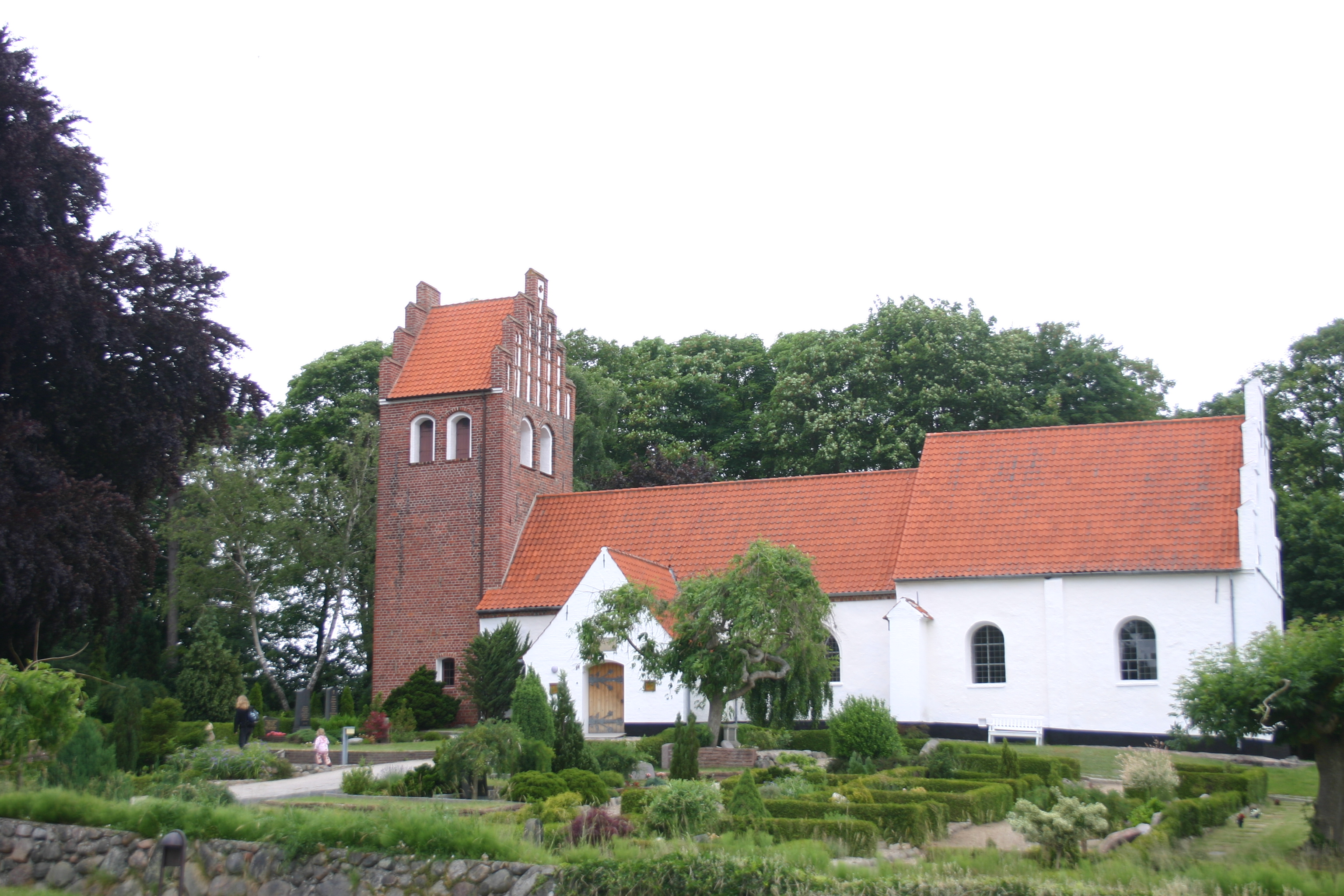
Tibirke Church, once nearly covered by drifting sands.

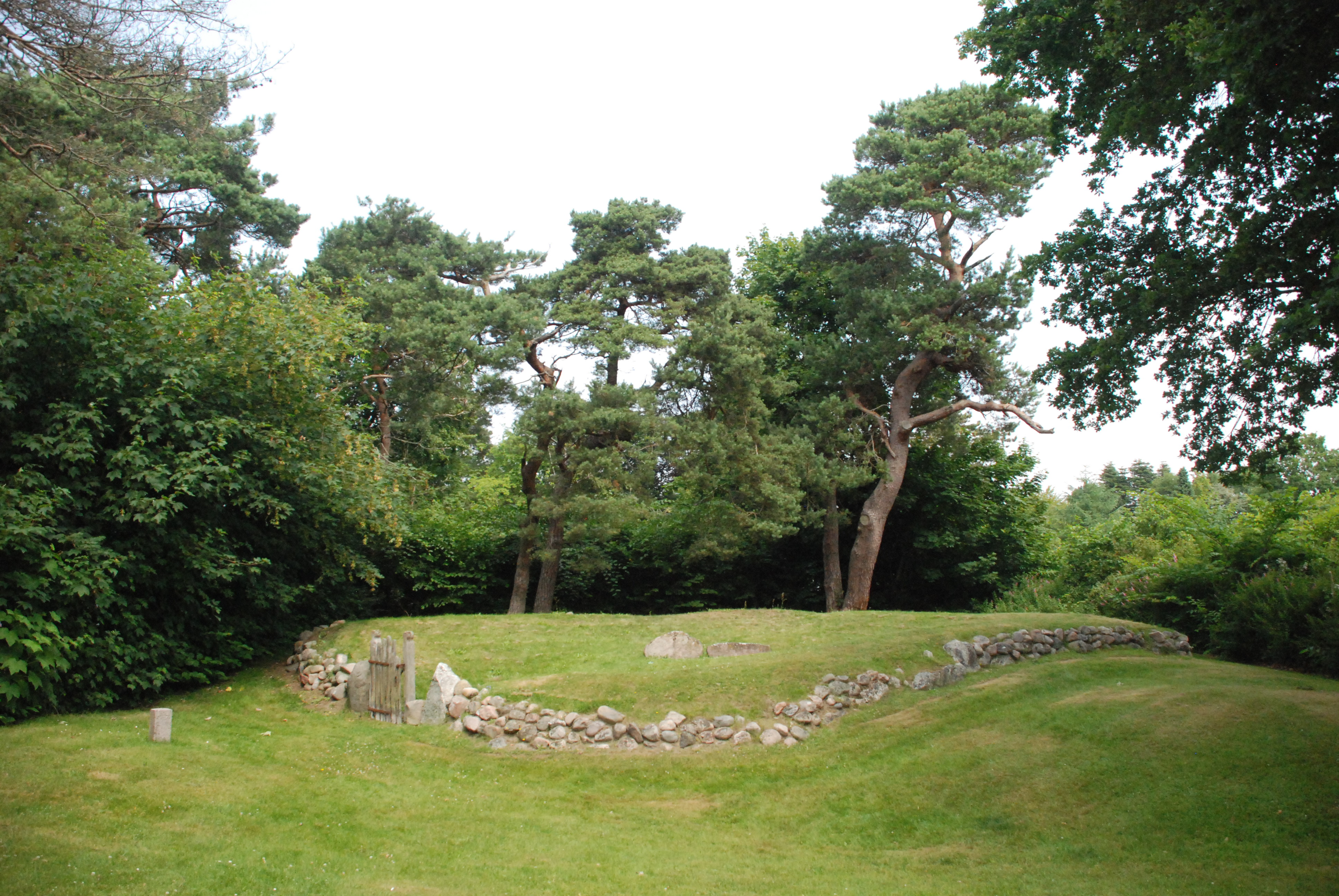
Helene's Tomb.

== Events and activities ==
Being a popular summer destination for tourists, the level of activity is at its peak during the summer months. Examples are:

- Tisvilde flea market. Every Saturday throughout the summer a large, lively flea market (Tisvilde Loppemarked) is held in the Birkepladsen in front of Tisvildeleje station. The flea market is exclusively for private individuals, which means stalls full of unique finds from box-rooms and attics.
- Musik i Lejet (English: Music in "Lejet"). An annual outdoor music festival held each summer.
- Tisvilde Yoga Festival An annual Yoga festival held in the summer by Tisvildeleje beach

== Notable people ==
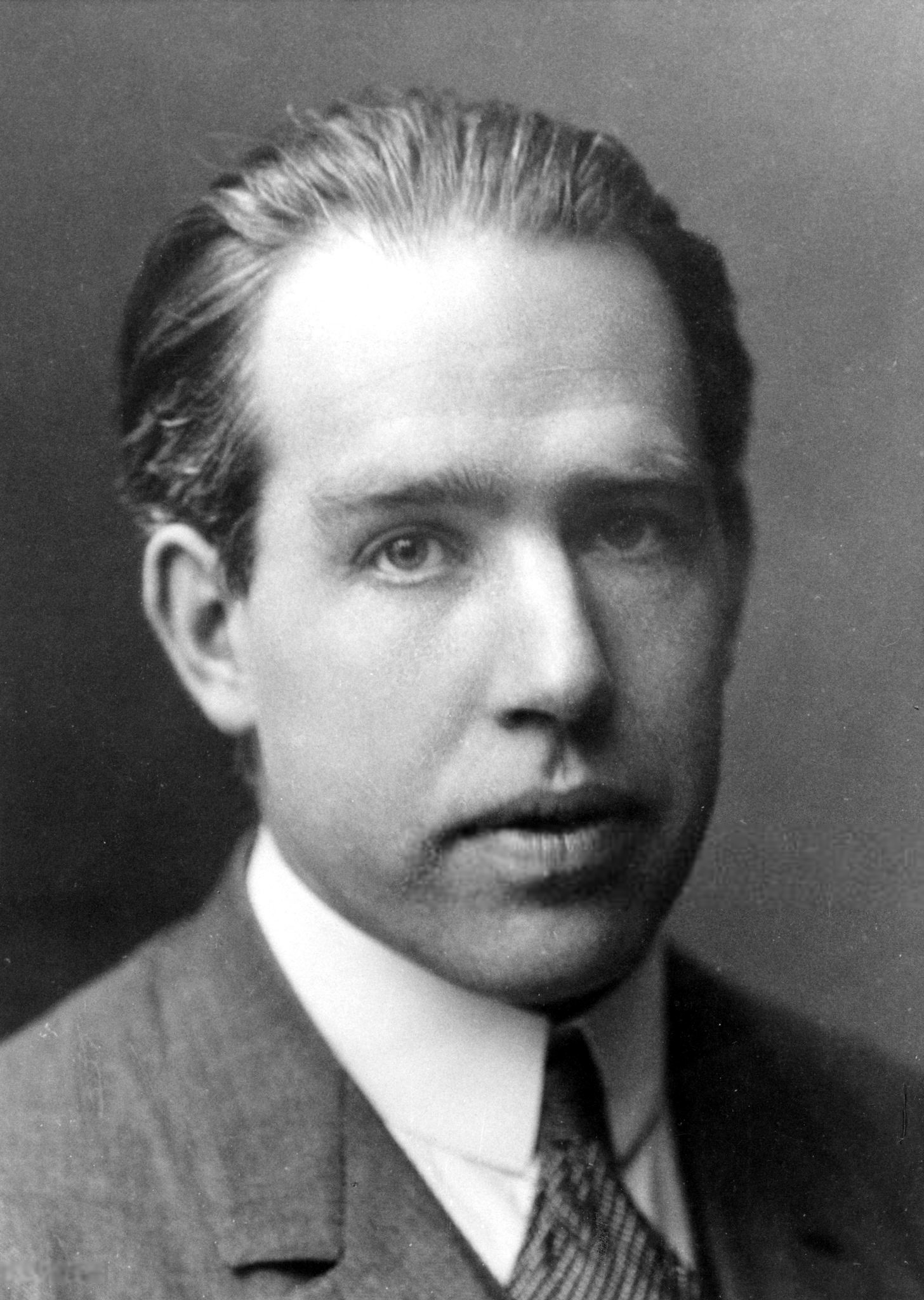
Niels Bohr, 1922

- Johannes V. Jensen (1873–1950) a Danish writer, awarded the Nobel Prize in Literature in 1944; lived in Tisvilde
- Niels Bohr (1885–1962) a Danish physicist who contributed to understanding atomic structure and quantum theory, for which he received the Nobel Prize in Physics in 1922; he lived in Tisvilde much of the time.
- William Scharff (1886–1959) a Danish painter, a leading proponents of Cubism in Denmark, lived in Tisvilde
- Carl Jensen (1887–1961) a Danish painter and newspaper illustrator, he helped bring Cubism to Denmark; lived in Tisvilde from 1918
- Knudåge Riisager (1897–1974) a Danish composer, lived in Tisvilde
- Abraham Pais (1918–2000) a Dutch-American physicist and science historian, his doctoral dissertation prompted Niels Bohr to invite him to come to Tisvilde as his assistant
- Henrik Valeur (born 1966) a Danish architect-urbanist, brought up in Tibirke
- Jeremy Strong (born 1978), American actor; owns a vacation home in Tisvilde with his Danish-born wife.

== Literature ==
- Flemming Rune (2014): Tisvilde Hegn, Vol. 1, 2 and map-appendices, Forlaget Esrum Sø, ISBN 978-87-88393-35-4. (in Danish)
