= Carl Jensen (painter) =

Danish painter and newspaper illustrator

Hans Carl Jensen (1887–1961) was a Danish painter and newspaper illustrator. His debut was at Kunsternes Efterårsudstilling in 1915. With his early compositions, he was one of those who brought Cubism to Denmark. He worked as an illustrator for a variety of newspapers and journals including Klods-Hans, Gnisten, Blæksprutten, Ekstra Bladet and Politiken.

== Biography ==
Hans Carl Jensen was born in Copenhagen, Denmark. His parents were Christen Søren Jensen and Ane Margrethe Christensen. Jensen started to sketch before he was 20, contributing to the leading joke sheet Klods-Hans. He was a student at the Frede Aamodt studio 1905-06.

From 1905 to 1958, he worked as an illustrator for the Copenhagen papers. Initially, together with Aksel Jørgensen and Axel Nygaard, his sketches were directed at depicting the dreadful conditions for the poor. Later, during his 40 years with Politiken, he was more of a bipartisan cartoonist although he was still critical of the upper classes, especially the Liberal Party. He was behind a long series of caricatures of Prime Minister Niels Neergaard and Interior Minister Oluf Krag before the 1924 elections. He also contributed sketches to news reports, including illustrations of court rooms where photography was not allowed. His caricatures included cartoons of many of his artist friends from 1909 to 1920, published in Ekstra Bladet, and of Danish and foreign politicians, in Politiken. Initially his work was inspired by the satirical journal Simplicissimus but he soon found his own style, characterized by the quick, clear lines he used to depict in his cool, unemotional way the changing expressions and typical gestures of the figures of the day.

At the beginning of the First World War, he was one of the first to bring Cubism to Denmark. In 1918, he left Ekstra Bladet to move to Tisvilde where his friend William Scharff also worked, becoming one of the country's most important Cubists. Around 1920, he began painting watercolours and gouaches of Copenhagen's harbour and canals.

He was awarded the Eckersberg Medal in 1944. In 1930, he married Meretha Paulsen (1901-87). Their daughter, Lise Warburg (born 1932) is a textile artist and writer.
