= Carl Fredrik Jensen =

Norwegian judge and civil servant

- Born: 17 August 1855; Christiania, Norway
- Died: 3 January 1929 (aged 73); Oslo
- Occupations: Judge and civil servant
- Children: Christian Ludvig Jensen
- Parent: Christian Jensen
- Awards: Order of St. Olav

Carl Fredrik Jensen (17 August 1855 – 3 January 1929) was a Norwegian judge and civil servant.

== Biography ==
Jensen was born in Christiania to politician Christian Jensen and Birgitte Marie Lorck. He married Antonette Christiane Holtermann in 1884.

Jensen graduated with a cand.jur. in 1878 and was appointed to the Ministry of Finance from 1880. He was judge of the Kristiania city court from 1892 and held the position of chief justice from 1902 to 1905. He was decorated Knight, First Class of the Order of St. Olav in 1904. He died in Oslo in 1929.
