= Kamma Svensson =

Danish illustrator (1908–1998)

Karen Margrete Svensson (1908–1998) was a Danish illustrator who contributed drawings to Danish newspapers and magazines, especially Politiken. Her illustrated books include those by Lise Nørgaard and Johannes Møllehave. Svensson also created posters for Copenhagen's Tivoli and designed decorative plates and spoons for Royal Copenhagen.

== Early life ==
Born in Sønderborg on 28 November 1908, Karen Margrete Svensson was the daughter of the newspaper editor and politician Adolph Bernhard Svensson (1880–1963) and Kathrine Marie Billum (1884–1976). In 1929, she married the Berlin architect Heinrich Hartwig but the marriage was dissolved in 1935. In 1937, she married the business executive Helge Peter Emil Bech Emborg (1910–1995). Despite her marriages, Svensson continued to use her maiden name throughout her life. She had three children: Klaus (1932), Franz (1937) and Morten (1939).

During the First World War, Svensson lived with her mother and siblings in Flensburg while her father was called up to join the German forces. In 1920, the family settled in Haderslev in southern Jutland where in 1927 she graduated from Haderslev Cathedral School. She then studied painting for a short period under Harald Slott-Møller, took a study trip to Paris and attended the Berlin Academy from 1930 to 1933.

== Career ==
Svensson first exhibited at the 1937 Sønderjysk Udstilling (Southern Jutland Exhibition]] in Charlottenborg, also exhibiting there at the autumn show the following year. Creating mainly drawings of children, she presented her work at various exhibitions until the mid-1940s. After the war, she began illustrating children's books, including Margit Wohlin's Kan Familien reddes (1946), Else Sigfred-Pedersen's Barnet under mit Hjerte (1947), and Pearl S. Buck's Børnene og Verden (1947). She soon began to contribute illustrations to newspapers and magazines, including Dagens Nyheder, Berlingske Tidende and above all Politiken where she was employed from 1950 to 1971.

From 1945, her works became increasingly colourful, often inspired by bible stories and fairy tales. Her later works were exhibited at Danske bladtegnere (1980), Kunstnere for fred (1983) and the exhibitions of the Women's Artists Association (Kvindelige Kunstneres Samfund) in 1976 and 1986. Her last work was the richly illustrated picture book Da Prosper Alpanus og Rosabelle Verde tryllede om kap (1987).

Kamma Svensson died in Copenhagen on 11 February 1988.
