= Bernhard Bang =

Danish veterinarian (1848–1932)

Bernhard Lauritz Frederik Bang
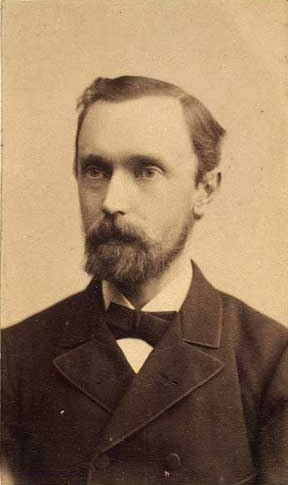
- Born: 7 June 1848; Sorø, Denmark
- Died: 22 June 1932 (aged 84); Copenhagen, Denmark
- Known for: Brucella abortus
- Scientific career
- Fields: Veterinary

Bernhard Lauritz Frederik Bang (7 June 1848 – 22 June 1932), was a Danish veterinarian. He discovered Brucella abortus in 1897, which came to be known as Bang's bacillus. Bang's bacillus was the cause of the contagious Bang's disease (now known as Brucellosis) which can cause pregnant cattle to abort, and causes undulant fever in humans.

== Early life and education ==
Bang was born on 7 June 1848 in Sorø, the son of school teacher at Sorø Academy and later titular professor Jacob Henrik Bang (1809–99) and Laura Louise Marie Josephine Moth (1814–91). He graduated from Sorø Academy in 1865 and then enrolled at the University of Copenhagen where he studied medicine. He became a Master of Medicine in 1872 and then continued his studies at the Royal Veterinary and Agricultural University from where he qualified as a Veterinarian in 1873.

== Career ==
Bang began to work at Almindelig Hospital and Copenhagen Municipal Hospital while in the same time briefly practicing as a physician in Nørrebro. He stayed five years at Copenhagen Municipal Hospital.

Bang seemed to have abandoned the idea of pursuing a career in veterinary sciences, but after professor Harald Viggo Stockfleth's death, he was encouraged by director C.E. Fenger to apply for a position as teacher at the Royal Veterinary and Agricultural University. On 1 January 1880, he assumed a position as a teacher of surgery and leader of the ambulatory clinic.

In July 1880, he was awarded his M.D. for his doctoral thesis Iagttagelser og Studier over dødelig Embolie og Thrombose i Lungearterierne. He later became the director of the college. Bang was a veterinary adviser to the Danish government.

For his contributions to veterinary medicine, he received an honorary doctorate from the Veterinary College of Utrecht in 1921.

== Legacy ==
Bang is known for his work on:

- development of a control for bovine tuberculosis
- research on smallpox vaccination
- research on animal bacillary disease

== Personal life ==
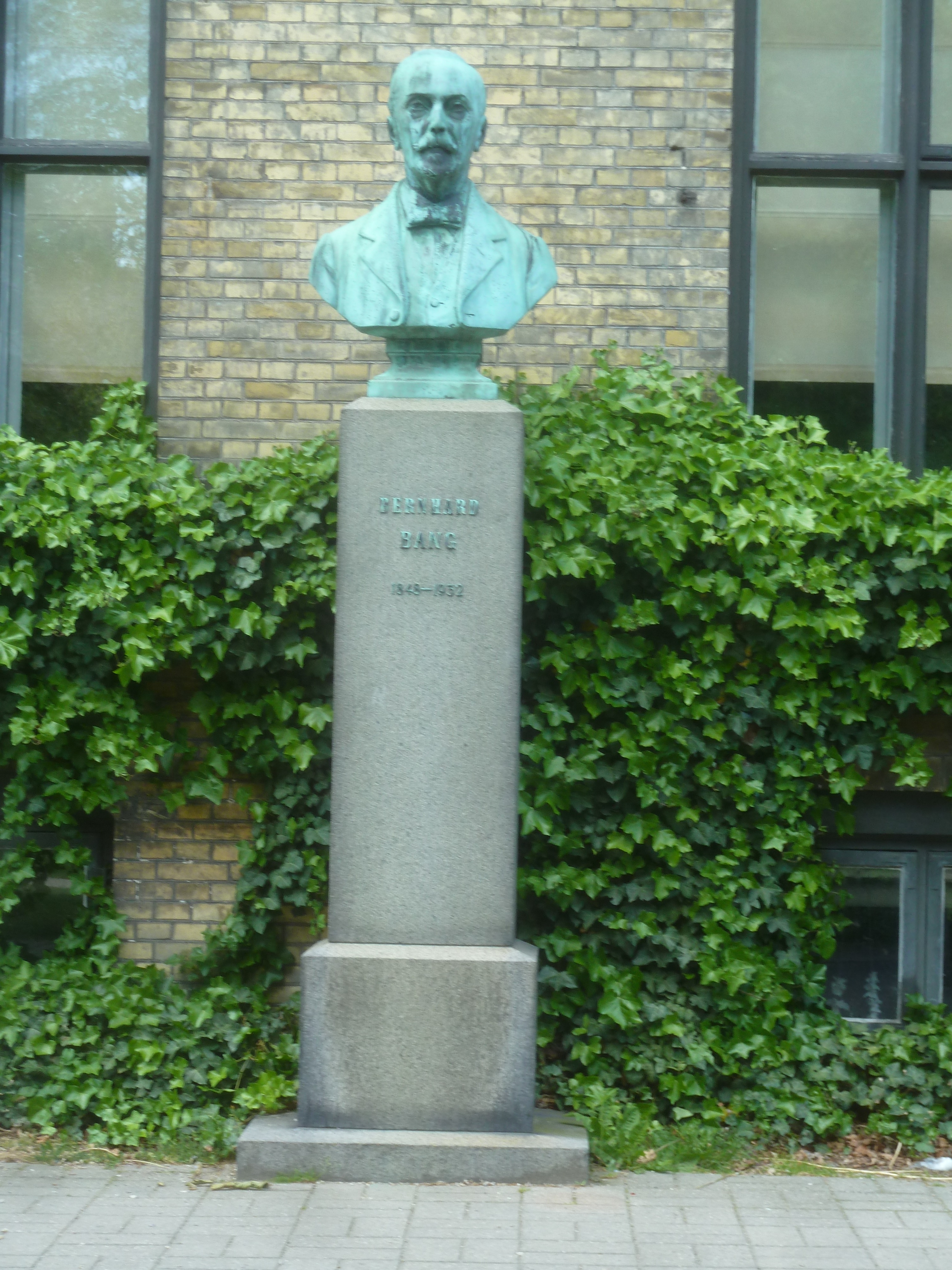
Bust of Bernhard Bang

Bang married Anna Elisabeth Caroline Klee (20 October 1844 - 3 November 1922), a daughter of civil servant Frederik Klee (1808–64) and Caroline F. S. M. N. Moth (1812–84), on 20 December 1874 in Sorø.

He died on 22 June 1932 in Frederiksberg and is buried at Solbjerg Park Cemetery.

In the former grounds of the Royal Veterinary and Agricultural University, now the University of Copenhagen's North Campus, stands a bust of Bernhard Bang. It was created by August Hassel. Bernhard Bangs Allé, a side street to Dalgas Boulevard, is named after him.
