= Norwegian Bar Association =

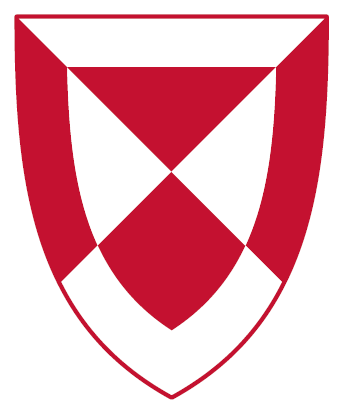
The association's heraldic emblem from 1983

The Norwegian Bar Association (Norwegian: Den Norske Advokatforening) is an association of Norwegian lawyers. It was established in 1908 as Den Norske Sakførerforening, and assumed its current name from 1965. As of 2008 the association had about 7,000 members. Among its publications are the journals Norsk Retstidende and Rettens Gang.

== Leaders ==
As of 2018, the association is chaired by Jens Johan Hjort, while Merete Smith has been secretary-general since 2003. Former leaders of the association include Valentin Voss (1938–1941), Henning Bødtker (1941 and 1945–1947), Sven Arntzen (1959–1961), Jens Christian Mellbye (1965–1968), Per Brunsvig (1976–1979), Hans Stenberg-Nilsen (1985–1988), and Berit Reiss-Andersen (2008–2012).
