= 1849 in Denmark =

- Decades: 1820s; 1830s; 1840s; 1850s; 1860s
- See also: Other events of 1849; List of years in Denmark

Events from the year 1849 in Denmark.

== Incumbents ==
- Monarch – Frederick VII
- Prime minister – Adam Wilhelm Moltke

== Events ==
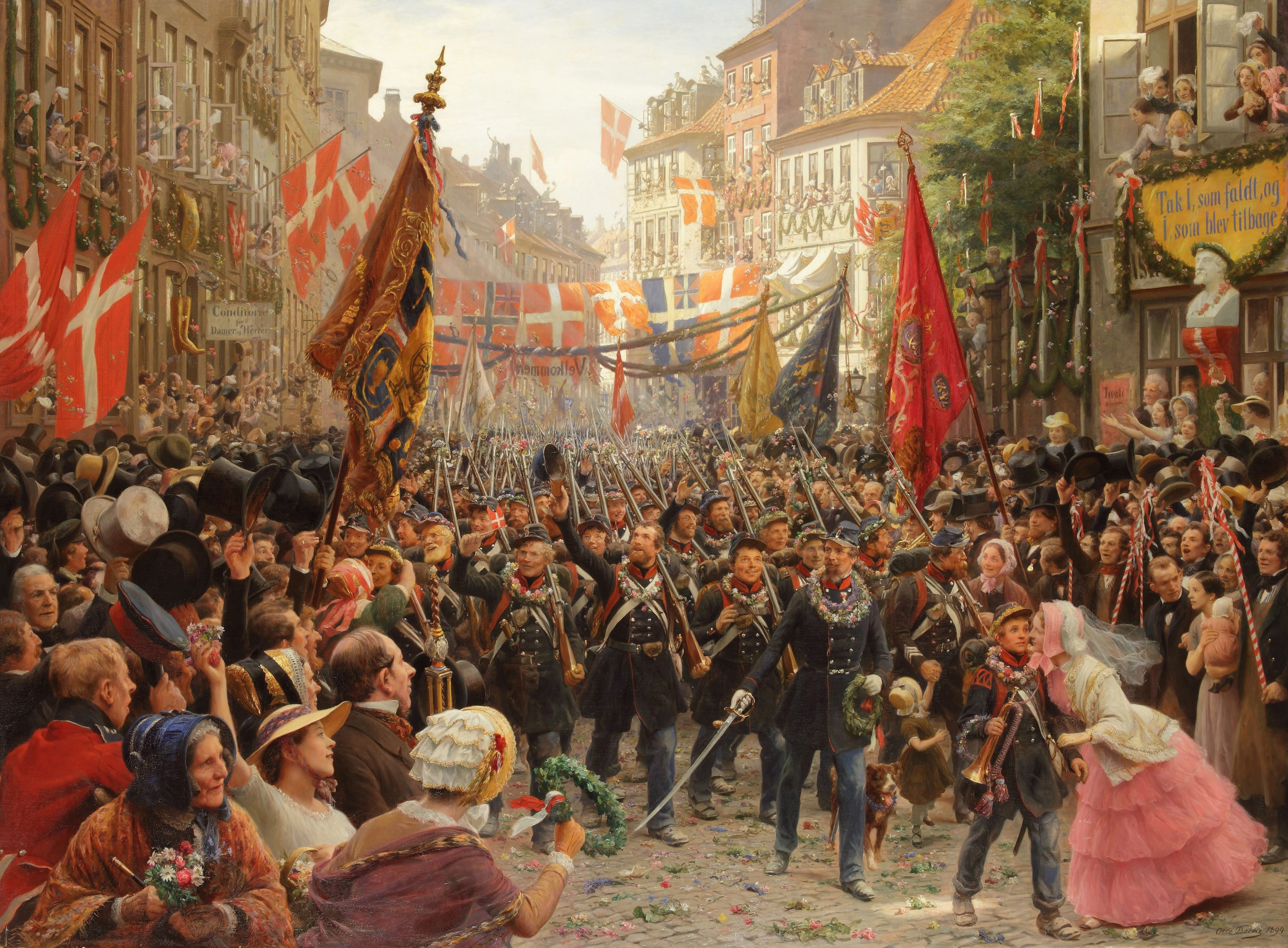
Danish soldiers return to Copenhagen in 1849, painted by Otto Bache in 1894.

- 12 January – General conscription is introduced in Denmark a few weeks after the First Schleswig War has been resumed after a winter break.
- 3 February – The Danish Veterinary Association is founded.
- 5 June – The Constitution of Denmark is signed by King Frederik VII.
- 4 December – First elections to the Folketing under the new constitution.

=== First Schleswig War ===
- 5 April – Battle of Eckernförde
- 12 April – Battle of Kolding
- 31 May – Skirmish of Århus
- 4 June – Battle of Heligoland
- 6 July – Battle of Fredericia

=== Date unknown ===
- The requirement for passports for journeys inside Denmark is abolished.
- The Danish West Indian daler replaces the rigsdaler as the currency of the Danish West Indies.

== Births ==
=== January–March ===
- 16 January – Hans Ole Brasen, painter (died 1930)
- 19 February – Ida Falbe-Hansen, educator and women's activist (died 1922)
- 27 March – Albert Schou, photographer (died 1900)

=== April–June ===
- 26 April – Olaf Poulsen, comedic stage actor (died 1923)
- 3 May – Jacob Riis, photographer, journalist and activist (died 1914 in usa)
- 9 June – Michael Ancher, painter (died 1927)

=== July–September ===
- 5 July – Anthonore Christensen, painter (died 1926)
- 19 July – Louise Ravn-Hansen, painter (died 1909 in Germany)
- 21 July – Leopold Rosenfeld, composer (died 1909)
- 24 July – J. A. D. Jensen, naval officer and Arctic explorer (died 1936)
- 3 August – Axel Liebmann, composer (died 1876)
- 6 August – Gustav Frederik Holm, naval officer and Arctic explorer (died 1940)
- 14 August – Aksel Mikkelsen, educator (died 1929)
- 15 August – Frida Schmidt, suffragist (died 1934)
- 16 August – Johan Kjeldahl, chemist (died 1900)
- 23 August – Jørgen Conrad de Falsen, naval officer (born 1785 in Norway)
- 27 September – Nanna Liebmann, composer and music critic (died 1935)

=== October–December ===
- 27 October – Søren Anton van der Aa Kühle, brewer and businessman (died 1906)
- 5 November – Emil Blichfeldt, architect (died 1908)
- 11 November – Martin Nyrop, architect (died 1921)

== Deaths ==
=== April–June ===
- 10 April – Johan Ferdinand de Neergaard, county govvernor and landowner (born 1796)
- 3 May – Catharine Simonsen, soprano (born 1816)
- 27 May – Frederik Michael Ernst Fabritius de Tengnagel, military officer and landscape painter (born 1781)

=== July–September ===
- 19 July – Christian Tuxen Falbe, naval officer and explorer (born 1791)
- 15 August – Christopher Friedenreich Hage, merchant (born 1759)
- 20 August – Johan Carl Modeweg, industrialist (born 1782)
- 4 December – Georg Frederik Ursin, mathematician and astronomer (born 1797)

=== October–December ===
- 2 December – Poul Elias Windtmil Schlegel, physician (born 1784)
