= 1937 in Denmark =

- Decades: 1910s; 1920s; 1930s; 1940s; 1950s
- See also: Other events of 1937; List of years in Denmark

Events from the year 1937 in Denmark.

== Incumbents ==
- Monarch – Christian X
- Prime minister – Thorvald Stauning

== Events ==
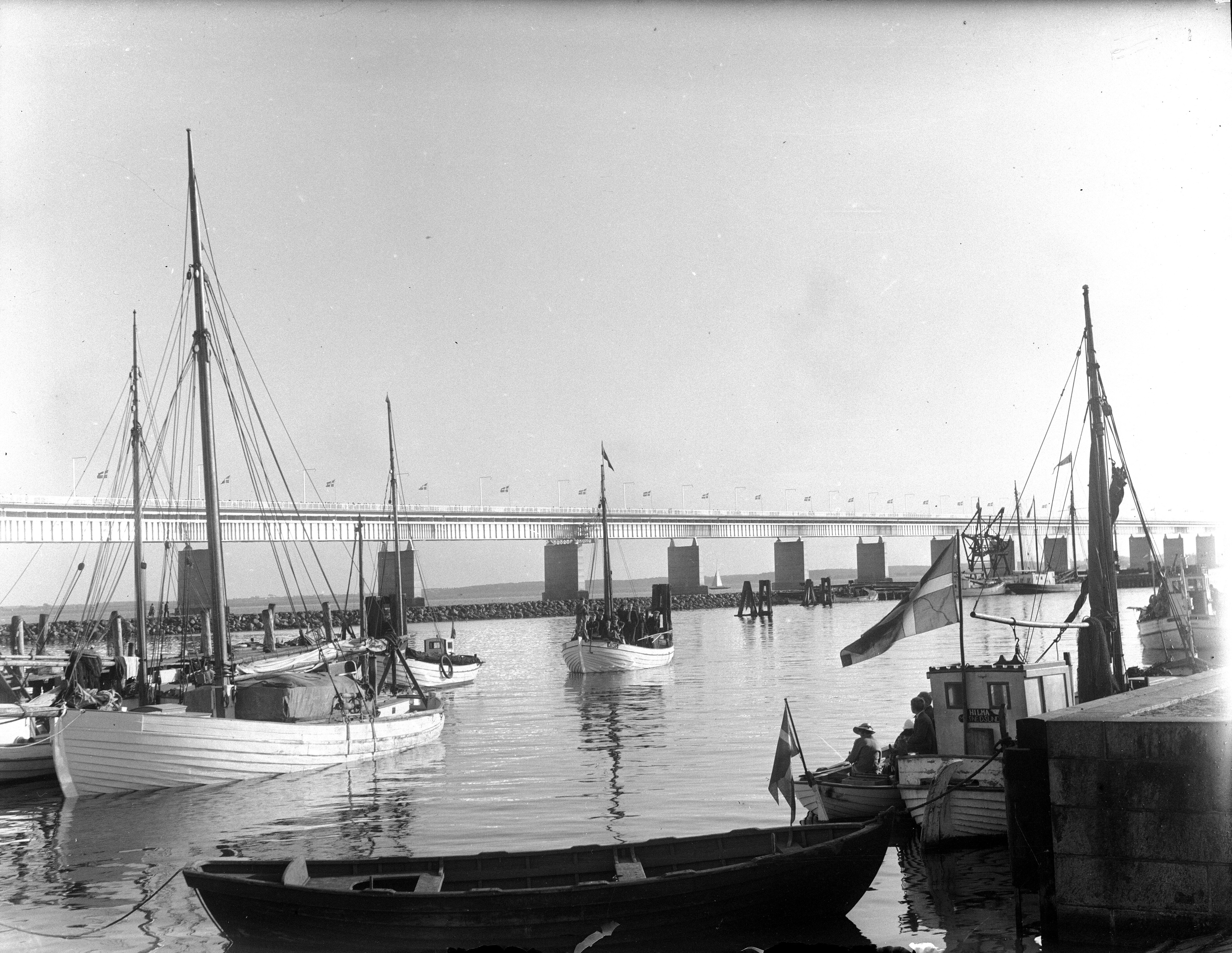
26 September: The inauguration of the Storstrøm Vridge between Zealand and Falster.

- 18 May – The state national police force Rigspolitiet – under command of one chief of police – begins operations.
- 1 August - Danish acquisition of Thule
- 26 September – The Storstrøm Bridge is inaugurated.
- 14 December – Many documents from the National Archives of Denmark, the Royal Danish Library and Copenhagen University Library relating to Norwegian conditions are transferred to Norway.

== Sports ==
=== Cycling ===
- 21–29 August – The 1937 UCI Track Cycling World Championships are held in Copenhagen.
- Kees Pellenaars (NED) and Frans Slaats (NED) win the Six Days of Copenhagen six-day track cycling race.

=== Football ===
- AB wins their third Danish football championship by winning the 1936–37 Danish Championship League.

== Births ==
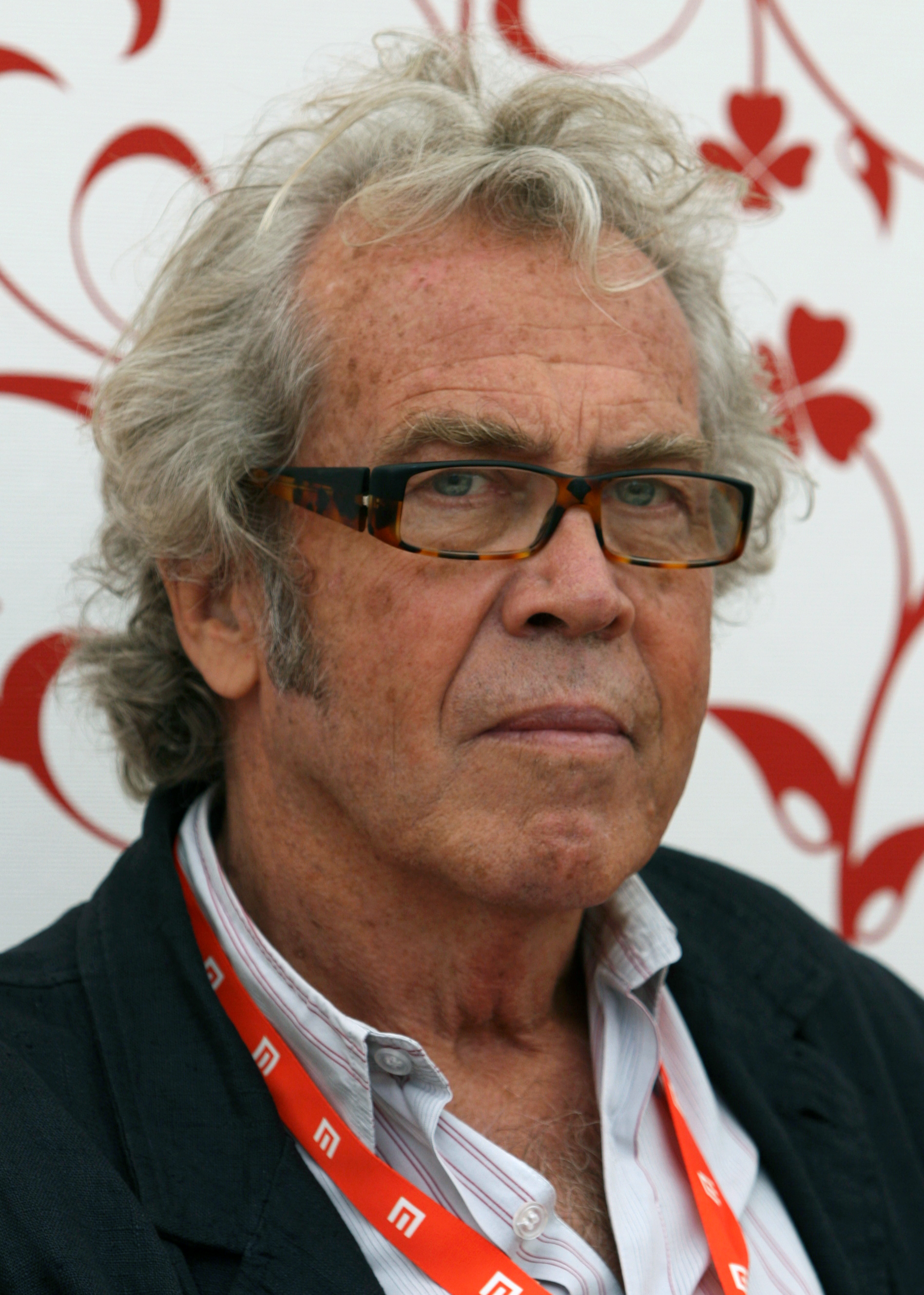
Jørgen Leth.

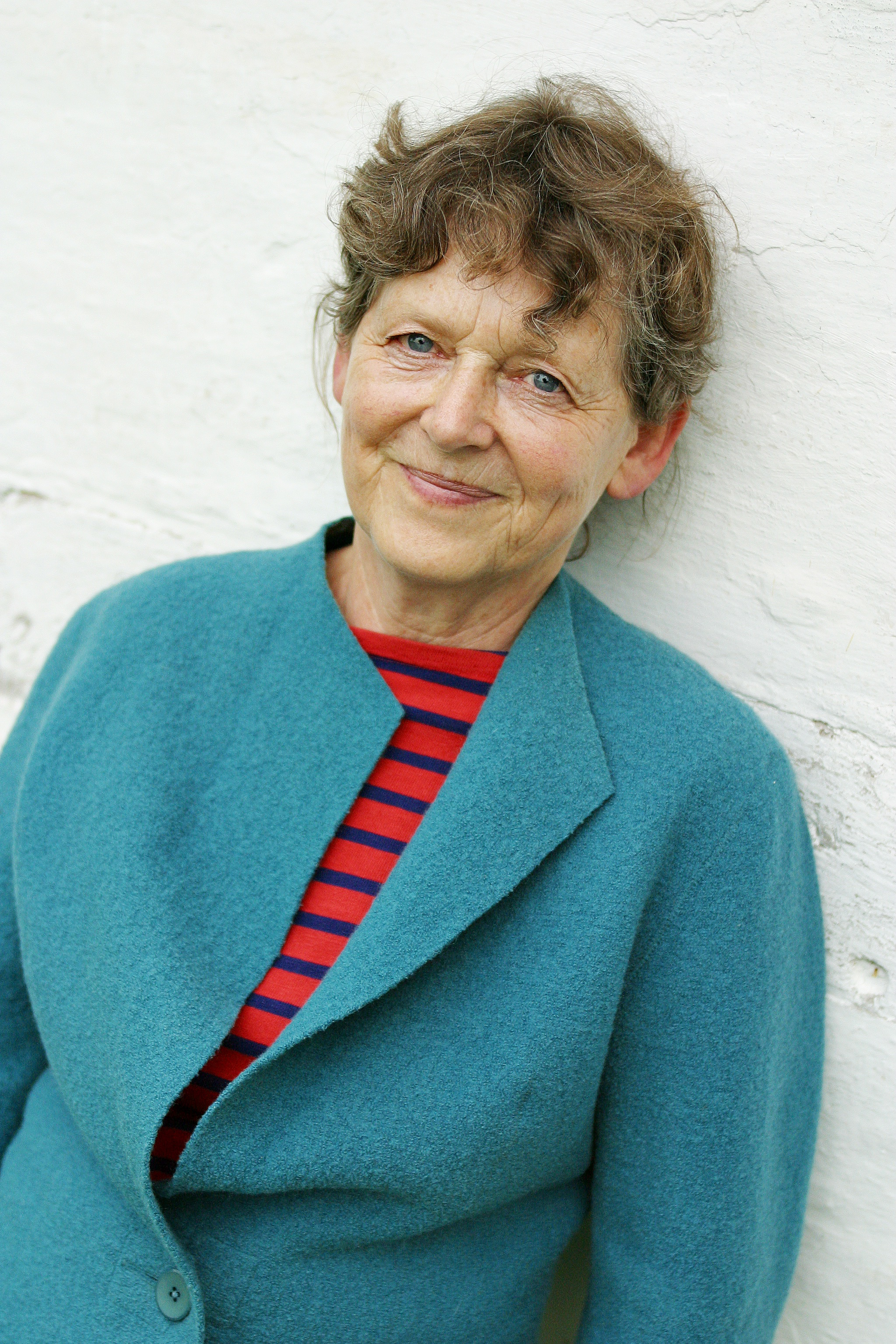
Ursula Munch-Petersen.

=== January–March ===
- 14 January – Erland Kops, badminton player (died 2017)
- 11 February – Anders Bodelsenm author (died 2021)

=== April–June ===
- 14 June – Jørgen Leth, film director, writer, poet (died 2025)

=== July–September ===
- 24 August – Bo Christensen, film producer (died 2020)

=== October–December ===
- 3 December – Søren Krarup, pastor, writer and politician (died 2023)
- 14 December – Aino Kann Rasmussen, archaeologist and curator
- 29 December – Ursula Munch-Petersen, ceramist

== Deaths ==
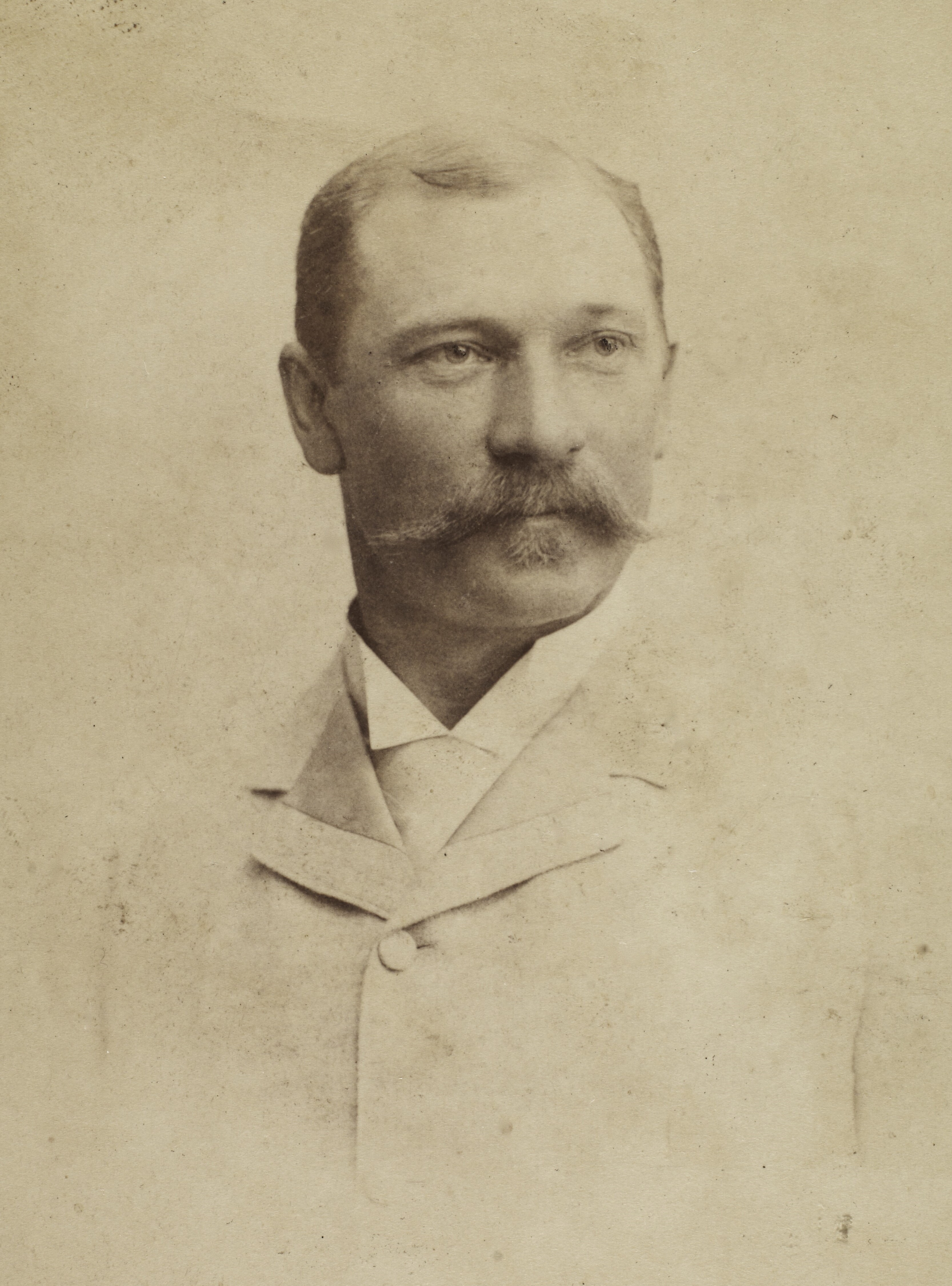
Hans Niels Andersen.

=== January–June ===
- 8 February – Martin Borch, architect (born 1852)
- 22 March – Thorvald Aagaard, composer (born 1877)
- 7 May – Helge Rode, writer, critic and journalist (born 1870)
- 26 March – Edvard Ehlers, dermatologist (born 1863)
- 23 May – Frederik Tesdorpf, landowner qand politician (born 1854)
- 11 June – Agnes Slott-Møller, painter (born 1862)

=== July–December ===
- 14 November – Carl Hentzen, engineer (born 1863)
- 30 December – Hans Niels Andersen, businessman, founder of East Asiatic Company (born 1852)
