= 1855 in Denmark =

- Decades: 1830s; 1840s; 1850s; 1860s; 1870s
- See also: Other events of 1855; List of years in Denmark

Events from the year 1855 in Denmark.

== Incumbents ==
- Monarch – Frederick VII
- Prime minister – Peter Georg Bang

== Events ==
- 8 January – Sparekassen for Vordingborg og Omegn is established.

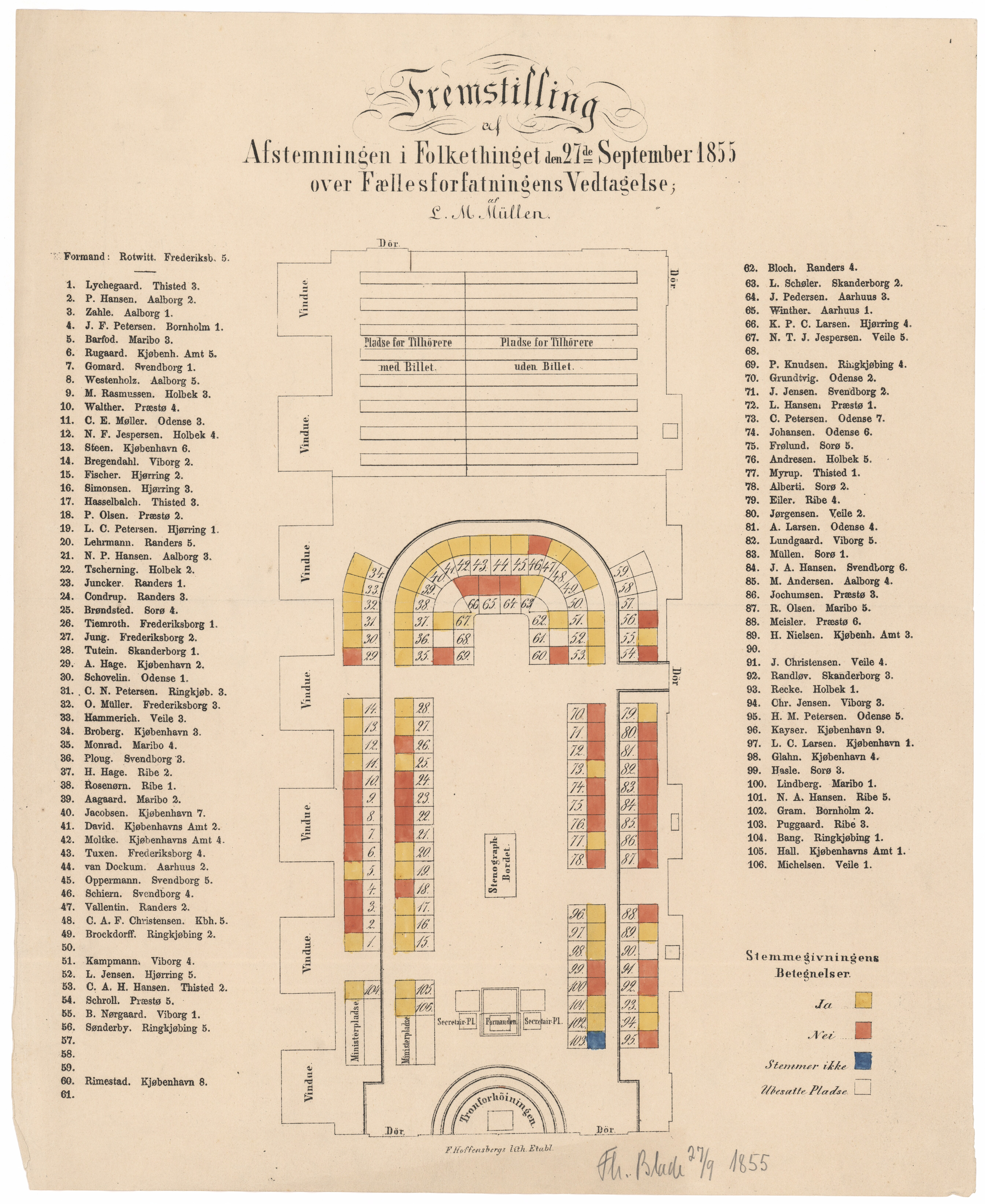
27 September: Fremstilling af Afstemningen i Folkethinget den 27de September 1855 over Fællesforfatningens Vedtagelse

- 31 October – Gads Forlag is founded by Gottlieb Ernst Clausen Gad.
- 18 November – Sødring & Co. is founded by Christopher Hansen Sødring and Frederik Marchus, Count Knuth til Knuthenborg.
- 27 September – A vote in Folketinget concerning the so-called fællesforfatning.

== Culture ==
=== Literature ===
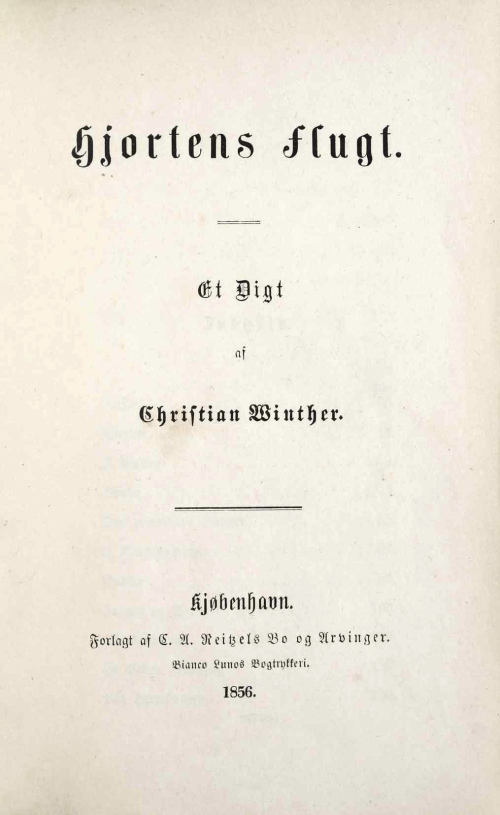
Ghortens Flugt.

- 27 November – Christian Winther publishes Hjortens Flugt. Et Digt.

== Births ==
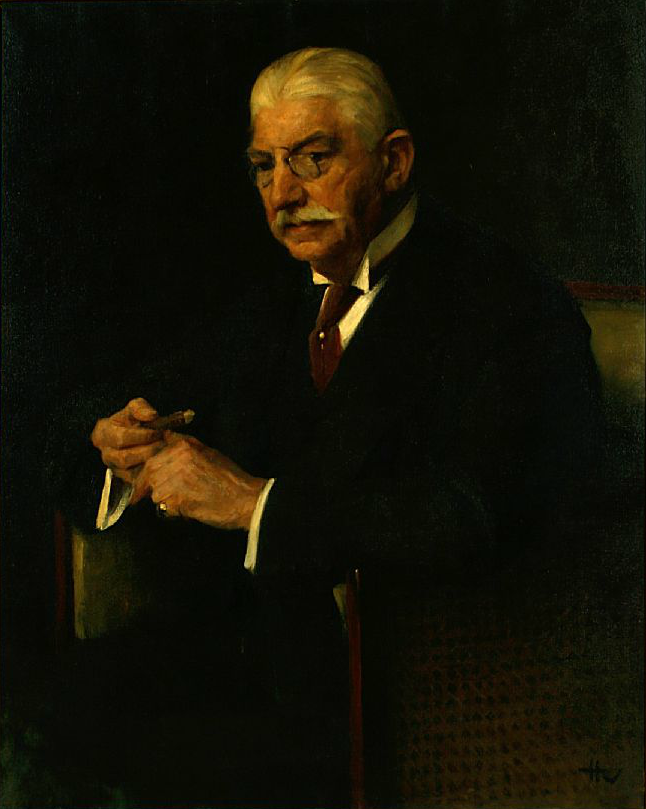
Carl Gammelgaard.

=== January–March ===
- 17 January – Alfred Benzon, pharmacist (died 1932)
- 14 February – Christian Bohrm physician (died 1911)
- 20 February – Fanny Garde, ceramist and designer (died 1928)
- 22 March – Karl Madsen, art historian, painter and arts administrator (died 1938)

=== July–September ===
- 9 July – Sara Ulrik, flower painter (died 1916)
- 29 August – Erik Henningsen, painter (died 1930)
- 20 September – Carl Gammeltoft, businessman (died 1034),

=== October–December ===
- 16 October – Carl Andreas Koefoed, agronomist (died 1948)
- 12 October – Charlotte Norrie, nurse and women's rights activist (died 1940)
- 20 October – Poul Simon Christiansen, painter and church decorator (died 1933)

== Deaths ==
- 8 March – Stephan Hegerm actor (born 1769)
- 11 November – Søren Kierkegaard, philosopher (born 1813)
- 25 November – Poul Christian Stemann, government official and landowner (born 1764)
