= 1852 in Denmark =

- Decades: 1830s; 1840s; 1850s; 1860s; 1870s
- See also: Other events of 1852; List of years in Denmark

Events from the year 1852 in Denmark.

== Incumbents ==
- Monarch – Frederick VII
- Prime minister – Adam Wilhelm Moltke (until 27 January ), Christian Albrecht Bluhme

== Events ==
- 7 May – The Den Borgerlige Velgørenheds Stiftelse is founded.
- 8 May – The London Protocol is signed in London, affirming the integrity of the Danish federation as a "European necessity and standing principle".
- 4 August – The 1852 Danish Folketing election is held: Although the National Liberal Party becomes the largest party, Christian Albrecht Bluhme of the Højre party remains Prime Minister after the elections.

=== Undated ===
- Tvede's Brewery on Vesterbrogade is inaugurated.

== Births ==
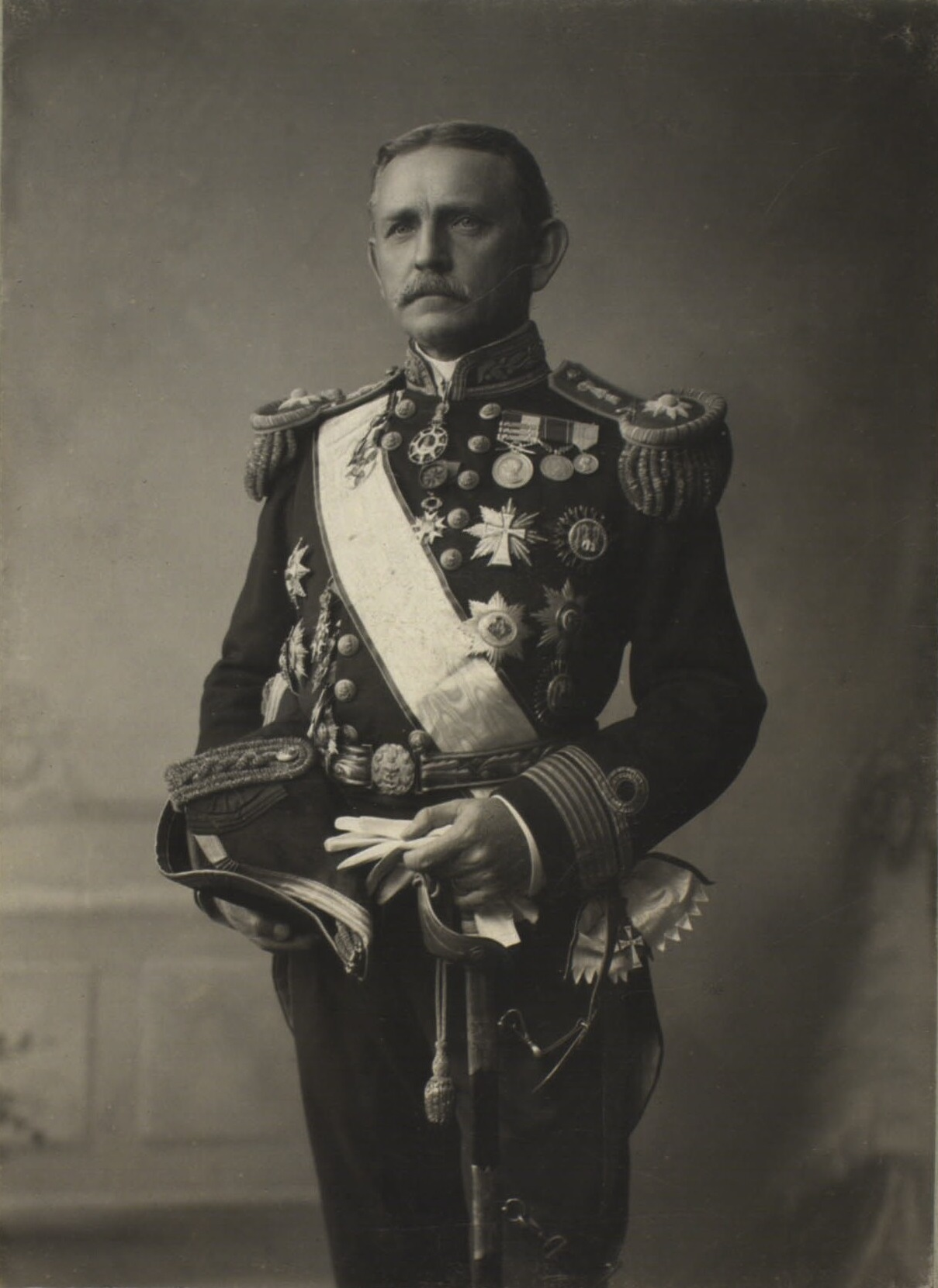
Andreas du Plessis de Richelieu.

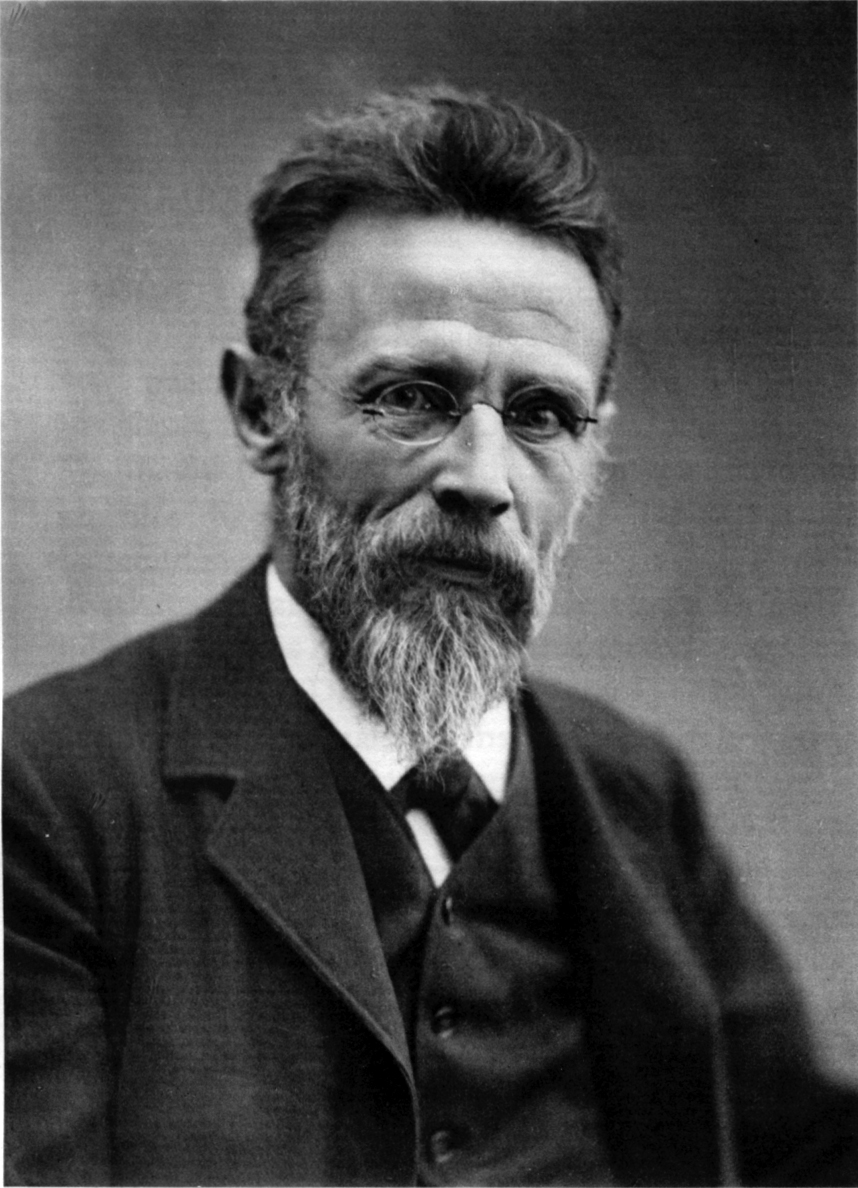
Kristian Erslev.

=== January–March ===
- 21 January – Emma Gad, writer (died 1921)
- 24 February – Andreas du Plessis de Richelieu, businessman (died 1932)
- 1 March – Martin Borch, architect (died 1937)
- 12 February – John Louis Emil Dreyerm astronomer (died 1926)
- 7 March – Anders Fonnesbech, businessman (died 1939)

=== April–June ===
- 25 May – Christian Hedemann, photographer (died 1932)

=== July–September ===
- 8 August – Malthe Engelsted, painter (died 1930)
- 14 August – Carl Aarsleff, sculptor (died 1918)
- 10 September – Hans Niels Andersen, businessman, founder of East Asiatic Company (died 1937)

=== October–December ===
- 20 October – Valdemar Koch, architect (died 1902)
- 28 December – Kristian Erslev, historian (died 1930)

== Deaths ==
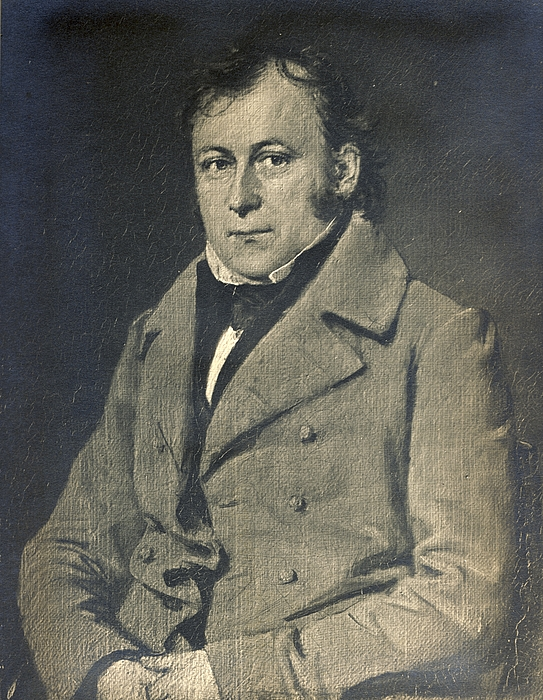
Joakim Frederik Schouw,

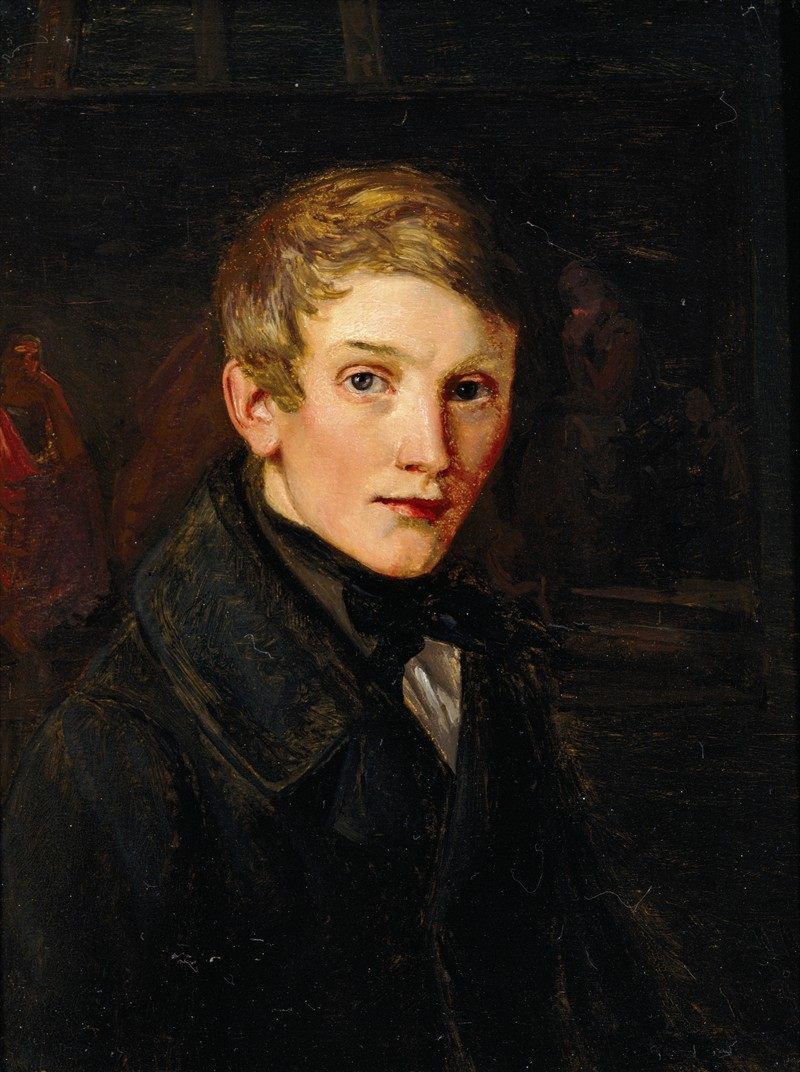
Dankvart Dreyer.

=== January–March ===
- 21 March – Marie Sophie of Hesse-Kassel, Queen Consort of Denmark (born 1767)

=== April–June ===
- 26 April – Christian Cornelius Lerche, landowner and county governor (born 1770)
- 28 April – Joakim Frederik Schouw, lawyer, botanist and politician (born 1789)

=== July–September ===
- 15 September – Johan Caspar Mylius, military officer and landowner (born 1776)

=== October–December ===
- 31 October – Andreas Schifter (born 1779)
- 4 November – Dankvart Dreyer, painter (born 1816)
- 24 November – Margrethe Schall, dancer (born 1775)
