= 1854 in Denmark =

- Decades: 1830s; 1840s; 1850s; 1860s; 1870s
- See also: Other events of 1854; List of years in Denmark

Events from the year 1854 in Denmark.

== Incumbents ==
- Monarch – Frederick VII
- Prime minister – Anders Sandøe Ørsted (until 12 December), Peter Georg Bang

== Events ==
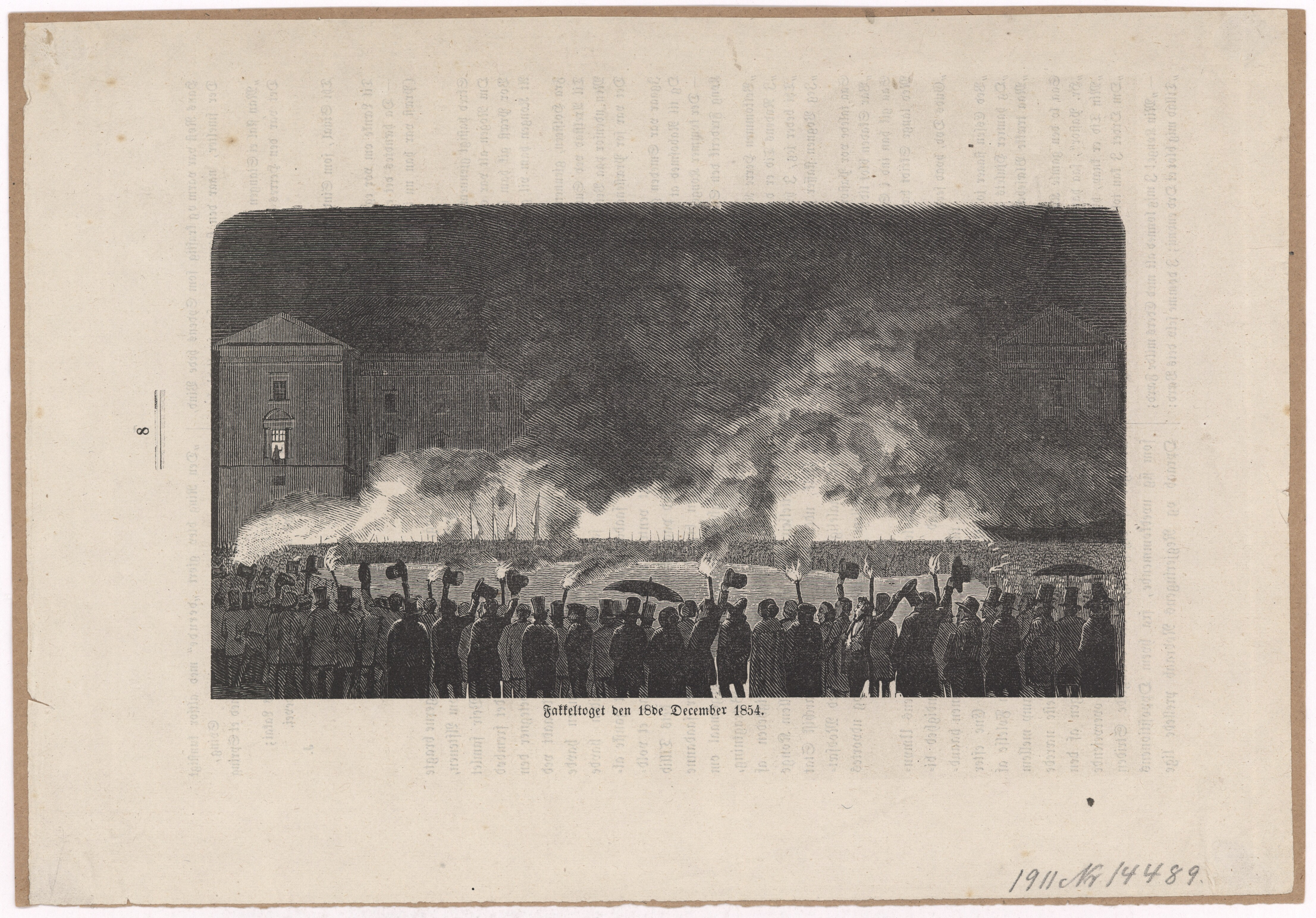
The National Liberal demonstration in Copenhagen.

- 2 May Realskolen for Frederiksberg og Vesterbro (later Schneekloths Skole) is founded.
- 26 July – The Cabinet of Ørsted adopts a helstatsforfatning.
- 12 December – The Cabinet of Bang-Scheel is formed.
- 18 December – A large National Liberal demonstration takes place in Copenhagen.

=== Undated ===
- Lumskebugten opens at Nordre Toldbod in Copenhagen.
- Sophus Berendsen establishes as wholesaler of iron and glass for the construction industry in Copenhagen (later developing into Berendsen).
- Arent Nicolai Dragsted establishes his own goldsmith's workshop on Bredgade in Copenhagen.
- The company Frichs is founded by Søren Frich in Aarhus.
- Lauritz Rasmussen establishes a zinc and bronze foundry at Åbenrå 24 in Copenhagen.

== Culture ==
=== Performing arts ===
- 20 March – August Bournonville's ballet A Folk Tale receives its worl premiere at the Royal Danish Yjeatre.

== Births ==
- 13 January – Hector Frederik Estrup Jungersen, marine zoologist (died 1917)
- 26 January – Hans Kaarsberg, writer (died 1929)
- 27 June – Niels Neergaard, politician (died 1936)
- 15 August – L. A. Ring, painter (died 1933)
- 27 November – Johan Ludvig Heiberg, philologist and historian (died 1928)
- 3 December – Frederik Tesdorpf, landowner qand politician (died 1937)
- 15 December – Jens Peter Berthelsen, fencer (died 1934)

== Deaths ==
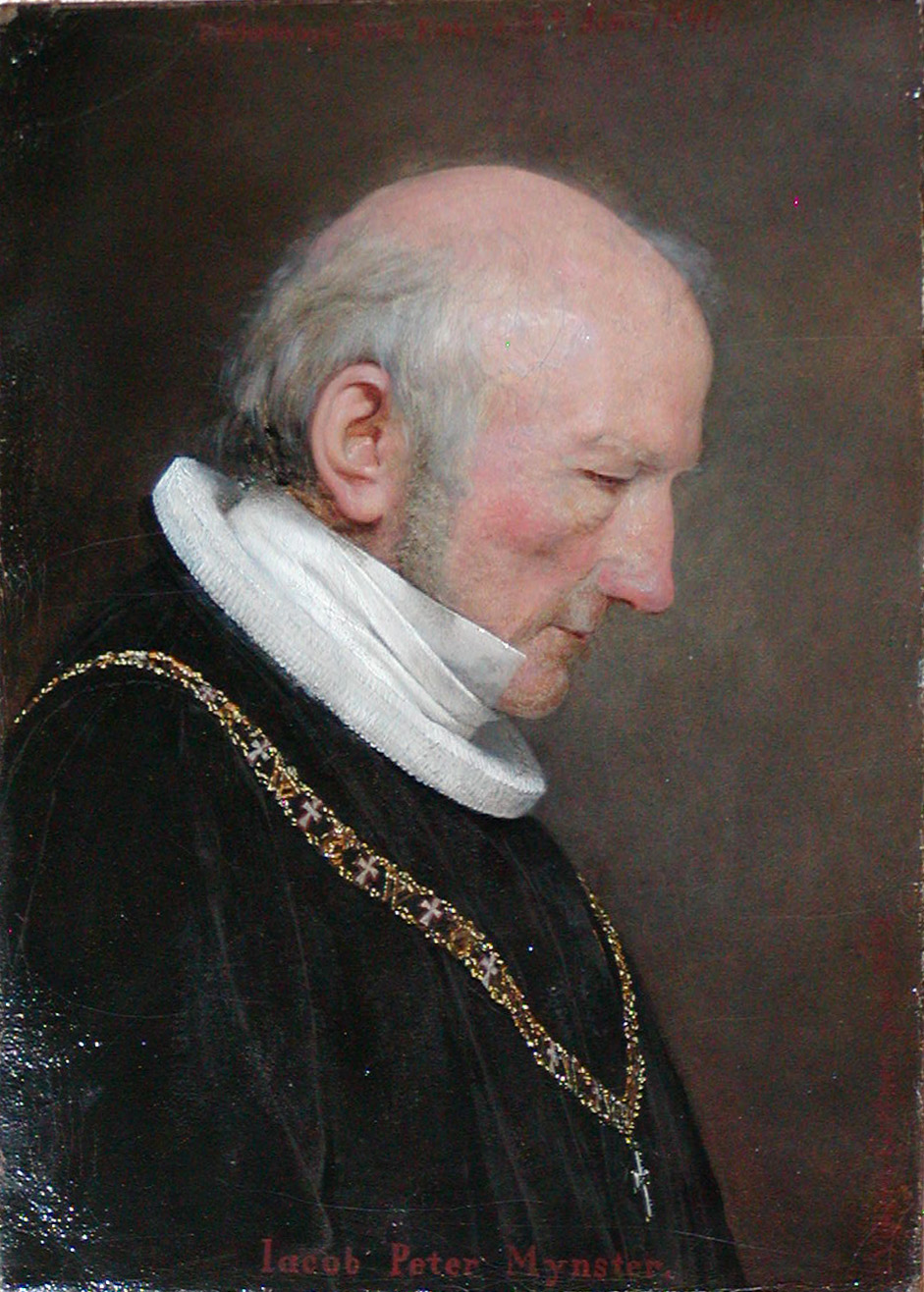
Jacob Peter Mynster,

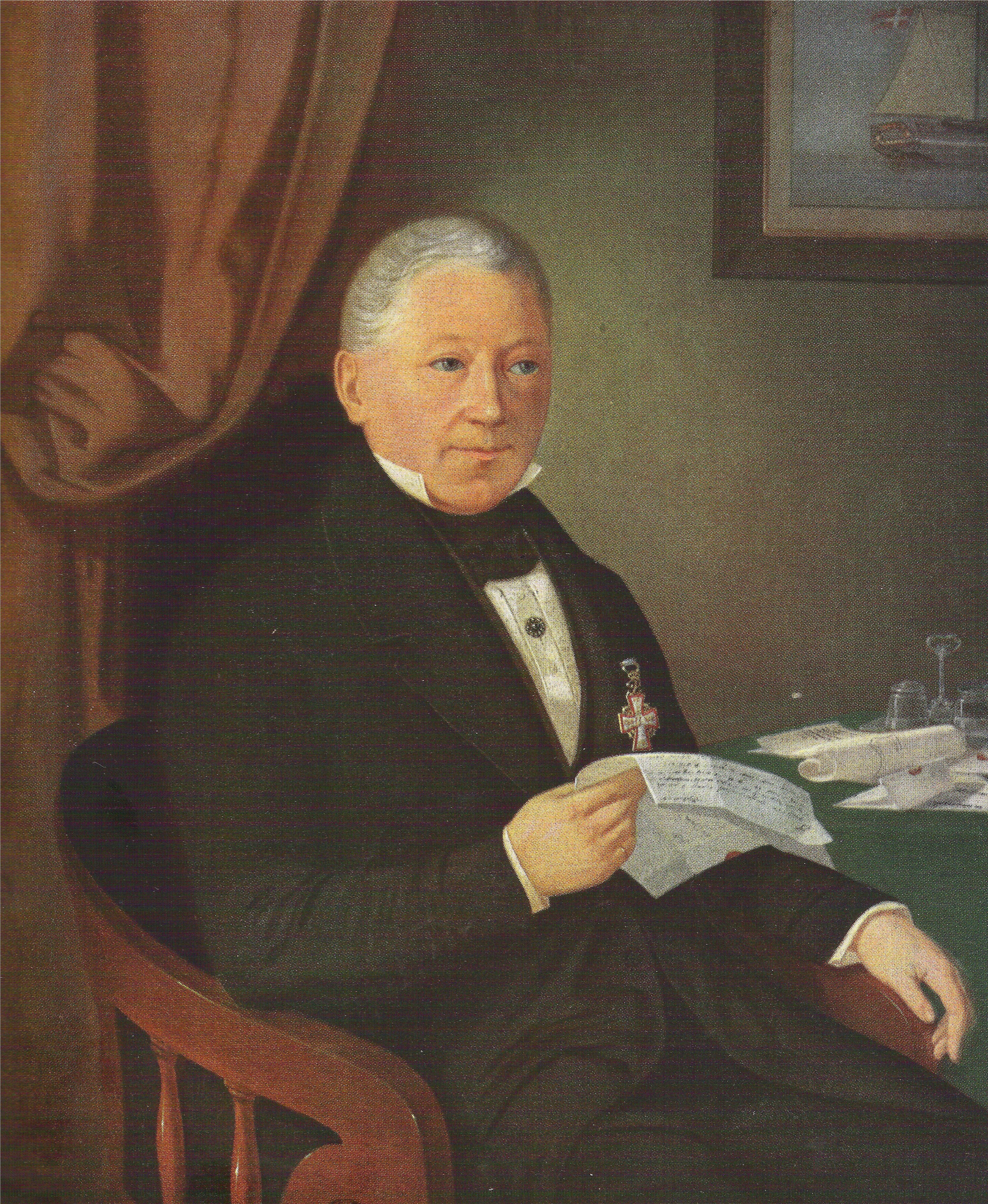
Jacob Holm.

=== January–March ===
- 30 January – Jacob Peter Mynster, theologian and bishop (born 1775)
- 23 March – Johannes Søbøtker, merchant, plantation owner and governor (born 1777)

=== July–September ===
- 9 July – Marie Toft, landowner (born 1813)
- 3 August – Jacob Holm, businessman (born 1770)

=== October–December ===
- 29 November – Poul Sporon, lawyer, (born 1795)
- 20 December – Gebhard Moltke, civil servant (born 1764)
