= 1930 in Denmark =

- Decades: 1910s; 1920s; 1930s; 1940s; 1950s
- See also: Other events of 1930; List of years in Denmark

Events from the year 1930 in Denmark.

== Incumbents ==
- Monarch – Christian X
- Prime minister – Thorvald Stauning

== Events ==
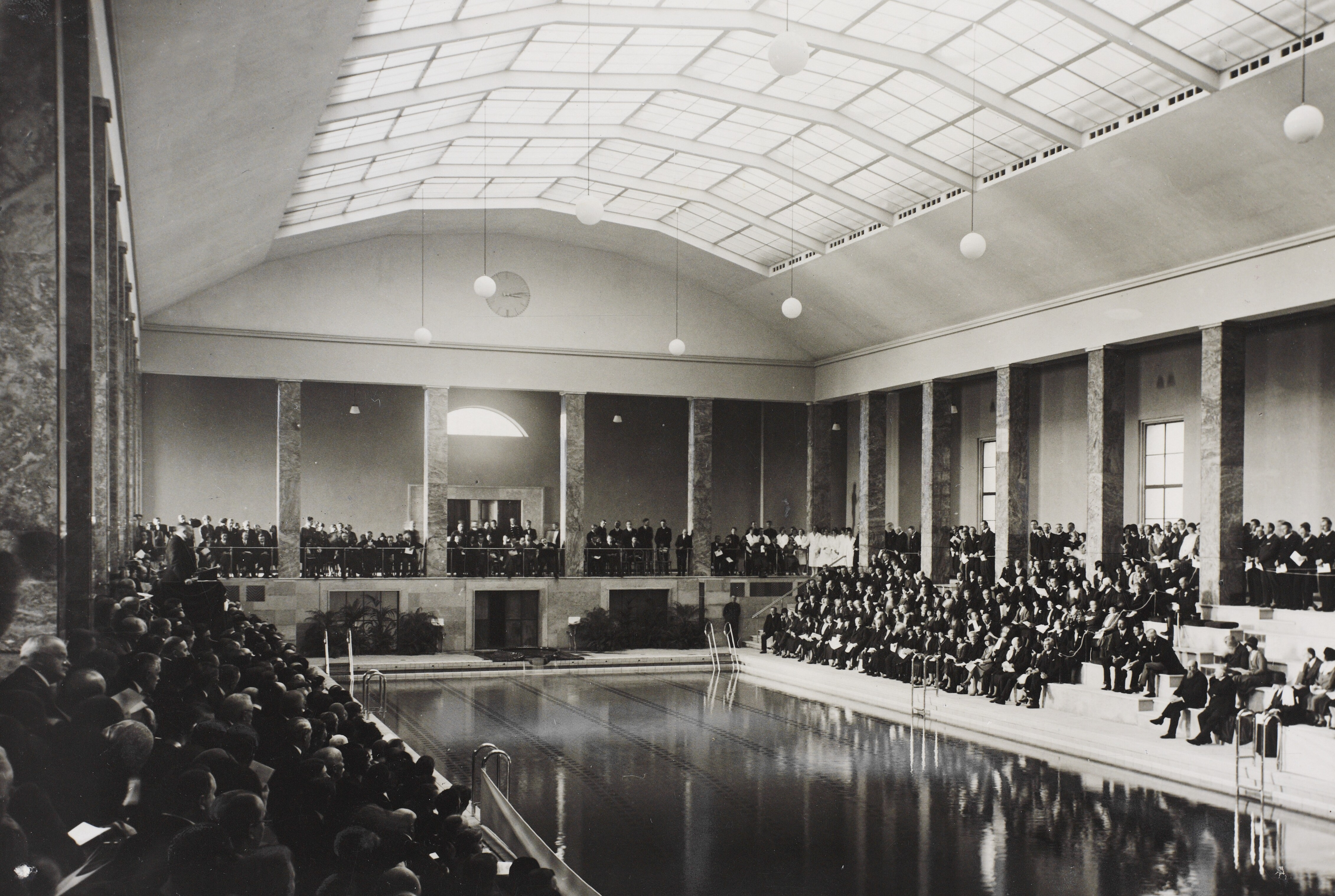
The Øbro-Hallen is inaugurated in the presence of Christioan X and Crown Prince Frederik.

=== Date unknown ===
- Øbro-allen is inaugurated in Copenhagen.

== Sports ==
=== Date unknown ===
- B93 wins their fourth Danish football championship by winning the 1929–30 Danish Championship League.

== Births ==
- 9 January – Kate Mundt, actress (died 2004)
- 30 March – Preben Kaas, actor (died 1981)
- 17 September – Hardy Rafn, actor (died 1997)
- 4 November – John Hahn-Petersen, actor (died 2006)
- 19 November – Kurt Nielsen, tennis player (died 2011)

== Deaths ==
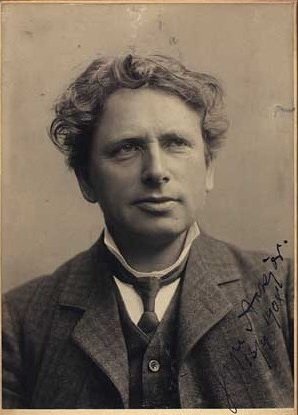
Jeppe Aakjær.

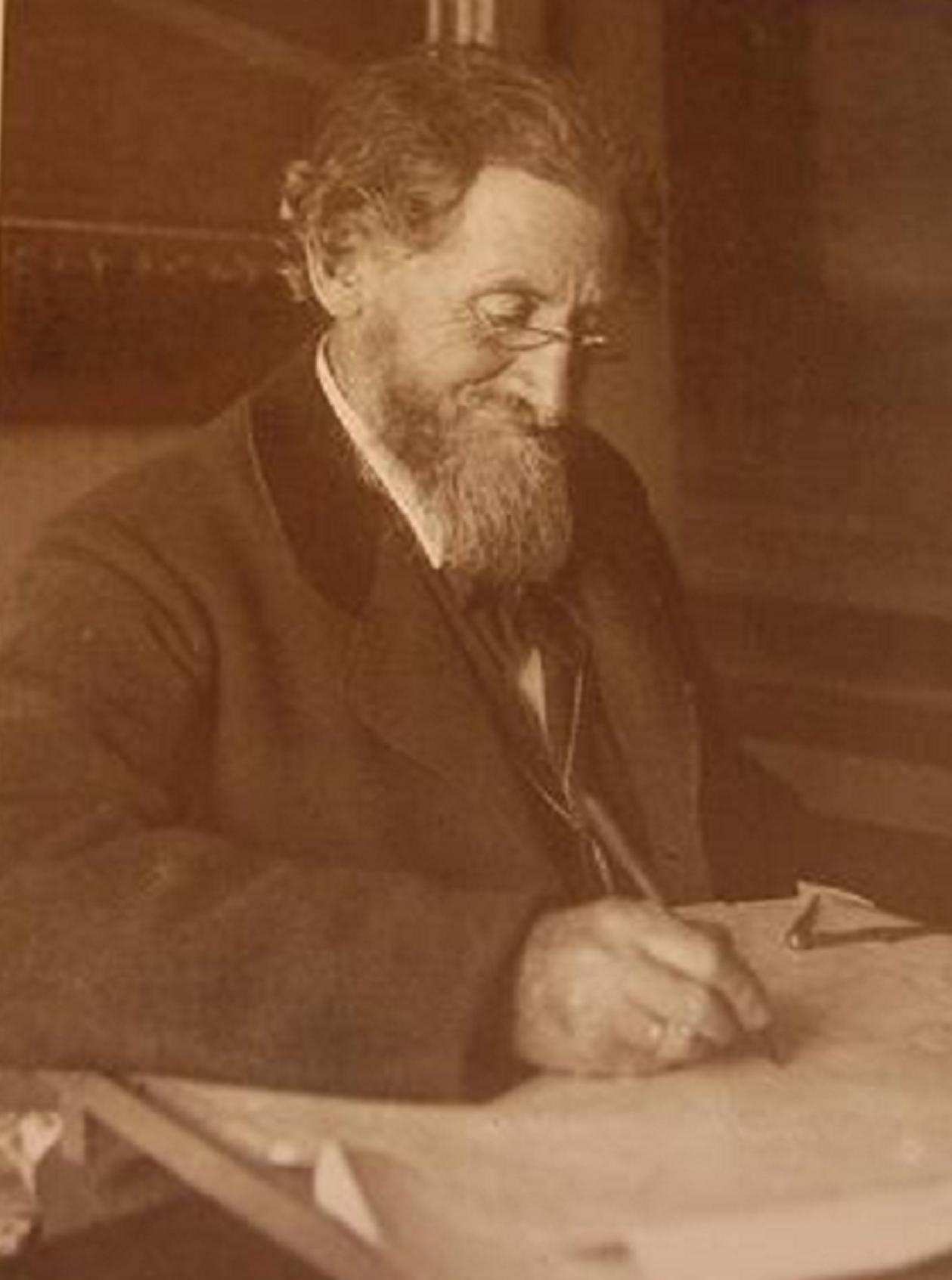
Peder Vilhelm Jensen-Klint.

=== January–March ===
- 24 February – Hans Ole Brasen, painter (born 1849)
- 28 February – Rasmus Andersen, sculptor (born 1861)

=== April–June ===
- 22 April – Jeppe Aakjær, writer (born 1866)
- 10 May – Christian Mølsted, painter (born 1862)
- 20 June – Kristian Erslev, historian (born 1852)

=== October–December ===
- 6 October – Hans Christian Viggo-Hansen, painter, sculptor and artisan metalsmith (born 1859)
- 2 November – Viggo Jensen, weightlifter, shooter, gymnast and athlete, Olympic gold medalist (Denmark's first) at the 1896 Summer Olympics (born 1874)
- 28 November – Erik Henningsen, painter (born 1855)
- 1 December – Peder Vilhelm Jensen-Klint, architect (born 1853)
- 19 December
  - Jens Christian Christensen, politician (born 1856)
  - Jens Christian Christensen, politician, prime minister of Denmark (born 1856)
- 19 December – Albert Edvard Wang, painter (born 1864)
- 21 December – Malthe Engelsted, painter (born 1852)
