= 1931 in Denmark =

- Decades: 1910s; 1920s; 1930s; 1940s; 1950s
- See also: Other events of 1931; List of years in Denmark

Events from the year 1931 in Denmark.

== Incumbents ==
- Monarch – Christian X
- Prime minister – Thorvald Stauning

== Events ==
- 31 August – Karen Blixen returns to Denmark after living 28 years in Kenya, settling at her native Rungstedlund.

== The arts ==
=== Music ===
- 14 August – Premiere performance of Carl Nielsen's Commotio, the composer's last major work, in Aarhus Cathedral.

== Sports ==
=== Cycling ===
- 21–30 August – The 1931 UCI Track Cycling World Championships are held in Copenhagen
  - Willy Hansen wins gold in men's sprint.
  - Helger Harder, Willy Gervin and Anker Meyer-Andersen win gold, silver and bronze in men's sprint at the Amateur event.
- 26 August – Henry Hansen wins gold in Amateur Road Race at the 1931 UCI Road World Championships.

=== Football ===
- Frem wins their second Danish football championship by winning the 1930–31 Danish Championship League.
- 4 August – Holbæk B&I is founded.

== Births ==
- 7 July – Palle Kjærulff-Schmidt, film director and screenwriter (died 2018)
- 15 December – Klaus Rifbjerg, writer (died 2015)

== Deaths ==
=== January–March ===
- 16 January – Carl Hansen Ostenfeld, botanist (born 1873)
- 18 February – Peter Elfelt, photographer (born 1866)

=== April–June ===
- 11 April– Sophus Claussen, writer (born 1754)
- 15 April – Knud V. Engelhardt, industrial designer (born 1882)
- 4 May – Christian Klengenberg, whaler, trapper and trader (born 1869)
  - 2 June – Harald Høffding, philosopher and theologian (born 1843)
- 7 June – Arnold Krog, designer (born 1856)
- 17 June – Holger F. Struer, chemist and company founder (born 1846)

=== July–September ===
- 8 August – Einar Hein, landscape painter associated with the "Skagen Painters" (born 1875)
- 30 August – Emilie Sannom, silent film actress and aerial acrobat (born 1886)
- 11 September – Maria Nielsen, historian and educator (born 1882)
- 16 September – Niels Nielsen , mathematician (born 1865
- 23 September – Asger Skovgaard Ostenfeld, engineer (born 1866)

=== October–December ===
- 3 October – Carl Nielsen, composer (born 1865)
- 20 December – Edvard Brandes, politician, author and editor (born 1847)
