= 1934 in Denmark =

- Decades: 1910s; 1920s; 1930s; 1940s; 1950s
- See also: Other events of 1934; List of years in Denmark

Events from the year 1934 in Denmark.

== Incumbents ==
- Monarch – Christian X
- Prime minister – Thorvald Stauning

== Events ==
- 15 January – The artist group Linien opens their first exhibition in Copenhagen, presenting 177 works of abstract-surrealist art.

== Sports ==
- 2 May – Ajax København is founded.

=== Cycling ===
- Willy Funda (GER) and Hans Pützfeld (GER) wins the first Six Days of Copenhagen six-day track cycling race.

=== Football ===
- B 93 wins their fifth Danish football championship by winning the 1933–34 Danish Championship League.

=== Swimming ===
- 12–19 August Denmark wins four bronze medal at the 1934 European Aquatics Championships.

== Births ==
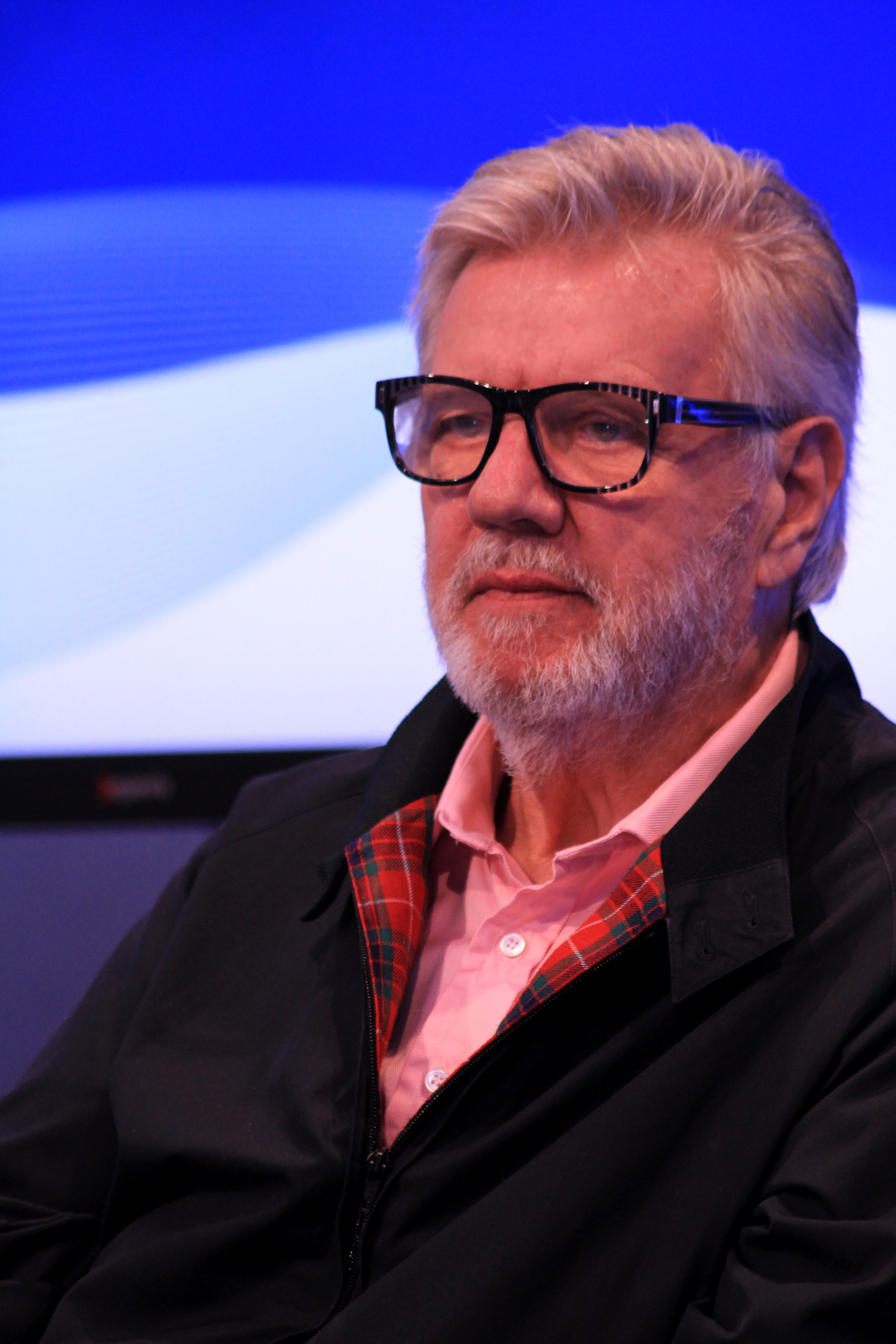
Morten Grunwald.

=== January–March ===
- 24 February – Flemming Nielsen, football player (died 2018)
- 14 March – Mogens Palle, boxing manager (died 2022)

=== April–June ===
- 25 May – Anne-Lise Salling Larsen, nurse and professor (died 2022)
- 24 March – Egil Robert Orskov, agronomist (died 2017 in Scotland)
- 11 June – Prince Henrik (died 2018)
- 29 June – Henning Kronstam, ballet dancer, ballet master, theatre director (died 1995)

=== October–December ===
- 15 October – Poul Borum, writer (died 1996)
- 9 December – Morten Grunwald, actor (died 2018)

== Deaths ==
=== January–March ===
- 22 January – Frida Schmidt, suffragist (born 1849)
- 1 February – Carl Gammeltoft, businessman (died 1855),
- 14 February – Frederik Jensen, stage and film actor (born 1863)
- 4 March – Matilde Bajer, women's rights activist and pacifist (born 1840)

=== July–September ===
- 9 July – Johanne Bindesbøll, textile artist (born 1834)
- 17 August – Georges Dreyer, pathologist, professor of pathology at the University of Oxford 1907–1934 (born 1863)
- 3 September – Carl Oluf Jensen, vetenarian (born 1864)
- 8 September – Hans Munch-Petersen, scholar (born 1869)
