= 1932 in Denmark =

- Decades: 1910s; 1920s; 1930s; 1940s; 1950s
- See also: Other events of 1932; List of years in Denmark

Events from the year 1932 in Denmark.

== Incumbents ==
- Monarch – Christian X
- Prime minister – Thorvald Stauning

== Events ==
- July and August – Denmark participates in the 1932 Summer Olympics and wins 6 medals
- 13 September – Danish Landsting election is held
- 16 November – Danish Folketing election is held in Denmark, but not in Faroe Islands
- 12 December – Danish Folketing election is held for the Faroe Islands
- 10 August – The Lego Group is founded

== Sports ==
=== Date unknown ===
- Kjøbenhavns Boldklub wins their seventh Danish football championship by winning the 1931–32 Danish Championship League.

== Births ==
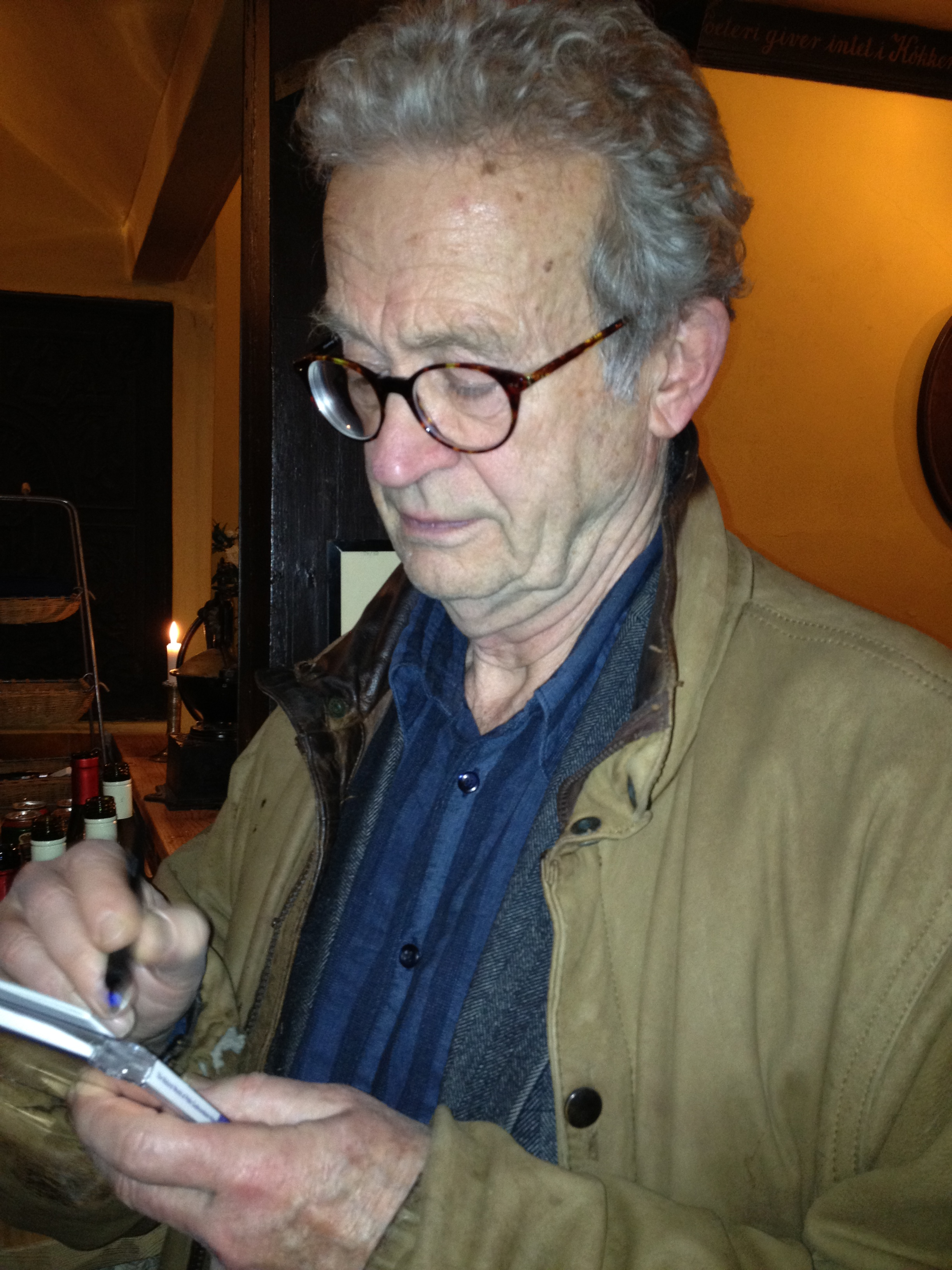
Pelle Gudmundsen-Holmgreen

=== January–March ===
- 11 March – Bodil Kjær, architect and furniture designer

=== April–June ===
- 27 April – Arne Haugen Sørensen, artist

=== July–September ===
- 13 July – Per Nørgård, composer (died 2025)
- 15 July – Nina van Pallandt, actress
- 20 July – Ove Verner Hansen, actor (died 2016)
- 26 September – Knud Heinesen, politician (died 2025)

=== October–December ===
- 21 November – Pelle Gudmundsen-Holmgreen, composer (died 2016)

== Deaths ==
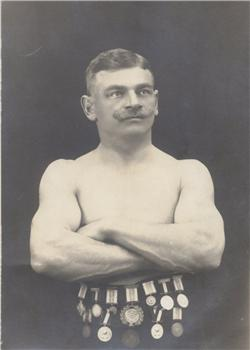
Magnus Bech-Olsen.

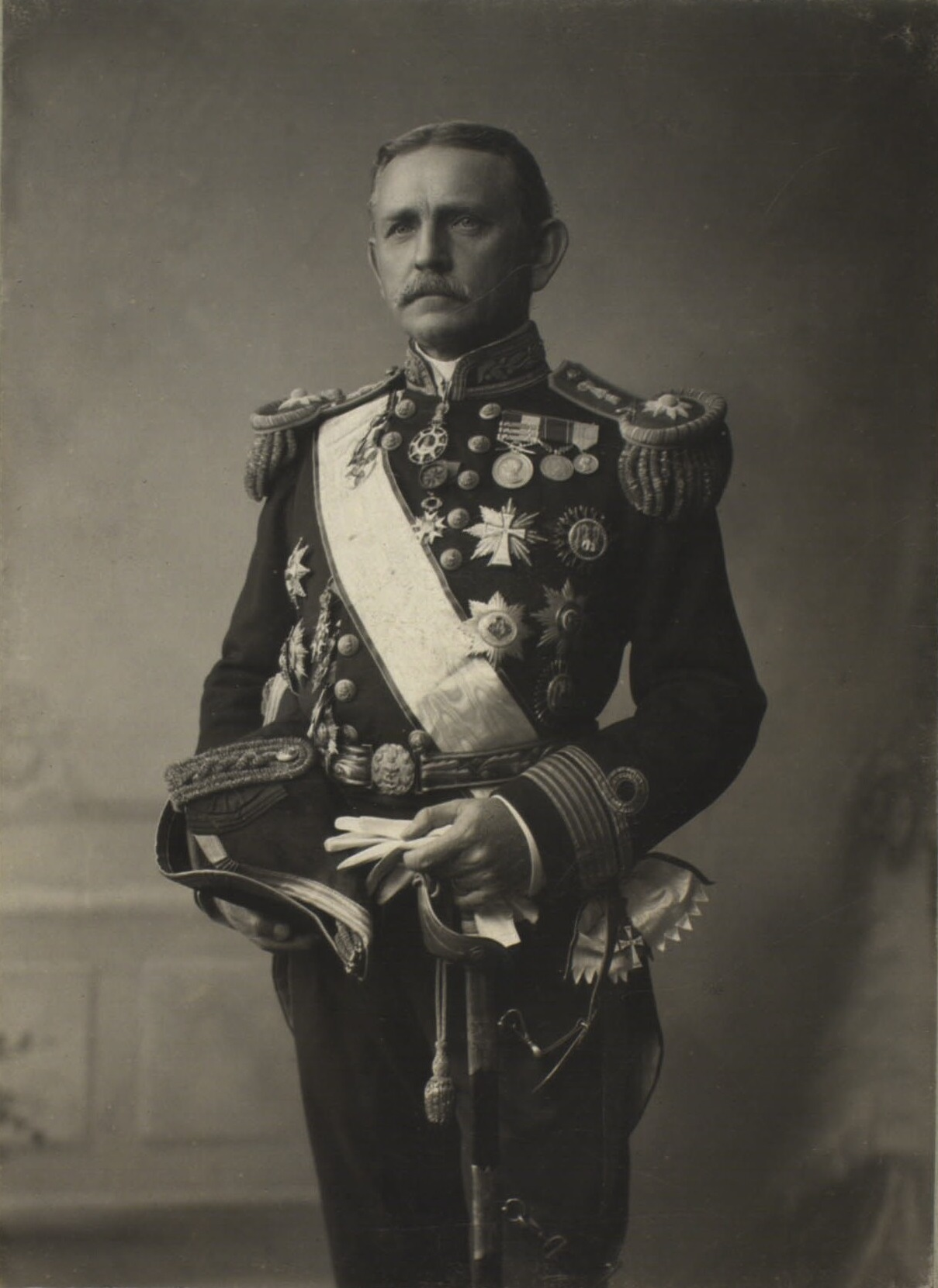
Andreas du Plessis de Richelieu.

=== January–March ===
- 19 February – Magnus Bech-Olsen, wrestler and circus manager (born 1866)
- 25 March – Andreas du Plessis de Richelieu, businessman (died 1852)

=== April–June ===
- 18 May – Christian Hedemann, photographer (born 1852)
- 14 June – Peter Adler Alberti, politician and swindler, known for the Alberti scandal of 1908 (born 1851)
- 28 June – Urania Marquard Olsen, actress and theatre director (born 1856)

=== October–December ===
- 31 October – Maria Mogensen, curator and egyptologist (born 1882)
- 17 December – Charles Winckler, shot putter (born 1867)
