= 1933 in Denmark =

- Decades: 1910s; 1920s; 1930s; 1940s; 1950s
- See also: Other events of 1933; List of years in Denmark

Events from the year 1933 in Denmark.

== Incumbents ==
- Monarch – Christian X
- Prime minister – Thorvald Stauning

== Events ==
- January: Kanslergade Agreement

== Sports ==
- 22 April ASA Fodbold is founded.
- 4 May – Kastrup Boldklub is founded.

=== Date unknown ===
- Frem win their fourth Danish football championship by winning the 1932–33 Danish Championship League.

== Births ==
- 23 January – Hanne Vedel, designer
- 1 August – Ebbe Langberg, actor (died 1989)
- 17 August – Bonna Søndberg, Operatic soprano

== Deaths ==
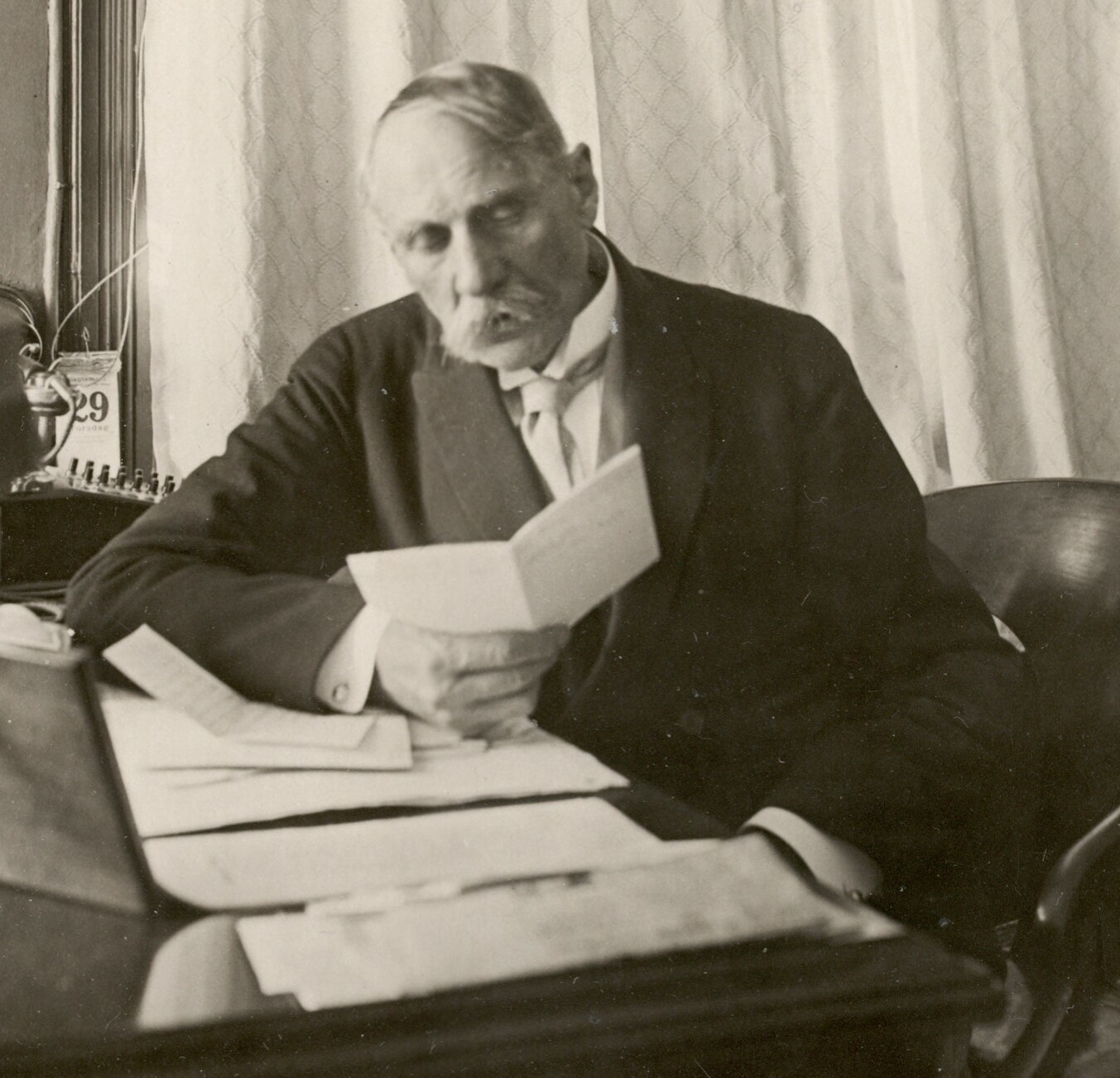
Henrik Cavling.

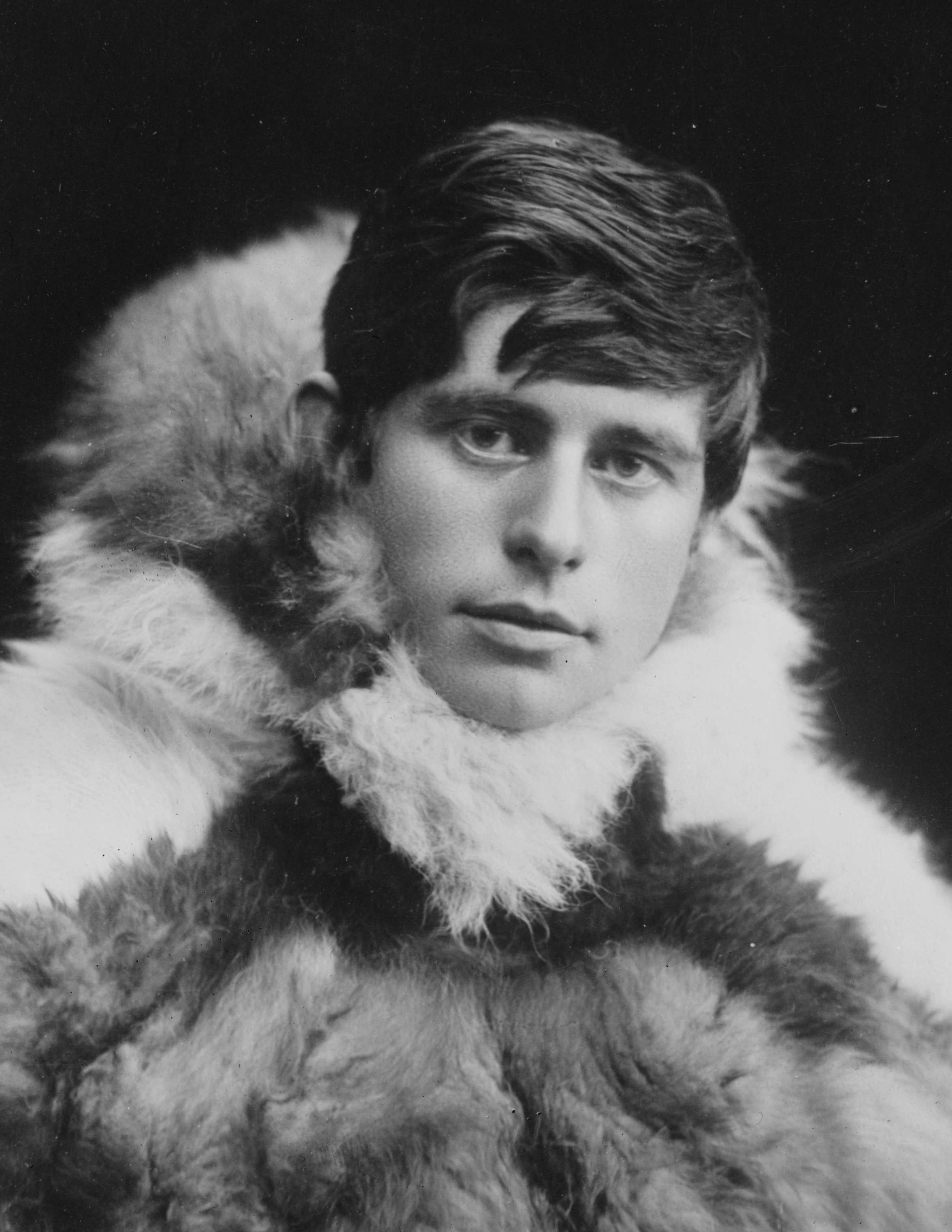
Knud Rasmussen.

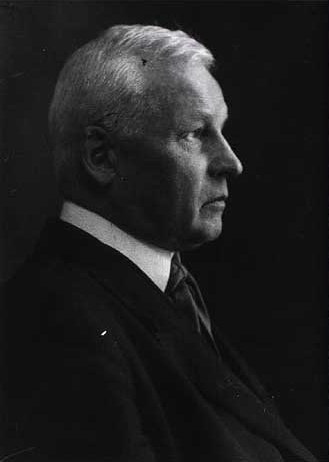
Ulrik Plesner.

=== January–March ===
- 7 January – Gad Frederik Clement, painter (born 1867)
- 11 January – Frederik Riise, photographer (born 1863)
- 13 February – Jacob Stilling-Andersen, businessman (born 1858)
- 20 February – Ludvig Sylow (DBU)m football executive (born 1861)
- 9 March – Joakim Skovgaard, artist (born 1856)

=== April–June ===
- 16 April – Peter Ilsted, painter (born 1861)
- 23 May – Karl Jensen, painter (born 1851)

=== July–September ===
- 7 August – Henrik Cavling, journalist (born 1858)
- 10 September – L. A. Ring, painter (born 1854)

=== October–December ===
- 30 October – Svend Kornbeck, stage and film actor (born 1869)
- 14 November – Poul Simon Christiansen, painter and church decorator (born 1855)
- 22 November
    - Ulrik Plesner, architect (born 1861)
  - Christian Bayer, illustrator (born 1841)
- 11 December – Michael Agerskov, spiritualist teacher and author (born 1870)
- 13 December – Carl Johan Bonnesen, sculptor (born 1868)
- 21 December – Knud Rasmussen, arctic explorer, anthropologist (born 1879)
