= 1856 in Denmark =

- Decades: 1830s; 1840s; 1850s; 1860s; 1870s
- See also: Other events of 1856; List of years in Denmark

Events from the year 1856 in Denmark.

== Incumbents ==
- Monarch – Frederick VII
- Prime minister – Peter Georg Bang (18 October), Carl Christoffer Georg Andræ

== Events ==
- 16 April – Jacob Heinrich Moresco opens a shop with women's clothing and fashion accessories at Amagertorv 13 in Copenhagen.
- 27 April – The Roskuilde–Korsør extension of the Copenhagen–Roskilde Railway is inaugurated.
- 13 July – C. K. Hansen is founded.
- 24 July – HDMS Heimdal is launched at Nyholm in Copenhagen.
- 17 October – The Bang cabinet steos down.

=== Undated ===
- Seamen's Association of 1856 is founded.
- The Ceres Brewery is founded by Malthe Conrad Lottrup in Aarhus.

== Births ==
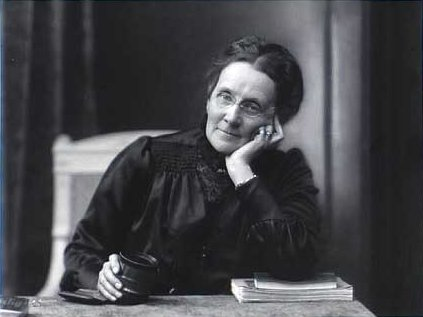
Julie Laurberg.

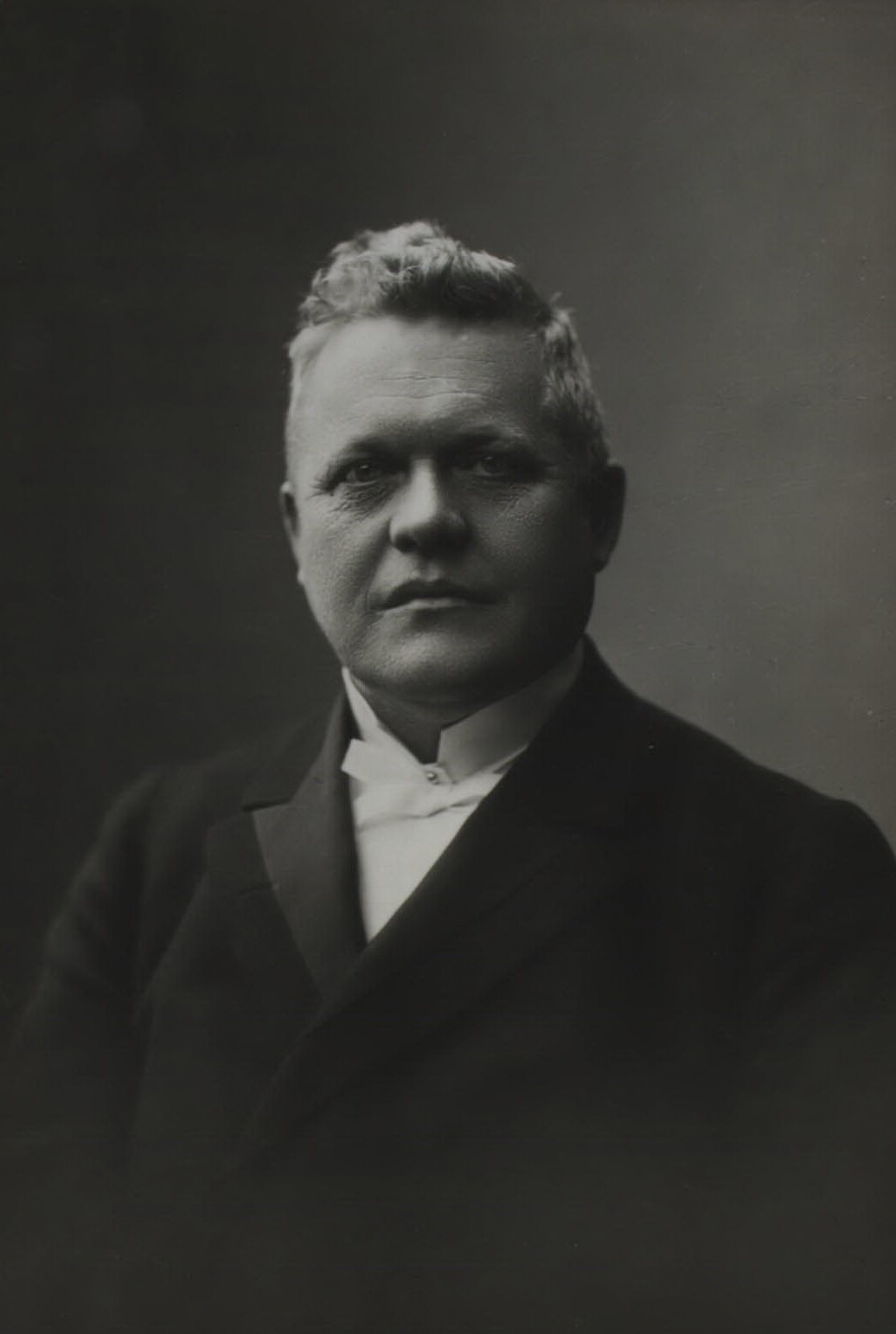
Jens Christian Christensen.

=== January–June ===
- 18 March – Arnold Krog, designer (died 1931)
- 5 August – Axel Berg, architect (died 1929)
- 13 April – Urania Marquard Olsen, actress and theatre director (died 1932)

=== July–December ===
- 6 September – Hack Kampmann, architect (died 1920)
- 7 September – Julie Laurberg, photographer (died 1925)
- 28 October – Mary Steen, photographer (died 1939)
- 18 November – Joakim Skovgaard, artist (died 1933)
- 21 November – Jens Christian Christensen, politician (died 1839)

== Deaths ==
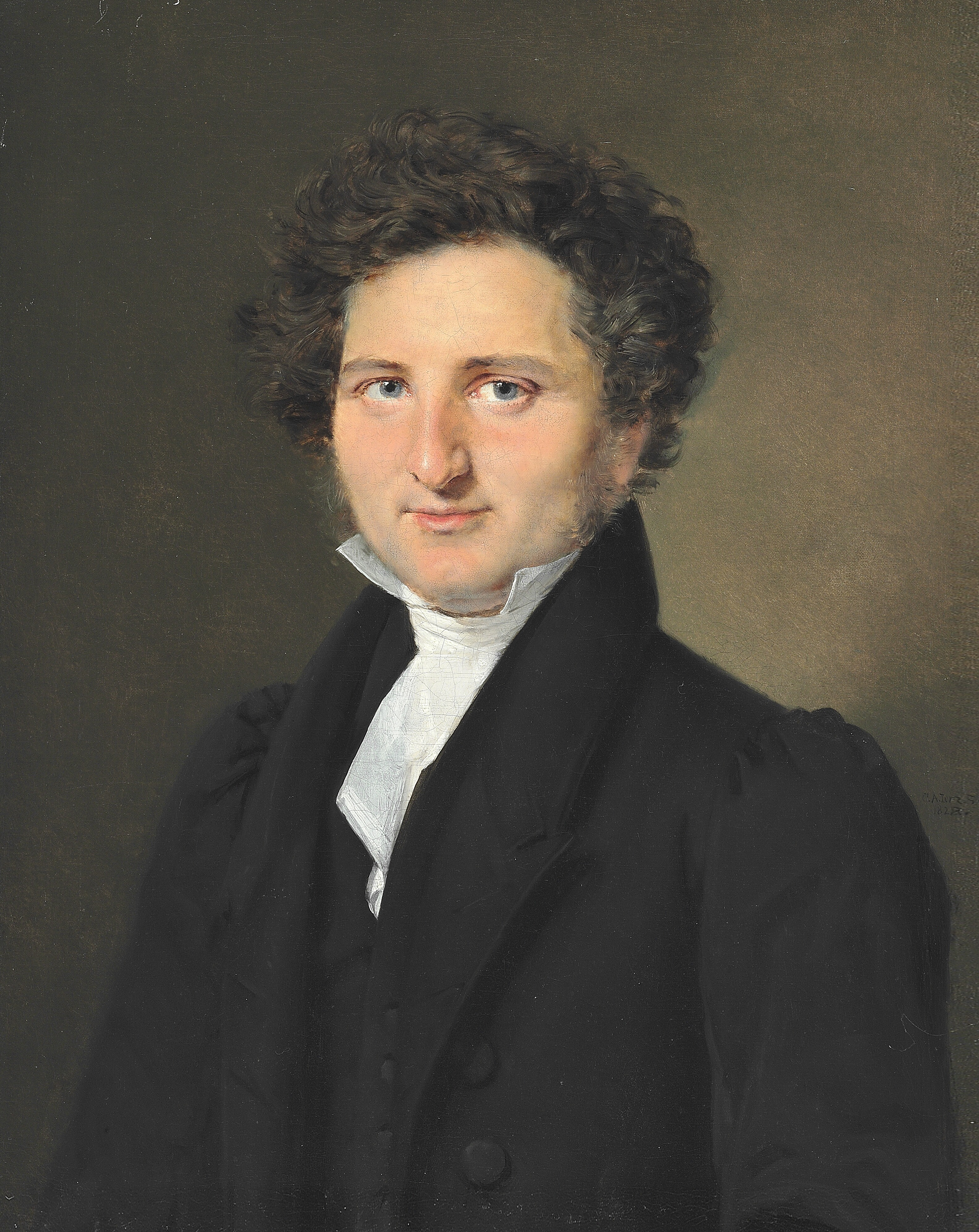
Johan Laurentz Jensen.

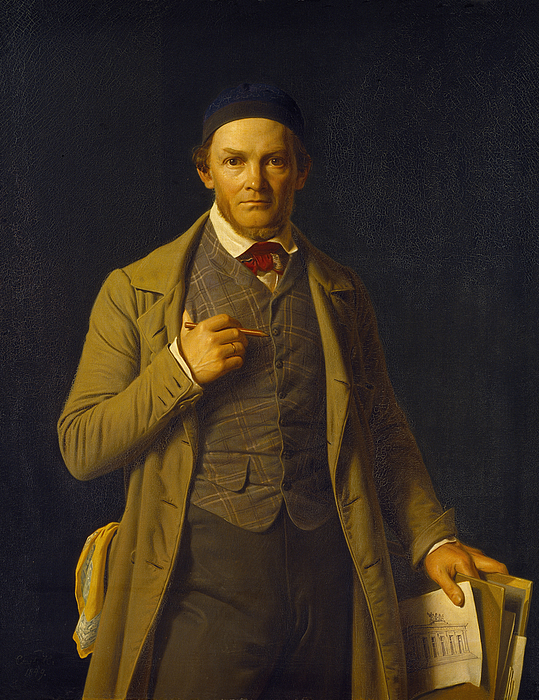
Gottlieb Bindesbøll.

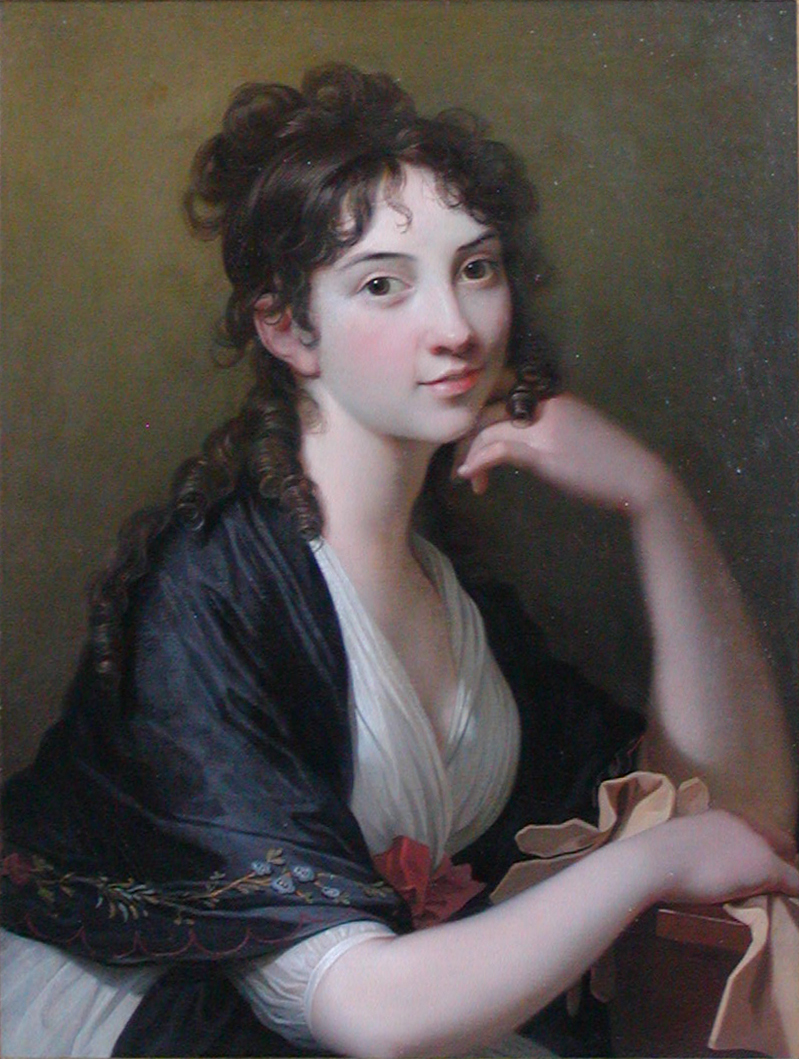
Thomasine Gyllembourg-

=== January–March ===
- 8 January – Frederik Marcus Knuth, landowner, civil servant and politician (born 1813)
- 26 March – Johan Laurentz Jensen, painter (born 1800)

=== April–June ===
- 13 May – Mads Johansen Lange, businessman (born 1807)

=== July–September ===
- 2 July – Thomasine Christine Gyllembourg-Ehrensvärd, author (born 1773)
- 14 July – Michael Gottlieb Bindesbøll, architect (born 1800)
- 20 July – Anna Nielsen, mezzo-soprano (born 1803)
- 21 July – Emil Aarestrup, poet (born 1800)
- 26 July – Otto Didrik Schack, 7th Count of Schackenborg, count (born 1810)
- 15 September – Severin Løvenskiold, baron (born 1777)

=== October–December ===
- 29 October – Frederik Liebmann, botanist (born 1813)
- 25 November – Simon Aron Eiberchutz, businessman and philanthropist (born 1786)
