= 1929 in Denmark =

- Decades: 1900s; 1910s; 1920s; 1930s; 1940s
- See also: Other events of 1929; List of years in Denmark

Events from the year 1929 in Denmark.

== Incumbents ==
- Monarch – Christian X
- Prime minister – Thomas Madsen-Mygdal (until 30 April), Thorvald Stauning

== Events ==
- 26–31 August – The 18th Scandinavian Scientist Conference is held in Copenhagen.

== Sports ==
- 14 May – KFUM Roskilde is founded.

=== Date unknown ===
- B 93 wins their third Danish football championship at the 1928–29 Danmarksmesterskabsturneringen.

== Births ==
=== January–March ===
- 8 January – Poul Kjærholm, furniture designer (died 1980)
- 13 January – Villy Sørensen, philosopher and writer (died 2001)
- 27 March – Cecil Bødker, author (died 2020)

=== April–June ===
- 3 April – Poul Schlüter, politician (died 2021)
- 16 May – Holger Hansen, politician (died 2015)
- 28 May – Bent Christensen, film director (died 1992)
- 25 June – Benny Schmidt, modern pentathlete

=== Kily–September ===
- 11 July – Anne Wolden-Ræthinge, journalist (died 2016)

=== October–December ===
- 7 November – Benny Andersen, poet (died 2018)

== Deaths ==
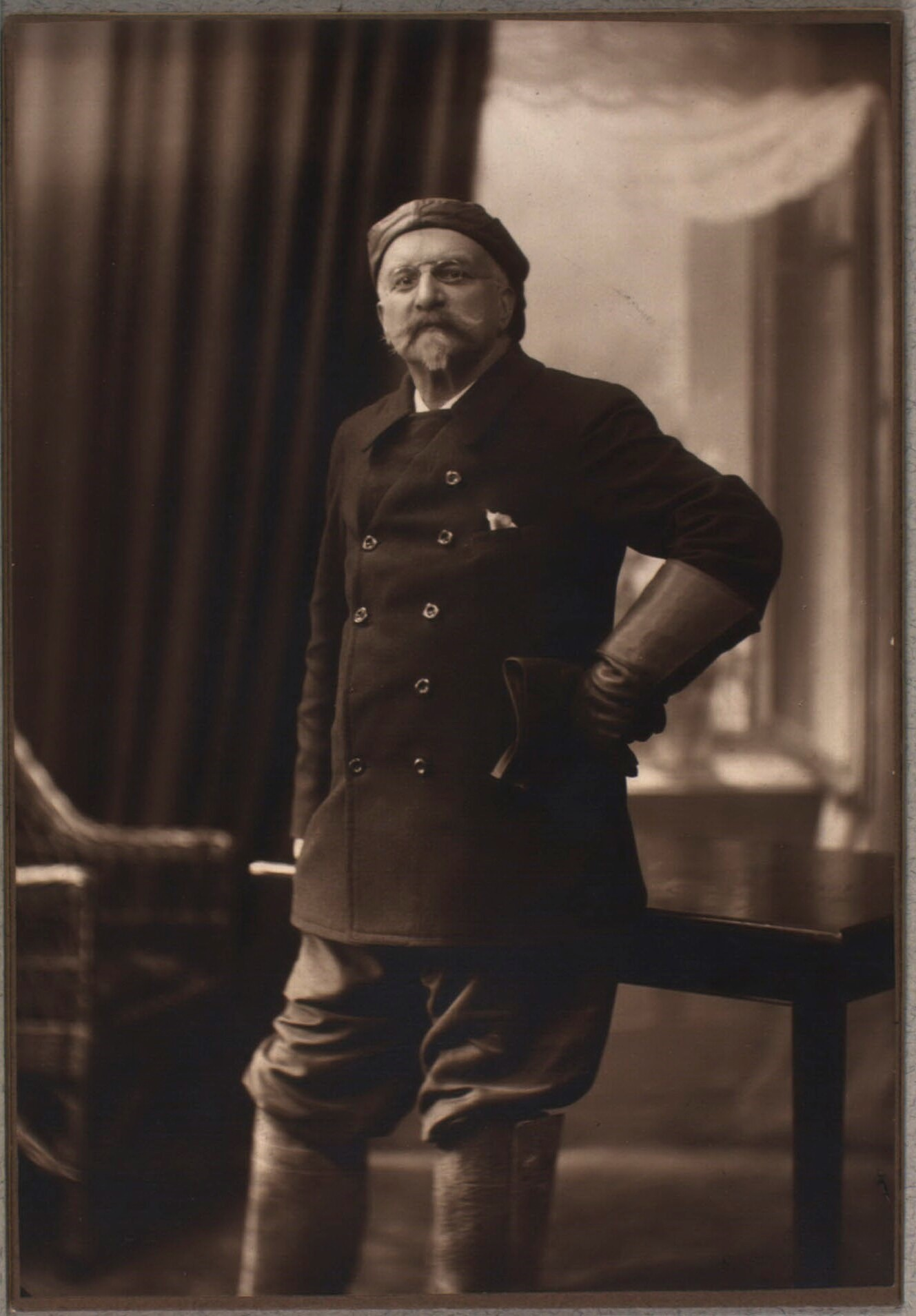
Hans Kaarsberg.

=== January–March ===
- 3 February – Agner Krarup Erlang, mathematician (born 1878)
- 4 March – Peter Kristian Prytz, physicist (born 1851)
- 16 March – Hans Kaarsberg, medical doctor, writer and adventurer (born 1854)
- 18 March – Karl Hansen Reistrup, sculptor, illustrator and ceramist. (born 1863)
- 21 March – Otto Liebe, prime minister (born 1860)

=== April–June ===
- 8 April – Evald Tang Kristensen, author and folklore collector (born 1843)

=== October–December ===
- 19 October – Aksel Mikkelsen, educator (born 1849)
- 28 December – Kristian Hude, photographer (born 1864)
- 10 December – Axel Berg, architect (born 1856)
