= 1936–37 Danish Championship League =

Danish Championship League
- Season: 1936–37
- Champions: Akademisk Boldklub

Following are the statistics of the Danish Championship League in the 1936–37 season.

== Overview ==
It was contested by 10 teams, and Akademisk Boldklub won the championship.

== League standings ==
Pos	Team	Pld	W	D	L	GF	GA	GD	Pts
1	Akademisk Boldklub	18	12	4	2	61	25	+36	28
2	Boldklubben Frem	18	11	4	3	49	24	+25	26
3	Boldklubben af 1893	18	11	3	4	42	29	+13	25
4	Kjøbenhavns Boldklub	18	11	2	5	53	29	+24	24
5	Boldklubben 1903	18	10	3	5	55	26	+29	23
6	Aalborg Boldspilklub	18	7	2	9	28	45	−17	16
7	Aarhus Gymnastikforening	18	5	2	11	28	41	−13	12
8	Esbjerg fB	18	4	3	11	26	46	−20	11
9	Hellerup IK	18	4	2	12	27	49	−22	10
10	Helsingør IF	18	2	1	15	22	77	−55	5
