= Den Borgerlige Velgørenheds Stiftelse =

Historic building in Vordingborg Municipality, Denmark

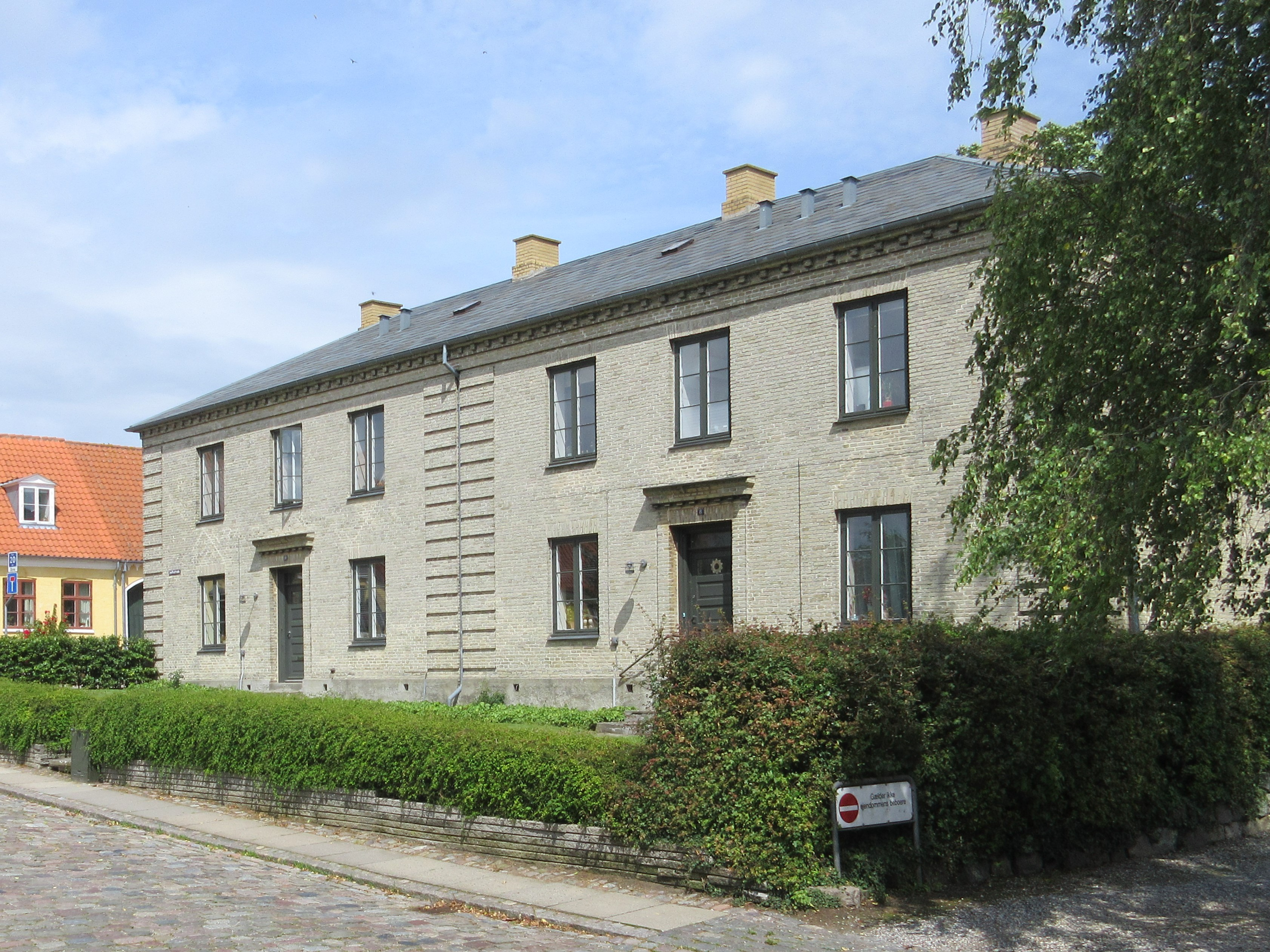
- Interactive map of the Den Borgerlige Velgørenheds Stiftelse area

General information
- Location: Præstø, Denmark
- Coordinates: 55°7′25.97″N 12°2′45.64″E
- Completed: 1869

Den Borgerlige Velgørenheds Stiftelse (lit. "The Hoise of Civic Charity") is a historic building in Præstø, Vordingborg Municipality, Denmark. Built in 1869 to provide accommodation for elderly widows of the middle class, it was listed on the Danish registry of protected buildings and places by the Danish Heritage Agency on 8 January 1982.

== History ==
Den Borgerlige Velgørenhedsselskab (The Society of Civic Charity) was founded in Præstø on 7 May 1852 with the aim of providing homes and economic support for elderly, respectable widows of the middle class. The site was donated for the project by the town of Præstø and the building was completed in 1869. The building contained eight small apartments. Residents had to be at least 50 years old widows and it was also a requirement that either they or their husband had been members of the society and paid made at least the smallest required annual contribution. In 1899, each resident received an annual sum of DKK 50 as well as a portion of firewood. The society sold the building to Præstø Municipality in the mid-1980s. It changed hands again in 2009 and was subsequently refurbished.

== Today ==
The building now contains six apartments.
