= Sparekassen for Vordingborg og Omegn =

Defunct Danish bank

- Company type: Savings bank
- Industry: Financial services
- Founded: January 8, 1855
- Fate: Unknown
- Successor: Unknown
- Headquarters: Vordingborg, Denmark
- Key people: Aksel Jensen (Bank manager)
- Products: Savings accounts, mortgages

Sparekassen for Vordingborg og Omegn was a Danish savings bank based in Vordingborg, Denmark.

== History ==
The bank was founded on 8 January 1855. Aksel Jensen (born 1907) served as bank manager from 1949.
