= 1929–30 Danish Championship League =

Danish Championship League
- Season: 1929–30
- Champions: Boldklubben af 1893

Following are the statistics of the Danish Championship League in the 1929–30 season.

== Overview ==
It was contested by 10 teams, and Boldklubben af 1893 won the championship.

== League standings ==
Pos	Team	Pld	W	D	L	GF	GA	GD	Pts
1	Boldklubben af 1893	9	8	1	0	37	8	+29	17
2	Boldklubben Frem	9	6	3	0	39	8	+31	15
3	Boldklubben 1903	9	7	0	2	27	11	+16	14
4	Kjøbenhavns Boldklub	9	4	2	3	22	10	+12	10
5	Akademisk Boldklub	9	4	1	4	30	21	+9	9
6	Horsens fS	9	3	1	5	19	23	−4	7
7	Aalborg Boldspilklub	9	2	2	5	19	34	−15	6
8	B 1901	9	3	0	6	15	46	−31	6
9	Odense Boldklub	9	1	2	6	17	33	−16	4
10	Korsør Boldklub	9	0	2	7	14	45	−31	2
