= Aino Kann Rasmussen =

Danish archaeologist and curator

- Born: 14 December 1937 (age 88)
- Education: Aarhus University
- Occupations: Archaeologist; Curator

Aino Kann Rasmussen (born 14 December 1937, Hellerup) is a Danish archaeologist, curator and former chair of the Velux Foundation.

== Biography ==
Rasmussen studied archaeology under Peter Glob at Aarhus University, where she participated in the Danish archaeological expedition to Bahrain. After obtaining her master's degree, she became an inspector first at the National Museum of Denmark and later Esbjerg Museum in Jutland. In 1986, she left the museum sector to work at the fine art auction house Bruun Rasmussen Kunstauktioner.

Rasmussen's father was Villum Kann Rasmussen, the founder of Velux and other Danish window manufacturing companies. She served as the director and chair of the board of the Velux Foundation, the nonprofit foundation established by her father, from 1981 until 2007. She also wrote a biography of her father, Ét forsøg er bedre end tusind ekspertantagelser: V. Kann Rasmussen & Co (1991).

She was appointed a Knight (Ridder) of the Order of the Dannebrog in 2002.

== Publications ==
- Bramming station 1874-1974, 1974
- One experiment is better than a thousand expert views : 1941-1951 : V. Kann Rasmussen & Co., 1991
