= 1931–32 Danish Championship League =

Danish Championship League
- Season: 1931–32
- Champions: Kjøbenhavns Boldklub

Following are the statistics of the Danish Championship League in the 1931–32 season.

== Overview ==
It was contested by 10 teams, and Kjøbenhavns Boldklub won the championship.

== League standings ==
Pos	Team	Pld	W	D	L	GF	GA	GD	Pts
1	Kjøbenhavns Boldklub	9	9	0	0	30	7	+23	18
2	Akademisk Boldklub	9	7	1	1	36	14	+22	15
3	Boldklubben af 1893	9	6	0	3	40	15	+25	12
4	Boldklubben 1903	9	6	0	3	33	18	+15	12
5	Boldklubben Frem	9	4	2	3	31	20	+11	10
6	Aalborg Boldspilklub	9	3	2	4	28	34	−6	8
7	Aarhus Gymnastikforening	9	2	1	6	18	31	−13	5
8	Odense Boldklub	9	2	0	7	18	38	−20	4
9	Fremad Amager	9	1	1	7	16	35	−19	3
10	Horsens fS	9	1	1	7	11	49	−38	3
