= 1932–33 Danish Championship League =

Danish Championship League
- Season: 1932–33
- Champions: Boldklubben Frem

Following are the statistics of the Danish Championship League in the 1932–33 season.

== Overview ==
It was contested by 10 teams, and Boldklubben Frem won the championship.

== League standings ==
Pos	Team	Pld	W	D	L	GF	GA	GD	Pts
1	Boldklubben Frem	9	8	0	1	27	8	+19	16
2	Boldklubben 1903	9	7	0	2	37	19	+18	14
3	Aarhus Gymnastikforening	9	5	2	2	20	10	+10	12
4	Kjøbenhavns Boldklub	9	5	1	3	22	15	+7	11
5	Aalborg Boldspilklub	9	4	2	3	28	15	+13	10
6	Akademisk Boldklub	9	4	1	4	28	28	0	9
7	Esbjerg fB	9	3	2	4	16	20	−4	8
8	Boldklubben af 1893	9	2	2	5	19	27	−8	6
9	Fremad Amager	9	2	0	7	12	30	−18	4
10	Odense Boldklub	9	0	0	9	5	42	−37	0
