= 1930–31 Danish Championship League =

Danish Championship League
- Season: 1930–31
- Champions: Boldklubben Frem

Following are the statistics of the Danish Championship League in the 1930–31 season.

== Overview ==
It was contested by 10 teams, and Boldklubben Frem won the championship.

== League standings ==
Pos	Team	Pld	W	D	L	GF	GA	GD	Pts
1	Boldklubben Frem	9	8	1	0	38	11	+27	17
2	Kjøbenhavns Boldklub	9	6	1	2	31	13	+18	13
3	Boldklubben af 1893	9	5	2	2	31	13	+18	12
4	Akademisk Boldklub	9	6	0	3	41	25	+16	12
5	Aarhus Gymnastikforening	9	4	2	3	33	18	+15	10
6	Boldklubben 1903	9	5	0	4	28	30	−2	10
7	Aalborg Boldspilklub	9	3	0	6	26	46	−20	6
8	Odense Boldklub	9	3	0	6	17	41	−24	6
9	Horsens fS	9	1	1	7	16	40	−24	3
10	B 1901	9	0	1	8	13	37	−24	1
