= 1933–34 Danish Championship League =

Danish Championship League
- Season: 1933–34
- Champions: Boldklubben af 1893

Following are the statistics of the Danish Championship League in the 1933–34 season.

== Overview ==
It was contested by 10 teams, and Boldklubben af 1893 won the championship.

== League standings ==
| Pos | Team | Pld | W | D | L | GF | GA | GD | Pts |
|---|---|---|---|---|---|---|---|---|---|
| 1 | Boldklubben af 1893 | 9 | 7 | 0 | 2 | 34 | 14 | +20 | 14 |
| 2 | Boldklubben 1903 | 9 | 7 | 0 | 2 | 34 | 20 | +14 | 14 |
| 3 | Boldklubben Frem | 9 | 6 | 1 | 2 | 26 | 15 | +11 | 13 |
| 4 | Kjøbenhavns Boldklub | 9 | 6 | 0 | 3 | 39 | 21 | +18 | 12 |
| 5 | Akademisk Boldklub | 9 | 4 | 1 | 4 | 29 | 23 | +6 | 9 |
| 6 | Aarhus Gymnastikforening | 9 | 4 | 0 | 5 | 24 | 24 | 0 | 8 |
| 7 | Esbjerg fB | 9 | 3 | 1 | 5 | 19 | 29 | −10 | 7 |
| 8 | Aalborg Boldspilklub | 9 | 3 | 0 | 6 | 24 | 39 | −15 | 6 |
| 9 | Fremad Amager | 9 | 2 | 1 | 6 | 13 | 29 | −16 | 5 |
| 10 | Skovshoved IF | 9 | 1 | 0 | 8 | 17 | 45 | −28 | 2 |
