= Poul Elias Windtmil Schlegel =

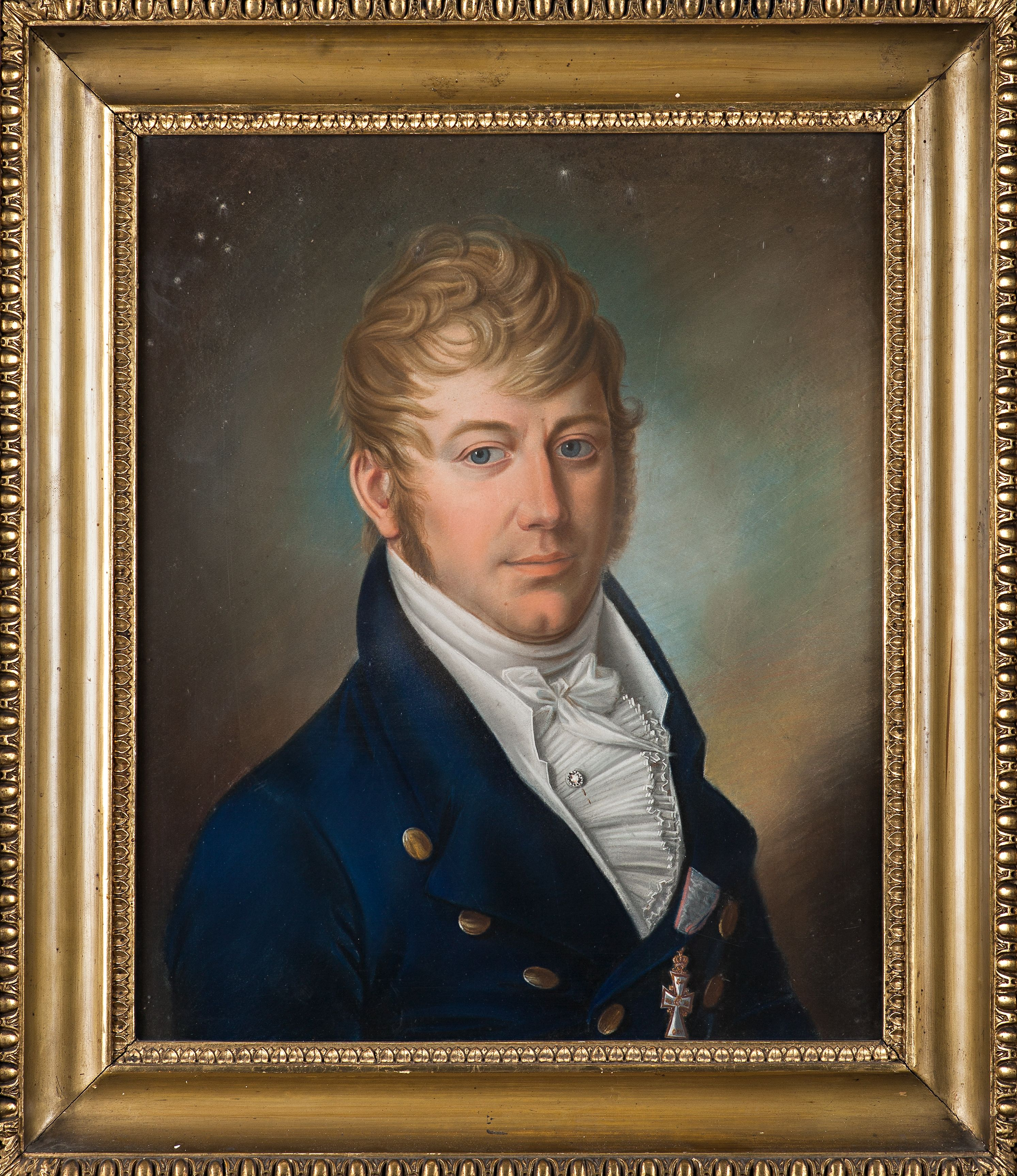
Portrait of Poul Elias Schlegel by unknown artist

Poul Elias Windtmil Schlegel (6 August 1784 – 2 December 1849) was a Danish military surgeon and medical doctor. He performed the first caesarean delivery in Denmark. He resided on Saint Croix in the Danish West Indies from 1814 until 1845, first as garrison surgeon and then as district physician.

== Early age and education ==
Schlegel was born on 6 August 1784 in Copenhagen, the son of justitsråd Heinrich Friedrich Schlegel and Caroline Sigfridia Hyllested. His elder sister Sofie Amalie Schlegel was married to the merchant Tørris Bonnevie, owner of Falkensteen Manor at Horten, Norway. His younger brothers were the army officer and city engineer in Copenhagen Carl Frederik Adolph Schlegel and army officer Carl Otto Emil Schlegel (1794–1864).

Schlegel graduated from Our Lady's School in 1803. He then enrolled at the Adademy for Surgery, matriculating in 1809.

== Career ==
Schlegel was employed as a military surgeon in 1809. In 1810, he was promoted to regiment surgeon. From 1811 to 1814, he worked as a military surgeon at Frederiksborg Field Hospital. He attracted attention for performing the first Caesarean section in Denmark.

In 1814, Schlegel was appointed as garrison surgeon in Christiansted on Saint Croix in the Danish West Indies. In 1838, he was appointed as acting district physician (landfysikus) on the island.

== Personal life ==
In 1811 Schlegel married Dorthe Marie Schlegel, daughter of tenant-manager (forpagter) of Juellinge Sigvard Thomas Pedersen Neergaard and Petra Sophie Staal. They had the following children: Caroline Sigfridia Petrea Sophie Schlegel, Pauline Elise Brøndtved; Frantz Lotharius Adrian Schlegel, Mathilde Adelaide Schlegel, Heinrich Friederich Vilhelm Schlegel and Camilla Olivia Thalia Schlegel. Schlegel and his wife moved back to Copenhagen in 1845. He died on 2 December 1849.

== Awards ==
Schlegel was created a Knight in the Order of the Dannebrog in 1829. He was awarded the Cross of Honour in 1839.
