= Anders Fonnesbech =

Danish businessman (1852-1939)

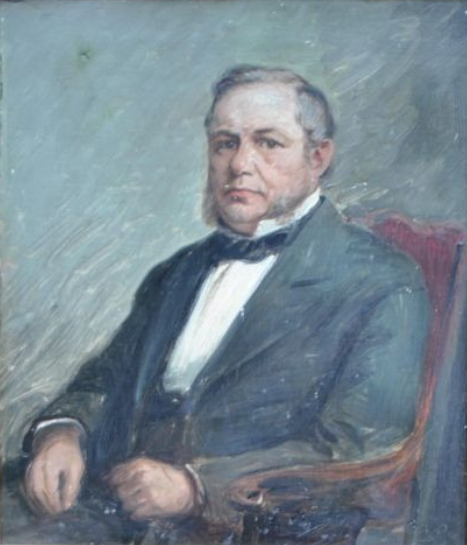
Anders Fonnesbech painted by Knud Larsen.

Anders Fonnesbech (7 March 1852 - 14 October 1939) was a Danish businessman who founded the department store A. Fonnesbech on Østergade in Copenhagen.

== Early life and education ==
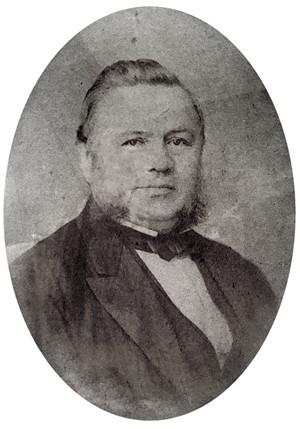
Anders Fonnesbech (1821-1887).

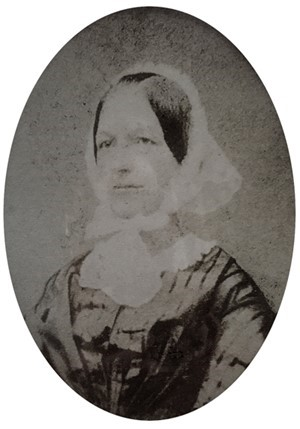
Henriette Fonnesbech (1821-1869).

Fonnesbech was born on 7 March 1852 in Copenhagen, the son of silk and textile merchant Anders Fonnesbech (1821–87,) and Henriette Maria Theresia Johanne Fritzsche (1821–69). His maternal grandfather was the glass merchant Peter Hieronimus Fritzsche (1759–1829). His paternal uncle was the landowner and politician Christen Andreas Fonnesbech. His father had established a clothing shop on Østergade in 1847. After the death of his first wife (Anders Fonnesbech's mother), Fonnesbech's father married in 1872 to Agnes Elfri(e)da Wulff (1841–1922).

Anders Fonnesbech attended Efterslægtselskabets skole on Østergade. He later worked in his father's firm before continuing his. From 1873, continued his commercial education in Germany, France and England.

== Career ==
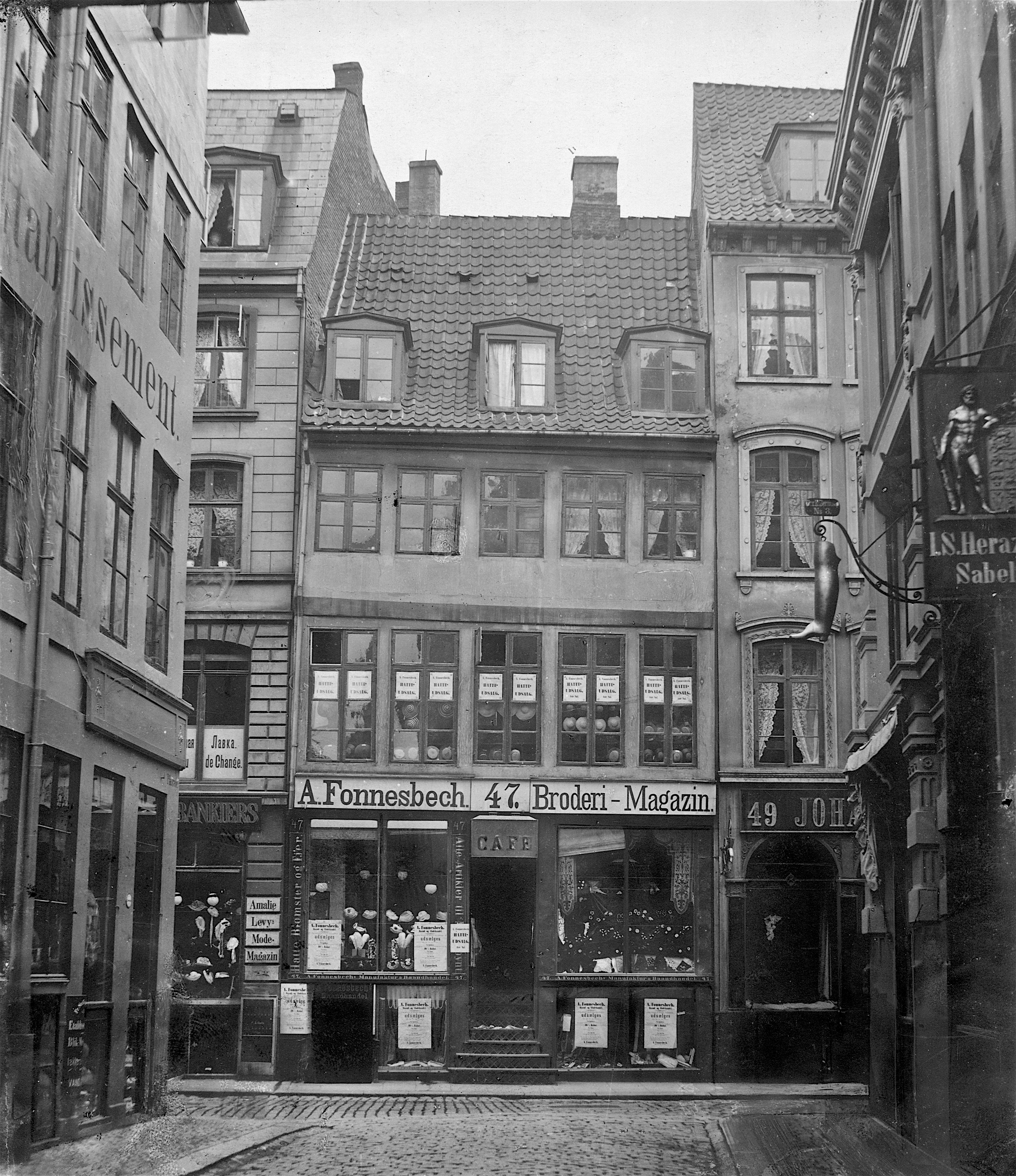
A. Fonnesbech at Østergade 37, 1880.

In the late 1870s, Fonnesbech joined his father's firm on Østergade. In 1882, he became a partner in the firm. After the father's death in 1887 he became its sole owner. In 1905, he took his younger brother Johannes as a partner, but he died in 1918. In 1919.

A. Fonnesbech was converted into a limited company (aktieselskab) with Fonnesbech as chairman of the board. The old buildings were replaced by a modern department store in 1938.

== Other activities ==
In 1987–1931, Fonnesbech succeeded Holger Petersen as the head of Foreningen til unge handelsmænds uddannelse (Association for the Education of Young Businessmen). He was responsible for the overall management of the association as well as the individual schools Købmandsskolen, Handelshøjskolen and Niels Brocks Højere Handelsskole. He was a driving force behind the Merchant School's department for women.

== Personal life and legacy ==
Fonnesbech remained unmarried. He made large donations to charity. In 1919, he was created a Knight of the Order of the Dannebrog. He died on 14 October 1939 in Copenhagen. He is buried in the city's Western Cemetery His former company closed in 1971.
