= Urania Marquard Olsen =

Danish-Norwegian actress and theatre director (1856–1932)

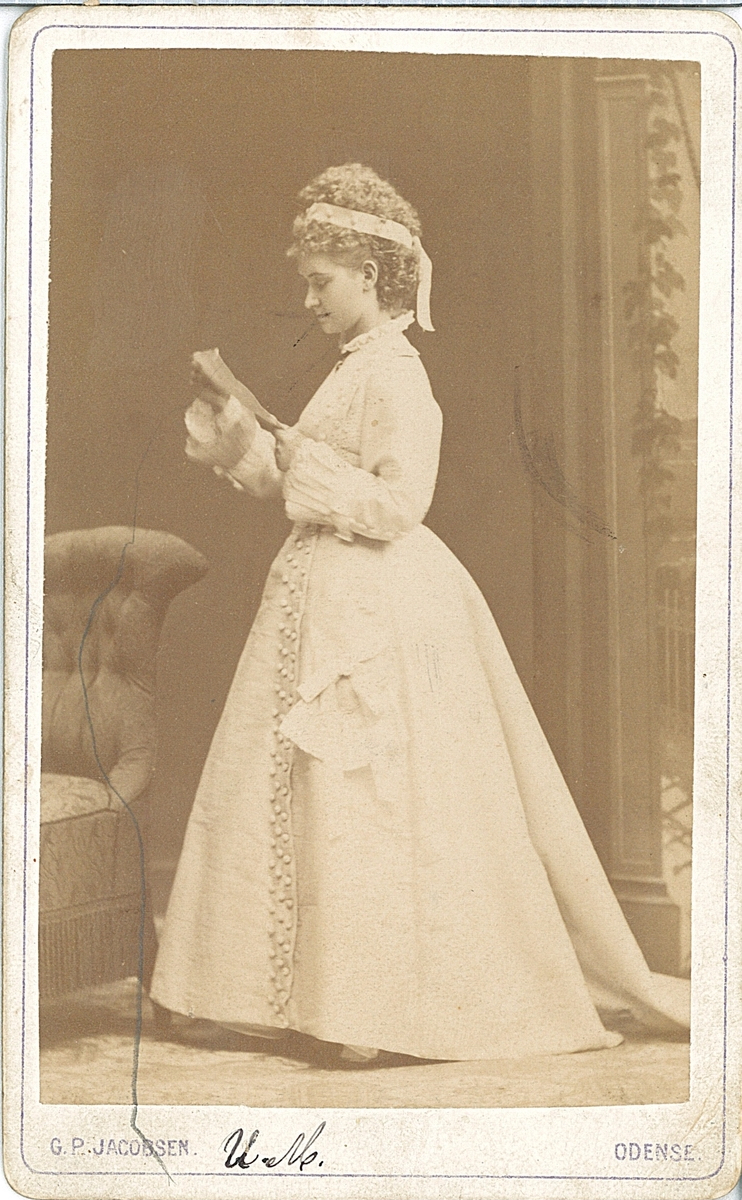
- Born: Urania Charlotte Amalie Marquard; 13 April 1856; Gottorf Castle, Schelswig,
- Died: 28 June 1932 (aged 76); Stavanger, Rogaland, Norway
- Occupation(s): Actress, theatre director
- Spouse: Iver Olaus Olsen (m. 1892; died 1927)

Urania Charlotte Amalie Marquard Olsen (née Marquard; 13 April 1856 – 28 June 1932) was a Danish-Norwegian actress and theatre director.

== Early life ==
Urania Charlotte Amalie Marquard was born on 13 April 1856 at Gottorf Castle in Schelswig to Ferdinand Marquard, a military musician, and Marie Nielsen. When she was eight, during the Second Schleswig War, her mother fled with her and her two brothers to Copenhagen while her father fought in the war. From a young age, she showed an interest in a career on the stage.

== Career ==
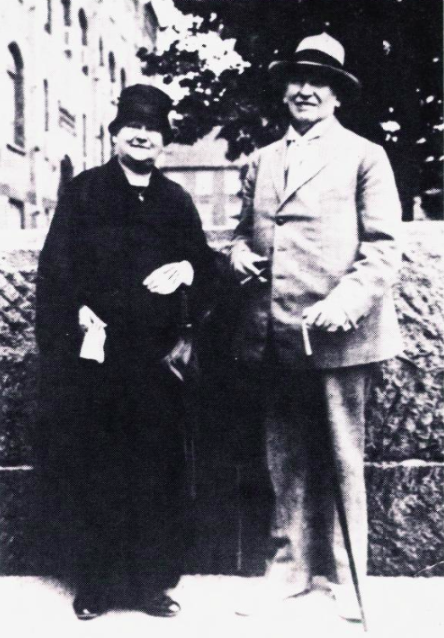
Urania Marquard and Olaus Olsen in the 1920s

After secretly learning Emilies hjertebanken, she auditioned for Mikael Bruun, director of the Folketeatret in Copenhagen, who then immediately offered her a contract there. She then made her stage debut there in the titular role of the vaudeville play Jomfru Rose on 1 September 1874. Her debut was praised in local Copenhagen newspapers, and she continued to perform at the theatre. She made her last appearance at that theatre on 1 April 1875. From 1875 to 1877, she was engaged as prima donna at the Odense Teater, where she sang in operettas such as La fille de Madame Angot, Robbers and The Theatre Bandits.

During the 1876–1877 season, she toured with Edward Jensen's company in Denmark. After the company was disbanded, Olsen joined its former members for a tour of Norway from 9 May to 28 June 1877. She then performed for several years with various Danish and Norwegian theatre companies, including a stint with Eduard Pengel in Norway between 1878 and 1879, during which she played the title role in the operetta Perle in October 1878.

Between 1883 and 1887, she was prima donna at her future husband Olaus Olsen's theatre company, a position she took over from Ludovica Levy. Among her roles there were Gervaise in Faldgruben, Karin in Maansdatter, Cyprienne in Lad os skilles and Mrs. Alving in Ghosts, the latter in which she garnered significant praise. In 1887 and 1888, she performed at the Dagmar Theatre in Copenhagen. From 1891 to 1893, she was part of Carl Henriksen's company in Denmark. She then joined E. J. Warming's company in Norway from 1893 to 1894. On 7 August 1892, she married Olaus Olsen in Stavanger. After the marriage, the couple associated with the same theatre companies, with Urania re-joining his theatre company and assisting him in managing his theatre company. On 19 April 1895, she performed in the operetta Perle to celebrate her 20th anniversary as an actress. The Olsens then became involved with the Stavanger theatre scene for extended periods, and from 1914, she was a guest performer before becoming a permanent employee at the Stavanger Faste Scene.

== Later life and death ==
In 1924, she was the subject of a tribute performance to celebrate her 50th anniversary as an actress.

Olsen died on 28 June 1932 at Alders Hvile in Stavanger, at the age of 76.
