= Frida Schmidt =

Danish teacher and women's rights activist

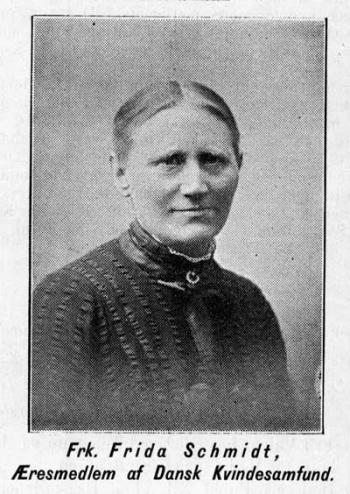
Frida Schmidt (1907)

Frida Frederikke Caroline Christiane Schmidt (1849–1934) was a Danish teacher, suffragist and a pioneering activist for the Danish Women's Society on the island of Funen. She helped to establish the Odense branches of both the Women's Suffrage Association in 1889 and the Women's Society in 1890. In the early 1890s, she was one of the strongest advocates for having women's voting rights adopted as part of the Odense organization's programme, years before the Women's Society included the right to vote in their national programme in 1906.

== Biography ==
Born in Middelfart on 15 August 1849, Frida Frederikke Caroline Christiane Schmidt was the fourth of 10 children parented by the lawyer and district attorney Lorentz Lorentzen Schmidt (1816–1867) and his wife Elisabeth Vanting (1819–1902). On matriculating from school in 1864, unusually for her times, she worked in her father's office, taking dictation and handling correspondence.

Mocked by the firm's customers and unable to be a legal witness for documents, she became aware of the second-class status imposed on women. She learnt of the cause for women's rights through Ida Falbe-Hansen and the works of Henrik Ibsen. In 1867, she trained as a teacher in Copenhagen's N. Zahle's School, heading Mathiasen's Girls School in Middelfart in 1873. She moved with her parents to Odense but had difficulty in finding a teaching post. As a result, she taught languages at N. Zahle's School, eventually opening a private school with one of her sisters in Odense. Known as Eugenie Schmidts Handelsskole (Eugenie Schmidt's Commercial College), she taught there for 34 years, introducing a completely new subject, social studies.

She helped to establish the Odense branches of both the Women's Suffrage Association in 1889 and the Women's Society in 1890. In the early 1890s, she was one of the strongest advocates for having women's voting rights adopted as part of the Odense organization's programme, years before the Women's Society included the right to vote in their national programme in 1906.

Frida Schmidt died in Odense on 22 January 1934.
