= 2010 in Denmark =

- Decades: 1990s; 2000s; 2010s; 2020s
- See also: Other events of 2010; List of years in Denmark

Events from the year 2010 in Denmark.

== Incumbents ==
- Monarch – Margrethe II
- Prime minister – Lars Løkke Rasmussen

== Events ==
=== January ===
- 1 January – A Somali man is charged with trying to kill Kurt Westergaard, whose drawing of the Prophet Mohammed has sparked riots around the world.

=== February ===
- 5 February – Danish special forces storm a ship captured by armed Somali pirates and free the 25 crew on board.
- 13 February – Three people die and others are seriously injured after a Danish bus en route from Berlin to Munich hits a barrier and flips over on the Bundesautobahn 9 near Dessau, Saxony-Anhalt. The Autobahn is closed in both directions.

=== March ===
- 19 March – For the second year in a row Denmark is revealed as the most wasteful nation in the European Union.
- 29 March – Ministers from the Arctic countries – Russia, Denmark, Norway, Canada and the United States – meet in Chelsea, Quebec, to form a working cooperation over the North Pole region.

=== April ===
- 15 April – The Foreign Ministry decides to shut its embassies in Jordan, Algeria, Bosnia and Herzegovina, and Nicaragua, as well as the general consulate in Hong Kong.

=== May ===
- 3 May – Nearly ten years after its opening, the 50 millionth vehicle roars over the Øresund Bridge.
- 4 May – The army announces that 11 Danish soldiers were wounded when their patrol base in Afghanistan came under attack. Two local interpreters were also injured in the incident.
- 9 May – Danish chef Rasmus Kofoed wins Bocuse d'Or.
- 28 May – Denmark gets a fourth place in Eurovision 2010 in Oslo, Norway.

=== June ===
- 16 June – Sweden agrees to fund study looking into whether a bridge between Helsingør and Helsingborg would be viable.
- 22 June – Parliament overwhelmingly approves the establishment of Anholt Offshore Wind Park, which will supply some 400,000 homes with green energy.
- 25 June – According to the Indonesian authorities, Sonata planned to bomb the Danish embassy in revenge for allowing the Mohammed cartoons to be printed in 2005.
- 25 June – Denmark loses to Japan in the 2010 FIFA World Cup.
- 29 June – Denmark has the highest prices for food and non-alcoholic drinks in the European Union, according to the latest survey from Eurostat.
- 30 June – Despite lowering its tax to GDP ratio over the past few years, Denmark still has the EU's highest rate.

=== July ===
- 13 July – A major European survey reveals that Danish employees are least likely to shirk work.

=== August ===
- 9 August – Over three million visitors have seen the Little Mermaid statue at Expo 2010, in Shanghai, China.
- 12 August – Prime Minister Lars Løkke Rasmussen for the first time puts a date on when Danish troops should be pulled out of Afghanistan: 2015.
- 31 August – The Danish-based Kurdish TV station Roj TV faces terror charges for supporting PKK.

=== September ===
- 3 September – By an overwhelming majority of 45 votes to 3 at the Copenhagen City Council, the construction of a new mosque is pre-approved as part of a new local plan for the city's Amager district.
- 10 September – A man is arrested in connection with a bomb at a hotel in Copenhagen. _{See Hotel Jørgensen explosion}

=== October ===
- 1 October – About 200 protesters gather outside the Danish Embassy in Paris to demonstrate against what they call 'a massacre' of pilot whales in the Faroe Islands.
- 30 October – Danish People's Party proposes a ban on parabolic antennas in public housing.

=== November ===
- 15 November – The 16th century Danish astronomer Tycho Brahe is exhumed in Prague to clarify the cause of his death, after previous tests showed high levels of mercury in his hair.

=== December ===
- 29 December – A terrorist plot "to attack Jyllands-Posten and kill an unknown number of people" fails when the accused are arrested.

=== Undated ===
- Shape ApS, a Danish mobile design and development agency is founded in Copenhagen.

== The arts ==
=== Architecture ===
- 26 February – Lene Tranberg is elected to honorary fellowship (Hon. FAIA) by the American Institute of Architects.
- 5 November – Bjarke Ingels receives the first ever European Prize for Architecture at a gala dinner in Madrid.

=== Film ===
- 20 October – Thomas Vinterberg's film Submarino wins the 2010 Nordic Council Film Prize.

=== Literature ===
- Bjørn Lomborg - Smart Solutions to Climate Change, Comparing Costs and Benefits, Cambridge University Press, November 2010, ISBN 978-0-521-76342-4.

== Sports ==
=== Badminton ===
- 9–14 March – Tine Rasmussen wins gold in Women's Single and Lars Paaske and Jonas Rasmussen win gold in Men's Double at the 2010 All England Super Series.
- 14–18 April – With four gold medals, two silver medals and two bronze medals, Denmark finishes as the best nation at the 22nd European Badminton Championships in Manchester, England.
- 7 November – Mathias Boe and Carsten Mogensen win gold in men's double at the 2010 French Super Series.
- 23–28 August Denmark wins two bronze medals at the 2010 BWF World Championships.

=== Cycling ===
- 9 February – Michael Mørkøv (DEN) and Alex Rasmussen (DEN) win the Six Days of Copenhagen six-day track cycling race for the second year in a row.
- 24 March – Matti Breschel wins Dwars door Vlaanderen.
- 24–28 March – 2010 UCI Track Cycling World Championships talks place in Ballerup Super Arena in Copenhagen
  - 25 March – Alex Rasmussen wins gold in men's scratch at the UCI Track Cycling World Championships.
- 3 October – Matti Breschel wins silver in men's road race at the UCI Road World Championships in Australia.

=== Football ===
- 13 May – FC Nordsjælland wins the 2009–10 Danish Cup by defeating FC Midtjylland 2–0 in the final.
- 11 June – 11 July – Denmark participates in the FIFA World Cup, but does not make it beyond the group stage after only finishing third in Group E.

=== Equestrian sports ===
- 23 September Denmark wins three silver medals and three bronze medals at the 2010 FEI World Equestrian Games in Lexington, Kentucky.

=== Swimming ===
- 4–15 August – Denmark wins two gold medals, two silver medals and two bronze medals at the 2010 European Aquatics Championships.

=== Tennis ===
- 1–11 October – Caroline Wozniacki wins China Open.

=== Other ===
- 24 April – Boxer Mikkel Kessler takes the WBC super-middleweight title from defending champion Carl Froch in an installment of the Super-Six tournament. The match is subsequently deemed "a classic" and "one of the best matches in Danish boxing ever" by the Danish newspaper Ekstra Bladet.
- 13 June – In golf, Thomas Bjørn wins the Portuguese Open on the European Tour.
- 5 September – Denmark wins the Team Speedway Junior World Championship final at Rye House Stadium in Hoddesdon, England.

== Deaths ==
- 6 January – Jakob Nørhøj, Socialist People's Party politician (b. 1976)
- 11 January – Asger Stig Møller, author (b. 1965)
- 12 February – Grethe Sønck, actress and singer (born 1929)
- 15 February – Rigmor Mydtskov, photographer (b. 1925)
- 17 February – Aksel Erhardsen (b. 1927)
- 4 March – Etta Cameron, singer (b. 1939)
- 3 June – Lars Kjeldgaard, author (b. 1956)
- 20 August – Gyda Hansen, actress (b. 1938)
- 9 September – Bent Larsen, chess Grandmaster (b. 1935)
- 13 October – Ulrik Cold, opera singer (b. 1939)
- 19 November – Tobias Faber, architect (b. 1915)
- 26 November – Palle Huld, actor and writer (b. 1912), inspiration behind the tales of Tintin
- 2 December – Kirsten Jacobsen, politician (b. 1942)
- 31 December – Tove Maës, actress (born 1921)

== See also ==
- 2010 in Danish television
