= 1941 in Denmark =

- Decades: 1920s; 1930s; 1940s; 1950s; 1960s
- See also: Other events of 1941; List of years in Denmark

Events from the year 1941 in Denmark.

== Incumbents ==
- Monarch – Christian X
- Prime minister – Thorvald Stauning

== Events ==
=== Sports ===
- Frem wings their fifth Danish football championship by winning the 1940–41 Danish War Tournament.

== Births ==
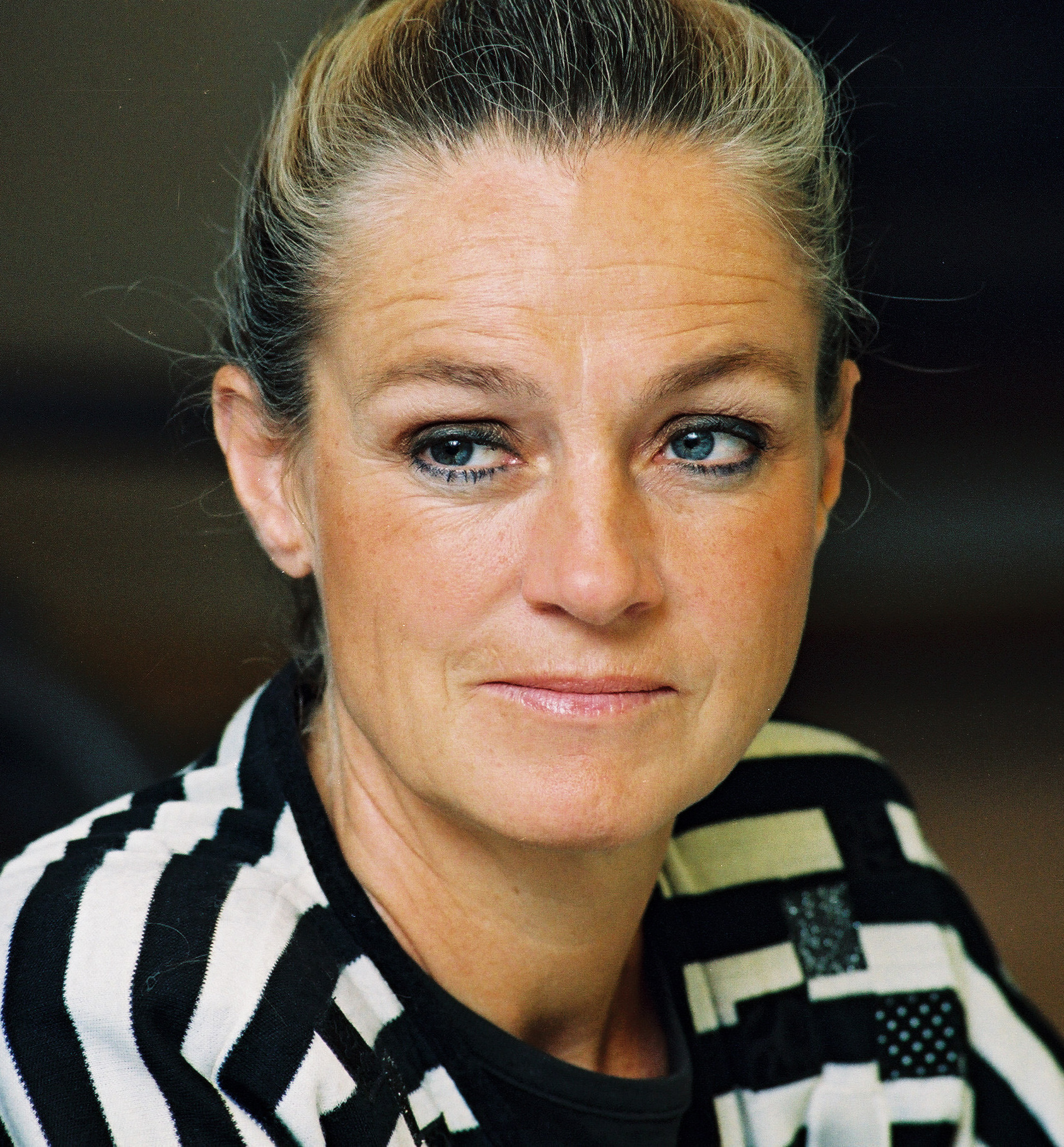
Ritt Bjerregaard.

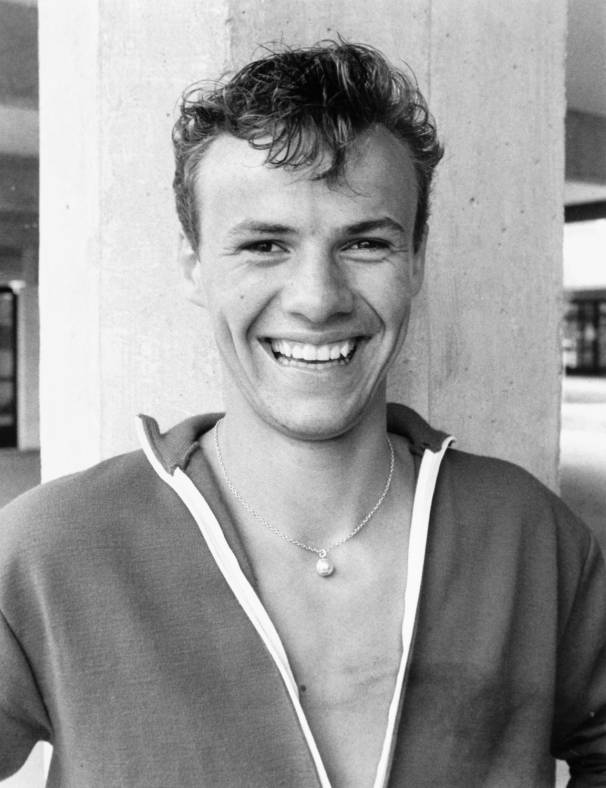
[[]].

=== January–March ===
- 8 January – Ole Søltoft, actor (died 1999)
- 20 February – Nina Hole, artist (died 2016)
- 4 March – Jannik Hastrup, writer, director, producer, illustrator and animator.
- 22 March – Hugo Rasmussen, jazz bassist (died 2015)

=== April–June ===
- 24 April – Ole Sporring, painter and illustrator
- 19 May
  - Ritt Bjerregaard, politician (died 2023)
  - Erik Reitzel, engineer (died 2012)
- 25 May – Per Arnoldi, artist
- 2 June – Peter Hansen, diplomat

=== July–September ===
- 25 July – Britta Schall Holberg, politician (died 2022)
- 25 August – Holger Bech Nielsen. physicist
- 29 August – Ole Ritter, cyclist

=== October–December ===
- 26 October – Harald Nielsen, footballer (died 2015)
- 1 November – Uffe Ellemann-Jensen, politician (died 2022)
- 6 November – Grethe Fenger Møller, Danish politician
- 28 November – Jesper Thilo, jazz saxophonist (died 2026)

== Deaths ==
=== January–March ===
- 15 January – Erik Raadal, painter (born 1905)
- 14 March – Herluf Zahle, barrister with the Supreme Court, career diplomat, President of the League of Nations 1928–29 (born 1873)

=== April–June ===
- 10 May – Gustav Bartholin Hagen, architect (born 1873)
- 20 June – Peder Mørk Mønsted, painter (born 1859)

=== July–September ===
- 25 July – Christian Sonne, politician (born 1859)
- 30 August – Peder Oluf Pedersen, engineer and physicist, IEEE Medal of Honor recipient in 1930 (born 1874)
- 28 September – Kirstine Meyer, physicist (born 1861)

=== October–December ===
- 3 November – Jens Christian Kofoed, architect (born 1864)
- 26 November – Niels Hansen Jacobsen, sculptor (born 1861)
- 12 December – Agnes Lunn, painter and sculptor (born 1850)
