= 1944 in Denmark =

- Decades: 1920s; 1930s; 1940s; 1950s; 1960s
- See also: Other events of 1944; List of years in Denmark

Events from the year 1944 in Denmark.

== Incumbents ==
- Monarch – Christian X
- Prime minister – German military rule

== Sports ==
- Frem win their sixth Danish football championship by winning the 1943–44 Danish War Tournament.

== Births ==
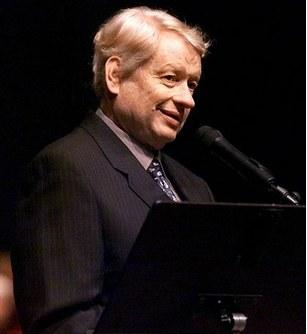
Jesper Klein.

=== January–March ===
- 5 March – Peter Brandes, artist

=== April–June ===
- 8 April – Anders Refn, film editor and director
- 10 April – Jørgen Jensen, athlete (died 2009)
- 11 April – Joen Bille, actor
- 9 May – Bente Juncker, politician
- 2 June – Poul Richardt Høj Jensen, sailor

=== July–September ===
- 20 July – Niels Fennet, businessman
- 24 September – Sven-Ole Thorsen, actor

=== October–December ===
- 5 October – Nils Malmros, filmmaker
- 7 October – Claus Bjørn, author and historian (died 2005)
- 13 November – Jesper Klein, actor and media personality (died 2011)
- 18 November Suzanne Brøgger, author
- 21 November – Tom Bogs, boxer (died 2023)

== Deaths ==
=== January–March ===
- 3 January – Aage Hertel, actor (born 1873)
- 4 January – Kaj Munk, playwright and Lutheran priest (born 1898)
- 21 February – Tom Bogs, boxer

=== May–June ===
- 1 May – Paul Gustav Fischer, painter (born 1860)

=== July–September ===
- 7 September – Ole Olsen, sport shooter, Olympic bronze medalist in team free rifle in 1912 (born 1869)

=== October–December ===
- 5 October – Prince Gustav of Denmark, prince (born 1887)
- 8 October – Carl Jensen Burrau, mathematician (born 1867)
- 20 November – Jorgen Moeller, chess master (born 1873)
