= 1936 in Denmark =

- Decades: 1910s; 1920s; 1930s; 1940s; 1950s
- See also: Other events of 1936; List of years in Denmark

Events from the year 1936 in Denmark.

== Incumbents ==
- Monarch – Christian X
- Prime minister – Thorvald Stauning

== Events ==
- 1–16 August – Denmark participates in the 1936 Summer Olympics and wins five medals.
- 22 September – The 1936 Landsting elections are held.

=== Undated ===
- The political party Danish Unity is established.
- The Viborg Handball Club is established.

== Sports ==
=== Cycling ===
- Albert Billiet (BEL) and Werner Grundahl Hansen (DEN) win the Six Days of Copenhagen six-day track cycling race.
- Jan Pijnenburg (NED) and Frans Slaats (NED) and win the Six Days of Copenhagen six-day track cycling race.

=== Football ===
- Frem wins their fourth Danish football championship by winning the 1935–36 Danish Championship League.

== Births ==
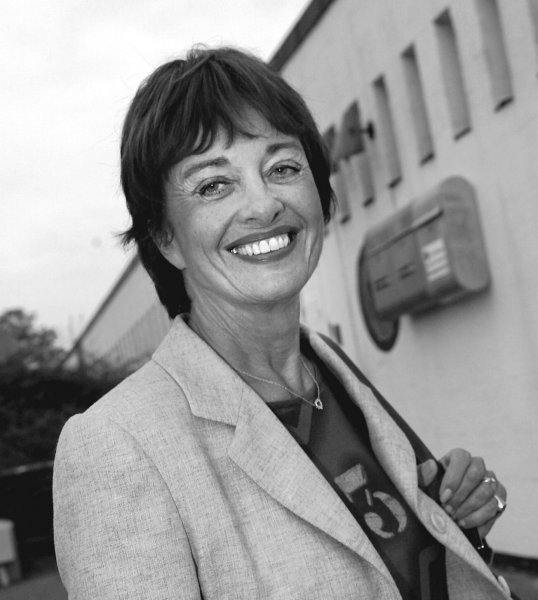
Jan Gehl.

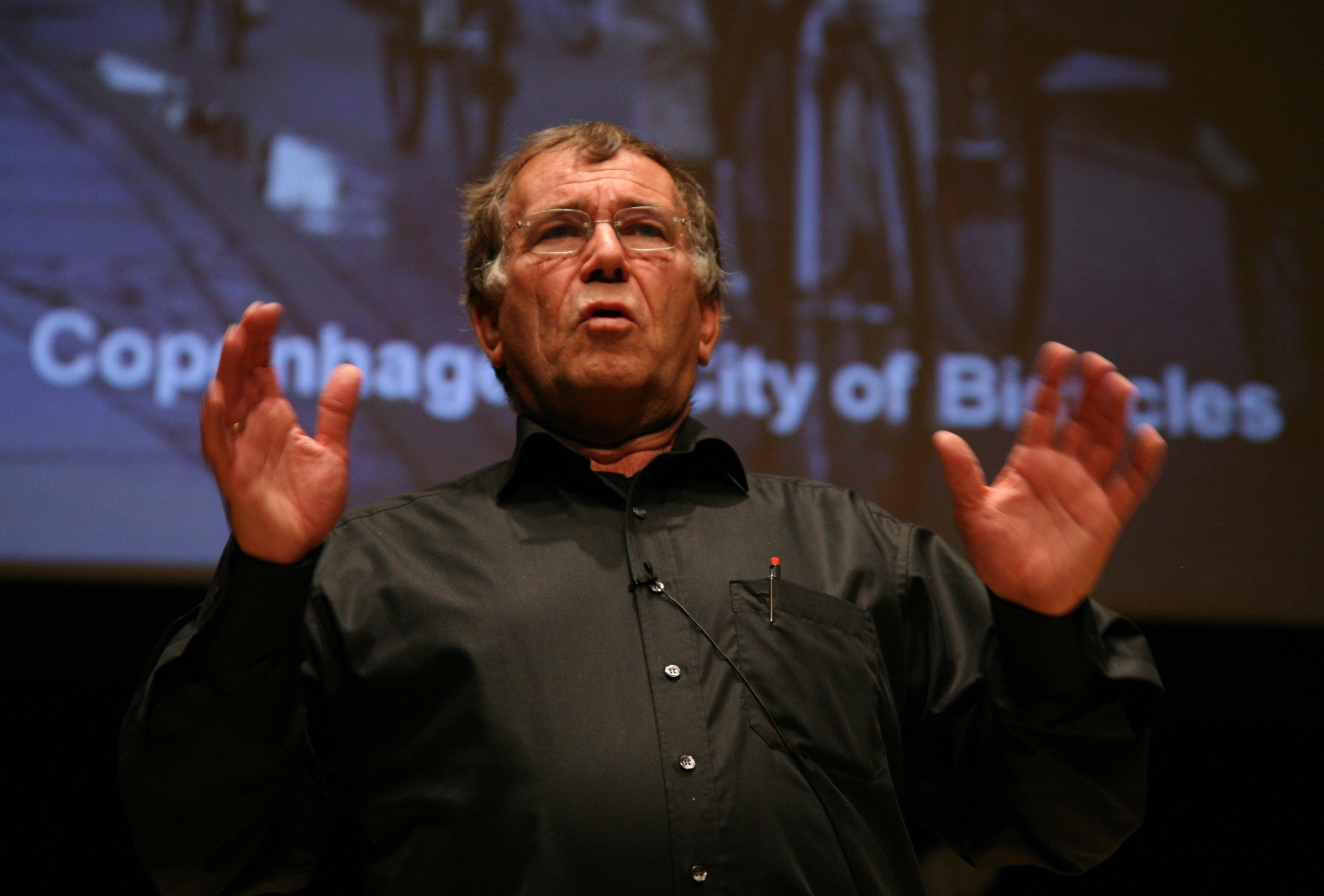
Jan Gehl.

=== January–March ===
- 13 March – Finn Kobberø, badminton player (d. 2009)
- 19 March – Birthe Wilke, singer
- 29 March – Mogens Camre, politician (d. 2016)

=== April–June ===
- 28 April – John Tchicai, jazz musician and composer (d. 2012)
- 30 June – Flemming Flindt, ballet dancer and choreographer (d. 2009)

=== July–September ===
- 10 August – Malene Schwartz, actress
- 17 September – Jan Gehl, architect, urban planner

=== October–December ===
- 1 November – Mimi Heinrich, actress and writer (d. 2017)
- 30 November – Knud Enemark Jensen, racing cyclist (d. 1960)
- 7 December – Annette Stroyberg, actress (d. 2005)

== Deaths ==
=== January–March ===
- 3 February – Heinrich Wenck, architect (born 1851)
- 4 February – Wilhelm Hansen, businessman and art collector (born 1868)
- 22 January – Louis Glass, composer (b. 1864)
- 22 February – Johan Skjoldborg, novelist, playwright and memoirist (b. 1861)

=== April–June ===
- 23 April – Thomas Bærentzen, sculptor (b. 1869)

=== July–September ===
- 3 August – Carl William Hansen, author, Luciferian, wandering bishop and occultist (b. 1872)
- 2 September – Niels Neergaard, politician (born 1854)
- 27 September – Hans Peter Prior, industrialist (born 1866)

=== October–December ===
- 9 October – Carl Christensen, Denmark's last executioner (b. 1869)
- 22 October – Hedevig Quiding, singer and music critic (b. 1867)
- 24 November – J. A. D. Jensen, naval officer and Arctic explorer (b. 1849)
- 13 December – Harald Ludvig Westergaard, economist, statician (born 1853)
