= 1935 in Denmark =

- Decades: 1910s; 1920s; 1930s; 1940s; 1950s
- See also: Other events of 1935; List of years in Denmark

Events from the year 1935 in Denmark.

== Incumbents ==
- Monarch – Christian X
- Prime minister – Thorvald Stauning

== Sports ==
- 15 March – Amager Badminton Club is founded.

=== Cycling ===
- Willy Hansen (DEN) and Viktor Rausch (GER) win the second Six Days of Copenhagen six-day track cycling race.

=== Football ===
- B 93 wins their sixth Danish football championship by winning the 1934–35 Danish Championship League.

== Births ==
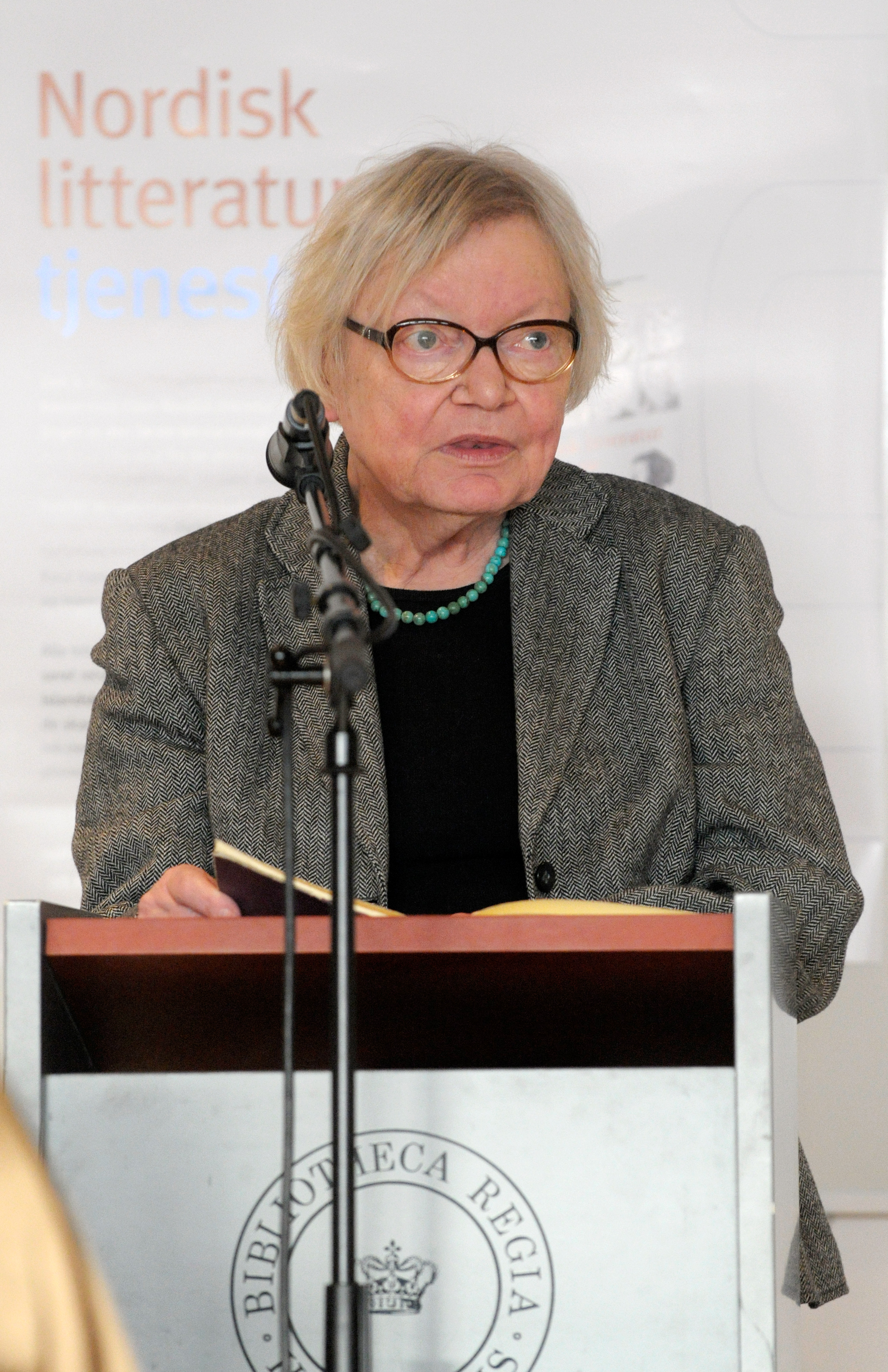
Inger Christensen.

=== January–March ===
- 16 January – Inger Christensen, poet (died 2009)
- 4 March – Bent Larsen, chess player and author (died 2010)
- 16 March – Aron Nimzowitsch, chess player (born 1886 in the Russian Empire)
- 18 March – Ole Barndorff-Nielsen, mathematician (died 2022)

=== April–June ===
- 4 April – Ole Brask, photographer (died 2009)

=== July–September ===
- 13 July
  - Paul Hüttel, actor (died 2025)
  - Kurt Westergaard, cartoonist (died 2021)

=== October–December ===
- 22 October – Inge Eriksen, writer and political activist (died 2015)
- 23 October – Egon Fischer, sculptor (died 2016)
- 1 November – Svend Jakobsen, politician (died 2022)
- 18 November – Erling Mandelmann, photographer (died 2018)
- 30 November – Hanne Borchsenius, actress (died 2012)

== Deaths ==
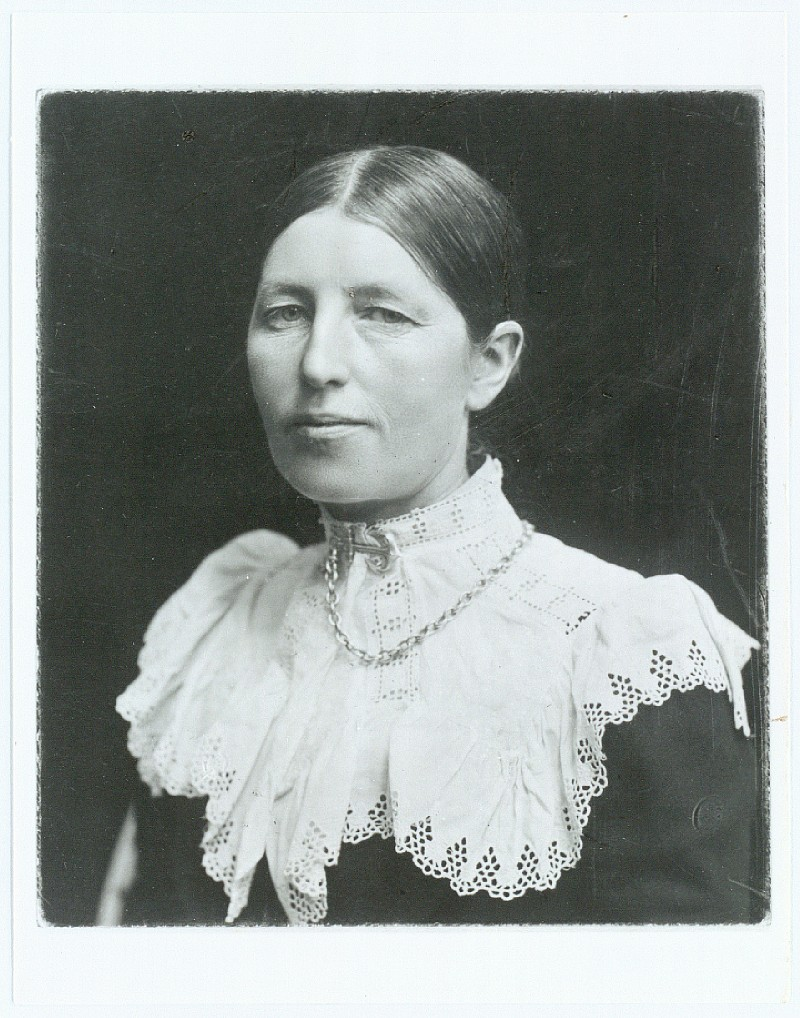
Anna Ancher.

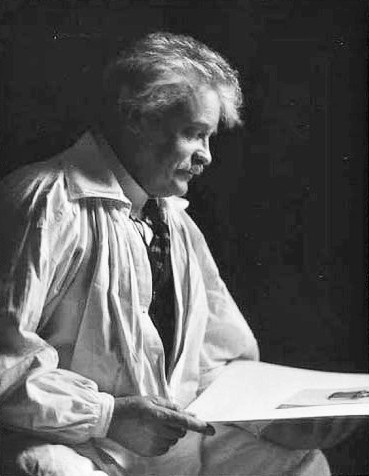
Georg Jensen.

=== January–March ===
- 7 January – Anna Wulff, educator (born 1874)

=== April–June ===
- 15 April – Anna Ancher, painter (born 1859)
- 3 May – Thorvald Andersen, architect /born 1883)
- 11 May – Nanna Liebmann, composer and music critic (born 1849)
- 13 May – Ludvig Brandstrup, sculptor (born 1861)

=== July–September ===
- 7 July – Karen Jeppe, missionary and social worker (born 1876)
- 5 September – Carl Moltke, Danish nobleman, minister to the United States in 1908, Minister of Foreign Affairs 1924–1926 (born 1869)

=== October–December ===
- 3 October – Georg Jensen, silver smith and designer (born 1866)
- 7 November – Carl Holsøe, painter (born 1863)
- 18 December – Viggo Johansen, painter (born 1851)
