= 1938 in Denmark =

- Decades: 1910s; 1920s; 1930s; 1940s; 1950s
- See also: Other events of 1938; List of years in Denmark

Events from the year 1938 in Denmark.

== Incumbents ==
- Monarch – Christian X
- Prime minister – Thorvald Stauning

== Sports ==
=== Football ===
- B 1903 wins their fourth Danish football championship by winning the 1937–38 Danish Championship League,

=== Swimming ===
- 6–13 August Denmark wins five gold medals, one silver medal and one bronze medal at the 1938 European Aquatics Championships.

== Births ==
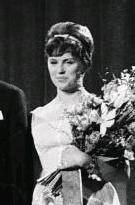
Grethe Ingmann-

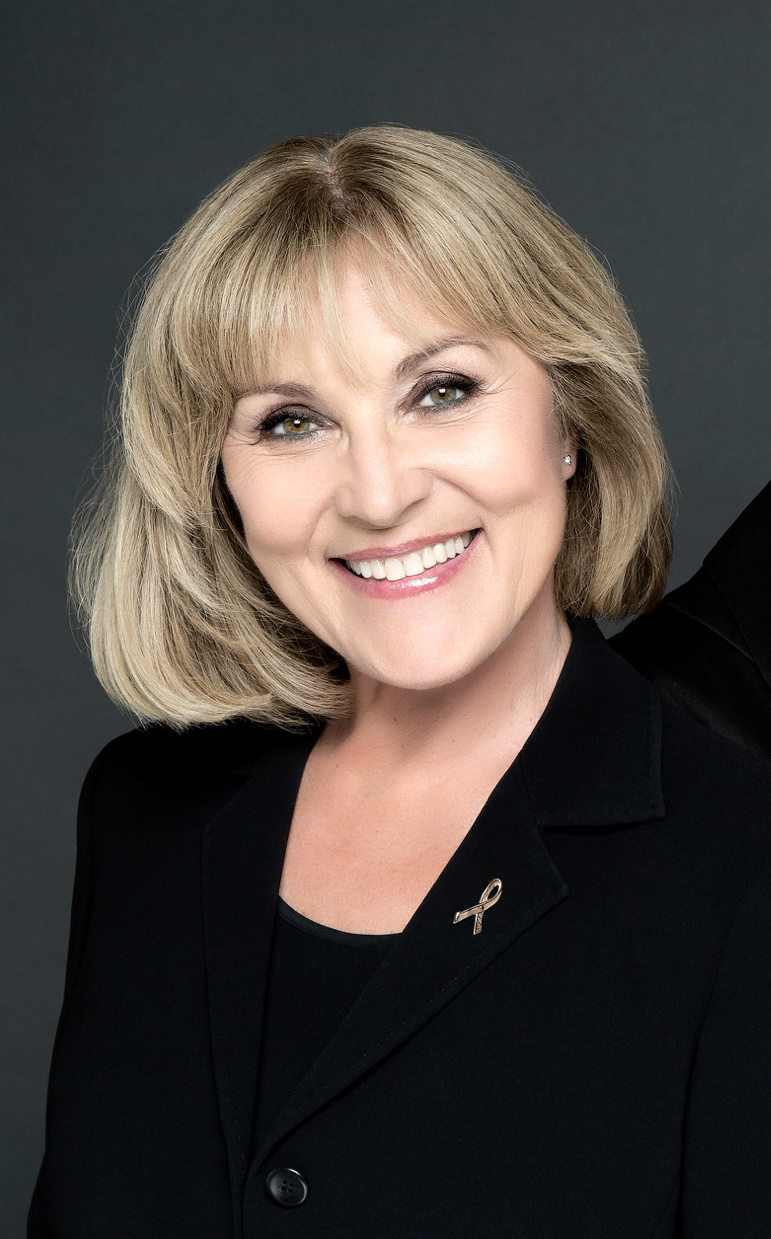
Susse Wold.

=== January–March ===
- 27 January – Povl Dissing, singer (died 2022)

=== April–June ===
- 18 April – Alice Brask, politician
- 25 May – John Olsen, artist (died 2019)
- 17 June – Grethe Ingmann, singer (died 1990)

=== July– September ===
- 12 July – Lars Hillingsø, fashion designer (died 2005)
- 18 July – Erik Wedersøe, actor (died 2011)
- 1 September – Per Kirkeby, painter, sculptor (died 2018)

=== October–December ===
- 11 October – Merete Ries, publisher (died 2018)
- 5 November – Henning Camre, cinematigraoher and arts administrator
- 15 November – Henning Camre, cinematographer, film industry administrator
- 17 November – Susse Wold, actress
- 27 November – Marianne Grøndahl, photographer (died 2012)

== Deaths ==
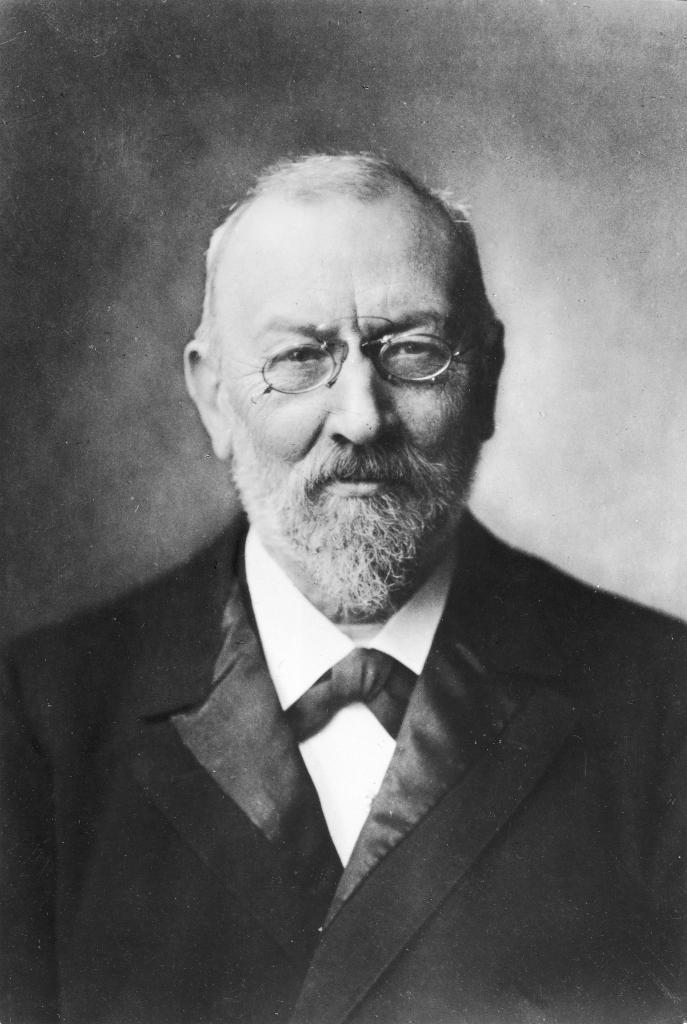
Karl Madsen,

=== January–March ===
- 3 February – Niels Skovgaard, artist (born 1958)
- 10 February – Valdemar Irminger, painter (born 1859)
- 27 March – A. W. Sandberg, film director and screenwriter (born 1887)

=== April–June ===
- 4 April – Alfred Schmidt, painter (born 1858)
- 16 April – Karl Madsen, art historian, painter and arts administrator (born 1855)
- 9 May – Thomas B. Thrige, businessman (born 1866)

=== July–September ===
- 2 July – Lau Lauritzen Sr., film director, screenwriter and actor (born 1878)

=== October–December ===
- 22 December – Johannes Wilhjelm, painter (born 1868)
