= 2012 in Denmark =

- Decades: 1990s; 2000s; 2010s; 2020s
- See also: Other events of 2012; List of years in Denmark

Events from the year 2012 in the Denmark.

== Incumbents ==
- Monarch – Margrethe II
- Prime minister – Helle Thorning Schmidt

== Events ==
- 1 January – Denmark takes over the Presidency of the Council of the European Union for a six-month term.
- 15 June – Same-sex marriage legalised in Denmark.

== Culture ==
=== Architecture ===
- 10 January – Bjarke Ingels Group's 8 House receives one of nine AIA Honor Awards from the American Institute of Architects.
- 2 March – Henning Larsen Architects' Harpa Concert Hall in Reykjavík and C. F. Møller Architects' Hospice Djursland receive two out of eight 2012 Civic Trust Awards given to projects outside the UK.
- 23 March – 3XN's Stadshuis Nieuwegein is inaugurated in the Netherlands.
- 29 May – COBE receives the Nykredit Architecture Prize at Nykredit's head office in Copenhagen.
- 23 October – Henning Larsen receives the Praemium Imperiale Award for Architecture at a ceremony in Tokyo.

=== Film ===
- 8 January – Lars von Trier's Melancholia is selected as the Best Film of 2011 by the US Society of Film Critics.
- 29 January – At the 2012 Sundance Film Festival, Mads Matthiesen wins the World Cinema Directing Award for his debut film Teddy Bear and the World Cinema Cinematography Award: Documentary goes to Lars Skree for his work on the Danish documentary Putin's Kiss.
- 12 February – Nicolas Winding Refn's film Drive is nominated for Best Film at the 65th British Academy Film Awards but the award goes to The Artist.
- 18 February – At the 62nd Berlin International Film Festival, the Danish period drama A Royal Affair takes two prizes when Nickolaj Arcel and Rasmus Heisterberg wins a Silver Bear for Best Script and Mikkel Boe Følgsgaard wins a Silver Bear for Best Actor.
- 3 March – The 65th Bodil Awards are held in the Bremen Theatre in Copenhagen, Melancholia wins the award for Best Danish Film of the previous year.
- 16–27 May – 2012 Cannes Film Festival: Thomas Vinterberg's film The Hunt premiers in competition and the Danish animated student film Slug Invasion is part of the Cinéfoundation program.
  - 25 May – The Hunt win the Cannes Film Festival.
  - 27 May – Mads Mikkelsen wins the award for Best Actor at the Cannes Film Festival for his role in The Hunt.
- 1 December – Thomas Vinterberg and Tobias Lindholm wins the award for Best Screenwriter at the 25th European Film Awards.

=== Media ===
- 10 February – Laerke Posselt wins the award for Best Portrait at the 2012 World Press Photo Contest for her portrait of the Iranian-born Danish actress Mellica Mehraban taken while she apprenticed at Politiken. Jan Dagø from Jyllands-Posten wins 3rd prize in the People in the News (Stories) category for a photo series from the Tahrir Square in Cairo.
- 24 April – Borgen and The Killing (season two) are two of the three nominees for Best International YV Series when the nominations for the 2012 British Academy Television Awards are announced.
- 27 May – Borgen wins the award for Best International TV Series at the 2012 British Academy Television Awards.

== Sport ==
- 27 July – 12 August – Denmark at the 2012 Summer Olympics in London.

=== Badminton ===
- 16–21 April – With three gold medals, two silver medals and four bronze medals, Denmark finishes as the best nation at the 2012 European Badminton Championships.

=== Cycling ===
- 7 February – Marc Hester (DEN) and Iljo Keisse (BEL) win the Six Days of Copenhagen six-day track cycling race.
- 5 May – 2012 Giro d'Italia begins in Herning, Denmark.
- 17 May – Lars Bak wins the 12th stage of 2012 Giro d'Italia.

=== Football ===
- 17 May – FC Copenhagen wins the 2011–12 Danish Cup by defeating AC Horsens 1–0 in the 2012 Danish Cup Final.
- 23 May – FC Nordsjælland wins the 2011–12 Danish Superliga by defeating AC Horsens 3–0 in Farum Park after passing FC Copenhagen in the table in the previous round.

=== Golf ===
- 1 April – Thorbjørn Olesen wins Sicilian Open on the 2012 European Tour.

=== Handball ===
- 29 January – Denmark wins the 2012 European Men's Handball Championship after defeating Serbia in the final.
- 1 March – Mikkel Hansen is named the World's Best Handball Player by the IHF after receiving 31% of the votes.

=== Motorsports ===
- 14 July – Denmark wins the 2012 Speedway World Cup.

=== Other ===
- 28 February – Frans Nielsen reaches 300 matches in NHL for New York Islanders in a match against Washington Capitals.

== Births ==
- 24 January – Countess Athena of Monpezat

== Deaths ==
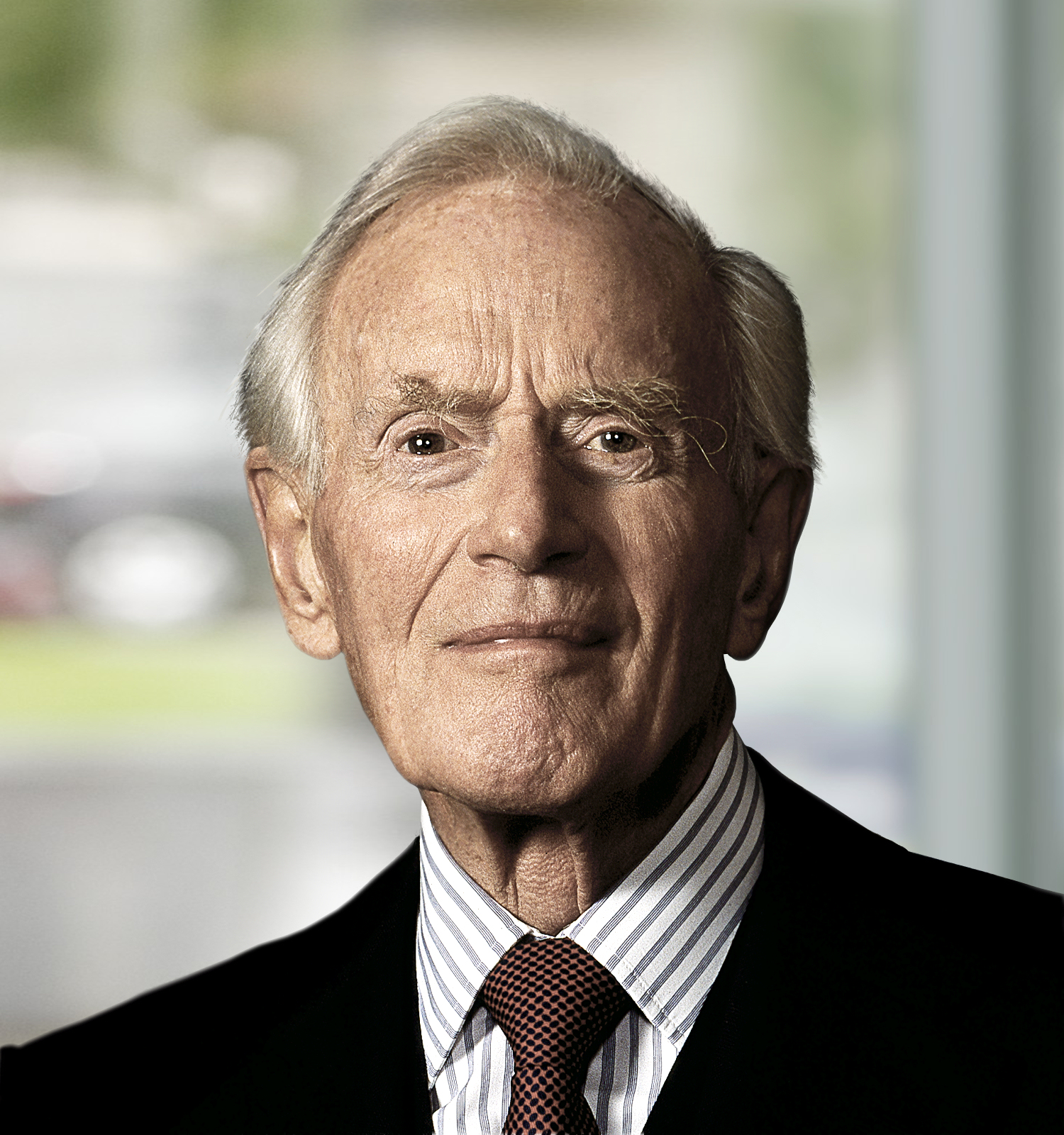
Mærsk Mc-Kinney Møller

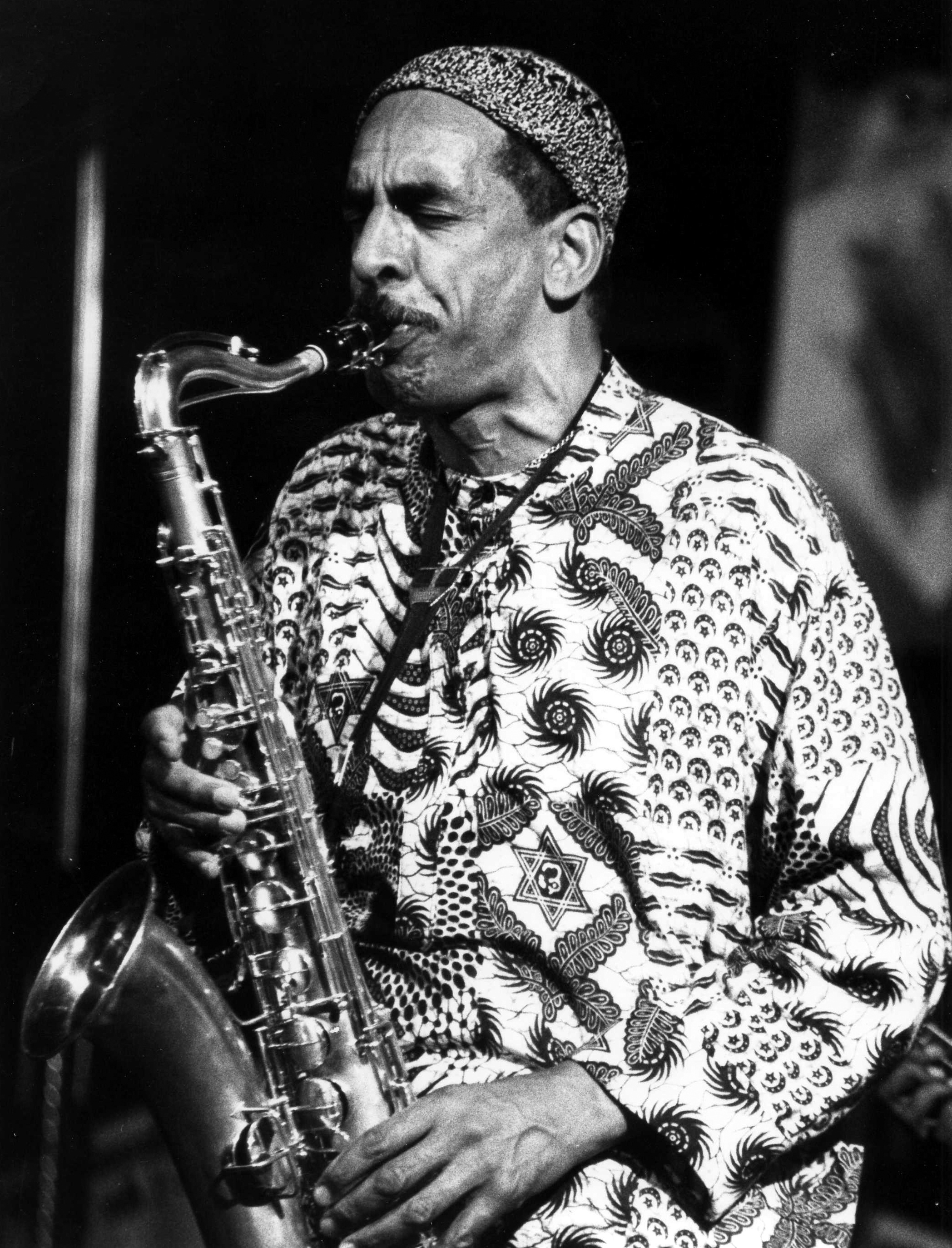
John Tchicai

=== January–March ===
- 1 January – Anders Frandsen, singer and television presenter (born 1960)
- 15 January – Ib Spang Olsen, writer and illustrator (born 1921)
- 6 February – Erik Reitzel, engineer (born 1941)
- 19 March
  - Marianne Grøndahl, photographer (born 1938)
  - Hanne Borchsenius, film actress (born 1935)
- 22 March – Kirsten Passer, film actress (born 1930)

=== April–June ===
- 16 April – Mærsk Mc-Kinney Møller, shipping magnate (born 1913)
- 6 May – Jan Trøjborg, politician (born 1955)

=== July–September ===
- 29 July – John Stampe, footballer (born 1957)
- 11 August – Henning Moritzen, actor (born 1928)
- 11 August – Birgit Fogh-Andersen, politician (born 1922)
- 27 August – Sonja Albrink, 64, politician (born 1948).
- 2 September – Le Klint, designer (born 1920)
- 21 September – Sven Hazel, author (born 1917)

=== October–December ===
- 8 October – John Tchicai, saxophonist and composer (born 1936)
- 22 December – Mira Wanting, film actress (born 1978)

== See also ==
- 2012 in Danish television
