= 1869 in Denmark =

- Decades: 1840s; 1850s; 1860s; 1870s; 1880s
- See also: Other events of 1869; List of years in Denmark

Events from the year 1869 in Denmark.

== Incumbents ==
- Monarch – Christian IX
- Prime minister – C. E. Frijs

== Events ==
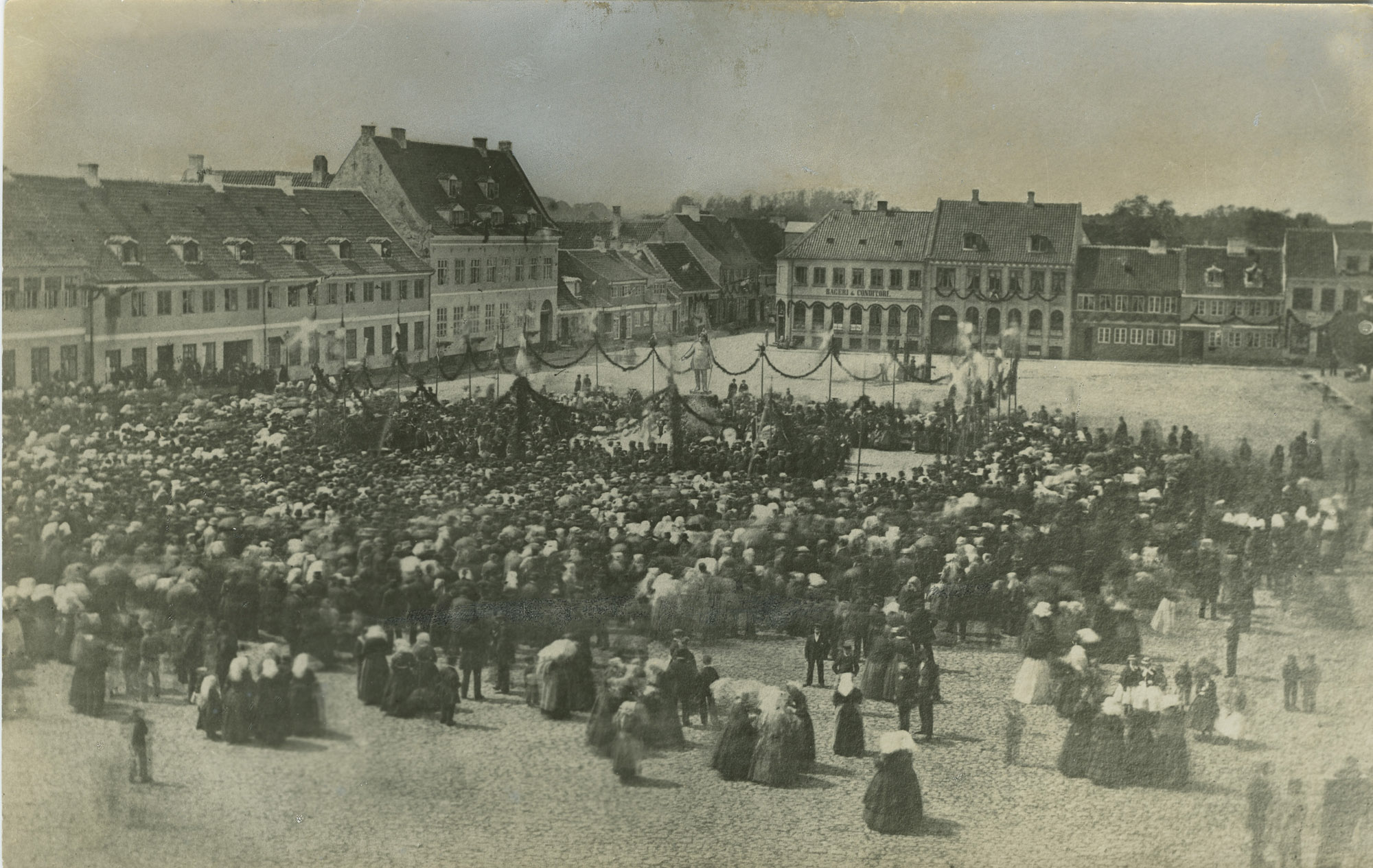
5 June: Inauguration of the equestrian statue of Frederick VII on the central square in Køge.

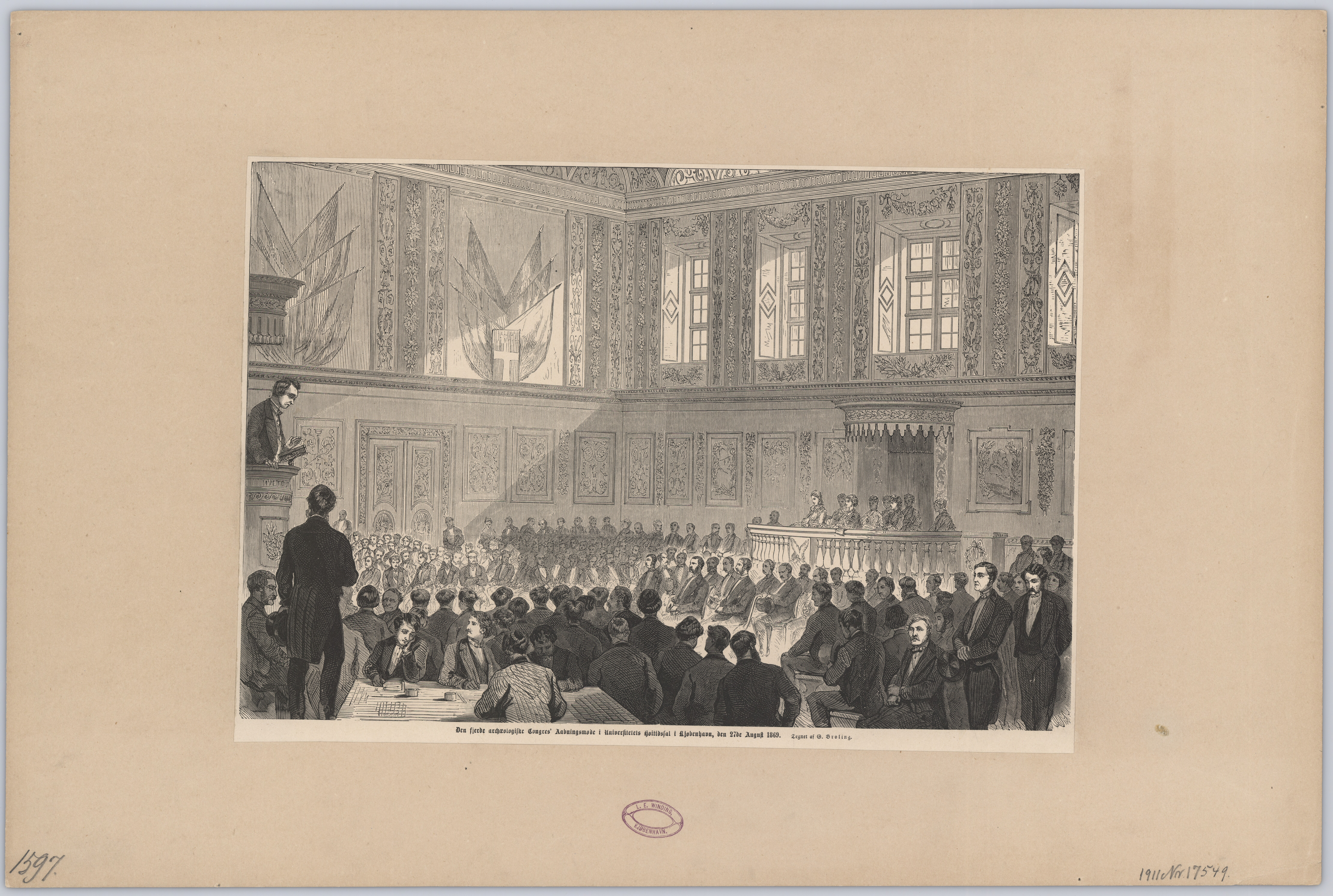
17 August: The opening meeting of the 4th Archeological Congress.

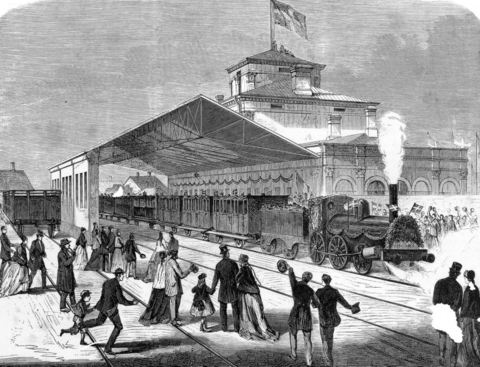
18 September: the first train arriving to the Aalborg station.

=== February ===
- 4 February – Kjøbenhavns Skøjteløberforening, Denmark's oldest ice skating club, is founded.

=== June ===
- 1 June – the telephone company Det Store Nordiske Telegrafselskab A/S, present-day GN Store Nord A/S, is founded as the result of merging three recently established telephone companies.
- 5 June – the equestrian statue of Frederick VII in the central square in Køge is inaugurated.
- 2 July – the first issue of Vestjylland eller Herning Folkeblad, present-day Herning Folkeblad, is published.

=== July ===
- 2 July – Herning Folkeblad is published for the first time.
- 28 July – Crown Prince Frederick, the future King Frederick VIII, marries Princess Louise of Sweden at the Royal Palace in Stockholm, Sweden.

=== September ===
- 18 September – the Randers–Aalborg railway line, a newly completed railroad stretch between Randers and Aalborg, is inaugurated.
- 22 September – the 1869 Folketing election is held; the Mellem Party becomes the biggest party by winning 27 seats. C. E. Frijs remains Prime Minister.

=== Date unknown ===
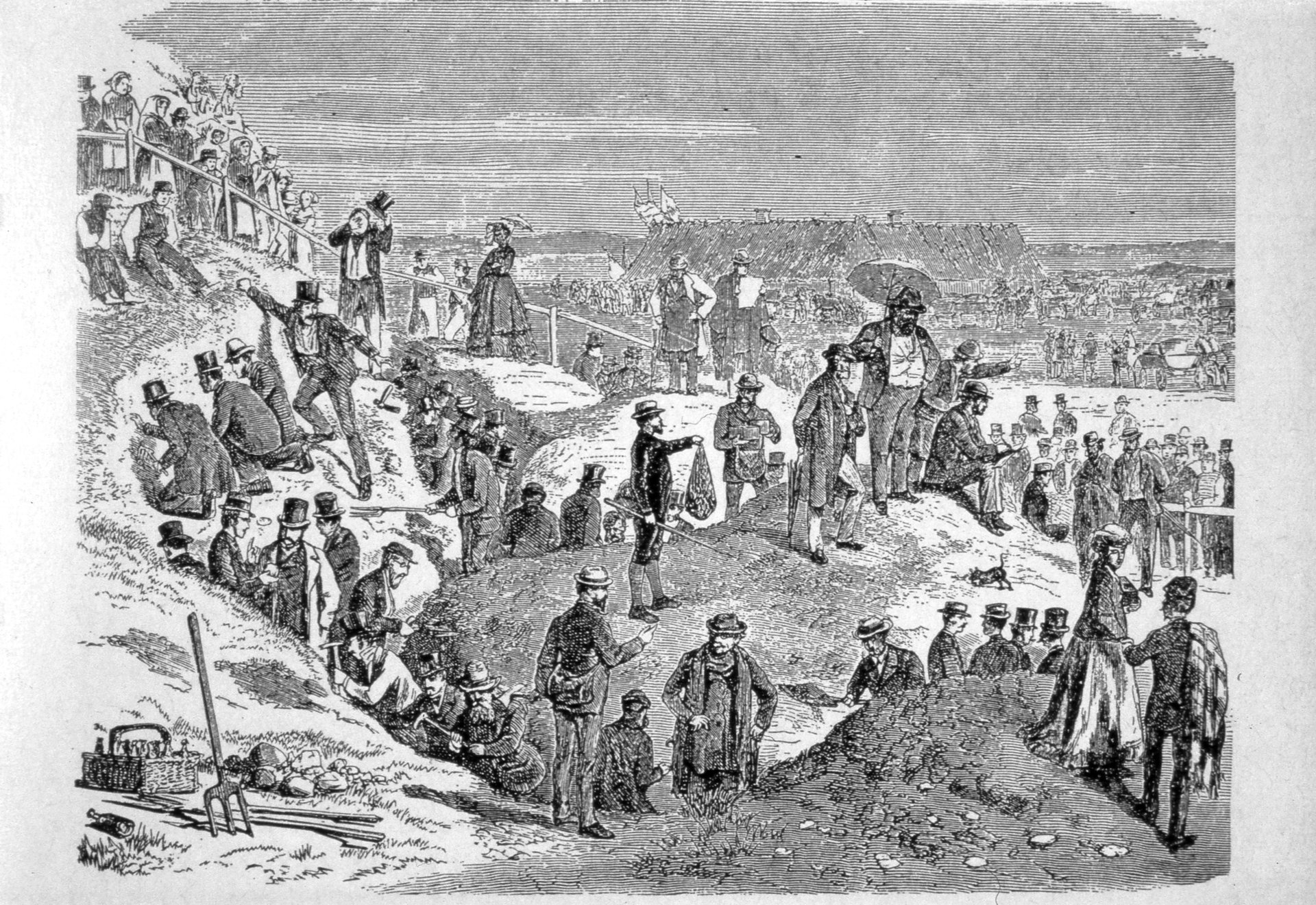
The international archeological congress at Sølager. Illustration by B. Olsen from Illustreret Tidende.

- Rud. Rasmussen, a wooden furniture manufacturing company, is founded.
- An international archeology congress visits the Sølager archeological site at Gundested.
- The Royal Danish Military Academy relocates to Frederiksberg Palace.

== Births ==
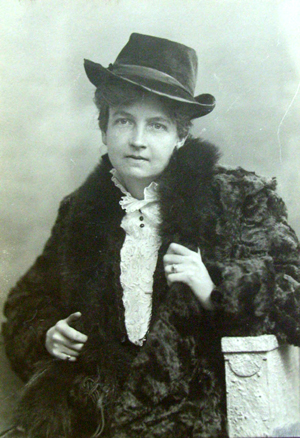
Elna Borch.

=== January–March ===
- 2 January – Carl Moltke, Danish nobleman, minister to the United States in 1908, Minister of Foreign Affairs 1924–1926 (died 1935)
- 26 March – Hans Munch-Petersen, scholar (died 1934)

=== April–June ===
- 6 April – Thomas Bærentzen, sculptor (died 1936)
- 28 April – Christian Geisler, organist and composer (died 1951)
- 7 June – Ole Olsen, sport shooter, Olympic bronze medalist in team free rifle at the 1912 Summer Olympics (died 1944)
- 26 June
  - Martin Andersen Nexø, socialist, later communist, writer (died 1954)
  - Ingeborg Appel, educator (died 1948)

=== July–September ===
- 3 July – Svend Kornbeck, stage and film actor (died 1933)
- 13 July – Christian Schrøder, film actor (died 1940)
- 13 August – Carl Christensen, Denmark's last executioner (died 1936)

=== October–December ===
- 21 October – Bernhard Ingemann, architect (died (1923)
- 11 November – Jens Birkholm, genre and landscape painter associated with the Funen Painters (died 1915)
- 23 November – Valdemar Poulsen, engineer who developed a magnetic wire recorder (died 1942)
- 6 December – Elna Borch, naturalism and symbolism sculptor (died 1950)
- 7 December – Ole Bendixen, explorer, merchant and author (died 1958)
- 18 December – Peter Esben-Petersen, entomologist (died 1942)
- 21 December – Christian Klengenberg, whaler, trapper and trader (died 1931)
- 26 December – August Blom, film director, production leader and pioneer of silent films (died 1947)

== Deaths ==
- 11 March – Christian August, Duke of Augustenborg, claimant of the provinces of Slesvig and Holstein (born 1798)
- 2 April – Frederik Treschow, supreme court attorney, politician, landowner and philanthropist (born 1786)
- 8 April – Friedrich Gotschalk, businessman (born 1786)
- 22 May – Anton Eduard Kieldrup, landscape painter (born 1826)
- 13 June – Daniel Bentley, civil servant and mayor of Copenhagen (born 1786)
- 5 October – Adolph Peter Adler, theologian (born 1812)
- 14 December – Fritz Melbye, marine painter (born 1826)
