= 2022 in Denmark =

- Decades: 2000s; 2010s; 2020s
- See also: Other events of 2022; List of years in Denmark

Events in the year 2022 in Denmark.

The year was dominated by the Russian invasion of Ukraine. Denmark took in Ukrainian refugees fleeing the invasion of their country. Danish government sent foreign aid to Ukraine, and condemned and sanctioned Russia for waging the war.

As the rest of Europe and in the world, Denmark continued to be affected by the COVID-19 pandemic and Deltacron hybrid variant, but much less so than in January 2020 and February 2022. The 2021–2023 inflation surge led to increased prices on many goods. 2022 Danish general election took place on 1 November.

== Incumbents ==
- Monarch – Margrethe II
- Prime Minister – Mette Frederiksen (acting from 2 November to 15 December)
- Government
  - Until 15 December: Frederiksen I Cabinet
  - From 15 December: Frederiksen II Cabinet
- Folketing
  - Until 1 November: 2019–2022 session (elected 5 June 2019)
  - From 1 November: 2022–2026 session (elected 1 November 2022)
- Leaders of the constituent countries
  - Prime minister of the Faroe Islands
    - Until 22 December: Bárður á Steig Nielsen
    - From 22 December: Aksel V. Johannesen
  - Prime Minister of Greenland – Múte Bourup Egede

== Events ==
=== January ===
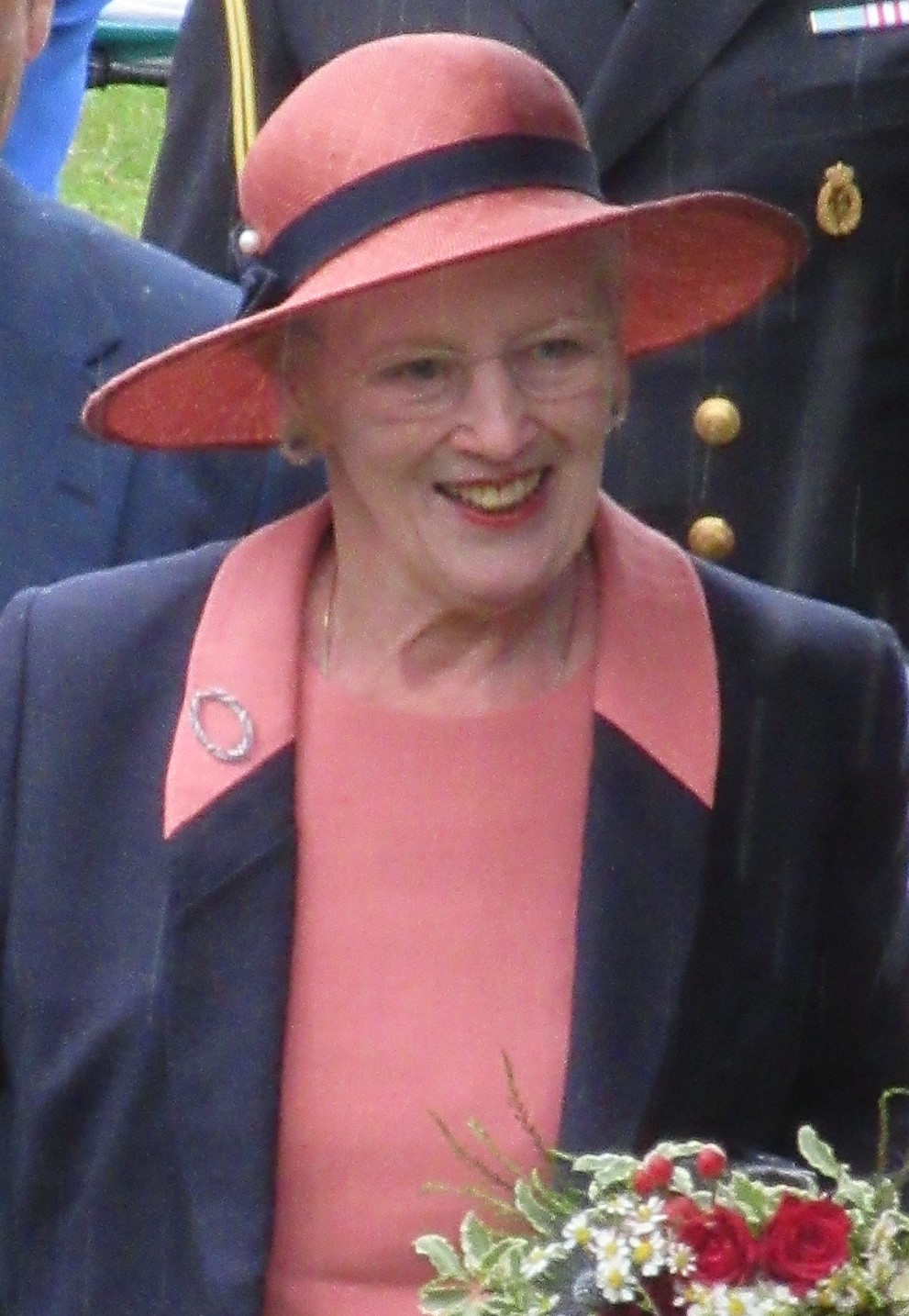
Queen Margrethe II celebrated 50 years on the throne on 14 January 2022. (Photo from later in the year).

- 14 January
  - Golden Jubilee of Margrethe II
  - MP and former defense minister Claus Hjort Frederiksen announces that he has been charged with treason for leaking state secrets. Later in the year, a majority in the Folketing refuses to waive Hjort's parliamentary immunity, meaning the police can't charge him.
- 23 January – Morten Messerschmidt is elected leader of the Danish People's Party (DF), succeeding Kristian Thulesen Dahl.
- 24 January – The daily number of COVID-19 Deltacron infections has peaked in Denmark.

=== February ===
- 1 February – Denmark lifts almost all remaining COVID-19-related restrictions except for face mask rules due to the country's high vaccination rate. Provisions in the Epidemic Law (da) expire, meaning that COVID-19 no longer is classified as a "socially critical illness" (Danish: samfundskritisk sygdom).
- 9 February – Queen Margrethe II tests positive for Deltacron hybrid variant of COVID-19.
- 25 February – Denmark joined Norway and Sweden in transitioning to the living with COVID-19 endemic phase.
- 27 February – Russo-Ukrainian War: Three days after Russia launched its invasion of Ukraine, prime minister Mette Frederiksen announces that Denmark will equip Ukraine with 2,700 anti-tank rockets.

=== March ===
- 5 March – Dansk Melodi Grand Prix: The song "The Show" by Reddi is selected to participate at the Eurovision Song Contest 2022
- 6 March – 2022 Danish European Union opt-out referendum: Prime minister Mette Frederiksen (S), at a press conference with fellow party leaders Jakob Ellemann-Jensen (V), Sofie Carsten Nielsen (RV), Pia Olsen Dyhr (SF), and Søren Pape Poulsen (C), announces that the parties have reached an agreement on defense policy. A referendum on the EU defense opt-out will be held on 1 June, and Denmark commits to increasing its NATO contributions to 2% of GDP by 2033.
- 29 March – Russo-Ukrainian War: President Volodymyr Zelenskyy of Ukraine speaks via video link to the Folketing, explaining the situation in the ongoing war and thanking the people of Denmark for their support.

=== April ===
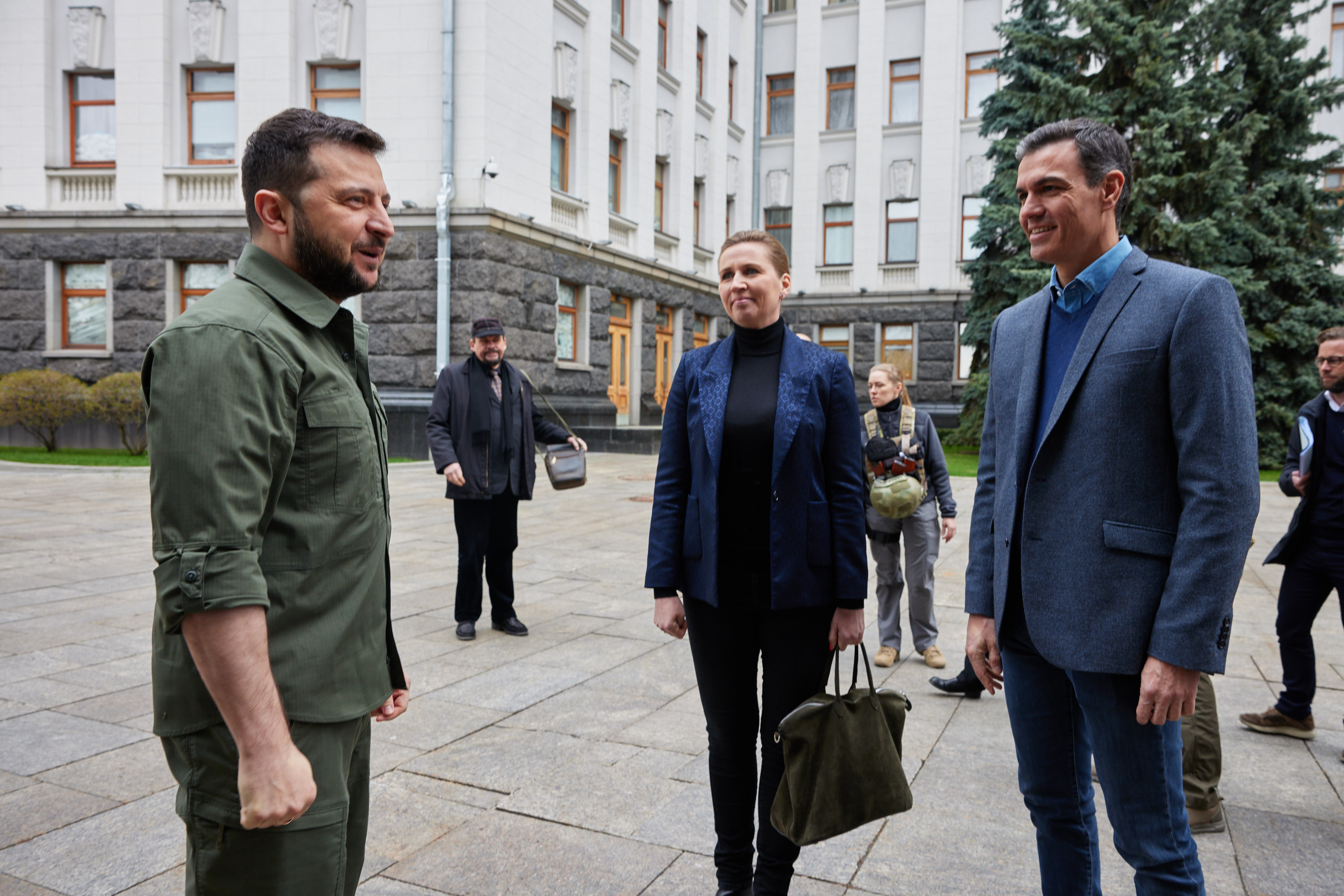
Mette Frederiksen (center) with president Volodymyr Zelenskyy (left) of Ukraine.

- 3 April – Russo-Ukrainian War: After the Bucha massacre makes headlines around the world, Denmark's foreign minister Jeppe Kofod says he supports investigations into whether the things Russian soldiers did in the Ukrainian town constitute war crimes. Later in the year, Kofod hosts an event with his Dutch, German, and Ukrainian colleagues to seek international cooperation on holding any perpetrators accountable for war crimes committed during the invasion.
- 21 April – Russo-Ukrainian War: Prime ministers Mette Frederiksen of Denmark and Pedro Sánchez of Spain visit Kyiv, Ukraine, to meet president Volodymyr Zelenskyy.

=== May ===
- 4 May
  - Narendra Modi, the prime minister of India, who is visiting Denmark, takes part in a summit in Copenhagen with the prime ministers of the five Nordic countries, including Mette Frederiksen of Denmark. At the end of the summit, the prime ministers issue a joint statement, where they promise increased cooperation and lay out their shared views on international relations, climate change, digitalization, and other matters.
  - Russo-Ukrainian War: On the 77th anniversary of the liberation of Denmark at the end of World War 2, president Volodymyr Zelenskyy of Ukraine once again speaks to Denmark by video link. This time addressing the Danish people directly, the president draws parallels between World War 2 and the war in Ukraine. He also encourages Danes to light tealights in their windows (as is tradition in the evening on 4 May), this time also in solidarity with Ukraine.
- 10–14 May – Eurovision Song Contest: The Danish song "The Show" by Reddi is eliminated in the first semifinal of the Eurovision Song Contest 2022 in Turin. In the final, Ukraine gets 12 points from the Danish televote, and Greece gets 12 points from the Danish jury.
- 18 May – A summit, nicknamed the North Sea Summit, takes place in Esbjerg. Prime minister Mette Frederiksen and energy minister Dan Jørgensen of Denmark play hosts to the heads of government and energy ministers of Belgium, Germany, the Netherlands, and the European Commission. The countries agree on the Esbjerg Declaration, in which they promise to increase use of offshore wind power and build more energy islands.
- 23 May – The first case of monkeypox is detected, bringing the 2022 monkeypox outbreak to Denmark.
- 28 May – Odense Letbane opens in the city of Odense.

=== June ===
- 1 June – 2022 Danish European Union opt-out referendum: In response to the Russian invasion of Ukraine, Denmark votes 66.9% in favor of abolishing its EU opt-out on defense matters.
- 14 June – Canada and Denmark end their competing claims for Hans Island by dividing the island roughly in half, ending what was referred to as the Whisky War.
- 17 June – A Russian warship briefly enters Danish waters twice, north of the island Bornholm. Folkemødet, an annual political festival on Bornholm, was taking place at the time, and many prominent politicians were in attendance there. Prime minister Mette Frederiksen and foreign minister Jeppe Kofod were both on the island, with the latter calling the breach a "completely unacceptable Russian provocation".
- 23 June – Former immigration minister Inger Støjberg founds a new political party, the Denmark Democrats. Less than 24 hours later, it already has 40,000 voter declarations, twice the number needed to be eligible for running in the next election.
- 25 June – The Roskilde Festival returns, after being cancelled for the past two years due to the pandemic. This is the 50th anniversary of the festival.
- 30 June – Mink case: The Mink Commission hands in its report to the Inquiry Committee of the Folketing. The Commission expresses severe criticism of prime minister Mette Frederiksen, saying that she "grossly misled" the public, but that she didn't knowingly order the culling of the mink without legal authority to do so.

=== July ===
- 3 July – 2022 Copenhagen mall shooting: Three people are killed and several more are injured in a mass shooting at Field's shopping mall in Copenhagen. Police chief inspector Søren Thomassen announces the arrest of a 22-year-old man, who is later revealed to have mental health issues.
- 5 July – Mink case: In response to the findings of the Mink Commission, prime minister Mette Frederiksen is given an official reprimand by the Folketing. Members of her own party, the Social Democrats, vote in favor of the reprimand. Former agriculture minister Mogens Jensen is also reprimanded.

=== August ===
- 8 August – Defense minister Morten Bødskov, along with his colleagues from Norway and Sweden, announce an agreement to increase military cooperation. Denmark, Norway, and Sweden, agree that they may use each other's military infrastructure and airspace, and Denmark will station a military attaché in Stockholm. The agreement was reached to counter Russian aggression in the Baltic Sea region, as Russia has violated the territory of both Denmark and Sweden on several occasions in recent years. Bødskov warns that the region "will be marked by higher levels of tension than we have been used to".
- 9 August – Authorities in Greenland announce that two civilian employees at Thule Air Base have tested positive for monkeypox.
- 15 August – Conservative People's Party leader Søren Pape Poulsen presents himself as a candidate for prime minister in the next election.

=== September ===
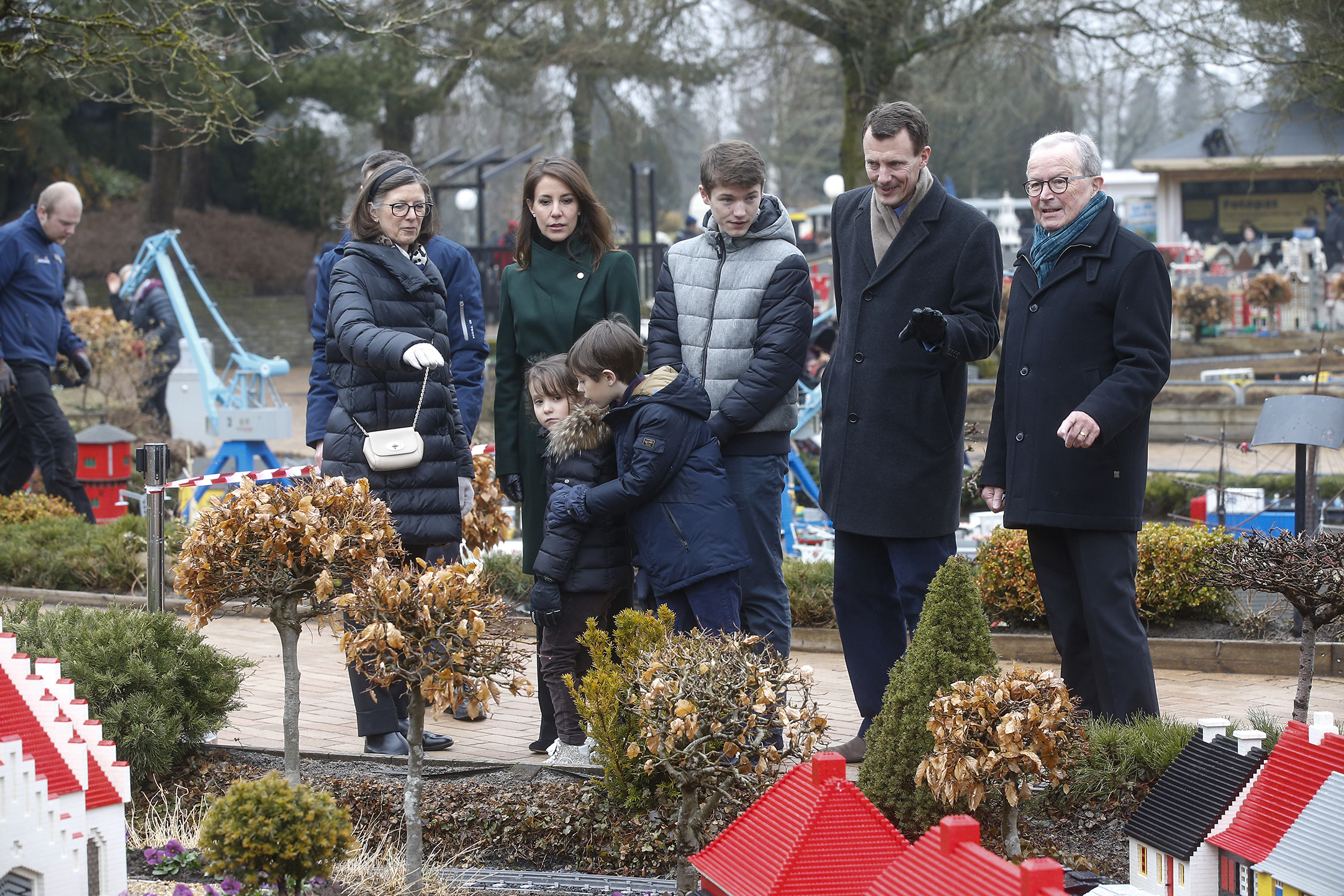
Prince Joachim with his wife Princess Marie and three of his four children. (Photo from 2018).

- 21 September – At the second time, the Royal Household announced that Queen Margrethe II tested positive for COVID-19. She had attended the funeral of Elizabeth II with her son Crown Prince Frederik on the 19th. The queen was previously infected in February.
- 26–29 September – A series of gas leaks happen at the Nord Stream 1 and Nord Stream 2 pipelines in the Baltic Sea, off the coast of Bornholm. Prime minister Mette Frederiksen says that explosions were recorded at both pipelines prior to the leaks, and that Danish authorities suspect sabotage, but wouldn't speculate on who were responsible. The Copenhagen Police opens an investigation of the gas leaks, in collaboration with the National Police, the Danish Security and Intelligence Service (PET), and others. The Danish Defence Command sends the frigate Absalon and several other vessels to the area.
- 28 September – Queen Margrethe II announces changes to the titles of the descendants of her younger son Prince Joachim. Effective from 1 January 2023, Joachim's children will no longer be allowed to call themselves prince or princess, but they remain in the line of succession. They will retain the title count or countess of Monpezat, given to both the queen's sons and all of their patrilineal descendants in 2008. Queen Margrethe justified the change for her grandchildren, who range in age from 10 to 23, as allowing them to "shape their own lives to a much greater extent without being limited by [royal duties]".
- 29 September
  - The day after queen Margrethe announced that the children of her son prince Joachim would lose their titles of prince or princess from the new year, Joachim speaks to tabloids B.T. and Ekstra Bladet. He says that he and his immediate family are dismayed, and that his children have had their identity taken from them. According to the prince, the queen shared a plan with him on 5 May under which the children would have lost their titles only when each of them turned 25. Under such a plan, youngest child Athena, age 10, would not have lost her title until 2037.
  - Russo-Ukrainian War: Prime minister Mette Frederiksen condemns the annexation referendums in four Ukrainian regions orchestrated by president Vladimir Putin of Russia, saying that the referendums "have nothing to do with the will of the people and have no legal effect".

=== October ===
- 3 October – A report on national security and defence policy up to 2035, written in collaboration between the Danish Defence, the Ministry of Defence, and other government bodies, warns about a "bleaker future". It says that a new Iron Curtain has emerged, and that the global balance of power is shifting rapidly, with Russia an increasing threat.
- 4 October – The opening of the Folketing (da) takes place, marking the beginning of a new legislative session. Prime minister Mette Frederiksen speaks of the difficulties Denmark face in connection with the energy crisis, the war in Ukraine, and economic hardship. However, she opens her speech with thanks to veteran lawmakers Marianne Jelved (RV), Henrik Dam Kristensen (S), and Bertel Haarder (V), sharing anecdotes about their lives and praising their record of service. The three are all retiring at the next election, and have over 100 years of combined service in the Folketing.
- 5 October
  - 2022 Danish general election: Prime minister Mette Frederiksen calls a general election scheduled for 1 November 2022, thus avoiding a vote of no confidence.
  - Nobel Prizes: Morten P. Meldal, professor of chemistry at the University of Copenhagen, shares the 2022 Nobel Prize in Chemistry with two colleagues. The Royal Swedish Academy of Sciences gives them the award "for the development of click chemistry and bioorthogonal chemistry".
- 10 October – 2022 Danish general election: At the request of the prime minister of the Faroe Islands Bárður á Steig Nielsen, the Folketing approves a change to the election date in the Faroe Islands by a wide margin. The election is moved to 31 October, a day earlier than in Denmark proper and Greenland, as the previously chosen election day is a Faroese day of mourning for those who have died at sea.
- 31 October – 2022 Danish general election: The Faroe Islands vote. The Union Party and the Faroese Social Democrats, who previously held a seat each, retain their seats. For the Union Party, Edmund Joensen is replaced by his granddaughter Anna Falkenberg, who becomes only the second Faroese woman ever elected to the Folketing. For the Social Democrats, Sjúrður Skaale is reelected.

=== November ===
Results of the 2022 Danish general election, showing how many MFs were elected for each party in each constituency.

- 1 November – The 2022 Danish general election takes place (excluding the Faroe Islands). The left-wing red bloc wins a narrow majority, taking 90 seats, while the right-wing blue bloc wins 73 seats, and the centrist Moderates win 16 seats. Two new parties, the Moderates and the right-wing populist Denmark Democrats, enter the Folketing, increasing the number of parliamentary parties to 12.
  - The Social Democrats get 50 seats, their best result since 2001 and more than twice the size of the next biggest party. The Socialist People's Party (SF) and The Alternative make minor gains, getting 15 and 6 seats respectively. The Social Liberals lose over half their seats, going from 16 to 7. The Red-Green Alliance also loses some support, getting 9 seats.
  - Venstre gets 23 seats, their worst result since 1988. The aforementioned Moderates and the Denmark Democrats, who both broke away from Venstre, get 16 and 14 seats respectively, some of the best showings ever for new parties. The Liberal Alliance (LA) gets 14 seats, their best result ever. The Danish People's Party (DF) goes from 16 to 5 seats, their worst result ever. The Conservatives drop to 10 seats, while the New Right rise to 6 seats.
  - In Greenland, Aki-Matilda Høegh-Dam of Siumut and Aaja Chemnitz of Inuit Ataqatigiit (IA) are both reelected. Their wins prove decisive, as both support the red bloc, giving prime minister Mette Frederiksen the option to form a left-wing government in addition to a broad government across the middle of the aisle.
- 2 November
  - A day after the 2022 Danish general election, Social Liberal leader Sofie Carsten Nielsen announces she is stepping down as party leader.
  - As is tradition after an election, the party leaders take part in the "queen's round" (Danish: dronningerunde) where they, one at a time, have an audience with the queen. Prime minister Mette Frederiksen hands in her resignation to the queen (with the previous government continuing as a caretaker government), and is charged with forming a new government. She has previously said that she wants to form a broad government across the middle of the Folketing, but due to the narrow majority for the red bloc she can also choose a purely red government.
- 16 November – Søren Gade (V) is elected speaker of the Folketing, and four deputy speakers are elected. He replaces Henrik Dam Kristensen (S), who retired from the Folketing at the election two weeks before. As the largest parties besides the speaker's party, the Social Democrats, Moderates, and Socialist People's Party get to pick first deputy speaker Leif Lahn Jensen, second deputy speaker Jeppe Søe, and third deputy speaker Karsten Hønge respectively. With the Denmark Democrats and Liberal Alliance tied for next-largest party, Gade has to draw lots for which of them gets to select the fourth deputy speaker, with Karina Adsbøl of the Denmark Democrats winning. Gade had been temporarily elected speaker the day before.
- 21 November – 2022 FIFA World Cup: In a joint statement with six other associations, the Danish Football Association (DBU) announces that players will not wear OneLove rainbow armbands at the 2022 FIFA World Cup in Qatar. The decision comes after FIFA announces that the captains of any team wearing the band will receive a yellow card. Several qualifying teams had planned to wear the OneLove armband, which is part of an anti-discrimination campaign, in protest against the poor state of LGBT rights in Qatar.
- 22 November – 2022 FIFA World Cup: A day after the OneLove armband decision, Helle Thorning-Schmidt attends the Denmark vs Tunisia match wearing a blue dress with rainbows on the sleeves. Thorning-Schmidt, who was prime minister of Denmark from 2011 to 2015, is in Qatar in her capacity as head of the DBU's Governance and Development Committee (Danish: Governance- og Udviklingskomite). Many fans and journalists were refused entry to the stadium for wearing rainbow-colored clothing.

=== December ===
- 13 December – After 41 days of negotiations to form a government, the longest in Danish history, acting prime minister Mette Frederiksen informs queen Margrethe II that she has reached an agreement to form a new government. It consists of Frederiksen's own Social Democrats, as well as Venstre and the Moderates. This constellation is unusual, as Danish politics is divided into a Social Democrats-led red bloc and a Venstre-led blue bloc, with either bloc typically having a majority and forming a government. A government including both major parties has been tried only once before in the post-war era, after the 1979 election. Another unusual feature is that it is a majority government, unlike most Danish governments who have relied on supporting parties to garner a majority. (Note: The three parties have a combined 89 seats in the Folketing, one short of a majority. However, three of the four Faroese and Greenlandic members of the Folketing (da) are affiliated with sister parties to the governing parties, and as such the new government has a majority of 92 seats.) Hopeful of working with other parties despite having a majority already, Frederiksen promises to "search for ... broader majorities than the one we are presenting".
- 14 December – A day after they announced the formation of a new government, prime minister Mette Frederiksen (S) and fellow party leaders Jakob Ellemann-Jensen (V) and Lars Løkke Rasmussen (M) present the coalition agreement laying out their policies. Among other things, the government plans to abolish Great Prayer Day (Danish: Store Bededag) as a holiday to increase productivity, increase military spending, merge the "Arne pension" (da) with other early pension schemes, abolish the municipal job centers (part of wider reforms to public employment services), reduce the high-earners income tax (Danish: topskat), and commit to carbon neutrality by 2045.
- 15 December – Prime minister Mette Frederiksen presents her new government at Amalienborg. There are 23 ministers, of which 11 are from the Social Democrats, seven are from Venstre, and five are from the Moderates. For the Social Democrats, finance minister Nicolai Wammen and tax minister Jeppe Bruus retain their posts, while Peter Hummelgaard becomes justice minister. Venstre leader Jakob Ellemann-Jensen becomes deputy prime minister and defense minister, while his party also secures the posts of economy minister (Troels Lund Poulsen), and interior minister and health minister (both Sophie Løhde). Moderates leader and former prime minister Lars Løkke Rasmussen becomes foreign minister.

== Culture ==
=== Film ===
- 10 December Zlatko Burić wins the European Film Award for Best Actor at the 35th European Film Awards for his role in Triangle of Sadness.

== Sports ==
- 4–20 February – Denmark sends 62 athletes to take part in the 2022 Winter Olympics in Beijing.

=== Badminton ===
- 20 March – Viktor Axelsen wins gold in Men's Single at 2022 All England Open
- 30 April
  - Viktor Axelsen wins the gold medal in Men's Single at the 2022 European Badminton Championships.
  - Anders Antonsen wins the silver medal in Men's Single at the 2022 European Badminton Championships.
- 15 May – Denmark wins a bronze medal at the 2022 Thomas & Uber Cup.
- 3 July – Viktor Axelsen wins the 2023 Malaysia Open.
- 28 August – Viktor Axelsen wins a gold medal in men's single at the 2022 BWF World Championships.
- 18–23 October 2022 Denmark Open takes place in Odense.
- 30 October – Viktor Axelsen wins gold in Men's Single at the French Open.
- 11 December – Viktor Axelsen wins gold in Men's Single at the 2022 BWF World Tour Finals.

=== Canoe and Kayak ===
- 28–31 July – Denmark wins four gold medals, two silver medals and two bronze medals at the 2022 Canoe Marathon European Championships-
- 18–21 August – Denmark wins one gold medal, one silver medal and one bronze medal at the 2022 Canoe Sprint European Championships-
- 29 September – 2 October – Denmark wins two silver medals and two bronze medals at the 2022 ICF Canoe Marathon World Championships.

=== Cycling ===
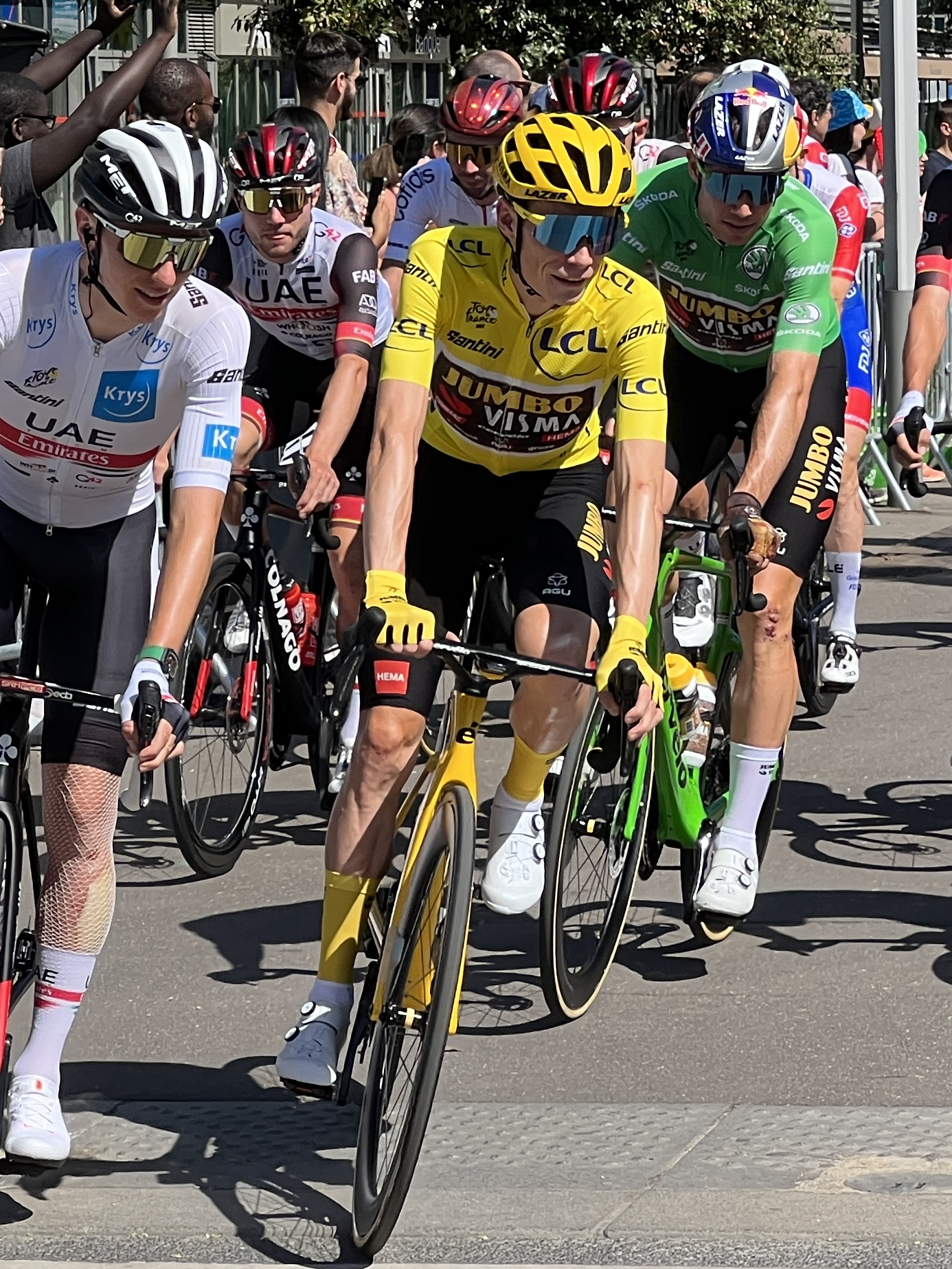
Jonas Vingegaard (in yellow) and other riders during Stage 21 of the Tour de France.

- 1–3 July – The 2022 Tour de France comes to Denmark, with three stages:
  - 1 July – Stage 1, an individual time trial in Copenhagen
  - 2 July – Stage 2, a flat stage between Roskilde and Nyborg
  - 3 July – Stage 3, another flat stage between Vejle and Sønderborg.
- 12 July – Magnus Cort wins Stage 10 of the 2022 Tour de France.
- 13 July – Jonas Vingegaard wins Stage 11 of the 2022 Tour de France and grabs the yellow jersey.
- 15 July – Mads Pedersen wins Stage 13 of the 2022 Tour de France.
- 22 July – Jonas Vingegaard wins Stage 18 of the 2022 Tour de France.
- 24 July – Jonas Vingegaard wins the 2022 Tour de France, securing both the yellow jersey and the polka dotted jersey.
- 26 July – Cecilie Uttrup Ludwig wins Stage 3 of the 2022 Tour de France Femmes.
- 14 August – Cecilie Uttrup Ludwig wins the 2022 Tour of Scandinavia.
- 16–20 August – 2022 Danmark Rundt.
- 2 September – Mads Pedersen wins Stage 13 of the 2022 Vuelta a España.
- 6 September – Mads Pedersen wins Stage 16 of the 2022 Vuelta a España.
- 9 September – Mads Pedersen wins Stage 19 of the 2022 Vuelta a España.
- 11 September – Mads Pedersen wins the Green jersey at the 2022 Vuelta a España.
- 17 September – Mattias Skjelmose Jensen wins the 2022 Tour de Luxembourg.
- 12–16 October – Denmark wins one silver medal and two bronze medals at the 2022 UCI Track Cycling World Championships.

=== Equestrian sports ===
- 6–14 August – Denmark wins five gold medals, four silver medals and one bronze medals at the 2022 FEI World Championships in Herning, Denmark.

=== Football ===
- 22 May – F.C. Copenhagen wins the 2021–22 Danish Superliga
- 26 May – 2022 Danish Cup Final: After playing 1–1 in ordinary time and with no additional goals in overtime, FC Midtjylland beats OB 4–3 in the penalty shoot-out at Brøndby Stadium.
- 15 July – The 2022–23 Danish Superliga kicks off.
- 2–4 August – The 2022–23 Danish Cup kicks off.
- 24 August – F.C. Copenhagen reaches the group stage of the 2022–23 UEFA Champions League by defeating Trabzonspor 2–1 on aggregate.
- 3 November – FC Midtjylland advances from Group F of the 2022–23 UEFA Europa League by defeating finishing second in the group after beating SK Sturm Graz 2–0 in the last match.
- 22–30 November – The Danish national team takes part in Group D at the 2022 FIFA World Cup in Qatar. The team is eliminated in the group stage after drawing against Tunisia and losing to France and Australia.
  - 22 November – Denmark vs Tunisia: Denmark plays 0–0 against Tunisia.
  - 26 November – France vs Denmark: Denmark loses 1–2 to France. After a goalless first half, Kylian Mbappé scores for France. Andreas Christensen equalizes shortly after, but Mbappé scores again towards the end of ordinary time.
  - 30 November – Australia vs Denmark: Denmark loses 0–1 to Australia. Mathew Leckie scores the only goal of the match.

=== Golf ===
- 6 February – Nicolai Højgaard wins the Ras Al Khaimah Championship on the 2022 European Tour.
- 13 March – Nanna Koerstz Madsen wins the Honda LPGA Thailand.
- 8 May – Thorbjørn Olesen wins the British Masters on the 2022 European Tour.
- 22 November – Joachim B. Hansen wins the Joburg Open.

=== Handball ===
- 31 May – Odense Håndbold wins the 2021–22 Danish Women's Handball League-
- 5 June – Team Esbjerg loses 26–32 to Metz Handball in the final of the 2021–22 Women's EHF Champions League.
- 10 June – GOG wins the 2021–22 Danish Men's Handball League by defeating Aalborg Håndbold in the final.
- 19 December – Denmark defeats Spain 35–26 at the 2021 World Women's Handball Championship.

=== Sailing ===
- 16 October – Anne-Marie Rindom wins a gold medal in Lazer Radial at the Women's ILCA 6 World Championship in Kemah.

=== Tennis ===
- 1 May – Holger Rune wins the 2022 BMW Open – Singles.
- 6 November – Holger Rune wins the 2022 Rolex Paris Masters by defeating Novak Djokovic, 3–6, 6–3, 7–5, in an upset victory. The victory moves him up to number 10 in the ATP rankings, with CNN describing him as a "rising star". Rune beat five top 10 players during the course of the tournament.

=== Other ===
- 12 March – Danish-Nigerian basketball player Gabriel Lundberg signs a contract with the Phoenix Suns, becoming the first Dane to sign with an NBA club. He plays his first match for the team on 4 April.
- 26 – 30 June – 2022 World Orienteering Championships takes place in Denmark.
- 17 August – Helena Rosendahl Bach wins a silver medal in Women's 200 metre butterfly.

== Deaths ==
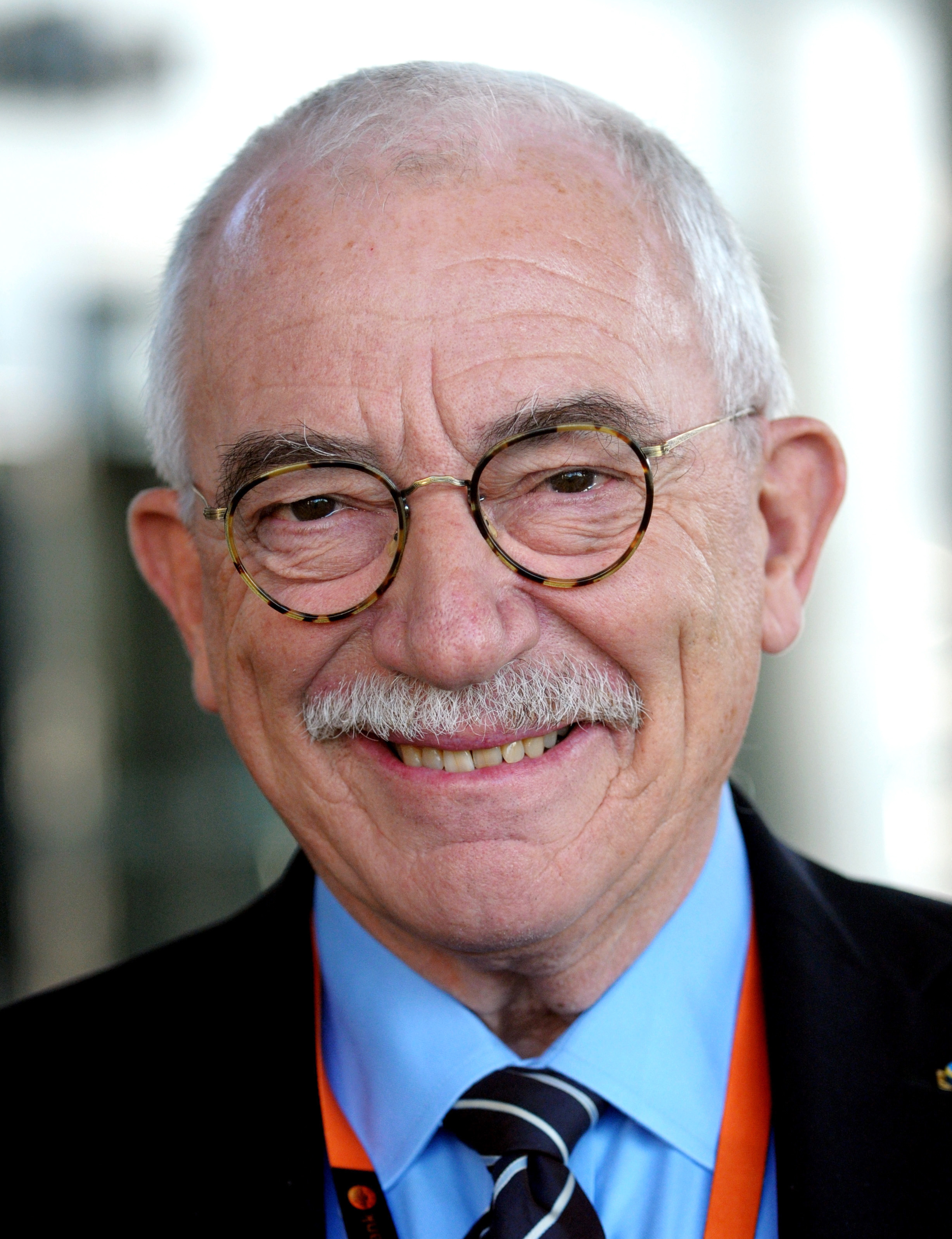
Uffe Ellemann-Jensen.

=== January–March ===
- 20 January – Anne-Lise Salling Larsen, nurse and professor (born 1934)
- 31 January – Flemming Quist Møller, writer and illustrator (born 1942)
- 23 February – Britta Schall Holberg, politician and former interior minister of Denmark (born 1941)

=== April–June ===
- 1 April – Anne Knudsen, anthropologist, editor, journalist and researcher (died 1948)
- 13 May – Ben Roy Mottelson, American-Danish physicist and Nobel laureate (born 1926 in USA)
- 28 May – Svend Jakobsen, politician and former speaker of the Folketing (born 1935)
- 19 June – Uffe Ellemann-Jensen, politician, former foreign minister of Denmark, and former leader of Venstre (born 1941)
- 26 June – Thue Christiansen, Greenlandic teacher who designed the flag of Greenland (born 1940)

=== July–September ===
- 18 July – Povl Dissing, singer and composer (born 1938)
- 23 August – Arlette Andersen (da), French-Danish Holocaust survivor and public speaker (born 1924)
- 27 August – Mogens Palle, boxing promoter and manager (born 1934)
- 4 September – Thorkild Simonsen, politician, former interior minister of Denmark, and former mayor of Aarhus (born 1926)
- 15 September – Poul Thomsen (da), television host (born 1938)

=== October–December ===
- 23 November – Hugo Helmig, singer (born 1998)
