= 1864 in Denmark =

- Decades: 1840s; 1850s; 1860s; 1870s; 1880s
- See also: Other events of 1864; List of years in Denmark

Events from the year 1864 in Denmark.

== Incumbents ==
- Monarch – Christian IX
- Prime minister – Ditlev Gothard Monrad (until 11 July), Christian Albrecht Bluhme

== Events ==
February

- 1 February – The Second Schleswig War breaks out after the First Schleswig War had left the Schleswig-Holstein Question unsettled when Preussia-Austria crosses the River Eider with 57,000 soldiers.
- 6 February – Battle of Sankelmark, a minor battle which occurs at Sankelmark, on the road between Schleswig and Flensburg, during the Danish retreat from Danevirke.
- 29 February – The Battle of Vorbasse, another minor engagement.

March

- 17 March – The Battle of Jasmund near the Prussian island of Rügen results in a tactical Danish victory.

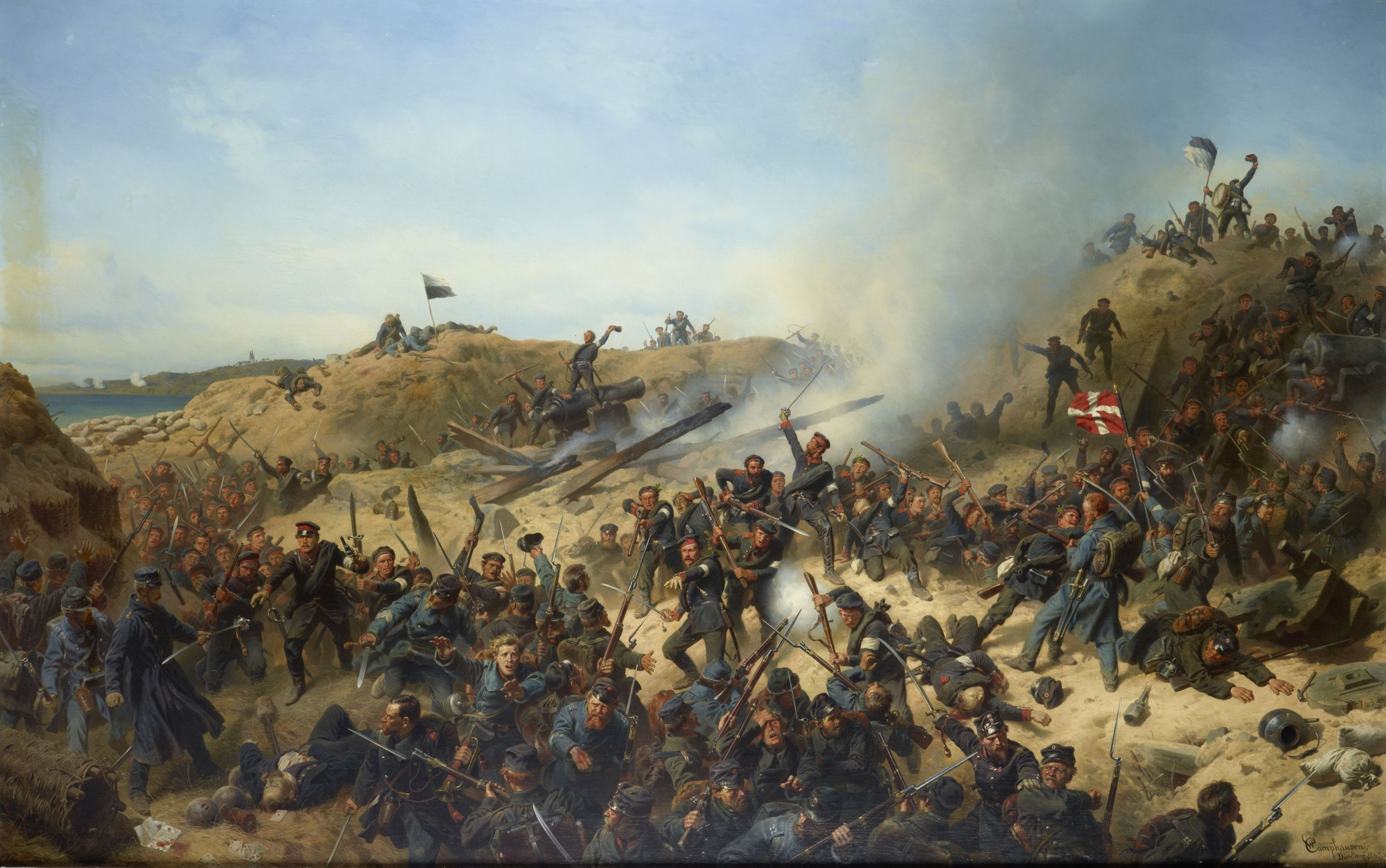
1864 painting of the Battle of Dybbøl by Wilhelm Camphausen

April

- 17 and 18 April – Denmark suffers a severe defeat to the German Confederation in the Battle of Dybbøl which effectively decides the war.

May

- 9 May – Denmark wins a tactical victory in the Battle of Heligoland but it has no impact on the outcome of the war.
- 12 May – A general armistice came into effect, Denmark has lost the war.

June

- 29 June – In the Battle of Als, the last major engagement of the war, the Prussians secure Als after a night attack masterminded by the Chief of Staff Leonhard Graf von Blumenthal.

July

- 3 July – The Battle of Lundby in north-eastern Himmerland results in great Danish losses. It becomes the last battle of the Second Schleswig War.
- 8 July – The Cabinet of Monrad is succeeded by the Cabinet of Bluhme.

October

- 30 October – The Second Schleswig War ends. The Duchies of Schleswig, Holstein and Lauenburg are ceded to Prussia.
- 18 October – HDMS Peder Skram is launched at Nyholm in Copenhagen.

== Births ==
=== January–March ===
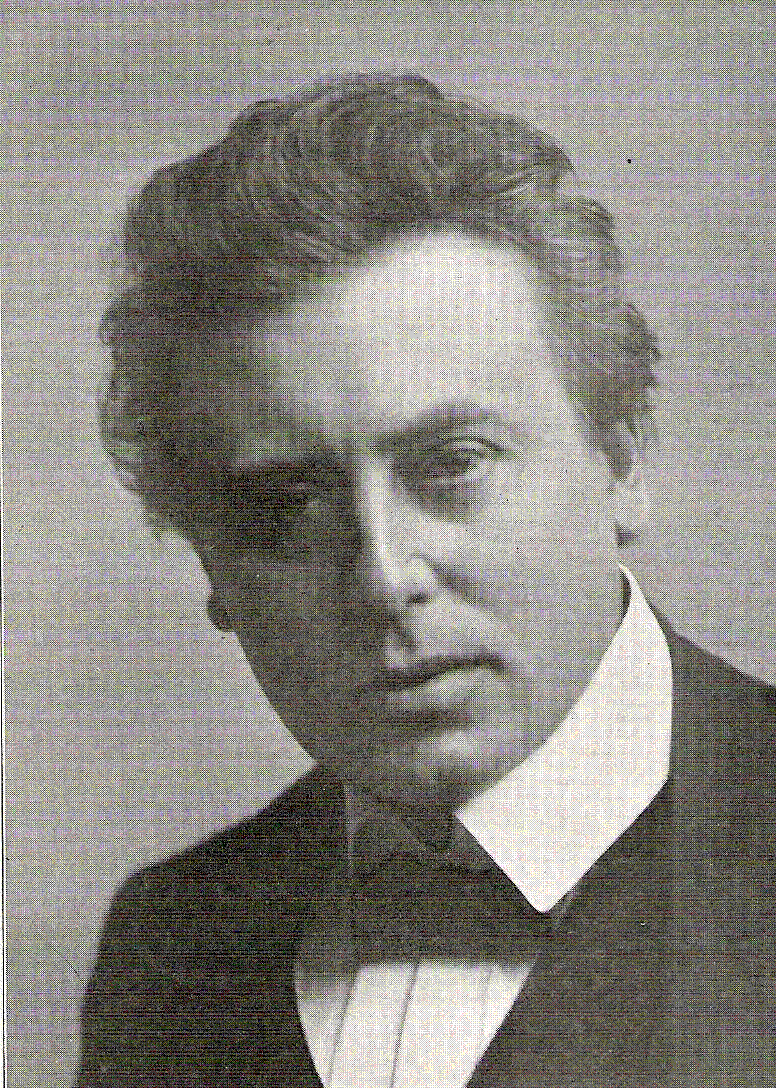
Louis Glass

- 9 February – August Hassel, sculptor (died 1942)
- 18 March – Carl Oluf Jensen, vetenarian (died 1934)

=== April–June ===
- 10 April – Clara Lachmann, Danish-Swedish patron of the arts (d. 1920)
- 6 May – Jens Christian Kofoed, architect (died 1941)
- 15 May – Vilhelm Hammershøi, painter (died 1916)
- 23 May – Louis Glass, composer (died 1936)
- 14 June – Niels Viggo Ussing, mineralogist (died 1911)

=== July–September ===
- 12 July – Carl Brummer, architect (died 1953)
- 16 August – Kristian Hude, photographer (died 1929)
- 1 September – Albert Edvard Wang , painter (died 1930)

=== October–December ===
- 16 October – Vilhelm Andersen, writer and historian (died 1953)
- 15 November – Sophus Falck, manufacturer and founder of Falck (died 1926)

== Deaths ==
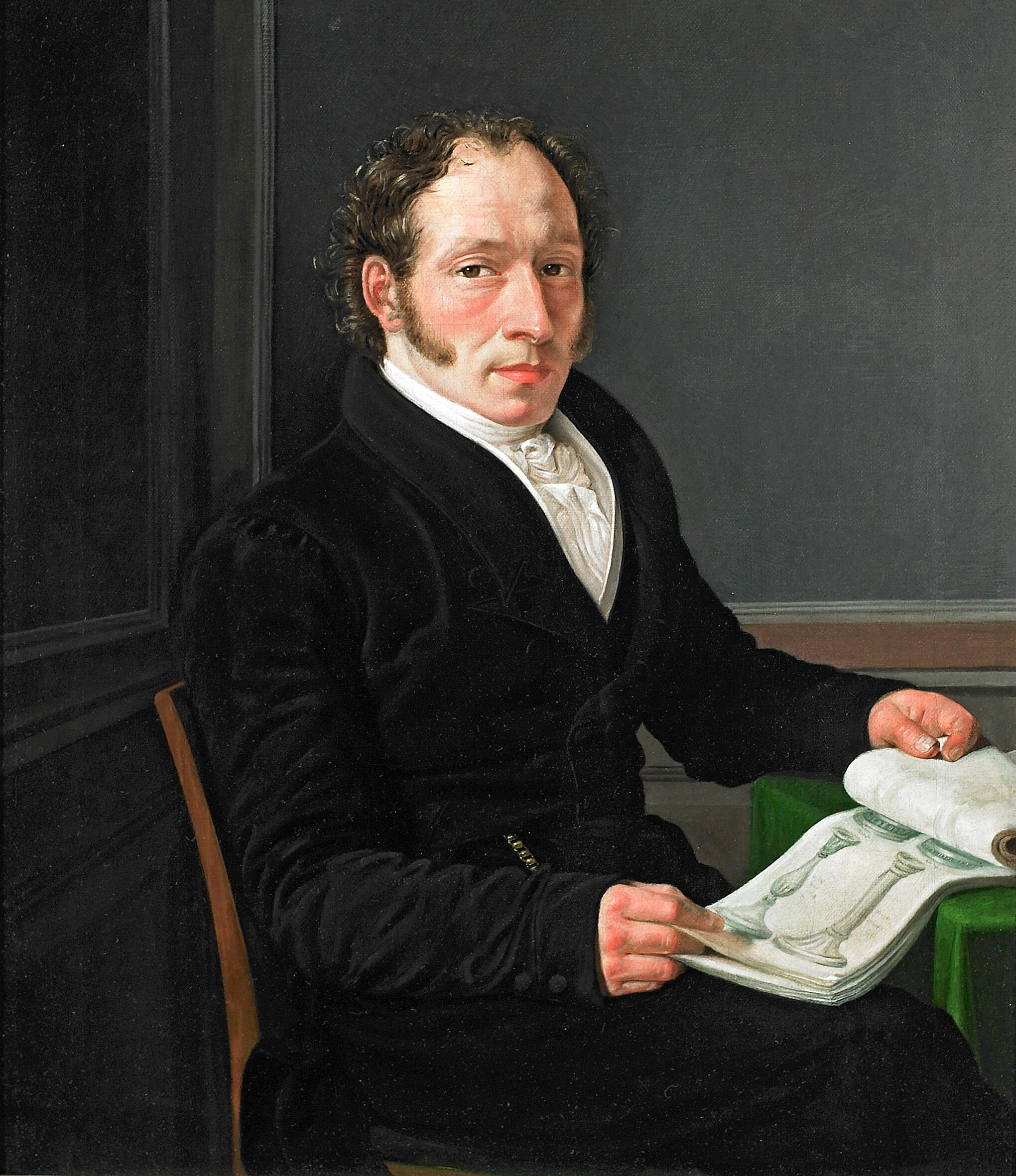
Gustav Friedrich Hetsch.

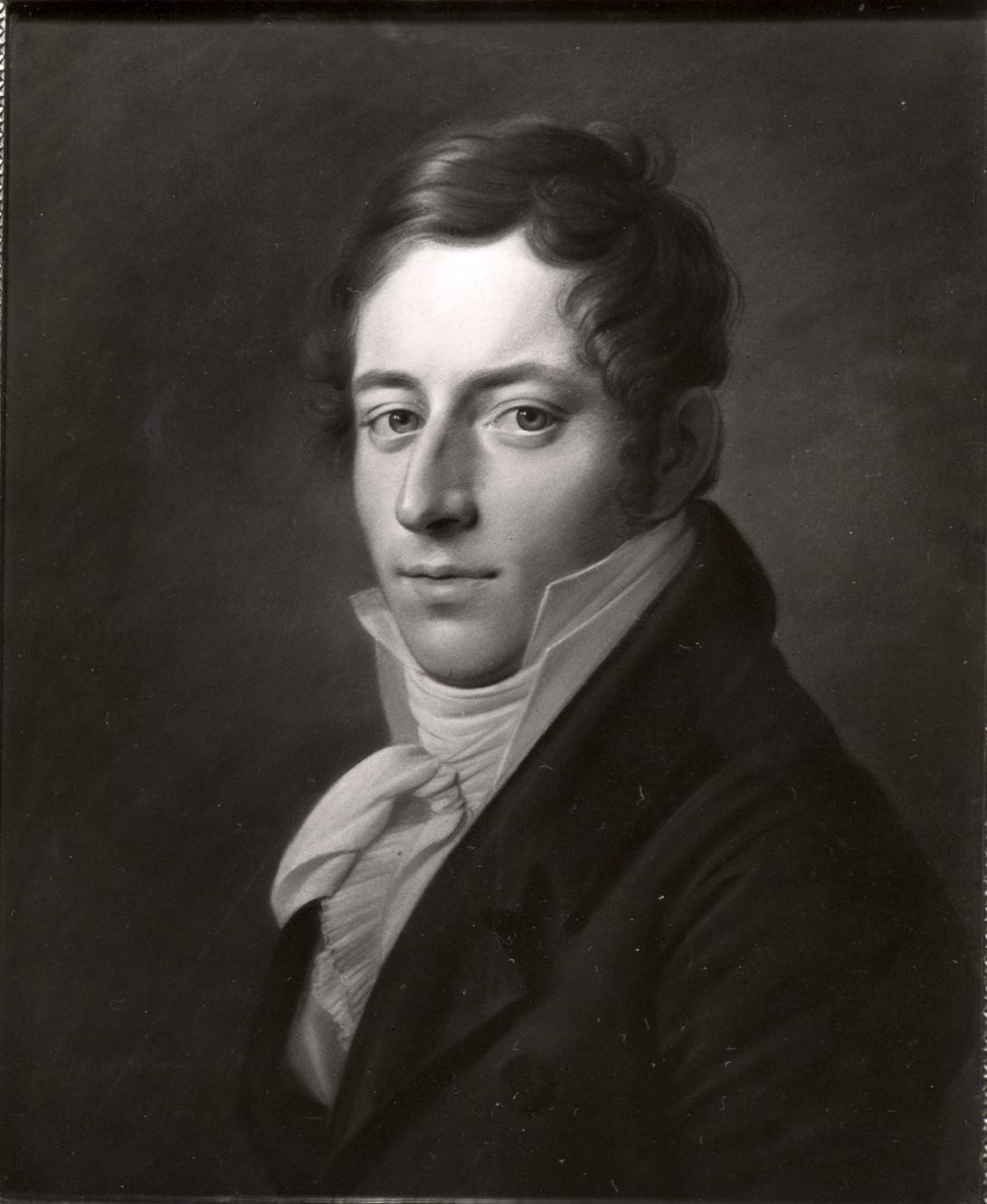
Peter Christian Knudtzon.

=== January–March ===
- 15 February – Adam Wilhelm Moltke, landowner and politician (born 1785)
- 28 March – Princess Louise Charlotte, princess of Denmark (born 1789)

=== April–June ===
- 7 June – Carl Heinrich Delcomyn, gunsmith (born 1800)

=== July–September ===
- 14 August – Christopher Puggaard, geologist (born 1823)
- 7 September - Gustav Friedrich Hetsch, architect (born 1788)
- 20 September – Caspar Peder Rothe Ingerslev, politician 18oo)

=== October–December ===
- 20 October – Carl Christian Rafn, historian, translator and antiquarian (born 1795)
- 17 November – Peter Christian Knudtzon, businessman (born 1789)
