= 2009 in Denmark =

- Decades: 1980s; 1990s; 2000s; 2010s; 2020s
- See also: Other events of 2009; List of years in Denmark

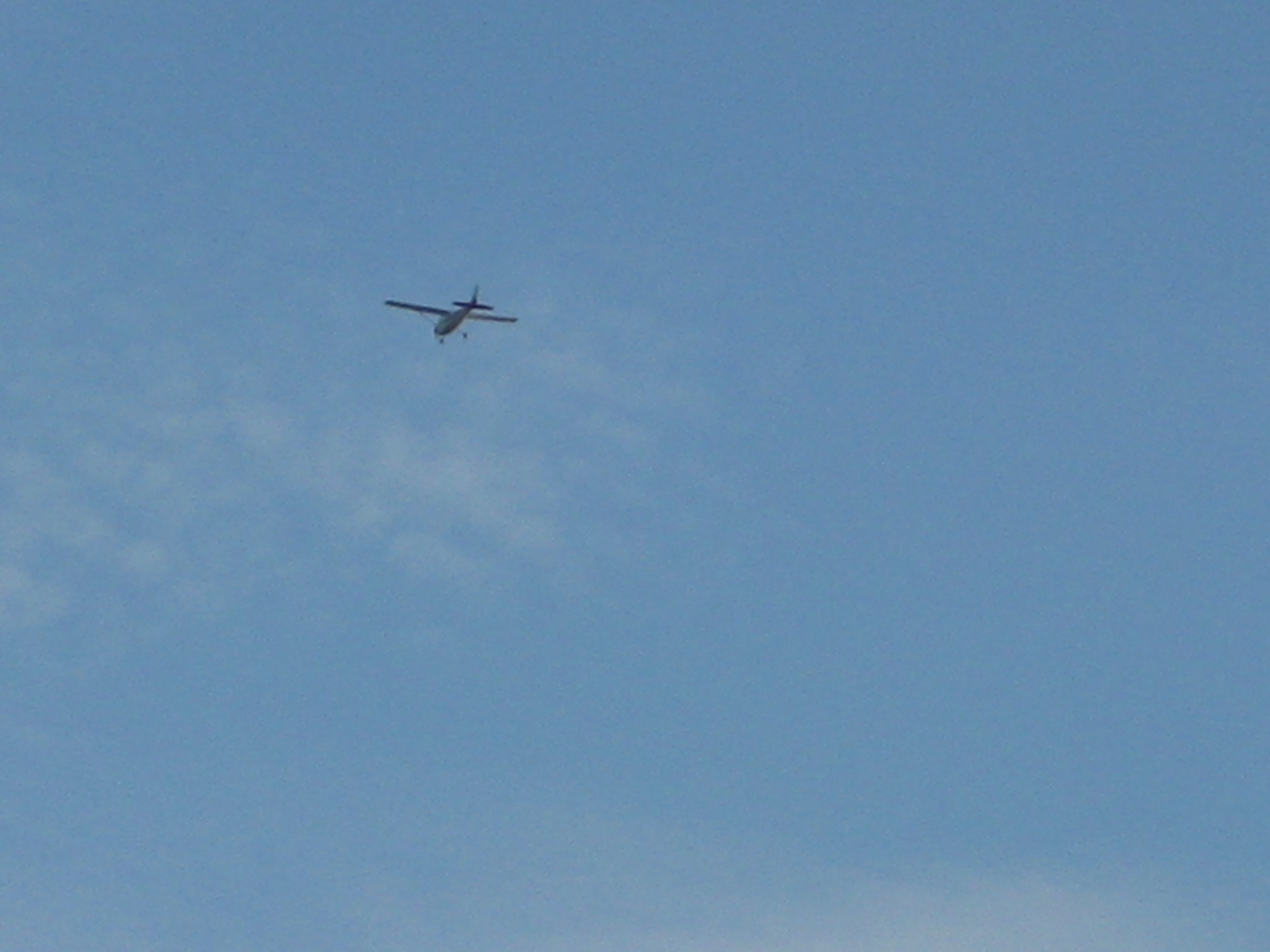
A small propeller plane against the blue sky over the Danish coast in June/July 2009.

Events from the year 2009 in Denmark.

== Incumbents ==
- Monarch – Margrethe II
- Prime Minister: Anders Fogh Rasmussen (until 5 April), Lars Løkke Rasmussen (starting 5 April)

== Events ==
=== January ===
- 16 January – Somali pirates release the Danish cargo ship CEC Future after receiving a ransom payment.
- 31 January – Niels Brinck wins Dansk Melodi Grand Prix 2009.

=== February ===
- 4 February – Intrusion by Russian aircraft into Danish airspace, requiring intervention from Danish fighter jets.
- 5 February – Asylum reopened in Ebeltoft and Grenå.
- 12 February – A Macedonian man is killed in Copenhagen.
- 16 February – China's Navy and Denmark's Navy rescue Italian and Chinese merchant vessels from Somali pirates in the Gulf of Aden.

=== March ===
- 27 March – The Faroese singer Linda Andrews wins the second season of X Faktor.

=== April ===
- 3–4 April – At the 21st NATO Summit, former Danish Prime Minister Anders Fogh Rasmussen is appointed as the new Secretary General of NATO.
- 8 April – Somali pirates hijack the Danish container ship MV Maersk Alabama in the Indian Ocean.

=== June ===
- 7 June – A referendum on changing the Act of Succession is held.
- 13 June – Stein Bagger is sentenced to 7 years in prison for having embezzled 862 million dollars.
- 17 June – Three Danish soldiers are killed in Afghanistan. Denmark has lost a total of 25 soldiers in the War in Afghanistan.
- 21 June – As a step toward total independence from the Kingdom of Denmark, Greenland assumes control over its law enforcement, judicial affairs, and natural resources. Greenlandic becomes the official language.

=== September ===
- 2 September – Twenty-two Iraqis, whose asylum requests have been rejected, are on their way out of the country.
- 13 September – In tennis, Kim Clijsters of Belgium defeats Caroline Wozniacki of Denmark to win the women's singles at the US Open.
- 24 September – Nine North Koreans enter Denmark's embassy in the Vietnamese capital Hanoi to seek political asylum.

=== October ===
- 2 October – The host city of the 2016 Summer Olympics will be announced at the 121st Session (which will also be the XIIIth Olympic Congress) of the International Olympic Committee to be held in Copenhagen.
- 20 October – Nine North Koreans who entered the Danish embassy in Hanoi, Vietnam, last month leave for South Korea.
- 29 October – Danish Prime Minister Lars Løkke Rasmussen says a deal at a UN climate change summit in December is unlikely.

=== November ===
- 15 November – APEC leaders say a deal on global warming will not be possible before next month's United Nations summit in Denmark.

=== December ===
- 7–18 December – The UNFCCC's United Nations Climate Change Conference 2009 conference is held in Copenhagen.
- 12 December – Police in Denmark detain 900 people after thousands gather in Copenhagen to demand more action on climate change and global warming by leaders at the United Nations Climate Change Conference.
- 15 December – U.N. Secretary-General Ban Ki-moon and Danish hosts urge countries on to compromise to salvage agreement on a new U.N. pact aimed at climate change mitigation.
- 16 December – Danish Prime Minister Lars Løkke Rasmussen replaces Connie Hedegaard in a "procedural move" as president of the U.N. climate talks, as further clashes take place around the perimeter of the summit.

== The arts ==
=== Architecture ===
- 21 May – The new Fuglsang Art Museum designed by Tony Fretton receives a 2000 RIBA European Award at the Royal Institute of British Architects' annual awards ceremony in London.
- 14 July – 3XN's Saxo Bank HQ receives a 2009 RIBA International Award at another ceremony in London.

=== Film ===
- 21 October – Lars von Trier's film Antichrist receives the 2009 Nordic Council Film Prize.

=== Media ===
- 1 November – DR launches DR K and DR Ramasjang.
- 23 November – DR series The Protectors wins the Emmy Award for Best Drama Series at the 37th International Emmy Awards.

=== Music ===
- 3 March – Judas Priest performs in Horsens.
- 14 March – Red Warszawa performs in Lyngby.
- 10 June – Premiere performance of Frederik Magle's symphonic suite Cantabile in Koncerthuset, Copenhagen.
- 20–27 July – Metallica performs four concerts in Forum, Copenhagen.
- 11 August – Madonna performs in Parken Stadium.

== Sports ==
Badminton

- 13–19 – At the 2009 Korea Open Super Series, Peter Gade wins gold in Men's Single, Tine Baun wins gold in Women's Single and Mathias Boe and Carsten Mogensen win gold in Men's Double.
- February – Denmark wins gold at the European Mixed Team Badminton Championships after defeating England in the final.
- 10–16 August – Denmark wins one gold medal and one bronze medal at the 2009 BWF World Championships.

=== Cycling ===
- 3 February – Michael Mørkøv (DEN) and Alex Rasmussen (DEN) win the Six Days of Copenhagen six-day track cycling race.
- 25–29 March – Denmark wins two gold medals in Men's team pursuit and Men's Madison and a silver medal in the Men's points race at the 2009 UCI Track Cycling World Championships.
- 16 July – In cycling, Nicki Sørensen wins the 12th stage in the 2009 Tour de France.

=== Football ===
- 21 May – FC Copenhagen wins the 2008–09 Danish Cup by defeating AAB 1–0 in the final.
- 6 June – Denmark defeats Sweden 1–0 away in Group 1 of the 2010 FIFA World Cup qualification.
- 5 September – Denmark draws with Portugal in Group 1 of the World Cup qualification.
- 10 October – Denmark achieves another 1–0 victory over Sweden, this time on home ground, in Group 1 of the World Cup qualification and is now sure of winning Group 1 and thus qualifying directly for the 2010 FIFA World Cup in South Africa.

=== Handball ===
- 1 February – Denmark comes in fourth place in the 2009 World Men's Handball Championship after being defeated by Poland in the bronze match.

=== Golf ===
- 11 January – Anders Hansen wins Joburg Open on the 2009 European Tour.
- 29 March – Søren Kjeldsen wins the Open de Andalucia on the 2009 European Tour and becomes Golfer of the Month.
- 7 June – Golfer Jeppe Huldahl wins the Wales Open on the 2009 European Tour.

=== Other ===
- 20 September – Michael Maze wins gold in men's singles at the 2009 Table Tennis European Championship after defeating Werner Schlager of Austria.
- 21–27 September – The 2009 World Wrestling Championshipstakes place in Herning.
  - 25 September – Hålon Nyblom wins a bronze medal in Greco-Roman 55 kg.
  - 27 September – Mark Madsen wins a silver medal in Men's Greco-Roman 74 kg.
- 10–13 December – Denmark wins 2 gold medals, 1 silver medal and 8 bronze medals at the 2009 European Short Course Swimming Championships in Istanbul, Turkey.

== Births ==
- 4 May – Count Henrik

== Deaths ==
=== January–March ===
- 1 January – Gert Petersen, politician (b. 1927)
- 2 January – Inger Christensen, poet (b. 1935)
- 21 January – Finn Kobberø, badminton player (b. 1936)
- 24 January – Palle Jacobsen, ballet dancer (b. 1940)
- 13 February – Lis Hartel, equestrian athlete (b. 1921)
- 22 February – Erik Haunstrup Clemmensen, politician (born 1920)
- 3 March
  - Ole Brask, photographer (born 1935)
  - Flemming Flindt, ballet dancer and choreographer (born 1936)
- 24 March – Ebbe Lundgaard, politician (born 1944)

=== April–June ===
- 11 April – Gerda Gilboe, actress and singer (b. 1914)
- 21 May – Lilly Brændgaard, fashion designer (born 1918)
- 8 June – Aage Rou Jensen, footballer (b. 1924)
- 10 June – Helle Virkner, actress and Danish First Lady (b. 1925)

=== July–September ===
- 9 July – Karen Harup, swimmer (born 1924)
- 4 August – Svend Auken, politician (b. 1943)
- 22 August – Jørgen Boberg, painter and illustrator (born 1940)
- 8 September – Aage Bohr, nuclear physicist and Nobel Prize laureate (b. 1922)
- 19 September – Willy Breinholst, writer (b. 1918)

=== October–December ===
- 7 October – Poul Anker Bech, painter (b. 1942)
- 26 November – Lis Løwert, actress (b. 1919)
- 27 December – Arne Vodder, furniture designer (b. 1926)

== See also ==
- 2009 in Danish television
