= 1942 in Denmark =

- Decades: 1920s; 1930s; 1940s; 1950s; 1960s
- See also: Other events of 1942; List of years in Denmark

Events from the year 1942 in Denmark.

== Incumbents ==
- Monarch – Christian X
- Prime minister – Thorvald Stauning (until 4 May), Vilhelm Buhl (until 9 November), Erik Scavenius

== Events ==
- 4 May – Vilhelm Buhl is appointed to new prime minister of Denmark following Thorvald Stauning's death the previous day.
- 11 September – Sabotage results in a fire at the German Reichdeutsche Schulen in Emdrup, Copenhagen.
- 26 September – Sabotage against Adler Auto Service at Lyngbyvej 26 in Copenhagen.
- 19 October – Christian X is severely injured when he falls off his horse at Esplanaden on his morning ride.
- 28 October – Beginning of the Telegram Crisis.
- 5 November – Werner Best is appointed the Third Reich's Plenipotentiary (Reichsbevollmächtigter) in Denmark.
- 27 November – The Danish Outdoor Council is founded

== Sports ==
- B 93 wins their 8th Danish football championship by winning their 1941–42 Danish War Tournament.

== Births ==
=== January–March ===
- 14 January – Britt Bendixen, dance instructor and TV personality (died 2023)
- 9 February – Kirsten Thorup, author

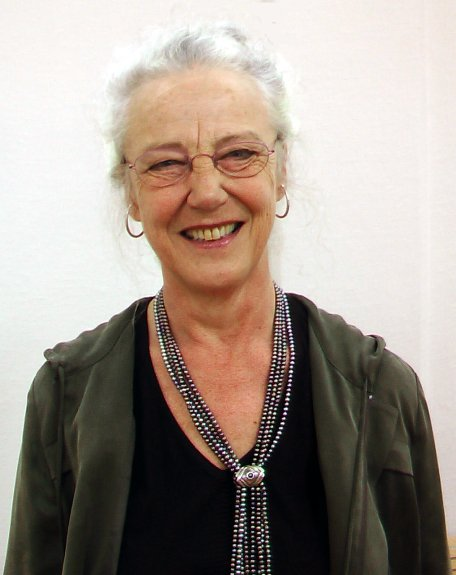
Jytte Hilden

- 18 February – Kirsten Jacobsen, politician (died 2010)
- 19 March – Jytte Rex, artist, author and film director

=== April–June ===
- 13 April – Poul Anker Bech, painter (died 2009)
- 19 May – Flemming Quist Møller, writer and illustrator (died 2022)
- 15 June – Birgitte Alsted, violinist, teacher and composer

=== July–September ===
- 27 August – Per Stig Møller, politician, writer
- 12 September – Jytte Hilden, chemical engineer and politician.

=== October–December ===
- 29 October – Vita Andersen, poet, novelist, playwright and children's writer (died 2021).

== Deaths ==
=== January–March ===
- 10 January – Alba Schwartz, author and novelist (born 1857)
- 20 March – Aksel Agerby, composer, organist, and music administrator (born 1889)
- 30 March – H. A. Brendekilde, sculptor (born 1857)

=== April–June ===
- 2 April – Peter Esben-Petersen, entomologist (born 1869)
- 10 April – Carl Schenstrøm, actor (born 1881)
- 3 May – Thorvald Stauning, politician, Prime Minister of Denmark (born 1873)
- 30 May – August Hassel, sculptor (born 1864)

=== July–September ===
- 23 July – Valdemar Poulsen, engineer who developed a magnetic wire recorder (born 1869)

=== October–December ===
- 22 October – Olga Svendsen, actor (born 1882)
- 24 November – Carl Christensen, botanist (born 1872)
- 12 December – Benedict Nordentoft, educator and cleric, co-founder of a Danish community with a Lutheran church and a folk high school in Solvang, California (born 1873)
- 14 December – Viggo Brøndal, philologist (born 1887)
