= 1934–35 Danish Championship League =

Danish Championship League
- Season: 1934–35
- Champions: Boldklubben af 1893

Following are the statistics of the Danish Championship League in the 1934–35 season.

== Overview ==
It was contested by 10 teams, and Boldklubben af 1893 won the championship.

== League standings ==
Pos	Team	Pld	W	D	L	GF	GA	GD	Pts
1	Boldklubben af 1893	9	6	1	2	26	13	+13	13
2	Boldklubben Frem	9	5	2	2	28	16	+12	12
3	Kjøbenhavns Boldklub	9	5	2	2	22	14	+8	12
4	Akademisk Boldklub	9	4	3	2	28	23	+5	11
5	Esbjerg fB	9	5	0	4	18	19	−1	10
6	Aarhus Gymnastikforening	9	4	1	4	33	23	+10	9
7	Boldklubben 1903	9	3	2	4	15	15	0	8
8	Helsingør IF	9	2	2	5	16	27	−11	6
9	Aalborg Boldspilklub	9	2	1	6	17	21	−4	5
10	Fremad Amager	9	1	2	6	7	39	−32	4
