= 1935–36 Danish Championship League =

Danish Championship League
- Season: 1935–36
- Champions: Boldklubben Frem

Following are the statistics of the Danish Championship League in the 1935–36 season.

== Overview ==
It was contested by 10 teams, and Boldklubben Frem won the championship.

== League standings ==
Pos	Team	Pld	W	D	L	GF	GA	GD	Pts
1	Boldklubben Frem	9	7	1	1	36	15	+21	15
2	Akademisk Boldklub	9	7	1	1	29	14	+15	15
3	Aalborg Boldspilklub	9	4	2	3	25	16	+9	10
4	Aarhus Gymnastikforening	9	4	2	3	20	22	−2	10
5	Boldklubben 1903	9	4	1	4	33	32	+1	9
6	Kjøbenhavns Boldklub	9	3	2	4	28	25	+3	8
7	Boldklubben af 1893	9	3	2	4	18	23	−5	8
8	Esbjerg fB	9	2	2	5	17	22	−5	6
9	Helsingør IF	9	2	2	5	12	28	−16	6
10	Næstved BK	9	1	1	7	9	30	−21	3
