= Marianne Grøndahl =

Danish photographer

Marianne Hoppe Grøndahl
- Marianne Grøndahl, photograph by Thomas Grøndahl
- Born: 1938; Stege, Denmark
- Died: 2012 (aged 73–74)
- Known for: Photography

Marianne Hoppe Grøndahl (27 November 1938 – 19 March 2012) was a Danish photographer. Trained in publicity and press photography, she worked in both the theatrical environment and as a documentary photographer, remembered for her images of Jordan.

Born in Stege, she started photographing at the age of 10. She trained as a publicity photographer in 1957. Her many photobooks present images of the Royal Danish Ballet and of the music and film environment. From 1980 to 1999, she documented the Odense Teater, Café Teatret, Folketeatret and the Royal Danish Theatre. Her last book, documenting the homeless citizens of Odense was published in 2011.

== Selected books ==
- Aschengreen, Erik; Andersen, Frank (1986). Marianne Grøndahl: ballettens børn: Det Kongelige Teaters Balletskole. Per Kofod.
- Grøndahl, Marianne; Tarnø, Henrik; Jacobsen, Jens Christian (2007). Det danske folkestyre : Christiansborg. Gyldendal A/S. ISBN 978-87-02-06279-3.
- Grøndahl, Marianne; Rostrup, Kaspar (1999). Nærhed: billeder om en films tilblivelse. Viva. ISBN 978-87-7883-078-4.
- Grøndahl, Marianne (1994). Positioner: den Kongelige Danske ballet 1980-94. Gyldendal. ISBN 978-87-00-18916-4.
- Grøndahl, Marianne (2011). Udstødt. Gyldendal. ISBN 978-87-02-11468-3
