= Ole Brask =

Danish photographer (1935–2009)

- Born: Ole Brask; April 4, 1935
- Died: March 23, 2009 (aged 73)
- Known for: Jazz photography
- Website: Ben Webster Foundation

Ole Brask (April 4, 1935 – March 23, 2009) was a Danish photographer who specialized in jazz photography. There are two published collections of his work; Jazz People published in 1976 by H. N. Abrams, New York City and Ole Brask Photographs Jazz published in 1995 by Nieswand Verlag Germany.
