= 1868 in Denmark =

- Decades: 1840s; 1850s; 1860s; 1870s; 1880s
- See also: Other events of 1868; List of years in Denmark

Events from the year 1868 in Denmark.

== Incumbents ==
- Monarch – Christian IX
- Prime minister – C. E. Frijs

== Events ==
- 9 January – The 1868 Danish West Indies status referendum takes place.
- 15 January – Lucie Ingemannm painter (born 1792)
- 24 April – The Port of Esbjerg construction act provides for the construction of a new export port at Esbjerg, until then a tiny community, as a replacement for the harbour in Altona, which had previously been Denmark's most important North Sea harbour.
- 7 August – The Roman Catholic Diocese of Copenhagen is established.
- 8 August – HDMS Lindormen is launched at Nyholm in Copenhagen.
- 4 October – The Fredericia–Aarhus railway line is inaugurated.
- 16 October – All Danish rights to the Nicobar Islands, which since 1848 had been gradually abandoned, are sold to the British as the last remains of Danish India.

=== Undated ===
- Magasin du Nord is established in Aarhus as Emil Vett & Co. by Theodor Wessel and Emil Vett.

== Births ==
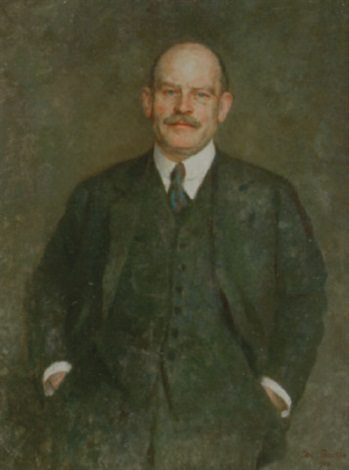
Wilhelm Hansen.

=== January–March ===
- 7 January – Johannes Wilhjelm, painter (died 1938)
- 9 January – S. P. L. Sørensen, chemist (died 1939)
- 26 January – Vilhelm Fischer, architect (died 1914)
- 2 February – Anna Bloch, actress (died 1953)

=== April–June ===
- 14 April – Gerda Madvig, painter and sculptor (died 1940)
- 13 May – Peter Hansen, painter (d. 1928)
- 25 April – Carl Wentorf, artist (d. 1914)
- 26 May – Carl Johan Bonnesen, sculptor (d. 1933)
- 31 May – Sigrid Neiiendam, actress (died 1055)

=== July–September ===
- 17 july – Henri Nathansen, writer and stage director (d. 1944)
- 10 September – Jens Christian Johansen, engineer (died 1929 in Estonia)

=== October–December ===
- 25 October – Rasmus Harboe, sculptor (d. 1952)
- 27 November – Wilhelm Hansen, businessman and art collector (died 1936)

== Deaths ==
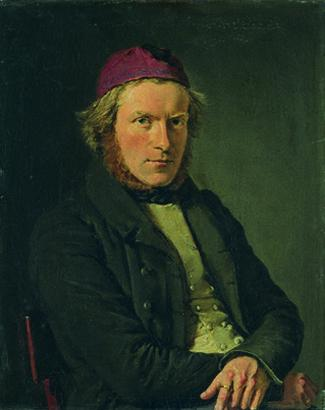
Herman Wilhelm Bissen.

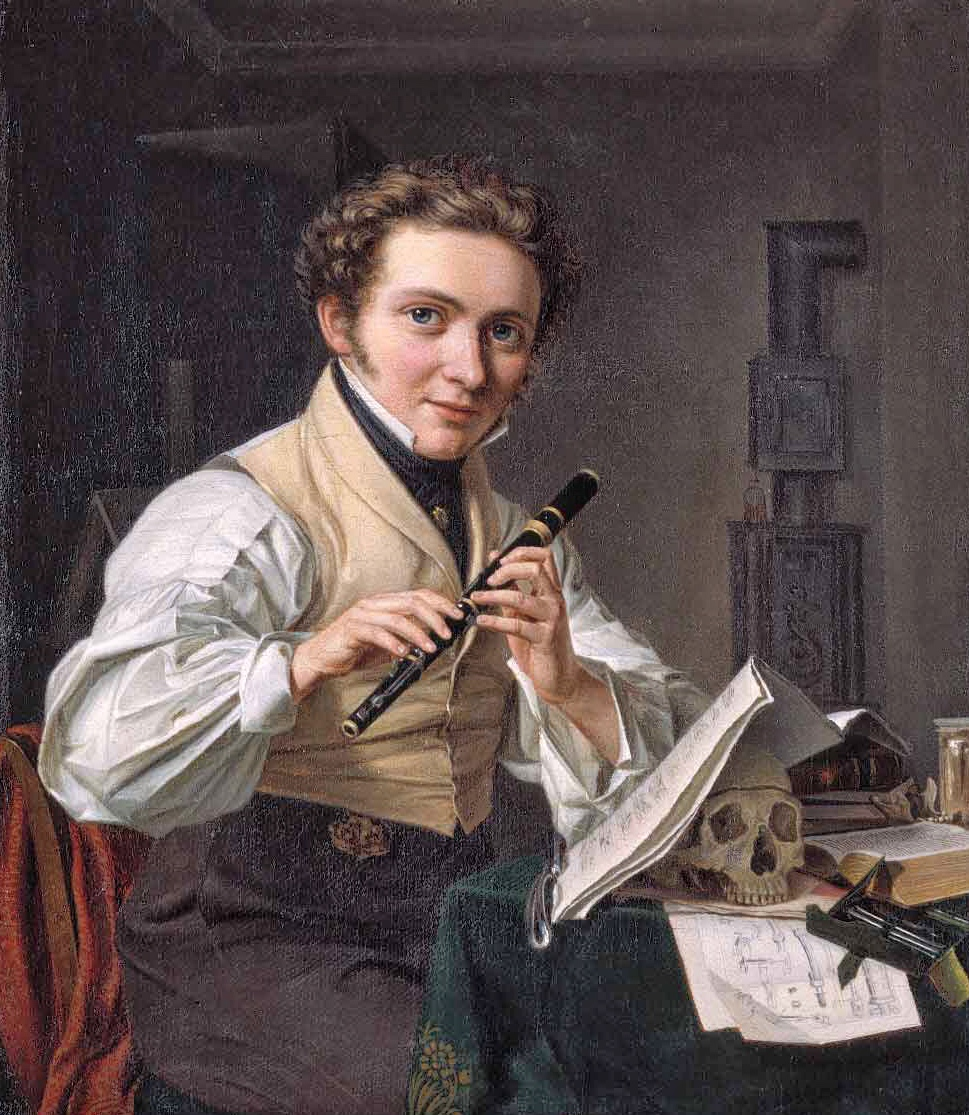
Emil Bærentzen.

=== January –March ===
- 16 January – Christopher Bagnæs Hansen, furniture maker (b. 1806)
- 8 March – Axel Kittendorff, lithographer (born 1721)
- 10 March – Bernt Wilhelm Westermann, businessman and collector (born 1781)
- 10 March
  - Herman Wilhelm Bissen, sculptor (b. 1798)
  - Bernt Wilhelm Westermann, businessman (b. 1781)

=== April–June ===
- 14 May – Sophus August Wilhelm Stein, pyusician (born 1797)

=== October–December ===
- 14 October – Emil Bærentzen, painter (born 1799)
- 15 July – Georgia Schouw-Skovgaard, embroiderer (born 1828)
