= 1870 in Denmark =

- Decades: 1850s; 1860s; 1870s; 1880s; 1890s
- See also: Other events of 1870; List of years in Denmark

Events from the year 1870 in Denmark.

== Incumbents ==
- Monarch – Christian IX
- Prime minister – C. E. Frijs (until 28 May), Ludvig Holstein-Holsteinborg

== Events ==
- 17 May – The turreted ironclad Gorm is launched from the Naval Dockyard in Copenhagen.
- 28 May – Prime Minister C. E. Frijs resigns, and is replaced by Ludvig Holstein-Holsteinborg.
- 26 September – Prince Christian, the future King Christian X, is born to Crown Prince Frederick and Crown Princess Louise.
- September/October – The literary fairy tale "The Most Incredible Thing", by poet and author Hans Christian Andersen, is published in the United States and Denmark.
- 4 October – The railway line South Line (Sydbanen), between Roskilde and Vordingborg by way of Køge and Næstved, is opened.
- 2 November – The Vestre Cemetery in Copenhagen is opened.

=== Date unknown ===
- The Hansen Writing Ball is first patented and entered into production.
- Rosenfeldt Manor, just west of Vordingborg, is completed.
- Sundby Church in Copenhagen is completed.
- The political party Venstre is founded.

== Births ==
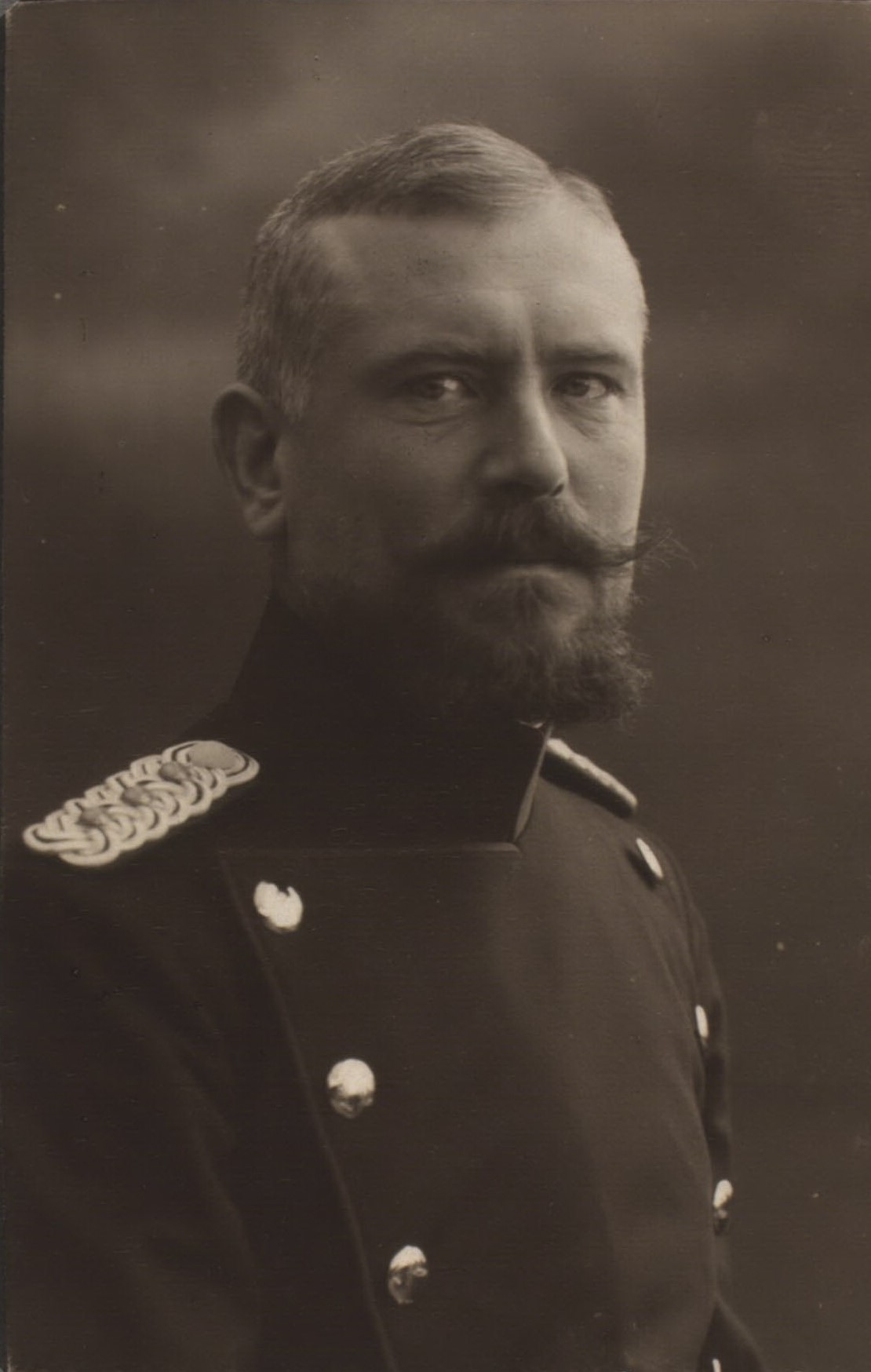
Johan Peter Koch.

=== January–March ===
- 7 January – Anna Syberg, painter, one of the "Funen Painters" (died 1914)
- 15 January – Johan Peter Koch, captain and arctic explorer (died 1928)
- 18 February
  - August Busck, Danish-American entomologist and author of works on microlepidoptera (died 1944)
  - Thorvald Madsen, physician and bacteriologist (died 1957)
- 1 March – Gerda Christophersen, actress and director (died 1947)
- 9 April

=== April–June ===
- 9 April
  - Arild Rosenkrantz, nobleman, painter, sculptor, stained-glass artist and illustrator (died 1964)
  - Albrecht Schmidt, film actor (died 1945)
- 30 April – Peter Rochegune Munch, historian and politician (died 1948)
- 24 July – Holger Damgaard, Denmark's first press photographer (died 1945)

=== July–September ===
- 25 July – Peter Rochegune Munch, historian and politician, served in three governments between 1909 and 1940 (died 1948)
- 28 July – Michael Agerskov, spiritualist teacher and author (died 1933)
- 3 August – Peter Jörgensen, entomologist and teacher, active in Argentina and Paraguay (died 1937)
- 24 August – Frederik Torm, theologian (died 1959)
- 26 September – Prince Christian, the future King Christian X (died 1947)

=== October–December ===
- 16 October – Helge Rode, writer, critic and journalist (died 1937)
- 25 November – Petrine Sonne, stage and film actress (died 1946)
- 18 December – Anders Randolf, Danish-American actor during the silent film era (died 1930)

== Deaths ==
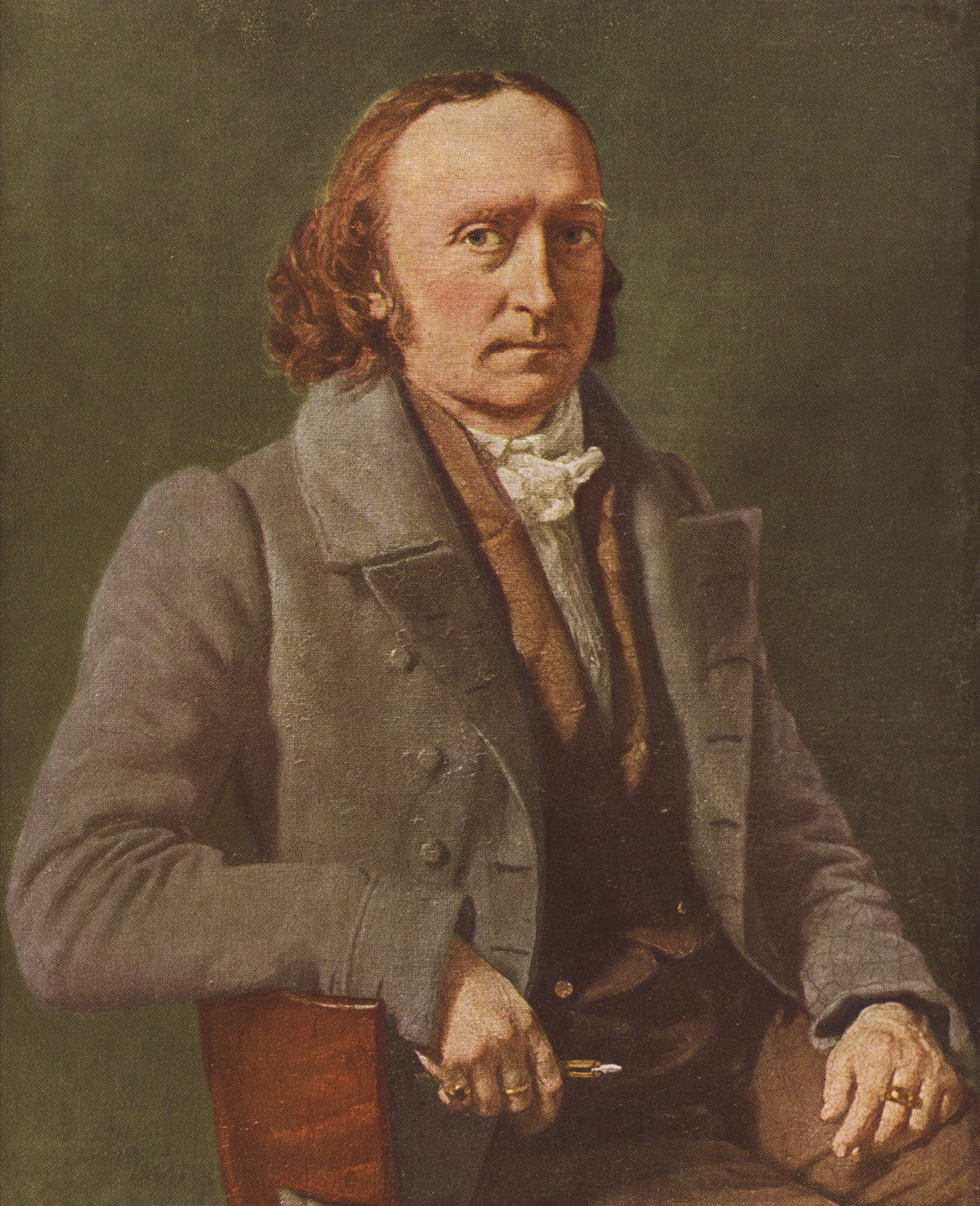
Christian Albrecht Jensen.

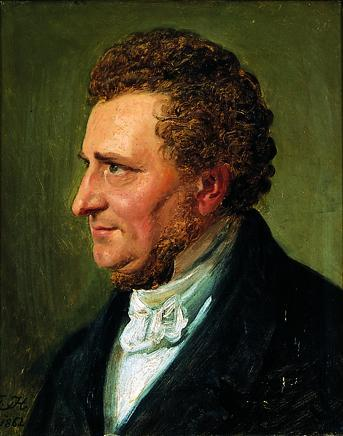
Orla Lehmann.

=== January–March ===
- 27 January – Johannes Flintoe, painter of landscapes and scenes from Scandinavian history (born 1787)
- 25 February – Henrik Hertz, poet during the Danish Golden Age (born 1797)

=== April–June ===
- 6 April – Christen Mikkelsen Kold, teacher who founded a school in Ryslinge, which later became a model for the Danish folk high-school system (born 1816)
- 13 April – Mathias Lüttichau, Danish Minister of War (born 1795)
- 29 April – Niels Laurits Høyen, art historian (Denmark's first) and critic (born 1798)
- 29 May – Emil Horneman, composer and art and music tradesman (born 1809)

=== July–September ===
- 11 July – Cosmus Bræstrup, chief of police (born 1789)
- 13 July – Christian Albrecht Jensen, portrait painter during the Danish Golden Age (born 1792)
- 28 August – Søren Hjorth, railway pioneer and inventor (born 1801)
- 13 September – Orla Lehmann, statesman and key figure in the development of Denmark's parliamentary government (born 1810)

=== October–December ===
- 14 November – Henrik Nikolai Krøyer, zoologist and zoology teacher and textbook author (born 1799)
- 30 November – Poul Pagh, merchant and shipowner (born 1796)
- 5 December – Herman Severin Løvenskiold (born 1815)
