= 1795 in Denmark =

- Decades: 1770s; 1780s; 1790s; 1800s; 1810s
- See also: Other events of 1795; List of years in Denmark

Events from the year 1795 in Denmark.

== Incumbents ==
- Monarch – Christian VII
- Prime minister – Andreas Peter Bernstorff

== Events ==
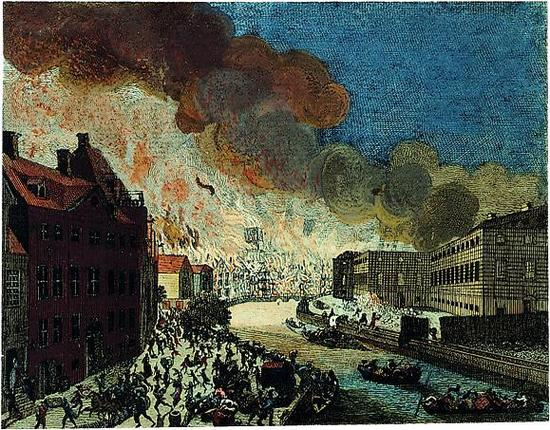
The Great Fire at Gammel Strand

June

- 5 June – The Copenhagen Fire of 1795 breaks out around 3 p.m. at the Navy’s old base at Gammelholm.

July

- 7 June – The fire dies out around 4 p.m. It has destroyed 941 houses and made homeless around 6,000 residents.

=== Undated ===
- The Leda and the Swan statue in Copenhagen Harbour is dismantled.

== Births ==
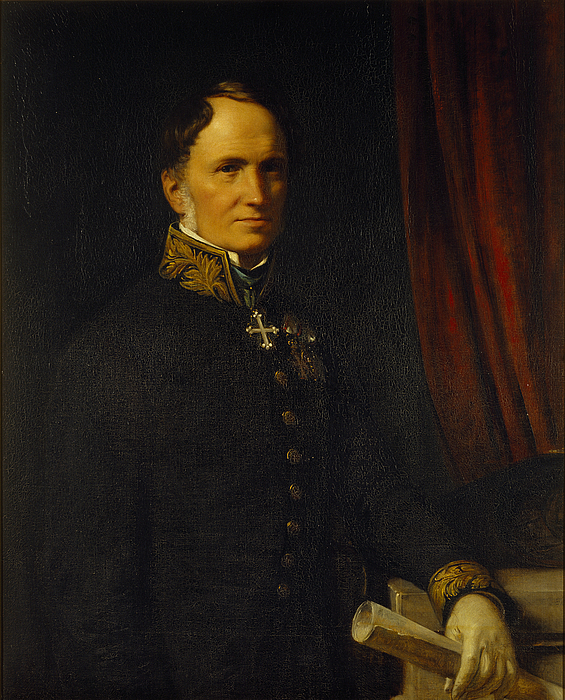
Just Mathias Thiele.

- 16 January – Carl Christian Rafn, historian, translator and antiquarian (died 1864)
- 4 May - Annestine Beyer, reform pedagogue and pioneer on women's education (died 1884)
- 17 June– Gotthold Müller, army officer (died 1882)
- 30 August – Poul Sporon, lawyer (died 1854)
- 8 December – Peter Andreas Hansen, astronomer, Copley Medal recipient in 1850 (died 1874)
- 9 December – Mathias Lüttichau, Danish Minister of War (died 1870)
- 13 December – Just Mathias Thiele, writer and art historian (died 1874)
- 31 December – Carl Peter Holbøll, naval officer and Greenland explorer (died 1856)

== Deaths ==
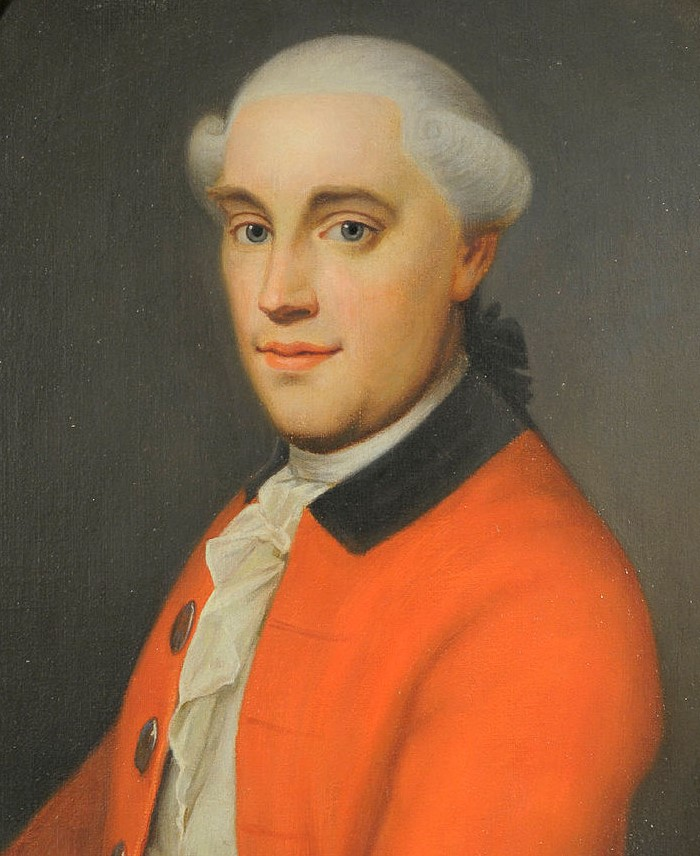
Niels Lunde Reiersen.

- 3 January – Hans Næss, architect (born 1723)
- 20 July – Niels Lunde Reiersen, government official businessman (born 1742)
- 17 August – Friderich Christian Hager, governor of the Danish Gold Coast (born 1756)
- Caroline von Schimmelmann, favorite (born 1730)
- 6 July – Christian Gottlieb Kratzenstein, physician, physicist and engineer (born 1723)
