= 1797 in Denmark =

- Decades: 1770s; 1780s; 1790s; 1800s; 1810s
- See also: Other events of 1797; List of years in Denmark

Events from the year 1797 in Denmark.

== Incumbents ==
- Monarch – Christian VII
- Prime minister – Andreas Peter Bernstorff (until 21 June), Christian Günther von Bernstorff

== Events ==
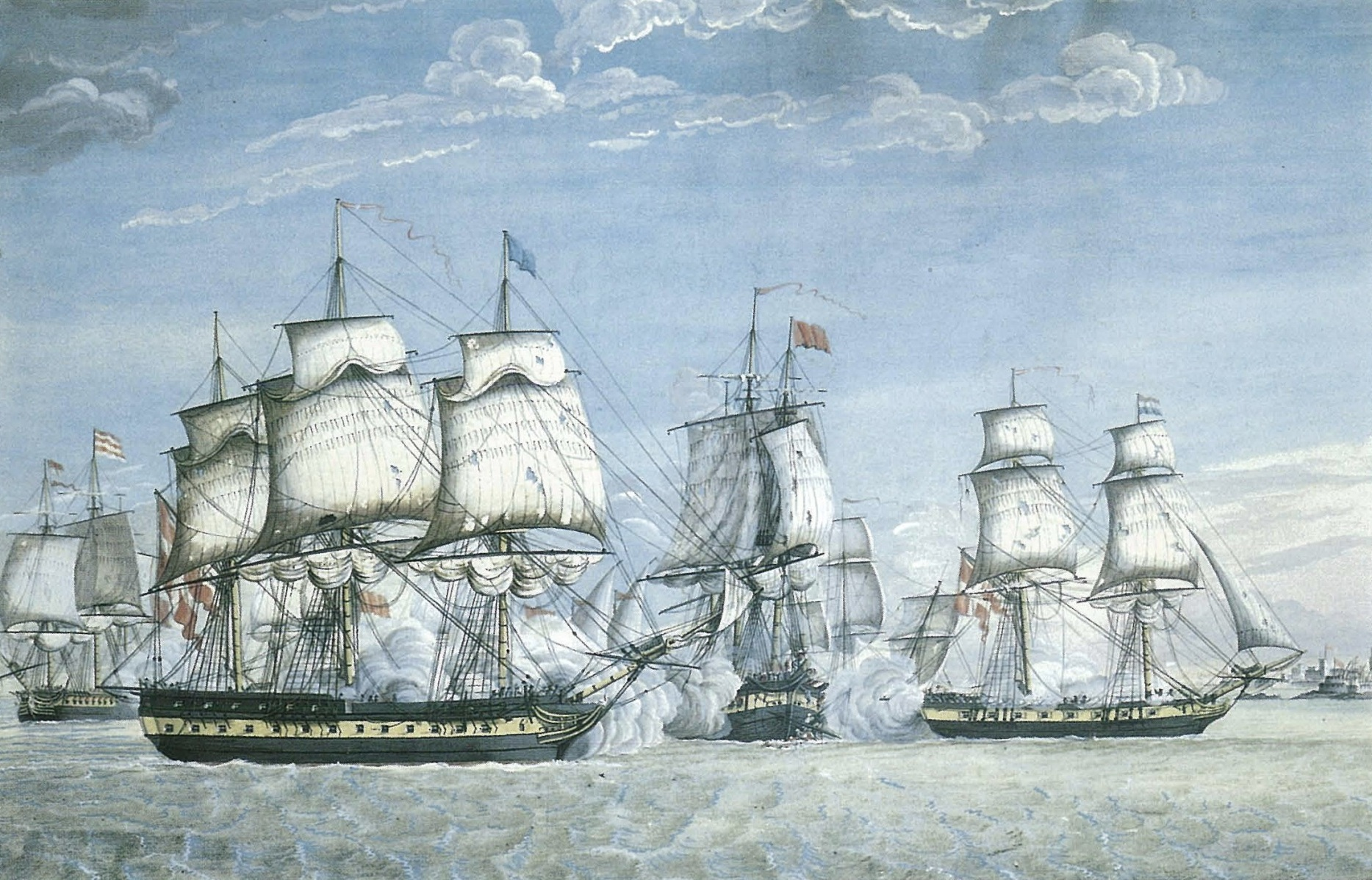
16 May: action of 16 May 1797

March

- 1 March – Kreditkassen for Husejere i Kjøbenhavn is founded by royal resolution.

May

- 16 May – HDMS Najaden in battle with local ships off Tripoli.
- 21 June – Prime Minister Andreas Peter Bernstorff dies, and is replaced by his son, Christian Günther von Bernstorff.

July

- 5 July – Christian Ditlev Frederik, Count of Reventlow, is appointed to Minister of the State.

== Culture ==
=== Art ===
- Jens Juel paints Niels Ryberg with his Son Johan Christian and his Daughter-in-Law Engelke, née Falbe.
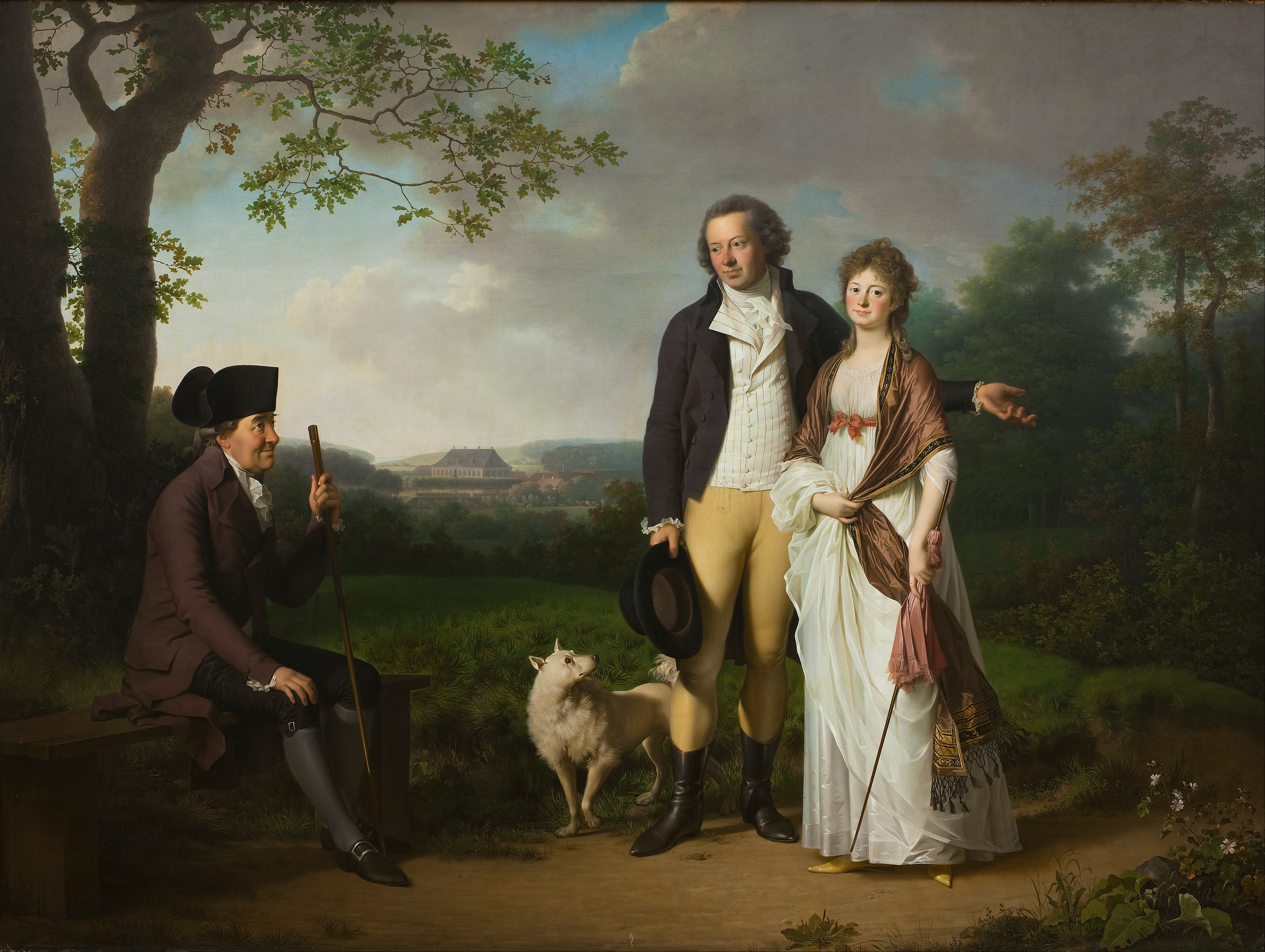
Juel's Ruberg family portrait.

== Births ==
- 1 May – Ernst Meyer, politician (died 1751)
- 22 May – Eleonora Zrza, opera soprano (died 1862)
- 20 June – Georg Frederik Ursin, mathematician and astronomer (died 1849)
- 29 July – Sophus August Wilhelm Stein, physician (died 1868)
- 7 October – Peter Georg Bang, politician and jurist, prime minister of Denmark (died 1861)
- 20 August – Johan Frederik Møller, painter and photographer (died 1871)
- 25 August – Henrik Hertz, poet during the Danish Golden Age (died 1870)

== Deaths ==
- 2 January – Adolph Sigfried von der Osten, diplomat (born 1726)

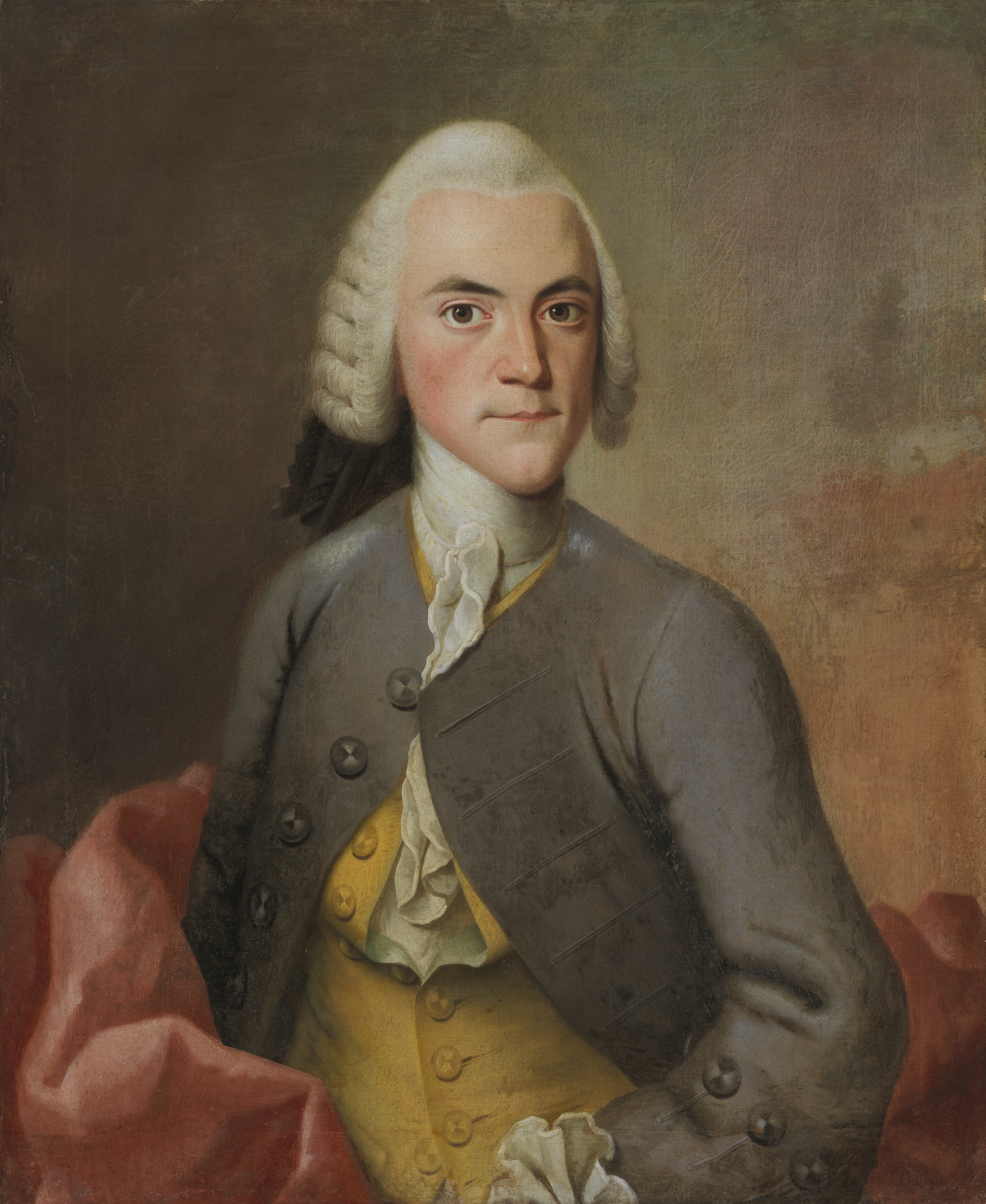
Jørgen Wichfeld.

- 5 April – Georg Mathias Fuchs, painter (born 1719)
- 28 May – Marie Cathrine Preisler, stage actress (born 1761)
- 20 June – Henrik Fisker, naval officer (born 1720)
- 21 June – Andreas Peter Bernstorff, politician (born 1735)
- 15 July – Johan Cornelius Krieger, naval officer (born 1725)
- 29 August – Mariane Bournonville, ballet dancer (born 1768)
- 5 December – Steen Andersen Bille, naval officer (died 1883)
- 19 December – Jørgen Wichfeld, landowner (born 1729)
