= 1794 in Denmark =

- Decades: 1770s; 1780s; 1790s; 1800s; 1810s
- See also: Other events of 1794; List of years in Denmark

Events from the year 1794 in Denmark.

== Incumbents ==
- Monarch – Christian VII
- Prime minister – Andreas Peter Bernstorff

== Events ==
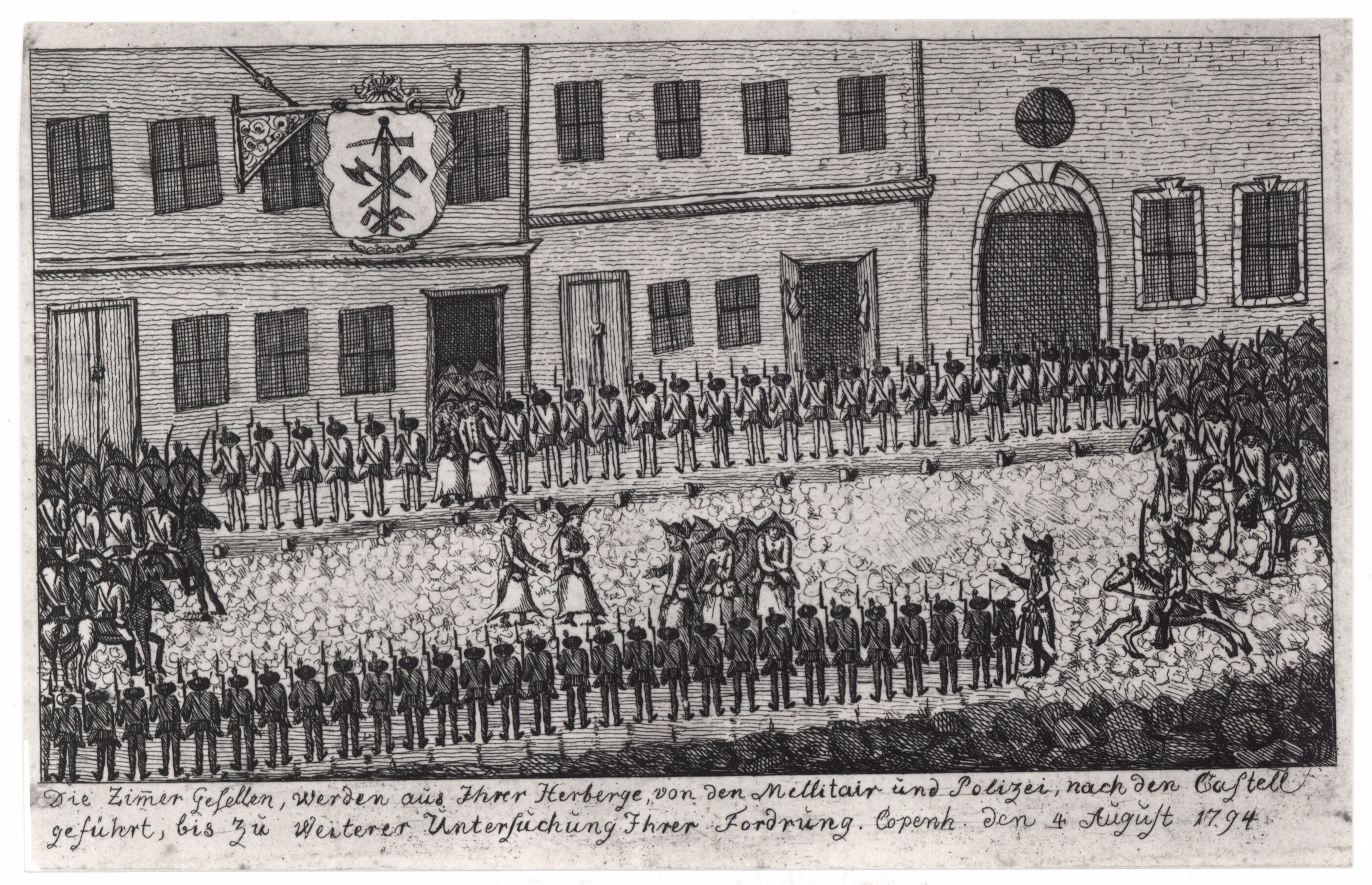
July: The Carpenters' Strike in Copenhagen.

January

- 3 January – Aarhus Stiftstidende, a local newspaper based in Aarhus, is published for the first time.

February

- 26 February – The first Christiansborg Palace is destroyed in a fire.

March

- 27 March – Denmark-Norway and Sweden form a neutrality compact.

June

- 11 June – Friderich Christian Hager receives a commission as governor of the Danish Gold Coast.

July

- July–August – A large strike among carpenters and later some 2,000 other craftsmen hits Copenhagen, resulting in the arrest of more than 200 carpenters. It is met with a general strike involving more than 2,000 craftsmen.

== Births ==
- 4 March – Olaf Nikolas Olsen, cartographer (died 1848)
- 21 March – Poul Martin Møller, academic, writer, and poet (died 1838)
- 14 June – Anna Christiane Ludvigsen, poet (died 1884)
- 26 July – Johan Georg Forchhammer, mineralogist and geologist (died 1865)
- 14 December – Christian Frederik Zeuthen, landowner (died 1850)
- 27 December – Christian Albrecht Bluhme, politician, prime minister of Denmark (died 1866)

== Deaths ==
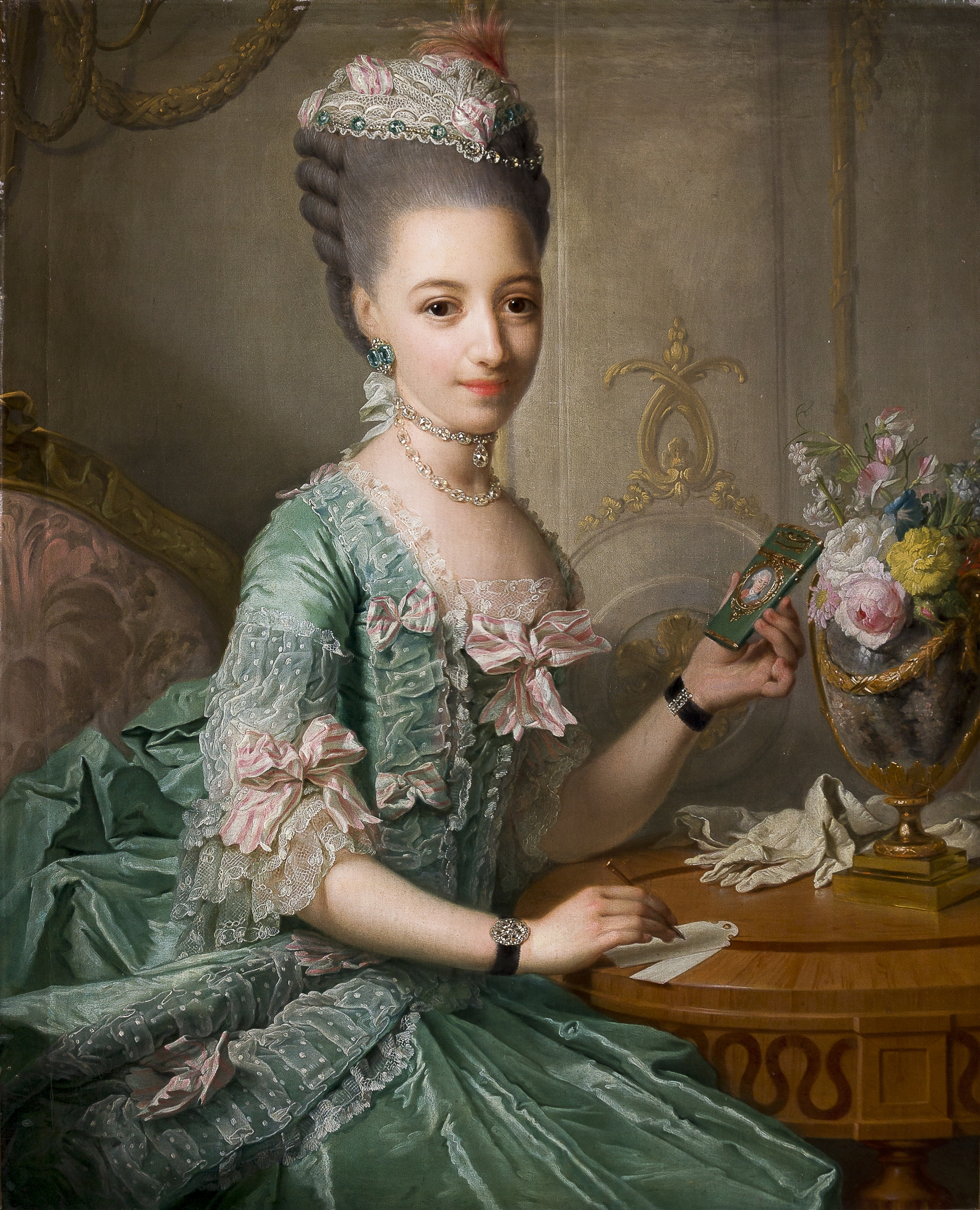
Princess Sophia Frederica.

- 7 January – Frederik Barfred, wine merchant (born 1711)
- 22 March – Laurids Smith, clergyman, philosopher and early animal rights writer (born 1754)
- 22 April – Georg Hjersing Høst, government official and writer (born 1734)
- 26 April – Johan Foltmar, composer (born 1714)
- 8 August – Andreas Bodenhoff, businessman (born 1723)
- 11 August – Christian Ulrik Foltmarm painter (born 1716)
- 29 September – Edvard Stormm educator and writer (born 1749)
- 13 November – Frederick Christian I, Duke of Schleswig-Holstein-Sonderburg-Augustenburg (born 1721)
- 29 November – Princess Sophia Frederica, princess of Denmark (born 1758)
- 29 December – Hermann Abbestée, governor of Danish India (born 1728)
