= 1801 in Denmark =

- Decades: 1780s; 1790s; 1800s; 1810s; 1820s
- See also: Other events of 1801; List of years in Denmark

Events from the year 1801 in Denmark.

== Incumbents ==
- Monarch – Christian VII
- Prime minister – Christian Günther von Bernstorff

== Events ==
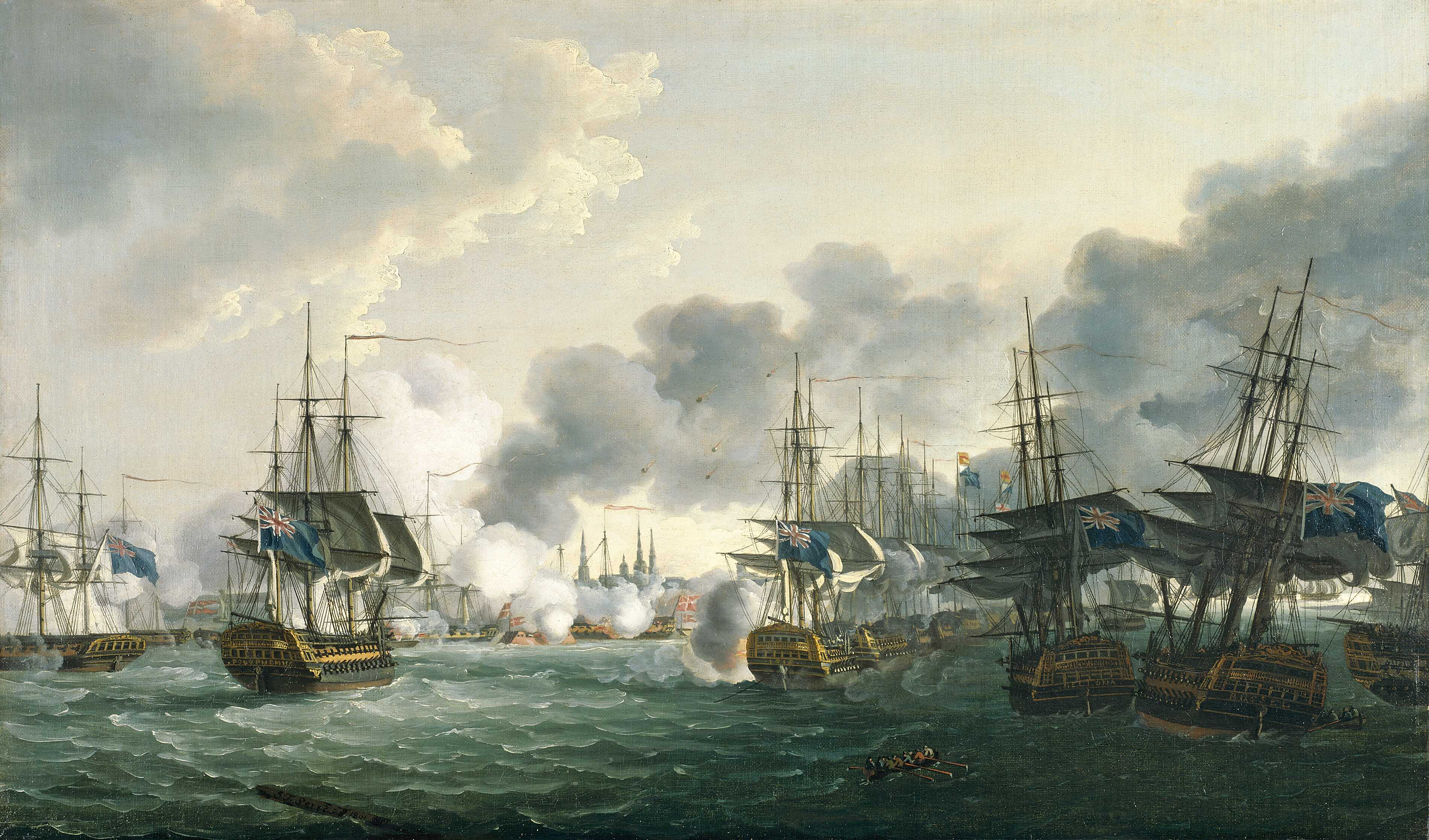
The Battle of Copenhagen, painting by John Thomas Serres.

- Denmark joins the Second League of Armed Neutrality.
- 3 March – Battle of West Kay: the Danish brig HDMS Lougen is attacked by two British vessels at West Kay in the Danish West Indies.
- 2 April – The Battle of Copenhagen takes place.
- 9 April – A meeting between Crown Prince Frederik and Vice Admiral Lord Nelson at Amalienborg Palace results in a ceasefire. Denmark-Norway has to leave the neutrality pact.
- 8 May – Capture of Serampore)
- 12 May – Capture of Tranquebar
- 6 July – The first vaccination against smallpox in Denmark is made, using the method invented by Edward Jenner.

=== Undated ===
- Exercise is for the first time introduced in the curriculum of a state school in Denmark.

== Births ==
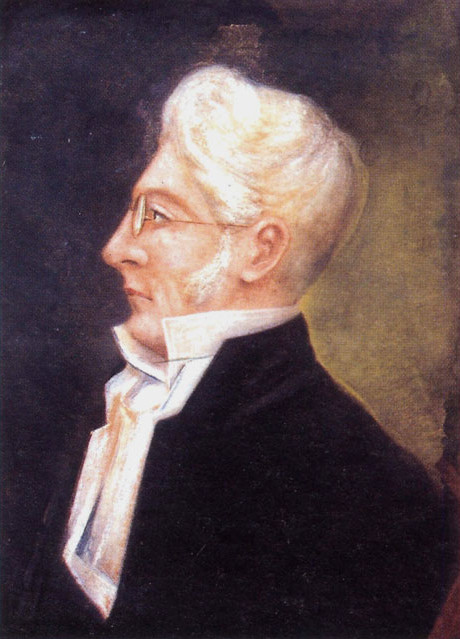
Peter Wilhelm Lund.

=== January–March ===
- 16 January – Thomas Clausen, mathematician (died 1885 in Russia)
- 17 March – Carl Wilhelm Thalbitzer, landowner and politician (died 1867)

=== April–June ===
- 4 April – Frederik Oxholm, colonial administrator (died 1871)
- 14 June – Peter Wilhelm Lund, natural scientist (died 1880 in Brazil)
- 24 June – Jørgen Valentin Sonne, painter (died 1890)

=== July–September ===
- 28 August – Adolph Stramboe, ballet dancer (died 1850)

=== October–December ===
- 13 October – Søren Hjorth, railway pioneer and inventor (died 1870)

== Deaths ==
- 20 January – Alexander Kølpin (born 1731)
- 21 January – Peter Christian Abildgaard, scientist (born 1740)
- 15 February – Vilhelm Bornemann, Hudge Advocate General, chief of police and Supreme Court justice (born 1731 in Norway)

=== Fill date missing ===
- Elisabeth Christine Berling, businessperson (born 1744)
