= 1793 in Denmark =

- Decades: 1770s; 1780s; 1790s; 1800s; 1810s
- See also: Other events of 1793; List of years in Denmark

Events from the year 1793 in Denmark.

== Incumbents ==
- Monarch – Christian VII
- Prime minister – Andreas Peter Bernstorff

== Events ==
- 4 September – A royal decree reduces the number of counties (Danish: amt, pl. amter) to 20.

== Births ==
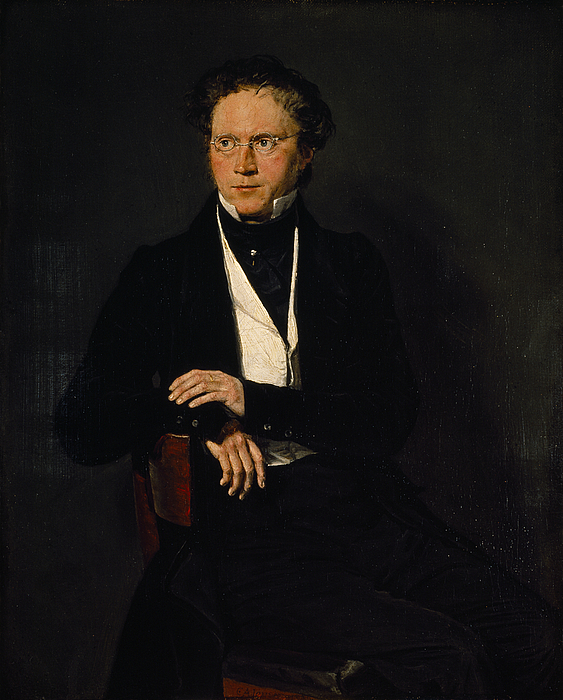
Ludvig Bødtcher.

- 22 April
  - Ludvig Bødtcher, lyric poet (died 1874)
  - Henrik Nicolai Clausen, theologian (died 1877)
- 28 October – Princess Caroline of Denmark (died 1881)

== Deaths ==
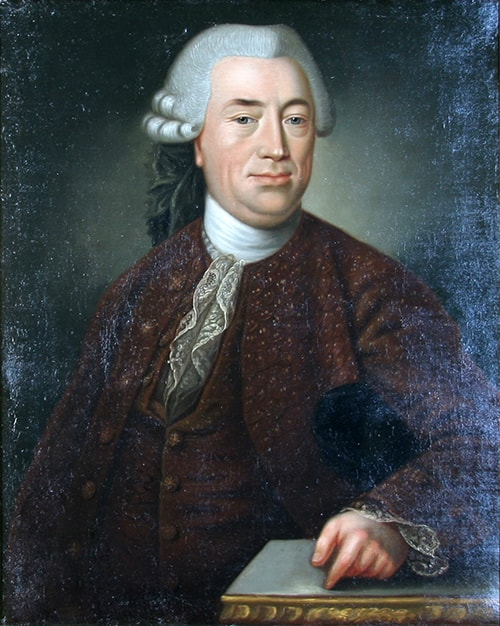
Christian Fædder.

- 7 April – Christian Fædder, chief of police (born 1712)
- 8 August – Henrik Kyhlm clockmaker (died 1866)
- 15 September – Johan Theodor Holmskjold, botanist, civil servant (born 1731)
- 21 October – Johann Hartmann, violinist and composer (born 1726)
- 23 October – Christopher Georg Wallmoden, landowner and county governor (born 1730 in Germany)
