= 1799 in Denmark =

- Decades: 1770s; 1780s; 1790s; 1800s; 1810s
- See also: Other events of 1799; List of years in Denmark

Events from the year 1799 in Denmark.

== Incumbents ==
- Monarch – Christian VII
- Prime minister – Christian Günther von Bernstorff

== Births ==
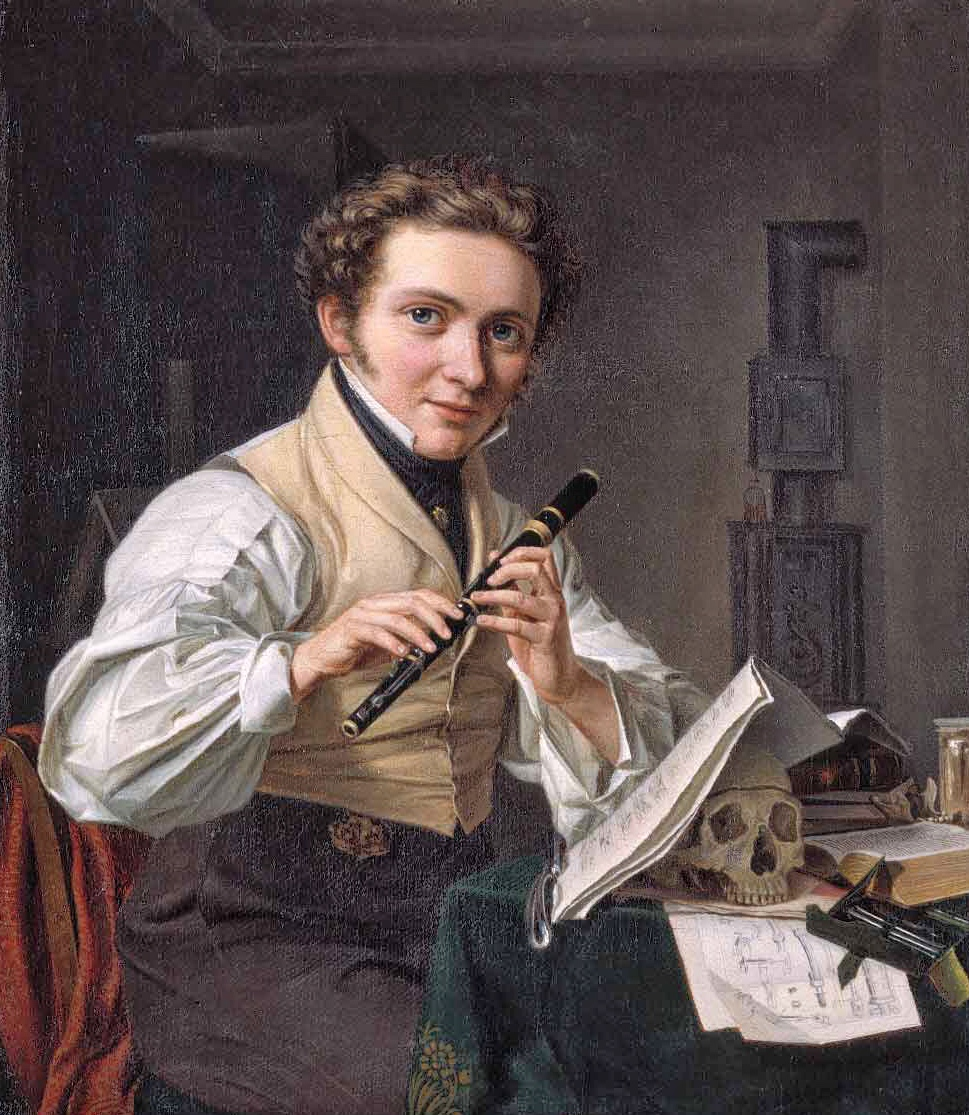
Emil Bærentzen.

- 3 February – John Christmas, naval officer, plantation owner and acting Governor-General of the Danish West Indies (died 1873)
- 22 March – Henrik Nikolai Krøyer, zoologist and zoology teacher and textbook author (died 1870)
- 31 March – Johannes Steenfeldt, scientific illustrator (died 1861)
- 30 October – Emil Bærentzen, painter (died 1868)

== Deaths ==
- 14 April – Louise von Plessen, lady-in-waiting and memoir writer (born 1725)
- 28 December – Pauline Maria Tutein, philanthropist (born 1725 in the Holy Roman Empire)
- 28 December – Pauline Maria Tutein, philanthropist (born 1725)
