= Banknotes of Denmark, 1972 series =

Series of Danish banknotes

The 1972 series of Danish Banknotes are part of the physical form of Denmark's currency, the Danish Krone (kr.), which have been issued solely by Danmarks Nationalbank since 1 August 1818. The series was printed from 1972 until they were replaced by the 1997 series. As of 2025, they are no longer legal tender.

The theme of the notes is paintings by Jens Juel (1745–1802) of various more or less famous people on the front sides and common animals in Denmark on the back sides.

== 10-kroner note ==
10 kroner bill

The 10 kroner note was issued on 8 April 1975 and went out of print on 11 March 1980 when it was replaced by a coin. It features Cathrine Sophie Kirchhoff, née Christensen, who was married to Councillor of State J. H. Kirchhoff and a female common eider painted by Johannes Larsen.

== 20-kroner note ==
20 kroner bill

The 20 kroner note was issued on 11 March 1980 and went out of print on 10 April 1990 when it was replaced by a coin. It features Pauline Maria Tutein, née Tath, and two house sparrows drawn by Gunnar Larsen (1919–1981).

It was part of an April Fools' Day hoax in Denmark in which all notes on which the two sparrows only showed 3 legs were said to be counterfeited. On all notes the sparrows only show 3 legs.

== 50-kroner note ==
50 kroner note

The 50 kroner note was issued on 21 January 1975 and went out of print on 7 May 1999. It features Engelke Charlotte Ryberg, née Falbe, and a Crucian carp drawn by Ib Andersen (1907–1969).

== 100-kroner note ==
100 kroner note

The 100 kroner note was issued on 22 October 1974. A new version of the note began production in 1995 which had additional security features. The note went out of print on 22 November 1999. It features a self-portrait by Jens Juel and a red underwing drawn by Ib Andersen.

== 500-kroner note ==
500 kroner note

The 500 kroner note was issued on 18 April 1972 it went out of print on 12 September 1997. It features Franziska Genoveva von Qualen, née d'Abbestée, and a sand lizard drawn by Ib Andersen.

== 1000-kroner note ==
1000 kroner note

The 1000 kroner note was issued on 11 March 1975 and went out of print on 18 September 1998. It features Thomasine Heiberg, née Buntzen and a red squirrel drawn by Ib Andersen. Heiberg was the mother-in-law of Johanne Luise Heiberg who would later feature on the on the 200 kroner note in the 1997 series.
