= 1796 in Denmark =

- Decades: 1770s; 1780s; 1790s; 1800s; 1810s
- See also: Other events of 1796; List of years in Denmark

Events from the year 1796 in Denmark.

== Incumbents ==
- Monarch – Christian VII
- Prime minister – Andreas Peter Bernstorff

== Events ==
- 13 October – Hansen's Konditori

== Births ==
- 5 January – Laurentius Johannes Cramer, businessman (bprn 1748)
- 14 February – Poul Pagh, merchant and shipowner (died 1870)
- 8 April – Frederik von Scholten, naval officer and painter (died 1853)
- 28 June – Caroline Amalie of Augustenburg, Queen of Denmark (died 1881)
- 29 July – Christian Winther, lyric poet (died 1876)
- 3 August – Johan Ferdinand de Neergaard, county govvernor and landowner (died 1849)
- 7 August – Barthold Georg Niebuhr, statesman, banker and historian (died 183 1in Prussia)

== Deaths ==
- 12 April – William Halling, landowner (born 1744)
- 10 October – Queen Juliana Maria, Queen of Denmark (born 1729)
- 25 October – Frederik Michael Krabbe, naval officer and master shipbuilder (born 1725)
