= 1800 in Denmark =

- Decades: 1780s; 1790s; 1800s; 1810s; 1820s
- See also: Other events of 1800; List of years in Denmark

Events from the year 1800 in Denmark.

== Incumbents ==
- Monarch – Christian VII
- Prime minister – Christian Günther von Bernstorff

== Events ==
- 4 July – St. Nicolas Church, one of the four Medieval churches in Copenhagen, is closed.
- 16 December – Denmark enters a pact of neutrality with Sweden and Russia, and on 18 December also with Prussia.

=== Date unknown ===
- A semaphore line, also known as an optical telegraph, is established between Copenhagen and Schleswig, with 23 reply stations across Zealand, Funen and Als.
- Kronprinsessegade is established in Copenhagen.
- Conrad Malte-Brun is sent into exile for his pamphlets which contained outright criticism of the government, something which the new censorship laws forbade.

== Births ==
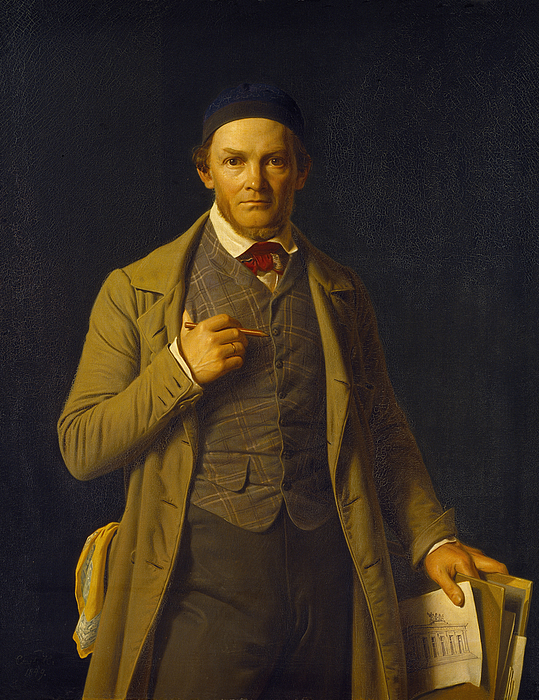
Gottlieb Bindesbøll.

=== January–March ===
- 14 February – Holger Christian Reedtz, government official, diplomat and landowner (died 1857)
- 2 March – Carl Neergaard, landowner and politician (died 1850)

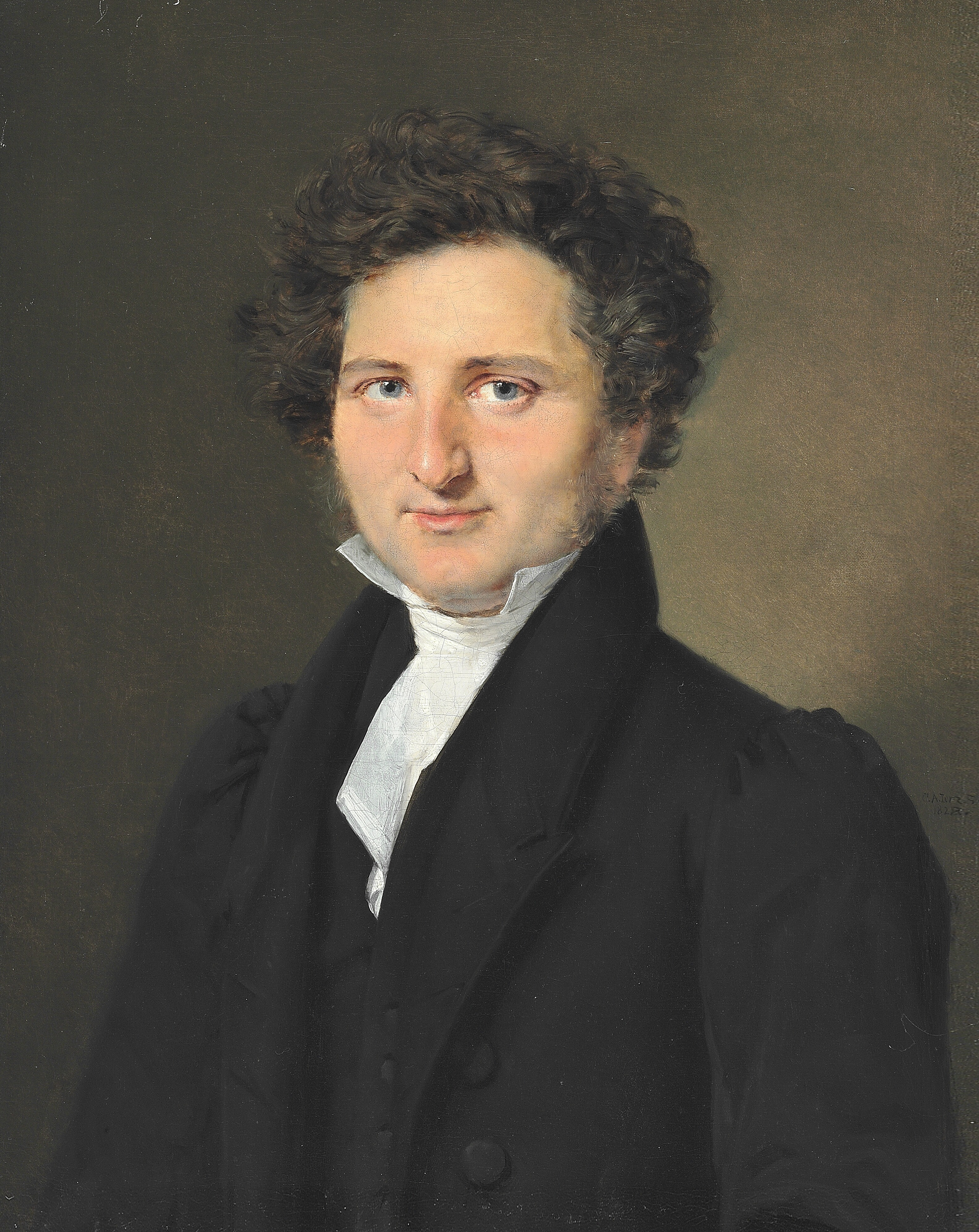
Johan Laurentz Jensen.

- 8 March – Johan Laurentz Jensen, painter (died 1856)

=== April–June ===
- 2 April – Johannes Dam Hage, editor (died 1857)
- 31 May – Frederik Sødring, painter (died 1862)

=== July–September ===
- 2 August – Caspar Peder Rothe Ingerslev, politician 1864)
- 5 September – Gottlieb Bindesbøll, architect (died 1856)

=== October–December ===
- 31 October – Peter Lassen, rancher in the United States, namesake of Lassen County, California (died 1859)
- 3 November – Rasmus Carl Stæger, judge, financial advisor to the government, entomologist (died 1875)
- 11 November – Jørgen Balthasar Dalhoff, goldsmith and industrialist (died 1890)
- 4 December – Emil Aarestrup, poet (died 1856)
- 1 December – Charles Ferdinand Léonard Mourier, Supreme Court justice (died 1880)
- 31 December – Carl Heinrich Delcomyn, gunsmith (died 1864)

== Deaths ==
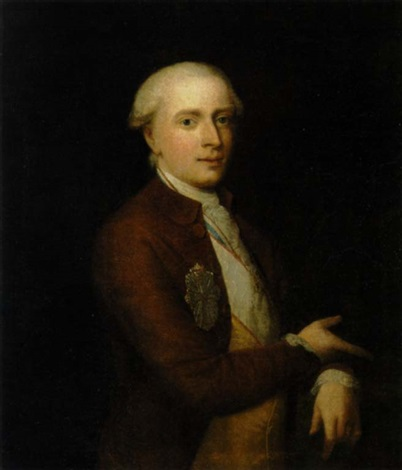
Conrad Golck.

=== January–March ===
- 7 January – Stephan Hofgaard Cordsen, Supreme Court justice (born 1727)

=== April–June ===
- 27 April – Christian Jensen Mørup, architect (born 1732)

=== October–December ===
- 7 December – Conrad Holck, courtier and politician (born 1745)

=== Full date missing ===
- Anna Klemens, witch trial victim (born 1718)
