= 1792 in Denmark =

- Decades: 1770s; 1780s; 1790s; 1800s; 1810s
- See also: Other events of 1792; List of years in Denmark

Events from the year 1792 in Denmark.

== Incumbents ==
- Monarch – Christian VII
- Prime minister – Andreas Peter Bernstorff

== Events ==
May

- 16 May
  - Denmark declares transatlantic slave trade illegal after 1803 (though slavery continues until 1848)
  - The Medal of Merit is established.

December

- 1 December – HDMS Nidelven is launched at Nyholm in Copenhagen.
- 7 December – HDMS Skjold is launched in Copenhagen.

=== Date unknown ===
- N. Schiøtt & Hochbrandt is founded.

== Births ==
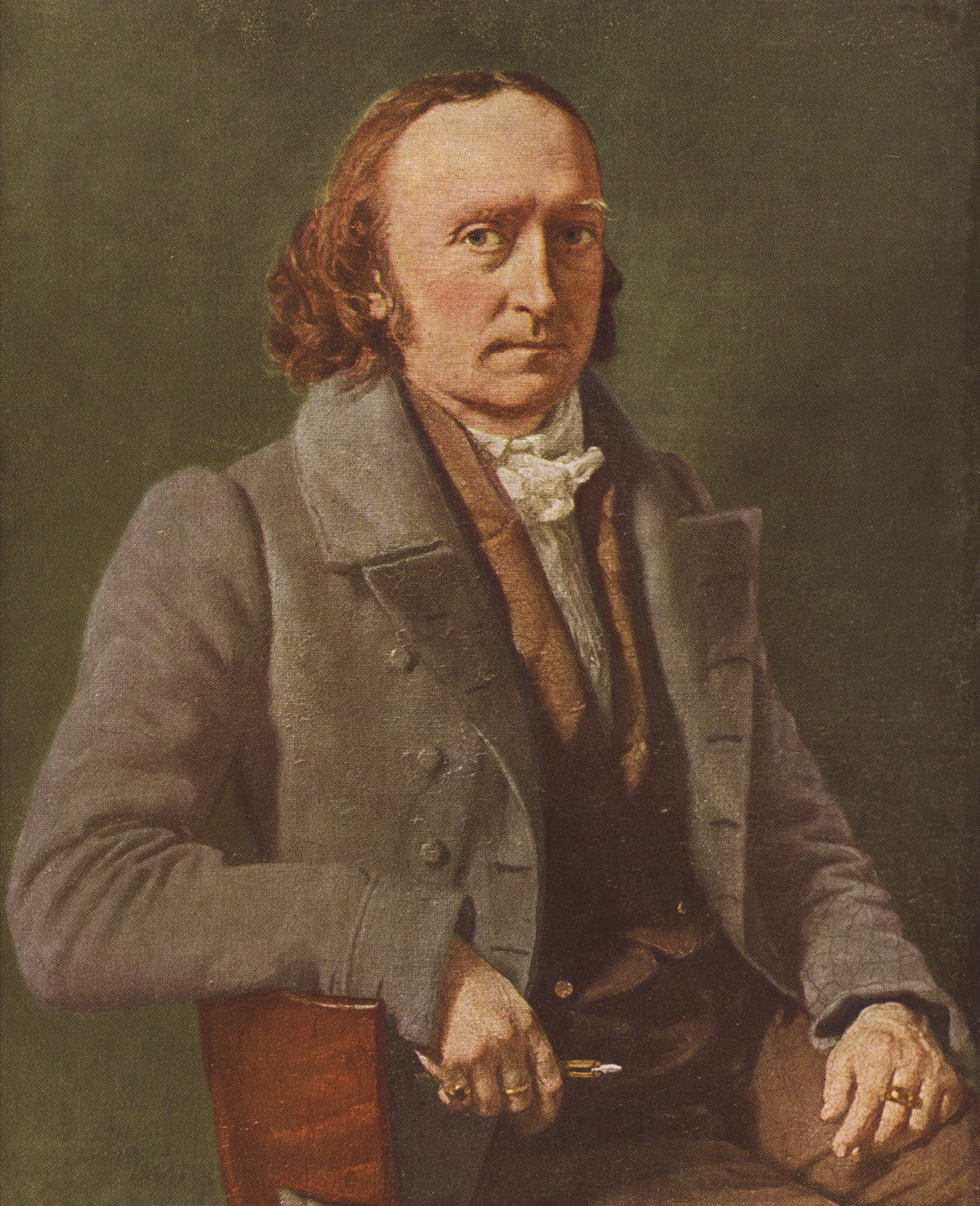
Christian Albrecht Jensen.

- 14 January – Christian de Meza, Commander (died 1865)
- 19 February – Lucie Ingemannm painter (died 1868)
- 2 April – Johannes Theodorus Suhr, merchant and industrialist (died 1858)
- 12 June – William Frederik Duntzfelt, businessman (died 1863)
- 26 June – Christian Albrecht Jensen, portrait painter during the Danish Golden Age (died 1870)
- 7 July – Hans Hedemann, military officer /died 1959 in Norway)
- 6 August – Frederikke Dannemand, royal mistress (died 1862)
- 12 August – Hans Harder, painter and drawing master (died 1873)
- 20 September – Ida Brunm socialite (died 1857)
- 29 September – Andreas Gottlob Rudelbach, theologian (died 1862)
- 22 November – Ferdinand, Hereditary Prince of Denmark (died 1863)

== Deaths ==
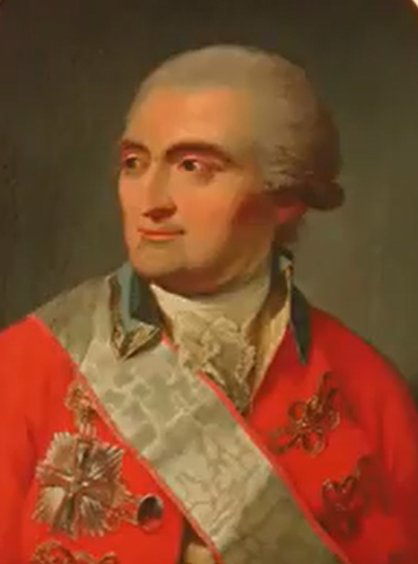
Johan Frederik Classen.

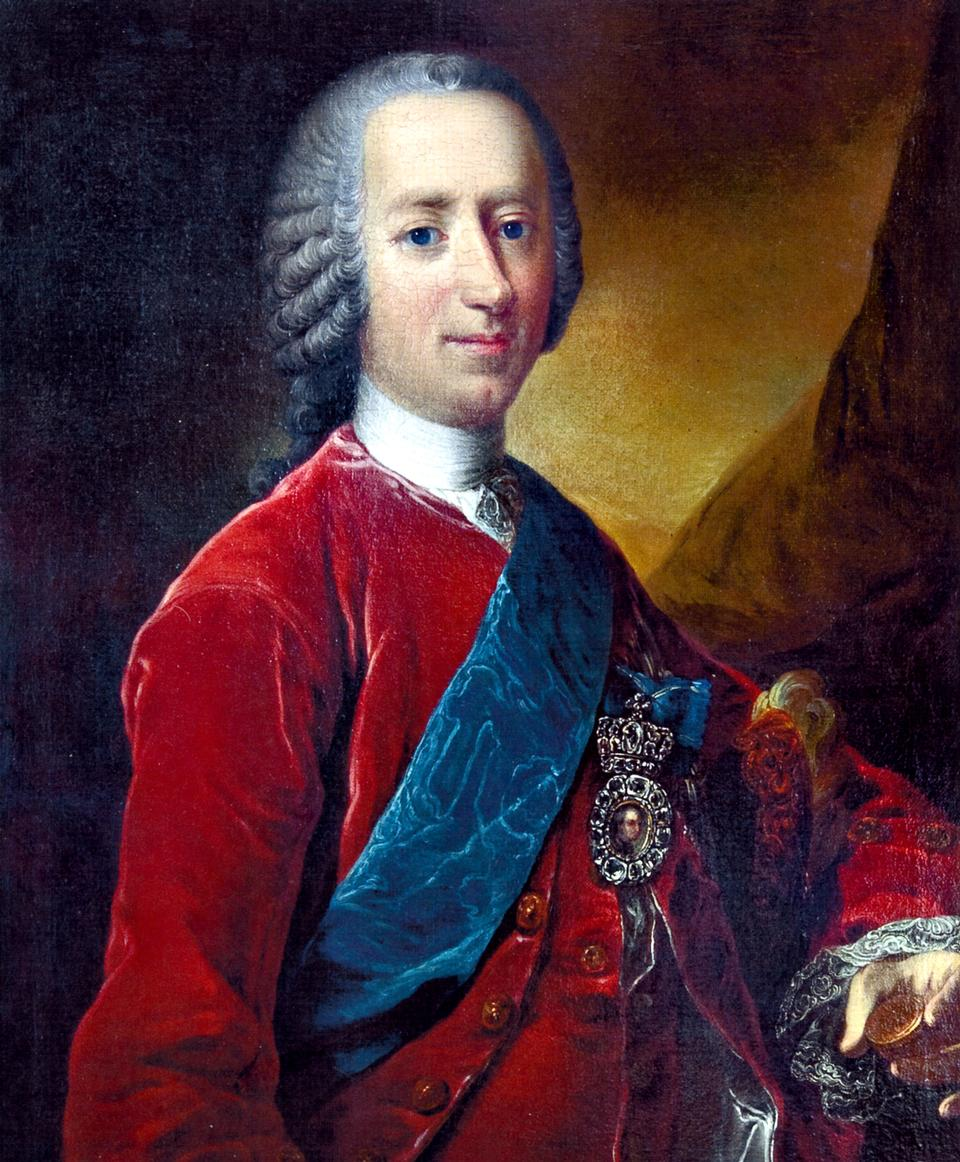
Adam Gottlob Moltke.

- 22 April – Alexander Walker Ross, military officer (born 1710)
- 24 March – Johan Frederik Classen, Danish-Norwegian industrialist and philanthropist (born 1725)
- 18 July – Christine Sophie von Gähler, courtier (born 1745)
- 25 September – Adam Gottlob Moltke, Lord Chamberlain to Frederick V (born 1710)
- 29 October – Cathrine Marie Gielstrup, stage actress (born 1755)

=== Full date missing ===
- Peter Thorstensen, physician and chemist (born 1862)
