= 1798 in Denmark =

- Decades: 1770s; 1780s; 1790s; 1800s; 1810s
- See also: Other events of 1798; List of years in Denmark

Events from the year 1798 in Denmark.

== Incumbents ==
- Monarch – Christian VII
- Prime minister – Christian Günther von Bernstorff

== Events ==
May

- 9 May – The County of Vrahesminde is established by Preben Bille-Brahe from the manors of af Hvedholm, Damsbo, Stensgård and Østrupgård.

June

- 20 June – The abolishment of the Stavnsbånd, a serfdom-like institution originally introduced in 1733. The implementation was gradual.

== Births ==
- 4 June – Niels Laurits Høyen, art historian (Denmark's first) and critic (died 1870)
- 19 July – Christian August, future Duke of Schleswig-Holstein-Sonderburg-Augustenburg (died 1869)
- 11 October – Thomas Overskou, actor, playwright and historian (died 1873)
- 13 October – Herman Wilhelm Bissen, sculptor (died 1868)
- 18 December – Emil Normann, painter (died 1881)

== Deaths ==
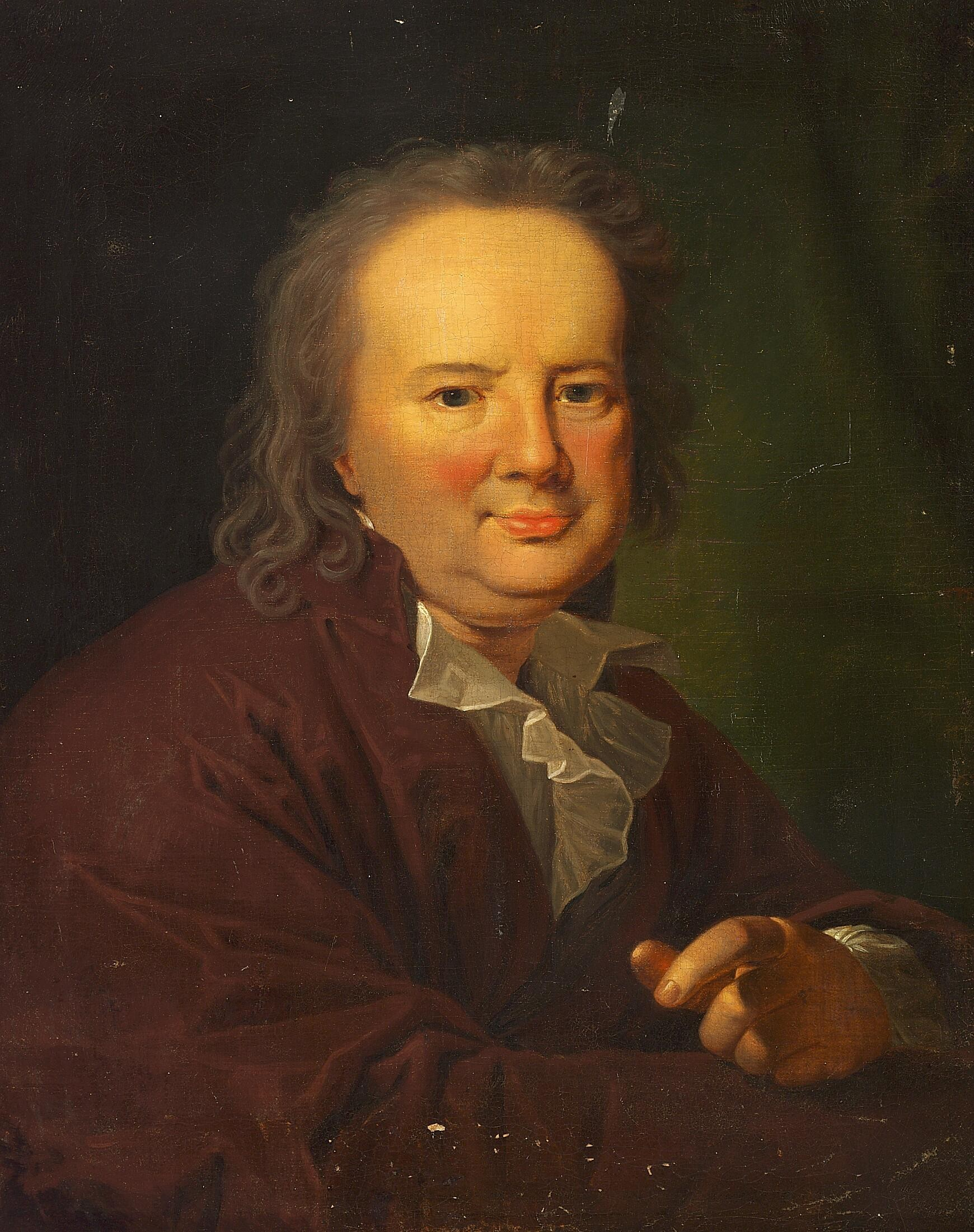
Peter Frederik Suhm.

- 7 September – Peter Frederik Suhm, historian (born 1728)
- 21 October – Thomas de Malleville, colonial administrator (born 1739)
- 1 December – Michael Gottlieb Birckner, priest and philosopher (born 1756)
- 11 November – Peter Uldall, Supreme Court attorney, Public Prosecutor General and burgermaster (born 1743)
- 20 December – Johan Zoëga, entomologist and botanist (born 1742)
