= 1731 in Denmark =

- Decades: 1710s; 1720s; 1730s; 1740s; 1750s
- See also: Other events of 1731; List of years in Denmark

Events from the year 1731 in Denmark.

== Incumbents ==
- Monarch – Christian VI
- Prime Minister – Iver Rosenkrantz

== Events ==
- 26 January – Kjøbenhavns Brandforsikring (Copenhagen Fire Insurance) is founded, speeding up the rebuilding of the city after the Copenhagen Fire of 1728 significantly since lending out money for construction projects becomes less risky.
- 4 March – The Reformed Church in Copenhagen is reinaugurated after its rebuilding.
- 8 April – Maglekilde Watermill is the first of a number of buildings which are destroyed in a series of devastating fires that hits Roskilde in 1731.
- 6 June – The coronation of Christian VI of Denmark.
- 7 October – The rebuilt Trinitatis Church is reinaugurated in Copenhagen.

=== Undated ===
- Nicolaus Zinzendorf visits Copenhagen and the Moravian Church gains considerable popularity
- Denmark-Norway introduces a new Royal Standard flag.

== Births ==
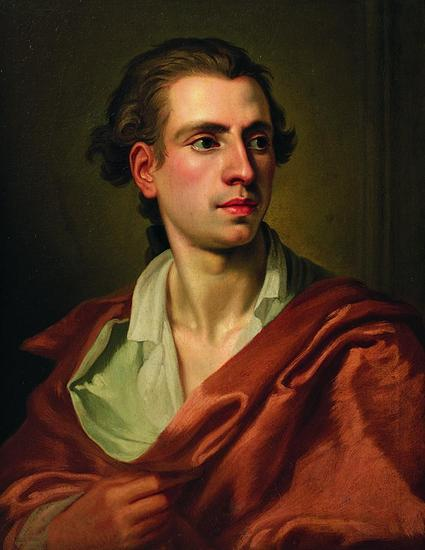
Johannes Wiedewelt.

- 14 January – Hinrich Ladiges, businessman (died 1805)
- 19 March – Niels Brock, merchant (died 1802)
- 2 June – Dorothea Biehl, playwright, translator (died 1788)
- 14 June – Johan Theodor Holmskjold, botanist, civil servant (died 1793)
- 1 July – Johannes Wiedewelt, sculptor (died 1802)
- 1 September – Ove Høegh-Guldberg, statesman, historian, and de facto prime minister of Denmark (died 1808)
- 11 September – Oluf Lundt Bang , lawyer and judge (died 1789)
- 21 October – Jørgen Thomsen Bech, businessman (died 1816)

=== Full date missing ===
- Christian Hee Hwass, malacologist (died 1803)
- Anna Catharina Materna, actress (died 1757)
- Ingrid Maria Wenner, courtier (died 1793)
- Marie Martine Bonfils, brewer (died 1804)
