= 1880 in Brazil =

Events in the year 1880 in Brazil.

== Incumbents ==
- Monarch: Pedro II
- Prime Minister:
  - Viscount of Sinimbu (until 28 March)
  - José Antônio Saraiva (starting March 28)

== Deaths ==
- 25 May – Peter Wilhelm Lund, natural scientist (born 1801 in Denmark)
