= 1728 in Denmark =

- Decades: 1700s; 1710s; 1720s; 1730s; 1740s
- See also: Other events of 1728; List of years in Denmark

Events from the year 1728 in Denmark.

== Incumbents ==
- Monarch – Frederick IV
- Grand Chancellor – Ulrik Adolf Holstein

== Events ==
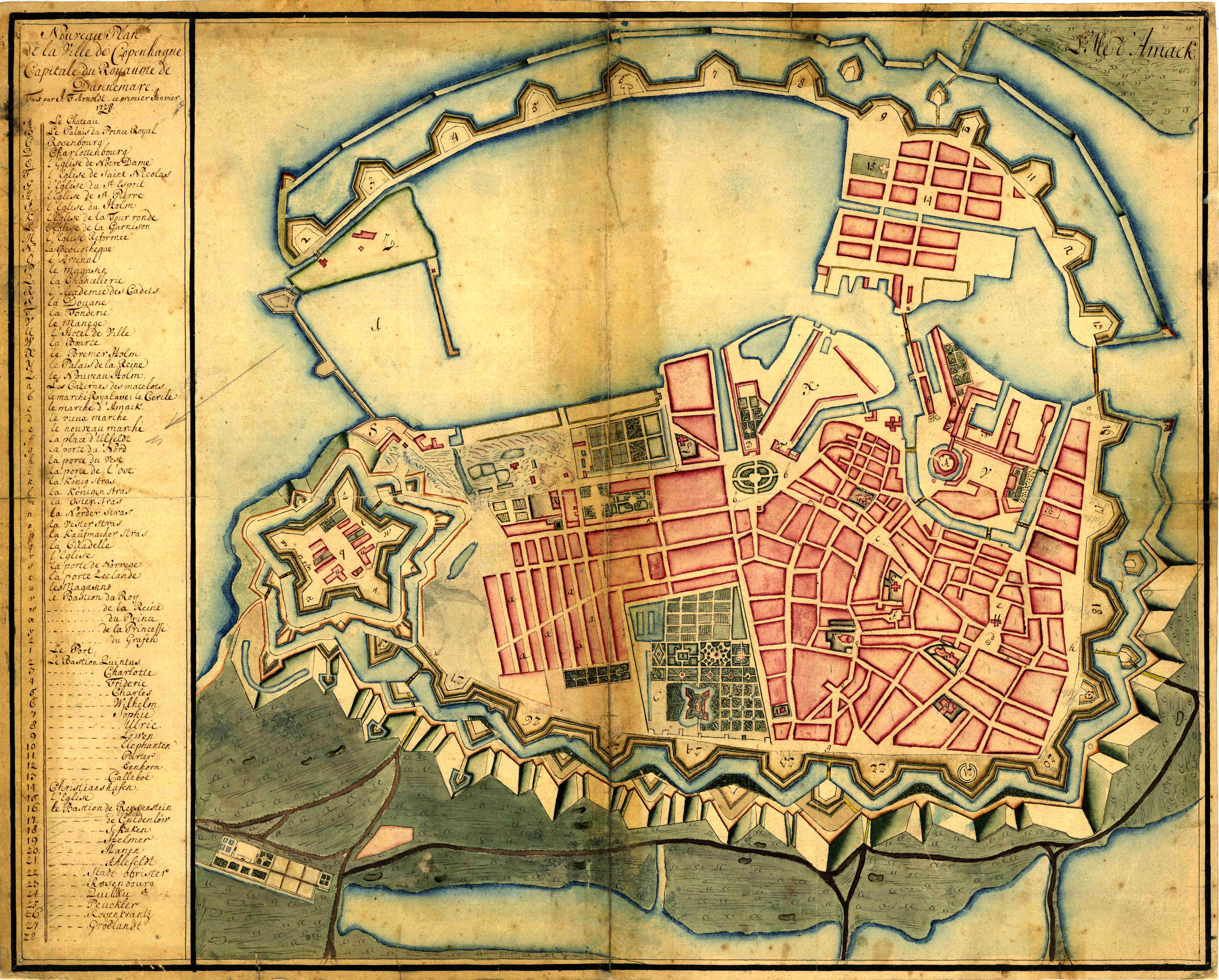
A 1728 map of Copenhagen showing the city as it appeared immediately before the Great Fire of 1728

- 14 July – Vitus Bering begins his first exploration aboard the ship Gabriel and sailed northward from the Kamchatka Peninsula and through the strait that now bears his name.
- 20 October – The Copenhagen Fire of 1728 breaks out.
- 23 October – The fire in Copenhagen finally dies out after destroying approximately 28% of the city and leaving 20% of its population homeless.

=== Undated ===
- The Lille Grønnegade Theatre in Copenhagen, the first public theater in Denmark, is closed.
- A new town hall is built in Viborg next to Viborg Cathedral. The building now houses the Skovgaard Museum

== Births ==
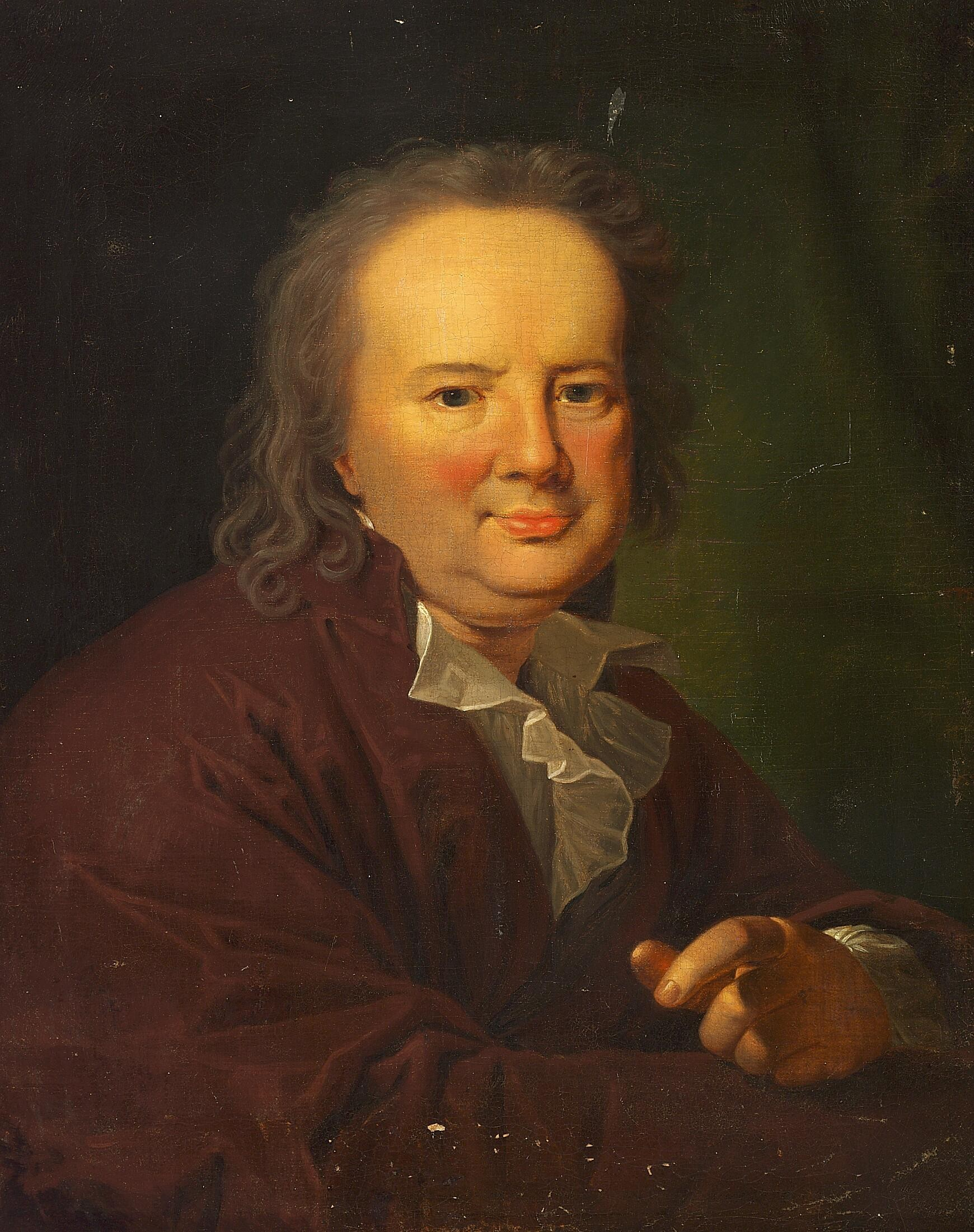
Peter Frederik Suhm.

- 26 June – Frederik Christian von Haven, philologist, theologian and patron of the arts (died 1763)
- 21 June – Mathias Lunding, mayor of Copenhagen and director of the Danish Asiatic Company (died 1788)
- 29 July – Hermann Abbestée, governor of Danish India (died 1794)
- 18 October – Peter Frederik Suhm, historian (died 1798)
- 7 November – Christian Hansen, bisonessman (died 1810)

== Deaths ==
- 3 February – Laurence de Boysset, military officer and landowner (born c. 1733 in France)
- 24 September – Frederik Krag, noble, civil servant (born 1655)
