= Poul Sporon =

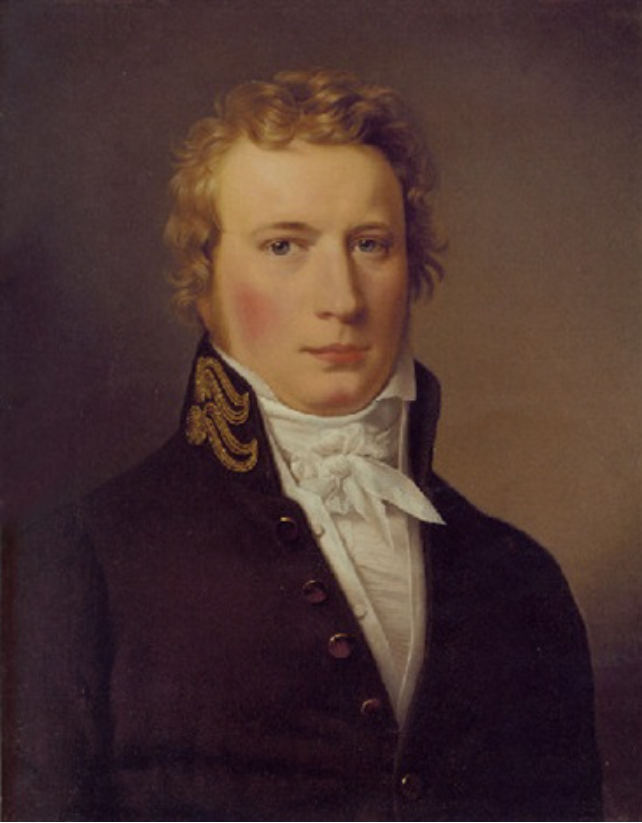
Poul Sporon painted by C. W. Rxkersberg, 1820.

Poul Egede Sporon (30 August 1795 – 29 November 1854) was a Danish Supreme Court attorney.

== Early life and education ==
Sporon was born on 30 August 1795 in Virum, the son of Supreme Court justice Frederik (Friderich) Gottlieb Sporon (1749–1811) and Karen Egede (1754–1799). After graduating from the Schouboe Institute in 1811, he studied at the University of Copenhagen, from which he earned a law degree in 1815.

== Career ==
In 1819, Sporon was licensed as a Supreme Court attorney. He served as an attorney at the Maritime Court and was a member of the Bank of Denmark's board of representatives, becoming its chairman in 1937. In 1838, he was appointed Kammeradvokat. One of his most high-profile cases was the defence of Fædrelandet editor Christian Georg Nathan David. Sporon was awarded the title of justitsråd in 1828, etatsråd in 1836 and konferensråd in 1853. In 1840, he was created a Knight of the Order of the Dannebrog. In 1846, he was awarded the Order of the Dannebrog's Cross of Honour.

== Personal life and death ==
On 19 June 1819 in Holmen Church, Sporon married Søster Ane Kristiane Brorson (1798–1845). He died on 29 November 1854 in Copenhagen.
