= Pauline Maria Tutein =

Danish philanthropist (1725–1799)

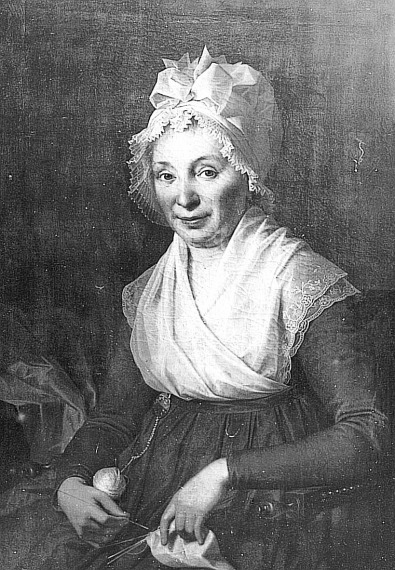
- Portrait of Pauline Maria Tutein painted by Jens Juel
- Born: Pauline Maria Rath; December 24, 1725; Stolzenau, Electorate of Hanover, Holy Roman Empire
- Died: December 28, 1799 (aged 74); Copenhagen, Denmark
- Burial place: Assistens Cemetery (Copenhagen)
- Spouse(s): Ernst Bruckner; Peter Pierre Tutein

Pauline Maria Tutein (née Rath; 24 December 1725 – 28 December 1799) was a Danish philanthropist of Hanoverian origin. She is best known for her donation to the Sankt Petri Schule, through which a German-language girls' school was established in Copenhagen.

Her portrait was featured on the Danish 20 kroner banknote in the currency's 1972 series. The banknote series was themed after paintings by Jens Juel, who had painted her portrait in 1779.

== Biography ==
Pauline Maria was born in Stolzenau on 24 December 1725. She is presumed to be the daughter of Dorothea Stäckelmann and Bernhardt Rath, a county bailiff. She was married to Ernst Bruckner with whom she moved to Denmark, settling in Copenhagen. Bruckner died in 1755. On 12 May 1756, Pauline Maria married Peter Pierre Tutein, a member of the Grosserer-Societetet, who had also immigrated from present-day Germany.

Despite her husband's lucrative career, the couple lived frugally. In 1796, she made a 4000 Danish rigsdaler donation for the establishment of a girls' school within Sankt Petri Schule in Copenhagen. According to Pauline Maria, she managed to save such a sum by restricting her household spending and rejecting "the expensive glitter that the changeable and fickle whim of fashion otherwise demands for a lady's adornment."

She and Peter Pierre had a daughter, Dorothea (Dorthe) Tutein (1764–1814), who married Hartvig Marcus Frisch. Pauline Maria died in Copenhagen on 28 December 1799. She and her spouse were buried together at Assistens Cemetery.
