= Bernt Wilhelm Westermann =

Danish businessman who collected insects

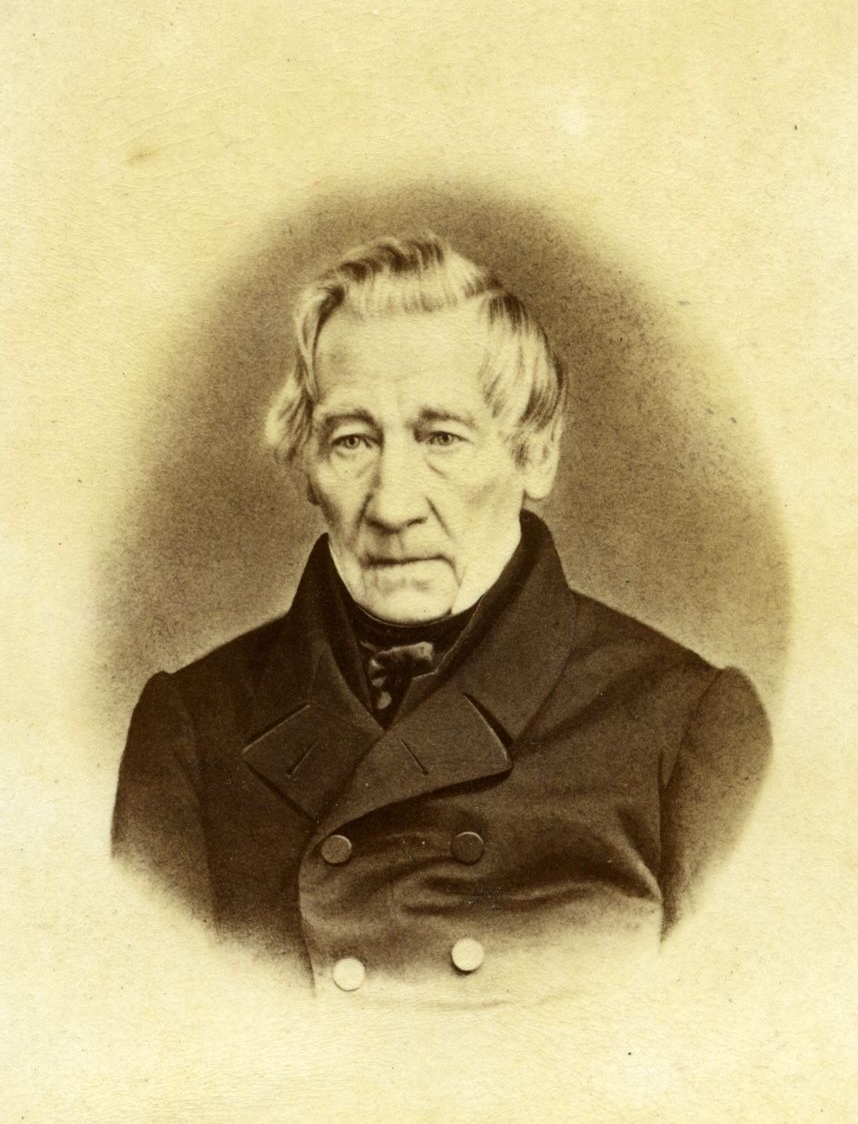
Westermann aged 82

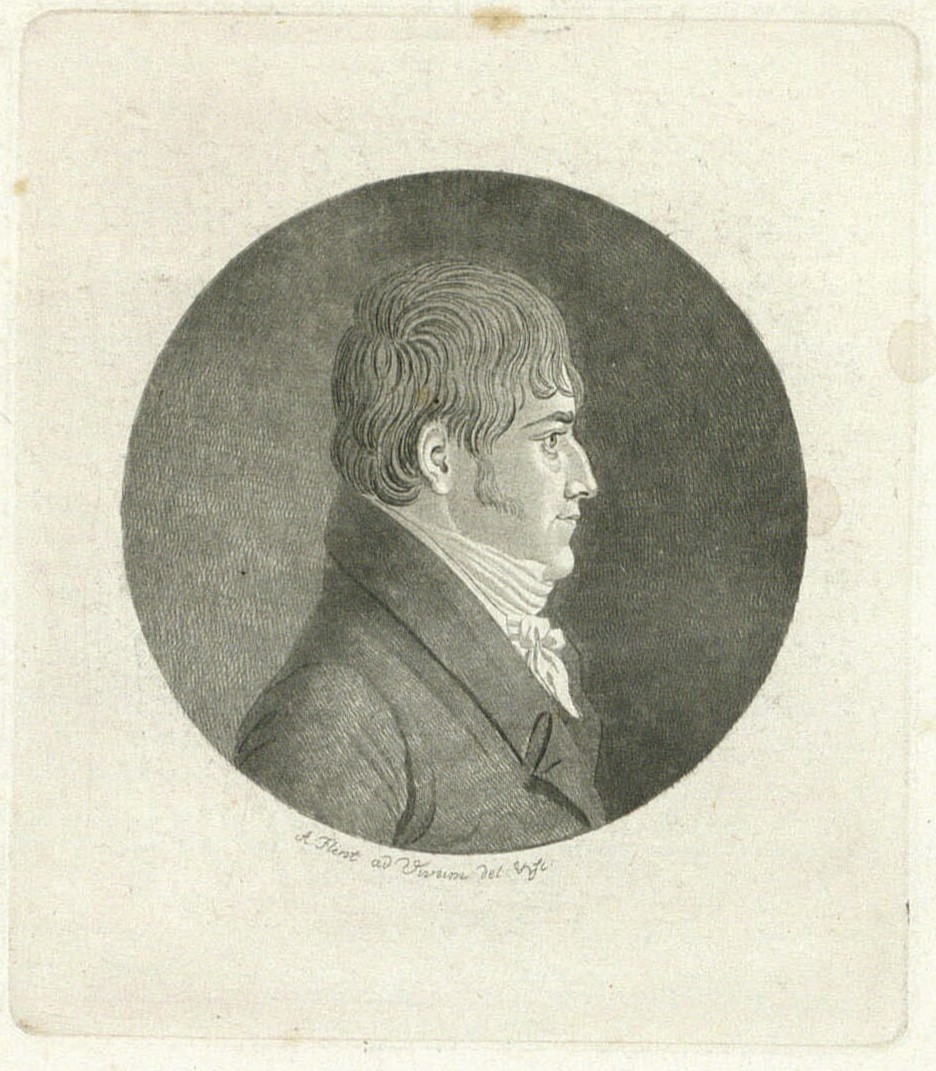
An engraving of Westermann by Andreas Flint

Bernt Wilhelm Westermann (2 October 1781 in Copenhagen – 10 March 1868) was a wealthy Danish businessman who collected insects. He was based in Slotsholmsgade at the 1850 census (Bag Børsen No. 74, first floor).

== Entomology ==
As an amateur insect collector Westermann travelled to Calcutta (India) and later to Jakarta (Indonesia) as an employee of an English business firm.

At the Cape of Good Hope, in Bengal and Java he collected insects for English and Dutch friends, amongst others for Thomas Horsfield. In 1817 he returned to Copenhagen becoming a shipowner and owner of a sugar-refinery at Slotholmsgade in Copenhagen.

Insects from all orders acquired and collected during the rest of his life added to his Cape, Java and Bengal insects to form a notable collection. In all there were 45,000 species in beautiful condition. The collection can be admired today in the Royal Museum Collection in the University of Copenhagen.

== Sources ==
- Entom. Meddel. 15, 1936, p. 161-164, fig. 39-40 portr., p. 197-198.
- Flora Malesiana ser. 1, 5: Cyclopaedia of collectors, Supplement I
- Pont, A. C., 1995 Steenstrupia Copenhagen 21(2): 125 - 154 (Sammlungsverbleib) [11808].
