= Ludvig Bødtcher =

Danish writer

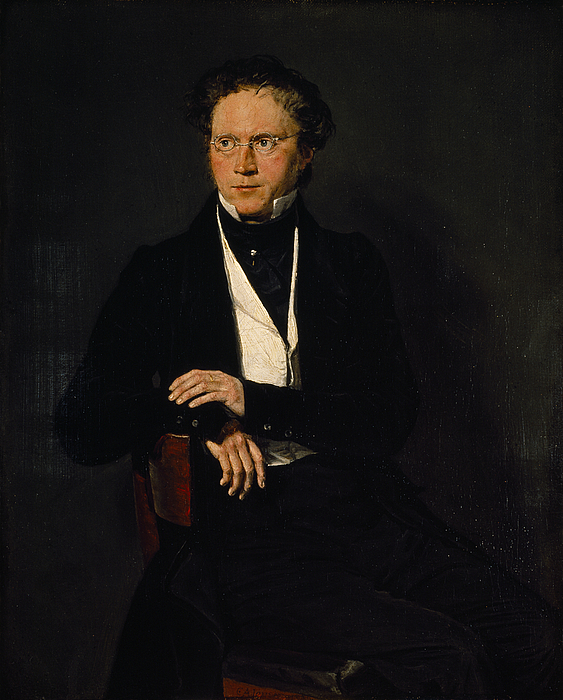
Ludvig Bødtcher, portrait by Christian Albrecht Jensen from 1836. Thorvaldsens Museum

Ludvig Adolph Bødtcher (22 April 1793 – 1 October 1874) was a Danish lyric poet.

He was born and died in Copenhagen. Thanks to an inheritance, he lived in Italy from 1824 for about ten years, where he acted as confidant and guide to the Danish writers Hans Christian Andersen and Henrik Hertz. His most famous poem Mødet med Bacchus, 1846 (”The Meeting with Bacchus”) also deals with Antique mythology. Normally classified an aesthetic like Christian Winther and Emil Aarestrup he is today little known to most Danes.

Some sources give his name in the German form Ludwig Bödtcher.

== Selected works ==
- Digte, ældre og nyere (Poems old and new) (1856). Republished in 1870 with 14 additional poems.
