= HDMS Lindormen =

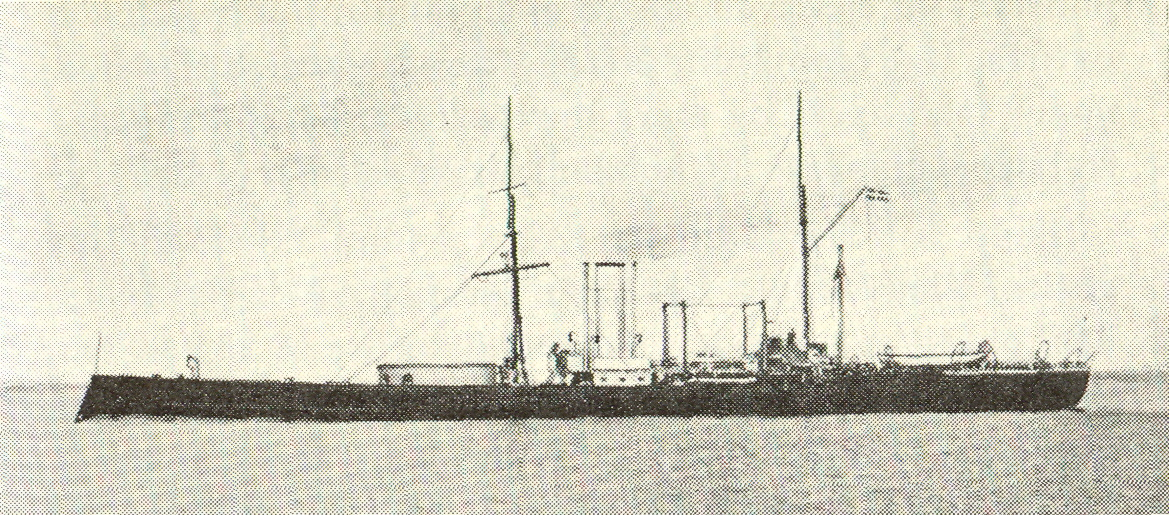
- Lindormen

History

Denmark
- Name: Lindormen
- Builder: Naval Dockyard, Copenhagen
- Laid down: 20 July 1866
- Launched: 8 August 1868
- Commissioned: 15 August 1869
- Decommissioned: 29 June 1907
- Fate: Scrapped, 1907

General characteristics (as completed)
- Type: Monitor
- Displacement: 2,048 metric tons (2,016 long tons)
- Length: 66.42 m (217 ft 11 in) (o/a)
- Beam: 11.99 m (39 ft 4 in)
- Draught: 4.44 m (14 ft 7 in)
- Installed power: 1,500 ihp (1,100 kW)
- Propulsion: 2 shafts, 2 direct-acting steam engines
- Speed: 12.5 knots (23.2 km/h; 14.4 mph)
- Range: 1,400 nmi (2,600 km; 1,600 mi) at 8.5 knots (15.7 km/h; 9.8 mph)
- Complement: 150
- Armament: 2 × Armstrong 9-inch (229 mm) rifled muzzle-loading guns
- Armour: Belt: 127 mm (5 in); Gun turrets: 140 mm (6 in); Conning tower: 127 mm (5.0 in)

The Danish ironclad Lindormen was a monitor built for the Royal Danish Navy in the 1860s. She was scrapped in 1907.

== Description ==
The ship was 66.62 meters (218 ft 7 in) long overall with a beam of 11.99 meters (39 ft 4 in). She had a draft of 4.44 meters (14 ft 7 in) and displaced 2,048 metric tons (2,016 long tons). Her crew consisted of 150 officers and enlisted men.

Lindormen had two horizontal direct-acting steam engines, built by Burmeister & Wain, each driving one propeller shaft. The engines were rated at a total of 1,500 indicated horsepower (1,100 kW) for a designed speed of 12.5 knots (23.2 km/h; 14.4 mph). The ship carried a maximum of 125 metric tons (123 long tons; 138 short tons) of coal that gave her a range of 1,400 nmi (2,600 km; 1,600 mi) at 8.5 knots (15.7 km/h; 9.8 mph).

She was initially armed with two Armstrong 227-millimeter (8.9 in) rifled muzzle-loading (RML) guns mounted in a single turret. In 1876 a pair of 76-millimeter (3.0 in) RML guns were added. Four years later a pair of 87-millimeter (3.4 in) rifled breech-loading guns were also added and the 76-millimeter guns were replaced by another pair of 87-millimeter breech-loading guns in 1885. The 227-millimeter guns were ultimately replaced by a pair of quick-firing 150-millimeter (5.9 in) guns.

The ship had a complete waterline armored belt that was 127 millimeters (5 in) thick. The gun turret was protected by 140-millimeter (5.5 in) armor plates. The conning tower armor was also 127 millimeters thick.

== Construction and career ==
Lindormen, named for a serpent from Norse legend, was laid down by the Naval Dockyard in Copenhagen on 20 July 1866, launched on 8 August 1868 and completed on 15 August 1869. She was stricken from the Navy List on 29 June 1907 and sold for scrap. The ship was broken up in the Netherlands.
