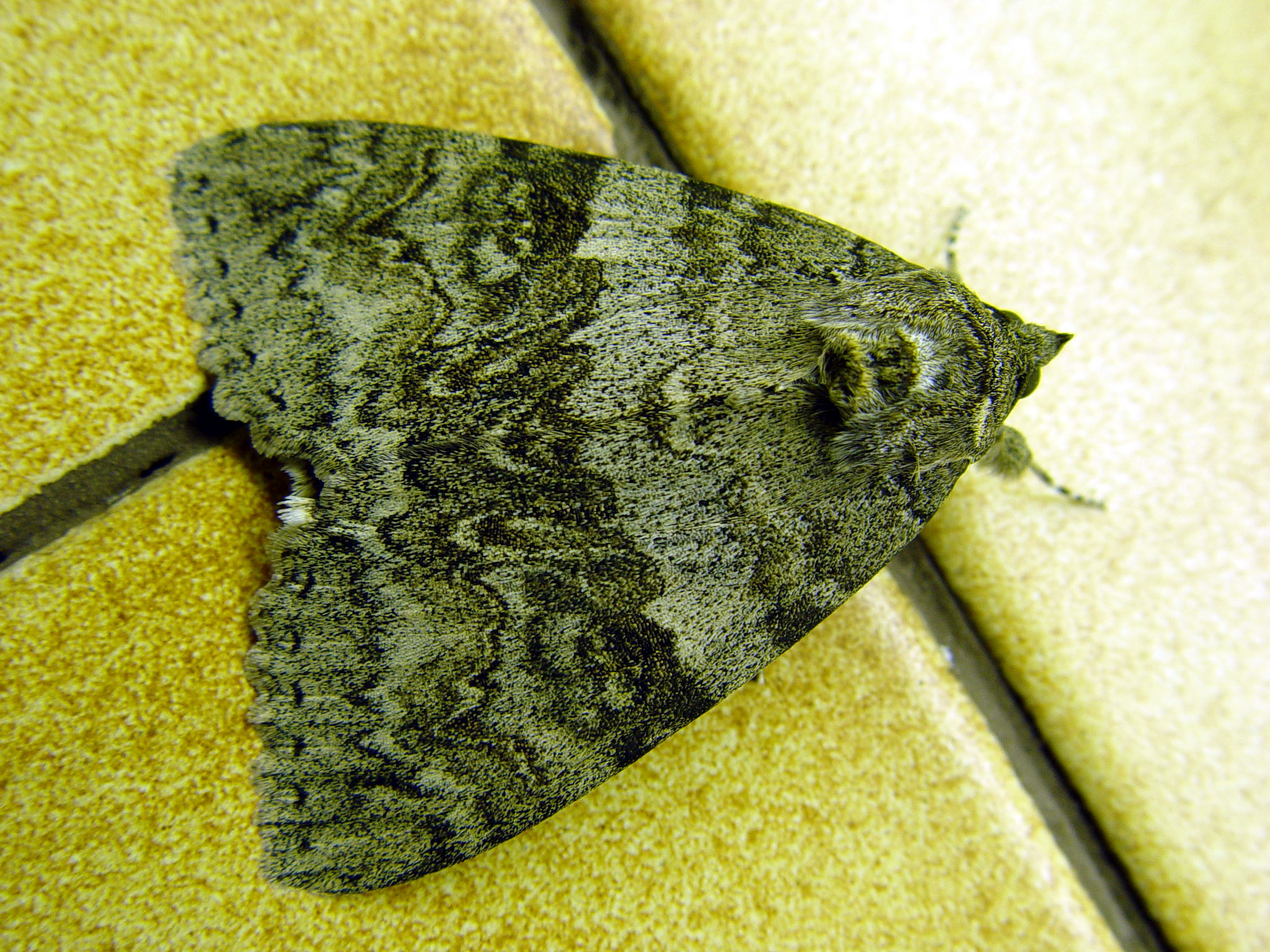

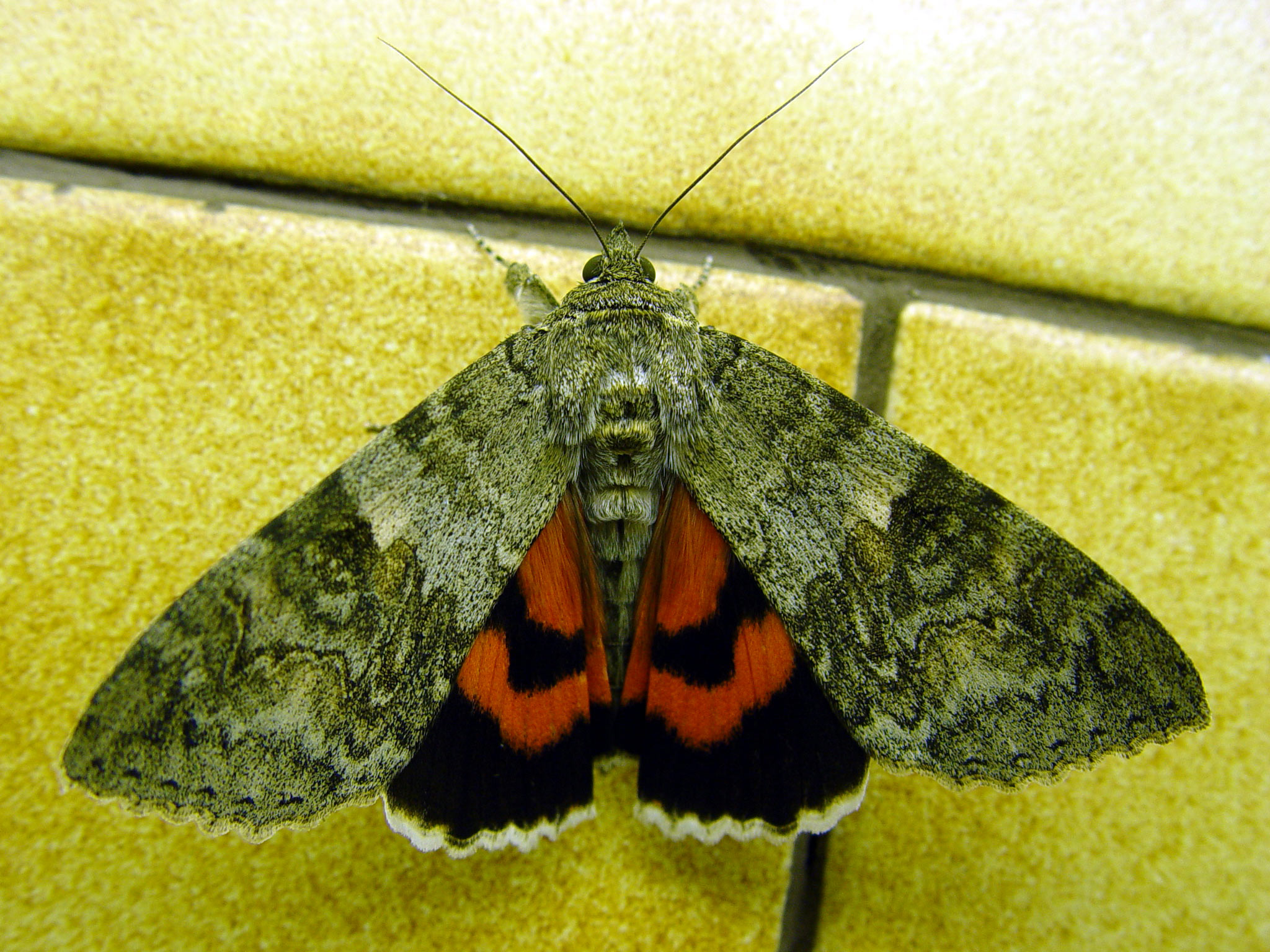

Scientific classification
- Kingdom: Animalia
- Phylum: Arthropoda
- Clade: Pancrustacea
- Class: Insecta
- Order: Lepidoptera
- Superfamily: Noctuoidea
- Family: Erebidae
- Genus: Catocala
- Species: C. nupta

Binomial name
- Catocala nupta (Linnaeus, 1767)

Synonyms
- Phalaena nupta Linnaeus, 1767; Catocala unicuba Walker, [1858]; Catocala concubia Walker, [1858]; Catocala nozawae Matsumura, 1911

= Red underwing =

Species of moth

The red underwing (Catocala nupta) is a moth of the family Erebidae. The species was first described by Carl Linnaeus in his 1767 12th edition of Systema Naturae.

This is a large (80 mm wingspan) nocturnal Palearctic (including Europe) species which, like most noctuids, is above and with the wings closed drably coloured to aid concealment during the day. It flies in August and September, and comes freely to both light and sugar.

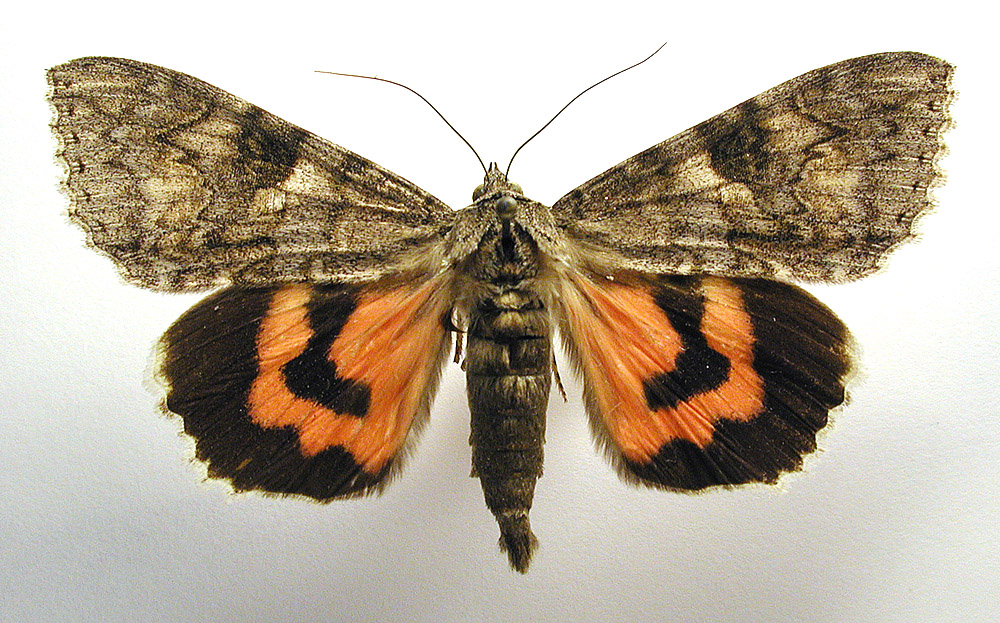
Mounted

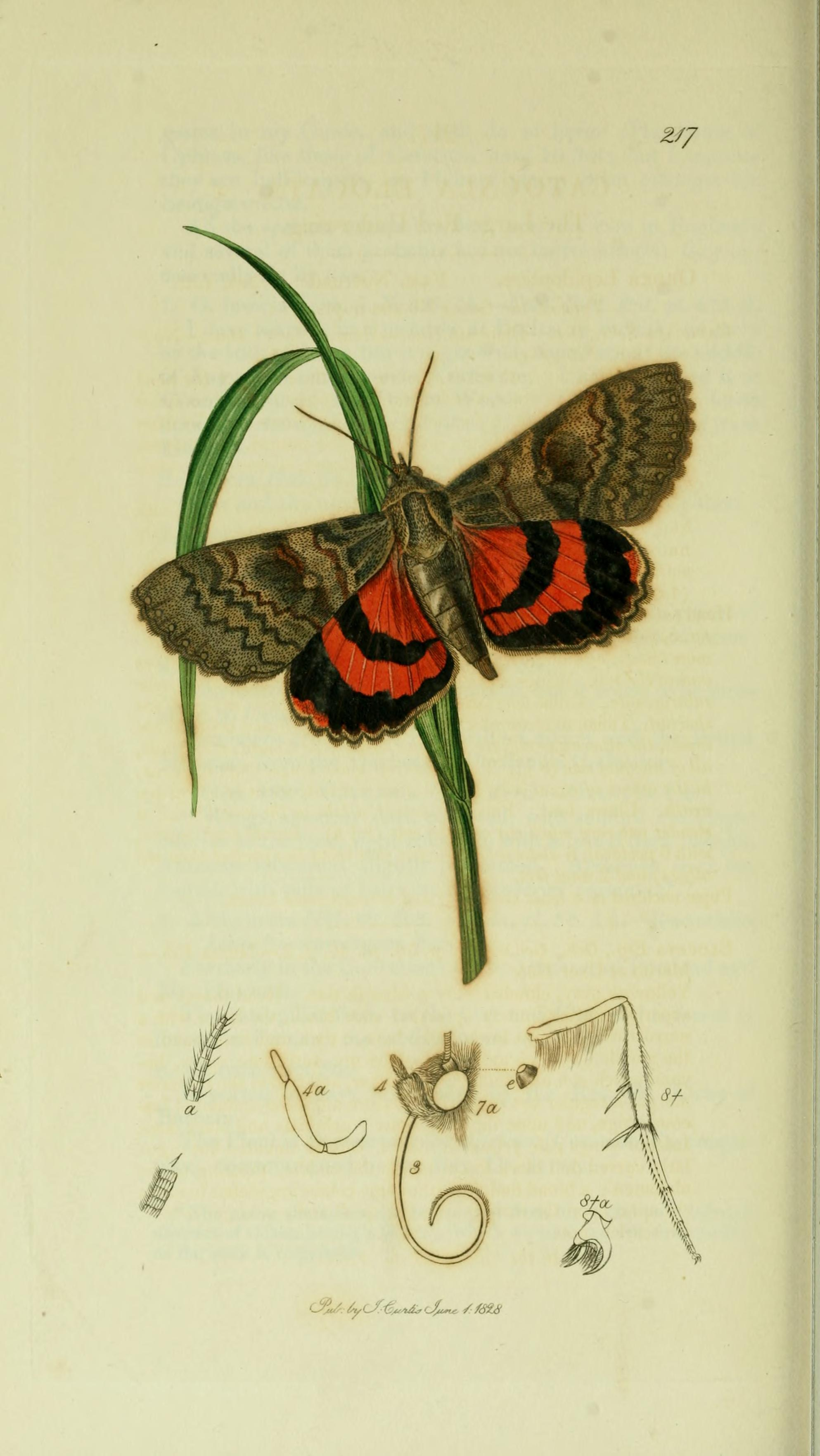
Illustration from John Curtis's British Entomology Volume 5

== Technical description and variation ==
C. nupta L. Forewing pale grey powdered with darker grey, sometimes with dark grey banded suffusion, and in some cases yellowish-tinged; sometimes the cellspace before reniform coalescent with the spot below reniform, and a space along outer line, before it above middle and beyond it below, are all whitish: inner and outer lines double, black and grey; the outer line less oblique below middle and forming two more conspicuous angles on each side of vein 2, the lower one double, then deeply indented along vein 1 median shade generally clear and produced squarely outwards beyond the reniform, which has a thick black central lunule, a curved black inner edge, and a tridentate outer one; subterminal line pale and dark grey, the paler inner portion sometimes whitish; hindwing crimson with a central black band bent on vein 5, and a thick black terminal border, the inner edge of which is waved towards abdominal margin; — in the form concubina Hbn. the red of the hindwing is brighter and the black median band more developed, being broader throughout and continued to inner margin; the lines of forewing blacker and the pale areas generally more developed; the subsp. nuptialis Stgr., from Tibet (Ili, Issyk-kul, Ala Tau) and the Altai Mts., has the forewing paler, more gaily marked, the submarginal line white, sharply edged with black; — the subsp. obscurata Oberth., from Amurland and Askold Island, is a much blacker form than the average European examples, though specimens from several localities in Europe are also dark: — ab. coerulescens Cockerell, named from a single example taken in Essex, has the hindwing blue instead of red; — ab. brunnescens ab. nov. represented by 3 rather small males captured in the neighbourhood of London, has the hindwing dark olive brown; in the ab. languescens ab. nov. the hindwing is yellowish white with a faint pink flush; a line example of this, but without locality label, exists in the Felder Collection, and a similar one is recorded by Mr. Tutt in British Noctuae, Vol. IV, p. 50; like other species with red hindwings nupta has an aberration in which that colour is supplanted by yellow, ab. flava Schultz, to which intermediate forms occur with the red only partially changed to yellow, or yellow only in one hindwing; - in ab. mutilata Schultz the black central band of hindwing is abbreviated and becomes obsolete a little below costa; — ab. fida Schultz differs from typical examples in having between the subterminal line and the termen a conspicuous dentated white line strongly edged with black; this example was from Silesia; — in the ab. dilutior Schultz the ground colour is generally paler, either brownish yellow with the dark markings slightly darker, or whitish grey with a faint yellowish intermixture; — ab. alterata ab. nov. (=ab. 6 Hmps.) has the black bands of hindwing altered to grey. — ab. rubridens ab. nov. shows the red ground colour of the hindwing running out along veins 2 and 1 in the shape of sharp wedge-shaped teeth, almost interrupting the black median band which is swollen between them into a large horseshoe-shaped blotch; the single example in the Tring Museum is unfortunately without locality; — a strange, probably accidental, aberration from Munich, figured as ab. confusa Oberth., has the whole forewing blurred dark grey, with the inner and outer lines and reniform stigma darker but diffuse on a slightly paler median area; the median band of hindwing strongly curved, its outer edge diffuse, and its lower extremity running up. narrowly to inner margin towards base; the black terminal border projecting basewards as long narrow teeth along the veins with the red ground colour running up between them. Larva pale or dark grey; only distinguishable from that of Catocala elocata by the absence of the dark dorsal and lateral bands, which are represented by lines.

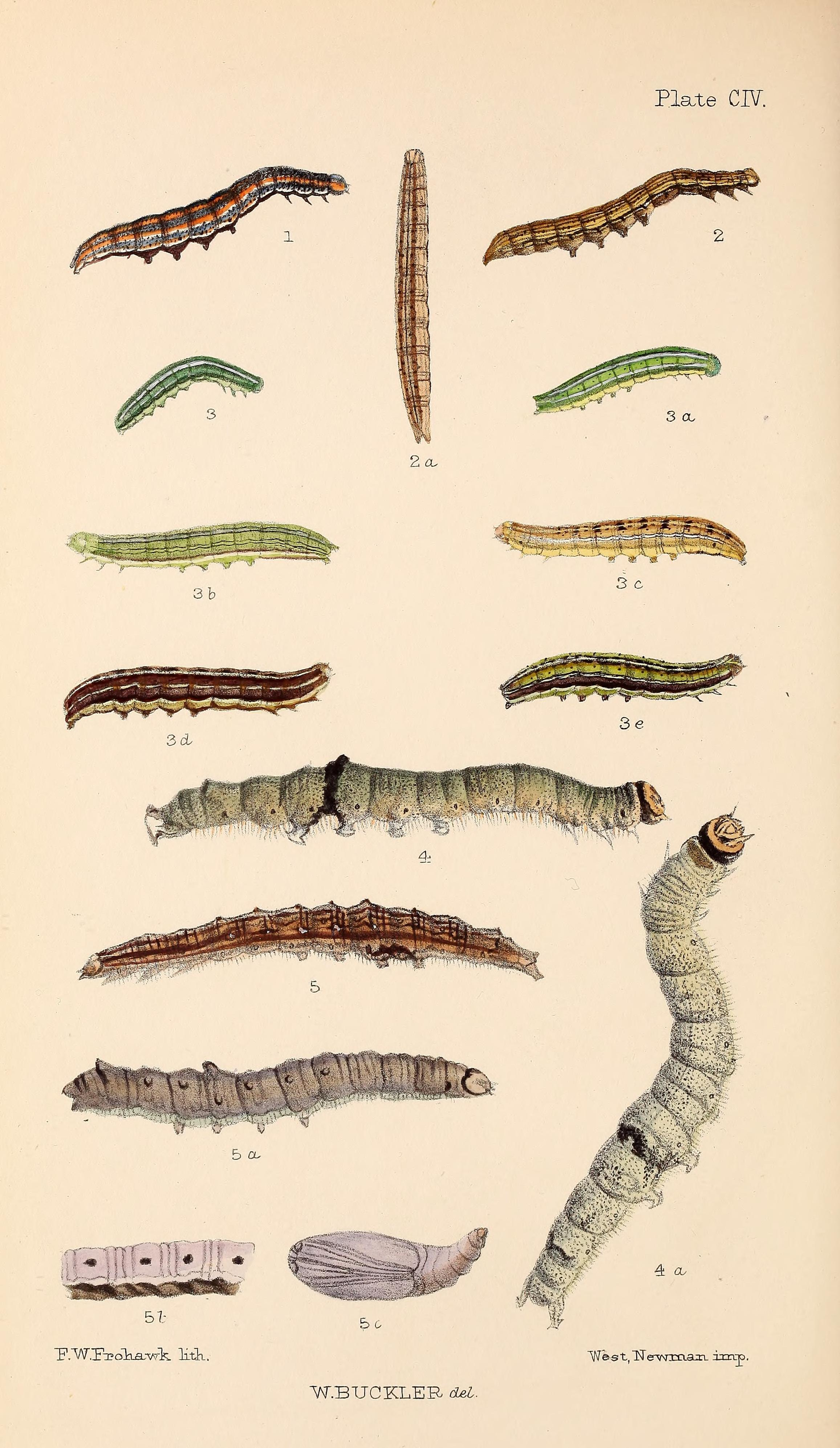
Figs 5, 5a larvae after last moult, 5b flat underside, 5c pupa

== Subspecies ==
- Catocala nupta nupta Europe
- Catocala nupta alticola Mell, 1942 (China: Yunnan)
- Catocala nupta centralasiae Kusnezov, 1903
- Catocala nupta clara Osthelder, 1933 (Turkey)
- Catocala nupta concubia Walker, [1858] (northern Hindostan)
- Catocala nupta japonica Mell, 1936
- Catocala nupta kansuensis O. Bang-Haas, 1927 (China: Kansu)
- Catocala nupta japonica Mell, 1936
- Catocala nupta likiangensis Mell, 1936 (China: Yunnan)
- Catocala nupta nozawae Matsumura, 1911 (Japan)
- Catocala nupta nuptialis Staudinger, 1901 (Altai)
- Catocala nupta obscurata Oberthür, 1880 (south-eastern Siberia)

== Biology ==
The moths fly from mid-July to early October. At night, they fly to light sources, but they usually land slightly away from the light. The caterpillars are gray with a reddish tint and begin feeding in May and end in June. The adult feeds on nectar, the larva eat willow and poplar leaves. They pupate well hidden between spun leaves. Hibernation is as an egg. This species and other Catocala moths have brightly coloured underwings, in this case orange, red, or pink. These are not visible at rest, being hidden by the dull forewings, but they help the moth avoid predators such as birds if it is disturbed during the day. As the red underwing moth takes off, the sudden flash of colour may confuse the attacker, and when it lands and immediately closes its wings it may seem to disappear as the colour is "switched off". It is also thought that the symmetrical patterned orange sections on the rear wings form the illusion of another smaller creature (butterfly), so the attacker will go for the colourful "small illusive" rear safe region on the main body of this red underwing moth species.
