= Søren Hjorth =

Danish railway pioneer and inventor

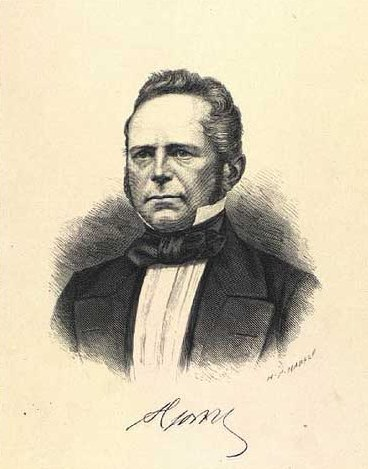
Søren Hjorth by H.P. Hansen.jpg

Søren Hjorth (13 October 1801, in Vesterbygaard at Kalundborg in the west of Zealand (Denmark) – 28 August 1870, in Copenhagen) was a Danish railway pioneer and inventor. Before Werner von Siemens, he discovered the dynamo-electric principle in 1854 and received the first patent for a self-excited dynamo.
