= Friderich Christian Hager =

Danish colonial commander and governor

- Born: 9 February 1756
- Died: August 17, 1795 (aged 39)

Friderich Christian Hager (9 February 1756 – August 17, 1795) was a Danish colonial commander and governor.

Born in Ribe, Hager was the son of the then organist at Ribe Domkirke, Johann Wilhelm Friedrich Hager (1728–1799), and his wife Anna Margrethe Ingwersen (1736–1759). Hager's father later became precentor in Copenhagen and then newspaper publisher in Flensburg and Altona.

F.C. Hager went to Africa in 1774 to work for the Danish Guinesian Company. He became commandant of Fort Fredensborg on the Danish Gold Coast, and assistant governor of the colony. In 1793 he became temporary governor (ad interim) from 27 January to 26 June and again from 8 August. On 11 June 1794 he received a commission as governor. He died in 1795 in Africa, in Christiansborg Castle, near present day Accra shortly before he was to travel home to his Danish fiancée.

== See also ==
- List of colonial heads of the Danish Gold Coast
