= Poul Pagh =

Danish merchant and shipowner

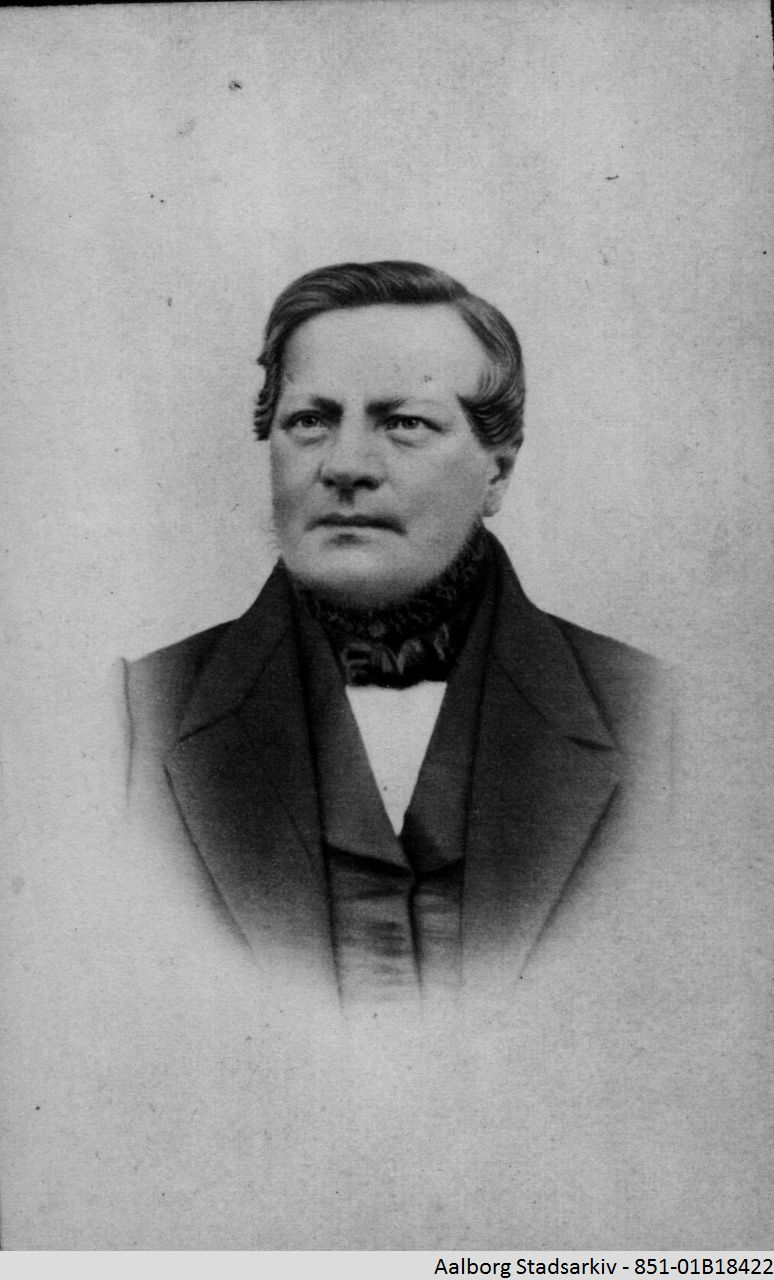
Poul Pagh

Poul Pagh (14 February 1796 – 30 November 1870) was a Danish merchant and shipowner who played an important role in developing industry and commerce in the city of Aalborg. In 1827, he started a thriving trading business based in N.C. Rasch's mansion on the city's Vesterågade waterfront, which had a ferry pier and an inn. He soon became a shipping operator with his own wharfs, including one in Nørresundby, and later developed a successful timber business. In 1857, he converted a local windmill into the first steam-driven mill in the north of Jutland.
