= Sophus August Wilhelm Stein =

Danish physician (1797–1868)

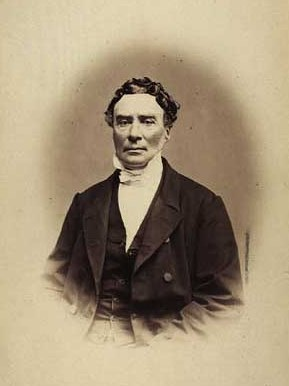
Sophus August Wilhelm Stein

Sophus August Wilhelm Stein ( 29 July 1797, 14 May 1868) was a Danish surgeon and anatomist. He was a father of three sons: Theobald, Waldemar and Harald Stein.

In 1819 August Stein started studying surgery in University of Copenhagen. By 1831 he got a candidate degree, and then, by 1834 a Doctor of Medicine degree. According to Edward G. Jones (1985), his doctoral thesis was the first ever known doctoral thesis, fully dedicated to anatomical structure of the thalamus.

In 1835 August Stein became a professor of anatomy in Danish Royal Academy of Arts in Copenhagen. He held this position till 1868. In 1837 he also became a docent, and in 1841 a full professor of University of Copenhagen, his alma mater. He also served as a Surgeon General in the Fredericks Hospital, Copenhagen, from 1844 to 1854. He was respected for being an excellent teacher, lecturer and very professional surgeon, especially in the field of plastic and reconstructive surgery. He was also well known for his technique of performing caesarean section with minimal risk to both the mother and the fetus.

In 1840 August Stein wrote for the Danish Royal Academy of Arts, where he taught students anatomy, a great handbook on descriptive and surgical anatomy (Danish: Haandbog i Menneskets Anatomi).

== Some published works ==
- Latin: De thalamo et origine nervi optici in homine et animalibus vertebratis: dissertatio anatomica. (The thalamus and the optic chiasm and optic nerves in humans and vertebrate animals. A doctoral thesis.)
- Danish: Haandbog i Menneskets Anatomi. (The Handbook on Anatomy).
