= 1844 in Denmark =

- Decades: 1820s; 1830s; 1840s; 1850s; 1860s
- See also: Other events of 1844; List of years in Denmark

Events from the year 1844 in Denmark.

== Incumbents ==
- Monarch – Christian VIII
- Prime minister – Poul Christian Stemann

== Events ==
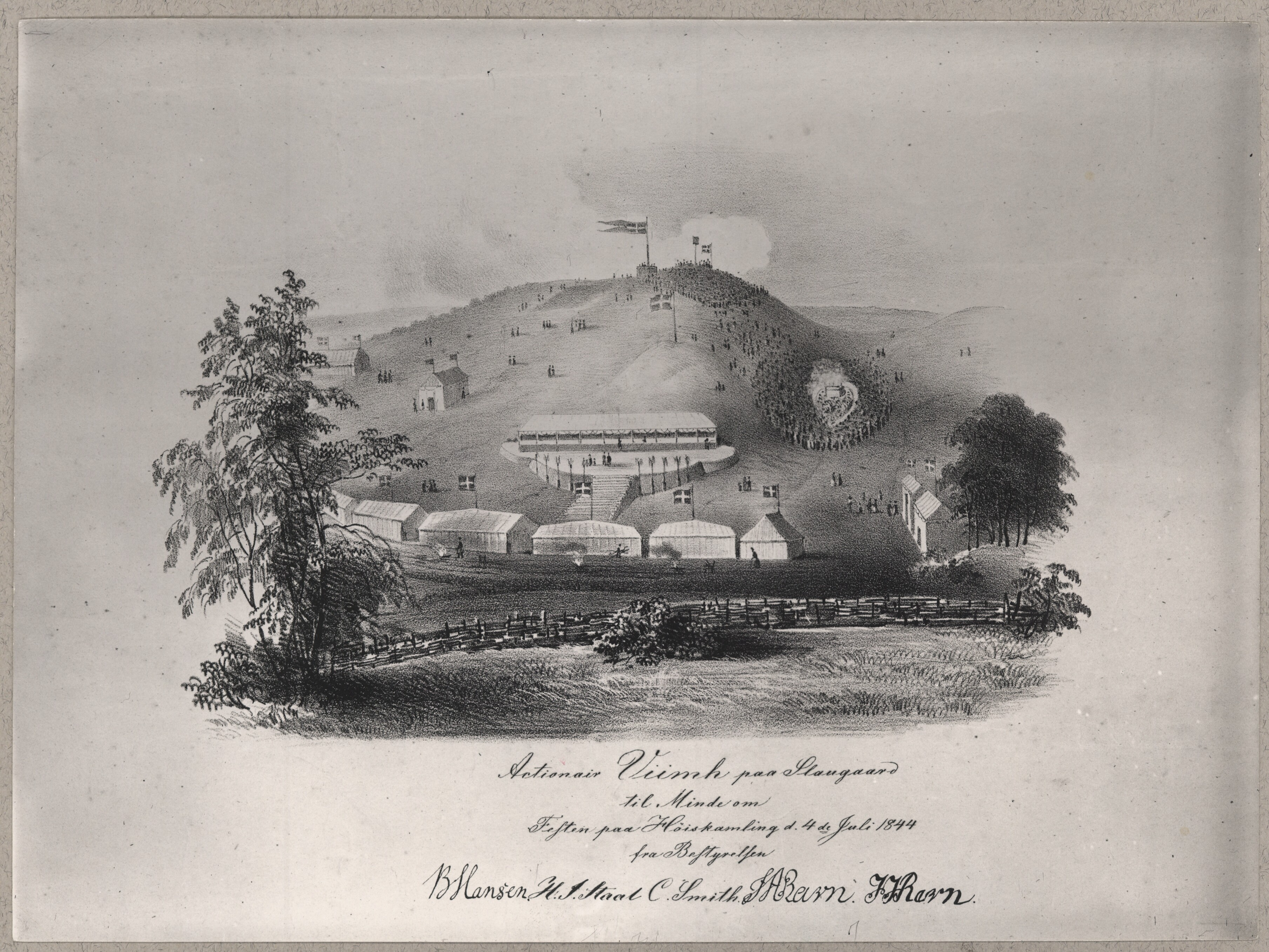
4 July: National Language Meeting at Skamlingsbanken.

- 4 July – A National Language Meeting is held at Skamlingsbanken.

=== Undated ===
- Søren Kierkegaard publishes Philosophical Fragments.

== Culture ==
=== ;usic ===
- 11 June – Hans Christian Lumbye's Telegraph Galop premiers in Tivoli's Concert Hall in Copenhagen.

== Births ==
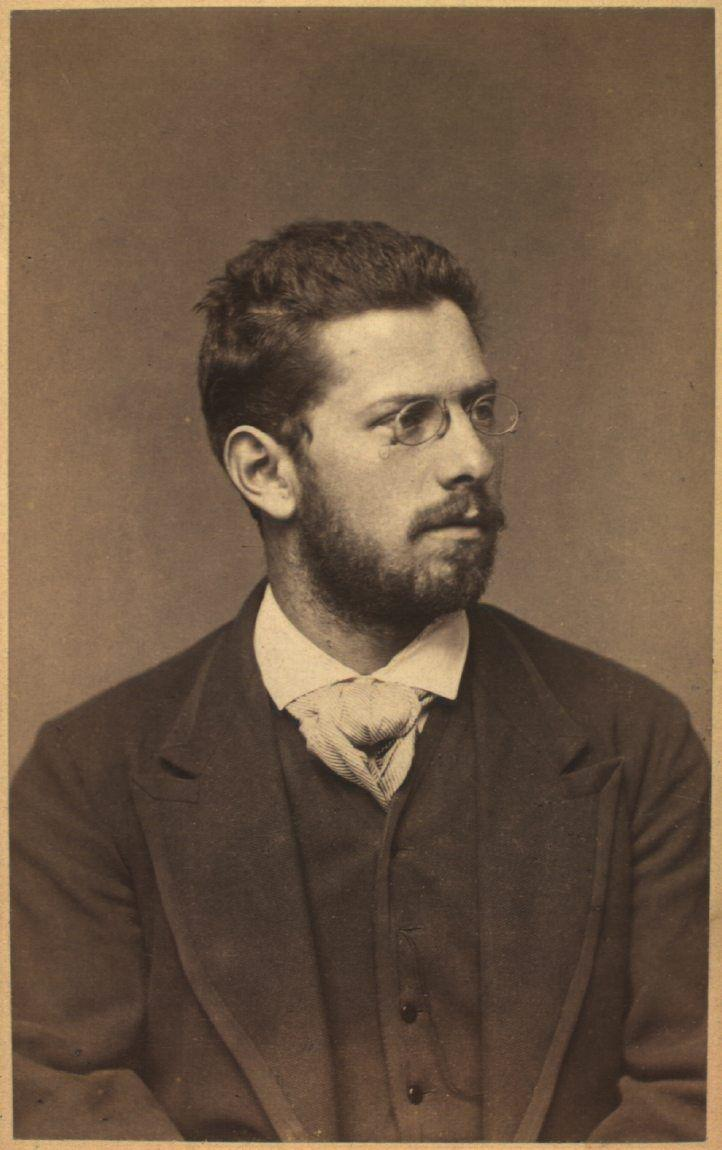
Louis Hasselriis.

=== January–March ===
- 12 January – Louis Hasselriis, sculptor (died 1912)
- 13 January – Peter Gottfred Ramm, military officer, landowner and company founder (died 1917)
- 1 February – Ernst Immanuel Cohen Brandes, economist, writer, and editor (died 1892)

=== April–June ===
- 11 April – Vilhelm Herman Oluf Madsen, politician (died 1917)
- 12 June
  - Klaus Berntsen, politician (died 1927)
  - Oscar Alexander Ræder, writer (died 1877)

=== July–September ===
- 13 July – Laurence Gronlund, lawyer, writer and political activist (died 1899 in the United States)
- 21 August – Carl Feilberg, journalist, editor and political commentator (died 1887 in Australia)
- 20 September – Emilie West, educator (died 1907)

=== October–December ===
- 12 October – Carl Wivel, restaurateur (died 1922)
- 9 November – Andreas Riis Carstensen, painter (died 1906)
- 1 December – Alexandra of Denmark, queen-empress consort of King Edward VII of the United Kingdom (died 1925 in the United Kingdom)
- 4 December – Henrik Franz Alexander von Eggers, soldier, explorer and botanist (died 1903)
- 6 December – Rogert Møller, architect (died 1918)

== Deaths ==
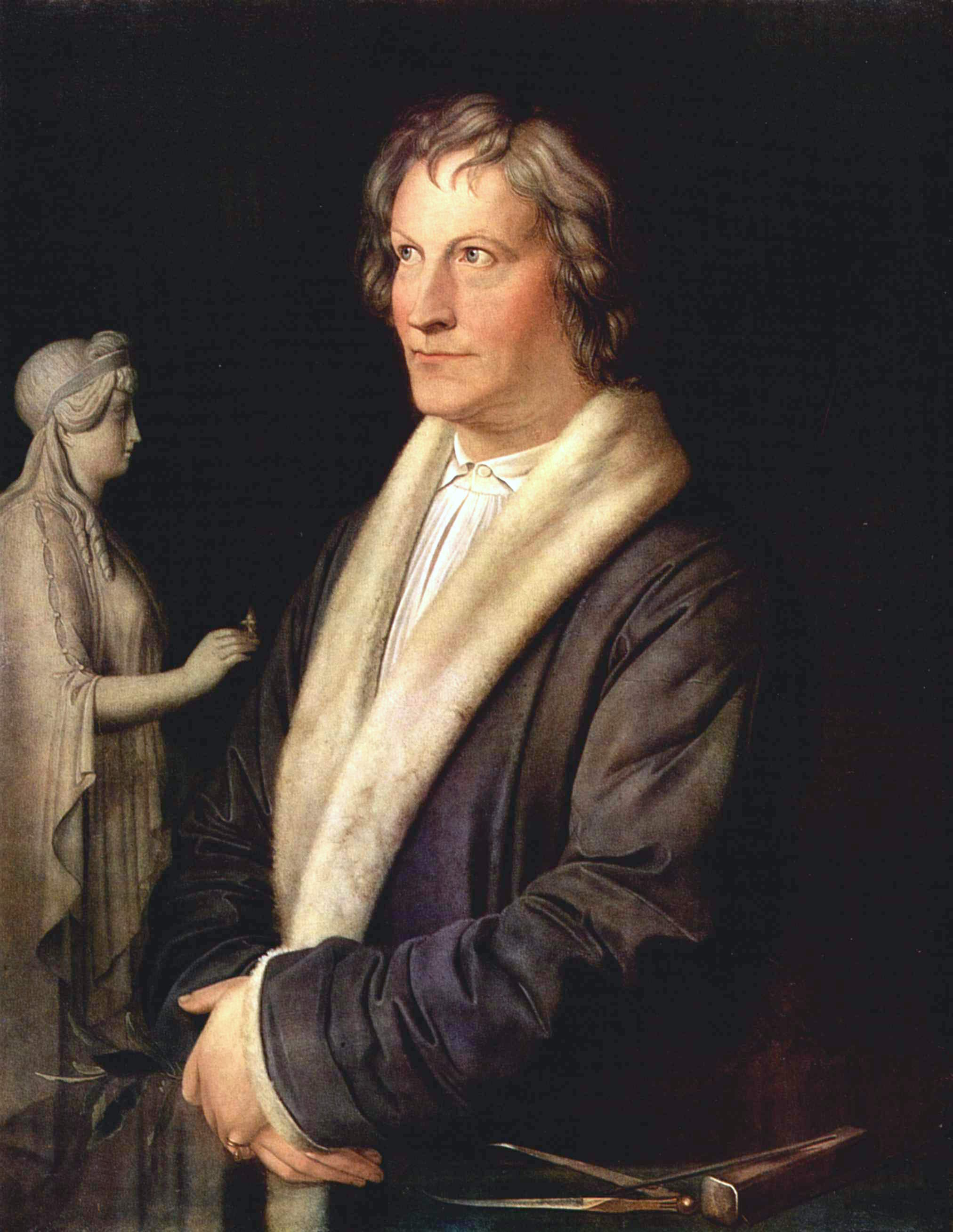
Bertel Thorvaldsen.

- 7 March – Christian Horneman, miniature painter (born 1765)
- 15 March – Adam August Müller, painter (born 1811)
- 24 March – Bertel Thorvaldsen, sculptor (born 1770)
- 6 April – Christian Jacob Theophilus de Meza, physician (born 1756)
- 16 December – Johan Ernst Hartmann, organist and composer (born 1770)
- 24 December – Friedrich Bernhard Westphal, painter (born 1803)
