= Ove Holm =

Danish scout (1894–1969)

Chief Scout of Det Danske Spejderkorps
- In office 1924–1960

Ove Holm (21 January 1894 – 2 December 1969) served as Organizing Secretary and Administrator of the 2nd World Scout Jamboree, held from August 9 to 17, 1924 at Ermelunden, Denmark, and Chief Scout of Det Danske Spejderkorps from 1924 to 1960. He graduated from w:da:Gammel Hellerup Gymnasium in 1912 and was awarded the Bronze Wolf, the only distinction of the World Organization of the Scout Movement, awarded by the World Scout Committee for exceptional services to world Scouting, in 1949.

As early as 1909, Holm was the first patrol leader in Denmark. At his school he discovered Scouting by attending a conference on November 19, 1909, and launched himself with the permission of the rector of his school, based on his reading of Scouting for Boys. Graduating in 1912, he continued Scouting, especially when he taught in his former school. He was editor of the magazine Skonroggen in 1913, and then of the magazine Spejdernes Store in 1916.

He then spent a few years in the United States before returning to Denmark to work for Ford's local subsidiary.

== 2nd World Scout Jamboree ==
Denmark has a comparatively small Scout population and doubts were expressed beforehand as to whether it would be possible for the Danish Scouts to make a success of the undertaking. The main host was Christian Holm, President of Det Danske Spejderkorps, whose daughter became known as Kim, Friend of all the World. The three Scouters responsible for the preparation, organization and administration were very young men, but they made a success of the Jamboree. Ove Holm, later to become Chief Scout of Det Danske Spejderkorps, was the Organizing Secretary and Administrator, Jens Hvass, later a state forester and Divisional Scout Commissioner in North Jutland, was the Camp Chief, and Tage Carstensen, later a lawyer in Jutland, International Commissioner and founder of the Scout Blood Transfusion Service, was in charge of all international aspects.
