= Galop =

Form of dance

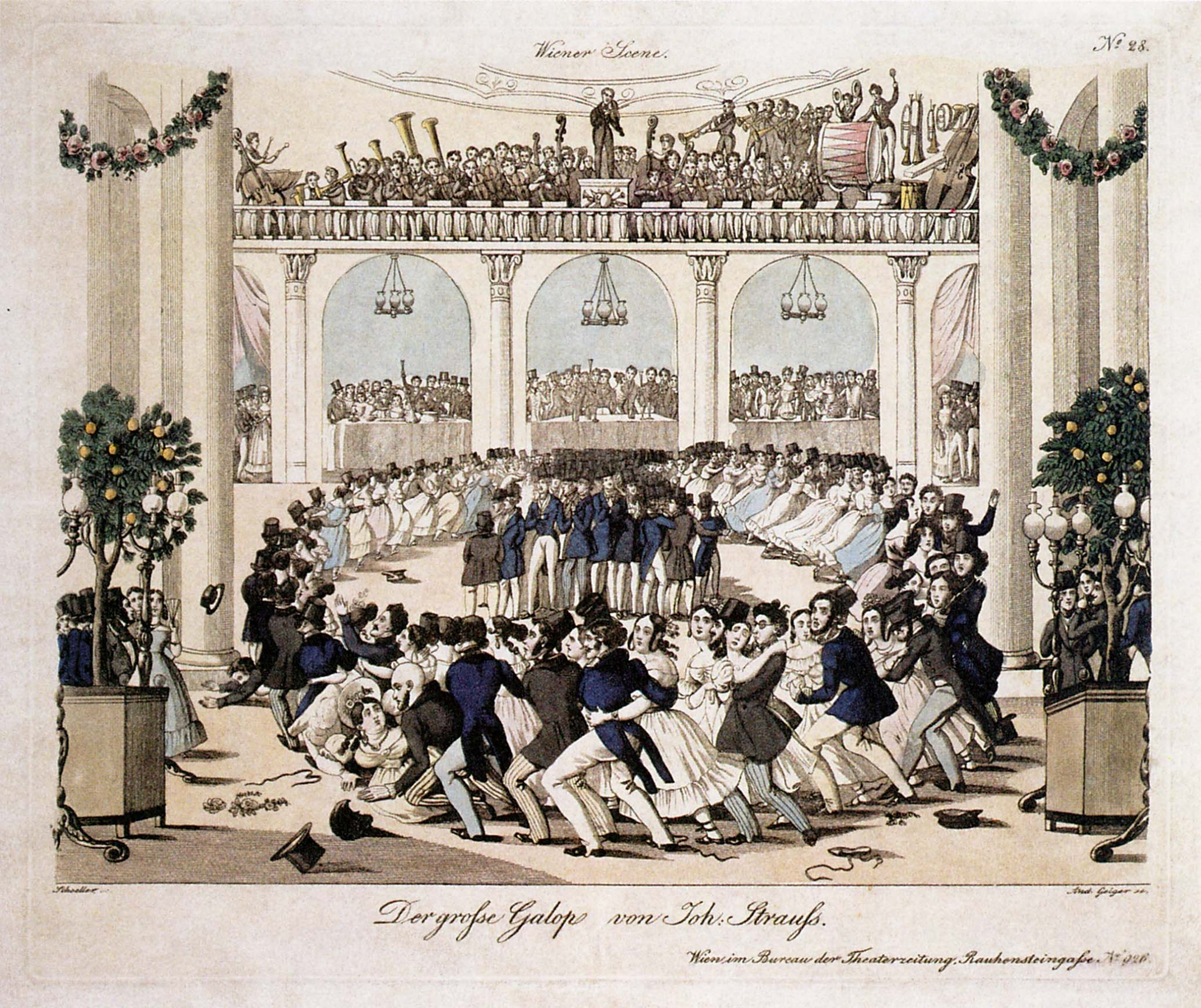
Copper engraving of the "Great Galop" of Johann Strauss (1839).

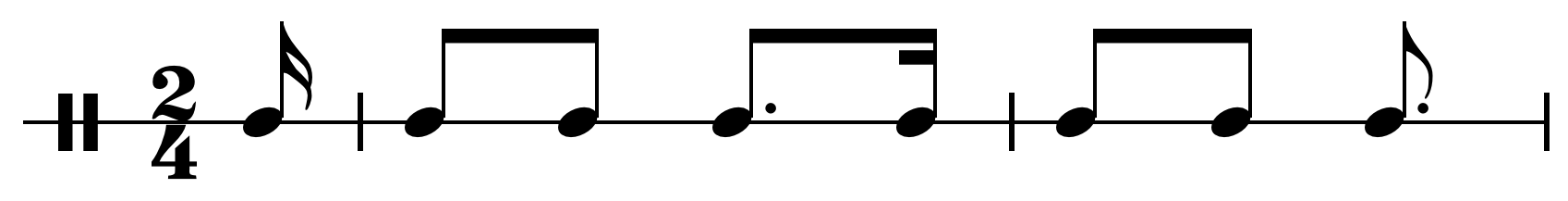
Galop rhythm.

In dance, the galop, named after the fastest running gait of a horse, a shortened version of the original term galoppade, is a lively country dance, introduced in the late 1820s to Parisian society by the Duchesse de Berry and popular in Vienna, Berlin and London. In the same closed position familiar in the waltz, the step combined a glissade with a chassé on alternate feet, ordinarily in a fast 2/4 time.

The galop was a forerunner of the polka, which was introduced in Prague ballrooms in the 1830s and made fashionable in Paris when Raab, a dancing teacher of Prague, danced the polka at the Odéon Theatre in 1840. In Australian bush dance, the dance is often called galopede. An even livelier, faster version of the galop called the can-can developed in Paris around 1830.

The galop was particularly popular as the final dance of the evening. The "Post Horn Galop", written by the cornet virtuoso Herman Koenig, was first performed in London in 1844; it remains a signal that the dancing at a hunt ball or wedding reception is ending.

== Examples ==
- Numerous galops were written by Johann Strauss II.
- Dmitri Shostakovich employed a "posthorn galop" as the second Allegro scherzo of his Eighth Symphony in 1943, and another galop in Act 1, scene 3 of Lady Macbeth of Mtsensk.
- Franz Schubert composed the "Grazer Galopp". He also composed the fourth movement of his Symphony No. 2 as a galop.
- The "Devil's Galop" by Charles Williams
- The "Infernal Galop" from Orpheus in the Underworld by Jacques Offenbach
- The "Comedians' Galop" from The Comedians by Dmitry Kabalevsky
- The "Prestissimo Galop" by Émile Waldteufel.
- The "Malapou Galop" by Joseph Lanner.
- Danish composer Hans Christian Lumbye (1810–1874) wrote several galops, including the "Telegraph Galop" (1844), the "Champagne Galop" (1845) and the "Copenhagen Steam Railway Galop" (1847).
- George Gershwin composed the galop "French Ballet Class" for two pianos in his score for the film Shall We Dance.
- Galops were also written by Nino Rota.
- Franz Liszt wrote some galops for piano, notably the "Grand Galop Chromatique" (1838) and the "Galop in A minor" (1846).
- Csikós Post by Hermann Necke.
- Isaak Dunayevsky wrote some galops, including one for the film "The Son of the Clown" (1950).
