= Christian Holm (Scouting) =

Danish scout

President of Det Danske Spejderkorps

Christian Holm served as President of Det Danske Spejderkorps, and host of the 2nd World Scout Jamboree, held from August 9 to 17, 1924 at Ermelunden, Denmark.

== 2nd World Scout Jamboree ==
Denmark has a comparatively small Scout population; hence, doubts were expressed beforehand as to whether it would be possible for the Danish Scouts to make a success of the undertaking. The main host was Christian Holm, President of Det Danske Spejderkorps, whose daughter became known as Kim, Friend of all the World. The three Scouters responsible for the preparation, organization, and administration were very young men, but they made the Jamboree a success. Ove Holm, later to become Chief Scout of Det Danske Spejderkorps, was the Organizing Secretary and administrator; Jens Hvass, later a state forester and Divisional Scout Commissioner in North Jutland, was the Camp chief; and Tage Carstensen, later a lawyer in Jutland, International Commissioner, and founder of the Scout Blood Transfusion Service, was in charge of all international aspects.
