= Jens Hvass =

Danish scout (1898–1996)

- Occupation: State forester
- Known for: Camp Chief of the 2nd World Scout Jamboree

Jens Hvass (8. April 1898 - 23. February 1996) served as the Camp Chief of the 2nd World Scout Jamboree, held from August 9 to 17, 1924 at Ermelunden, Denmark, and was later a state forester and Divisional Scout Commissioner in Rold Skov, North Jutland, where a jamboree-square can still be found near the Great Økssø.

He was a brother of Danish diplomat Frants Hvass (April 29, 1896 in Copenhagen - 21 December 1982 in Copenhagen) and Danish naturalist Hans Hvass (February 15, 1902 in Copenhagen - March 4, 1990 in Frederiksberg).

== 2nd World Scout Jamboree ==
Denmark has a comparatively small Scout population and doubts were expressed beforehand as to whether it would be possible for the Danish Scouts to make a success of the undertaking. The main host was Christian Holm, President of Det Danske Spejderkorps, whose daughter became known as Kim, Friend of all the World. The three Scouters responsible for the preparation, organization and administration were very young men, but they made a success of the Jamboree. Ove Holm, later to become Chief Scout of Det Danske Spejderkorps, was the Organizing Secretary and Administrator, Jens Hvass, later a state forester and Divisional Scout Commissioner in North Jutland, was the Camp Chief, and Tage Carstensen, later a lawyer in Jutland, International Commissioner and founder of the Scout Blood Transfusion Service, was in charge of all international aspects.

== Later life ==
The previous state forester's initiative was continued in the 1940s by new state forester Hvass. He planted small clusters of large, exotic trees, and over the next 30 years Hvass planted the area with over 100 different trees and shrubs from all over the Northern Hemisphere. Hvass had been away from the admonitions of his superiors for years, and by the inauguration in 1970, the entire project was completed without management's knowledge.

During World War II Hvass saved many people, and after 1945 he devoted himself to the restoration of Scouting in several countries. He spread the idea of Jamborette and was awarded the Bronze Wolf, the only distinction of the World Organization of the Scout Movement, awarded by the World Scout Committee for exceptional services to world Scouting, in 1957.
