= Carstensen =

Carstensen is a patronymic surname. Notable people with the surname include:

- Andreas Riis Carstensen (1844–1906), Danish painter
- Bianca Carstensen (born 1975), Danish rower
- Carl Carstensen (1863–1940), Danish Scouting pioneer
- Christian Carstensen (born 1973), German politician
- Dee Carstensen (born 1956), American singer-songwriter and harpist
- Ebba Carstensen (1885–1967), Danish painter
- Fritze Carstensen (1925–2005), Danish swimmer
- Georg Carstensen (1812–1857), Danish military officer and developer of Tivoli Gardens
- Hans Jacob Carstensen (born 1965), Danish businessman
- Henrik Carstensen (1753–1835), Norwegian businessman, timber merchant and shipowner
- Jacob Carstensen (born 1978), Danish swimmer
- Johannes Carstensen (1924–2010), Danish painter
- Kira Carstensen, documentary filmmaker
- Laura L. Carstensen, American psychologist
- Margit Carstensen (1940–2023), German actress
- Peter Harry Carstensen (born 1947), German politician
- Povl Erik Carstensen (born 1960), Danish comedian, actor and jazz double bassist
- Sandra Carstensen (born 1971), German politician
- Stian Carstensen (born 1971), Norwegian musician
- Tage Carstensen, Danish scouting pioneer
