= 1847 in Denmark =

- Decades: 1820s; 1830s; 1840s; 1850s; 1860s
- See also: Other events of 1847; List of years in Denmark

Events from the year 1847 in Denmark.

== Incumbents ==
- Monarch – Christian VIII
- Prime minister – Poul Christian Stemann

== Events ==
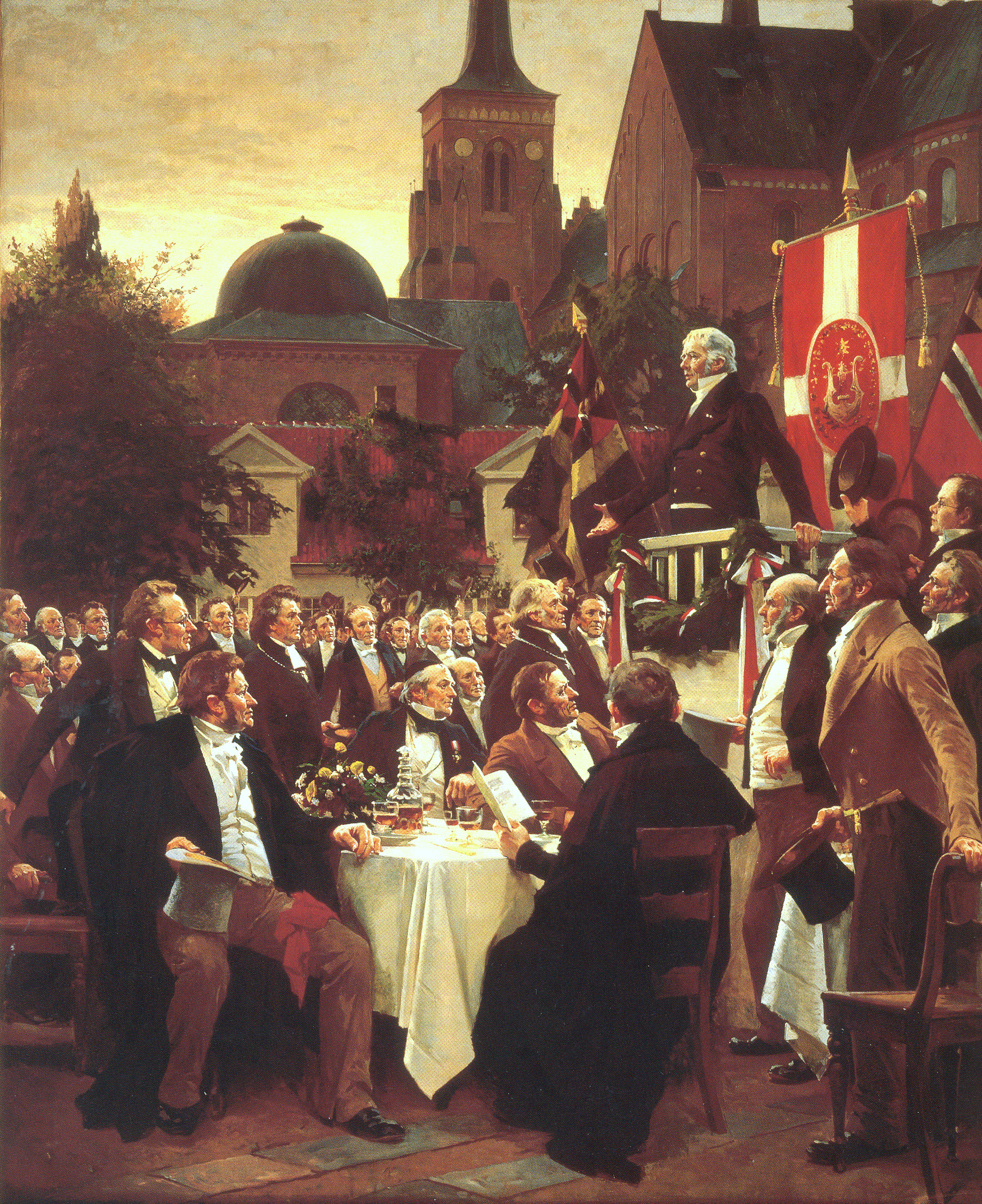
The opening banquet of the 1847 Scandinavian Scientist Conference in Roskilde. H, C, Ørsted is speaking. Wall painting by Erik Henningsen in the aula of the University of Copenhagen.

Hybe

- 26 June – The first railway line in the Kingdom of Denmark, the railway line from Copenhagen to Roskilde, was completed for the Zealand Railway Company (Danish: Det Sjællandske Jernbaneselskab) by British engineering company William Radford.

July

- 12–17 July – The 5th Scandinavian Scientist Conference is held in Copenhagen. The opening banquet is held in the Rotal Mansion in Roskilde.

November

- 10 November – The first beer is brewed at J.C. Jacobsen's new Carlsberg brewery on Valby Hill in Copenhagen.

== Culture ==
=== Art ===
- Wilhelm Marstrand paints his Italian Osteria Scene.

== Births ==
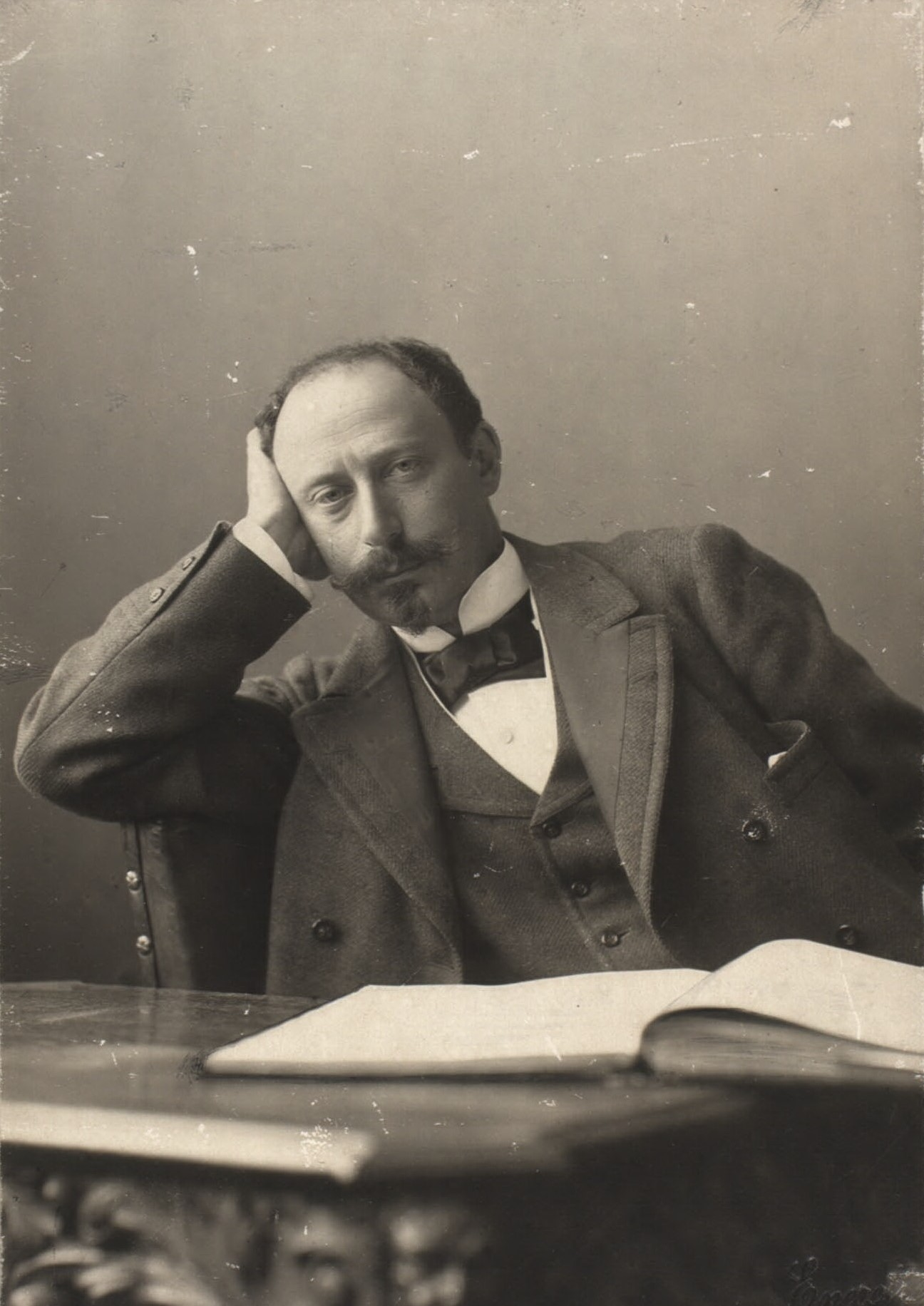
Edvard Brandes.

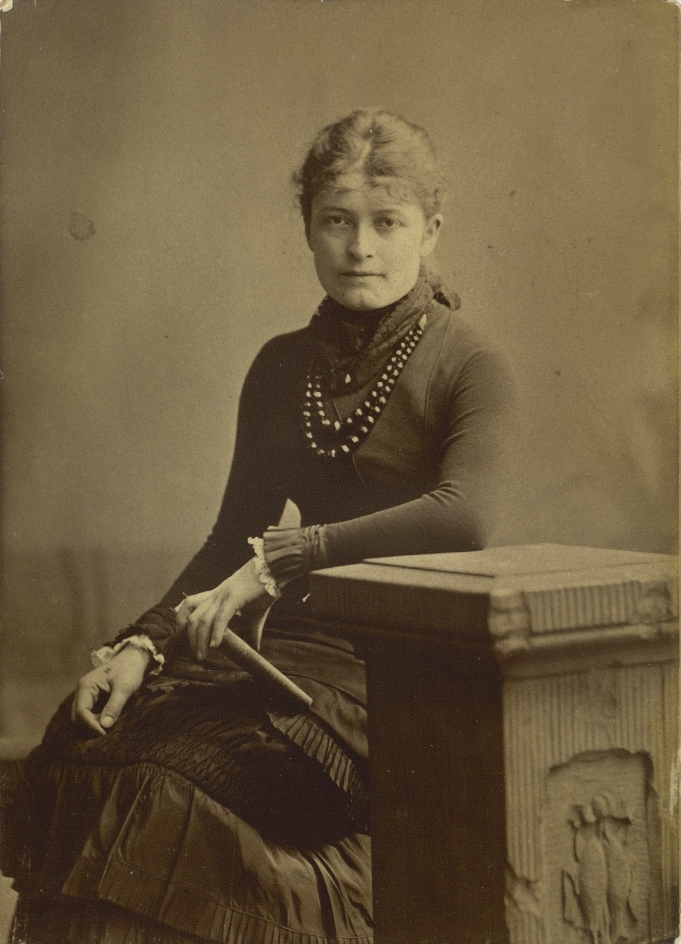
Bertha Wegmann.

=== January–March ===
- 24 February – Charles Ambt, engineer (died 1919)
- 8 March – Anton Marius Andersen, American Lutheran minister (died 1941)

=== April–June ===
- 7 April – Jens Peter Jacobsenm author (born 1885)

=== July–September ===
- 11 April – Axel Helsted, painter (died 1907)
- 23 September – Johanne Christine Petersen, school principal (died 1922)

=== October–December ===
- 13 October – Maria Feodorovna, Empress of Russia (died 1928)
- 21 October – Edvard Brandes, politician, author and editor (died 1931)
- 3 December – Arthur Ivan Allin, musician (died 1926)
- 16 December – Bertha Wegmann, painter (died 1926)
- 25 December – Albert Jensen, architect (died 1913)

== Deaths ==
- 15 May – Peter Johan Alexei Conradt-Eberlin, Supreme Court justice (born 1789)
- 12 November – William Christopher Zeise, chemist (born 1789)
- 17 November – Henriette Jørgensen, actress (born 1791)
- 17 December — Conrad Christian Bøhndel, painter and lithographer (born 1779)
