= 1907 in Denmark =

- Decades: 1880s; 1890s; 1900s; 1910s; 1920s
- See also: Other events of 1907; List of years in Denmark

Events from the year 1907 in Denmark.

== Incumbents ==
- Monarch – Frederick VIII
- Prime minister – J. C. Christensen

== Culture ==
=== Music ===
- 30 November – Carl Nielsen's String Quartet No. 4 is for the first time performed in public in the Odd Fellows Mansion.

== Sports ==
- Dansk Motor Klub is founded.

== Births ==
=== January–March ===
- 4 February – Gwili Andre, model and actress (died 1959)

=== April–July ===
- 19 June – Børge Jessen, mathematician (died 1993)
- 4 July – Henning Holck-Larsen, engineer, co-founder of Indian engineering company Larsen & Toubro (died 2003)

=== October–December ===
- 21 October – Nina Stroganova, a prima ballerina (died in New York, 1994)
- 4 November – Henry Heerup, painter, sculptor (died 1993)
- 12 December – Svend Olufsen, engineer and company founder (died 1949)
- 17 December – Henning Karmark, film producer (died 1989)

== Deaths ==
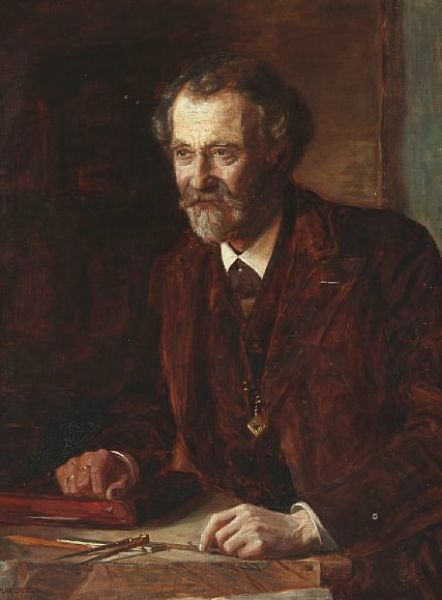
Vilhelm Dahlerup.

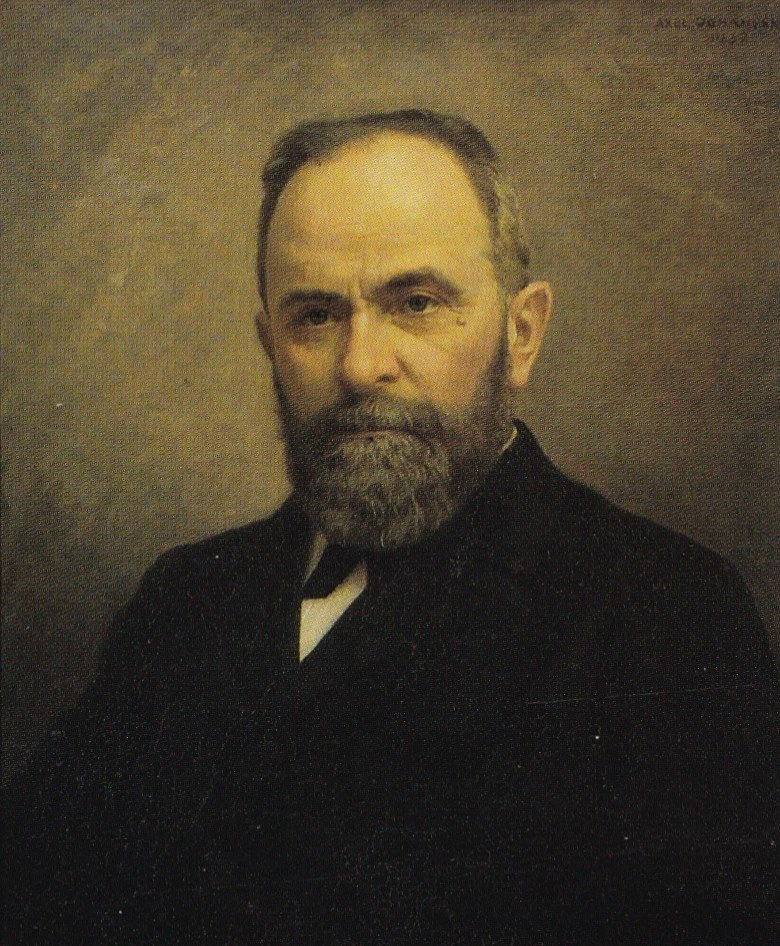
Ditlev Torm.

=== January–March ===
- 16 January – Frederik Georg Emil Rostrup (born 1831)
- 24 January – Vilhelm Dahlerup, architect (born 1836)
- 11 February – Christen Dalsgaard, painter (born 1824)
- 17 February – Axel Helsted, painter (born 1847)

=== April–June ===
- 10 April – Emilie West, educator (born 1844)
- 28 May – Valdemar Tofte, violinist (born 1832)

=== July–September ===
- 10 August – Alfhilda Mechlenburg, writer (died 1830)

=== October–December ===
- 14 November – August Ferdinand Michael van Mehren, philologist (born 1822)
- 22 November – Ditlev Torm, businessman (born 1836)
- 25 November – Ludvig Mylius-Erichsen, arctic explorer, author and ethnologist (born 1872)
