= Tage Carstensen =

Danish member of World Scout Association

International Commissioner of Det Danske Spejderkorps

Tage Carstensen was in charge of all international aspects of the 2nd World Scout Jamboree, held from August 9 to 17, 1924 at Ermelunden, Denmark. He later served as a lawyer in Jutland, International Commissioner of Det Danske Spejderkorps, and founder of the Scout Blood Transfusion Service.

Even before the Scouts started the first Scout blood donor corps there were volunteer blood donors in Denmark, but it was the young Scout leader, barrister Tage Carstensen who in 1930 brought the idea of a voluntary Scout blood donor corps to Denmark. During a trip to England, he had made acquaintance with English Scouts who were blood donors, and he wrote to his Scout friends around Denmark to get them to start a donor corps. The first Scout donation took place on May 21, 1932. During the first year there were 53 blood donors in Denmark, who gave 33 units of blood. It was believed at the time that the 200 donors was enough to cover the future need for blood. On 17 April 1937, the banquet hall of da:KFUM-borgen was used for the award of bronze plaques for the first 6 Danish blood donors who had given blood 10 times. It was a feast for 300 donors, led by Scout Blood Transfusion Service chairman Tage Carstensen.

== 2nd World Scout Jamboree ==
Denmark has a comparatively small Scout population and doubts were expressed beforehand as to whether it would be possible for the Danish Scouts to make a success of the undertaking. The main host was Christian Holm, President of Det Danske Spejderkorps, whose daughter became known as Kim, Friend of all the World. The three Scouters responsible for the preparation, organization and administration were very young men, but they made a success of the Jamboree. Ove Holm, later to become Chief Scout of Det Danske Spejderkorps, was the Organizing Secretary and Administrator, Jens Hvass, later a state forester and Divisional Scout Commissioner in North Jutland, was the Camp Chief, and Tage Carstensen, later a lawyer in Jutland, International Commissioner and founder of the Scout Blood Transfusion Service, was in charge of all international aspects.
