= 2nd World Scout Jamboree =

International Scout jamboree held in Ermelunden, Denmark in August 1924

- 2nd World Scout Jamboree
- Location: Ermelunden
- Country: Denmark
- Coordinates: 55.771551°N 12.542299°E
- Date: 1924
- Attendance: 4,549 Scouts
| Previous; 1st World Scout Jamboree | Next; 3rd World Scout Jamboree |

The 2nd World Scout Jamboree was held from August 9 to 17, 1924, and was hosted by Denmark at Ermelunden.

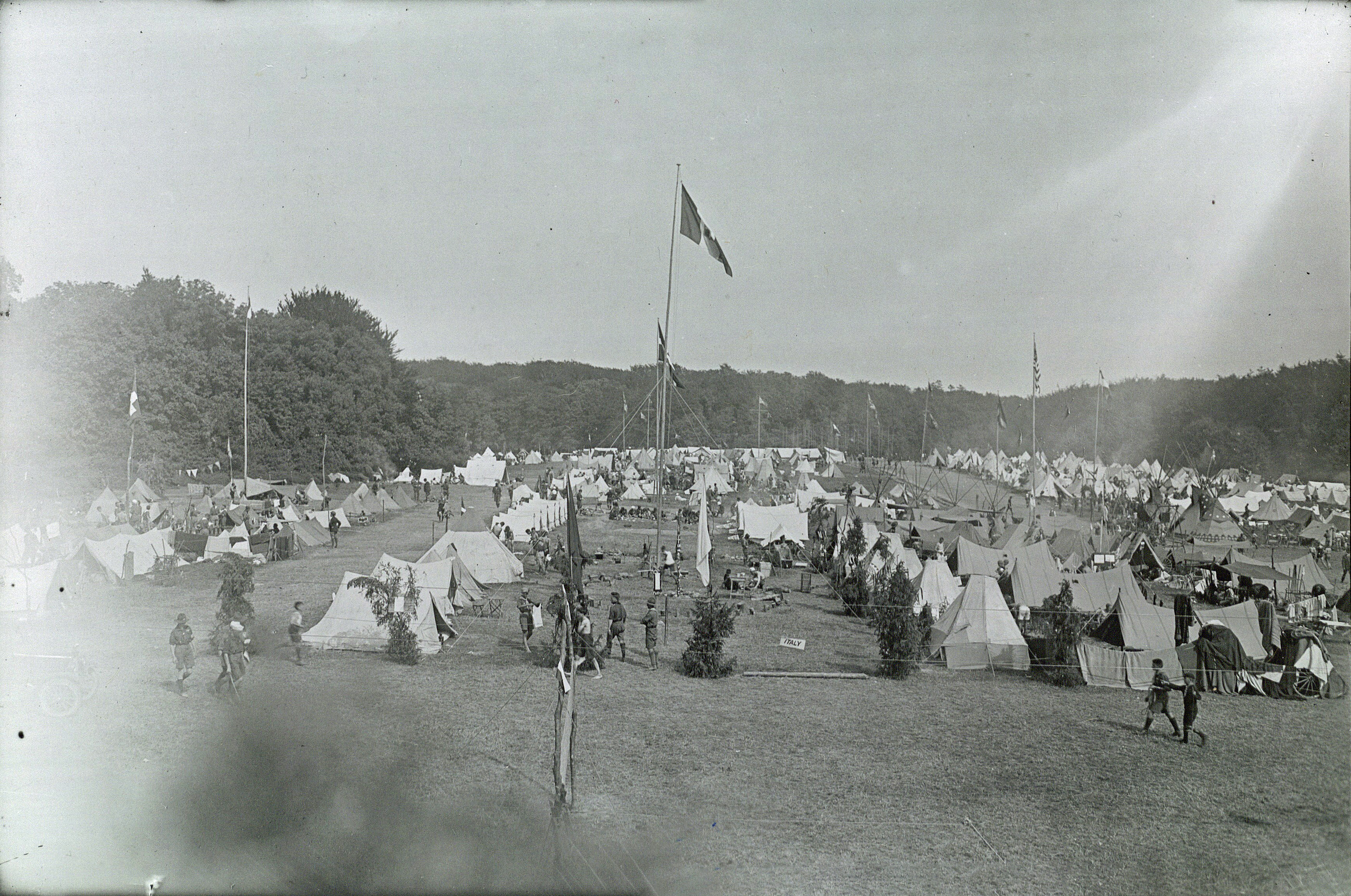
A view of the camp, with the scouts of Italy, center.

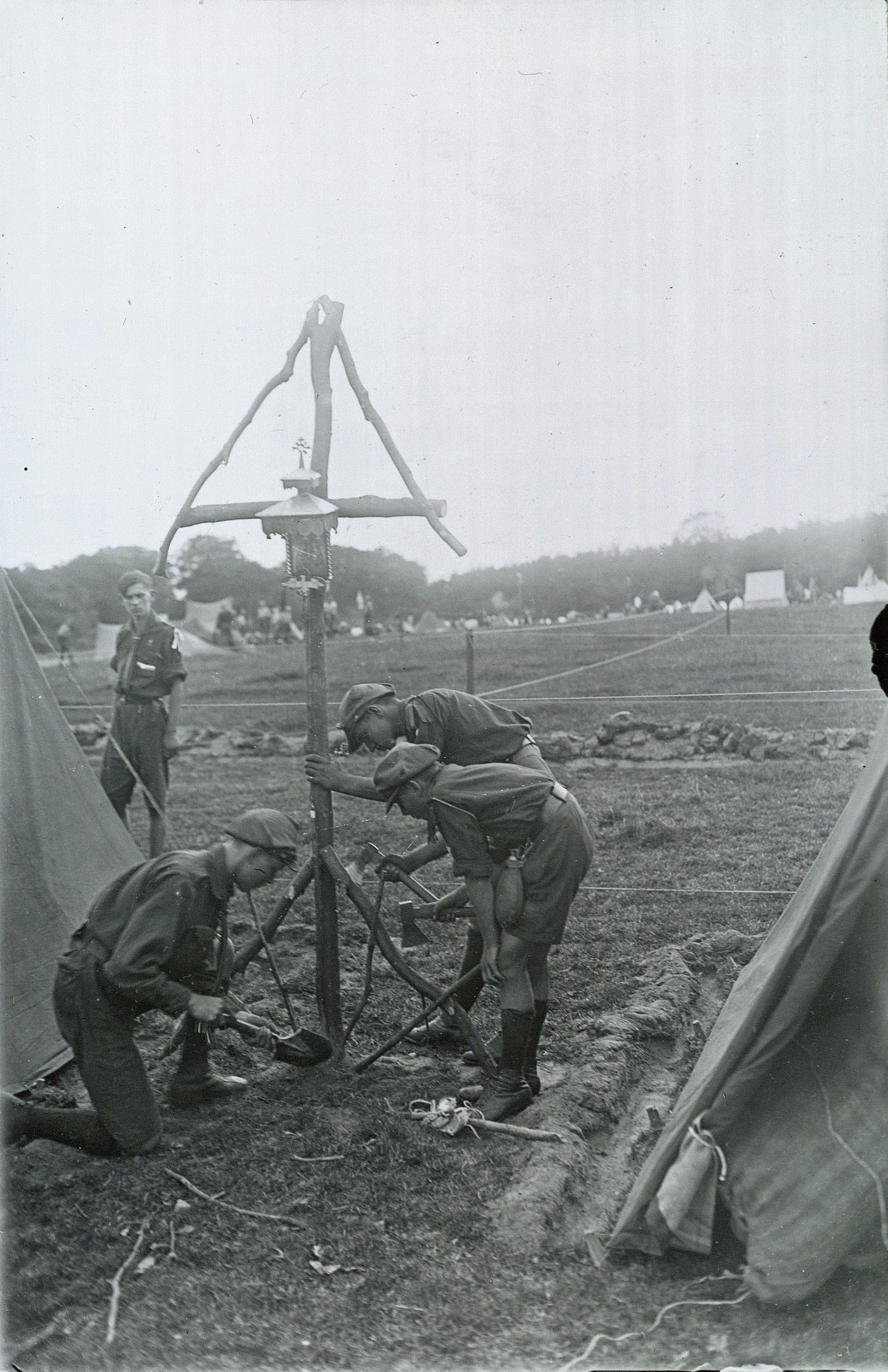
Polish scouts at work.

== Prologue ==
Great Britain held an Imperial Jamboree at Wembley, Middlesex at the beginning of August 1924, in connection with the British Empire Exhibition. Over 1,000 Scouts from 25 parts of the Commonwealth and Empire accepted the invitation. 10,000 Scouts were present from the United Kingdom. The displays and ceremonies took place in Wembley Stadium. The Scouts were camped nearby in Wembley Paddocks in very cramped quarters. The Prince of Wales witnessed the displays in the stadium, presided at a campfire and stayed the night at a tent in the Paddocks. On different days the chief guests in the stadium were the Duke of York and Rudyard Kipling, on the Wolf Cubs' Day, when he saw how parts of his Jungle Books were dramatized and used to bring atmosphere and interest into the Cub program.

== Jamboree ==
The Wembley Jamboree helped to provide a wider variety of members at the Second World Jamboree at Ermelunden, a few miles north of Copenhagen, Denmark, which immediately followed it. Denmark has a comparatively small Scout population and doubts were expressed beforehand as to whether it would be possible for the Danish Scouts to make a success of the undertaking. The main host was Christian Holm, President of Det Danske Spejderkorps, whose daughter became known as Kim, Friend of all the World. The three Scouters responsible for the preparation, organization and administration were very young men, but they made a success of the Jamboree. Ove Holm, later to become Chief Scout of Det Danske Spejderkorps, was the Organizing Secretary and Administrator, Jens Hvass, later a state forester and Divisional Scout Commissioner in North Jutland, was the Camp Chief, and Tage Carstensen, later a lawyer in Jutland, International Commissioner and founder of the Scout Blood Transfusion Service, was in charge of all international aspects.

The Second World Jamboree was officially opened on August 10, 1924, by Rear-Admiral Carl Carstensen, acting as the personal representative of King Christian X. Fourteen countries entered composite troops for the World Scout Championship, a test of Scoutcraft and stamina which continued throughout the week, and included camp inspections, hygiene, discipline, campfire songs and yells, folk dancing, swimming, handicraft, an obstacle course and patrol hike. The Boy Scouts of America won the competition, Great Britain came second and Hungary third. It was decided, however, not to renewing the idea, for fears that nationalism could harm Scout brotherhood.

Lord Baden-Powell arrived at the Jamboree after opening day and was received by a welcoming parade of all the Scouts. Just as he was about to speak, rain came down in torrents and everyone was soaked. The name given him was Bademester, Danish for "Bath Superintendent." On the final Sunday the Scouts were inspected near the royal hunting lodge by King Christian in the pouring rain, and that afternoon Baden-Powell presented the competition prizes, saying "I have seen great numbers of Scouts in my life, but I have never seen any as wet as you are!" Because of the floods one part of the camp even had to evacuate temporarily.

King Christian X and Queen Alexandrine took part in the closing ceremony of the Jamboree. The Third International Conference was held concurrently in Copenhagen.

Contrasting with the 1st World Scout Jamboree in Olympia Hall, the Danish Scouts wanted everyone placed in tents, and the Scouts were organized in troops and patrols, the model used thereafter. The Scouts homestayed with Danish families during the week after the jamboree.

== See also ==
- World Scout Jamboree
