= Green Scouts =

Green Scouts can refer to:

- Green Scouting
- De grønne pigespejdere (The Green Girl Guides), \member of the World Association of Girl Guides and Girl Scouts via Pigespejdernes Fællesråd Danmark. The word green refers to the colour of the Guides' uniforms, and is not a political statement.
- Abkhazian Green Scouts Youth Organization, Abkhazia, Georgia
- Global Movement of Green Scouts, New Delhi, India
