= Pleasure Train =

Pleasure Train may refer to:

- Pleasure Train (album), a 1978 album by Teri DeSario
- Pleasure Train (film), a 1924 Italian silent film
- Vergnügungszug (Pleasure Train), an 1864 polka composed by Johann Strauss II
