= De Gule Spejdere i Danmark – Baden-Powell spejderne =

De Gule Spejdere i Danmark — Baden-Powell spejderne
- Country: Denmark
- Founded: 1984
- Membership: Around 1000
- Chief Scout: Stinus Andersen
- Affiliation: World Federation of Independent Scouts
- Website http://gulspejder.dk/

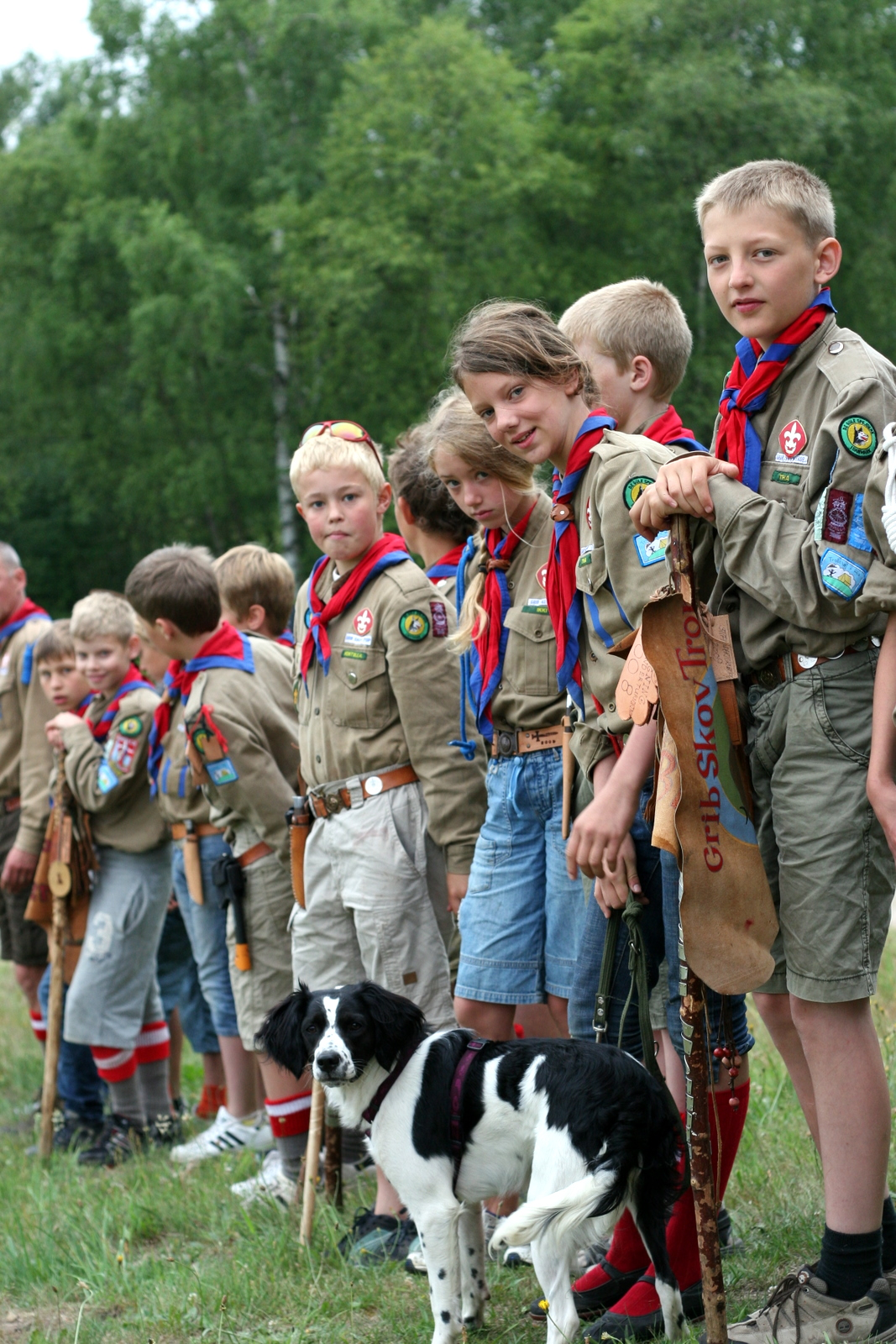
Gule Spejdere members.

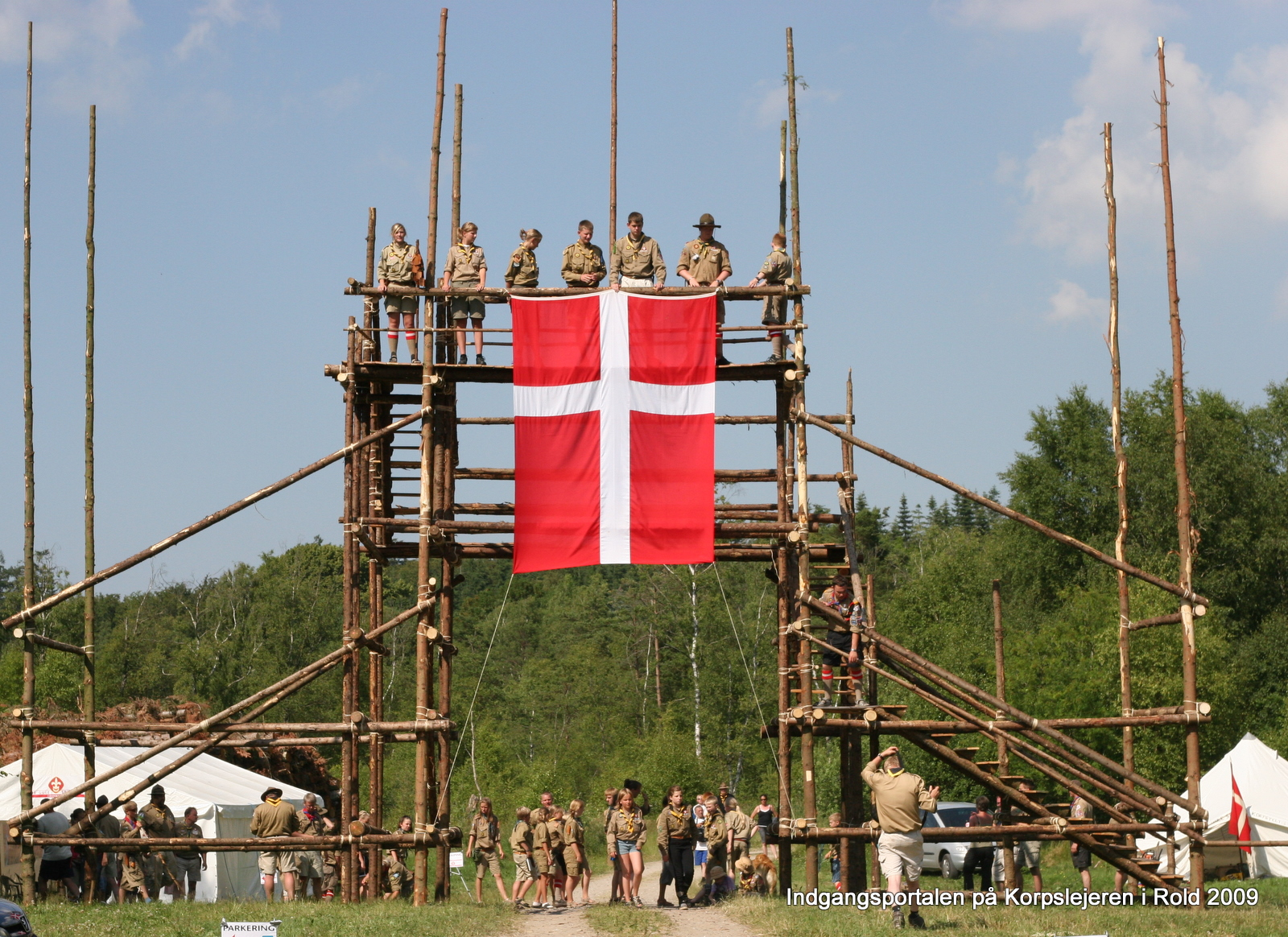
Gule Spejdere camp gateway.

The Yellow Scouts of Denmark — Baden-Powell Scouts (De Gule Spejdere i Danmark) were founded on 25 February 1984 as "Det Danske Pige- og Drenge Spejderkorps" with the aim of returning to a more traditional Scouting approach as a response to changes in the mainstream Danish Scouting movement.

In 1985 the name of the Association was changed to "De Gule Spejdere i Danmark — Baden-Powell spejderne". It currently has 17 Groups. In addition to being members of the World Federation of Independent Scouts they are members of the Danish Youth Council (DUF) which is an umbrella organization of democratic, community groups working with children and youth.

== Sections ==
The Gule Spejdere Groups are divided into sections, with each section serving a different age range of children, youths or adults.

Section	Ages	Controlled by	Activities
Ulvegrenen (Wolves)	7–10	Group	Inspired by Kipling's The Jungle Book .
Stifindere (Indians)	10–12	Group	Inspired by North American Indians, concentrating on outdoors and camping skills.
Spejdertroppen (Scouts)	12–18	Group	The main Scout section, based on the patrol system.
Pionererne (Pioneers)	18–24	Group	This section is used to develop Scouting and leadership skills.
Roverklanen (Rover Scouts)	25+	Group	For those over 25 who wish to remain in Scouting — with no upper age limit.

== Promise ==
On my honor I promise to do my best
To be faithful to my country,
Be helpful at all times
And to keep the Scout Law.

== Scout Law ==
- En spejder er til at stole på (A Scout is to be trusted)
- En spejder er hjælpsom og en god kammerat (A Scout is helpful and a good friend)
- En spejder er god mod dyr (A Scout is good to animals)
- En spejder tager vanskeligheder med godt humør (A Scout takes difficulties in a good mood)
- En spejder er ren i tanke, ord og handling (A Scout is clean in thought, word and deed)

== See also ==
- Scouting and Guiding in Denmark
