= Telegraph Galop =

Musical composition by Hans Christian Lumbye

- by Hans Christian Lumbye
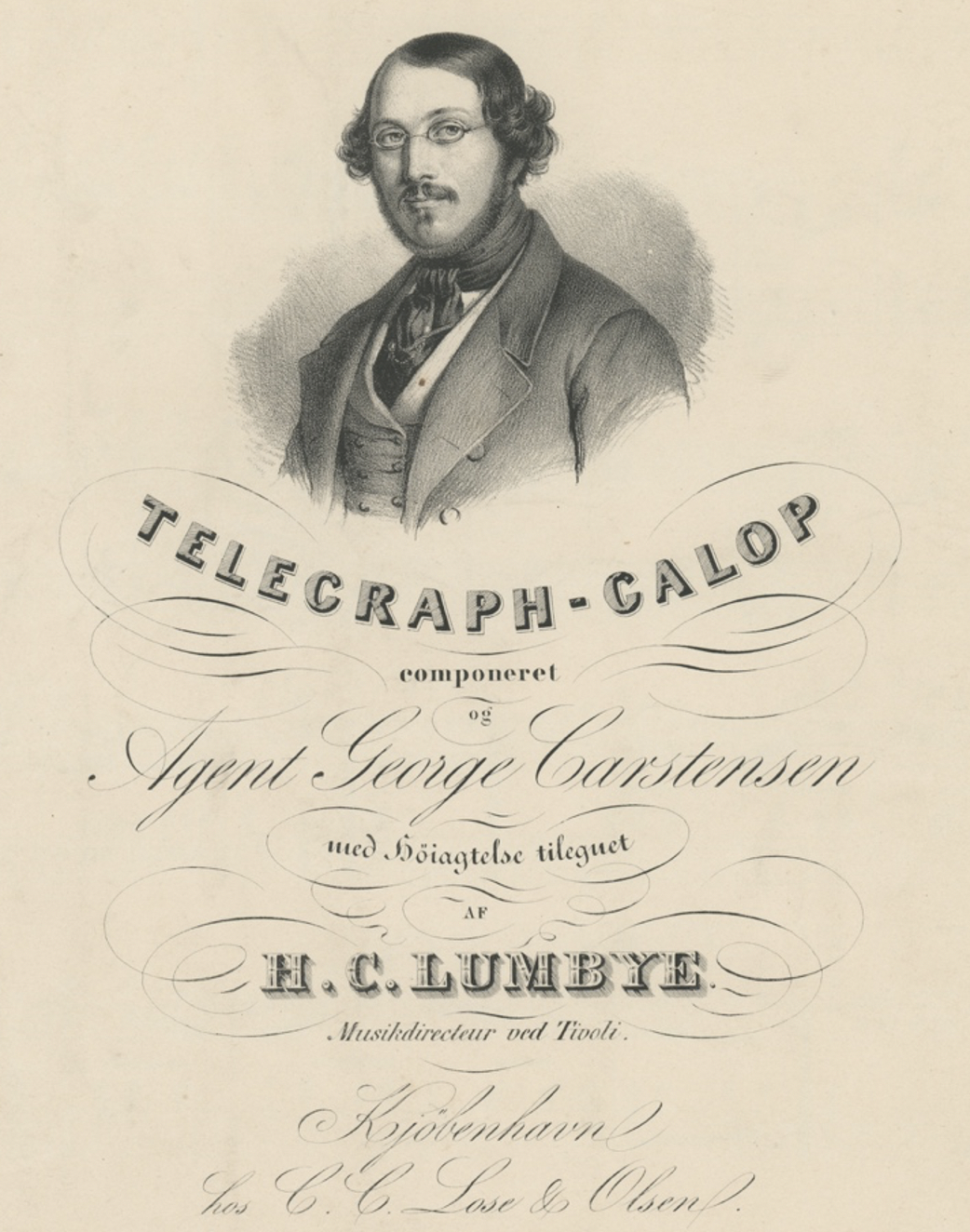
- English: Telegraph Galop
- Native name: Telegraph-Galop
- Genre: Orchestral music
- Performed: 11 June 1844: Tivoli, Copenhagen
- Published: 1844:

The Telegraph Galop (Danish: Telegrafgalopen) is a musical composition by the Danish composer Hans Christian Lumbye (1810–1874).

It is one of Hans Christian Lumbye's best known and popular works, and together with Lumbye's Copenhagen Steam Railway Galop and Champagne Galop, it was included in the 2006 Danish Culture Canon as a masterpiece of Danish classical music.

== History ==
The Telegraph Gallop premiered in Tivoli’s Concert Hall on 11 June 1844. It is dedicated, on the printed piano edition of the work, to Tivoli-founder ]Georg Carstensen "with the utmost respect”. The gallop soon became one of Lumbye’s most popular works.
