= Vergnügungszug =

Polka composed by Johann Strauss II

Vergnügungszug (Pleasure Train), op. 281 is a polka composed by Johann Strauss II in 1864. It was written for the Association of Industrial Societies' Ball held in the Redoutensaal on 19 January 1864 and was inspired by the opening of the Austrian Southern Railway – the Südbahn – which operated many 'pleasure trains' offering trips from Vienna to the countryside.

Strauss was not the first composer to write a piece celebrating technological innovation. Much earlier Hans Christian Lumbye, the popular Danish composer, had written his Kjøbenhjavns Jernbane-Damp-Galop (Copenhagen Railway Steam Galop), while Johann Strauss I celebrated the opening of the first Austrian steam railway on 14 November 1837 between the Viennese suburbs of Floridsdorf and Deutsch Wagram with his appropriately titled waltz Eisenbahn-Lust Walzer (Railway Joy Waltz) op. 89. Eduard Strauss, too, wrote his famous quick polka Bahn Frei (Track Clear) op. 45, another piece celebrating the opening of a new railway line.

Johann Strauss II's vividly descriptive polka, however, is remarkable for its use of triangles in imitation of train bells and of horns to suggest the chuffing of the train. In the trio section the melody constantly hints of the train's progression. The polka, like the train's journey, has to end, however, and Strauss powers home the conclusion with high chords before a resounding flourish underlined by a powerful roll on snaredrum.

Although many of Strauss's works commemorate travel and other forms of transport, neither he nor his brother eagerly undertook extensive journeys. One anecdote states that Johann himself was terrified at the mere mention of the overhanging precipices at the Semmering Pass and later during a railway trip he made to Boston in the 1870s as part of a concert tour of the United States, his wife Henrietta Treffz noted that Strauss confessed he would rather die than be forced take another trip on the American railroad. Many (unsubstantiated) stories suggest that Strauss was so terrified of rail travel that he spent train journeys huddled on the carriage floor.
