= Carl Carstensen =

- Born: 1863
- Died: 1940 (aged 76–77)
- Military career
- Rank: Rear-Admiral

Rear-Admiral Carl Vilhelm Edvard Carstensen (1863–1940), acting as the personal representative of King Christian X of Denmark, officially opened the 2nd World Scout Jamboree on 10 August 1924, held from 9 to 17 August 1924 at Ermelunden, Denmark.

Born to William August Carstensen (2 December 1828 in Algiers – 16 February 1909 in Fredensborg), a Danish naval officer and politician, one of his uncles was Johan Bernhard Georg Carstensen, a Danish army officer and one of the developers of Tivoli Gardens. He was buried in Hellerup Cemetery.

== 2nd World Scout Jamboree ==
The Second World Jamboree was officially opened on 10 August 1924 by Rear-Admiral Carl Carstensen, acting as the personal representative of King Christian X. Fourteen countries entered composite troops for the World Scout Championship, a test of Scoutcraft and stamina which continued throughout the week, and included camp inspections, hygiene, discipline, campfire songs and yells, folk dancing, swimming, handicraft, an obstacle course and patrol hike. The Boy Scouts of America won the competition, Great Britain came second and Hungary third. It was decided, however, not to renewing the idea, for fears that nationalism could harm Scout brotherhood.
