= Pigespejdernes Fællesråd Danmark =

- Country: Denmark
- Founded: 1923
- Membership: 22,090
- President: Princess Benedikte of Denmark
- Affiliation: World Association of Girl Guides and Girl Scouts
- Website pigespejdernesfællesråd.dk

Pigespejdernes Fællesråd Danmark (PFD, The Joint Committee of Girl Guides in Denmark) is the national Guiding federation of Denmark. Danish Guiding started in 1910, the PFD was founded in 1923 and was among the founding members of the World Association of Girl Guides and Girl Scouts in 1928. The federation serves 18,893 Guides (as of 2008). Føroya Skótaráð left the federation to become a full member of WAGGGS representing the Faroe Islands in June 2026.

== Member associations ==
Full members of the federation are

- Danske Baptisters Spejderkorps (DBS, Danish Baptist Scout Association, coed)
- De grønne pigespejdere (The Green Girl Guides - YWCA, girls only)
- Det Danske Spejderkorps (DDS, The Danish Guide and Scout Association, interreligious, coed)
- Kalaallit Nunaanni Spejderit Kattufiat - Grønlands Spejderkorps (Scout Association of Greenland, interreligious, coed)

Observer status within the federation have:

- Dansk Spejderkorps Sydslesvig, affiliated to DDS
- Føroya Skótaráð
  - Føroya KFUK Skótar
  - Føroya Skótasamband
- Metodistkirkens Spejdere i Danmark, associated to KFUM-Spejderne i Danmark

== Jamboree Denmark 2012 ==
A Jamboree took place near Holstebro in July 2012, run jointly by member organizations of the PFD as well as the Danish Scout Council. 35,000 Scouts are expected to attend.

== Emblems ==
Det Danske Spejderkorps

De grønne pigespejdere

Føroya KFUK Skótar

== See also ==
- Scouting and Guiding in Denmark
