= Johanne Christine Petersen =

Danish school principal (1847–1922)

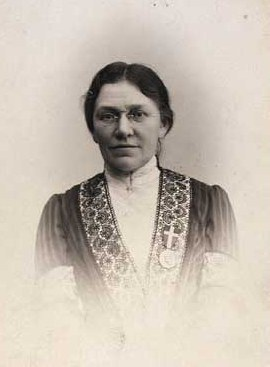
Johanne Petersen photographed by Mary Steen

Johanne Christine Petersen often simply known as Johanne Petersen (23 September 1847 – 24 March 1922) was a Danish school principal. She is remembered for her pioneering work with handicapped children. From 1874, she was associated with Hjemmet for Vanfore (Home for the Handicapped), later known as Samfundet og Hjemmet for Vanføre (Society and Home for the Handicapped), serving as head from 1886 to 1922. Initially opened for one-armed girls, the institution was extended to accommodate boys from 1878. Over the years the institution was significantly expanded. Petersen was awarded the Gold Medal of Merit in 1897.

== Early life, family and education ==
Born in Copenhagen on 23 September 1847, Johanne Christine Petersen was the daughter of the master shoemaker Jens Bent Petersen (1821–1904) and Wilhelmine Christine née Fristrup (1815–85). Brought up in a well-to-do family of craftsmen, she was a weak child and as a result probably received no formal education. By contrast, her younger sister Henriette (1850–1924) was well educated and become Denmark's first female headmistress.

== Career ==
While hospitalized at the Diakonissestiftelsen around 1870, Petersen met the institution's pastor Hans Knudsen who informed her of his plans to create a home for handicapped children where they could be trained to become active members of society. After founding Hjemmet for Vanfore in 1872, he persuaded Petersen to work there in 1874 when she became head of the one-armed girls' school attached to the clinic. When Knudsen died in February 1886, she became his successor.

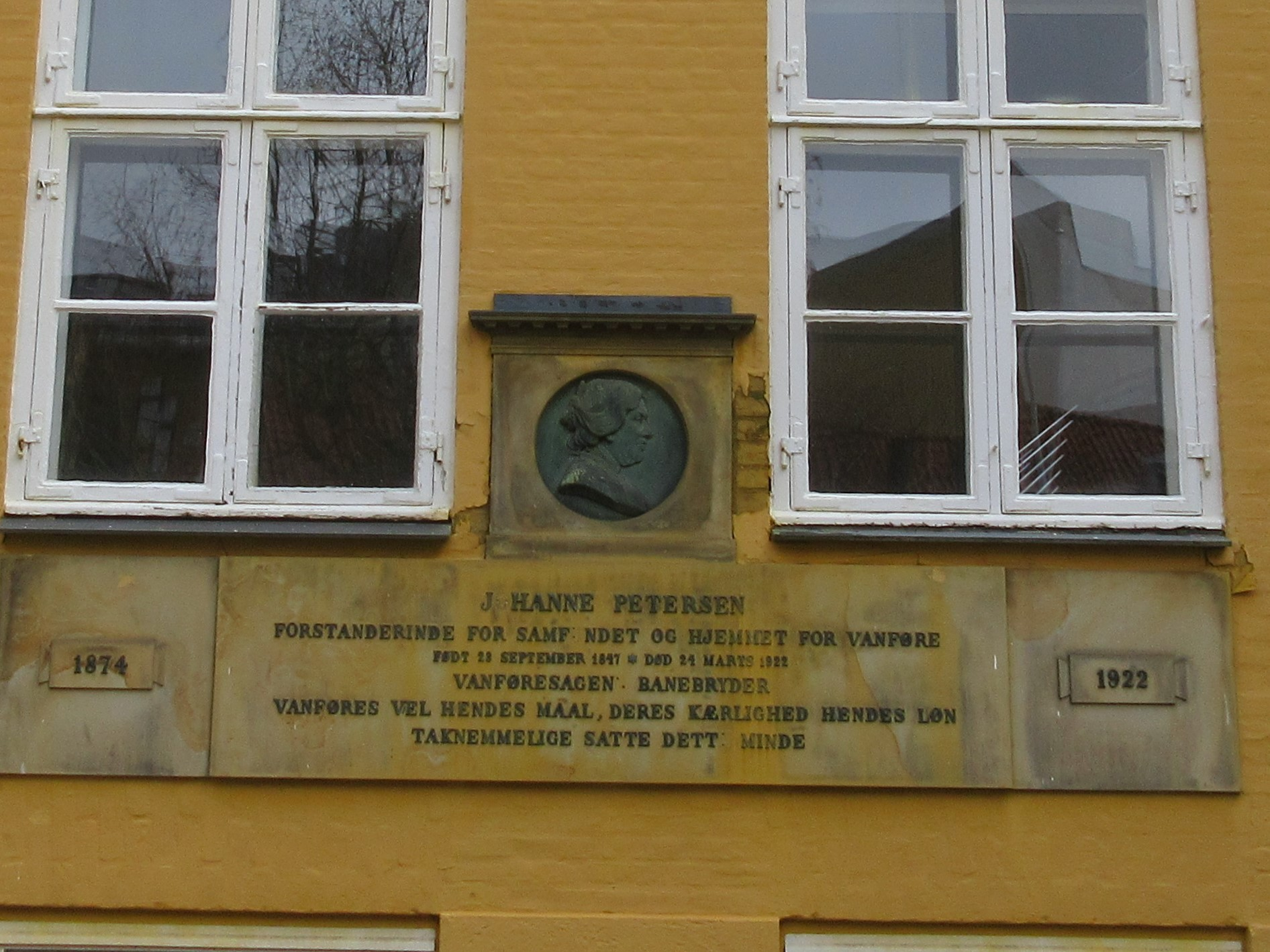
Commemorative plaque at Esplanaden 32 in Copenhagen.

Petersen introduced innovations such as a specially designed sewing desk, facilitating the children's training as they learnt to produce saleable goods. Over the years the institution was expanded to include a students' home, an evening school, a children's home, a school department and a sanatorium. For her outstanding contributions to disability work, Petersen was awarded the Gold Medal of Merit in 1897.

Johanne Petersen died in Copenhagen on 24 March 1922. A commemorative plaque and a portrait relief from 1912 by Anne Marie Carl-Nielsen were installed on the society's building at Esplanaden 32–34 in the same year.
