= Copenhagen Steam Railway Galop =

Musical composition by Hans Christian Lumbye

- by Hans Christian Lumbye
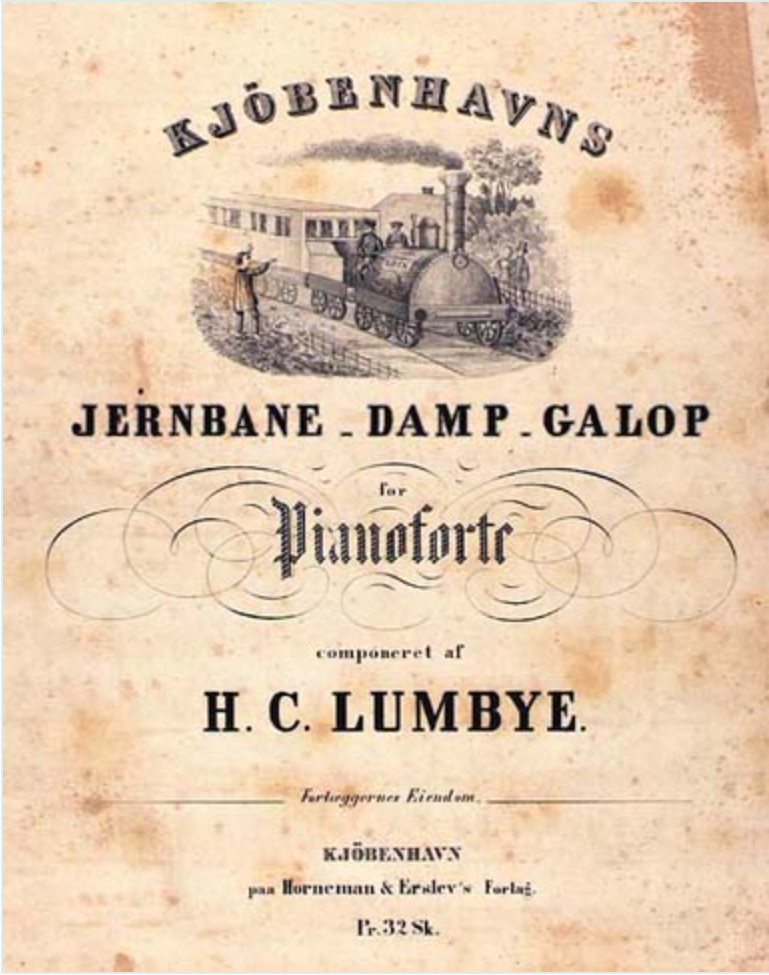
- English: Copenhagen Steam Railway Galop
- Native name: Kjöbenhavns Jernbane-Damp-Galop
- Genre: Orchestral music
- Performed: 29 June 1847: Tivoli, Copenhagen
- Published: 18 June 1847:

The Copenhagen Steam Railway Galop (Danish: Kjöbenhavns Jernbane-Damp-Galop), often just called the Railway Galop (Danish: Jernbanegaloppen), is a musical composition by the Danish composer Hans Christian Lumbye (1810–1874) which was written to celebrate the opening of the Copenhagen–Roskilde railway line in 1847.

It is one of Hans Christian Lumbye's best known and popular works, and together with Lumbye's Telegraph Galop and Champagne Galop, it was included in the 2006 Danish Culture Canon as a masterpiece of Danish classical music.

== Background ==
The Copenhagen Steam Railway Galop was composed for the opening of the Copenhagen–Roskilde railway line on 26 June 1847, the first railway line in the Kingdom of Denmark. The piece was performed for the first time on 29 June in Tivoli Gardens in Copenhagen.

== Description ==
The piece is a good example of the entertaining music Lumbye liked to compose. It faithfully recreates the sounds of a steam locomotive chugging out of a station and grinding to a halt at the next stop, traditionally ending with the cry "Next stop Roskilde - the train does not go any further".

== Popularity ==
For a long time popular in Denmark, the piece has in recent years gained increasing popularity and was featured in the Vienna New Year's Concert in 2012, and again in 2026. It has also been recorded multiple times, being included on over 20 albums. In addition, the piece is a prominent feature of the popular Swedish TV game show På Spåret.

== See also ==
- Vergnügungszug – a polka composed by Johann Strauss II in 1864 inspired by the opening of the Austrian Southern Railway
