= Scouting and Guiding in Newfoundland and Labrador =

Scouting and Guiding in Newfoundland and Labrador has a long history, from the 1900s to the present day, serving thousands of youth in programs that suit the environment in which they live.

== Early Boy Scouts in Newfoundland ==
There is a record of the Church Scout Patrols and Church Lads Brigade Scouts in Newfoundland. The British Boy Scouts also had an early presence. There is also a record of the Life-Saving Scouts and Guards of the Salvation Army.

== Scouts Canada in Newfoundland and Labrador ==
The Boy Scouts Association of the United Kingdom registered scouts in Newfoundland. After 1949, these came under The Boy Scouts Association's Canadian General Council which was later named Boy Scouts of Canada and is now Scouts Canada.

Scouts Canada's Newfoundland and Labrador Council administers the organization's operations in Newfoundland and Labrador.

=== Area Councils ===
Northeast Avalon Region Zone 3 (Central)

== Girl Guiding in Newfoundland and Labrador ==
In 1918 Newfoundland's first Guide Company was formed, although the province itself did not become part of Canada until 1949. Guides are served by the Guiding in Canada - Newfoundland & Labrador Council.

== Other Scouting Associations ==
Canada has several associations which trace their roots to the Baden-Powell Scouts in the United Kingdom. They form the Canadian Federation of Independent Scouting, which is a member of the World Federation of Independent Scouts. Members of the federation include BPSA - Newfoundland and Labrador.

During the Cold War, there were American Boy Scouts (and Girl Scouts) in Goose Bay, linked to the Direct Service branch of the Boy Scouts of America, which supports units around the world. American Scouting at Ernest Harmon Air Force Base Troop 6 under the guidance of Ed Zeidler and Sgt. Henry Erben (the survival trainer for the first seven astronauts) was the furthest east BSA troop in North America. The Scout camp was eleven miles outside the base. The Scout troop ended with the base in 1966.

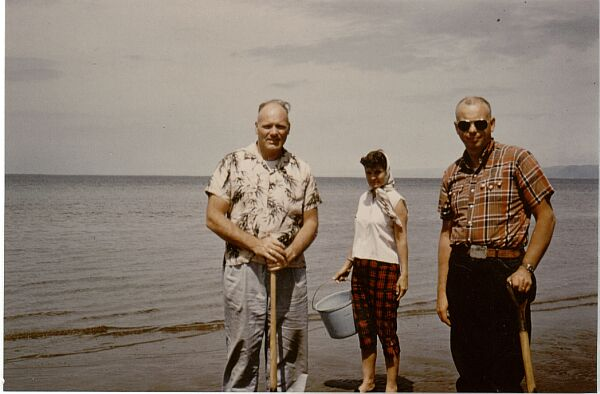
Ed Zeidler and Sgt. Henry Erben

== Emblems ==
Labrador

Newfoundland and Labrador

Newfoundland and Labrador Council

== See also ==
- Greenland Guide and Scout Association
Scouting and Guiding in Canada's provinces and territories
