= Dansk Motor Klub =

Dansk Motor Klub (DMK) is the oldest motorsports club in Denmark.

== History ==
Dansk Motor Klub was founded as Motorcycleklubben in 1907 at the initiative of the businessman Carl Johan Janssen. The name was changed to Dansk Motor Klub in 1921. Its first president was captain G. Rosenkrone von Benzon in 1907 in response to the increasing number of automobiles and motorcycles in Denmark. The club grew in membership and in 1914 was the country's largest motorsport club. In the same year, the club organized a large motor exhibition in Tivoli. Later, the club organized several motor races, including the well-known Skagen Races in collaboration with the daily newspaper Politiken.

Prince Axel, grandson of King Christian IX, was an enthusiastic member of the club from a very early stage. He was later created an honorary member of DMK.

In 1915, Politiken journalist Alfred Nervø succeeded Rosencrone von Benzon as president. As early as 1910, he had flown from Kløvermarken over Copenhagen together with the humorist and writer Robert Storm Petersen. In 1919, DMK founded the later well-known Fanø races (held until 2004).

== Today ==
Christian Seidenfaden was elected as president of the club in 2010.

It hosts a wide range of car events across Denmark, including rallies and exhibitions. Other sociable events include bowling evenings in Frederiksberg and shootings at the Royal Danish Shooting Society's shooting range at Sølyst.
