= Føroya Skótaráð =

Faroese Scout and Guiding organization

- Country: Faroe Islands
- Founded: 1926
- Membership: 1,400
- Affiliation: World Association of Girl Guides and Girl Scouts, Fællesrådet for Danmarks Drengespejdere, Pigespejdernes Fællesråd Danmark (observer status)
- Website scout.fo

In the Faroe Islands, there are four Scout and Guiding associations forming the Føroya Skótaráð (Faroese Scout Council). They work under the same basic rules, but they do have their own specialties.

The council is a member of the World Association of Girl Guides and Girl Scouts since June 2026, having had observer status within Pigespejdernes Fællesråd Danmark until then. It is a member of Fællesrådet for Danmarks Drengespejdere.

== Component associations ==
Emblem of the Føroya Skótasamband

=== Føroya Skótasamband ===
Also known as The Yellow Scouts, the organization was founded in 1926. There are five Scout groups in the country. The groups are not connected to religious organizations, and have both girls and boys as members. The uniform is a khaki shirt. There are just under 300 members.

Emblem of the Skótalið Frelsunarhersins

=== Skótalið Frelsunarhersins ===
The Salvation Army Scouts or FH-Scouts were founded in 1939. There is only one small group in the country. The group, connected to the Salvation Army, has boy and girl members. The uniform is a gray shirt. In 1994, there were 24 members throughout the country.

==== Emblem ====
The Skótalið Frelsunarhersins logo is based on the historic logos of the Salvation Army Life-Saving Scouts and Life-Saving Guards and is except for the text identical to the logo of the Norwegian Salvation Army Scouts (Frelsesarmeens speidere). It shows in red a lifebuoy with in the centre the letters FH for Frelsens Hær (The Salvation Army) and on the lifebuoy the motto "To Save and to Serve" written in Faroese language. The symbols in the loops are: bible for caring for the soul, lamp for caring for others, eye for caring for the mind and gymnastics clubs for caring for the body.

The last years, the FH scouts have not had activities, due to the lack of leaders.

Emblem of the Føroya KFUK Skótar

=== Føroya KFUK-Skótar ===
The Faroese YWCA Scouts, the local Girl Scouts, were founded in 1928. There are five groups in the country, in Tórshavn, Klaksvík, Fuglafjørður, Sandur and Kollafjørður. They are connected to the Lutheran Church. In most places, there are only female members. The uniform is a darkgreen shirt and a lightgreen scarf with a trefoil. In 2024, there were 266 members.

- Spírur (Sprouts) – ages 6-8. "Vit hjálpast at, og vit hjálpa øðrum". We help each other, and we help others.
- Tìtlingar (Brownies) - ages 8-10. "Vit vilja standa saman, vit vilja gera okkara besta". We stand together, we do pur best
- Skótar (Scouts) – ages 10 to 13 "Vit eru til reiðar", We are prepared.
- Ungdómsskótar (Youth Scouts) – ages 14 to 18
- Leiðarar (Leaders) – ages 16 and older

Homepage: kfukskotar.fo

=== KFUM Skótarnir I Føroyum ===
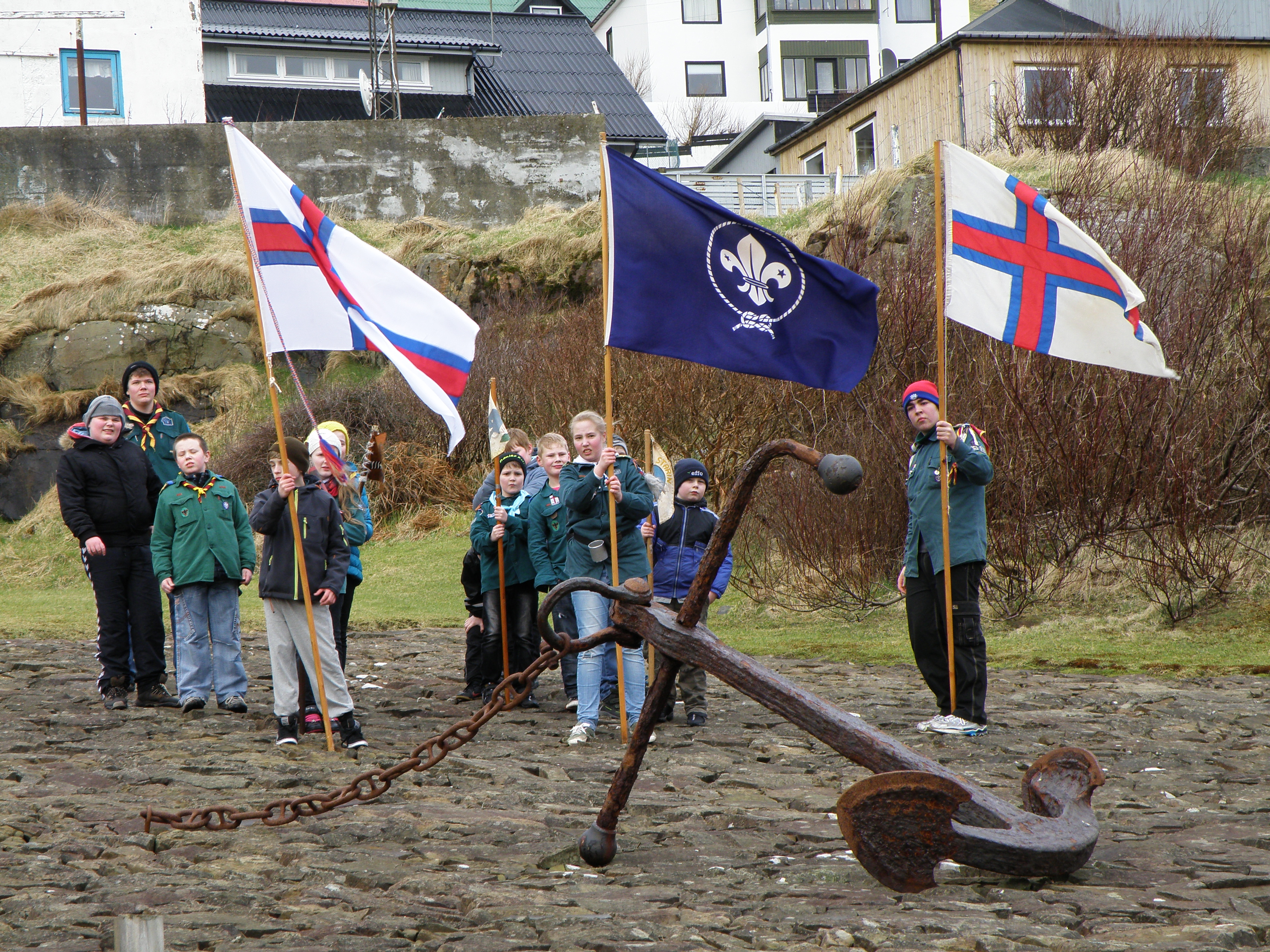
Members of KFUM Skótarnir I Føroyum flying the national flag on Grækarismessa (12 March)

The Faroese YMCA Scouts were founded in 1939. There are 7 groups in the country, and the organization is also connected to the Lutheran Church. The uniform is a green shirt and members are both male and female. In 1994, there were 14 groups and 998 members in the country.

== Scout Promise, Law and Motto ==
The four associations use different versions of the Scout Promise and the Scout Law.

The Scout Motto is Ver til reiðar, Be Prepared.
