= Greenland Guide and Scout Association =

Guiding and Scouting movement in Greenland

- Grønlands Spejderkorps
- Kalaallit Nunaanni Spejderit Kattufiat
- Country: Greenland
- Founded: February 2, 1973
- Defunct: 2018
- Membership: 500 (2007)
- Affiliation: Fællesrådet for Danmarks Drengespejdere, Pigespejdernes Fællesråd Danmark

The Greenland Guide and Scout Association (Greenlandic: Kalaallit Nunaanni Spejderit Kattuffiat, Danish: Grønlands Spejderkorps) was a Danish Scout associations, founded on February 2, 1973. Previously Greenlandic boys had belonged to one of the Danish Scout associations and girls belonged to one of the corresponding Danish Guide associations. Scouting in Greenland started in 1943, and Guiding began in 1950. Greenland Guide and Scout Association, however, was a coeducational organization, and had been recognized as an associate member of the Fællesrådet for Danmarks Drengespejdere since 1976 and of the Pigespejdernes Fællesråd Danmark since 1981. Initial grants from the Parliament of Greenland helped the fledgling organization. In 2007, the association had about 500 members.

The association focused upon local conditions, skills and handicrafts, sea and mountaineering activities and subzero camping, as well as nature conservation, of particular importance on the Arctic island. The limited means of public transport rendered a camp for all members impracticable, so camps were instead arranged at district level. The membership badge of the association incorporated elements of the coat of arms of Greenland.

The association was dissolved in 2018 due to lack of activities and members. The group in Nuuk was restarted in 2021 and joined the Det Danske Spejderkorps in 2021.

== See also ==
- Scouting and Guiding in Newfoundland and Labrador
