= Mary Steen =

Danish photographer, feminist (1853–1939)

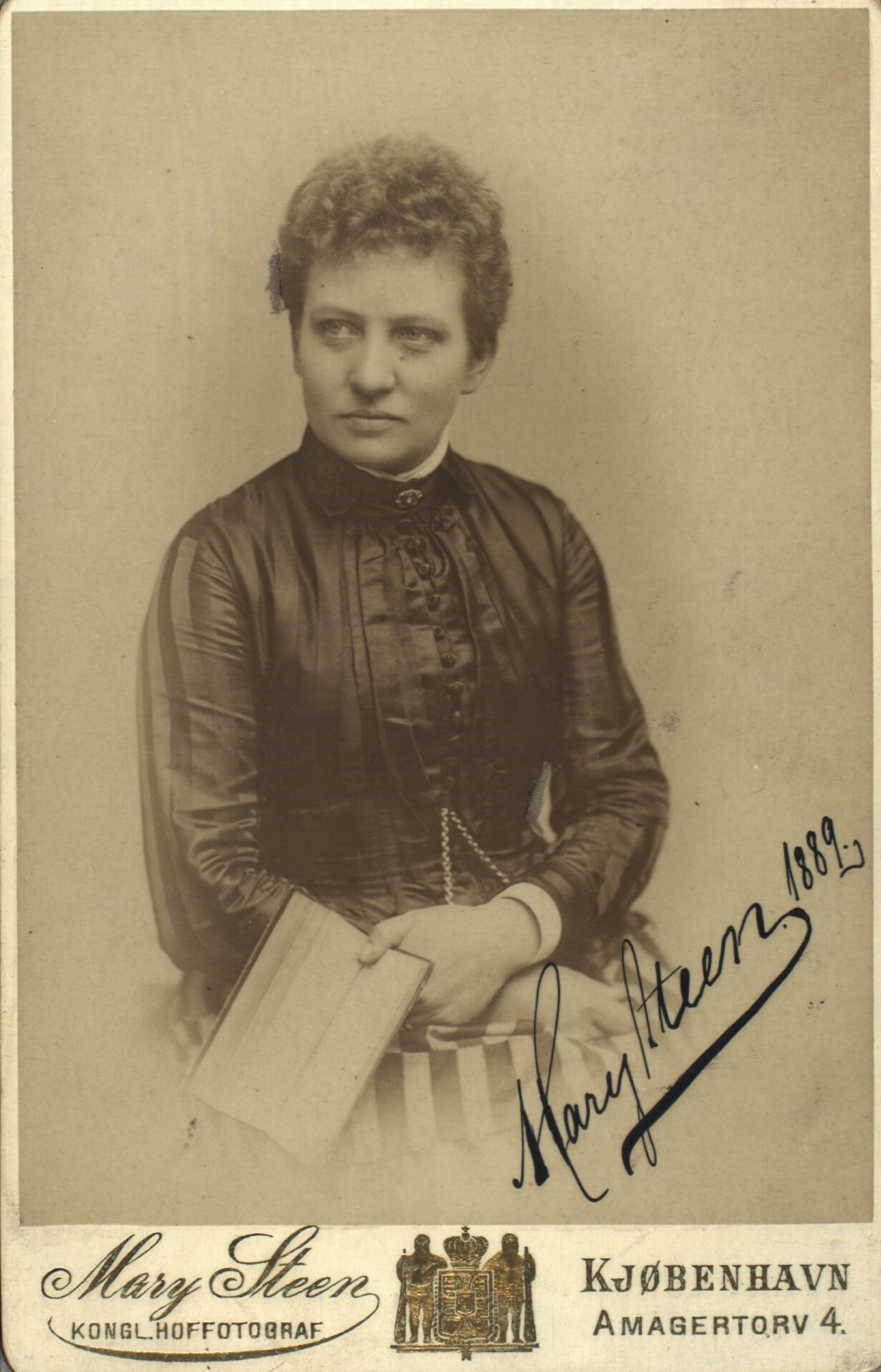
- Born: 28 October 1853; Denmark
- Died: 7 April 1939 (aged 85); Copenhagen
- Occupation: photographer

Mary Dorothea Frederica Steen (28 October 1853 – 7 April 1939) was a Danish photographer and feminist. At the age of 31, she opened a studio in Copenhagen where she specialized in indoor photography. She later became Denmark's first female court photographer, working not only with the Danish royal family but, at the invitation of Princess Alexandra, with the British royal family too. She also played an important part in improving conditions for female workers and encouraging women to take up the profession of photography.

== Early life ==
Born in a village between Aarhus and Randers in Jutland, Steen was the daughter of Niels Jensen Steen, a schoolteacher, and Caroline Kirstine Petersen. In her late teens, she moved to Copenhagen where she graduated at the Women's Business School but she soon found out that she was not made for office work. She decided to take up photography and received training first in Sweden and then with a photographer in Copenhagen.

== Professional career ==
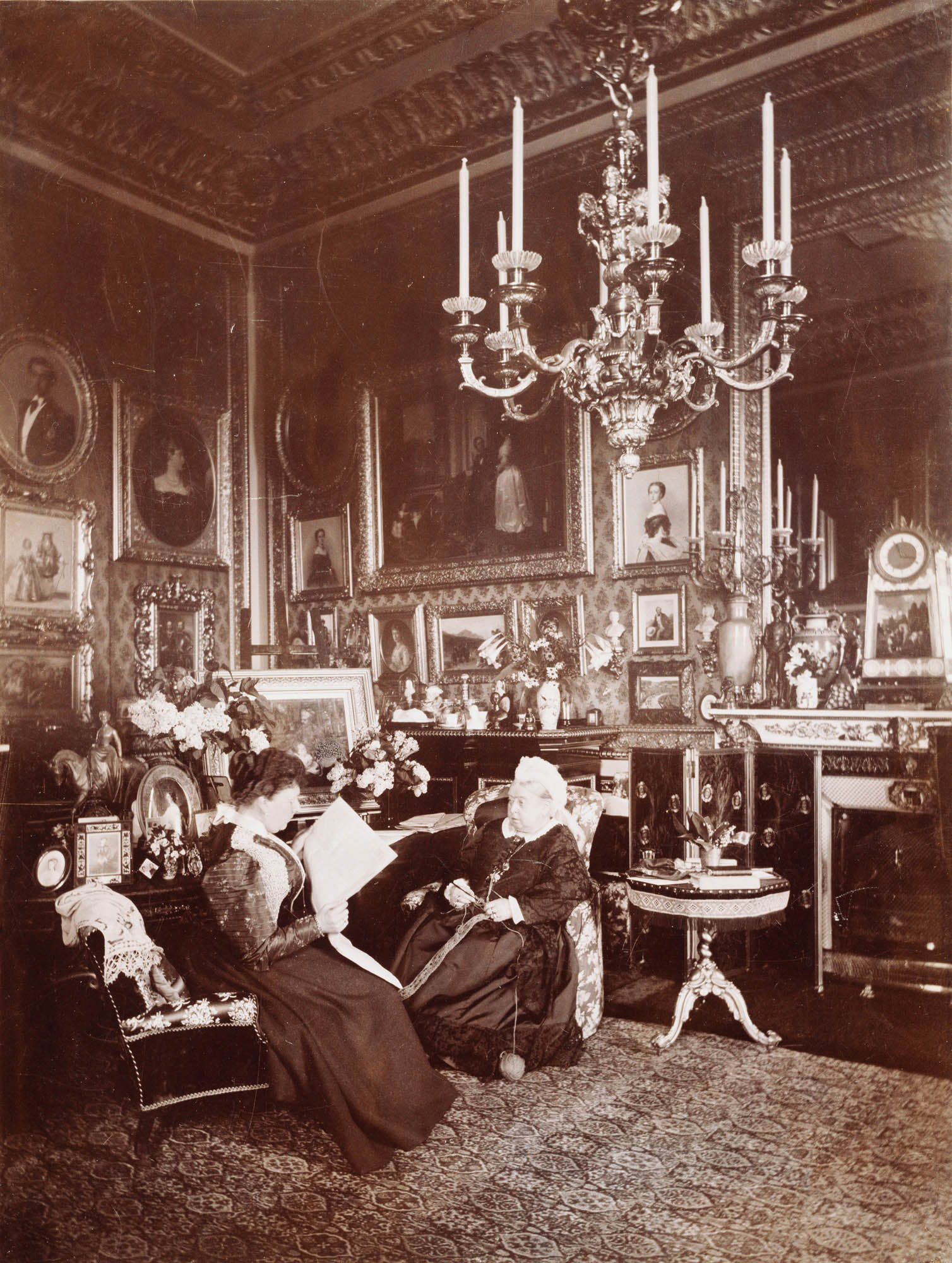
Mary Steen: Queen Victoria and Princess Beatrice, Windsor Castle (1895)

In 1884, at the age of 31, she opened her own photographic studio on Amagertorv in the centre of Copenhagen. At the 1888 Nordic Exhibition she won a silver medal for her photographs of both royalty and ordinary citizens in their homes, and she also exhibited at the 1893 World Exhibition in Chicago.

Steen's speciality was indoor photography, a difficult art at a time when electricity was not widespread. The photographs she took at the Flerons' house on Copenhagen's Vesterbrogade are among the first showing people inside their own homes.

The indoor photographs in Et minde fra Fredensborg i fjor (Last year's memories of Fredensborg) are among the first shots to be published in the magazine Illustreret Tidende.

In 1888, she became the first female court photographer for Princess Alexandra who was to marry Great Britain's Edward VII. Around 1895, Princess Alexandra invited her to London where she photographed members of the royal family, including Queen Victoria at Windsor Castle.

As a result of growing deafness, she closed her studio in 1918.

== Promoting feminism ==
In 1891, she was the first woman on the board of the Danish Photographers Association. She was also active in the Danish Women's Society (Dansk Kvindesamfund) where she sat on the board from 1889 to 1892. Together with Julie Laurberg, she photographed the leading figures in the Danish women's movement. In 1891, she received a grant from the Reiersenske Fond, a trade association, which allowed her to travel to Germany and Vienna.

She campaigned for better working conditions for women including eight days holiday and a half day off on Sundays. She treated her own staff well, paying good wages.

== Overall assessment ==
Steen considered her work to be art. Photography was becoming an attractive profession for women. Agnes Henningsen who became a trainee with Mary Steen in 1895 provides a lively description of Steen in her memoirs Byen erobret, published in 1945: "Everything about Mary Steen was powerful and energetic. She shook her head decisively, refusing to have a trainee. She would discourage anyone who wanted to open a studio in Copenhagen. (...) I concluded: 'So I won't be able to take those children, Miss Steen. The only thing I want is to be a photographer.' She stood up, gesturing meaningfully: 'Start tomorrow.'"

== See also ==
- Photography in Denmark
- History of photography

== Sources ==
- This article draws heavily on Mary Steen from Dansk Kvindebiografisk Leksikon.
- Photography News article:
- National Portrait Gallery: Mary Steen
- Europeana Collections Article: Mary Steen
- Royal Collection Trust Article: Mary Steen (1856–1939)
