= Arthur Ivan Allin =

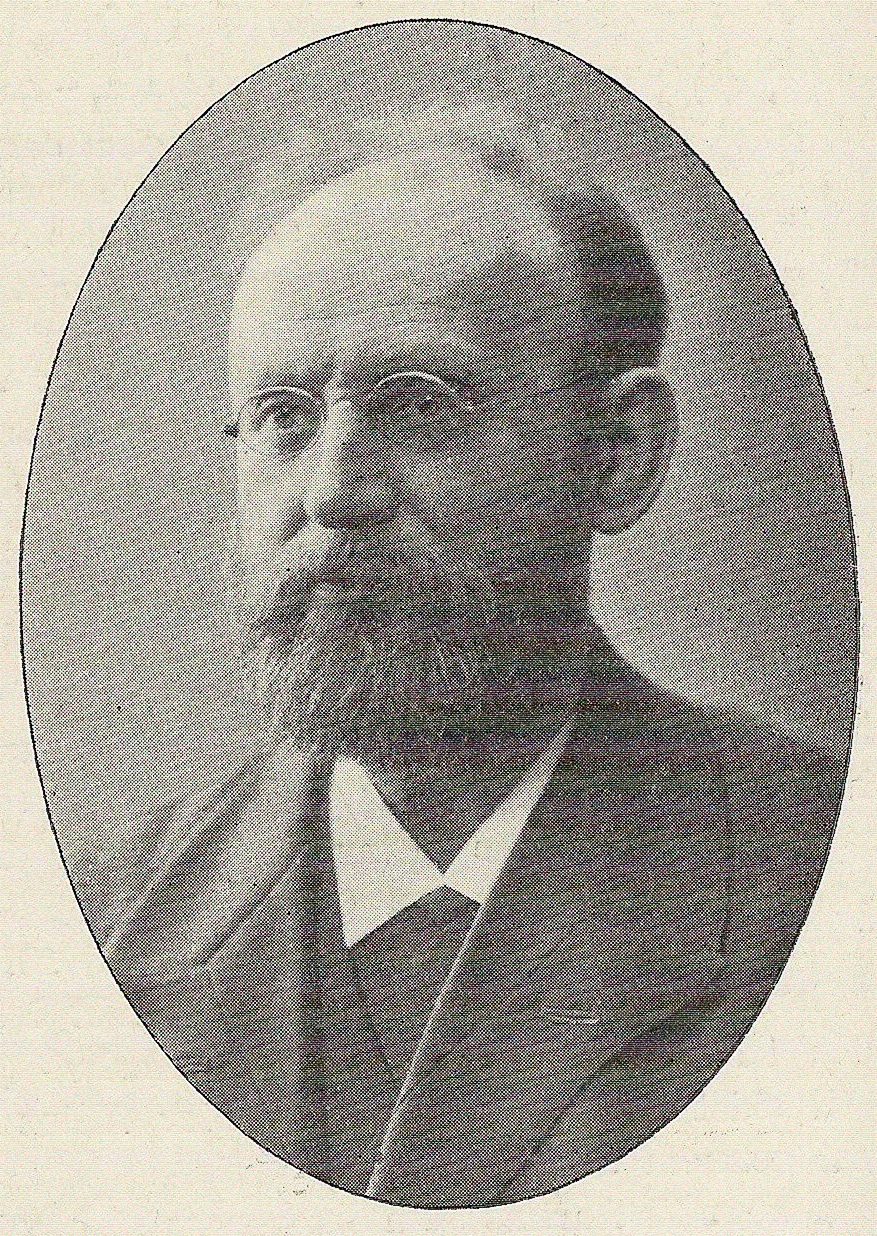
- Born: 3 December 1847; Copenhagen
- Died: 31 January 1926 (aged 78)
- Occupations: Violinist Organist Conductor and Composer.

Arthur Ivan Allin (3 December 1847 – 31 January 1926) was a Danish violinist, organist, conductor, and composer.

Arthur Allin has never specialized as a musician. As his interests have been many-sided, his field of work has been extensive, more so presumably than he dreamed when he, as a 12-year-old boy, stepped into Tivoli Gardens and beat the little drum in "Old Lumbye's" orchestra.

Arthur Ivan Allin was born in Copenhagen, Denmark on 3 December 1847. In the days of his childhood, he had music instructions from Adolf Hartmann (piano), Valdemar Tofte (violin), and Peter Rasmussen (theory).

== Career ==
In Tivoli, he played on and off until 1874. Then he wanted to move away from the capital and became an organist in Rønne (1875–1880), at St. Peter's Church in Næstved (1881–89), and at Aarhus Cathedral (1888–1915), where he succeeded Robert Allen. While in Aarhus, he also took a job as conductor of the Centralized "Jyske Sang" Associations from 1189-1914. Allin's name has been attached firmly to the latter city's musical life through these 26 years.

Arthur Allin became a symbol of unity within various musical undertakings. Thus, he was once the president of the Aarhus Music Association and made himself famous throughout Denmark as one of the most capable Danish conductors at the time; for 25 years, he was the chief conductor of the centralized Jutlandish Choral Societies and was engaged greatly as a music teacher, concert artist, choir instructor, composer, and journalist.

The public does not have a real impression of the composer Arthur Allin because, in proportion to what he has composed, only a small part has been played and still a smaller part has been published. But considering what is and has been available, there is no doubt that it includes many interesting things, and looking at the list of his compositions also tells us that the composer's litheness enables him to move in widely different fields.

Thus he has composed music for five dramatic works, among others for "Antigone" by Sophokles, and "Hannele" by Hauptmann, and for six of David's Psalms. He has composed two symphonies, two string quartets, five overtures, a pantomime suite, and various other orchestra pieces, the choral works "Absalon", "Thyra Danebod", "The Woman With the Eggs", "The Taking of Jericho", twelve cantatas for various occasions, ten organ fantasies, about fifty organ preludes, piano music, a ballad opera, choir pieces, and songs for one voice and piano, among these the oriental "Haifa-songs" and the cycle "Wanderung im Gebirge" by Lenau, superb things which, with great applause, were sung among other occasions at the composition evening in Copenhagen in February 1915.

After 40 years, during which time he was knighted "Ridder af Dannebroge", he returned in 1915 to his native town and continued his composition activity and his work as editor of the "Danish organist and precentor association's" member periodical.

He was married to Bertha Josephine Lund, and together they had twelve children.
