= Anton Marius Andersen =

American Lutheran minister

- Born: Anton Marius Andersen; 8 March 1847; Jelling, Denmark
- Died: 23 October 1941 (aged 94)
- Education: Augsburg College & Theological Seminary
- Spouse: Marie Laurine
- Children: 7
- Parent: Anders Jorgensen

Anton Marius Andersen (March 8, 1847 - October 23, 1941) was an American Lutheran minister and the founding President of Trinity Seminary at Dana College.

== Background ==
A. M. Andersen was born in Denmark, the son of Anders Jørgensen. He was one of seven children. After fulfilling his required military service, he became a pastor.

== Additional Sources ==
- Christensen, William E. Saga of the Tower: A History of Dana College and Trinity Seminary (Blair, Nebraska: Lutheran Publishing House, 1959)
- Petersen, Peter L. A Place Called Dana: The Centennial History of Trinity Seminary and Dana College (Blair, Nebraska: Dana College, 1984)
- Jensen, John M. The United Evangelical Lutheran Church: An Interpretation (Minneapolis: Augsburg Publishing House, 1964)
- Nyholm, Paul C. The Americanization of the Danish Lutheran Churches in America: A Study in Immigrant History (Minneapolis: Augsburg, 1963)
