= Dansk Spejderkorps Sydslesvig =

Danish-language German Scouting organization

- The colors of the association are taken from the Danish flag and the coat of arms of the Duchy of Schleswig
- Country: Germany
- Founded: 1919
- Membership: 680
- Website https://spejder.de/

The Dansk Spejderkorps Sydslesvig (DSS, Danish Scouts Corps in South Schleswig) is a Scout association of the Danish minority of Southern Schleswig, Germany. Founded in 1919, the coeducational association had about 680 members in 12 groups, as of 2007. It is an affiliate of The Danish Scout Council. In the 1930s, all German scouting organisations were closed and the members transferred to Hitler Jugend - except Dansk Spejderkorps Sydslesvig. They continued during the war though the male scouters were drafted to war service.
