= De grønne pigespejdere =

Danish Guiding and Scouting organisation

De grønne pigespejdere (The Green Girl Guides) is Denmark's only Guiding and Scouting organisation exclusively for girls. It was established in 1919 as the KFUK-spejderne i Danmark (YWCA-Guides in Denmark) and changed its name to De grønne pigespejdere in 2003. De grønne pigespejdere is member of the World Association of Girl Guides and Girl Scouts through Pigespejdernes Fællesråd Danmark.

The uniform is a green shirt with a chequered scarf.

== See also ==
- Scouting and Guiding in Denmark
