= Andreas Riis Carstensen =

Danish painter

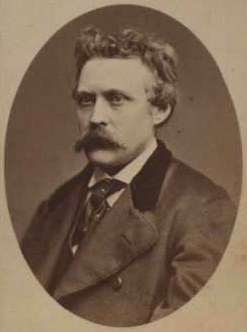
Andreas Riis Carstensen (1867)

Andreas Christian Riis Carstensen (9 November 1844 – 5 May 1906) was a Danish painter who specialized in maritime scenes, notably of Greenland.

== Biography ==
He was born in Sennels, near Thisted. His father, Jørgen (1805–1856) was the local pastor. In 1857, Andreas' widowed mother took him to Haderslev, where he grew up. After his confirmation, he became a sailor. Following several long voyages, an extended stay in Québec prompted him to try his hand at drawing.

He served for a short time as a Navy conscript in the Second Schleswig War, then settled in Copenhagen. The painter, Heinrich Hansen, an acquaintance from Haderslev, recommended him to Carl Dahl, who gave him lessons in marine painting. He also attended the Copenhagen Technical College, then enrolled at the Royal Danish Academy of Art, but left without graduating in 1868.

That same year, he exhibited three works that aroused some critical interest. He was soon short of funds, however, and went to exhibit in New York City. In 1870, at the outbreak of the Franco-Prussian War, he tried to volunteer, but there was no need for naval forces, so he returned to America. He stayed there until 1873, making a short visit to the Danish West Indies.

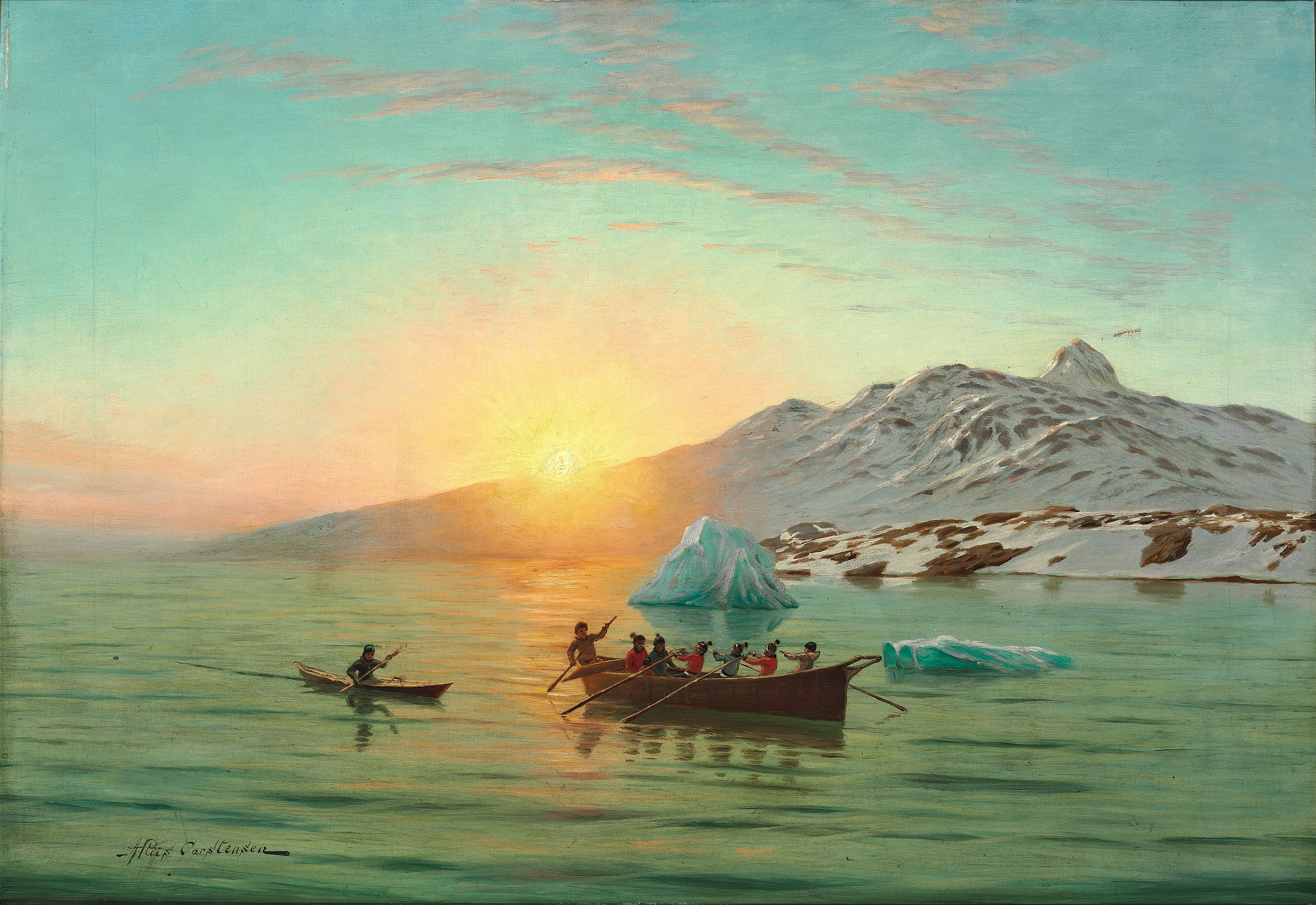
Summer Day in Greenland with an Umiak.

Beginning in 1875, he was a regular participant in the Charlottenborg Spring Exhibition. He also continued his studies in Paris at the École des Beaux-Arts under Jean-Léon Gérôme. In 1879, he won the Neuhausenske Prize for a painting of sunset on the Kattegat.

In 1884, he fulfilled a long-standing desire to visit Greenland and returned there in 1888. Two years later, he was married and began a series of trips to Egypt, creating eleven paintings commissioned by the brewer Carl Jacobsen, who was also a noted art collector.

He died in 1906 at his home in Helsingør. His widow survived him by forty-four years.
