= Emilie West =

Danish schoolteacher (1844–1907)

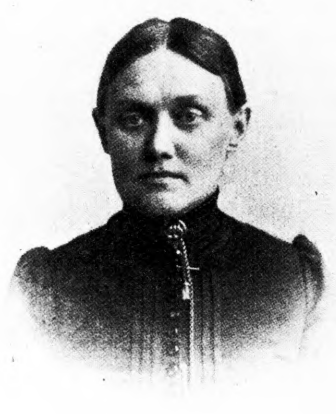
Emilie West (1844—1907)-

Clara Emilie Marie West (1844–1907) was a Danish schoolteacher who is remembered for emphasizing the need to include needlework as a subject for primary school education. Thanks to her 1899 textbook Vejledning til methodisk Undervisning i kvindeligt Haandarbejde (Guidelines for the Methodical Teaching of Needlework for Girls), needlework was introduced first in schools in Frederiksberg. It soon became an integral part of the curriculum in Copenhagen and was extended to the whole of Denmark. For the next hundred years, needlework was taught in accordance with West's proposals. It was also included in teacher-training courses for primary school teachers.

== Early life ==
Born on 20 September 1844 in Copenhagen, Clara Emilie Marie West was the daughter of the glazier Cay Frederik West (1827–78) and Susanne Marie Elisabeth née Larsen (1818–93). She qualified as a primary school teacher from Femmers Kvindeseminarium (Femmer's Seminary for Women) in 1876.

== Career ==
From 1877 until her death in 1907, West was employed by the municipal school system of the Copenhagen district of Frederiksberg. Although she taught a variety of subjects, over the years she became increasingly interested in needlework and sought ministerial support for study trips to Germany and Switzerland. This was achieved by dint of her involvement in Dansk Husflidsselskab, the Danish Handicrafts Association, which arranged holiday courses. Based on the work of the German pedagogue Rosalie Schallenfeld, she developed a new teaching method incorporating a progressive approach comparable to that used for other subjects. Her text book covered all significant areas of needlework and took account of all the latest developments.

In contrast with the trend towards the enlightening effects of visual pedagogy as proposed by Kirstine Frederiksen, West's needlework courses were frequently viewed by students as oppressive as emphasis was placed first and foremost on technique rather than on the satisfaction of obtaining results. This perhaps explains why Danish needlework teachers were often remembered as witches.

Emilie West died in Copenhagen on 10 April 1907 and was buried in the city's Assistens Cemetery.
