= Champagne Galop =

Orchestral music by Hans Christian Lumbye

- by Hans Christian Lumbye
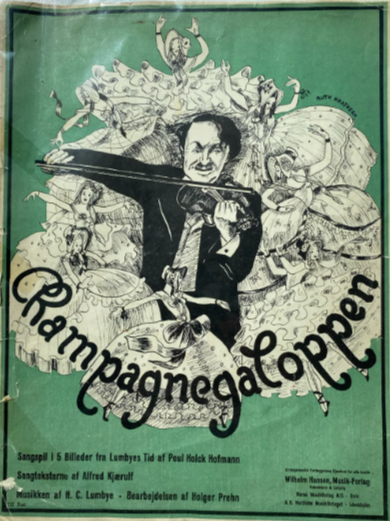
- English: Champagne Galop
- Native name: Champagnegaloppen
- Genre: Orchestral music
- Performed: 22 August 1845: Tivoli, Copenhagen

The Champagne Galop (Danish: Champagnegaloppen) is a piece of orchestral music by the Danish composer Hans Christian Lumbye (1810–1874) which was written to celebrate the second anniversary of Copenhagen's Tivoli in 1845. Together with Lumbye's Telegraph Galop and Copenhagen Steam Railway Galop, it was included in the 2006 Danish Culture Canon as a masterpiece of Danish classical music.

== Background ==
The Champagne Galop was composed for the second anniversary of Copenhagen's Tivoli Gardens on 15 August 1845. As a result of torrential rain, Lumbye — who was also Tivoli's resident conductor — was only able to present it the following week on 22 August.

Lumbye's grandson, the conductor Tippe Lumbye (1879–1959), had a story to tell about the piece's origin: "One evening, Lumbye was invited to a formal celebration at the British Embassy in Copenhagen but, passing his regular haunt on the way, he decided to spend the evening there in more familiar company. As he arrived back at the family home late in the evening, he was forced to explain how the embassy, which he had in fact never visited, had been wallowing in champagne and festivity. To illustrate it all for his curious family, he sat down at the piano and improvised a piece that would later be known as the world-famous Champagne Galop."

== Description ==
In his memoirs Mit Theaterliv, Lumbye's friend, the ballet-master August Bournonville comments on the piece. "While I by no means would ascribe the whole of Lumbye's success to the Champagne Galop, let me dwell for a moment on the impatient ferment brewing up in the first part, the cork popping off and the glasses being filled in the second part, a toast to good health, the frothy nectar downed in the third part and then a light-headed joy through the entire fourth part until a welcome "Da Capo" brings a new bottle to the table and all is swept up in a tumultuous bacchanale."

The piece is a good example of the entertaining music Lumbye liked to compose. Known as the Strauss of the North, he was a master at integrating popular dance rhythms into the compositions he wrote for those who came to his Tivoli concerts with. With its fast beat and melodious inventions, the Champagne Galop is known throughout Denmark but it is still surprising that Lumbye was so quick to include the xylophone in his symphony orchestra. It took quite a few years before the instrument became a part of orchestras elsewhere.

== Popularity ==
In recent years, the piece has gained increasing popularity on the international scene and was, for example, included in the Vienna Philharmonic's New Year's Concert in 2010 and 2015. With an average duration of 2 minutes, 23 seconds, it has been included in over 20 albums since 1993. The piece has also gained a lot of attention from the young people of Denmark, recently because of the radio show Monte Carlo, where the piece is used as a fanfare for quiz winners.

== In popular culture ==
The film Champagnegaloppen is a 1938 musical about the opening of Tivoli Gardens, with Lumbue as the protagonist.

The Danish-American cult movie Reptilicus (1961) includes a sequence set in the Tivoli Gardens. The film's music was composed by Sven Gyldmark, who scored this sequence with a medley of music prominently including H.C. Lumbye's Champagne Galop. The Tivoli Gardens' statue of H.C. Lumbye is seen in the sequence just before it concludes with Birthe Wilke performing Gyldmark's song Tivoli Night.

Frits Schlegel integrated the notes for the Champagne Galop in the facade pattern of the new Tivoli Concert Hall. Holger Blom's dress created for Ingeborg Broms for the opening of the concert hall featured the same notes as embroidery.
