= Scouting and Guiding in Denmark =

The Scout and Guide movement in Denmark consists of about ten different associations. Most of them are members of two large federations, but there are also some independent organizations. Affiliated to Danish Scouting and Guiding are the organizations in Greenland, on the Faroe Islands and in Southern Schleswig.

Scouting in Denmark started in 1909. Danish Scouts were among the charter members of the World Organization of the Scout Movement (WOSM), Danish Guides among the founding members of the World Association of Girl Guides and Girl Scouts (WAGGGS).

Girl Guiding in Denmark consists of girls only, while some WAGGGS countries allow boys to be included. De grønne pigespejdere is the only association for girls only - all the other organisations are mixed boys and girls. 'Boy Scout' and 'Girl Guide' are both translated to the Danish 'Spejder'. As of 2003 there were 22090 girls involved in Denmark in Girl Guides.

== Scout and Guide organizations ==
- Spejderne, The Danish Scout Council (47,475 members), member of WOSM. All scout associations with boys are members:
  - Danske Baptisters Spejderkorps (Danish Baptist Guide and Scout Association)
  - Det Danske Spejderkorps (The Danish Guide and Scout Association), with
    - Dansk Spejderkorps Sydslesvig (Danish Scout Association of Southern Schleswig)
  - Kalaallit Nunaanni Spejderit Kattufiat - Grønlands Spejderkorps (Greenland Scout Association)
  - Føroya Skótaráð (Faroese Scout Council), with
    - Føroya Skotasamband (Faroese Scout Association)
    - KFUM-Skotarnir i Føroyum (YMCA-Scouts of the Faroe Islands), with
      - Skótalið Frelsunarhersins (Salvation Army Scouts)
  - KFUM-Spejderne i Danmark (YMCA-Scouts of Denmark), with
    - Metodistkirkens Spejdere i Danmark (Methodist Scouts of Denmark)
- Pigespejdernes Fællesråd Danmark (Joint Committee of Girl Guides in Denmark, 22,090 members), member of WAGGGS. All scout/guide associations with girls are members:
  - Danske Baptisters Spejderkorps
  - De grønne pigespejdere (The Green Girl Guides - YWCA)
  - Det Danske Spejderkorps, with
    - Dansk Spejderkorps Sydslesvig
  - Kalaallit Nunaanni Spejderit Kattufiat - Grønlands Spejderkorps
- Føroya Skótaráð, became a full member of WAGGGs in June 2026, leaving PFD, with
    - Føroya KFUK Skótar (Faroese YWCA-Scouts)
    - Føroya Skótasamband
- Sct. Georgs Gilderne i Danmark (The National Scout and Guide Fellowship of Denmark, 7,000 members), affiliated to International Scout and Guide Fellowship
- Adventistspejderne (Adventist Scouts), affiliated to Pathfinders International
- De Gule Spejdere i Danmark - Baden-Powell spejderne, member of the World Federation of Independent Scouts

== International Scouting units in Denmark ==
- Boy Scouts of America, served by the Transatlantic Council in Copenhagen
- Girl Scouts of the USA, served by USAGSO headquarters
- Polish Scouting and Guiding, served by ZHP pgK (ZHP aboard)

== Scout-like organizations ==
- Bnei Akiva, Zionist youth organization
- DUI-Leg og Virke, socialist youth organization
- Frivilligt Drenge- og Pige-Forbund (Voluntary Boy and Girl Association)
- Royal Rangers Danmark

== See also ==
- Ungdomsøen
