= Hans Christian Lumbye =

Danish composer (1810–1874)

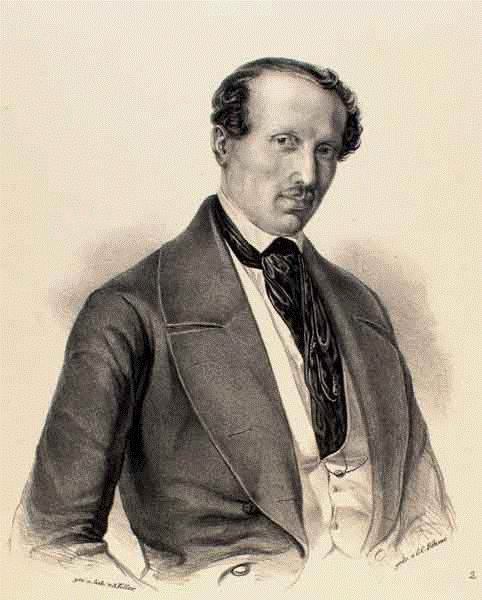
Hans Christian Lumbye

Hans Christian Lumbye (Danish pronunciation: [lɔmˈpyː]; 2 May 1810 – 20 March 1874) was a Danish composer of waltzes, polkas, mazurkas and galops, among other things.

== Life and career ==
As a child, he studied music in Randers and Odense, and by age 14 he was playing the trumpet in a military band. In 1829, he joined the Horse Guards in Copenhagen, still continuing his music education. In 1839, he heard a Viennese orchestra play music by Johann Strauss I, after which he composed in the style of Strauss, eventually earning the nickname "The Strauss of the North".

From 1843 to 1872, he served as the music director and in-house composer for Tivoli Gardens, Copenhagen. Such was his popularity in the Danish capital that many Danes revered him and considered Johann Strauss II as the "Lumbye of the South".

== Works ==
Lumbye is best known for his light compositions, many of which evoke non-musical sources. The Champagne Galop, for example, begins with the "pop" of a champagne cork, and the Copenhagen Steam Railway Galop faithfully recreates the sounds of a train chugging out of a station and grinding to a halt at the next stop. He honored the Swedish Nightingale with a "Souvenir de Jenny Lind, Vals" from 1845.

=== Galops ===
- Jubel-Galop (1840(1844)
- Juliane Galop (1843-1844)
- Telegraph Galop (1844)
- Castilianer-Galop (1847)
- Copenhagen Steam Railway Galop (1847)
- Capriccio Galop (1851)
- Juleballet (1855)
- Champagne Galop (1865)
- Cirque de Loisset Galop (1862)
- Bouquet-Royal Galop (1870)
- Kanon Galop (1853)

=== March music ===
- Marche du Nord (1856-1857)
- Kronings Marsch (1860)
- Nytårshilsen (1860)
- Kong Frederik den Syvendes Honneur-Marsch (1861)
- Kong Christian D. 9des Honneur March (1864)
- Kong Carl d. XVdes Honneur March (1869)
- Kong Georg den 1stes Honneur Marsch (1873)
- Storfyrst Alexander Marsch

=== Polkas ===
- Caroline Polka (1843)
- Casino-Polka (1846)
- Amager-Polka (1849)
- Camilla Polka (1863)
- Otto Allins Tromme-Polka (1863/1864)
- Petersborgerinden

=== Valses ===
- Krolls Ballklänge
- Amelie-Vals
- Casino Vals (1847)
- Catharina Vals (1857)
- Til den lille Prinds Christian Carl, Vals (1871)
- Dagmar Vals (1865)
- Erinnerung an Wien, Vals (1845)

== Personal life ==
He fathered two musicians, Carl Christian (9 July 1841 - 10 August 1911) and Georg August (26 August 1843 - 1922), the latter of whom took over Lumbye's orchestra after his death. His grandson Georg Høeberg was an important Danish conductor at Det kongelige Teater.
