= Ermelunden, Denmark =

Coordinates: 55°46′15″N 12°32′30″E

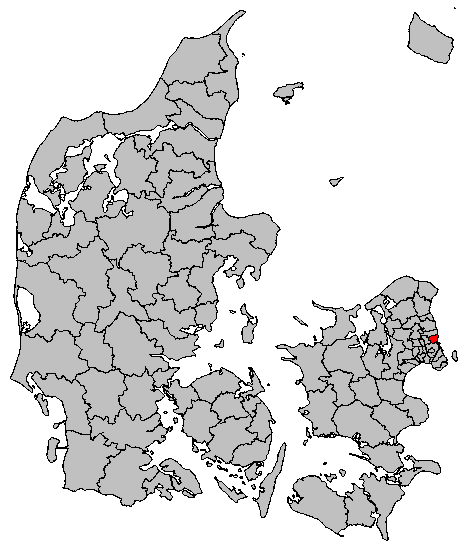

Ermelunden is a small forest in Gentofte, Denmark. It is adjacent to the larger Jægersborg Dyrehave.

In 1924 it was the site of the 2nd World Scout Jamboree, which brought together 4,549 Scouts and Guides from all over the world.

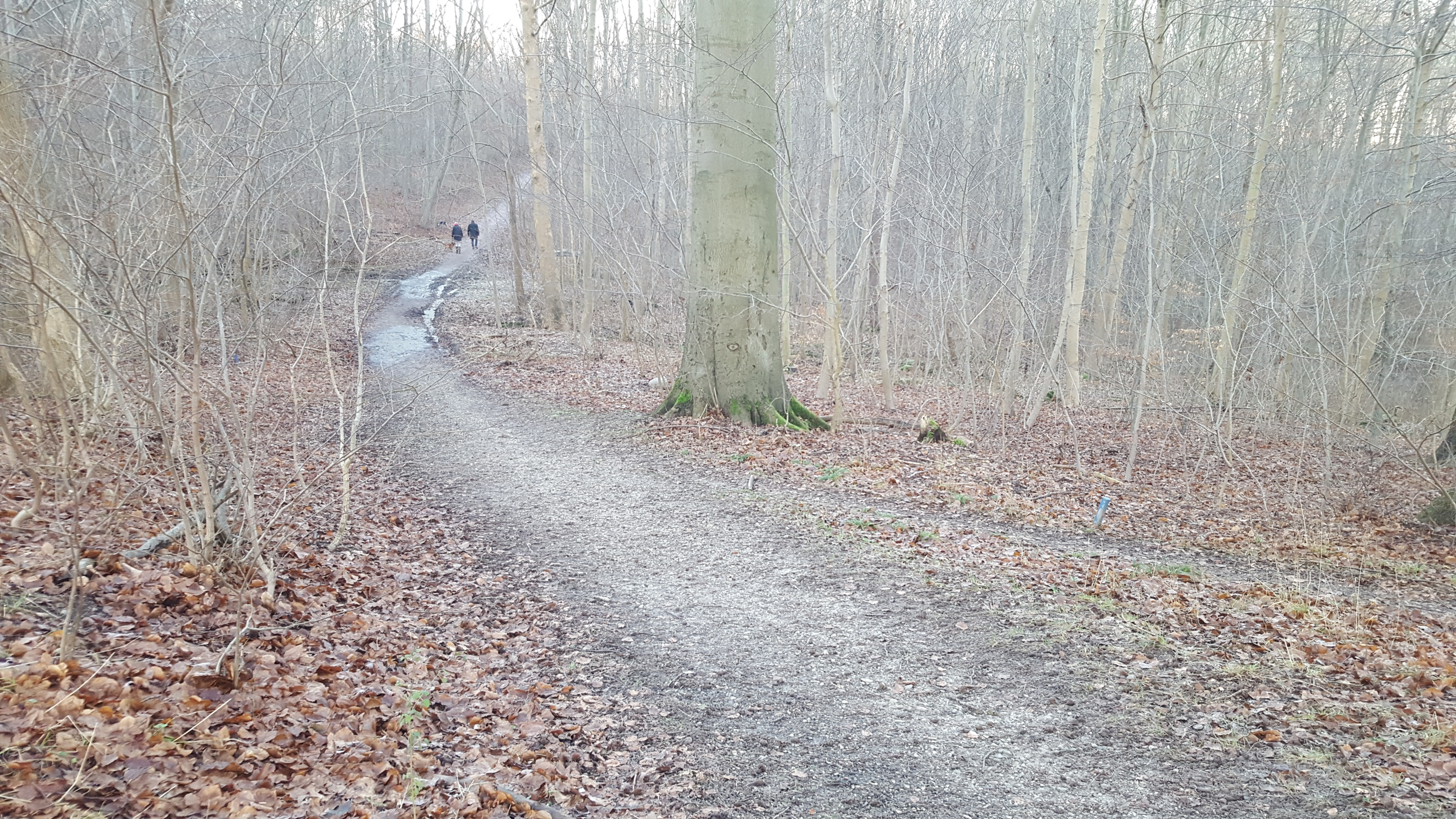
Path

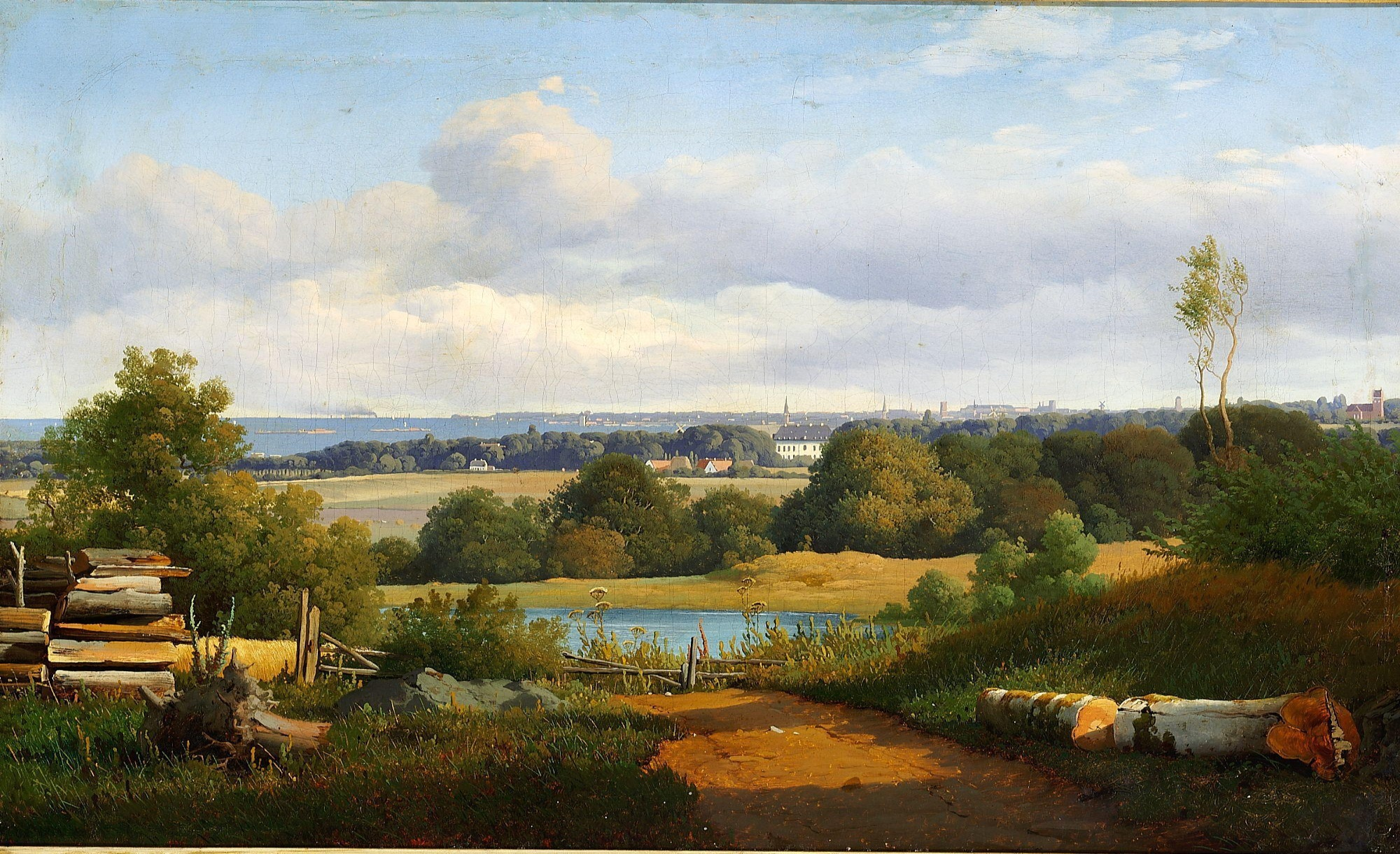
Painting, view towards Øresund
