= The Danish Scout Council =

Federation of Danish, Greenland & Faroe scout associations

Spejderne
- English: Danish Scout Council
- Headquarters: Copenhagen
- Country: Denmark
- Founded: 23 April 1962
- Membership: ca. 41 000
- Chairman: Ole Busk Poulsen
- Affiliation: World Organization of the Scout Movement
- Website spejderne.dk

The Danish Scout Council (DSC; Danish: Foreningen Spejderne, "Spejderne", formerly Fællesrådet for Danmarks Drengespejdere, FDD) is the national Scouting federation of Denmark. Scouting was founded in Denmark in 1909 and it was among the charter members of WOSM in 1920. Denmark has 70,000 Scouts.

== History ==
In 1920, Det Danske Spejderkorps (DDS) was among the founding members of the Boy Scouts' International Conference. The KFUM-Spejderne i Danmark (KFUM-S) gained an independent title of membership in 1924. In 1961, the World Scout Conference changed the statutes of WOSM requesting only one member per country. Thus, DDS and KFUM-S founded the Fællesrådet for Danmarks Drengespejdere which overtook the WOSM membership on 23 April 1962.

== Structure ==
Member organizations of the federation are:

- Det Danske Spejderkorps
- KFUM-Spejderne i Danmark
- Danske Baptisters Spejderkorps
- Dansk Spejderkorps Sydslesvig (associate member)
- Føroya Skótaráð (associate member)
  - Føroya Skotasamband
  - KFUM-Skotarnir i Føroyum
  - Skótalið Frelsunarhersins

Kalaallit Nunaanni Spejderit Kattufiat - Grønlands Spejderkorps was an associate member until its dissolution in 2018.

The associate members of the Danish Scout Council are all part of the council due to common history with Denmark. Kalaallit Nunaanni Spejderit Kattufiat - Grønlands Spejderkorps from Greenland and Føroya Skótaráð from the Faroe Islands are both associated since their countries are officially still parts of the Kingdom of Denmark, while the Dansk Spejderkorps Sydslesvig offers Scouting to the Danish minority of Southern Schleswig in Schleswig-Holstein, Germany.

DSC consists of 9 representatives, four from Det Danske Spejderkorps, four from KFUM-Spejderne and a Council Commissioner. Other associated representatives comes from Danske Baptisters Spejderkorps, Meginfelag Føroyer Dreingjaskota and Dansk Spejderkorps Sydslesvig.

Les Scouts Tunisiens (Scouts of Tunisia) have a partnership project with KFUM-Spejderne i Danmark.

== Jamboree Denmark ==
A Jamboree, "Spejdenes Lejr", took place near Holstebro in July 2012, run jointly by member organizations of the FDD as well as the Joint Committee of Girl Guides in Denmark, namely De grønne pigespejdere, KFUM-Spejderne, Det Danske Spejderkorps, Danske Baptisters Spejderkorps and the Dansk Spejderkorps Sydslesvig. Over 37,000 participants were involved.

Further council Jamborees took place in Sønderborg in 2017, and Hedeland Naturpark in both 2022 and 2026.

The council made a bid to host the 27th World Scout Jamboree in 2031, and it was chosen at the World Scout Conference in August 2024. The event will be hosted by Silkeborg Kommune, which will also host Spejdenes Lejr in 2030.

== Emblems ==
=== Danske Spejderkorps and Dansk Spejderkorps Sydslesvig ===
The Dansk Spejderkorps Sydslesvig logo is composed of a Scout fleur-de-lis and a Guide trefoil. The colours of the logo are blue and yellow with a red background, the line drawing is white. The blue and yellow colours symbolize the Schleswig colours, while the red background and white line drawing symbolizes the Danish colours, namely red and white. The Det Danske Spejderkorps logo is dark blue with the same line drawing in white. Before 2003 it had the trefoil in light blue and the fleur-de-lis in yellow on a dark blue background.

=== KFUM-Spejderne i Danmark and KFUM-Skotarnir i Føroyum ===
The KFUM-Spejderne i Danmark logo is composed of Scouting elements, a fleur-de-lis and YMCA elements, a triangle shape. The triangle symbolizes the Holy Trinity, which is part of the YMCA's Christian work. The triangle also symbolizes the development of a healthy "body, mind and spirit" Before 2002 the organisation had a more standard YMCA-Scouting logo, a green conventional fleur-de-lis on a red triangle, much like the KFUM-Skotarnir i Føroyum still has. However, the KFUM-Skotarnir i Føroyum logo has a black fleur-de-lis in a particular design.

=== Danske Baptisters Spejderkorps ===
The Danske Baptisters Spejderkorps is composed of a Scout fleur-de-lis, a Guide trefoil and a cross symbolizing the Christian background.

=== Skótalið Frelsunarhersins ===
The Skótalið Frelsunarhersins logo is based on the historic logos of the Salvation Army Life-Saving Scouts and Life-Saving Guards and is except for the text identical to the logo of the Norwegian Salvation Army Scouts (Frelsesarmeens speidere). It is shows in red a lifebuoy with in the centre the letters FH for Frelsens Hær (The Salvation Army) and on the lifebuoy the motto "To Save and to Serve" written in Faroese language. The symbol in the loops are: bible for caring for the soul, lamp for caring for others, eye for caring for the mind and gymnastics clubs for caring for the body.

=== Kalaallit Nunaanni Spejderit Kattufiat - Grønlands Spejderkorps ===
The Grønlands Spejderkorps logo is composed of a Guide trefoil, a Scout fleur-de-lis in light blue and white and a variant of the Coat of arms of Greenland in red in white.

== See also ==
- Scouting and Guiding in Denmark
