= 1896 in Denmark =

- Decades: 1870s; 1880s; 1890s; 1900s; 1910s
- See also: Other events of 1896; List of years in Denmark

Events from the year 1896 in Denmark.

== Incumbents ==
- Monarch – Christian IX
- Prime minister – Tage Reedtz-Thott

== Events ==
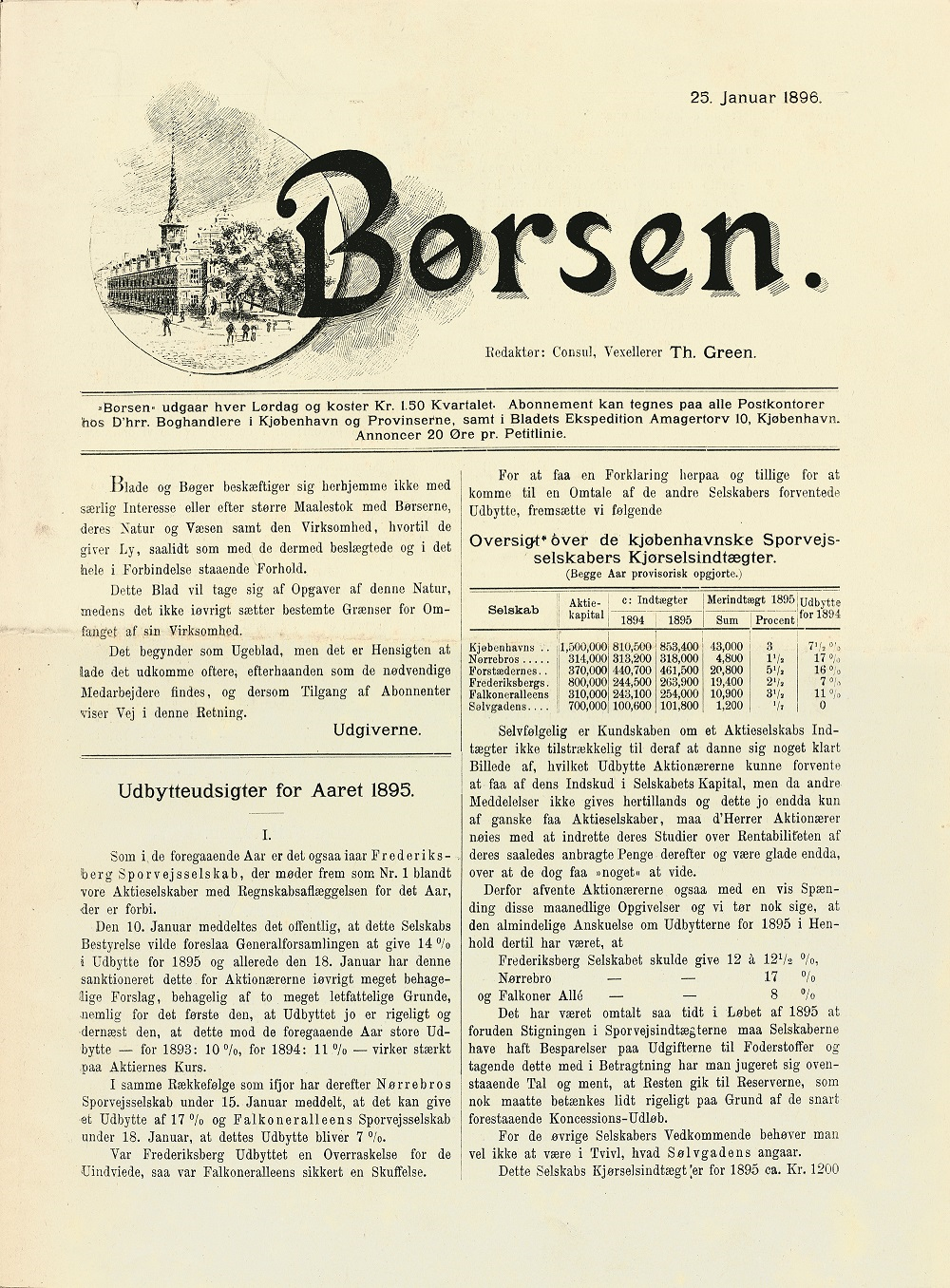
The front page of the first issue of Børsen from 25 January 18961905

- 25 January – Børsen, then as a four pages weekly newspaper, is published for the first time.
- 18 April – Frants Hvass, diplomat (died 1982)
- 1 October – The newspaper Kristeligt Dagblad is published for the first time.
- 14 December – A treaty between Denmark and Portugal is signed, establishing diplomatic relations.

=== Undated ===
- The first registered herd of Danish Landrace pigs is established.

== Sports ==
- April – Viborg FF is founded.
- 6–15 April – Denmark wins 1 gold medal, two silver medals and three bronze medals at the 1896 Summer Olympics.
  - 7 April – Viggo Jensen wins a gold medal in Men's two hand lift and a bronze medal in Men's one hand lift wrestling.
  - 0 April – Holger Nielsen wins a bronze medal in Men's sabre fencing.
  - 11 April Holger Nielsen wins a silver medal in Men's 30 metre free pistol and a bronze medal in Men's 25 metre rapid fire pistol.
  - 12 April – Viggo Jensen wins a bronze medal in Men's 300 metre free rifle, three positions.

=== Cycling ===
- 14–15 August – The 1896 ICA Track Cycling World Championships are held in Copenhagen.
  - Denmark wins a silver medal and a bronze medal at the amateur event.

== Births ==
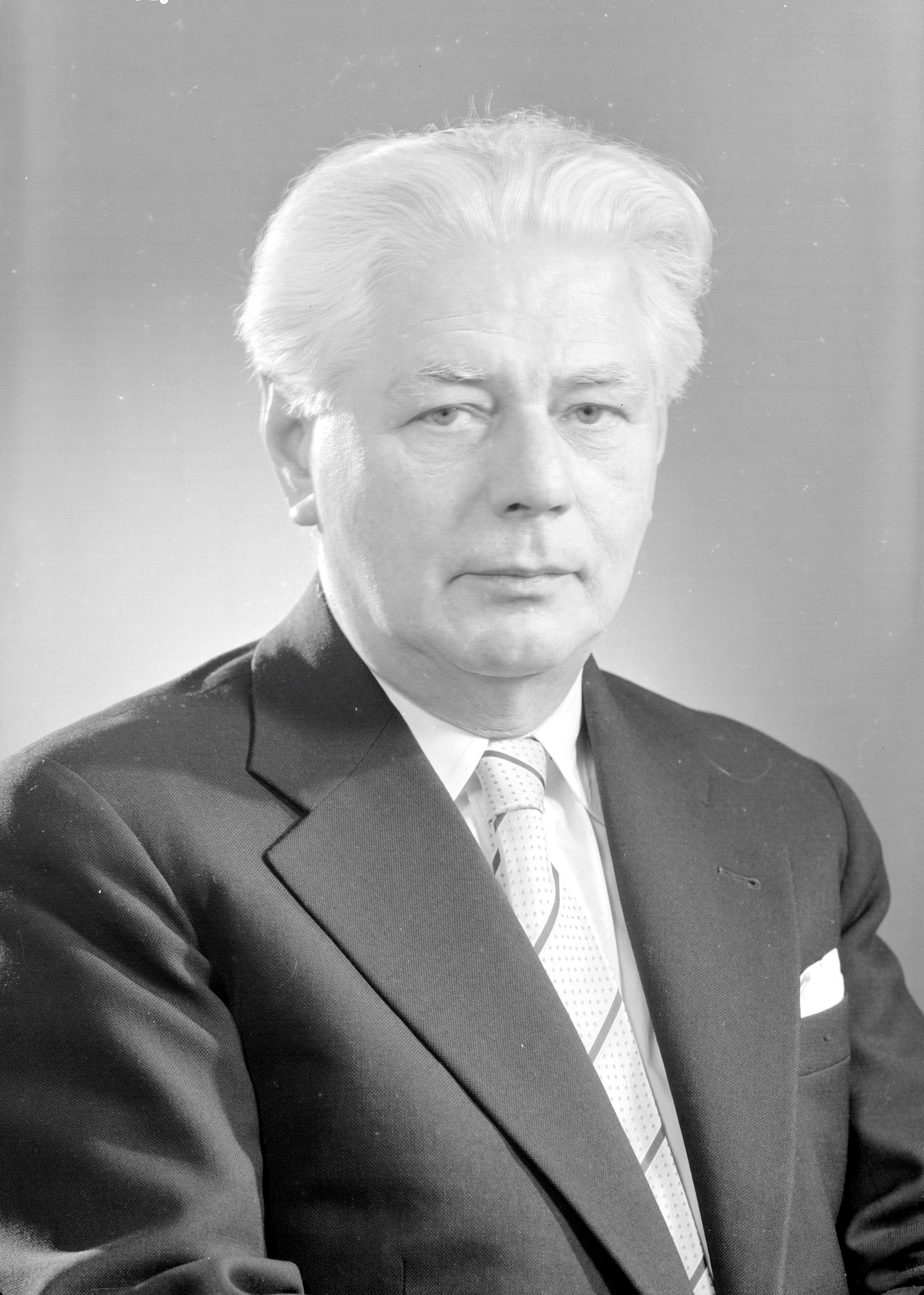
Julius Bomholt.

=== January–March ===
- 5 January – Eyvind Johan-Svendsen, stage and film actor (died 1946)
- 24 January – Johannes Theodor Suhr, Roman Catholic bishop (died 1997)
- 7 February – Christian Thomas, gymnast (died 1970)
- 4 March – Kai Holm, actor (died 1985)

=== April–June ===
- 8 April – Einar Juhl, film actor (died 1982)
- 4 May – Frits Schlegel, architect (died 1965)
- 9 May – Ingeborg Frederiksen, illustrator (died 1976)
- 11 June – Julius Bomholt, politician (died 1969)

=== July–September ===
- 20 July – Ellen Louise Mertz, Denmark's first female geologist (died 1987)
- 12 August – Ejner Federspiel, actor (died 1981)
- 31 August – Henning Haslund-Christensen, travel writer and anthropologist (died 1948)
- 20 September – Fleming Lynge, screenwriter (died 1970)

=== October–December ===
- 30 October – Carl Erik Soya, author and dramatist (died 1983)

== Deaths ==
=== January–March ===
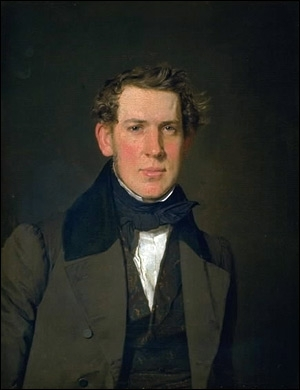
Carl Adolph Feilberg.

- 8 January – Carl Adolph Feilberg, businessman (born 1810)
- 14 March– Therese Brummer, writer (born 1833)

=== April–June ===
- 4 April – Juliette Price, ballet dancer (died 1831)
- 20 April – Hans Peter Ingerslev, politician (died 1831)
- 8 June – Johan Frederik Schlegel, lawyer and civil servant (born 1817)

=== July–September ===
- 19 August – Julius Lange, art historian (born 1838)

=== October–December ===
- 12 October – Christian Emil Krag-Juel-Vind-Frijs, politician and landowner (born 1817)
