= 1985 in Denmark =

- Decades: 1960s; 1970s; 1980s; 1990s; 2000s
- See also: Other events of 1985; List of years in Denmark

Events from the year 1985 in Denmark.

== Incumbents ==
- Monarch - Margrethe II
- Prime minister - Poul Schlüter

== Events ==
- 4 June – The Farø Bridges are inaugurated.
- 22 July – Copenhagen bombings by Hezbollah; three bombs were set off in Copenhagen. Two exploded near the Great Synagogue and the third destroyed the offices of the American Northwest Orient Airlines. One person was killed and 26 injured in the attacks. The Lebanon-based Islamic Jihad Organization claimed responsibility for the attacks, and three Palestinians were later tried (Abu Talb, Marten Imandi and another, of whom the latter two were convicted of the Copenhagen attacks) in a Swedish court for the terrorist attacks.

== Sports ==
=== Badminton ===
- 10–16 June Denmark wins one silver medal and two bronze medals at the 1985 IBF World Championships.
- Gentofte BK wins Europe Cup.

=== Cycling ===
- 8 July – Jørgen V. Pedersen wins Stage 10 of the 1985 Tour de France-
- Gert Frank (DEN) and Hans-Henrik Ørsted (DEN) win the Six Days of Copenhagen six-day track cycling race.
- Unknown date – Hans-Henrik Ørsted wins gold in Men's individual pursuit at the 1985 UCI Track Cycling World Championships.

=== Swimming ===
- 4–11 August –Benny Nielsen wins a silver medal in Men's 200 metre butterfly at the 1985 European Aquatics Championships.

== Births ==
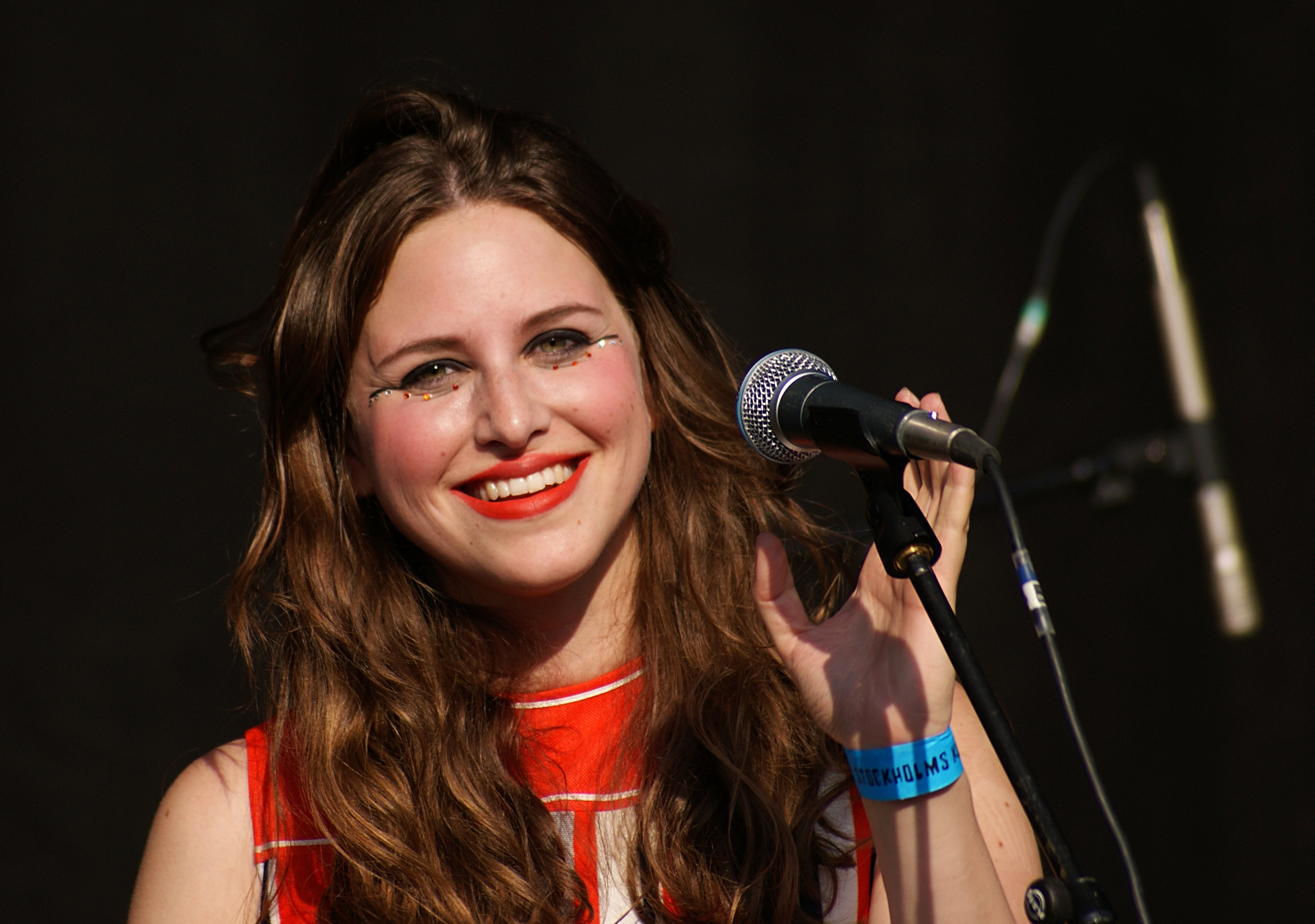
Fallulah.

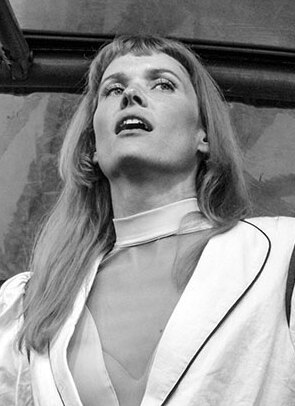
Oh Land.

=== January–March ===
- 2 January – Henrik Møllgaard, handball player
- 6 January – Amalie Bruun, musician and actress
- 21 January – Aura Dione, singer and songwriter
- 3 February – Stine Fischer Christensen, actress
- 6 February – Fallulah, Danish-Romanian singer-songwriter
- 21 February Susie Jessen, politician
- 24 February – William Kvist, footballer
- 22 March – Jakob Fuglsang, road racing cyclist
- 31 March – Hesper Hansen, footballer

=== April–June ===
- 19 April – Niki Zimling, footballer
- 23 April – Fie Udby Erichsen, rower
- 30 April – Michael Mørkøv, racing cyclist
- 2 May – Oh Land, musician
- 7 May – Jakob Andkjær, butterfly swimmer

=== July–September ===
- 23 June – Morten Jørgensen, rower
- 1 August – Kris Stadsgaard, footballer
- 5 August – Nicolaj Rasted, musician, illustrator, and producer

== Deaths ==
- 3 January – Bodil Joensen, pornographic actress (born 1944)
- 4 February – Egon Jensen, politician (born 1922)
- 25 March – Karl Gustav Ahlefeldt, actor (born 1910)
- 28 March – Henry Hansen, cyclist (born 1902)
- 29 May – Gunnar Nielsen, athlete (born 1928)
- 10 July – Kai Holm, actor (born 1896)
- 20 July – Peter Glob, archaeologist (born 1911)
- 31 October – Poul Reichhardt, actor (born 1913)

== See also ==
- 1985 in Danish television
