= 1897 in Denmark =

- Decades: 1870s; 1880s; 1890s; 1900s; 1910s
- See also: Other events of 1897; List of years in Denmark

Events from the year 1897 in Denmark.

== Incumbents ==
- Monarch – Christian IX
- Prime minister – Tage Reedtz-Thott (until 23 May), Hugo Egmont Hørring

== Events ==
=== March ===
- 20 March – The East Asiatic Company is founded by H. N. Andersen in Copenhagen.

=== May ===
- 1 May – The Ny Carlsberg Glyptotek ioens in Copenhagen.
- 23 May – Tage Reedtz-Thott resigns as Prime minister of Denmark. The Hørring cabinet replaces the Reedtz-Thott cabinet.
- 29 May – St. Luke's Church in Frederiksberg is consecrated as the first new church to be built to relieve the pressure on Frederiksberg Church in the fast-growing Frederiksberg district of Copenhagen.
- 31 May – The Hillerød–Frederiksbværk Railway opens north of Copenhagen. It is later extended to Gundested.

=== July ===
- 11 July – The 1897 Gentofte train crash takes place.

=== August ===
- 2 August – The Voast Line netween Copenhagen (Østerport) and Helsingør is inaugurated.
- 7 August – Cabinet of Hørring is formed by Hugo Egmont Hørring of the conservative party Højre after Tage Reedtz-Thott's resignation as Council President,

=== November ===
- 12 November – The People's House opens on Jagtvej in Copenhagen.

=== Undated ===
- The Danish Workers' Union is founded.
- The machine company Titan A/S us founded by merger of two existing companies.

== Culture ==
=== Visual arts ===
- December – Peder Severin Krøyer's monumental oil-on-canvas group portrait painting A Meeting in the Royal Danish Academy of Sciences and Letters is handed over the Carlsberg Foundation.

=== Film ===
- Peter Elfelt's Driving with Greenland Dogs becomes the first film sequence shot in Denmark.

=== Music ===
- 27 April – Carl Nielsen's first choral work, Hymnus amoris, completed the previous year, receives its première at the Music Society (Musikforeningen) in Copenhagen, with the composer conducting. Viggo Bielefeldt, Tia Krëtma and Katie Adler are the soloists.

== Sports ==
- 12 June – Aarhus Fremad is founded.
- 30 July – 2 August – Edwin Schraeder wins a gold medal in men's sprint at the amateur event of the 1897 ICA Track Cycling World Championships.

Undated

- The Danish National Road Race Championships takes place for the first time.
- Kjøbenhavns Boldklub wins the 1896–97 Football Tournament.

== Births ==
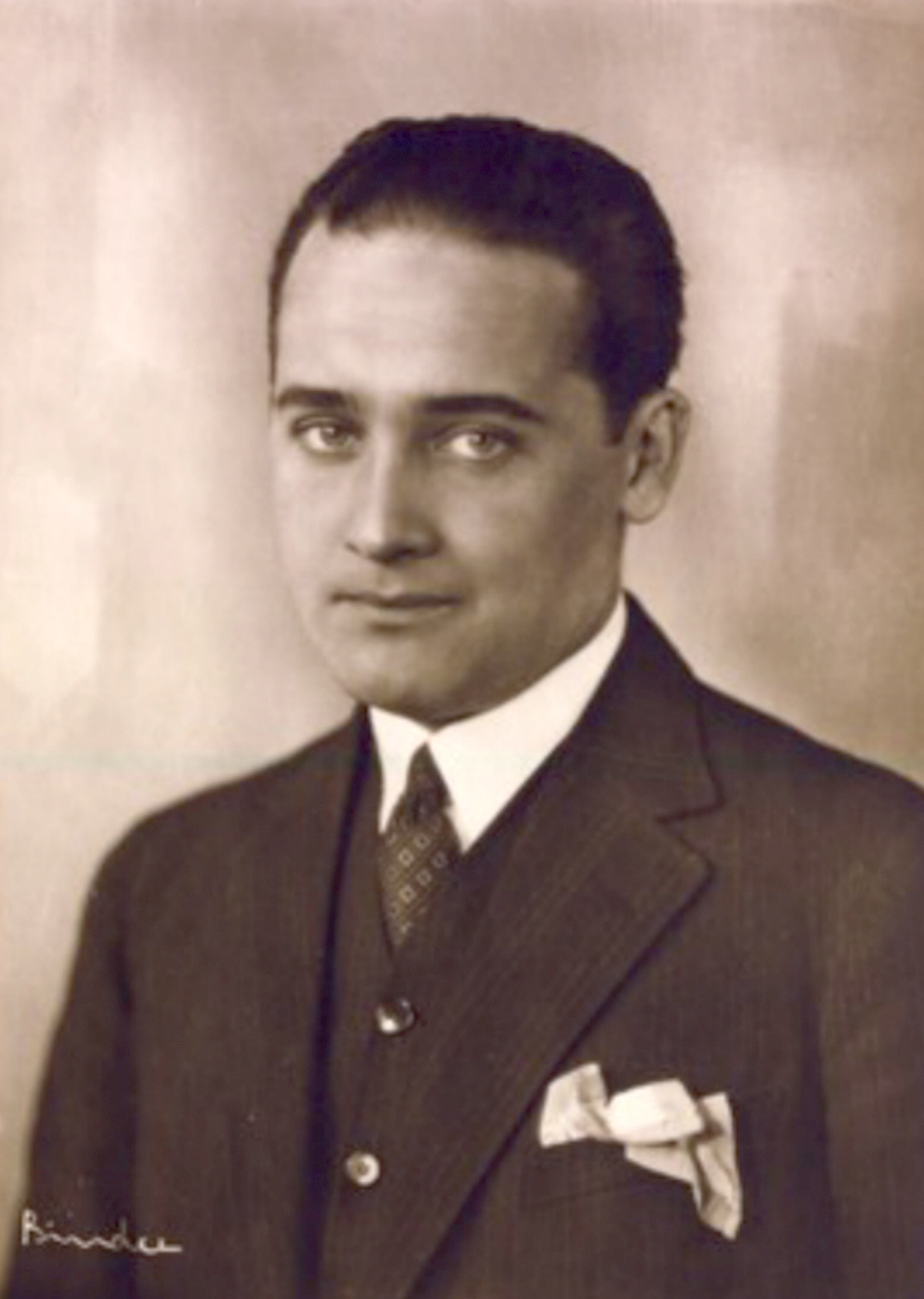
Max Hansen.

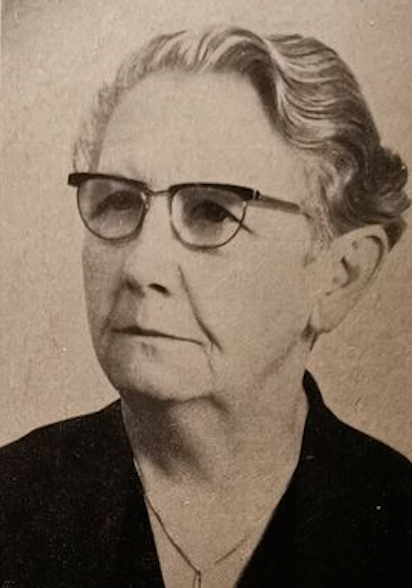
Sofie Madsen.

=== January–March ===
- 25 February – Erling Foss, engineer, businessman (died 1982)
- 6 March – Knudåge Riisager, composer (died 1974)

=== April–June ===
- 19 May – Wiwen Nilsson, silversmith (died 1974 in Sweden)
- 27 May – Henrik Sørensen, writer (died 1976)
- 9 June – Ejnar Jacobsen, composer (died 1970)

=== July–September ===
- 6 July – Victor Isbrand, painter (died 1989)
- 5 August – Aksel Larsen, politician (died 1972)
- 29 August – Helge Rosvaenge, singer (died 1972)

=== October–December ===
- 29 October – Sigurd Langberg, actor (died 1954)
- 9 November – Arthur Jensen, actor (died 1981)
- 12 December – Svend Olufsen, engineer (died 1949)
- 22 December – Max Hansen, singer, actor and comedian (died 1962)
- 30 December – Sofie Madsen, educator /died 1982)
- 31 December – Liva Weel, actress (died 1952)

== Deaths ==
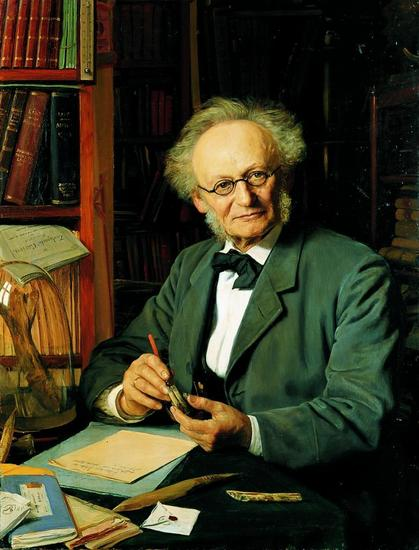
Johannes Steenstrup.

=== January–March ===
- 30 March – Christoph Cloëtta, chocolate manufacturer (born 1836)

=== April–June ===
- 7 April – Ludvig Gade, dancer and mime (born 1823)
- 30 April – Carsten Henrichsen, painter (born 1824)
- 12 May – Herman H. J. Lynge, antiquarian bookseller (born 1822)
- 20 June – Johannes Steenstrup, natural scientist (born 1813)

=== July–September ===
- 30 September – Peter Nielsen, botanist (born 1829)

=== October–December ===
- 5 October – Adolf Ditlev Jørgensen, archivist (born 1940)
- 6 November – Emma Thomsen, painter (born 1820)
