= 1982 in Denmark =

- Decades: 1960s; 1970s; 1980s; 1990s; 2000s
- See also: Other events of 1982; List of years in Denmark

Events from the year 1982 in Denmark.

== Incumbents ==
- Monarch - Margrethe II
- Prime minister - Anker Jørgensen (until September 10, Poul Schlüter

== Events ==
- January 5 – 17 years old Curt Hansen wins the European Junior Chess Championship
- January 8 – A Danish cold record is set when a temperature of -31.2 is registered in Hørsted, a village in the Thy region of northern Jytland.
- September 10 – Poul Schlüter becomes prime minister

== Sports ==
=== Badminton ===
- 28 March – Morten Frost wins gold in men's singles at the 1982 All England Open Badminton Championships.
- 13–18 April — With 2 gold medals and five bronze medals, Denmark finishes as the second best nation at the 8th European Badminton Championships in Böblingen, West Germany.
- Gentofte BK wins Europe Cup.

=== Cycling ===
- René Pijnen (NED) and Patrick Sercu (BEL) win the Six Days of Copenhagen six-day track cycling race.

== Births ==
=== January–March ===
- 2 January – Rasmus Paludan, Danish-Swedish politician and lawyer
- 16 January – Birgitte Hjort Sørensen, actress
- 26 February – Johnny Thomsen, footballer
- 2 March – Pilou Asbæk, actor

=== April–June ===
- 3 April – Stine Brix, author and politician
- 15 April – Henriette Engel Hansen, sprint canoeist
- 17 April – Martin Kampmann, mixed martial arts fighter
- 26 April – Steffen Ernemann, footballer
- 14 May – Anders Eggert, handball player
- 20 May – Allan Arenfeldt Olesen, footballer
- 25 May – Jesper Bech, footballer
- 26 May – Morten Breum, DJ and music producer
- 16 June – May Andersen, model

=== July–September ===
- 19 July – Esben Holmboe Bang, chef and restaurateur
- 24 July – Catharina Svensson, lawyer
- 19 August – Jens Berthel Askou, footballer
- 22 August – Peter Nymann, footballer

=== October–December ===
- 1 October – Louise Svalastog Spellerberg, handball player
- 20 October – Kristian Bach Bak, footballer
- 3 November – Lasse Kryger, footballer
- 30 November – Medina, musician
- 8 December – Christian Drejer, basketball player

== Deaths ==
=== January–March ===
- 12 January – Emil Hass Christensen, actor (b. 1903)
- 16 January – Harald Agersnap, composer, educator and musician (b. 1899)
- 9 February – Sofie Madsen, educator /born 1897)
- 4 March – Søren Kristian Toubro, engineer and Larsen & Toubro co-founder (born 1906)

=== April–June ===
- 24 April – Sigrid Horne-Rasmussen, actress (b. 1915)
- 1 June – Einar Juhl, film actor (born 1896)
- 4 June – Henning Dahl Mikkelsen, cartoonist (b. 1915)
- 15 June – Erling Foss, engineer and businessman (b. 1897)
- 29 June – Gunnar Aagaard Andersen, artist and designer (born 1919)

=== July–September ===
- 9 July – Helge Kjærulff-Schmidt, actor (born 1906)
- 20 September – Søren Georg Jensen, designer and sculptor (born 1917)

=== October–December ===
- 21 December – Frants Hvass, diplomat (born 1896)

== See also ==
- 1982 in Danish television
