= 1894 in Denmark =

- Decades: 1870s; 1880s; 1890s; 1900s; 1910s
- See also: Other events of 1894; List of years in Denmark

Events from the year 1894 in Denmark.

== Incumbents ==
- Monarch – Christian IX
- Prime minister – J. B. S. Estrup (until 7 August), Tage Reedtz-Thott

== Events ==
- 1 January – Gudhjem Time (Dansk normaltid) is introduced in Denmark.
- 19 May – Danish Authors' Society is founded in Copenhagen.
- 28 July
  - The foundation stone is laid for the new Copenhagen City Hall. It is not completed until 1905.
  - The Stork Fountain at Amagertorv in Copenhagen is inaugurated.
- 19 August – Frederick's Church to its final design by Ferdinald Meldahl, almost 25+ years after its construction was first started by Nicolai Eigtved.
- 9 November – The Freeport of Copenhagen opens to traffic. The same does a railway between the port and Nørrebro.

=== Undated ===
- The first electric elevator for human transportation in Denmark is installed in Magasin du Nord. A hydraulic elevator has been in operation at Hotel Kongen af Danmark since the 1870s.

== Culture ==
=== Music ===
- 14 March – The première of Carl Nielsen's Symphony No. 1 is performed by Johan Svendsen conducting the Royal Danish Orchestra, with Nielsen himself among the second violins.
- 26 March – Svend Ranulf, philosopher (died 1053)

== Sports ==
- 1 September Østerbros Boldklub is founded.

== Births ==
=== January–March ===
- 13 April – Lis Ahlmann, textile artist (died 1979)

=== April–June ===
- 3 April – John Christmas Møller, politician (died 1948)
- 1 May – Carl Petersen, politician (died 1984)
- 2 May – Ellen Gottschalch, actress (died 1981)

=== July–September ===
- 10 July – Knud Heglund, actor (died 1960)
- 14 July – Osvald Helmuth, actor and singer (died 1966)
- 9 September – Poul Henningsen, writer, architect and designer (died 1967)

=== October–December ===
- 7 November – Gertie Wandel, textile artist (died 1988)

== Deaths ==
- 17 April – Julie Sødring, actress (died 1823)
- 7 July – Adolph Hannover, physician (born 1814)
- 28 October – Carl Ploug, writer (born 1713)
