= 1898 in Denmark =

- Decades: 1870s; 1880s; 1890s; 1900s; 1910s
- See also: Other events of 1898; List of years in Denmark

Events from the year 1898 in Denmark.

== Incumbents ==
- Monarch – Christian IX
- Prime minister – Hugo Egmont Hørring

== Events ==
=== April ===
- 5 April – The 1898 Danish Folketing election is held.

=== May ===
- 1 May – The Slagelse-Verslev Railway opens on western Zealand.

=== August ===
- 1 August – The United Copenhagen Tramways is founded in Copenhagen.

=== September ===
- 21 September – The 1898 Danish Landsting election is held.

=== Undated ===
- Kirkeligt Samfund af 1898 is founded by right-leaning Grundtvigians in opposition to Indre Mission as well as left-leaning Grundtvigians.
- The Western Power Station is inaugurated in Copenhagen.
- The Danish Confederation of Trade Unions is established with Jens Jensen as its first president.
- Kjøbenhavns Grundejeres Renholdningsselskab is founded.

== Sports ==
- Unknown date – Kjøbenhavns Boldklub wins the 1897–98 Football Tournament.
- Randers Sportsklub Freja us founded in Tanders.
- Esbjerg Boldklub af 1898 is founded.

== Publications ==
- Henrik Pontoppidan's Lykke–Per vol. I (Lucky Per, 2010)

== Births ==
=== January–March ===
- 11 January – Hans Kirk, author (d. 1962)
- 13 January – Kaj Munk, playwright and Lutheran priest (d. 1944)
- 9 February – Steen Eiler Rasmussen, architect and writer (d. 1990)
- 2 March – Mogens Koch, architect and designer (d. 1992)

=== April–June ===
- 15 April – Flemming Weis, composer (died 1981)
- 17 May – Carl Hansen, footballer (d. 1978)

=== July–September ===
- 21 September – The 1898 Danish Landsting election is held.

=== October–December ===
- 29 October – Gudrun Bjørner, politician (d. 1959)
- 31 October – C. F. Møller, architect (d. 1988)
- 17 November – Frederik Winkel Horn, historian and translator (born 1845)
- 7 December – Leif B. Hendil, journalist active in the Rescue of the Danish Jews during World War II (died 1961)

== Deaths ==
=== January–March ===
- 17 March – Hansine Andræ, feminist (born 1817)

=== April–June ===
- 3 April – Johan Lange, botanist (born 1848)

=== July–September ===
- 15 August – Arent Nicolai Dragsted, goldsmith (born 1821)
- 18 July – Emil Hartmann, composer (born 1836)
- 29 September – Louise of Hesse-Kassel, queen consort of Christian IX (b. 1863)

=== October–December ===
- 20 October – Severine Casse, women's rights activist (born 1805)
