= 1898 Danish Landsting election =

Landsting elections were held in Denmark on 21 September 1898.

Of the twelve constituencies the seats representing constituencies number 1 (the city of Copenhagen), number 2 (Copenhagen County, Frederiksborg County and Holbæk County), number 4 (Bornholm County), number 7 (Hjørring County and Aalborg County) and number 9 (Aarhus County, Randers County and parts of Viborg County) were up for election.

== Results ==
Party	Seats		
Party	Won	Not up	Total
Højre	14	28	42
Venstre Reform Party	9	4	13
Moderate Venstre	1	7	8
Social Democratic Party	2	0	2
Other parties	1	0	1
Total	27	39	66
Source: Bang
