= R98 =

R98 may refer to:

- R-98 (missile), a Soviet air-to-air missile
- French aircraft carrier Clemenceau
- HMS Wager (R98), a destroyer of the Royal Navy
- Renholdningsselskabet af 1898, a Danish waste management company
