= Feilberg =

Feilburg is a surname. Notable people with this surname include:

- Henning Frederik Feilberg (1831–1921), Danish pastor
- Kristen Feilberg (1839–1919), Danish photographer
- Magnus Feilberg (1817–1899), Danish bookseller
- Peter Feilberg (1800–1863), Norwegian newspaper editor, bookseller, and printer

== See also ==
- Carl Feilberg (disambiguation)
