= 1928 in Denmark =

- Decades: 1900s; 1910s; 1920s; 1930s; 1940s
- See also: Other events of 1928; List of years in Denmark

Events from the year 1928 in Denmark.

== Incumbents ==
- Monarch – Christian X
- Prime minister – Thomas Madsen-Mygdal

== Events ==
- 20 March – Haandarbejdets Fremme is founded.
- 21 September – The 1928 Landsting election is held.

=== Date unknown ===
- Dronningborg Boldklub football club is established.

== Sports ==
- 28 July – 12 August – Denmark wins three gold medals, one silver medal and two bronze medals at the 1928 Summer Olympics.

== Births ==
- 25 February – Paul Elvstrøm, yachtsman (died 2016)
- 11 May – Nils Foss, engineer, company founder (died 2018)
- 25 March – Gunnar Nielsen, athlete (died 1985)
- 3 August – Henning Moritzen, actor (died 2012)
- 3 October – Erik Bruhn, ballet dancer (died 1986)
- 4 October – Torben Ulrich, tennis player, writer, musician, filmmaker (died 2023)
- 25 October – Peter Naur, computer science pioneer (died 2016)
- 7 November – Grethe Krogh, organist and professor (died 2018)

== Deaths ==
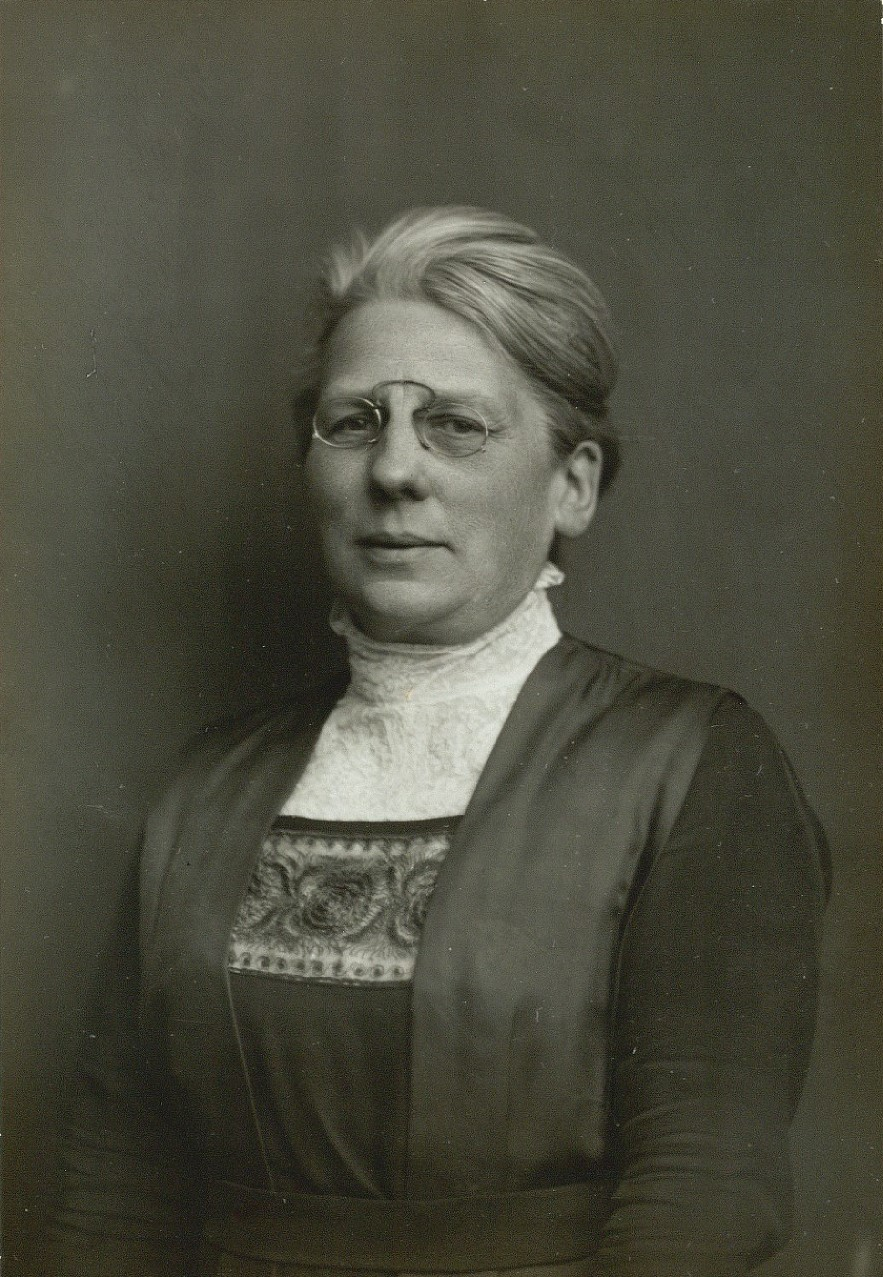
Nina Bang.

=== January–March ===
- 13 January – Johan Peter Koch, captain and arctic explorer (born 1870)
- 30 January – Johannes Fibiger, physician (born 1867)
- 25 March – Nina Bang, politician (born 1866)

=== April–June ===
- 29 April – Fanny Garde, ceramist and designer (born 1855)

=== July–September ===
- 2 July – Anton Rosen, architect (born 1859)
- 5 July – Valdemar Andersen, artist (born 1875)

=== October–December ===
- 6 October – Peter Hansen, painter (born 1868)
- 13 October – Maria Feodorovna, Empress of Russia (born 1847)
- 15 November – Godfred Christensen, painter (born 1845)
