= 1986 in Denmark =

- Decades: 1960s; 1970s; 1980s; 1990s; 2000s
- See also: Other events of 1986; List of years in Denmark

Events from the year 1986 in Denmark.

== Incumbents ==
- Monarch – Margrethe II
- Prime minister – Poul Schlüter

== Sport ==
- 30 March – 5 April – With three gold medals, three silver medals and three bronze medals, Denmark finishes as the best nation at the 10th European Badminton Championships in Uppsala, Sweden.

=== Badminton ===
- Gentofte BK wins the Europe Cup.
- 16 March – Morten Frost wins gold in men's singles at the 1986 All England Open Badminton Championships.

=== Cycling ===
- April – Kim Andersen wins Paris–Camembert.
- August – Jørgen Marcussen wins Trofeo Matteotti.
- Danny Clark (AUS) and Tony Doyle (GBR) win the Six Days of Copenhagen six-day track cycling race.
- Denmark wins one gold medal, one silver medal and one bronze medal at the 1986 UCI Track Cycling World Championships.

=== Equestrian sports ===
- Date unknown – Anne Grethe Jensen wins a gold medal at the World Dressage Championships in Cavan Monaghan, Canada.

== Births ==
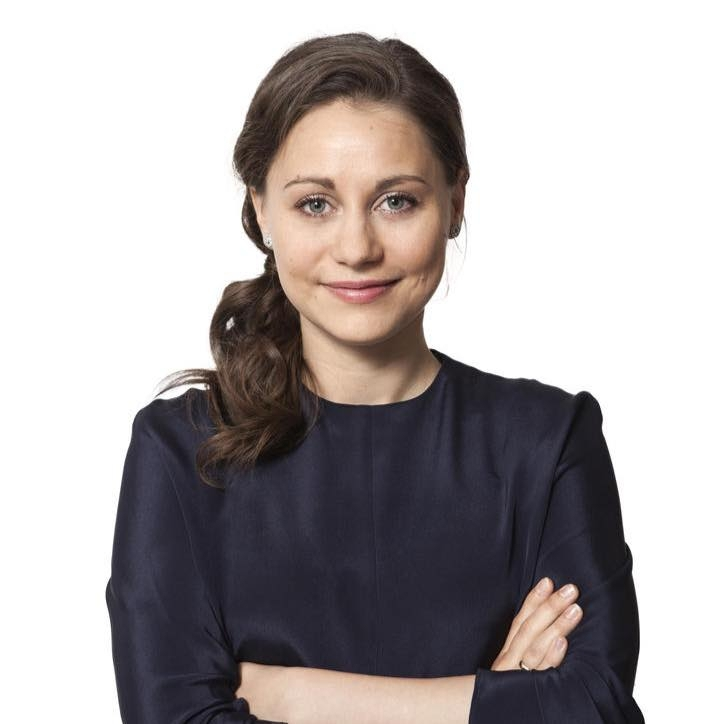
Sisse Marie Welling.

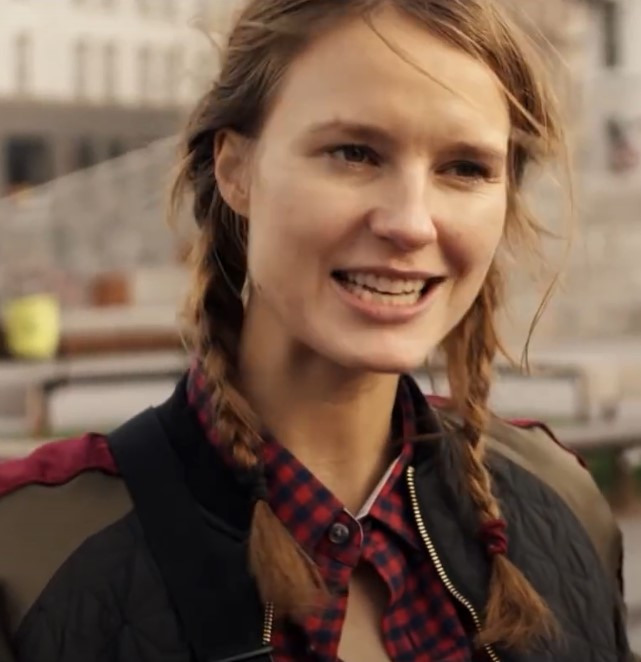
Amanda Collin.

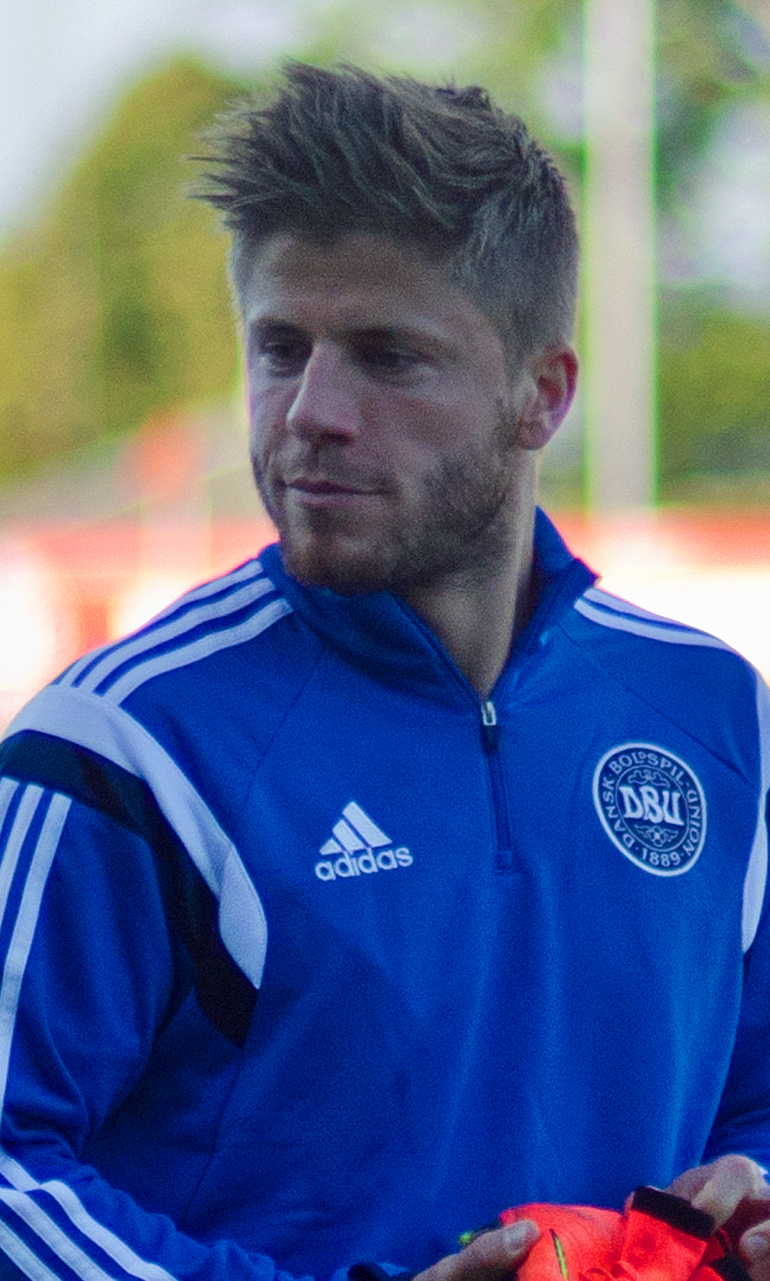
Lasse Schöne.

=== January–March ===
- 16 January – Hans-Kristian Vittinghus, badminton player
- 9 February – Stina Lykke Borg, footballer
- 25 February – Sisse Marie Welling, Lord Mayor of Copenhagen
- 4 March – Amanda Collin, actress
- 12 March – Kasper Irming Andersen, handball player
- 15 March – Jannik Hansen, ice hockey player

=== April–July ===
- 14 April – Michael Færk Christensen, cyclist
- 16 April – Peter Regin, ice hockey player
- 18 April – Denice Klarskov, pornographic film actress
- 20 April – Jonas Aaen Jørgensen, racing cyclist
- 3 May – Mads Christiansen, handballer
- 6 May – Marie Bjerre, politician
- 12 May – Christinna Pedersen, badminton player
- 27 May – Lasse Schöne, footballer
- 11 June – Leon Jessen, footballer
- 20 July – Theresa Eslund, footballer

=== September–December ===
- 18 September – Tobias Mikkelsen, footballer
- 27 September – Olga Ravn, author
- 27 September – Natasha Thomas, singer and songwriter
- 15 October – Janni Arnth, footballer
- 5 November – Kasper Schmeichel, footballer
- 2 December – Ken Ilsø, footballer
- 18 December – Henrik Toft Hansen, handball player

== Deaths ==
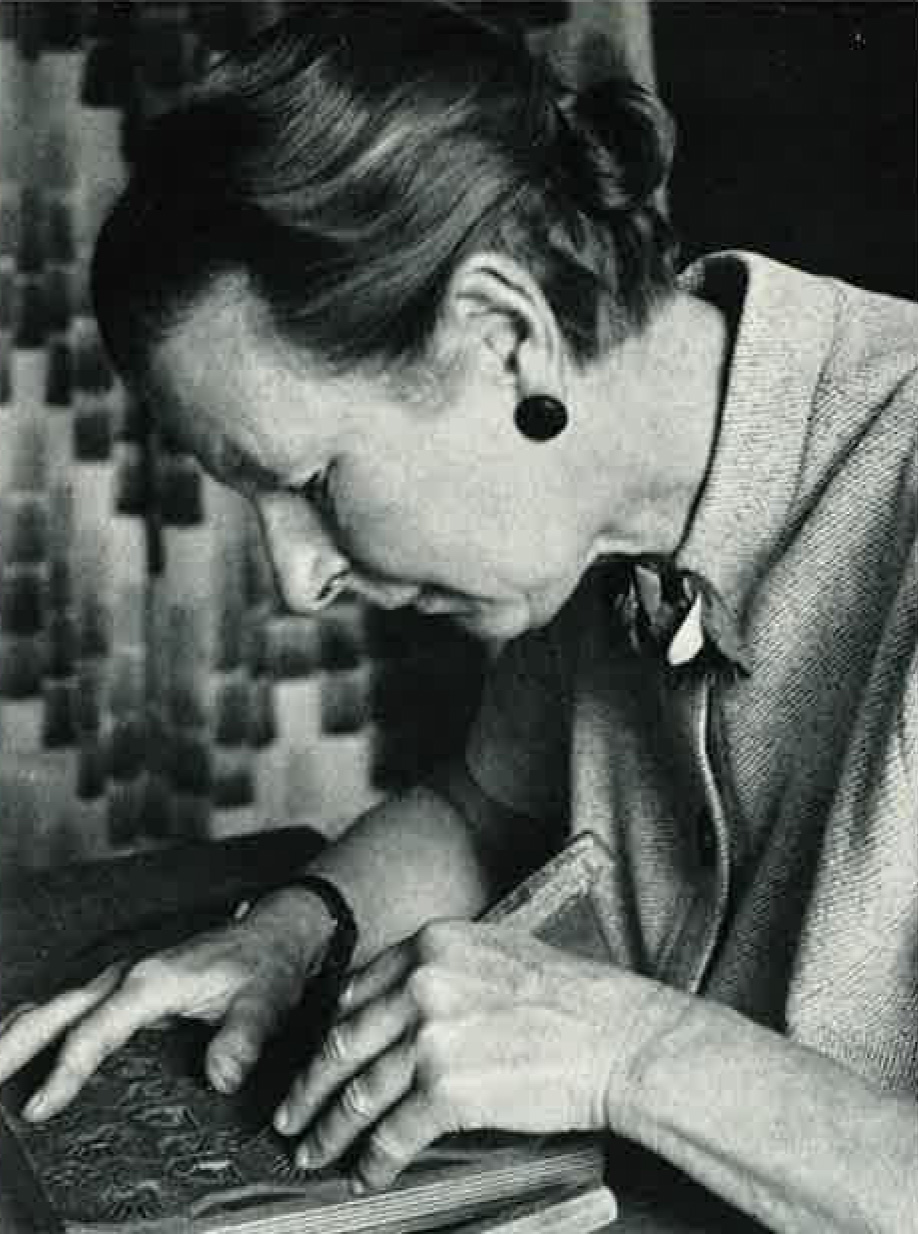
Gudrun Stig Aagaard-

- 1 April (in Canada) – Erik Bruhn, ballet dancer, choreographer, company director, actor (born 1928)
- 19 April – Gudrun Stig Aagaard, textile artist (born 1895)
- 27 July – Anna Sofie Boesen Dreijer, textile artist (born 1899)
- 29 September – Prince Georg of Denmark (born 1920)
- 13 October – Peter Hvidt, architect and furniture designer (died 1916)

== See also ==
- 1986 in Danish television
