= 1810 in Denmark =

- Decades: 1790s; 1800s; 1810s; 1820s; 1830s
- See also: Other events of 1810; List of years in Denmark

The following events occurred in Denmark in the year 1810.

== Incumbents ==
- Monarch – Frederick VI
- Prime minister – Christian Günther von Bernstorff, Frederik Moltke (from 27 April)

== Events ==
- 4 April – The County of Roepstorff is established by Christian Alexander Roepstorff from the manors of Einsidelsborg and Kørup.

== Births ==
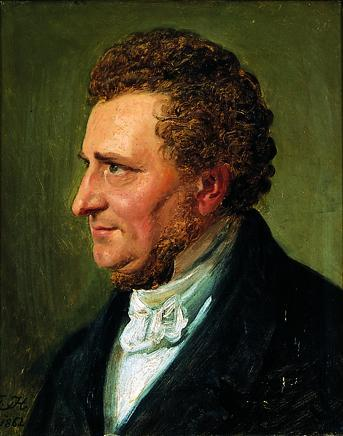
Orla Lehmann.

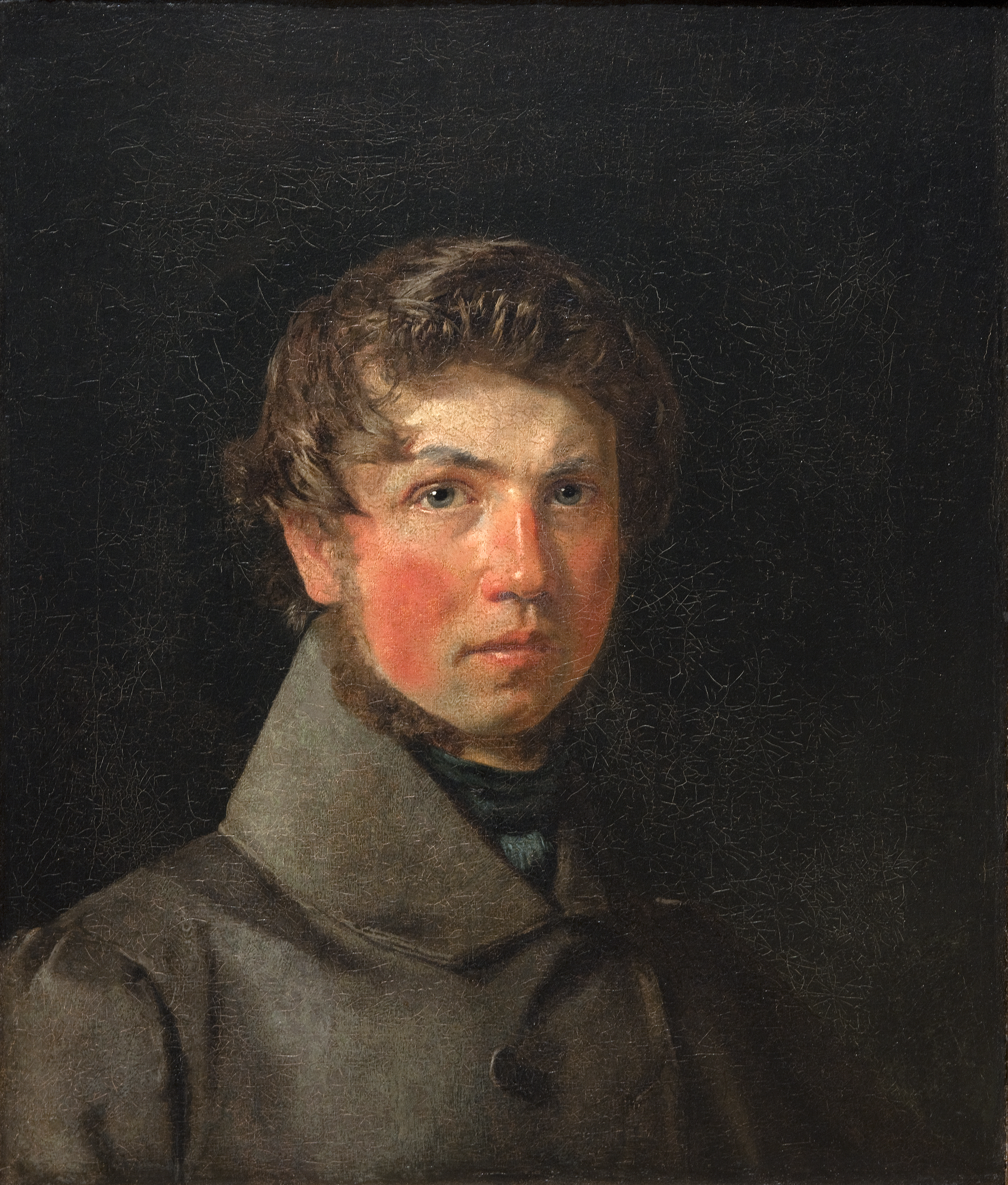
Christen Købke.

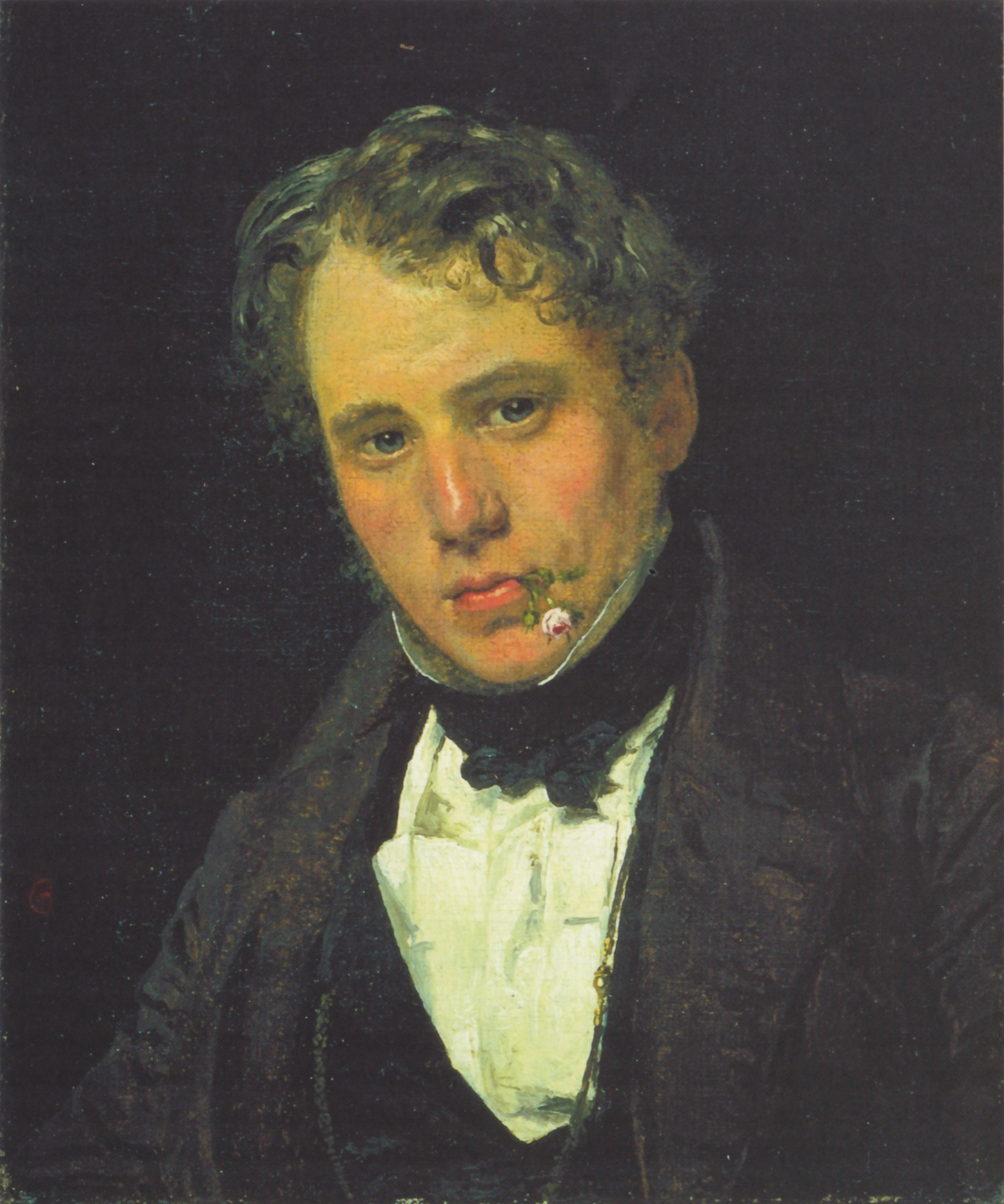
Wilhelm Marstrand.

=== January–March ===
- 29 January – Julius Friedlænder, painter (died 1861)

=== April–June ===
- 2 May – Hans Christian Lumbye, composer of waltzes, polkas, mazurkas and galops, including the Champagne Galop (died 1874)
- 15 May – Orla Lehmann, statesman and key figure in the development of Denmark's parliamentary government (died 1870)
- 26 May – Christen Købke, painter (died 1848)

=== July–September ===
- 20 August – Carl Adolph Feilberg, businessman (died 1896)
- 10 September
  - Carl Edvard Marius Levy, physician (died 1865)
    - Wolfgang von Haffner, military officer (died 1887)
- 11 September – Albert Heinrich Riise, pharmacist (died 1882)
- 19 September – Jens Peter Trap, royal secretary, topographical writer and publisher (died 1885)

=== October–December ===
- 3 October – Otto Didrik Schack, 7th Count of Schackenborg, count (died 1856)
- 7 October – Peter Faber, songwriter, telegraphy pioneer (died 1877)
- 24 December – Wilhelm Marstrand, painter and illustrator (died 1873)

=== Full date missing ===
- Thomas Jacobsen, violin maker (died 1953)

== Deaths ==
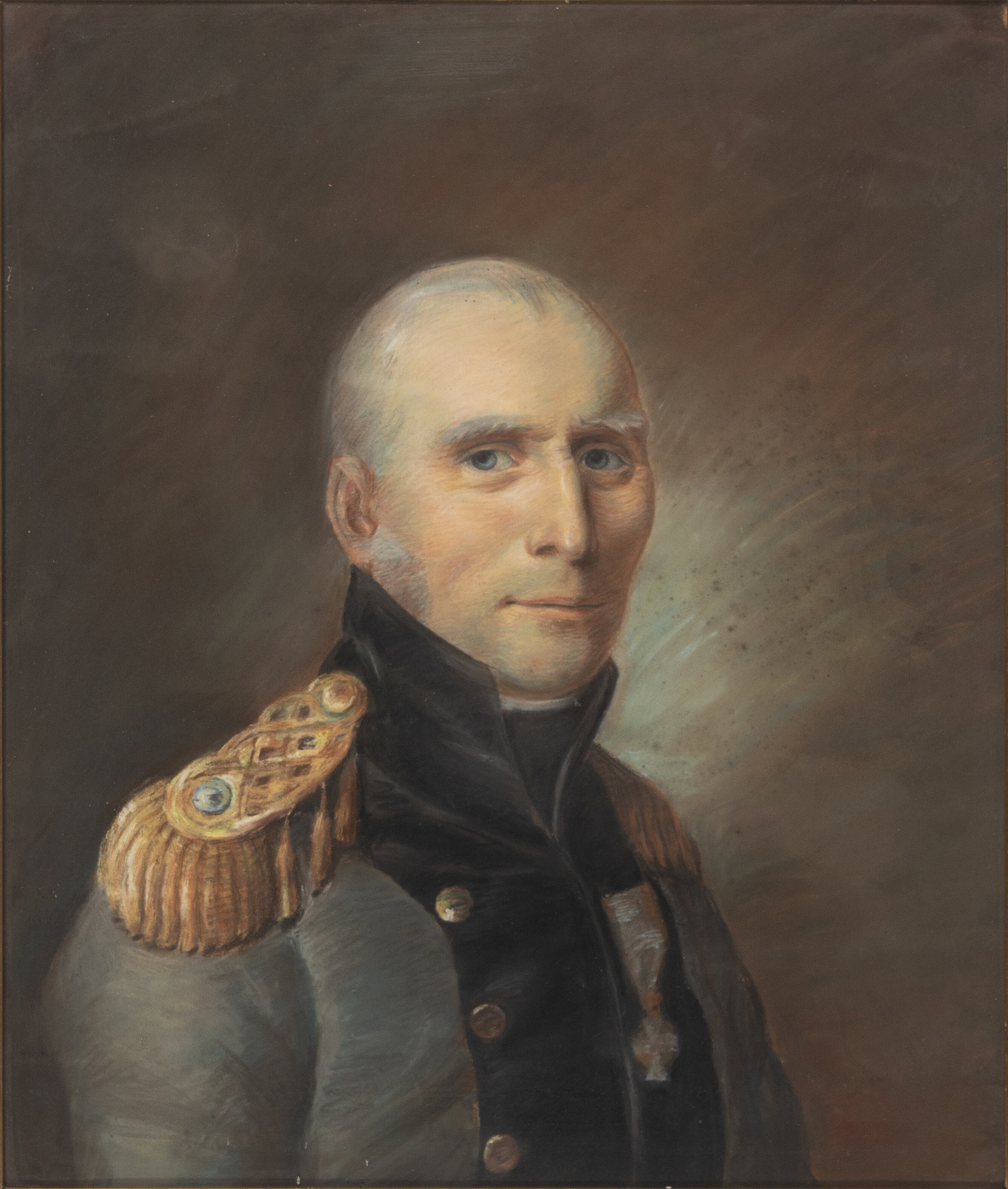
Andreas Kirkerup.

- 4 May – Christian Hansen, businessman (born 1728)
- 10 October – Jacob Gude, government official and memoirist (born 1754)
- 22 October – Andreas Kirkerup, architect (born 1749)
- 26 October – Peter Hansen, bishop (born 1746)
