= 1985 Copenhagen bombings =

1985 terrorist attack in Copenhagen, Denmark

- Location: Copenhagen, Denmark
- Date: 22 July 1985; 10:20, 10:31 (CET)
- Target: Great Synagogue, Northwest Orient Airlines offices, El Al offices (averted)
- Attack type: Bombings
- Deaths: 1
- Injuries: 26
- Perpetrators: Abu Talb, Marten Imandi, Mahmoud Mougrabi, Hezbollah
- Motive: Palestinian nationalism, Anti-Semitism, Anti-Zionism

On 22 July 1985, two bombs exploded in a terrorist attack in Copenhagen, Denmark. One of the bombs exploded near the Great Synagogue and a Jewish nursing home and kindergarten, and another at the offices of Northwest Orient Airlines. At least one more bomb, planned for the El Al airline offices, was discovered. One person was killed and 26 people were injured in the attacks. Sweden-based Palestinians Abu Talb and Marten Imandi were sentenced to life imprisonment in Sweden for the bombings, which were part of a series of attacks in 1985 and 1986, while two co-conspirators received lesser sentences of one and six years imprisonment.

== Bombings ==
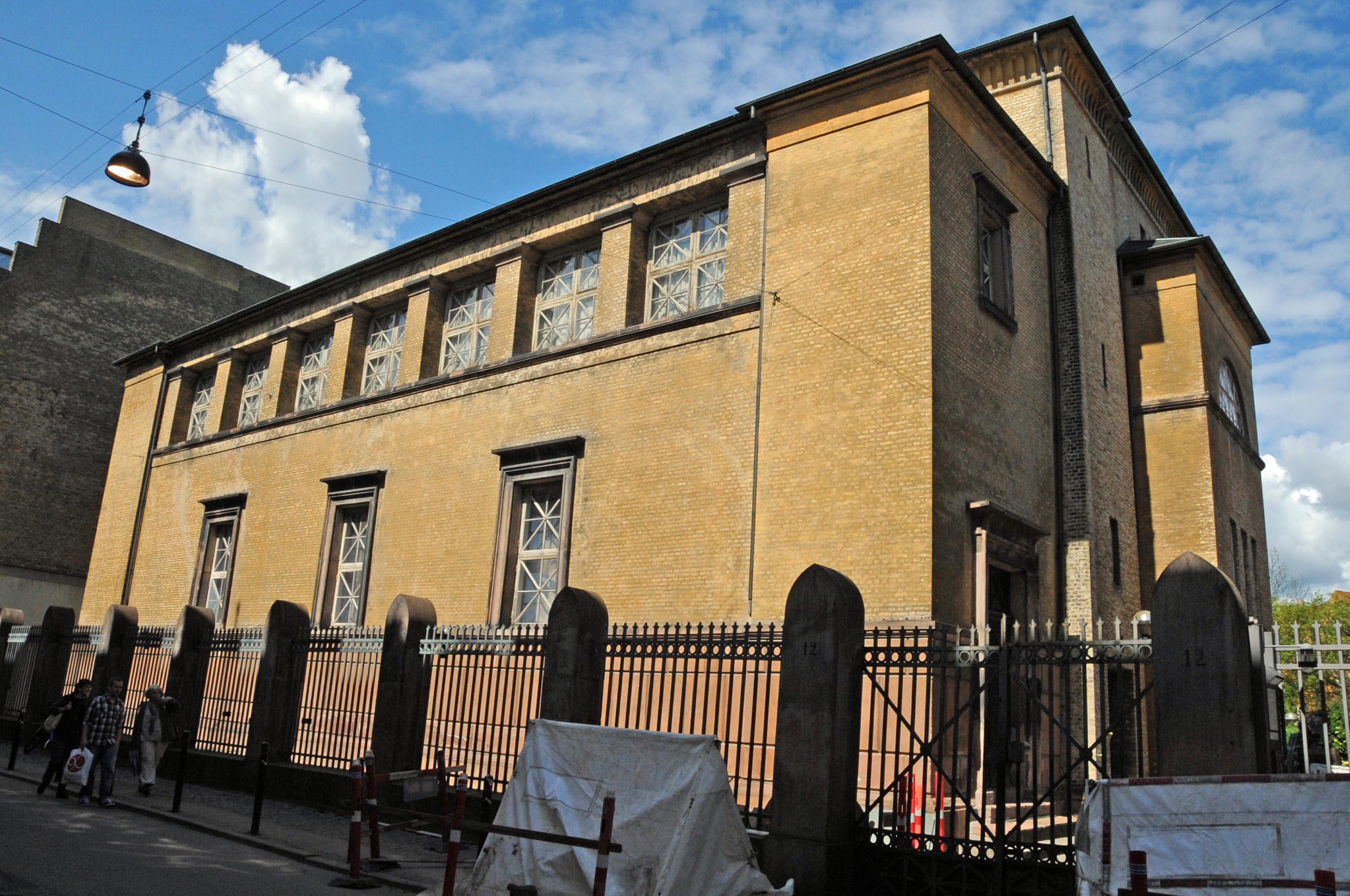
The Great Synagogue of Copenhagen (2009).

The first bomb exploded at the offices of Northwest Orient Airlines, then the sole American airline with offices in Copenhagen, at 10:20. Ten minutes later, at 10:31, the Great Synagogue of Copenhagen, the oldest synagogue in Scandinavia, and the neighboring Meyers Minne Nursing Home were struck by another explosion. In addition, at least one unexploded bomb was located by the police. One of the unexploded bombs was found in a Northwest Orient flight bag pulled from the harbour at Nyhavn. Six foreigners were briefly held for questioning by police, some of whom had attempted to leave the country on the 40-minute hydrofoil boat link to Sweden. Another suspected bomb was reported by news photographers to have been found in a courtyard of Christiansborg Palace, where the Danish Parliament meets.

Danish Prime Minister Poul Schlüter expressed "sorrow that we now experience that Denmark too is hit by terrorist activity," saying that "we have escaped for many years, while unscrupulous men and organizations have spread death and destruction in other European countries."

== Responsibility ==
The Hezbollah-affiliated Islamic Jihad Organization phoned the Beirut offices of the Associated Press to claim responsibility for the attacks, stating that Denmark had been targeted because it had not been struck in previous attacks. However, many experts believe Hezbollah had been "opportunistic" in the event.

Abu Talb, one of the perpetrators, was a member of Palestine Liberation Organization and the Palestinian Popular Struggle Front, both Palestinian nationalist groups. Some experts linked the attacks to the PFLP-GC, a Palestinian nationalist militant organisation whose member was arrested in Sweden. The Palestinian Popular Struggle Front group has also been implicated as responsible for the attacks.

In 2000, during the trial for the Pan Am Flight 103 bombing, Talb claimed that his sister-in-law had been shot and killed in Israel directly by the Israeli Prime Minister Ehud Barak. Talb is also mentioned as having links with both the Popular Front for the Liberation of Palestine – General Command and the Palestinian Popular Struggle Front, which had both been known to carry out terrorist attacks around the time of the bombing. This, along with all four people arrested for the bombing being Palestinians, suggests that the attack to have been motivated by Palestinian nationalism.

== Investigation and trial ==
Although traces early on pointed towards Sweden, the breakthrough in the investigation did not come until 1988 when Marten Imandi was arrested in Rødbyhavn while attempting to smuggle three people through Denmark. Police took his fingerprint, which was found to match a fingerprint from the suitcase bomb found in Nyhavn. Police in Uppsala, Sweden thereafter arrested three other suspects. The four men, all Palestinians, were put on trial in Sweden.

One of the suspects, Mahmoud Mougrabi eventually confessed to the attacks, himself having attempted to detonate a bomb at the offices of Israeli airline company El Al before being detected, causing him to defuse the bomb and throw it in the ocean off the Nyhavn harbour. The 15 kilogram bomb, the most powerful of the three bombs was retrieved by police, which together with Mougrabi's testimony was key evidence in the trial. Imandi and Abu Talb were sentenced to life imprisonment in December 1989 as the main perpetrators of the bombings. Mahmoud Mougrabi and his brother Moustafa were sentenced to six and one year imprisonment respectively for co-conspiracy in attacks in 1985 and 1986, including bombings in Stockholm and Amsterdam.
