= 1895 in Denmark =

- Decades: 1870s; 1880s; 1890s; 1900s; 1910s
- See also: Other events of 1895; List of years in Denmark

Events from the year 1895 in Denmark.

== Incumbents ==
- Monarch – Christian IX
- Prime minister – Tage Reedtz-Thott

== Events ==
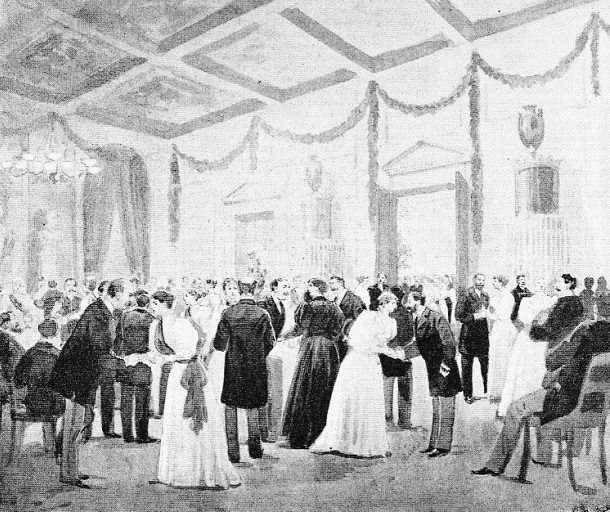
Sketch of the Women's Exhibition from Illustreret Tidende

- 1 April – The political struggle between Landstinget and Folketinget culminates with the government's dissolution of Rigsdagen and the adoption of a temporary national budget.
- 22 June – Opening of the 1895 Copenhagen Women's Exhibition.

== Sports ==
- 15 October – Kolding IF is founded.

=== Date unknown ===
- Christian Ingemann wins a silver medal in men's sprint at the amateur event of the 1895 ICA Track Cycling World Championships.

== Births ==
- 13 January – Gudrun Stig Aagaard, textile artist (died 1986)
- 21 February – Henrik Dam, biochemist and physiologist (died 1976)
- 24 March – Else Schøtt, operatic soprano (died 1989)
- 9 July – Gunnar Aaby, footballer (died 1966)
- 25 July – Ingeborg Spangsfeldt, actress (died 1968)
- 17 September – Princess Margaret of Denmark (died 1992)
- 4 October – Jens Søndergaard, painter (died 1957)
- 5 October – Marie Gudme Leth, textile printer (died 1997)
- 10 November – Kjeld Ammentorp, businessman (died 1975)

== Deaths ==
- 1 January – Niels Peder Christian Holsøe, architect (born 1826)
- 28 August – Clara Andersen, dramatist and novelist (born 1826)
- 2 November – Carl Frederik Aagaard, painter (born 1833)
- 4 December – Johannes Helms, writer and schoolmaster (born 1828)
