= 1899 in Denmark =

- Decades: 1870s; 1880s; 1890s; 1900s; 1910s
- See also: Other events of 1899; List of years in Denmark

The following events occurred in Denmark in the year 1899.

== Incumbents ==
- Monarch – Christian IX
- Prime minister – Hugo Egmont Hørring

== Events ==
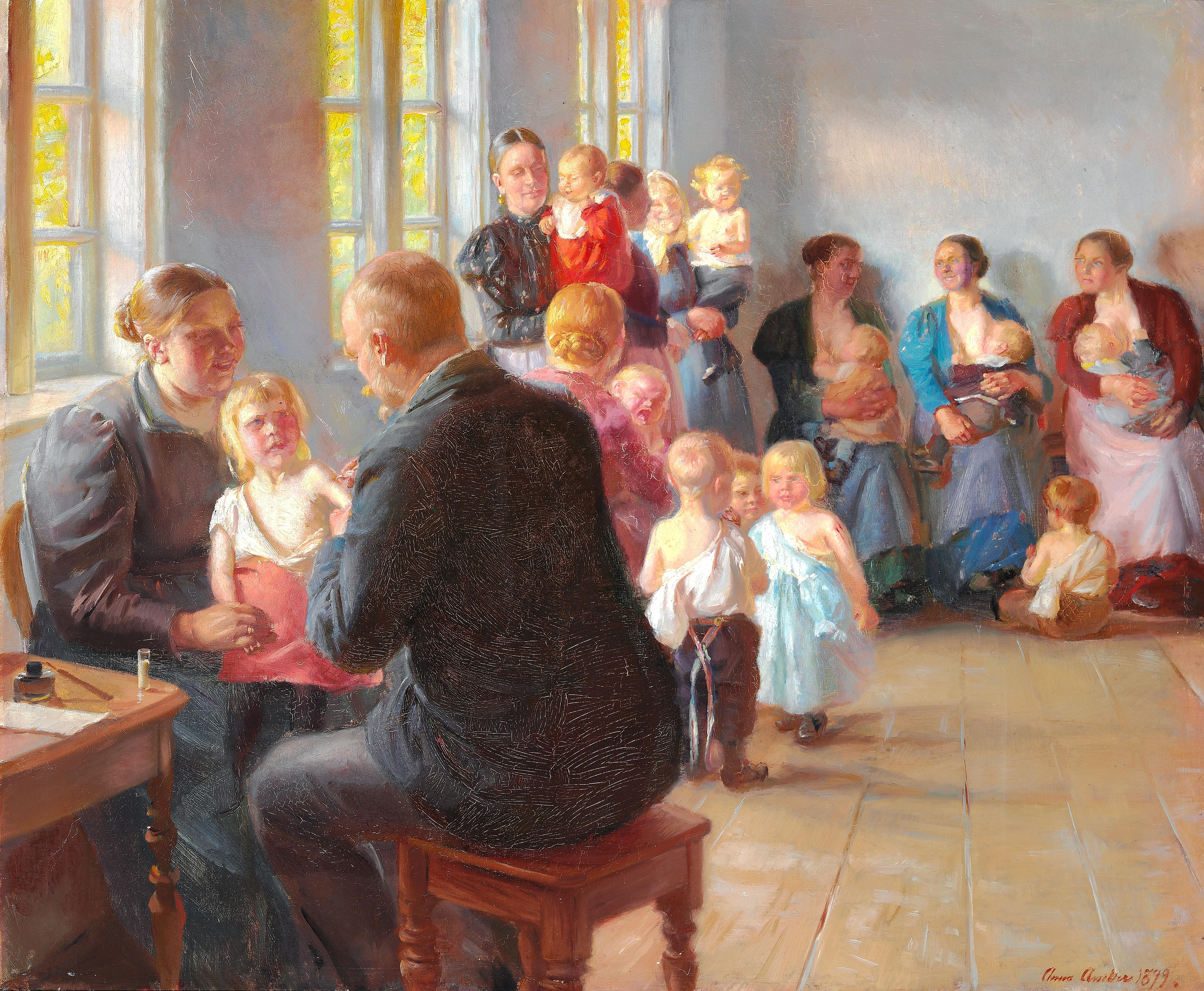
En vaccination, Anna Ancher

March

- March – The annual Charlottenborg Spring Exhibition opens. Anna Ancher's A Vaccination has already prior to the opening of the exhibition been sold to a Swedish collector, a fact reported in several newspapers.

May

- 18 May – The Odsherred Railway opens.

June

- 4 June – KFUMs Boldklub København is founded.

July

- 21 July – The Danish Nurses' Organization is established.

September

- 5 September – The first labour and management agreement in Denmark is reached between the Danish Federation of Trade Unions and the Danish Employers' Confederation.

November

- 22 November – J. P. Suhr & Søn is dissolved.

=== Undated ===
- The Women's Council in Denmark is established.

== Culture ==
=== Culture ===
- The Thorvaldsen Exhibition Medal is awarded to [[]] for his equestrian statue of Christian IX].

== Sports ==
- Akademisk Boldklub wins the 1898–99 Football Tournament.

== Births ==
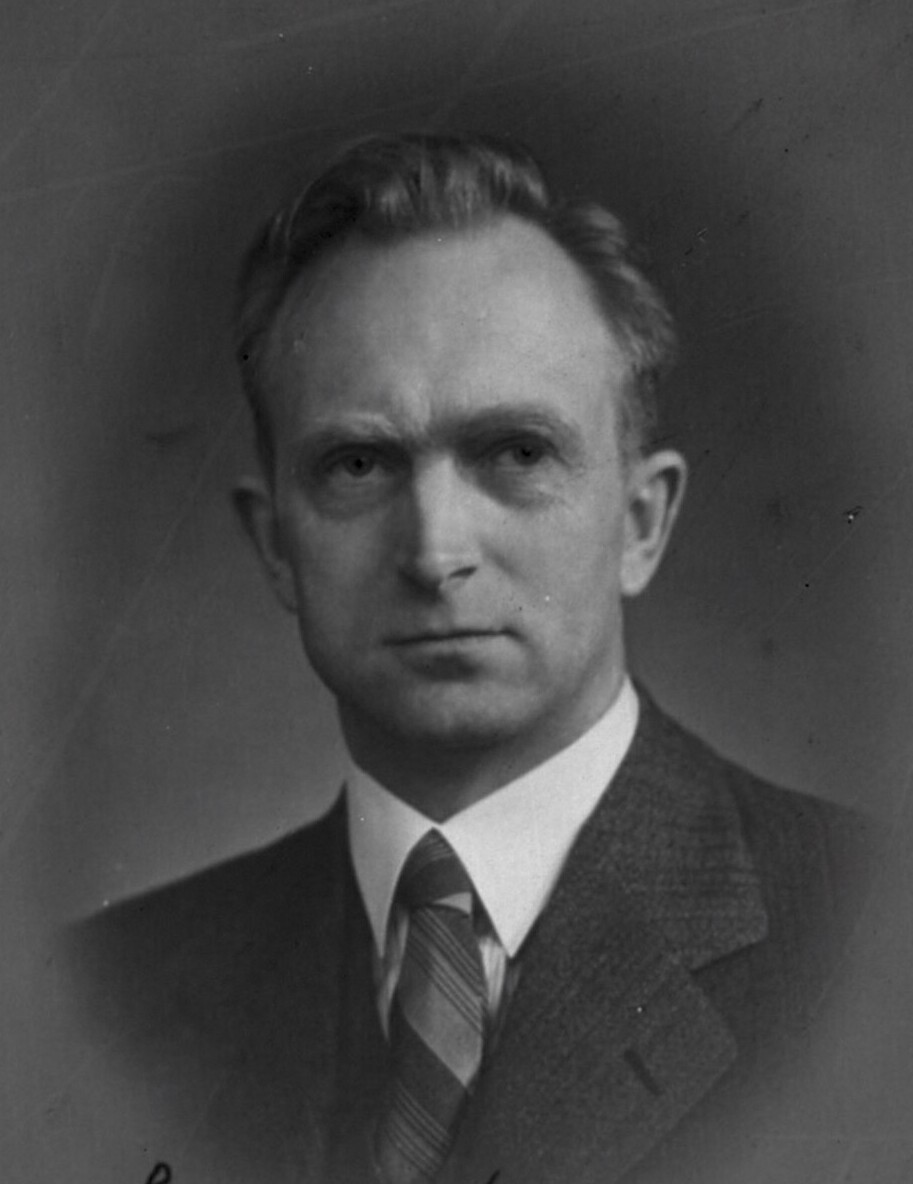
Thorkil Kristensen.

=== January–March ===
- 30 January – Anna Sofie Boesen Dreijer, textile artist (died 1986)
- 8 February – Henry Lorenzen, actor (died 1961 in West Germany)
- 25 February – Hans Lunding, military officer and member of the resistance movement (died 1989)
- 2 March – Harald Agersnap, composer, educator and musician (died 1982)
- 10 March – Finn Høffding, composer (died 1997)
- 11 March – Frederik IX, King of Denmark (died 1972)
- 19 March – Aksel Sandemose, author (died 1965)

=== April–June ===
- 30 April – Olaf Wieghorst, painter (died 1988)
- 10 June –, Alf Ross, jurist and philosopher (died 1979)

=== July–September ===
- 27 July – Carl Johan Hviid, actor (died 1964)
- 2 September – Hans Jacob Nielsen, boxer (died 1967)
- 8 September – Hans Bjerrum, hockey player and businessman (died 1979)

=== October–December ===
- 9 October – Thorkil Kristensen, politician (died 1989)

== Deaths ==
=== January–March ===
- 16 June – August Winding, priest and composer (born 1835)
- 22 March – Anna Henriette Levinsohn, opera singer (born 1839)

=== July–September ===
- 17 August – Erik Bøgh, journalist, playwright and songwriter (born 1822)
- 2 September – HDMS Herluf Trolle is launched from Orlogsværftet in Copenhagen.
- 14 September – Vilhelm Groth, painter (born 1842)

=== October–December ===
- 21 October – Edvard Jünger, precision mechanic (born 1823)
- 18 November – Hans Peter Hansen, xylographer (born 1829)
- 29 December – Vilhelm Christesen, silver smith (born 1822)
