= Carl Feilberg (disambiguation) =

Carl Feilberg may refer to:

- Carl Adolph Feilberg (1810–1896), Danish businessman
- Carl Feilberg (1844–1887), Danish-Australian journalist
- Carl Gunnar Feilberg (1894–1972), geographer and explorer
