= Denice Klarskov =

Danish pornographic film actress (born 1986)

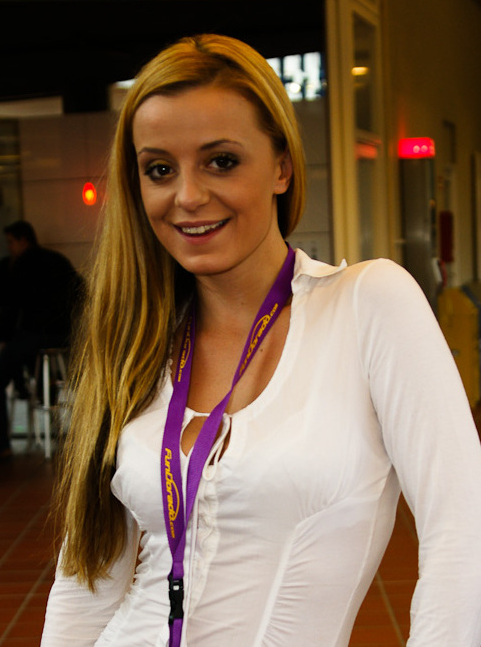
- Klarskov in 2009
- Born: 18 April 1986 (age 40); Denmark
- Other names: Denice K., Denise Klarskov, Denise K., Denise Kiarskov, Denise Klasko
- Website: clubdenice.dk

Denice Klarskov (born 18 April 1986) is a Danish pornographic actress and entrepreneur.

== Life and career ==
Klarskov started her career at 16 as a photo model, appearing in several major magazines and entering the finals of the beauty contest Miss Solskin. She starred in her first pornographic film at the age of 18 years. From 2004, onward, she worked internationally in the adult industry, traveling for productions and collaborations while remaining based in Denmark.adult industry.

Klarskov is the founder and the owner of "DK Production", a Danish porn production company.

She has worked one week as a guest radio hostess for the radio show Anne og de herreløse hunde - nu uden Anne on ANR (Aalborg Nærradio). In 2012, Klarskov was the subject of an episode of Emil Thorup's documentary series Emils damer, broadcast by DR HD.

She is married and lives in Lundby, Vordingborg.

== Awards ==
- 2008 XRCO Award nomination - Unsung Siren
- 2010 AVN Award nomination – Best Group Sex Scene - Ben Dover's Busty Babes
