= Hjørring County =

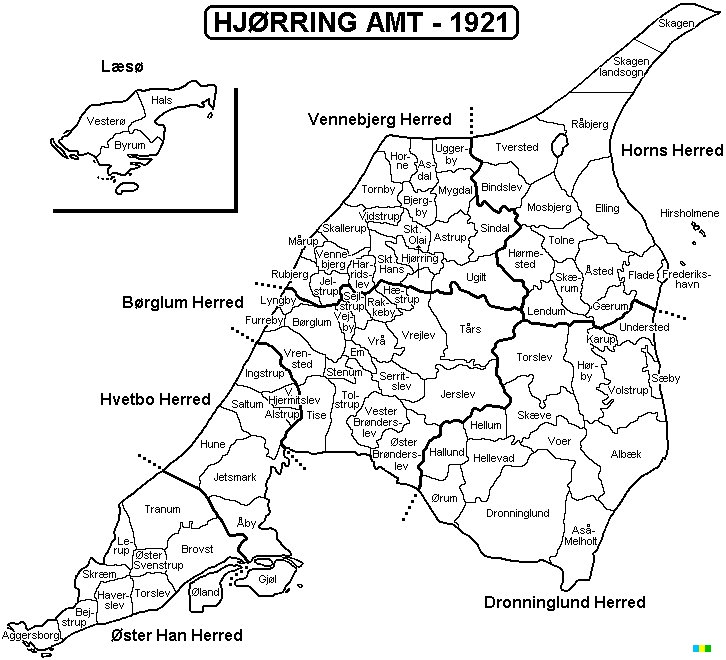
Hjørring County

Hjørring County (Danish: Hjørring Amt) is a former province in Denmark, located on the northern tip of Jutland and encompassing most of the island of Vendsyssel-Thy and the island of Læsø. Hjørring County was established in 1793 and abolished in 1970 when it merged with Aalborg County forming the new North Jutland County.

The region belonged to Vendsyssel during the Middle Ages. In 1542, the north Jutland region was reorganised as Aalborghus Len. This province was divided in 1662 forming Aalborghus County and Aastrup, Sejlstrup and Børglum County.

The latter province was divided again in 1793 and the bulk of its territory was reorganised as Hjørring County. Smaller parts of the province became parts of the counties of Thisted and Aalborg. This division lasted from 1793 to 1970 when the Hjørring and Aalborg Counties merged, forming the new North Jutland County.

Hjørring County featured the market towns (købstæder) of Brønderslev, Frederikshavn, Hjørring, Skagen, and Sæby.

== List of former hundreds (herreder) ==
- Børglum Herred
- Dronninglund Herred
- Horns Herred
- Hvetbo Herred
- Læsø Herred
- Vennebjerg Herred
- Øster Han Herred
