= Ingeborg Frederiksen =

Danish botanical illustrator

Ingeborg Dorthea Frederiksen (9 May 1886 – 29 December 1976) was a Danish painter and botanical illustrator who is remembered for her accurate depictions of flora and fauna in Denmark and Greenland. She painted watercolours of Danish birds and flowers and published drawings of the country's principal trees. For a lengthy period, she provided assistance with the ornithological collections at the Danish Zoological Museum. In 1957, she illustrated Grøonlands Flora.

== Biography ==
Born in the village of Fangel, Odense Municipality, on the Danish island of Funen, Ingeborg Dorthea Frederiksen was the daughter of the carpenter Henrik Frederiksen and his wife Catherine Marie née Caspersen. After training in draftsmanship and engraving at the Tegne- og Kunstindustriskolen for Kvinder, she attended the Royal Danish Academy of Fine Arts from 1908 where she studied under Laurits Tuxen and Valdemar Irminger, graduating in 1913.

While still a student, from 1906 for reasons of health she spent over a year on the Faroe Islands in the home of one of her sisters, returning for the summers of 1909, 1911 and 1913. Several of the works she created there, together with those from her visits to Iceland (1911, 1913, 1921) were shown at the commemorative exhibition arranged by the Danish Ornithological Society in connection with her 90th birthday. From arouhd 1920, Frederiksen worked as a porcelain decorator. In the mid-1920s, recuperating from the effects of a serious illness, she spent an extended period at the Nakkebøllefjord Sanatorium where the director, Otto Helms, was planning books on Danish birds. When she was in her mid-30s, the two embarked on fruitful collaboration which led to Frederiksen's full commitment to flora and fauna. In order to make ends meet during the 1930s, she found employment at the Danish Zoological Museum where she helped with the ornithological collections.

Frederiksen became increasingly popular as an illustrator, working for a wide variety of botanical institutes and related bodies. One of her finest sets of bird illustrations was published in 1952 in Poul Jespersen's Danske Fugle, sjæædnere Arter. The illustrations she included in Grønlands Flora (1957) received positive reviews. Her detailed drawings of trees were published in 1965 in Dansk Dendrologisk Årsskrift.

Ingeborg Frederiksen died in Copenhagen on 29 December 1976.
