= HIT FM Denmark =

Danish radio station

Hit FM is a radio station in Jutland, Denmark. It is divided into three stations, each of which broadcast on their own frequency. There are local departments in Aalborg, Viborg and Herning.

The station plays a variety of genres, including pop, rock, hip hop and R&B. Within these genres, the station focuses on popular mainstream hits.
