= 1983 in Denmark =

- Decades: 1960s; 1970s; 1980s; 1990s; 2000s
- See also: Other events of 1983; List of years in Denmark

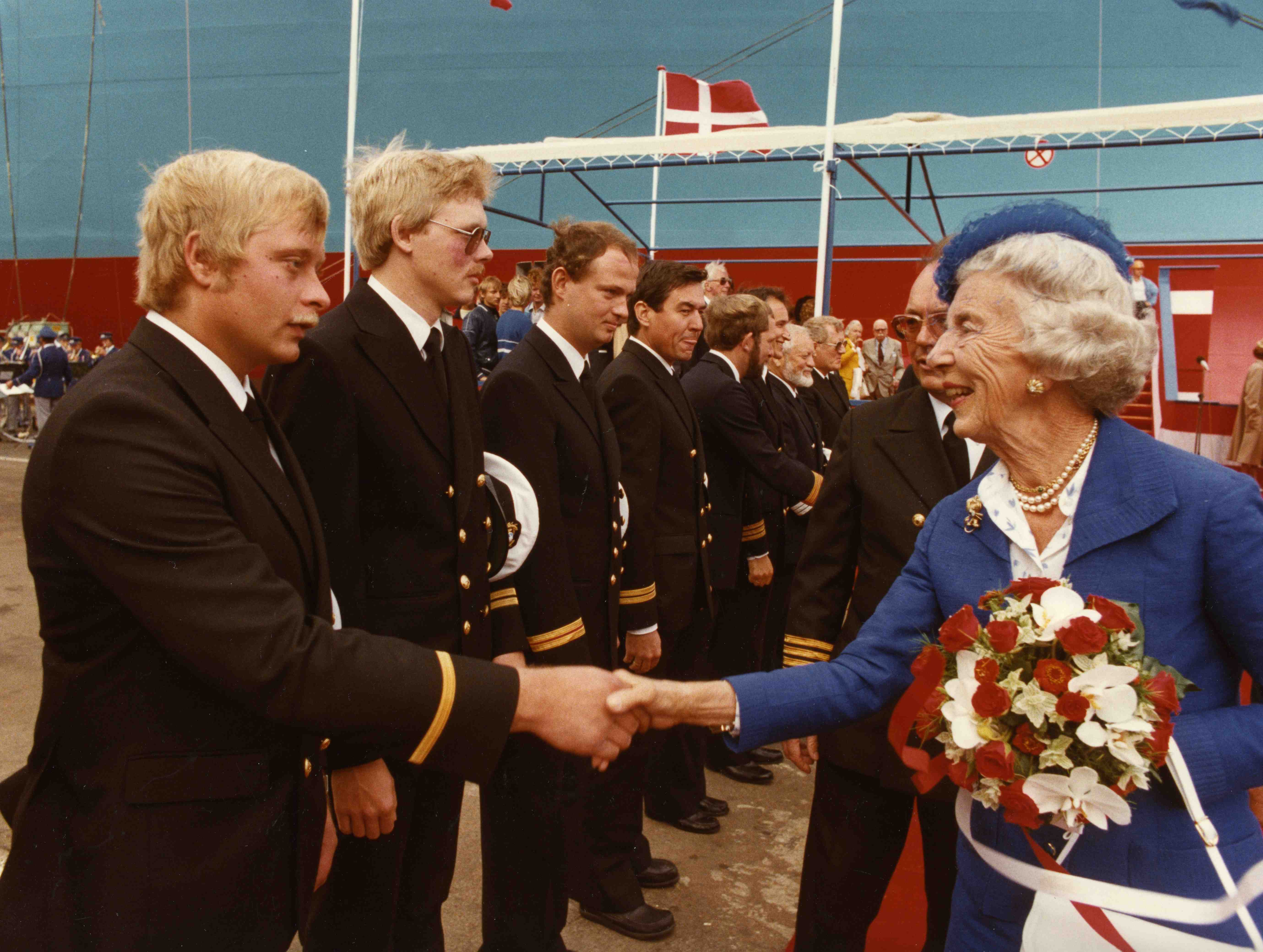
Ingrid of Sweden, Queen Consort of Denmark, greets the crew of the Regina Mærsk in 1983, color photograph

Events from the year 1983 in Denmark.

== Incumbents ==
- Monarch - Margrethe II
- Prime minister - Poul Schlüter

== Sports ==
=== Football ===
- 21 September – Denmark achieves an important 1–0 win against England in Wembley Stadium in Group 3 of the UEFA Euro 1984 qualifying. Denmark's goal is scored by Allan Simonsen.
- 16 November – Denmark qualifies for UEFA Euro 1984 by defeating Greece 2–0 in their last qualification game and thus winning Group 3 one point ahead of England.

=== Badminton ===
- 2– May – The 1983 IBF World Championships takes place in Copenhagen.
  - Steen Fladberg and Jesper Helledie win gold in men's doubles
  - Steen Fladberg and Pia Nielsen win gold in mixed doubles.
- Gentofte BK wins Europe Cup.

=== Cycling ===
- 13 July – Kim Andersen wins Stage 12 of the 1983 Tour de France.
- Gert Frank (DEN) and Patrick Sercu (BEL) win the Six Days of Copenhagen six-day track cycling race.

== Births ==
=== January–March ===
- 20 March – Thomas Kahlenberg, Former footballer

=== April–June ===
- 17 April – Thomas Kristensen, footballer
- 23 April – Leon Andreasen, footballer
- 15 May – Anne Lolk Thomsen, rower
- 17 May – Simon Mathew, pop singer
- 18 May – Agnete Kirk Thinggaard, dressage rider
- 23 May – Joachim Persson, badminton player
- 23 May – Kevin Stuhr Ellegaard, professional footballer
- 31 May – Kim Aabech, footballer
- 6 June – Michael Krohn-Dehli, footballer

=== July–September ===
- 7 July – Jakob Poulsen, former professional footballer
- 24 July – Carsten Mogensen, badminton player
- 27 August – Thomas Mikkelsen, footballer
- 27 August – Frederik Nielsen, tennis player
- 31 August – Lasse Svan Hansen, handball player
- 18 September – Rasmus Würtz, footballer

=== October–December ===
- 4 October – Karsten Lauritzen, politician
- 23 November – Kamilla Rytter Juhl, badminton player
- 19 December – Mia Rosing, model

== Deaths ==
  - 7 April– Elna Pandurom actress and operetta singer (died 1882)
- 16 September – Andreas Friis, painter (born 1890)
- 24 September – Lis Møller, journalist and politician (born 1918)
- 29 November – Aage Rasmussen, photographer and track and field athlete (born 1889)
- 10 November – Carl Erik Soya, author and dramatist (born 1896)

== See also ==
- 1983 in Danish television
