= Aalborg County =

Former province in Denmark

Coordinates: 56.9961921°N 9.9907108°E

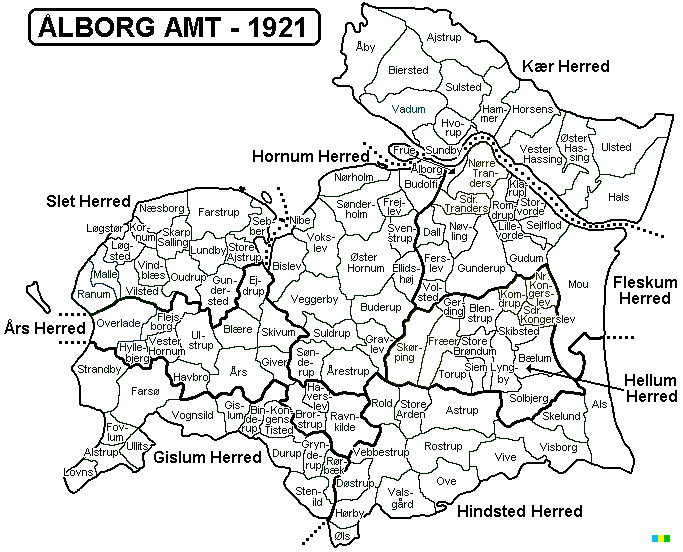
Aalborg County

Aalborg County (Danish: Ålborg Amt, former spelling: Aalborg Amt) is a former province in Denmark, located in north-eastern Jutland around the eastern approach to the Limfjord. Aalborg County was established in 1793 and abolished in 1970 when it merged with Hjørring County forming the new North Jutland County.

== History ==
The region belonged to Himmersyssel during the Middle Ages, with the exception of Kær Herred - located north of the Limfjord - which belonged to Vendsyssel. In 1542, the north Jutland region was reorganised as Aalborghus Len. This province was divided in 1662 forming Aalborghus County and Aastrup, Sejlstrup and Børglum County.

The latter province was divided again in 1793 with the bulk of its territory being reorganized as Hjørring County. Smaller parts of the province became parts of the counties of Thisted and Aalborg. This division lasted from 1793 to 1970 when the two counties merged, forming the new North Jutland County.

Aalborg County featured the market towns (købstæder) of Aalborg, Løgstør, Nibe, and Nørresundby.

== List of former hundreds (herreder) ==
- Års Herred
- Fleskum Herred
- Gislum Herred
- Hellum Herred
- Hindsted Herred
- Hornum Herred
- Kær Herred
- Slet Herred

== Sources ==
- Aalborg Amt in Statistisk-topografisk Beskrivelse af Kongeriget Danmark (otherwise known as Trap Danmark), vol. 3, 3rd ed., 1898–1906

This article incorporates material from the corresponding article on the Danish Wikipedia, accessed January 14, 2007.

== See also ==
- Aalborg Municipality
- Aalborg city
