= 1984 in Denmark =

- Decades: 1960s; 1970s; 1980s; 1990s; 2000s
- See also: Other events of 1984; List of years in Denmark

Events from the year 1984 in Denmark.

== Incumbents ==
- Monarch - Margrethe II
- Prime minister - Poul Schlüter

== Events ==
- 3 January – During a severe storm in Denmark, a Maersk helicopter crashed while Esbjerg was flying to a drilling platform in the Gorem field, and three died.
- 10 January – parliamentary elections in Denmark.
- 12 June – Mayor Villo Sigurdsson decides to fire the unorganized firefighter Max Bleicher Hansen, who responds again with a compensation claim of 6.5 million Danish kroner.
- 6 August – 53 percent of Danish TV viewers vote for the swan as Denmark's national bird
- 1 October – The new natural gas network in Denmark is inaugurated
- 4 December – The Radio Board elects Hans Jørgen Jensen as General Manager of Radio Denmark

== Sports ==
- 28 – 12 July August – Denmark at the 1984 Summer Olympics in Los Angeles: 0 gold medals, 3 silver medals and 3 bronze medals.

=== Badminton ===
- 25 March – Morten Frost wins gold in men's singles at the 1984 All England Open Badminton Championships.
- 8–14 April – With one gold medal, three silver medals and 2 bronze medals, Denmark finishes as the second best nation at the 9th European Badminton Championships in Preston, England.
- Gentofte BK wins silver at Europe Cup.

=== Cycling ===
- Albert Fritz (FRG) and Dietrich Thurau (FRG) win the Six Days of Copenhagen six-day track cycling race.
- April – Kim Andersen wins La Flèche Wallonne.
- Unknown date – Hans-Henrik Ørsted wins gold in Men's individual pursuit at the 1984 UCI Track Cycling World Championships.

=== Football ===
- 12–27 June – Denmark national football team participates at UEFA Euro 1984 in France.
  - 19 June – Denmark qualifies for the semi-finals by defeating Belgium 3–2 in their last game in Group A and thereby finishing second in the group after France.
  - 24 June – Denmark faces Spain in the semi-final and leads for most of the match after an early goal by Søren Lerby but Antonio Maceda scores three minutes before time and Denmark is subsequently defeated 6–4 after a penalty shoot-out.

== Births ==
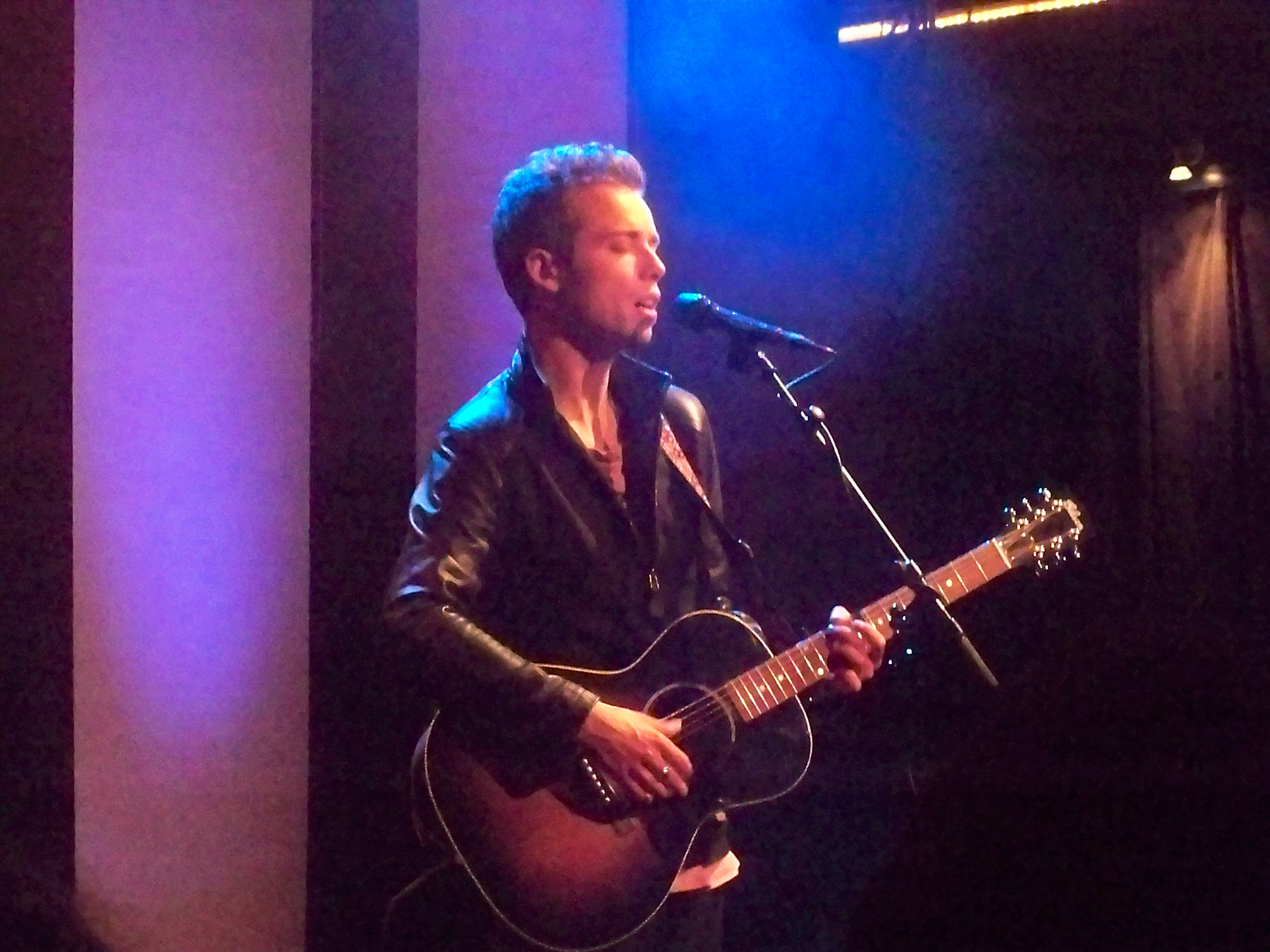
Mads Langer.

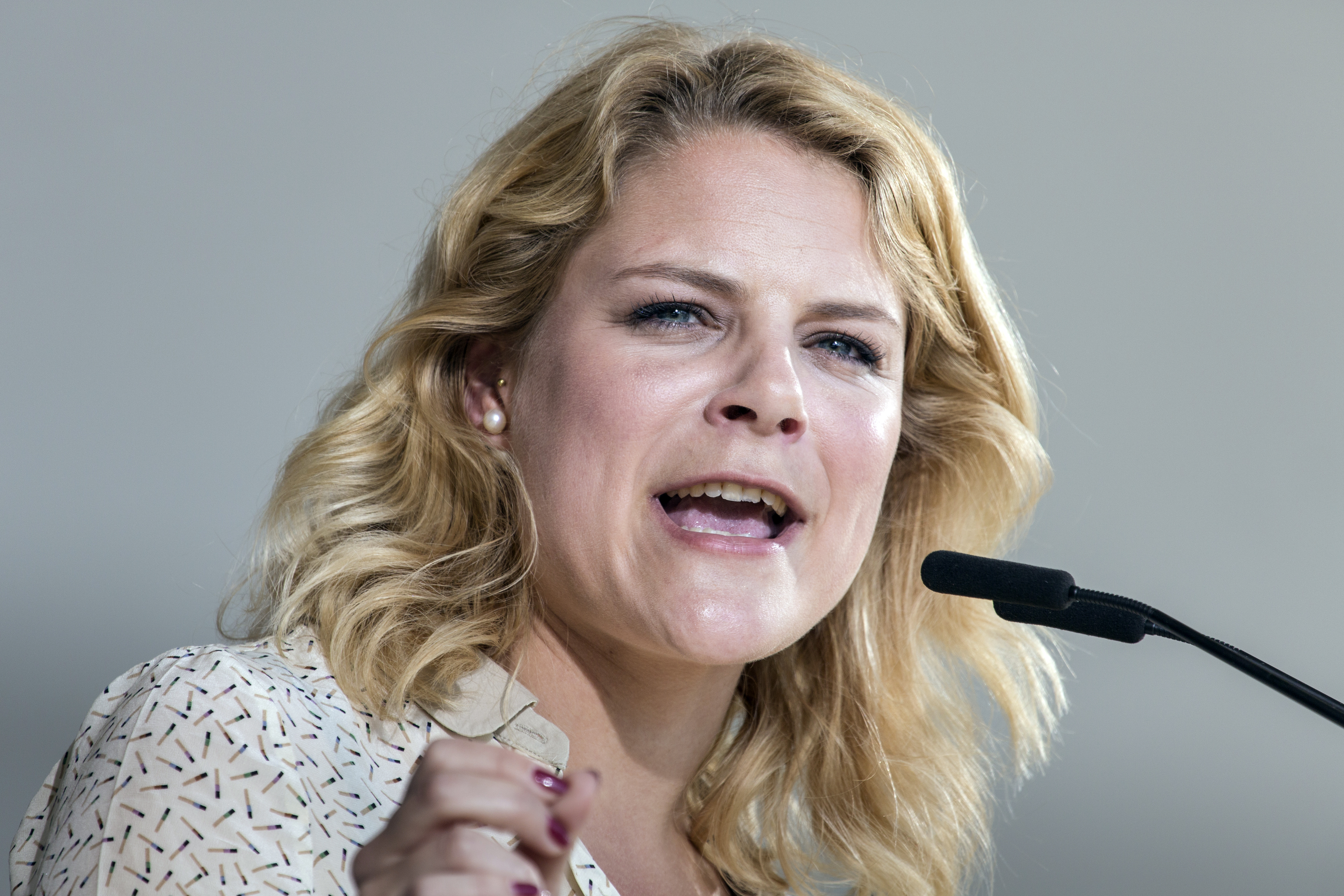
Johanne Schmidt-Nielsen,

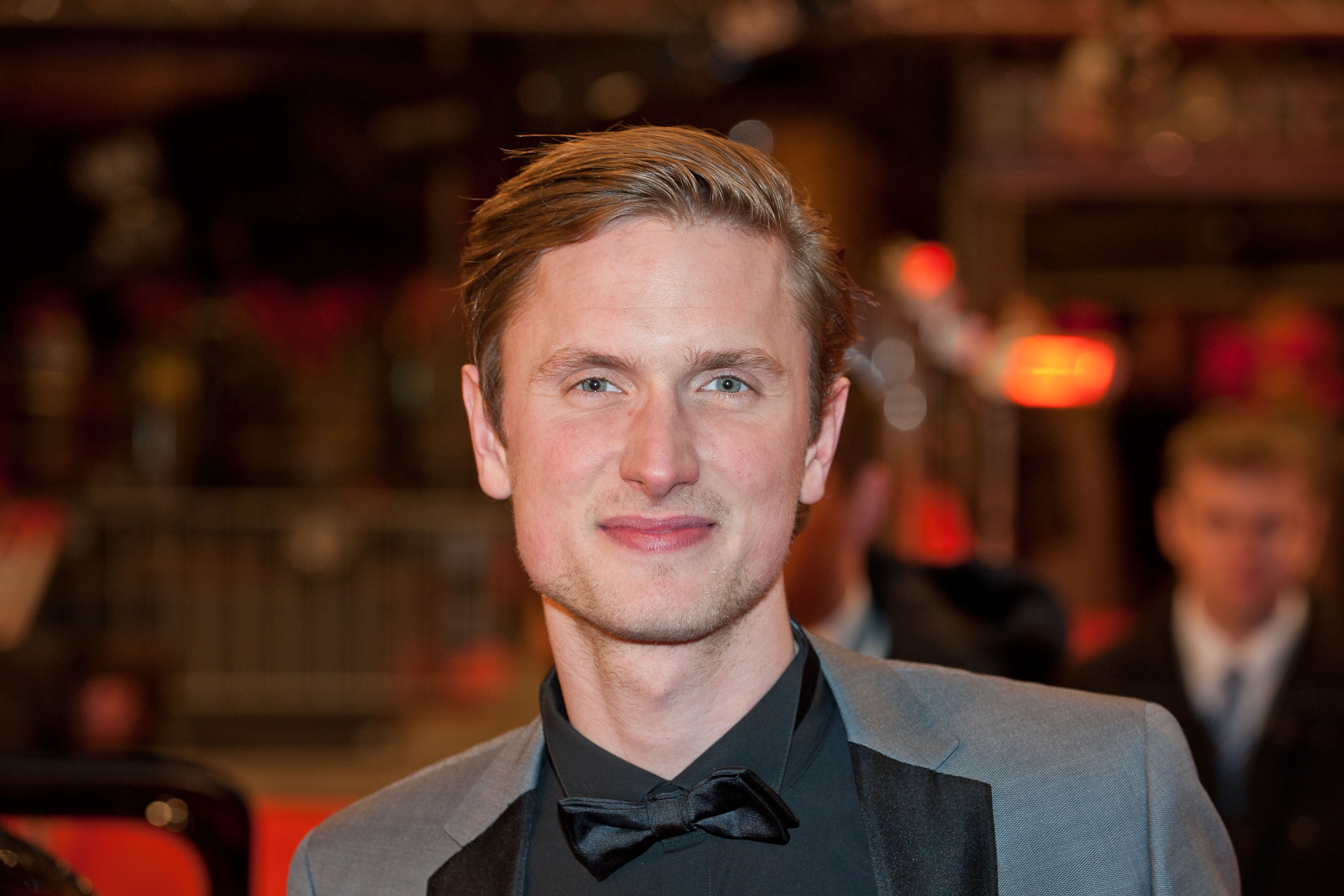
Mikkel Følsgaard,

=== January–March ===
- 14 January – Mads Langer, singer
- 22 February – Johanne Schmidt-Nielsen, politician
- 22 March – Annika Langvad, cyclist

=== April–June ===
- 13 April – Anders Lindegaard, footballer
- 1 May – Mikkel Følsgaard, actor
- 17 May – Simon Mathew, pop singer

=== July–September ===
- 10 July – Pernille Skipper, politician
- 13 July – Esben Smed, actor
- 5 August – Kaare Dybvad, politician
- 23 September – Mark Madsen, martial artist and wrestler

=== October–December ===
- 27 October – Emilie Ullerup, actress
- 3 November – Christian Bakkerud, Danish racing driver (d. 2011)
- 2 December – Anna David, singer
- 12 December – Daniel Agger, football player

== Deaths ==
- 18 February – Flemming Lassen, designer (born 1902)
- 16 April – Simon Spies, businessman and billionaire (born 1921)
- 21 May – Carl Petersen, politician (born 1894)
- 22 December - Vilhelm Lauritzen, architect (born 1894)

== See also ==
- 1984 in Danish television
