= Abu Talb =

Egyptian-born militant (born 1954)

- محمد أبو طلب
- Born: June 27, 1954 (age 72); Port Said, Egypt
- Organization: Palestine Liberation Organization
- Known for: A series of bombings
- Penalty: Life imprisonment

Details
- Locations: Copenhagen and Amsterdam
- Killed: 1
- Injured: Over 20
- Weapon: Bombs

Mohammed Abu Talb (Arabic: محمد أبو طلب (alt. transliteration: Muhammad Abu Talib), born 27 June 1954) is an Egyptian-born militant who was convicted on 21 December 1989 of a series of bombings in Copenhagen and Amsterdam in 1985, and was sentenced to life imprisonment in Sweden. He has also been investigated in connection with the 21 December 1988 bombing of Pan Am Flight 103 (the Lockerbie disaster).

In October 2009, Abu Talb was reported to have been released from jail in Södertälje, Sweden, several weeks after Abdelbaset al-Megrahi (the man convicted of the Lockerbie bombing) was granted compassionate release from jail in Scotland to return to Libya.

== Background ==
Abu Talb was born in Port Said in Egypt. He was a soldier in the Egyptian Army and also received training in the Soviet Union. He joined the Palestine Liberation Organization (PLO) in 1970. He has asserted that he deserted from the Egyptian Army in the mid-1970s and thereafter fled to Lebanon via Jordan with a false passport. He joined the Palestinian Popular Struggle Front (PPSF) in 1974 and participated on its side during the early stages of the Lebanese Civil War. There, he rose to the rank of lieutenant, commanding a 100-member security detail. He also went to Beirut, where he was wounded in fighting in 1976 and spent the next two years studying politics and economics at the University of Beirut.

In 1986, Abu Talb arrived in Sweden from Syria with his wife and child on a false Moroccan passport, under the name of Belaid Massoud Ben Hadi, and was granted political asylum there. He settled in Uppsala and ran a store specializing in Arab foods and videotapes.

== 1985 bombings ==
On 21 December 1989, Abu Talb and three other men were convicted by a court in Uppsala for a series of bombings in Copenhagen and Amsterdam in 1985. In the 22 July 1985 Copenhagen bombings by Hezbollah, a bomb exploded outside the offices of Northwest Airlines in Copenhagen, killing an Algerian citizen and injuring over twenty people. A second bomb exploded at the Great Synagogue in Copenhagen, injuring seven people.

In addition to these bombs, the men were convicted for bombings of the Israeli airline El Al offices in Copenhagen and Amsterdam, which left no injuries. Abu Talb and Marten Imandi (a Syrian-born Palestinian man who had been granted Swedish citizenship) were sentenced by the court to life in prison (which in Sweden generally means 20 years at most) while the other two men – the brothers Mahmoud and Moustafa al-Mougrabi (who are Abu Talb's brothers-in-law), were sentenced to six years and one year in prison respectively for their involvement in the attacks.

Abu Talb maintained his innocence and said he had ended all terrorist activities in relation to Palestine at the end of 1982.

== Lockerbie bombing ==
In May 1989, Abu Talb was arrested in connection with the bombing of Pan Am Flight 103 on 21 December 1988, where 270 people were killed. He came under suspicion after Swedish investigators established that he had travelled to Malta in October 1988, two months before the bombing. British investigators earlier found that the bomb was hidden in a radio-cassette recorder, which was placed in a suitcase and wrapped in clothing bought in Malta. In Abu Talb's apartment in Uppsala, the police also found a 1988 calendar with the date "21 December" circled. In addition, Abu Talb's wife was recorded in a wiretapped telephone call warning another unidentified Palestinian to "get rid of the clothes immediately." Abu Talb's involvement in the bombing was also alleged in a 2002 report commissioned by lawyers for Abdelbaset al-Megrahi, the man convicted of the bombing. Abu Talb denied he was involved in the bombing and said his trip to Malta was for "business".

In a special defence at the Pan Am Flight 103 bombing trial, defence counsel alleged that the Syrian-backed Popular Front for the Liberation of Palestine-General Command (PFLP-GC) and the lesser known PPSF were responsible for blowing up Pan Am Flight 103. They called Abu Talb to give evidence at the trial since they alleged he was linked to both terrorist groups. Instead, Abu Talb appeared as a prosecution witness, and in his testimony in November 2000, he told the court that he was not involved in the December 1988 Lockerbie bombing. He said he had been at home babysitting in Sweden at the time of the bombing.

In June 2007, the Crown Office denied that Abu Talb had immunity and declared that he could still face prosecution for the Lockerbie bombing.
