= Nils Foss =

Danish civil engineer and business executive (1928–2018)

Nils Foss (11 May 1928 – 16 May 2018) was a Danish civil engineer and business executive. He was the founder of Foss A/S, a Danish family owned company, established in 1956. The Nils Foss Prize is named after him.

== Early life and education ==
Foss was born into a family of well-known civil engineers in Copenhagen. His paternal grandfather, Alexander Foss, had been a co-owner and central figure in FLSmidth from 1887. Foss attended Gentofte Statsskole and graduated as a civil engineer from the Technical University of Denmark in 1952.

== Career ==
After his graduation, Foss was initially employed at Torben Søderberg in Denmark as Sales engineer. Thereafter he went to the United States where he worked for Tracerlab in Boston and Donner Scientific Co. in California.

After his return to Denmark, in 1956, he founded FOSS Electric A/S (now FOSS Analytical A/S), with his father Erling Foss. He was CEO of FOSS until 1968, where after he was CEO of the Danish company F.L. Smidth from 1969–1976. In 1981 he returned to FOSS as CEO and in 1990 he passed the reins to his son Peter Foss.

For a period of time he was active in the Board of the Danish Conservative Party, during which time he was a strong supporter of Danish membership of the European Union.

During 1989–1996 Nils Foss was Chairman of the Danish charity Dansk Flygtningehjælp. He is also the co-founder and Chairman of the Danish American Business Forum (DABF) from 1997–2002; and Danish-Chinese Business Forum (DCBF) where he held the position of Chairman from 2006–2012.

== Personal life ==
Foss was married to the artist Dorthe Foss. They had three children, the sons Peter and Nils Christian Foss and the daughter Pernille Foss. All three children are board members of Foss Analytics. Foss was active in the Conservative People's Party. He was chairman of Dansk Flygtningehjælp from 1989 to 1996.
