= Frants Hvass =

Danish diplomat (1896–1982)

Frants Hvass (29 April 1896 - 21 December 1982) was a Danish diplomat.

== Early life and education ==
Hvass was born in Copenhagen, the son of barrister Anders Hvass (1858–1916) and Anna Augusta S. E. Hvass née Saxild (1864–1955). He graduated from Henrik Madsen's School in 1914 and completed his law studies (cand.jur.( at the University of Copenhagen in 1921.

== Career ==
In January 1922, Hvass became a secretary if the Ministry of Foreign Affairs. He served as minister secretary from 1925 to 1927 and was then appointed as vice consul in Hamburg. In 1930–33, he returned to the job as minister secretary. He then worked at the Danish embassy in London from 1933 to 1936. He then worked in the Ministry of Foreign Affairs for 12 years, from 1941 to 1945 as head of the political-legal department and in 1945–48 as director. In 1949, with title of Major-General, he was appointed as head of the Danish military mission in Berlin and the diplomatic mission in Rome. He served as Danish ambassador to Bonn in 1951–66.

== World War II ==
In June 1941, during the Occupation of Denmark, Hvass was tasked with assisting Minister of Foreign Affairs Erik Scavenius and director Nils Svenningsen in the negotiations with the Germans. He accompanied on his journeys to Berlin in 1941 and 1942. After 29 August 1943, he was involved in the work with trying to assist deported Danes in the prisons and concentration camps. In June 1944 he was part of the Red Cross delegation that visited Theresienstadt the infamous Nazi camp, helping to write a report on what the delegation had see. He played a central role in the establishment of the organisations that transported Danish, Norwegian and other prisoners to Denmark and Sweden in the spring of 1945.

== UN ==
He was Denmark's first delegate at the UN preliminary meeting in London in 1945 and a member of the Danish delegation in Paris and New Torl in 1948.

== Personal life ==
Hvass married Esther, Baroness Lerche (11 October 1909 ) on 17 September 1949. She was the only child of Wilhelm, Count Lerche (1857–1916) and Addie Catherine Juliane Grevenkop-Castenskjold (1878–1963). His wife owned Hagestedgaard at Holbæk from 1953,

== Awards ==
In 1972, he was appointed to honorary president of the International Institute of Administrative Sciences.
