= Renholdningsselskabet af 1898 =

Danish waste management company

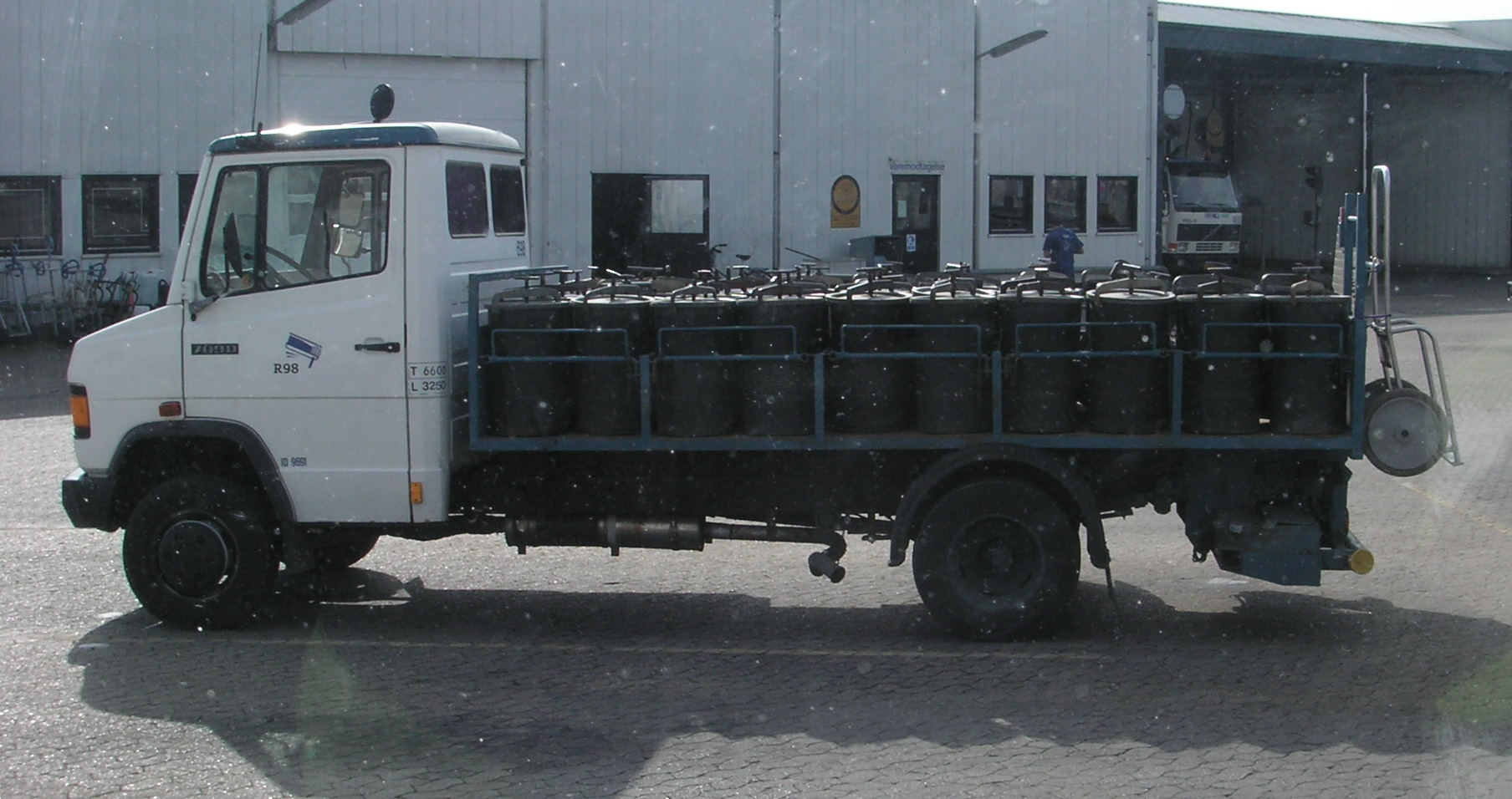
An R98 truck

Renholdningsselskabet af 1898 (Danish for "The Cleaning Company of 1898"), commonly known as R98, was a Danish company owned by Copenhagen and Frederiksberg municipalities. It served the people there by collecting waste (including garden waste, hazardous waste, clinical waste and bulky waste), recycling glass and paper, as well as other specialist waste services. R98 was a non-profit company and therefore did not make money on the handling of waste. It was dissolved in 2011.

== History ==
The company started in 1898 under the name Kjøbenhavns Grundejeres Renholdningsselskab, shortened to KGR. Then its task was to empty and wash latrine buckets, in the jargon called "removal of night soil". The buckets were carried to Amager, where they built a cleaning station. From this Amager got the unattractive nickname Lorteøen (the shit island).

In 1984 the container department Renoflex was eliminated from R98 because of problems with solutions for industrial waste and garbage collection outside the coverage.

In 2003 tenders were invited for the collection of garden refuse and bulky refuse in containers. This was due to (for instance) dissatisfaction from other haulage contractors because the task without supplies was carried out by Renoflex, and they thought this was unfair. This led to a splitting up of the contract into two districts (north and south) that as of 2006 are served by two separate companies.

In a 2005 case R98's 30-year contract with the municipalities for the collection of refuse was declared illegal. After this the planning of the call for tenders of this area started, and at the same time one agreed to that the service in the course of time was to be transferred to be a municipal task. Because of the size of the tasks, tenders were invited over a short period of years.

The company was eliminated as of 2011 and the necessary staff transferred to the two municipalities.
