= Sofie Madsen =

Danish teacher and school principal (1897–1982)

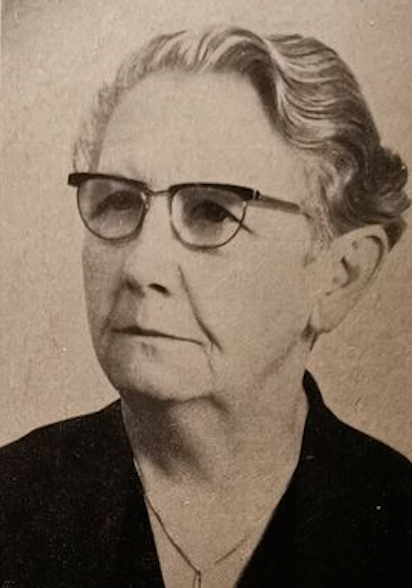
Sofie Madsen

Maren Sofie Madsen (30 December 1897, Meløse—9 February 1982, Roskilde) was a Danish teacher and school principal who is remembered for her pioneering work with autistic children. After succeeding in improving contact with a few children considered to be difficult, by the mid-1920s she was able to care for six children in a dedicated school building near Roskilde. In 1941, she acquired larger premises for what in 1947 was recognized as an independent institution known as Himmelev Bornehjem (Himmelev Children's Home). By 1967 when she turned 70, the school had provided an education for 300 children who were able to lead normal lives. In 1961, her efforts were recognized by the Landsforeningen for Mentalhygiejne (Mental Hygiene Association) who awarded her their Antonius Prize. In 1956, Madsen published Hvad børnene lærte mig (What the Children Taught Me) followed by two other works documenting her experiences.

== Early life and education ==
Born on 30 December 1897 in the little village of Meløse west of Hillerød, Maren Sofie Madsen was the daughter of the farm worker Jørgen Madsen (1855–1901) and his wife Mathildre Sofie née Meincke (1868–1939), who had worked as a milkmaid. When she was four her father died and, facing economic difficulties, her mother sent her to live with relatives in Jutland. She pined so much for her mother and siblings that she had to be sent home again but the experience had such an effect on her that she developed a condition approaching autism. In contrast to her siblings, she was unable to progress at school as she suffered from dyslexia although it was not understood at the time. As a result, she had to leave school in 1911. She worked at home as a seamstress until she was 19, then as a nanny in various homes, becoming increasingly interested in helping "difficult" children. After six months' training, she was able to work in orphanages but unhappy with the work, she later became a cook in a home in Hillerød. In 1920, she was helped to develop her interest in disadvantaged children as she learnt about the educative work of Maria Montessori.

== Career ==
In 1922, Madsen was hired by Thora Constantin-Hansen who had opened a small Montessori school in Himmelev near Roskilde. Initially she adapted willingly to the school but left after a year a she did not agree with the method of teaching. Instead she turned to gardening on the Aagaard estate where she felt more comfortable. From 1924, she began to care for a couple of autistic children, slowly attracting a few more until in 1926 she moved into Havrekilde, a small property attached to Rødkilde Højskole. She succeeded in promoting communication with the children by trying to activate their own interests without threats or coercion. For Madsen, it was more important for the children to attain quality in their lives rather than having them adapt to society.

Over the years her approach gained wider recognition. In 1928, with some 10 children in the building she employed her first helper. In 1933, additional funding allowed her to extend the building into an orphanage for 14 children, while in 1938 the authorities granted psychiatric supervision. In 1941 she acquired Højbo where children could be housed after their treatment had been completed. This became known as Himmelev Children's Home in 1947 which was later extended to include another building. By her 70th birthday in 1967, Madsen had cared for some 300 children. Many of those who had been deemed intellectually disabled or insane were able to lead normal lives. In 1961, her efforts were recognized by the Landsforeningen for Mentalhygiejne (Mental Hygiene Association) who awarded her their Antonius Prize. In 1956, Madsen published Hvad børnene lærte mig (What the Children Taught Me) followed by two other works documenting her experiences.

Inspired by Madsen's approach, with her assistance Else Hansen established her Sofieskolen (Sofie School) in 1964 in Bagsværd. Initially caring for 12 children, by 1968 it had grown into a special school for 37 children and today provides facilities for some 60 children.

Sofie Madsen died on 9 February 1982 and was buried in Lille Lyngby.
