= Great Synagogue (Copenhagen) =

Orthodox synagogue in Copenhagen, Denmark

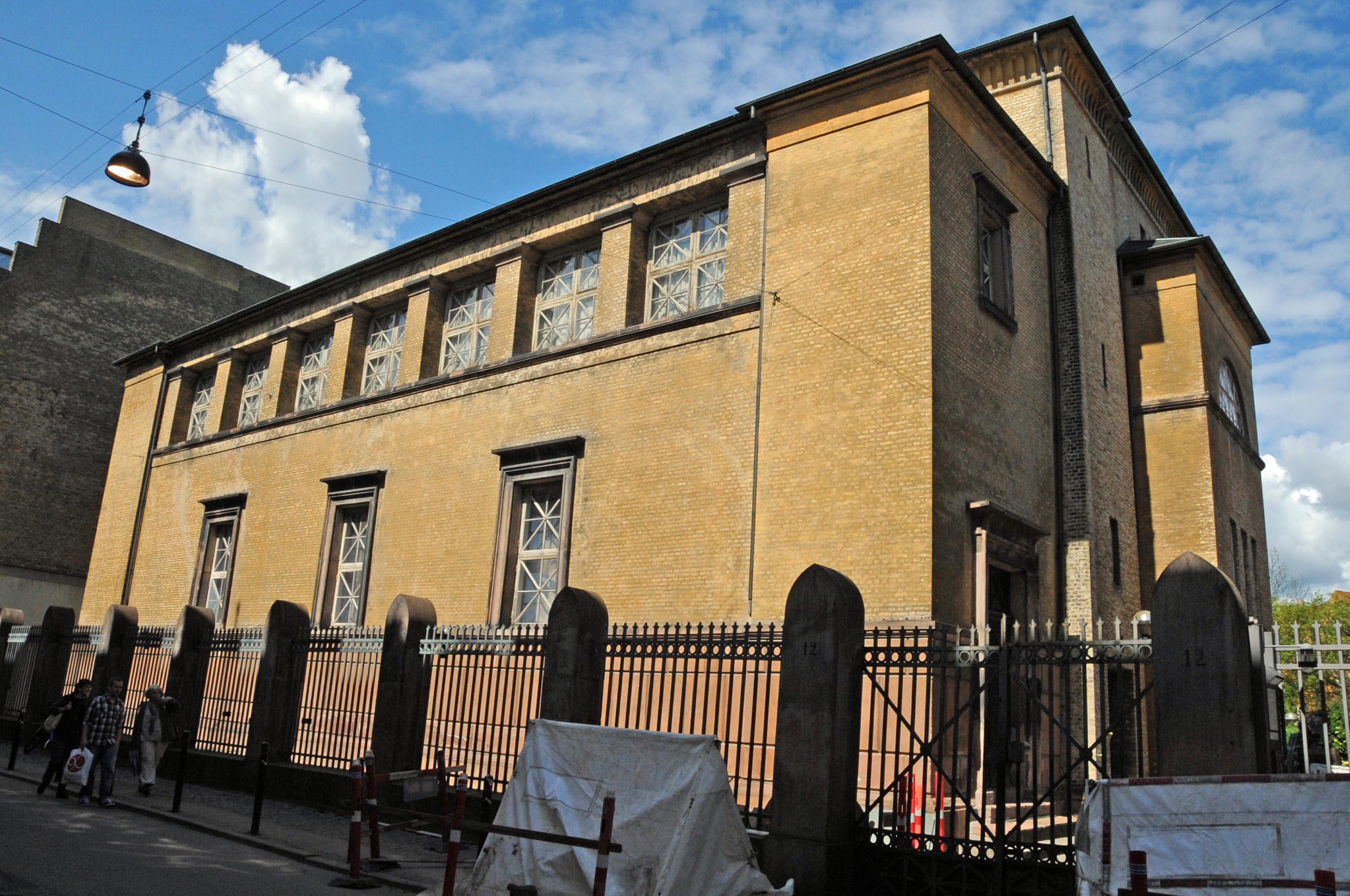
- The Great Synagogue in 2009

- Location of the synagogue in Copenhagen

Religion
- Affiliation: Orthodox Judaism
- Rite: Nusach Ashkenaz

Location
- Location: Krystalgade 12, Copenhagen
- Country: Denmark
- Interactive map of Great Synagogue
- Coordinates: 55°40′52″N 12°34′24″E

Architecture
- Architect: Gustav Friedrich Hetsch
- Type: Synagogue architecture
- Style: Neoclassical; Egyptian Revival
- Established: 17th century (as a congregation)
- Completed: 1833

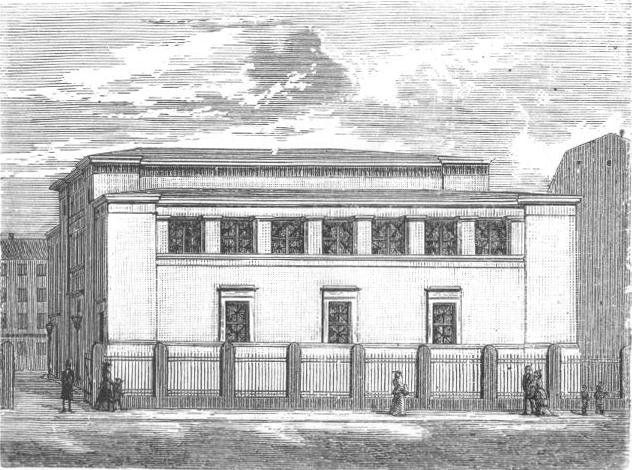
Illustration of the Great Synagogue from around 1899

The Great Synagogue is an Orthodox Jewish congregation and synagogue, located at Krystalgade 12, in Copenhagen, Denmark. The congregation was formed at some stage during the 17th century and their first synagogue completed in 1766. The current synagogue was completed in 1833 and is defined by its unique architecture around the Ark. During the first half of the 19th century, synagogues continued to be built in the classical tradition, but there began to be a revival of Greek and Roman architecture. The Great Synagogue in Copenhagen is one of a few synagogues of its period to use Egyptian elements in the columns, ceiling and cornice over the ark.

== History ==
=== Arrival of Jews into Denmark ===
Jews arrived into Denmark from 1622 when they were invited into the country by Denmark's king. Although they were scattered around, many of the Jews settled in Copenhagen. Abraham Salomon became the first rabbi in the country in 1687. From 1766 until 1795, around 1,500 Jews worshipped in a small synagogue until it burned down. After the synagogue burned down, a division occurred between the Orthodox and Progressive members of the Jewish community. As a result, the building of a new synagogue was halted and many members resorted to worshipping in various homes. This division lasted for about 30 years until it was extinguished. The building of the Great Synagogue occurred after this. In 1814, Jews who were living in Denmark were given the same rights as other citizens as a result of the Royal Decree.

=== Architecture ===
Construction of the Great Synagogue was completed in 1833. It was designed by Danish architect Gustav Friedrich Hetsch. The synagogue was designed with the Neoclassical style in mind, which is demonstrated through the building's simplistic design. The interior of the building, however, has designs that are from the Egyptian Revival style. This style works to help give the synagogue a more Eastern European feel rather than the traditional Northern European feel.

=== World War II ===
During World War II, the Torah scrolls of the synagogue were hidden at the Trinitatis Church and were returned to the synagogue after the war.

=== Terrorist attacks ===
==== 1985 ====
On 22 July 1985, the synagogue was struck by a bomb placed by Palestinian terrorists. While no people were injured in the attack on the synagogue, a second bomb placed by the same group destroyed the Copenhagen offices of the American Northwest Orient Airlines, killing one person and injuring 26. 4 individuals with links to Palestinian nationalist organizations, including Mohammed Abu Talb, were later convicted for these and several other terrorist attacks.

==== 2015 ====
A shooting occurred outside the synagogue on 15 February 2015, killing a Jewish community member, who had been providing security, and wounding two Danish Security and Intelligence Service police officers who were shot in the arms and legs. The shooting occurred a few hours after another shooting at a café in Østerbro. Swedish artist Lars Vilks is believed to be the main target of the café shooting. At the time of the shooting, a discussion was being held about cartoon portrayals of the Islamic prophet Muhammad. Vilks has received death threats in the past for his cartoon portrayals of the prophet.

== See also ==
- History of the Jews in Denmark
