= 1981 in Denmark =

- Decades: 1960s; 1970s; 1980s; 1990s; 2000s
- See also: Other events of 1981; List of years in Denmark

Events from the year 1981 in Denmark.

== Incumbents ==
- Monarch – Margrethe II
- Prime minister – Anker Jørgensen

== Events ==
- 8 December – The 1981 Danish parliamentary election is held.

== Sports ==
=== Badminton ===
- Gentofte BK wins Europe Cup.

=== Cycling ===
- Albert Fritz (FRG) and Patrick Sercu (BEL) win the Six Days of Copenhagen six-day track cycling race.

== Births ==
=== January–March ===
- 9 February – Kristian Pless, tennis player
- 5 March – Helle Frederiksen, triathlete
- 31 March – Mattias Tesfaye, politician

=== April–June ===
- 30 May – Lars Møller Madsen, handball player
- 9 June – Kasper Søndergaard, handball player

=== July–September ===
- 1 August – Hans Lindberg, handball player
- 1 September – Michael Maze, table tennis player
- 6 September – Søren Larsen, footballer

=== October–December ===
- 6 October – Thomas Troelsen, music producer
- 28 October – Elvira Lind, film director
- 24 November – Mads Rasmussen, rower
- 4 December – Brian Vandborg, cyclist

== Deaths ==
=== January–March ===
- 17 February – Ellen Gottschalch, actress (born 1894)
- 27 March – Preben Kaas (born 1930)

=== July–September ===
- 4 July – Niels Erik Nørlund, mathematician (died 1885)
- 30 September – Flemming Weis, composer (born 1909)

=== October–December ===
- 21 November – Ejner Federspiel, actor (born 1896)
- 28 November – Arthur Jensen, actor (born 1897)
- 20 November – Knud Ejler Løgstrup, philosopher (died 1905)
- 4 December – Ole Sarvig, poet (born 1921)

== See also ==
- 1981 in Danish television
