= Carl Adolph Feilberg (1810–1896) =

Danish businessman

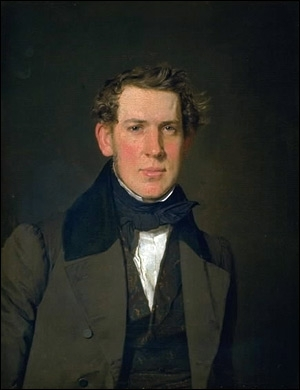
- Feilberg painted by Christen Købke
- Born: 20 August 1810; Copenhagen, Denmark
- Died: 8 January 1896 (aged 85); Frederiksberg, Denmark
- Occupation: Businessman

Carl Adolph Feilberg (20 August 1810 – 8 January 1896) was a Danish businessman. He founded Falkonergårdens Fabrikker on the Falkonergården estate in Frederiksberg in 1842.

== Early life and education ==
Feilberg was born on 20 August 1810 in Copenhagen, the son of Henning Frederik Feilberg and Louise Brummer. His father was a factory owner, investor and businessman and who served as chief of plans for the Bank of Denmark. He studied engineering (Cand. Polyt.) at the College of Advanced Technology.

== Career ==
Feilberg bought Falkonergården, a former royal falconry. He established a soap and wax candle factory under the name Falkonergårdens Fabrikker at the site in 1842.

== Personal life ==
Feilberg married Albertine Hagen. The couple had no children.

His brother, Nicolai Laurentius Feilberg, a priest, was the brother-in-law of the painter Christen Købke. Købke painted his portrait and painted his last nature studies on the Falkonérgården estate.

He was the paternal uncle to the Australian journalist, newspaper editor and Indigenous rights activist Carl Adolph Feilberg, the Danish priest and folklorist Henning Frederik Feilberg, the planter and photographer Kristen Feilberg, and the journalist and restaurateur Frederik Laurentius Feilberg (1858-1917), aka "Lorry" Feilberg.

Feilberg died on 8 January 1896. He is buried in Frederiksberg Old Cemetery.
