= 1863 in Denmark =

- Decades: 1840s; 1850s; 1860s; 1870s; 1880s
- See also: Other events of 1863; List of years in Denmark

Events from the year 1863 in Denmark.

== Incumbents ==
- Monarch – Frederick VII (until 15 November), Christian IX
- Prime minister – Carl Christian Hall (until 31 December), Ditlev Gothard Monrad

== Events ==
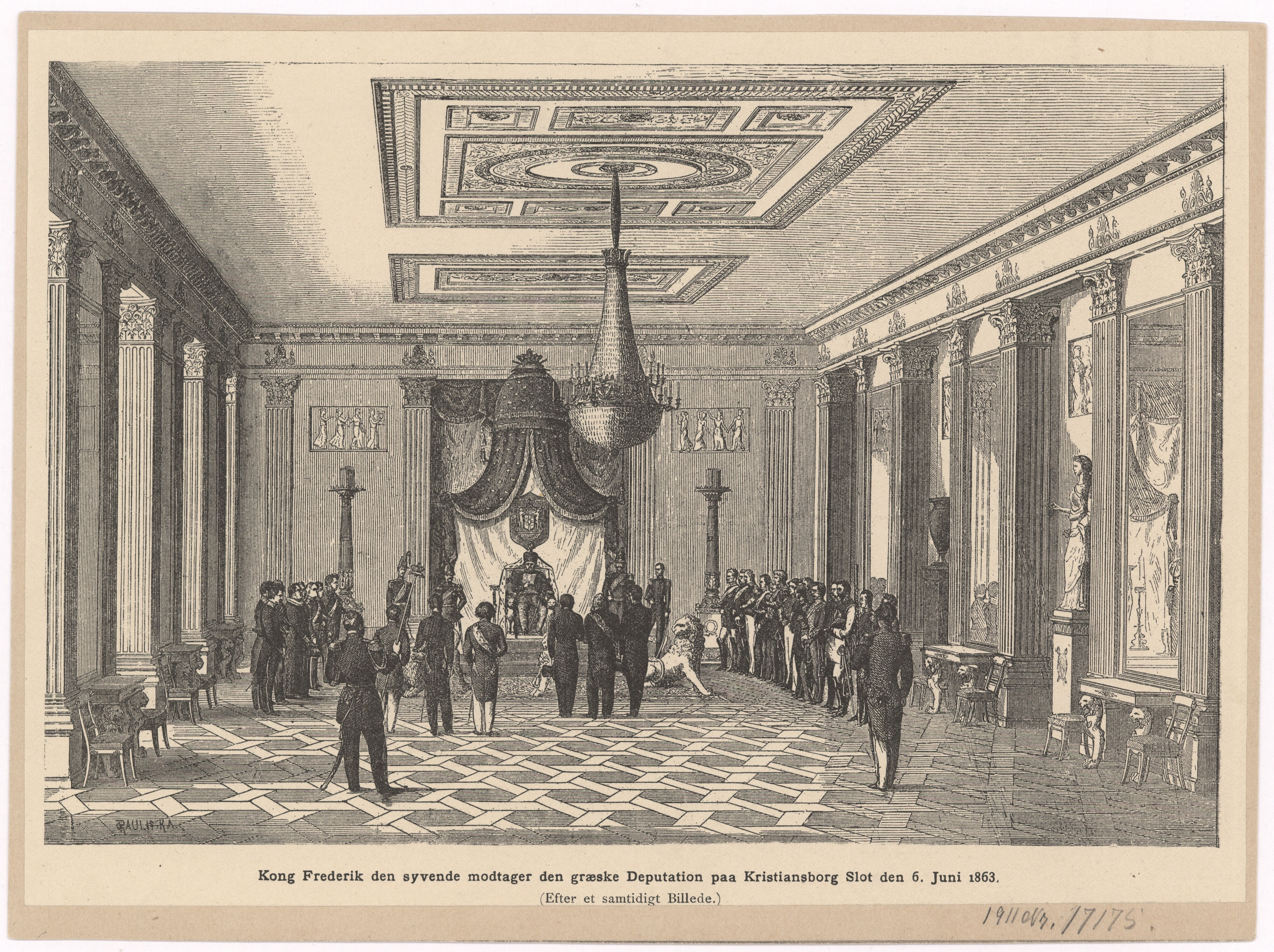
Frederick VII receives a Greek deputation at Christiansborg.

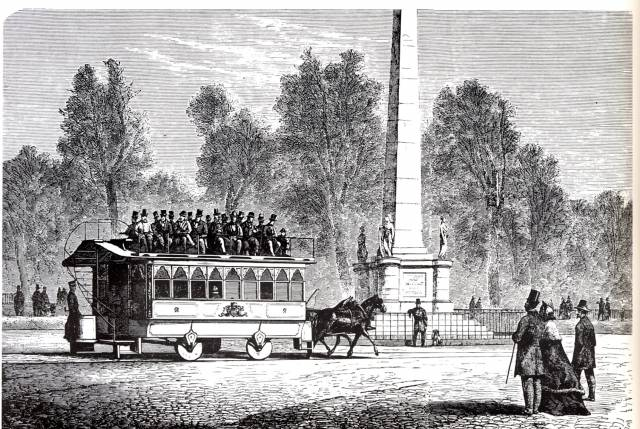
The first tram in Copenhagen passing the Liberty Column

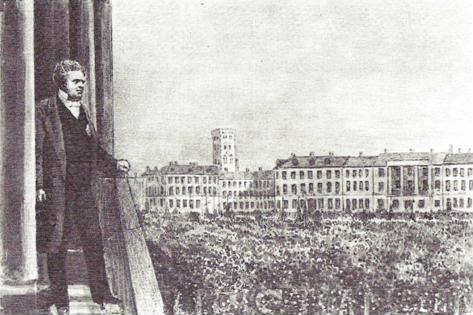
C. C. Hall proclaiming Frederick VII's death and Christian IX's ascent to the throne from Christiansborg Palace

- 6 May – HDMS Rolf Krake is launched at Nyholm in Copenhagen.
- 6 June – Frederick VII receives a Greek deputation at Christiansborg.
- 20 July – The LangåLangå-Viborg section of the Langå-Struer Railway is opened..
- 22 October – The first tramway in Copenhagen begins operations. The Horse-drawn tram cars run along a single track between Sankt Annæ Plads and Frederiksberg Runddel.
- 15 November – With Christian IX's accent to the Danish throne, the House of Glücksburg succeeded the House of Oldenburg.
- Christian IX signs the so-called November Constitution establishing a shared law of succession and a common parliament for both Schleswig and Denmark. This is seen by the German Confederation as a violation of the 1852 London Protocol.
- 24 December – Saxon and Hanoverian troops marched into Holstein on behalf of the Confederation. Supported by the German soldiers and by loyal Holsteiners, Frederick VIII, Duke of Schleswig-Holstein took control of the government of Holstein.

== Births ==
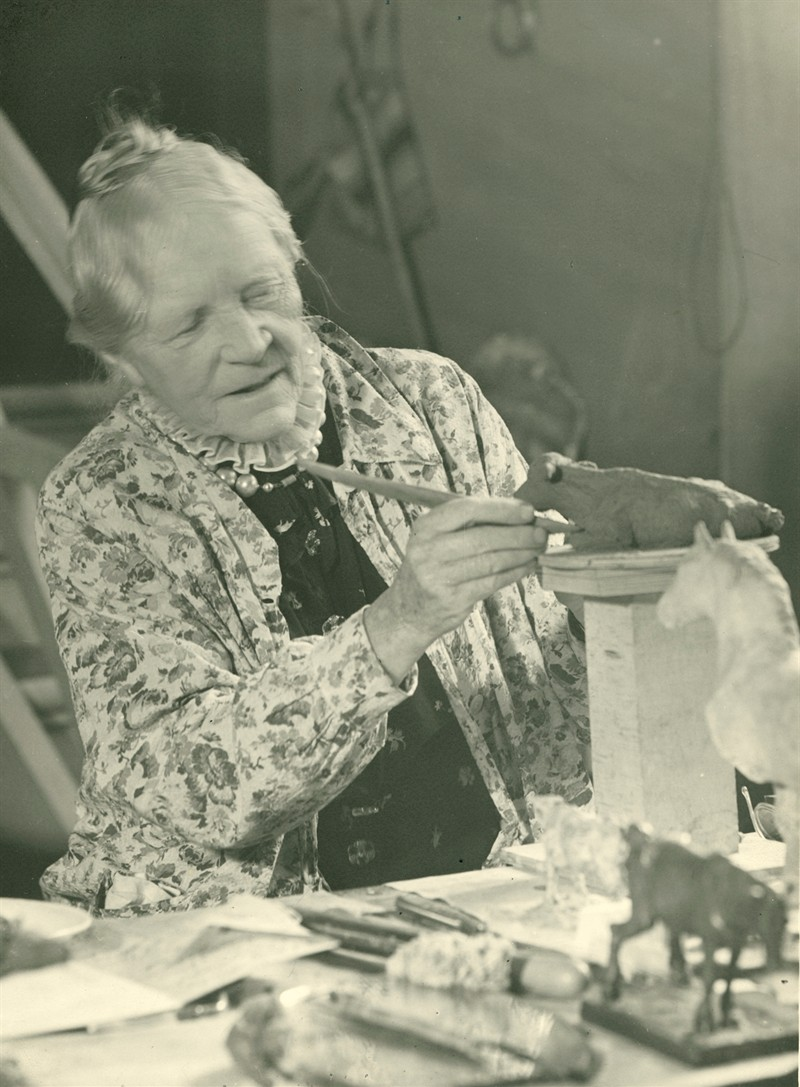
Anne Marie Carl-Nielsen-

=== January–March ===
- 12 March – Carl Holsøe, painter (died 1935)
- 26 March – Edvard Ehlers, dermatologist (died 1937)

=== April–June ===
- 22 April – Karl Hansen Reistrup, sculptor, illustrator and ceramist. (died 1929)

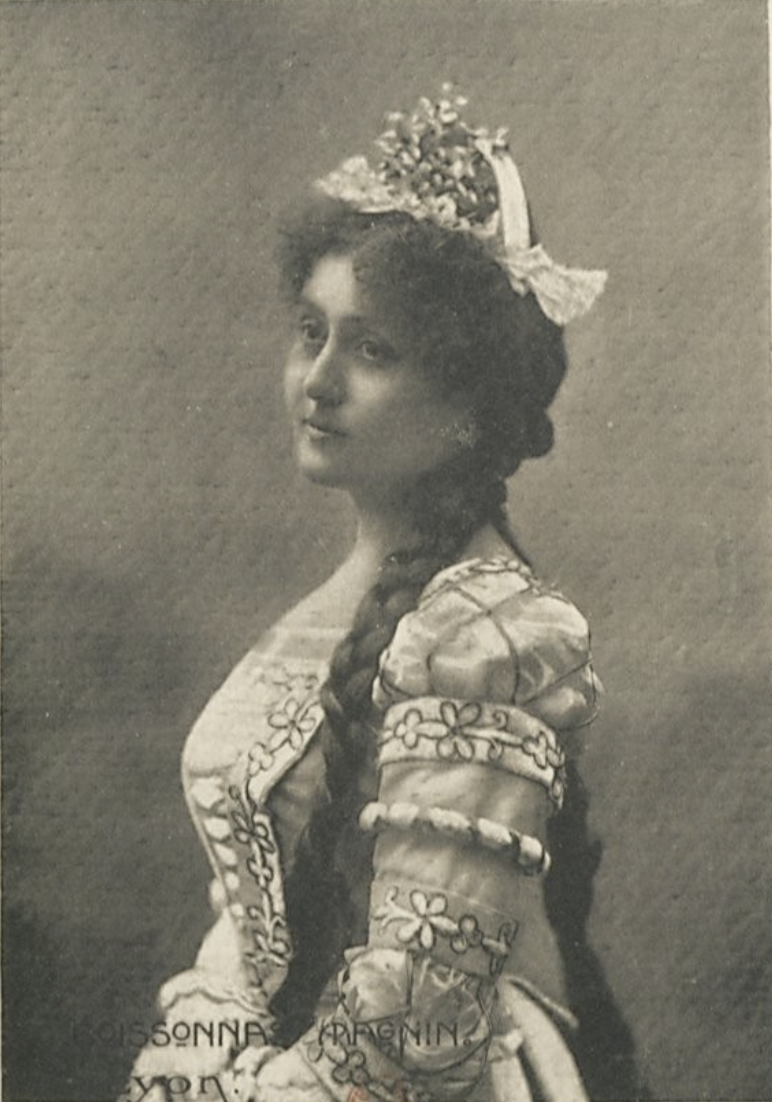
Louise Jensen.

- 25 April – Carl Wentorf, painter (died 1914)
- 5 May – Ole Olsen, filmmaker and Nordisk Film-founder (died 1943)
- 10 June – C. M. T. Cold, naval officer and politician (died 1904)
- 21 June – Anne Marie Carl-Nielsen, sculptor (died 1945)
- 25 June – Frederik Jensen, stage and film actor (died 1934)

=== July–September ===
- 5 July – Anton Carl Illum, businessman (died 1938)
- 7 July – Dagmar Orlamundt, actress (died 1939)
- 1 September – Aage Giødesen, painter (died 1939)
- 7 September – Jens Ferdinand Willumsen, painter (died 1958)
- 17 September – Viggo Stuckenberg, poet (died 1905)

=== October–December ===
- 5 October – Louise Janssen, operatic soprano (died 1938 in France)
- 11 October – Ingeborg Raunkiær, author (died 1921)
- 1 November – Carl Hentzen, engineer (died 1937)
- 21 November – Emma Thomsen, actress (died 1919)
- 8 December – Frederik Riise, photographer (died 199)

== Deaths ==
- 2 May – Hans Ditmar Frederik Feddersen, civil servant and politician (died 1805)
- 13 May – Ferdinand Thielemann. architect (born 1803)
- 29 June – Ferdinand, Hereditary Prince of Denmark (born 1792)
- 12 October – William Frederik Duntzfelt, businessman (born 1792)
- 15 November – Frederick VII, king of Denmark (born 1808)
