= 1920 in Denmark =

- Decades: 1900s; 1910s; 1920s; 1930s; 1940s
- See also: Other events of 1920; List of years in Denmark

Events from the year 1920 in Denmark.

== Incumbents ==
- Monarch – Christian X
- Prime minister – Carl Theodor Zahle (until 30 March), Otto Liebe (until 5 April), Michael Pedersen Friis (until 5 May), Niels Neergaard

== Events ==
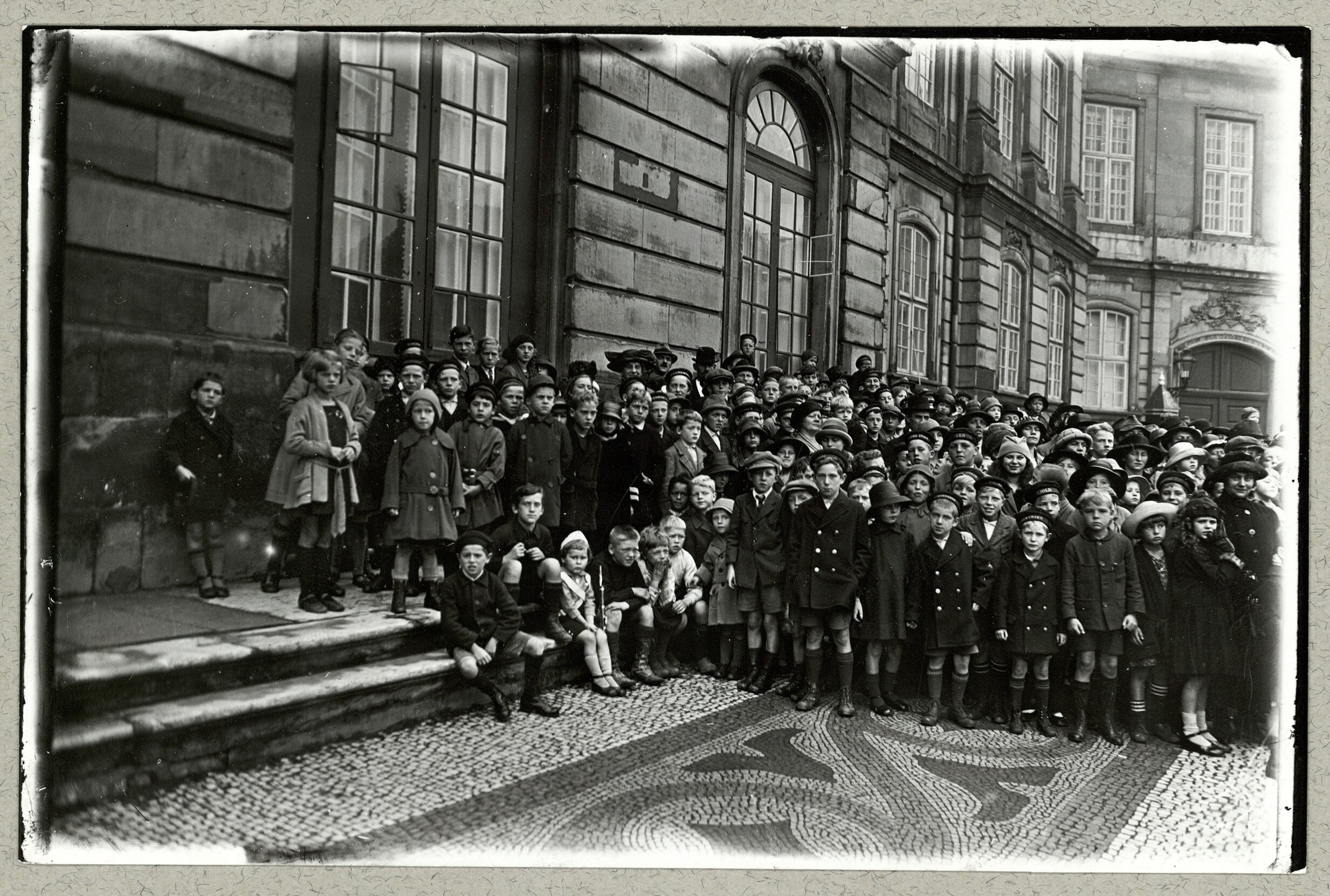
Christian X's 50th birthday celebrations photographed by Holger Damgaard.

- 29 March – Christian X dismisses the elected government, a reserve power he had under the Danish Constitution, giving rise to the constitutional crisis known as the Easter Crisis.
- 4 April – The Easter Crisis ends with Christian X's dismissal of the Cabinet of Liebe.
- 26 September – The 50th birthday of Christian X is celebrated.

== Sports ==
=== Date unknown ===
- B 1903 wins its first Danish football championship by defeating B 1901 2–0 in the final of the 1919–20 Danish National Football Tournament.

== Births ==
=== January–March ===
- 31 January – Albert Mertz, painter (died 1990)
- 26 February – Hilmar Baunsgaard, politician, former Danish prime minister (died 1989)

=== April–June ===
- 16 April – Prince Georg of Denmark (died 1986)
- 14 May – Knud Lundberg, football player (died 2002)
- 22 May – Jorgen Thalbitzer pilot (died 1943)
- 18 June – Grete Jalk, furniture designer (died 2006)

=== July–September ===
- 8 July – Godtfred Kirk Christiansen, businessman (died 1995)
- 28 August – Keld Helmer-Petersen, photographer (died 2013)

=== October–December ===
- 6 November – Dagmar Andreasen, businesswoman (died 2006)
- 13 November – Inge Krogh, politician (died 2023)
- 6 December – Mette Koefoed Bjørnsen, author, conciliator and economist (died 2008)
- 10 December – Ragnhild Hveger, swimmer (died 2011)

== Deaths ==
=== January–March ===
- 6 January – Hieronymus Georg Zeuthen , mathematician (born 1839)
- 3 March – Theodor Philipsen, painter (born 1840)
- 7 March – Sophus Christopher Hauberg, industrialist (born 1848)
- 14 March – Christian Blache, painter (born 1839)
- 23 March – Ivar Knudsen, engineer (born 1861)

=== April–June ===
- 15 April – Hans Peter Johan Lyngbye (born 1834)
- 27 June – Hack Kampmann, architect (born 1856)
