= 1919 in Denmark =

- Decades: 1890s; 1900s; 1910s; 1920s; 1930s
- See also: Other events of 1919; List of years in Denmark

Events from the year 1919 in Denmark.

== Incumbents ==
- Monarch - Christian X
- Prime minister - Carl Theodor Zahle

== Events ==
- 1 October – Retsplejeloven enters into force, implementing a major reform of the Danish judicial system originally adopted on 11 April 1916.
- 1 November – Vigerslev train crash takes place in the Valby district of Copenhagen.

== The arts ==
=== Music ===
- 15 November – Premiere of Hakon Børresen's opera Den Kongelige Gæst at the Royal Danish Theatre.

== Sports ==
- 15 May – Brønshøj Boldklub is founded.

=== Date unknown ===
- AB wins its first Danish football championship by defeating Boldklubben 1901 3–0 in the final of the 1918–19 Danish National Football Tournament.

== Births ==
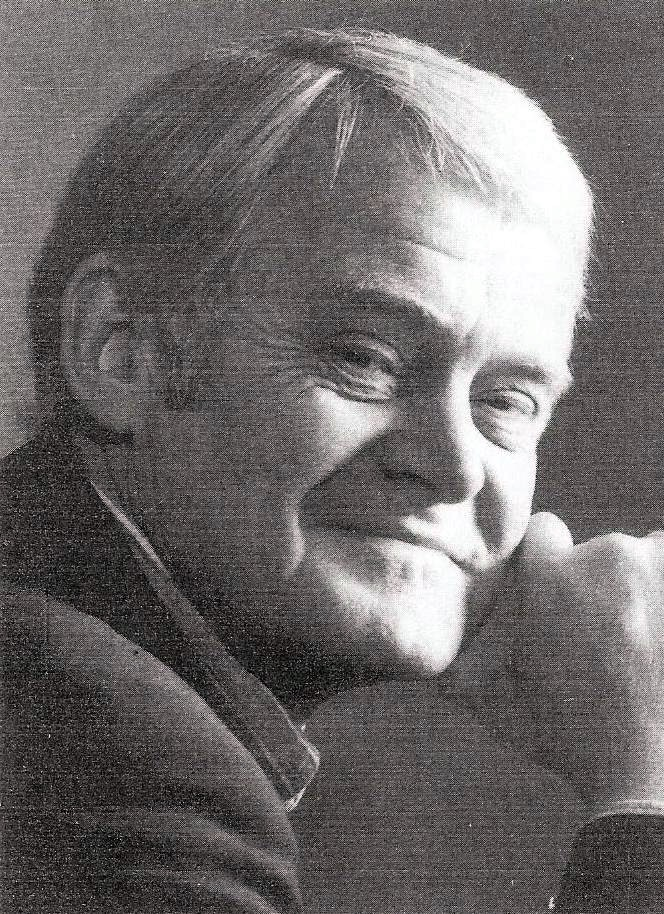
Ove Sprogøe.

=== January–March ===
- 17 January – Elsa Gress, author (died 1988)

=== April–June ===
- 10 June – Jane Muus, painter and illustrator (died 2007)

=== July–September ===
- 14 July – Gunnar Aagaard Andersen, artist and designer (died 1982)
- 24 August – Niels Viggo Bentzon, composer (died 2000)
- 20 September – Bjørn Wiinblad, ceramist and painter (died 2006)

=== October–December ===
- 13 October – Poul Møller, politician (died 1997)
- 7 December – Lis Løwert, actress (died 2009)
- 21 December – Ove Sprogøe, actor (died 2004)

== Deaths ==
- 15 January – Emma Thomsen, actress (born 1893)
- 21 May – Clemens Petersen, writer (born 1834)
- 6 January – Eline Hansen, feminist (born 1859)
- 28 January – Charles Brun, politician (born 1866)
- 15 July – Charles Ambt, engineer (born 1847)
