= 2008 in Denmark =

- Decades: 1980s; 1990s; 2000s; 2010s; 2020s
- See also: Other events of 2008; List of years in Denmark

The following lists events that happened during 2008 in Denmark.

== Incumbents ==
- Monarch – Margrethe II
- Prime minister – Anders Fogh Rasmussen

== Events ==
=== February ===
- 16 February – The Royal Playhouse on Copenhagen's waterfront is inaugurated with the play Hamlet, featuring Nicolas Bro in the title role.

=== May ===
- 1 May – Han Kjøbenhavn is founded.
- 24 May – Prince Joachim marries Marie Cavallier in Møgeltønder.

=== June ===
- 2 June – A suicide bomber strikes outside the Danish embassy in the Pakistani capital Islamabad with at least eight people dead.
- 4 June – al-Qaeda claims responsibility for the 2008 Danish embassy bombing stating it was revenge for the Jyllands-Posten Muhammad cartoons controversy.

=== October ===
- Realfiction company is founded in Copenhagen.

=== Date unknown ===
- The 25 øre coin is demonetised as the lowest-denomination coin in the country. It has been in circulation since 1874, when it was introduced on the decimalisation of the krone.

== The arts ==
=== Architecture ===
- 27 June – Lundgaard & Tranberg's Royal Playhouse in Copenhagen wins a 2008 RIBA European Award at the Royal Institute of British Architects' annual awards ceremony in London.
- 23 October – Schmidt hammer lassen's Performers House in Silkeborg wins the Grand Prix at the 5th LEAF Awards in London.

=== Film ===
- September – Per Fly's film Manslaughter wins the 2005 Nordic Council Film Prize.

=== Media ===
- 8 February – Erik Refner from Berlingske Tidende wins 1st prize in the Sports Features Stories category in the 51st World Press Photo Contest for a photo series of exhausted runners in Copenhagen Marathon.

=== Music ===
- 19 November – MGP Nordic 2008 is held in Århus.

== Sport ==
- 8–24 August – Denmark participates at the Summer Olympics in Beijing, China: two gold medals, two silver medals, two bronze medals.

=== Badminton ===
- 20 January – Tine Baun wins gold in women's single at the 2008 Malaysia Super Series.
- 9 March – Tine Rasmussen wins gold in women's singles at the All England Open badminton tournament.
- 16–20 April – The 21st European Badminton Championships are arranged in Herning, Denmark. With three gold medals, three silver medals and two bronze medals, Denmark finishes as the best nation.
- 26 October – Peter Gade wins gold in men's single at the 2008 Denmark Super Series.
- 2 November – Peter Gade wins gold in men's single at the 2008 French Super Series.

=== Cycling ===
- 5 February – Franco Marvulli (SUI) and Bruno Risi (SUI) win the Six Days of Copenhagen six-day track cycling race.

=== Football ===
- 1 May – Brøndby IF wins the 2007–08 Danish Cup by defeating Esbjerg fB 3–2 in the final.
- 6 September – Denmark draws 0–0 in an away game against Hungary in Group 1 of the 2010 FIFA World Cup qualification.
- 10 September – Denmark defeats Portugal 3–2 in Lisbon in the second round of World Cup qualification.
- 11 October – Denmark defeats Malta 3–0 at Parken Stadium, Copenhagen, in the third round of qualification.

=== Handball ===
- 27 January – Denmark wins the 2008 European Men's Handball Championship, arranged in Norway, after defeating Croatia in the final.

=== Motorsports ===
- 19 July – Denmark wins the 2008 Speedway World Cup final in Vojens, Denmark.
- 18 October – Nicki Pedersen becomes world champion in speedway by winning the 2008 Speedway Grand Prix series.

=== Other ===
- 13–24 March — Lotte Friis wins a bronze medal in 1,500 m freestyle at the 2008 European Aquatics Championships.
- 8 June – Matti Breschel wins the Philadelphia International Championship in cycle racing.
- 15 June – Tom Kristensen wins Le Mans for the 8th time when he wins the 2008 24 Hours of Le Mans with Audi Sport North America.
- 29 September – Matti Breschel wins bronze in men's road race at the 2008 UCI Road World Championships in Italy.
- 2 November – Søren Kjeldsen wins the 21st and final Volvo Masters at Valderrama Golf Club in Andalucia at eight under par.

== Births ==
- 28 March – Jacob Ambæk, footballer
- 29 June – Prince Aristidis-Stavros of Greece and Denmark, youngest child of Pavlos, Crown Prince of Greece, and Marie-Chantal, Crown Princess of Greece

== Deaths ==
- 16 January – Otto Steen Due, classical philologist (born 1939)
- 10 February – Inga Nielsen, opera singer (born 1946)
- 26 February – Bodil Udsen, actress (born 1925)
- 28 February – Ove Guldberg, politician (born 1918)
- 29 February – Erik Ortvad, painter and illustrator (born 1917)
- 27 March – Hans Chr. Ægidius, actor, writer and filmmaker (born 1933)
- 29 March – Mette Koefoed Bjørnsen, author, conciliator and economist (died 1920)
- 29 April – Claus Nissen, actor (born 1938)
- 11 May – Ole Fritsen, footballer (born 1941)
- 21 May – Ernst Meyer, actor (born 1932)
- 1 July – Mogens Glistrup, politician (born 1926)
- 5 July – Thomas Winding, author, radiohost and television producer
- 10 July – Jakob Ejersbo, journalist and author (born 1968)
- 16 August – Otto Leisner, television presenter (born 1917)
- 11 September – Preben Møller Hansen, writer, cook, politician, and trade unionist (born 1929)
- 20 September – Kamilla Bech Holten, television presenter and actress (born 1972)
- 1 November – Eric Danielsen, news anchor (born 1920)
- 16 November – Hilmer Hassig, musician (born 1960)
- 28 November – Jørn Utzon, architect (born 1918)

== See also ==
- 2008 in Danish television
