= 1921 in Denmark =

- Decades: 1900s; 1910s; 1920s; 1930s; 1940s
- See also: Other events of 1921; List of years in Denmark

Events from the year 1921 in Denmark.

== Incumbents ==
- Monarch – Christian X
- Prime minister – Niels Neergaard

== Events ==
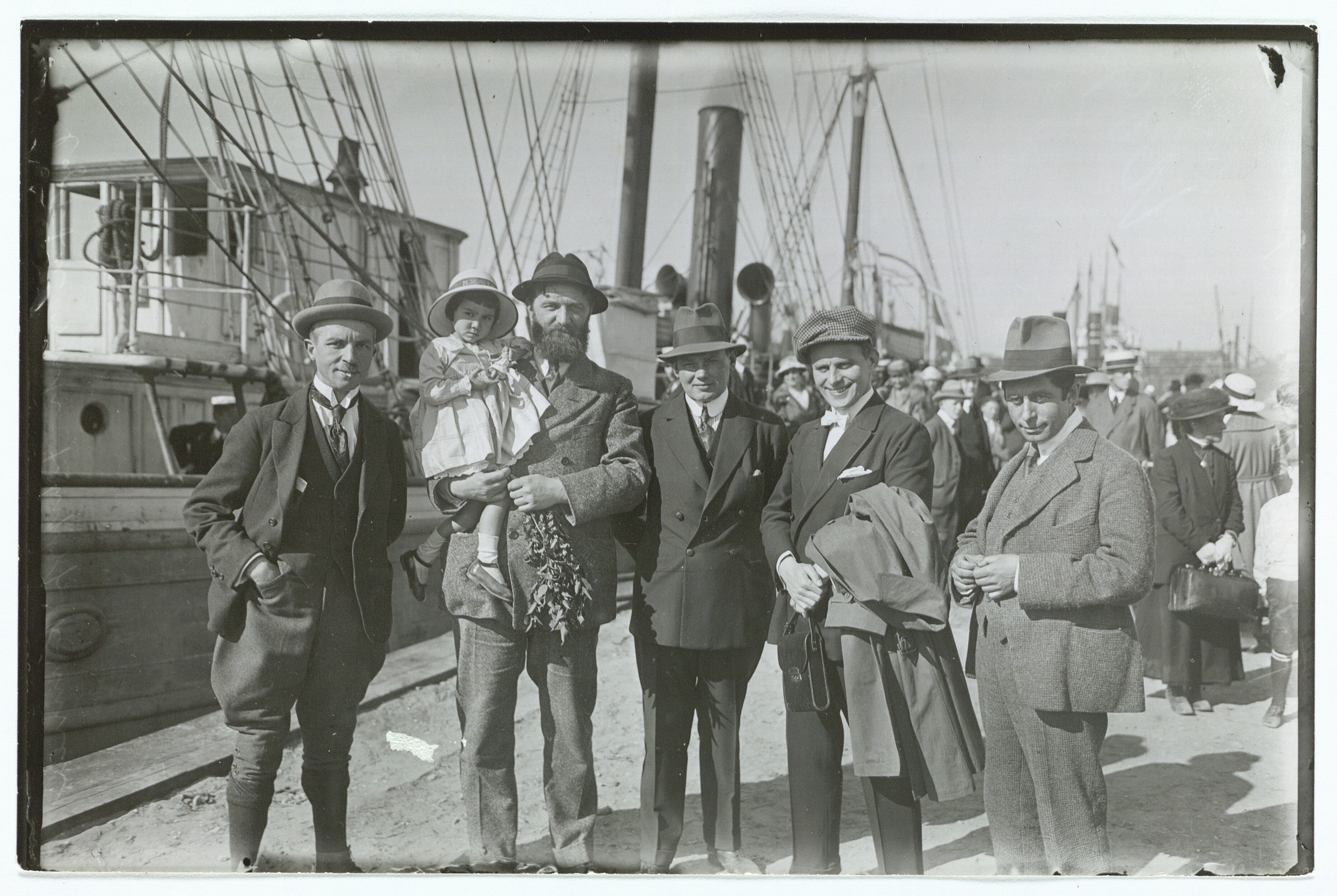
The departure of the 5yj Thule Expedition.

- May – The departure of the 5yh Thule Expedition.

== Sports ==
- 30 March – Lyngby Boldklub is founded.
- 21 August – Gentofte-Vangede Idrætsforening is founded.

=== Cycling ===
- 30 July – 8 August – The 1921 UCI Track Cycling World Championships are held in Copenhagen.
  - Henry Brask Andersen wins gold, Erik Kjeldsen wins silver and Johan Normann wins bronze in men's sprint at the Amateur event.
- 4 August – The 1921 UCI Road World Championships are held in Copenhagen
  - Willum Nielsen wins silver in Men's amateur road race.

=== Football ===
- AB wins its second Danish football championship by defeating Aarhus Gymnastikforening 3–0 in the final of the 1920–21 Danish National Football Tournament.

== Births ==
=== January–March ===
- 14 March – Lis Hartel, equestrian athlete (died 2009)
- 16 March – Jens Bjerre, Danish author, filmmaker and explorer (died 2020)

=== April–June ===
- 21 April – Halfdan T. Mahler, physician (died 2016 in Switzerland)
- 28 May – Kay Werner Nielsen, cyclist (died 2014)
- 29 May – Karen Hoff, canoeist (died 2000)
- 11 June – Ib Spang Olsen, artist and illustrator (died 2012)

=== July–September ===
- 1 September – Simon Spies, businessman, billionaire (died 1984)

=== October–December ===
- 21 November – Margrethe Schanne, ballerina (died 2014)
- 27 November – Ole Sarvig, poet (died 1991)

== Deaths ==
=== January–March ===
- 2 February – Antonio Jacobsen, painter (born 1850)
- 12 February – Troels Frederik Lund, historian (born 1840)

=== April–June ===
- 22 April – Vibeke Salicath, publisher (died 1861)
- 26 April – Cornelia von Levetzow, writer (born 1836)
- 18 May – Martin Nyrop, architect (born 1849)

=== July–September ===
- 8 September – Ingeborg Raunkiær, author (born 1863)
- 21 September – Edouard Suenson, business executive (born 1842)

=== October–December ===
- 8 October
  - Henning Frederik Feilberg, pastor, author and folklorist (born 1831)
  - Emma Eleonore Meyer, painter (born 1859)
