= Illum =

Department store in Copenhagen, Denmark

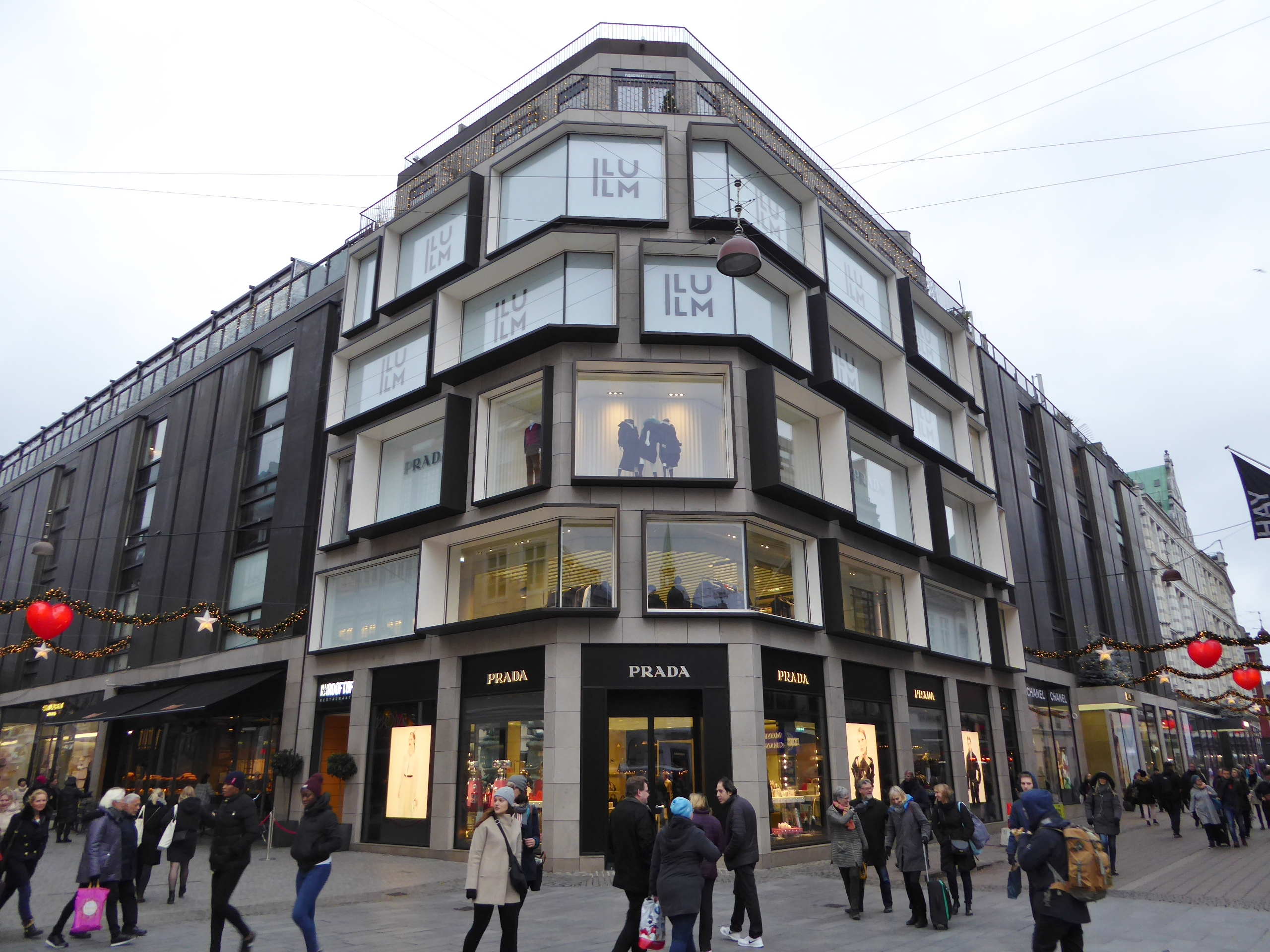
Illum store exterior

ILLUM is a department store located at Amagertorv on Strøget in Copenhagen, Denmark.

== History ==
ILLUM's history began in 1891, when wholesaler Anton Carl Illum opened a store specializing in sewing items and dress accessories in Østergade across from ILLUM's current location. The target group was the city's fine ladies. The business grew over the years and in 1899 moved to its current location. After Illum's death in 1938, the company was inherited by his son Svend Illum.

In 1959, Illum took over an exclusive furniture store, which changed its name to Illums Bolighus, which was sold again in 1995. Since 1985, Illums Bolighus has not been associated with Illum.

In the 1950s and 60s, ILLUM experienced increasing competition from the large shopping centers that began to spring up in the metropolitan area. In the middle of the 1960s, a parking garage was built and a major renovation was carried out in the fight for the customers' favor. However, this was not enough to make the company a good business, and in 1972 the family had to sell to the British group House of Fraser.

During the 1980s, Illum had financial problems. In 1987 it was taken over by lawyer Jens Jordan together with the controversial contractor Kay Wilhelmsen. They bought both the department store and the buildings for a total of DKK 523 million. A few days later, they sold the buildings, which were valued at DKK 334 million, to themselves for DKK 930 million, with Kreditforeningen Danmark providing a change of ownership loan of DKK 628 million, which resulted in a nod from the Ministry of Housing. Illum was modernized for DKK 250 million, after which the owners sold 60 percent of the Illum property to the Swedish real estate company Pleaid Real Estate for DKK 900 million.

In 1991, the company was bought by the competitor Magasin, who in 2003 resold 80% to the U.S. investment bank Merrill Lynch. The development was reversed in these years, so that the focus was on luxury and quality. In 2004, Magasin was acquired by a consortium headed by the Iceland's Baugur Group, which thus secured 20 percent ownership of ILLUM. The remaining 80 percent was acquired by the same group in August 2005. In 2009, Baugur was declared insolvent in Iceland and entered administration in the United Kingdom. Later that year, ILLUM was acquired by Solstra Investments A/S. In 2011, Illum was again sold and acquired by MGPA, and in 2013, once again, to the Italian department store La Rinascente, owned by the Thai department store and outlet center conglomerate, Central Group, thereby becoming the real owner of ILLUM.

The department store's over 120 stores had a turnover of around DKK 650 million in 2011.

Illum's facade was renovated in 2016. The new facade was designed by Vilhelm Lauritzen Arkitekter.

== Logo ==
The two swallows in ILLUM's logo come from an exchange of letters between A.C. Illum and his fiancée Marie Andersen. In a letter, A.C. asked Illum namely about Marie's hand. The letter in which Marie said "yes please" to a marriage with A.C. Illum, had a small vignette in one corner of the paper. The vignette depicted two swallows flying past a net of telegraph wires and A.C. Illum therefore decided to make the swallows the store's hallmark.
