= 2006 in Denmark =

- Decades: 1980s; 1990s; 2000s; 2010s; 2020s
- See also: Other events of 2006; List of years in Denmark

The following lists events hat happened during 2006 in Denmark.

== Incumbents ==
- Monarch – Margrethe II
- Prime minister – Anders Fogh Rasmussen

== Events ==
=== January ===
- 21 January – The son of Crown Prince Frederik is baptised as Christian Valdemar Henri John.
- 26 January – People in Saudi Arabia call for a boycott of Danish products, which spreads to other countries due to the Jyllands-Posten Muhammad cartoons controversy.
- 29 January – Libya closes its embassy in Denmark over the Muhammad Drawings controversy.

=== February ===
- 4 February – The Danish, and as a consequence of sharing the same building, the Chilean and Swedish embassies in Damascus, are firebombed by protestors denouncing the publication of what they consider sacrilegious cartoons depicting Muhammad. The Norwegian embassy is also burned.
- 5 February – The Danish embassy in Beirut, Lebanon, is set on fire by protesters because of the continued controversy over the cartoons depicting Muhammad, and rumors of Qur'an burnings in Denmark.
- 7 February – Jyllands-Posten Muhammad cartoons controversy
  - An Iranian newspaper, Hamshahri, has announced a competition for the best cartoon of the Holocaust "as a test of the boundaries of free speech".
  - As the Danish embassy in Tehran is attacked by hundreds of protesters, five people are killed in Afghanistan as protests against European Muhammed cartoons sweep across the country.
- 19 February – Jyllands-Posten Muhammad cartoons controversy
  - Italian reform minister Roberto Calderoli resigns after criticism for wearing a T-shirt depicting the cartoons. The incident triggered yesterday's rioting outside the Italian consulate in Benghazi, Libya, in which at least 10 people died.
  - Sixteen people are killed in northern Nigeria as demonstrators protest the cartoons by storming and burning Christian churches and businesses.

=== March ===
- 15 March – Five arrests are made over the UK Islamist demonstration outside the Danish Embassy in London against the cartoons depicting Muhammad.

=== May ===
- 9 May – The serious game 3rd World Farmer is released after it was prototyped as a student project at the University of Copenhagen in 2005.

=== September ===
- 23 September – Remains of Dagmar of Denmark, the mother of the last Tsar of Russia, are transported from the Roskilde Cathedral to Saint Petersburg in order to be reburied in the Peter and Paul Cathedral on 28 September.

=== November ===
- 2 November – MTV Europe Music Awards 2006 are presented in Bella Center, Copenhagen.

=== December ===
- 13 December – Lars Barfoed resigns as Minister of Family and Consumption because of issues with his ministry's food inspections. Carina Christensen is named as his successor 15 December.

== The arts ==
=== Architecture ===
- 22 June – Lundgaard & Tranberg's Kilen building for CBS in Copenhagen wins a 2006 RIBA European Award at the Royal Institute of British Architects' annual awards ceremony in London.
- 30 June – In the Teatro Olimpico in Vicenza, Kim Herforth Nielse from 3XN receives the Dedalo Minosse Prize for the firm's Muziekgebouw in Amsterdam.

=== Film ===
- 19 February – Pernille Fischer Christensen's A Soap wins the Jury Grand Prix at the 56th Berlin International Film Festival.

== Sport ==
=== Badminton ===
- 16–22 – Jens Eriksen and Martin Lundgaard Hansen wins gold in men's double at the 2006 All England Open Badminton Championships.
- 12–16 April – With four gold medals, three silver medals and three bronze medals, Denmark finishes as the best nation at the 20th European Badminton Championships in Den Bosch, Netherlands.
- 18–24 September – Denmark wins two bronze medals at the 2006 IBF World Championships.
- 16 October – Simon Mollyhus and Anders Kristiansen.

wins gold in men's double at French Open.

=== Cycling ===
- Date unknown Robert Slippens (NED) and Danny Stam (NED) win the Six Days of Copenhagen six-day track cycling race.

=== Equestrian sports ===
- 20 August – Denmark wins one gold medal, one silver medal and two bronze medals at the 2006 FEI World Equestrian Games.

=== Football ===
- 6 April – FC Copenhagen wins 2005–06 Royal League by defeating Lillestrøm SK 1–0 in the final.
- 11 May – Randers FC wins the 2005–06 Danish Cup after a 1–0 win against Esbjerg fB in the final at Parken Stadium.

=== Handball ===
- 5 February – Denmark takes the bronze medals at the 2006 European Men's Handball Championship by defeating Croatia.
- December
  - GOG Svendborg is defeated 31–30 by BM Ciudad Real in the second leg of the Round of 16 of the 2006–07 EHF Champions League and is finished in the tournament after 64–58 on aggregate.
  - KIF Kolding defeats MKB Veszprém KC 31–28 in the second leg of the Round of 16 of the 2006–07 EHF Champions League but is finished in the tournament after 60–53 on aggregate.

=== Other ===
- 14 January – Mikkel Kessler defends his WBA super-middleweight title against Eric Lucas in Brøndby, Denmark.
- 21 May – Thomas Bjørn wins Nissan Irish Open on the 2006 European Tour.
- 23 July – Denmark wins the 2006 Speedway World Cup in Reading, England.
- 23 July – Team CSC finishes second in the Team classification of the 2006 Tour de France and Michael Rasmussen wins the Mountains classification.
- 26 July-6 August 2006 – Jakob Andkjær wins a bronze medal in 50 m butterfly at the 2006 European Aquatics Championships.
- 14 October – Mikkel Kessler is elevated to WBA "super champion" status after winning the WBC title in a unification battle against WBC World Champion Markus Beyer, at the Parken Stadium. He won by knockout at 2:58 in round 3.

== Births ==
- 17 May – Oscar Schwartau, footballer
- 16 December – Clement Bischoff, footballer

== Deaths ==
- 4 January – John Hahn-Petersen, actor (born 1930)
- 13 April – Anders Ejnar Andersen, politician (born 1912)
- 14 May – Dagmar Andreasen, businesswoman (born 1920)
- 8 June – Bjørn Wiinblad, ceramist and painter (born 1919)

== See also ==
- 2006 in Danish television
