= 1918 in Denmark =

- Decades: 1890s; 1900s; 1910s; 1920s; 1930s
- See also: Other events of 1918; List of years in Denmark

Events from the year 1918 in Denmark.

== Incumbents ==
- Monarch – Christian X
- Prime minister – Carl Theodor Zahle

== Events ==
- 22 April – The 1918 Folketing election takes place. Three women, the first in Danish history, are elected, among them Elna Munch.

=== Date unknown ===
- Kjøbenhavns Boldklub wins the 1917–18 Danish National Football Tournament by defeating Randers Freja 5–2 in the final.

== Births ==
=== January–March ===
- 2 February – Thorkild Bjørnvig, poet (died 2004)
- 5 March – Sonja Hauberg, writer (died 1947)
- 6 March – Lilly Brændgaard, fashion designer (died 2009)

=== April–June ===
- 18 April – Gabriel Axel, filmmaker (died 2014)
- 9 April – Jørn Utzon, architect (died 2008)
- 27 June – Willy Breinholst, author, screenwriter and humourist (died 2009)

=== July–September ===
- 20 Seåtember – Sven Methling. film director and screenwriter (died 205)

=== October–December ===
- 22 December – Lis Møller journalist and politician (died 1983)

== Deaths ==
=== January–March ===
- 4 January – Carl Aarsleff, sculptor (born 1852)
- 29 March – Fanny Suenssen, author (born 1832)

=== April–June ===
- 6 June – Valdemar Oldenburg, jurist and politician (born 1834)

=== July–September ===
- 26 August – Rogert Møller, architect (born 1844)

=== October–December ===
- 16 November – Johan Henrik Deuntzer, Prime Minister 1901–05 (born 1845)
