= Drewsen =

Drewsen is a surname. Notable people with the surname include:

- Brita Drewsen (1887–1983), Swedish artist and business-woman.
- Gudrun Løchen Drewsen (1867–1946), Norwegian-born American women's rights activist and painter.
- Johan Christian Drewsen (1777-1851), Danish manufacturer and politician.
