= Kaddara =

1921 opera by Hakon Børresen

Kaddara: Folkelivsbilleder fra Grønland (Sketches from the Folk Life in Greenland) is a 1921 Danish-language opera in four acts by Hakon Børresen to a libretto by C.M. Norman-Hansen (1861–1947).

== Recording ==
- Kaddara - Gitta-Maria Sjöberg, Stig Fogh Andersen, Matti Borg, Elisabeth Hanke, Anette Bod, Maria Hanke, Paul Frederiksen Ruse Philharmonic Niels Borksand 2CD, CDKlassisk 2013
