= Lilly Brændgaard =

Danish fashion designer

Lilly Brændgaard Hansen née Jacobsen (1918–2009) was a Danish fashion designer and businesswoman. In 1947, she opened a studio in Vejle where she designed various clothes for women but soon specialized in the more profitable business of wedding dresses. In the mid-1960s, she moved into larger premises in Vejle, founding Denmark's first clothing factory. Established as Kjoleateliet LILLY (LILLY Dress Studio), over the years her firm became known simply as LILLY. On the occasion of its 50th anniversary in 1997, there were nine outlets in Denmark and 13 in Germany.

== Early life ==
Born on 6 March 1918, Lilly Brændgaard Jacobsen was the daughter of the housepainter Martinus Julius Jacobsen (1892–1960) and Ane Kathrine Lauridsen (1898–1973), a seamstress. The eldest of six children, she was brought up in the Vesterbro district of Copenhagen. When she was 14, after training as a seamstress and tailor, she was able to make a living altering clothes the clothes people brought to her, even during the war years where there was a shortage of materials.

== Career ==
When she was 28, she opened her own studio in Vejle. At the time, she was living alone with her nine-year-old son from her first marriage but on 10 July 1947, she married Svend Brændgaard Hansen (1919–2000), a mason and carpenter, who owned the building housing her studio.

Recognizing her special talents, her customers provided plenty of work. Initially, with the help of two seamstresses, she sewed coats, suits and everyday clothing but after 10 years she decided to concentrate on wedding dresses. Her increasing success stemmed from her concern for the individual, making each new bride look like a dream. As a result, she became known for her personalized style, making her a market leader in Denmark. She opened new stores staffed by sales personnel with specialized training, relying on her husband to take care of the interiors.

The slogan Det ender med en Lilly-model (It ends with a Lilly model) devised by her husband stuck over the years. In the late 1970s, production widened from wedding dresses to clothes for other festive occasions such as baptisms and confirmations. Around this time, the firm also began to develop its export business.

By the time the firm celebrated its 50th anniversary in 1997, there were nine stores in Denmark, 13 in Germany and a substantial export business with the United Kingdom and Japan. Her children and grandchildren increasingly took over the firm's operations but Brændgaard herself continued to carry out design work and serve on the board.

After her husband's death on 19 April 2000, Lilly Brændgaard was supported by her large family. On her 90th birthday, she invited them all to a celebration at Vejle's Munkebjerg Hotel. By that time, her grandchildren Eva Dorthe, Anne Kathrine and Bettina had become responsible for running the business. Lilly Brændgaard Hansen died on 21 May 2009, leaving three children, seven grandchildren and 10 great-grandchildren.
