= Andreas Christian Iversen =

Danish-born New Zealand gold miner, orchardist and irrigator

Andreas Christian Iversen (25 February 1834 Janderup, Denmark – 6 September 1911 Earnscleugh, New Zealand) was a Danish-born New Zealand gold miner, orchardist and irrigator.
