= Illums Bolighus =

Danish chain store

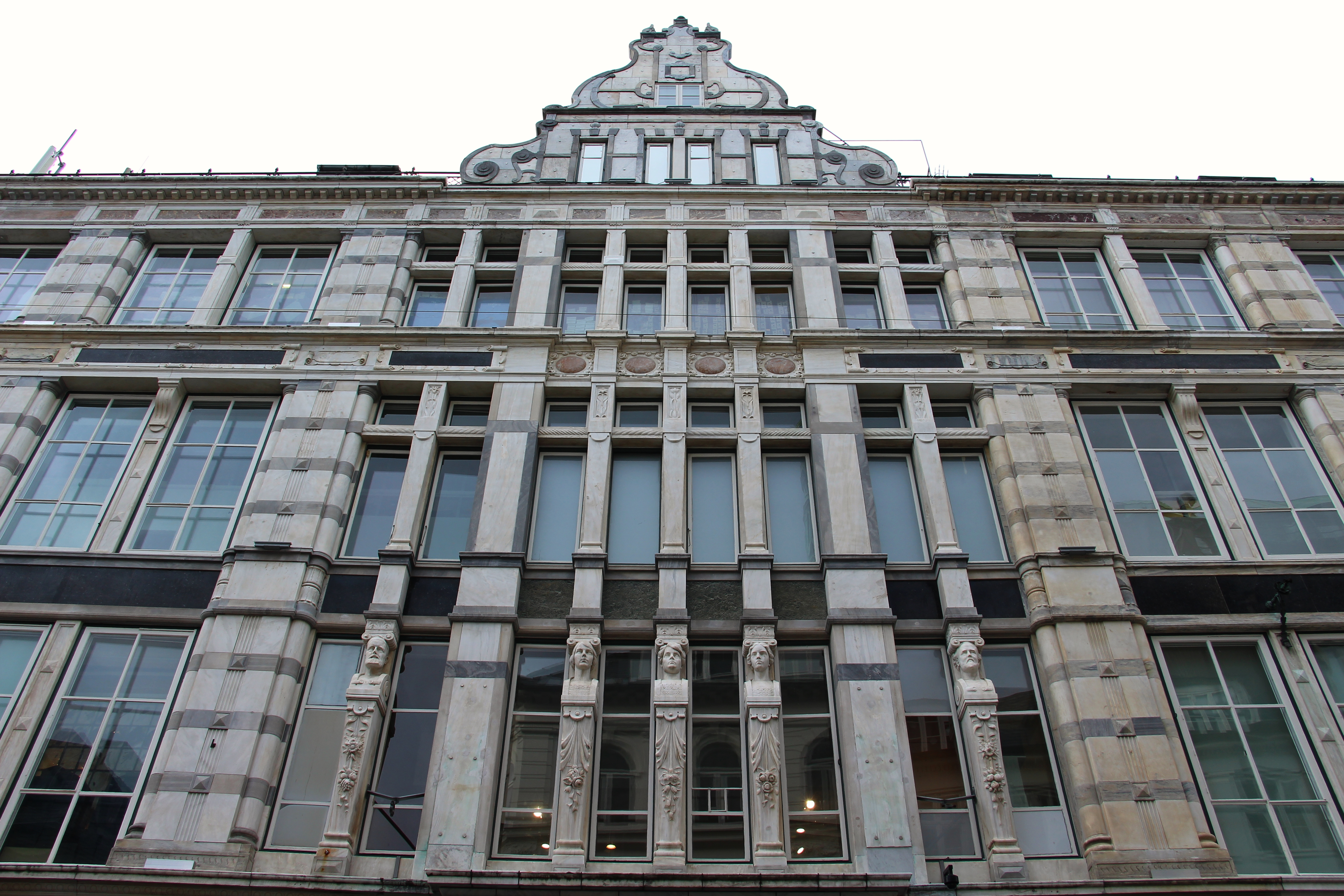
- Trade name: Illums Bolighus
- Company type: Limited company
- Industry: Retailer
- Founded: 1925
- Founders: Kaj Dessau
- Headquarters: Copenhagen, Denmark
- Number of locations: Copenhagen (3), Aarhus (1), Oslo (2), Bergen (2), Trondheim (1), Stockholm (2), Malmö (1), Hamburg (1)
- Area served: Scandinavia, Germany
- Key people: Henrik Ypkendanz (CEO)
- Products: Furniture, home accessories, textiles
- Website: www.illumsbolighus.com

Illums Bolighus is a retailer of household furnishings based in Copenhagen, Denmark. The original Illums Bolighus flagship store is located at Amagertorv 10 in central Copenhagen. The company was in 2005 acquired by an investor group headed by CEO Henrik Ypkendanz and has since then opened a number of new stores in Denmark, Norway, Sweden and Germany.

== History ==
=== Kaj Dessau’s BO, 1928-1941 ===
Illums Bolighus was founded under the name BO in 1925 by Danish entrepreneur Kaj Dessau. The store on Strøget opened in 1928. Brita Drewsen, a Swedish born designer, acted as an artistic consultant. With its arranged interiors which combined furniture with textiles, appointments and artworks (for instance sculptures by Kay Nielsen), the store introduced a concept which had not previously been seen.

=== Illums Bolighus ===
The store was renamed Illums Bolighus in 1941 when it was purchased by the owners of the nearby A.C. Illum department store. The present building was designed in 1961 by Kay Kørbing.

Illums Bolighus was later owned first by Carlsberg Group and later by the private equity fund Axcel. Illums Bolighus was in 2005 sold to a group of five investors headed by CEO Henrik Ypkendanz.

== Locations ==
=== Denmark ===
The Illums Bolighus flagship store in Copenhagen is located at Amagertorv 10. In Copenhagen, Illums Bolighus has also opened outlets in Copenhagen Airport and Tivoli Gardens. It has also opened a store in Aarhus.

=== Norway ===
Illums Bolighus opened its first store abroad in Oslo in 2005. It was followed by a store over three floors on the main shopping street in Bergen in 2013. A new flagship store opened in Oslo in 2017.

=== Sweden ===
The first store in Sweden opened in Stockholm in October 2010. In 2012, a Malmö store was opened in the new shopping centre Emporia. A second store in Stockholm, now in the Mall of Scandinavia, opened in 2015.

=== Germany ===
On 1 November 2016, Illums Bolighus opened a 1,500 square metre store in Hamburg.

== See also ==
- Anton Carl Pedersen Illum
