= Realfiction =

Danish holography company

- Type: 3D Holographic artefacts
- Founded: October 2008
- Founder: Clas Dyrholm, Founder & CEO; Peter Simonsen, Founder & R&D
- Headquarters: Øster Allé 42, København Ø, Copenhagen, Denmark
- Products: Dreamoc
- Website: www.realfiction.com

Realfiction is a Danish company producing the technological artifact, Dreamoc, for experiencing HD 3D holographic motion graphics.

== History ==
Realfiction was established in October 2008, and is now represented by a worldwide reseller network with partners in more than 25 countries and territories. The company has 8 employees and the founders are Clas Dyrholm, Founder & CEO and Peter Simonsen, Founder & R&D.

Realfiction's most popular product (2009) is the Dreamoc, which both is a platform for content for the artifact itself and is also a technological artifact shaped like a glass pyramid, where the Dreamoc content is presented inside as a hologram. There are various artifacts from Realfiction - from 180 degree projections to full HD 360 degree screens.

The Dreamoc's chief purpose is to advertise products for companies - "especially for high profile brands in a competitive retail environment".
