= Kofoeds School =

Coordinates: 55°40′02″N 12°37′03″E

Kofoeds School (Danish: Kofoeds Skole) in Copenhagen, Denmark, is an organization carrying out social work for adults according to the "social pedagogical" principle of personal and vocational empowerment.

The school, founded in 1928, bases its work on Christian and humanitarian principles and among other things, the Danish folk high school movement. It offers education, workshop activities, counseling, accommodation, emergency assistance and relief measures. The aim of the school is to assist people with social problems in improving their social life and relieve them from their underprivileged social situation. The efforts are holistic and the targets tuned to people’s own abilities and qualifications.

== The school concept ==
Kofoeds School is based on the concept that if people are to be assisted socially, they have to be helped educationally, but the terms education and school are understood in the widest sense, not associated exclusively with narrow vocational qualifications. The concept of education is a cornerstone in the work of the school as a principle of development of human resources.

People using the service at Kofoed's School are called students to emphasize the pedagogical approach to dealing with social problems. The school helps the students to develop their own strength, self-esteem and abilities, and focus is on possibilities and the students’ own interests and wishes. Basically, the school approaches the students as ordinary human beings who experience social difficulties in their life.

Since its foundation Kofoeds School has been involved in a range of social issues such as homelessness, unemployment, urban immigration, integration problems for ethnic groups, alcoholism, substance abuse, and psychiatric problems.

== Method ==
The working method of the school emphasizes the importance of the students themselves being active. The aim is not just to help the students but also to help make them take responsibility for their own efforts. The school works on the belief, that help is an ambiguous blessing. Provided without expecting active interplay by the person seeking assistance, it may pacify people and make them dependent. Given the right way, however, it can activate them, make them feel more optimistic and increase their ability to act themselves.

The concept aims at rebuilding and strengthening the students’ self-esteem while at the same time easing their social problems. On working with the students, the primary focus is on their personal strength and abilities, and the method seeks to move people forward, not just to solve immediate problems.

== History ==
Kofoeds School was founded by pastor Hans Christian Kofoed (1898-1952) in 1928, at a time of economic depression. His goal was to help young unemployed men to come back to society as active citizens. H.C. Kofoed, made the slogan “hjælp til selvhjælp” (literally: “help to self-help”) the center of his work. He wished to help the unemployed differently compared to usual charities that often placed the unemployed in a role of passive receivers of assistance.

Kofoeds himself had experienced unemployment then he was young, and he had remembered since then that if one is being helped in the wrong way, it is possible to cause more damage than benefit. Therefore he based his work on the principle that an unemployed person may receive food or his wages only after performing an activity. When he receives it this way, it is not humiliating but rather brings satisfaction and a sense of justice. At the time Kofoed’s methods were revolutionary.

Among the first activities of Kofoeds School were a washroom and a laundry, where people could wash and do their laundry for free. And the school opened a workshop where it was possible to repair old garments and shoes. When Kofoed found other collaborators, he opened courses in Danish, English, French, German, counting, humanities, gymnastics and singing. Students could use the services of a legal counselor and a physician.

In the following years, the number of women learning housework increased. There was a joinery shop, in which men could repair used furniture, and there was a garden in which they could grow vegetables for their needs for free. Kofoed bought a farm in 1940 where a school for adolescents was developed, in which young agricultural workers attended an intensive re-socializing course.

The number of students grew rapidly in the first decades after its start, and so did the size of the school and the activities offered. Soon Kofoeds School was a well-known institution throughout Denmark, and Hans Christian Kofoed himself became a renowned, public figure. Both the work of H.C. Kofoed and his school received a lot of goodwill and respect from all layers of society, and when Kofoed died following a car accident in 1952, the country was in shock. More than 2000 people attended his funeral.

Students with yet bigger and cumulative problems started to appear at the school in the 1950s. Often they were unemployed alcoholics, people with psycho-pathological problems and drug addicts. The number of students grew intensively in the 1960s leading to the broadening of the offer of the school by many other activities.

In the following decade, employers and directors of the school entered a conflict about the perception of the school’s mission. Certain practical and ideological changes followed, but in 1979 a return to the original principle of help to self-help recommenced.

At the present day, the school in Copenhagen offers assistance to those students who are in a temporarily difficult life situation as well as to those who are in a much deeper crisis. The basic pedagogical principles of activation are still accentuated in order to let students try to deal with the problems on their own.

== New schools and international work ==
From early on after its start in 1928, Kofoeds School acquired facilities outside the main school in Copenhagen to suit the needs of the different kinds of students and their specific problems. However it was not until the turn of the millennium – in 2003 – that an independent working school opened in Denmark, this time in Århus. The School in Århus today serves about 70 students daily.

During the 1990s, Kofoeds School started making more foreign contacts and engaged itself in various international collaborations, but up until 1997 the school in Copenhagen was the only one. However, building on a collaboration between Kofoeds School and Polish social workers begun in the aftermath of World War II and since then progressed, the first sister school opened in Siedlce, Poland in 1997. Since then a string of schools has opened in Central and Eastern Europe and today the organization numbers 15 schools in Poland, the Czech Republic, Estonia, Lithuania, Armenia and Ukraine.
