= Louise Winteler =

Danish teacher and school founder

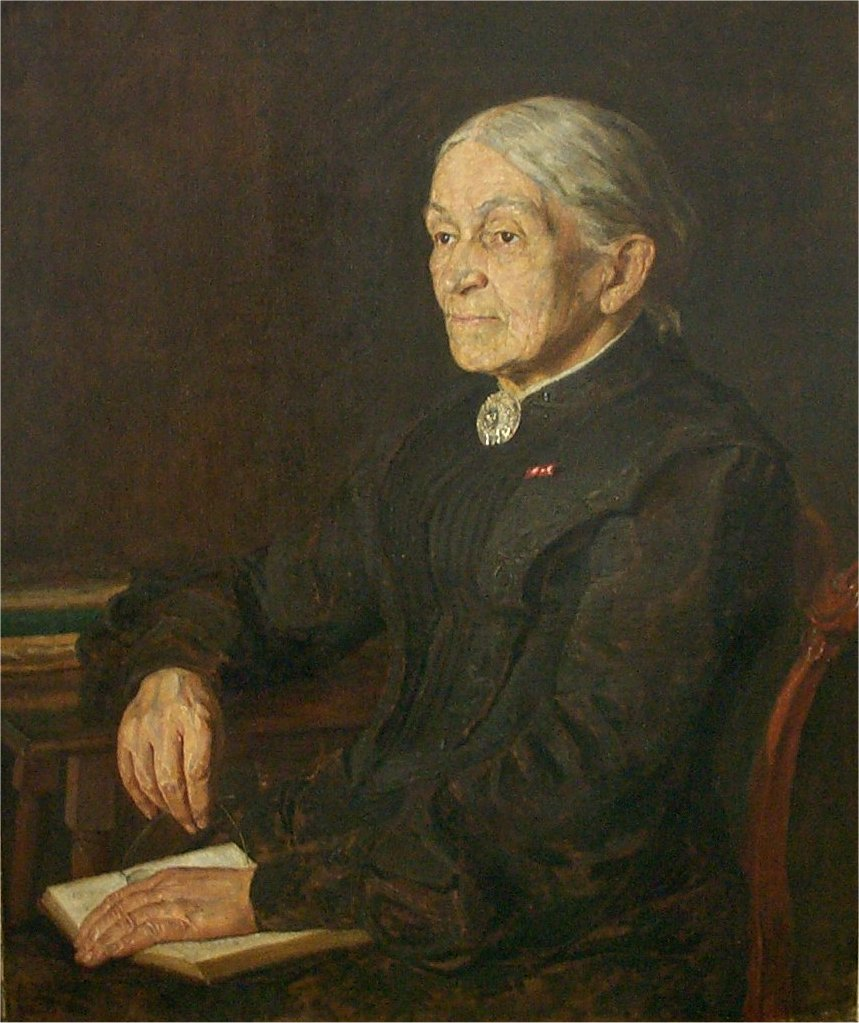
- Born: Anna Christence Louise Winteler; 25 March 1834; Heide
- Died: 31 March 1925 (aged 91); Odense
- Occupation: Teacher

Anna Christence Louise Winteler (25 March 1834 – 31 March 1925) was an early Danish schoolmistress. Trained as a teacher in Altona, she taught in Holstein from 1851. In 1853 she moved to Odense where she first taught three girls privately in German but soon turned to Danish as the number of pupils grew. This led to her establishing the progressive Louise Winteler's girls school which moved into its own premises in 1880. Winteler became a prominent figure in Danish education in the early 20th century, constantly improving her own abilities by study trips to Germany, Switzerland and England. She headed the Danish Girls School Organization from its foundation in 1893 until 1911 and worked towards Nordic collaboration. By the time she retired in 1912, her school had more than 300 pupils.

== Early life ==
Born in Heide on 25 March 1834, Anna Christence Louise Winteler was the daughter of the carpenter Matthias Martin Friedrich Winteler (1806–1882) and his wife Louise Charlotte née Volkens (1812–1902). She was the eldest of the family's 13 children. While at school, she was significantly influenced by the poet Klaus Groth. She received basic teacher training in Altona (1850–51) but as a result of financial difficulties was forced to begin teaching in a German-language boys school in Hamburg.

== Career ==
Unhappy with her teaching experiences in Holstein, in 1853 she moved to Odense where she lived with a distant relative. As a private tutor, she initially taught three girls in German but soon attracted many more and began teaching in Danish. This soon led to the beginnings of the Louis Winteler School which quickly became known for its sound, progressive approach. Despite criticism from Grudtvigian interests in the 1860s, Winteler continued to offer her well-structured approach, giving special attention to the needs of girls. In 1863, premises for the school were found in the Klingenberg district of Odense and in 1880, the school moved to Klostervej where with state funding a new high school building was completed in 1908. In 1887, the school was able to have students take higher preparatory examination and in 1908, it was permitted to include the school matriculation exam (studenterexamen) which provided access to universities. Winteler became a prominent figure in Danish education in the early 20th century, constantly improving her own abilities by study trips to Germany, Switzerland and England. She headed the Danish Girls School Organization from its foundation in 1893 until 1911 and worked towards Nordic collaboration. By the time she retired in 1912, her school had more than 300 pupils. In 1920, the state took her school over and named it Sct. Knuds Gymnasium.

Louise Winteler died in Odense on 31 March 1925.
