= Brita Drewsen =

Swedish artist and businesswoman (1887–1983)

- Born: May 5, 1887; Stockholm, Sweden
- Died: September 18, 1983 (aged 96); Lundtofte, Denmark
- Occupations: Artist, businesswoman

Brita Drewsen (5 May 1887 – 18 September 1983) was a Swedish artist and businesswoman who spent her working life in Denmark, creating household textiles and handicrafts. In 1925, working with the Danish entrepreneur Kaj Dessau, she designed the pioneering interiors of the Copenhagen household furnishings store, now Illums Bolighus, attracting international acclaim. In the 1930s, she collaborated with the weaver Gudrun Clemens, producing rugs, curtains and upholstery at "The Blue Factory" (Den blaa Fabrik) in Lyngby. Together with the designer Bjørn Wiinblad, she created furniture and arranged arts and crafts exhibitions there in the 1970s. Drewsen's early preferences for softly coloured textiles formed an important aspect of Danish design.

== Biography ==
Born on 5 May 1887 in Stockholm, Brita Drewsen was the daughter of Ernst Otto Leopold Sjöberg (1859–1938) og Anna Henriette Morell (1866–1963). Brought up by a well-to-do family, she became familiar with modern interior design and furnishings in her Stockholm home. She was introduced to arts and crafts at Stockholm Läns Hemslöjdförening. In 1914, she exhibited her artefacts at an exhibition of Swedish crafts in Copenhagen.

In 1914, Drewsen opened a shop in Copenhagen where she sold Swedish furniture and textiles. When she began to produce her own textiles, she ensured that the fabrics were not only of high quality but that they exhibited aesthetically attractive design features. In 1925, she became the artistic consultant for the entrepreneur Kaj Dessau who in 1928 designed the household furnishings store BO in the centre of Copenhagen, later known as Illums Bolighus. The goods displayed were placed in brightly lit, artistically designed interiors where the furniture and textiles were accompanied by artwork, including sculptures by Kai Nielsen. It was the first time a retail store enjoyed such innovative displays.

Drewsen went on to use natural materials for her own light-coloured textiles and produced carpets together for Haderslev Klædefabrik. Their finely presented patterns made them suitable for use in artistically designed "funkis" homes. Restrictions on imports in the 1930s made it attractive to work with Danish materials. In 1934, she began to collaborate with Gudrun Clemens who had developed a carpet production facility at Den blaa Fabrik (The Blue Factory) in Lyngby with a workforce of 20. Both women had a good sense of business and the same appreciation of design and quality. The factory grew rapidly, producing carpeting, upholstery and household fabrics, purchased by discerning clients. The facility continued operations until 1965 when it moved to Glostrup. The following year, Bjørn Wiinblad moved into what he called "The Blue House" (Det blaa Hus) while Drewsen lived in the "fairy tale house" she had built in the garden. Together they arranged joint exhibitions on the premises and designed furniture together.

Brita Drewsen died in Lundtofte on 18 September 1983.
