= Han Kjøbenhavn =

Danish menswear brand

HAN Kjøbenhavn
- Company type: Clothing, Accessories
- Industry: Fashion/Art
- Founded: 2008
- Headquarters: Copenhagen, Denmark
- Products: Menswear, Womenswear, Eyewear, Jewelry, Accessories
- Website: hankjobenhavn.com

Han Kjøbenhavn is a brand of men's wear based out of Copenhagen, Denmark. It was founded by Jannik Wikkelsø Davidsen in 2008.

== History ==
The brand launched as an eyewear line and then expanded into apparel. Han Kjøbenhavn's first flagship store is located on Pilestræde 30 in central Copenhagen.

Han Kjøbenhavn presents at Copenhagen Fashion Week, which is held every year in February and August. The company's AW12 fashion film received a bronze lion for their "AW Collection 2012" film at the Cannes Lions International Festival of Creativity. In 2013, Han Kjøbenhavn made a list of the 15 best Scandinavian menswear brands in Complex. In 2014, GQ listed Han Kjøbenhavn as one of eight must-know Scandinavian menswear brands. In 2022, Kjøbenhavn designed Julia Fox' Oscar ceremony dress, a black leather cocktail dress with a collar resembling a large hand choking her neck.

Han Kjøbenhavn opened its first US shop in 2013 (New York), its first French shop in 2015 (Paris), and opened a flagship store at Beak Street in London in 2022. In 2023, Kjøbenhavn bought out its investors and launched a "democratised ownership" model where its followers can buy small chunks of non-voting shares of the company.
