= Dagmar Orlamundt =

Danish actress (1863–1939)

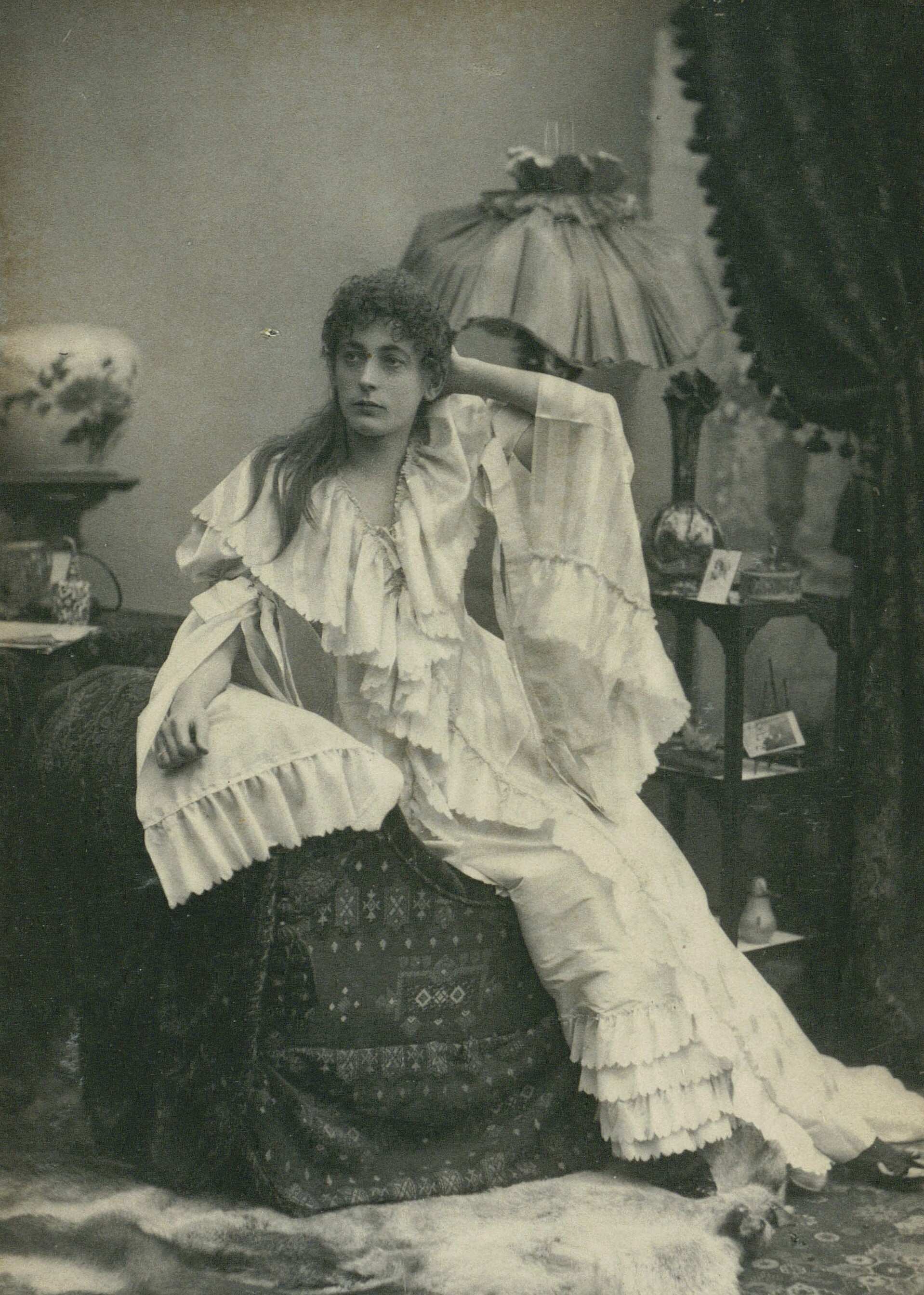
- Orlamundt in 1893
- Born: Dagmar Lydia Hansen; 7 July 1863; Copenhagen, Denmark
- Died: 10 January 1939 (aged 75); Gentofte, Denmark
- Occupation: Actress
- Years active: 1877 — 1932
- Parent(s): Hendrik Christian Hansen, Anne Cathrine Rasmussen

Dagmar Lydia Orlamundt, née Hansen (1863–1939) was a Danish actress from Odense who made her debut when only 14 at Odense Teater. In the 1890s, she was engaged by the Casino Theatre in Copenhagen where she was particularly successful in comic parts, playing the title role in the farce Charley's Aunt. From the turn of the century, she performed in Copenhagen at Dagmar Teatret and at Folketeatret until her retirement from the stage in 1932.

== Biography ==
Born Dagmar Lydia Hansen to gardener Hendrik Christian Hansen (1817-1903) and his wife, Anne Catherine Rasmussen (1822-1895), on 7 July 1863 in Odense, the young actress also learned sewing and to mend costumes. She married fellow actor 26 years her senior, Hans Christian Orlamundt (1837-1912). He was son of theater director Carl Wilhelm Orlamundt and actress Petrine Larsen.

The newlywed couple traveled to Copenhagen, where they performed at the Dagmar Theater in 1883. By 1927, she had celebrated 50 years as an actress, choosing to retire by 1932.

Orlamundt died on 10 January 1939.
