= 1918–19 Danish National Football Tournament =

National Football Tournament Landsfodboldturneringen
- Season: 1918–19
- Champions: Akademisk Boldklub

Statistics of Danish 1st Division in the 1918/1919 season.

== Province tournament ==
=== First round ===
- Boldklubben 1901 2–0 Korsør Boldklub
- Odense Boldklub 2–1 Aarhus Gymnastikforening

=== Second round ===
- Odense Boldklub 4–5 Boldklubben 1901

== Copenhagen Championship ==
Pos	Team	Pld	W	D	L	GF	GA	GD	Pts
1	Akademisk Boldklub	12	11	0	1	46	16	+30	22
2	Boldklubben af 1893	12	8	2	2	51	20	+31	18
3	Kjøbenhavns Boldklub	12	8	1	3	41	21	+20	17
4	Boldklubben Frem	12	5	2	5	23	19	+4	12
5	Boldklubben 1903	12	3	2	7	19	27	−8	8
6	KFUM	12	2	1	9	18	67	−49	5
7	Østerbros Boldklub	12	1	0	11	14	42	−28	2

== Danish Final ==
- Akademisk Boldklub 3–0 Boldklubben 1901
