= 1920–21 Danish National Football Tournament =

National Football Tournament Landsfodboldturneringen
- Season: 1920–21
- Champions: Akademisk Boldklub

Statistics of Danish National Football Tournament in the 1920/1921 season.

== Province tournament ==
=== First round ===
- Helsingør IF 3-2 IK Viking Rønne

=== Second round ===
- Aarhus Gymnastikforening 2-1 Boldklubben 1909
- Boldklubben 1901 2-1 Helsingør IF

=== Third round ===
- Aarhus Gymnastikforening 3-1 Boldklubben 1901

== Copenhagen Championship ==
Pos	Team	Pld	W	D	L	GF	GA	GD	Pts
1	Akademisk Boldklub	8	3	5	0	17	12	+5	11
2	Boldklubben 1903	8	5	1	2	16	12	+4	11
3	Boldklubben af 1893	8	4	2	2	22	14	+8	10
4	Kjøbenhavns Boldklub	8	3	1	4	15	20	−5	7
5	Boldklubben Frem	8	0	1	7	6	18	−12	1

== Final ==
- Akademisk Boldklub 3-0 Aarhus Gymnastikforening
