= Den Kongelige Gæst =

Opera

- Opera by Hakon Børresen
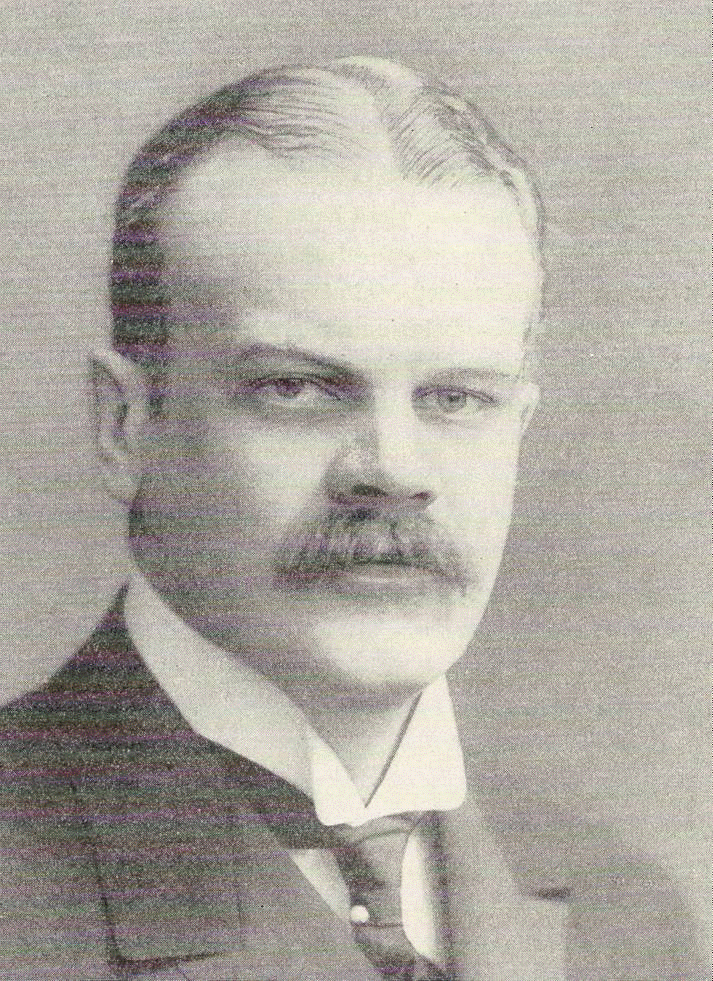
- The composer
- Translation: The Royal Guest
- Librettist: Svend Leopold
- Language: Danish
- Based on: Henrik Pontoppidan's story
- Premiere: 15 November 1919; Royal Danish Theatre, Copenhagen

Den Kongelige Gæst (English: The Royal Guest) is an opera in one act by Hakon Børresen; the libretto is by Svend Leopold, and is based on a story by Henrik Pontoppidan. The opera was first given on 15 November 1919, at the Royal Danish Theatre, and has since proven to be among the most popular of Danish operas.

The story plays out an evening in a doctor's home on the Jutland peninsula around 1900. Dr. Høyer and his wife are expecting guests for a dress ball. However, all the guests decline at the last moment, and Dr. Høyer is irritated, but slightly relieved. Instead, the family receives a surprise visitor, the unknown gentleman Prince Carnival, who acts in a free and easy manner, playing the piano, talking with Dr. Hoyer's wife, and suggesting to the couple to carry on with the party.

Duration: 1 hour

== Recording ==
The opera has received only two recording:

- The Royal Guest Stig Fogh Andersen, tenor, Edith Guillaume, mezzo-soprano, Tina Kiberg, soprano, Lise-Lotte Nielsen, soprano Guido Paevatalu, baritone. Odense Symphony Orchestra Tamás Vetö conductor
- Den Kongelige Gæst Poul Wiedemann, tenor, Dorothy Larsen, soprano, Albert Høeberg, baryton, Det Kongelige Kapel conducted by Johan Hye-Knudsen, recorded live at The Royal Theatre in Copenhagen, 27-4-1948 (Naxos Historical 8.112004)
