= Desmi =

DESMI A/S
- Type: Public limited company (A/S)
- Industry: Pumps and pumping solutions
- Founded: 1834 (as De Smithske), 1875 (company no. 538), 2003 (renamed DESMI A/S)
- Founder: Henning Smith
- Headquarters: Nørresundby, Denmark
- Key people: Humphrey Lau (CEO), Niels Erik Olsen (Chairman of the Board)
- Products: Centrifugal pumps, gear pumps, ballast water systems, oil spill response equipment
- Revenue: DKK 1,865 million (2025)
- Number of employees: 1,033 (2025)
- Parent: Flow Danish BidCo ApS
- Subsidiaries: DESMI Pumping Technology A/S, DESMI Ro-Clean A/S, DESMI Danmark A/S, DESMI Pumping Technology (Suzhou) Co. Ltd.
- Website: www.desmi.com

DESMI A/S is a Danish manufacturer of pumps and pumping solutions, headquartered in Nørresundby. The company was founded in 1834 in Aalborg by Henning Smith under the name De Smithske Jernstøberier og Maskinværksteder (The Smith Ironworks and Machine Shops) and is considered Denmark's oldest active joint-stock company. In 1875, the company was converted into a joint-stock company registered as number 538, and in April 2003 it officially changed its name to DESMI A/S.

DESMI manufactures centrifugal pumps, ROTAN gear pumps, ballast water systems and oil spill response systems. According to private equity firm One Equity Partners, the company's pumps and systems are sold to more than 150 countries through a network of subsidiaries and distributors on six continents.

In the 2025 financial year, DESMI recorded net revenue of DKK 1,865 million and a net profit of DKK 114 million, with 1,033 employees.

== History ==
=== Founding and early years (1834–1875) ===
The founder of DESMI, Henning Smith – recorded in his birth certificate as Henning Jacobsen Smed – was born on 1 January 1792 in Randers. His father, blacksmith Jacob Michelsen Smed, died as early as 1794, and Henning grew up with his mother and stepfather Niels Jørgensen, who ran a blacksmith's workshop.

On 21 December 1833, citizen Henning Smith received a royal privilege to open an iron foundry in Aalborg. On 9 June 1834, he presented his products to the public for the first time in a local newspaper advertisement. The foundry was established at Algade 54, opposite Budolfi Cathedral, where products including stoves, windows and cast iron goods were manufactured.

In 1848, the company employed 47 workers and was divided into a foundry and a machine workshop. At the time, Aalborg had a population of approximately 8,000, and A/S De Smithske was the city's second largest industrial enterprise.

=== Joint-stock company and growth (1875–1939) ===
In 1875, the company moved to larger premises at Vesterbro in Aalborg, close to the current Aalborg Congress Centre. That same year, Denmark passed its first Companies Act, and De Smithske was converted into a joint-stock company registered as number 538.

From 1900 to 1970, the company also manufactured church bells.

In 1930, the company acquired the rights to ROTAN, a rotary internal gear pump invented by Jens Nielsen, who had held the American patent since 1904 and the Danish patent since 1912. The pump had previously been marketed by the machine workshop Myhrwold & Rasmussen in Copenhagen.

In 1935–1936, the foundry, machine workshop and boilermaking shop were relocated to new facilities at Annebergvej on the outskirts of Aalborg.

=== World War II and post-war period (1940–1981) ===
During World War II, De Smithske manufactured, among other things, peat milling machines for use in the bog Store Vildmose northwest of Aalborg. The machines were subsequently exported to Finland, the Netherlands and Ireland in the period 1945–1949.

On 1 July 1977, the foundry closed, and by the end of the year the machine workshop – along with the subsidiary Skalborg Maskinfabrik A/S, which manufactured gearboxes – was relocated to the current facilities at Tagholm 1 in Nørresundby. In 1979, Skalborg Maskinfabrik A/S merged with A/S De Smithske. In 1981, the Steel Division (boilermaking shop) was sold to Monberg & Thorsen.

=== International expansion and acquisitions (1978–2002) ===
In 1978, the first international subsidiary, DESMI Ltd., was established in the United Kingdom. In 1991, DESMI Inc. was incorporated in Delaware, USA. In 1993–1994, DESMI acquired the pump division Thrige Pumper from Thrige Titan A/S in Odense, which doubled both revenue and the number of employees. The acquisition included the German subsidiary Rotan Pumpengesellschaft mbH (now DESMI GmbH Rotan Pumpengesellschaft) and the American Rotan Inc., which merged with DESMI Inc. in 1994.

In 1995, DESMI Ro-Clean A/S was established as a joint marketing and sales company for environmental equipment in partnership with Roulunds Fabriker A/S. In 2000, all pump manufacturing was centralised at the factory in Nørresundby. In 2002, DESMI acquired the Dutch distributor K&R Pompen B.V. and established DESMI Norge AS in Tønsberg.

=== Rename and global growth (2003–2021) ===
In April 2003, A/S De Smithske changed its name to DESMI A/S, which had previously served as a trade name. The rename was partly due to the difficulty of pronouncing A/S De Smithske in foreign languages, and partly to avoid confusion with product lines and trademarks. For historical reasons, A/S De Smithske was retained as a secondary name.

In 2005, DESMI established production in China by founding DESMI Pumping Technology (Suzhou) Co., Ltd. near Shanghai. That same year, DESMI took full ownership of DESMI Ro-Clean A/S. In 2006/2007, the Danish sales and service division was spun off as the independent subsidiary DESMI Danmark A/S.

In 2009, DESMI entered into a strategic partnership with A.P. Møller – Mærsk and Skjølstrup & Grønborg (UltraAqua) to establish DESMI Ocean Guard A/S, a company specialising in ballast water treatment systems for ships with the CompactClean product. DESMI took full ownership of DESMI Ocean Guard A/S in July 2014, when A.P. Møller – Mærsk and UltraAqua sold their stakes. In December 2021, DESMI Ocean Guard received the Børsen Gazelle 2021 award as Denmark's fastest-growing manufacturing company, having achieved growth of 3,245% since 2017.

In 2012, the group structure was reorganised with three business units reporting to the parent company: an oil spill response unit (DESMI Ro-Clean A/S), a pump unit (DESMI Pumping Technology A/S) and a contracting unit (DESMI Contracting A/S).

=== Change of ownership and recent developments (2022–) ===
On 22 June 2022, DESMI announced that private equity firm One Equity Partners (OEP) would acquire a majority stake of 75% in the company. The previous owner, businessman Henrik Sørensen, and the company's CFO retained the remaining 25%. That same year, Humphrey Lau joined as the new CEO.

In February 2025, DESMI A/S acquired Nordan Marine A/S, a Danish company founded in 2011 by Kent Mahon Krogh and Allan Bech, providing service and repair solutions for cargo and fuel handling systems on LPG-, LEG- and LNG-vessels. Nordan Marine has approximately 30 employees.

In April 2026, the Nordic IP advisory firm Zacco Denmark A/S presented DESMI with the Zacco Innovation Award 2026 for the company's strong innovation culture and strategic approach to product development and patenting. The award is given to companies that have developed new innovative products and successfully patented them to the benefit of Danish society.

== Financials ==
Year	Net revenue (DKK)	Net profit (DKK)	Equity (DKK)	Employees
2025	1,865 million	114 million	753 million	1,033
2024	1,704 million	128 million	802 million	1,044
2023	1,954 million	167 million	728 million	1,029
2022	1,880 million	152 million	575 million	976

Source: Danish Business Authority (CVR) and Lex.dk

== Products and business areas ==
DESMI's primary business areas are Marine & Offshore, Industry / Utility, EnviRo-Clean, Defense, AquaCulture and New Green Solutions.

Marine & Offshore covers the supply of centrifugal pumps and gear pumps to the shipping industry, including pumps for lubrication, fuel, cooling and cargo.

Industry / Utility encompasses pumps and systems for industrial processes, water supply and wastewater, including combined heat and power plants and water treatment.

EnviRo-Clean is operated by the subsidiary DESMI Ro-Clean A/S and covers equipment for combating and recovering marine oil spills as well as collecting waste and plastics from rivers, straits and harbours.

Defense covers pumps and pumping systems for the defence sector, including portable pumps for emergency response purposes.

AquaCulture provides pumping solutions for fish farming and aquaculture.

New Green Solutions offers solutions for decarbonisation and the green transition of the maritime sector, including systems for alternative fuels.

DESMI's ROTAN is a rotary internal gear pump suitable for handling viscous liquids. The patent dates back to 1904 (USA) and 1912 (Denmark).

== Organisation ==
DESMI A/S has its global headquarters in Nørresundby and is also represented in Denmark in Odense, Kolding, and Copenhagen. The parent company is Flow Danish BidCo ApS. Private equity firm One Equity Partners (OEP) is the majority shareholder with 75%.

Day-to-day management is handled by CEO Humphrey Lau, who joined in 2022. The Chairman of the Board is Niels Erik Olsen.

Internationally, DESMI is represented through subsidiaries and offices in over 20 countries, including Germany, the United Kingdom, Norway, the Netherlands, China, South Korea, France, Singapore, the United States, India, the United Arab Emirates, Tanzania, Ecuador, Poland, Sweden, Canada, Greece, Italy, Nigeria and Turkey.

== See also ==
- Pump
- Ballast water
- A.P. Møller – Mærsk
