= Mette Marie Astrup =

Danish actress (1760–1834)

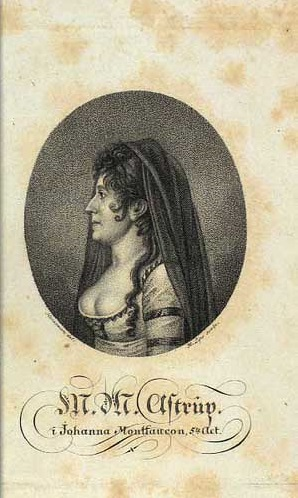
Mette Marie Astrup

Mette Marie Astrup (25 April 1760 – 16 February 1834) was a Danish actress, one of the best known of her time in Denmark. She enjoyed a career totaling fifty years at the Royal Danish Theatre in Copenhagen.

== Biography ==
Astrup was born in Copenhagen, Denmark. She was the child of Sven Andersen Astrup, a former servant who was employed as porter at the Royal Danish Theatre upon its foundation in 1748. She began her performing career in 1772, and by 1773 was employed at the Theatre itself, which was always short of female actors in the 18th century.

She became a student of the theatre's primadonna Lisbeth Cathrine Amalie Rose (1738–1793), and was widely regarded as her successor; she played romantic parts, dramatic tragedy and, in her later years, gentle mothers. From 1777 until its dissolution in 1779 she was a member of Det Dramatiske Selskab, a students' club for young actors, which ceased after a short but very active period of cultural development, and whilst there was a student of Fredrik Schwarz. She was described as dignified and with a great feeling for her costume, which was designed by the actors themselves. However, when the "new style" of acting was introduced onto the stage in 1808, her way of acting then became unfashionable.

She played Leonore in Den Stundenlöse (1773), Else Skolemesters in Barselstuen (1778), both plays by Ludvig Holberg as well as Lady Macbeth in the play Macbeth (1817) by William Shakespeare.

Astrup never married, but she did have a long-term relationship with Adam Hauch, who was director of the Royal Danish Theatre from 1794 to 1798, and again from 1801 to 1811 (she had a son, Adam Wilhelm Astrup, believed to have been fathered by him). She lived all her life in the porter's residence at the theatre; this position was inherited within her family, and was subsequently managed by her mother Dorthe, and then by her older sister Sophie, after her father's death in 1792. Her other sister, Anne Marie, also worked at the Theatre, as a dresser in the wardrobe department. Mette Marit Astrup gave her last performance in 1823, retiring after fifty years on the stage.

== List of roles ==
=== Comediehuset ===
- 1773 Den sanseløse Isabella
- 1773 Sidney as Mathurine
- 1774 Coquetten og den forstilte skønhed as Lydia, Cydalises kusine
- 1774 De pæne piger as Leonore
- 1774 Den lønlige kærlighed as Lucilla
- 1774 Den politiske kandestøber

=== Royal Danish Theatre ===
- 1775 List over list as Caroline, Mad. Argans datter
- 1775 Menechmi as Isabelle
- 1776 Den taknemmelige søn as Grethe
- 1776 Den uformodentlige hjemkomst as Juliane
- 1776 Søhavnen as Benjamine
- 1776 Væddemaalet as Frøken Adelaide
- 1777 Den gerrige as Mariane, Cleantes Elskede
- 1777 Den straffede gæk as Angelique
- 1777 Den tredieve aars pige as Julie
- 1777 Det genstridige sindelag as Angelique
- 1777 Diderich Menschenskræk as Hyacinthe, Leanders Kæreste
- 1777 Gert Westphaler as Leonora
- 1778 Balders død as Valkyrie
- 1778 Barselstuen as Else Skolemesters
- 1778 Celinde as Markisen af Boisville
- 1778 Den knurvorne doktor as Clarice Terignans Kæreste
- 1778 Den politiske kandestøber as Mad. Sanderus, raadsherreinde
- 1778 Den aabenmundede as Hortensia
- 1778 Det lykkelige skibbrud as Leonora, datter af første ægteskab
- 1778 Don Ranudo de Calibrados as Isabella, Gonzalos søster
- 1778 Henrik den Fjerdes jagt as Agathe, forlovet med Richard
- 1778 Hver mands ven as Hortense
- 1778 Ines af Castro as Constance, forlovet med Don Pedro
- 1778 Noctambulus as Rosalie
- 1778 Ulysses von Ithacia as Řllegaard
- 1778 Zarine as Zarine, Sacernes Dronning
- 1779 Celinde as Markisen af Boisville
- 1779 De forstilte utroskaber as Angelica
- 1779 De nysgerrige mandfolk as Fru Lisidor
- 1779 Den bedragne formynder as Emilie
- 1779 Den uheldige lighed as Miss Molly, Kammerpige
- 1779 Det unge menneske paa prøve as Isabelle
- 1779 Faderen as Sophie, et ubekendt Fruentimmer
- 1779 Forøderen as Cydalise
- 1779 Hekseri as Apelone, skuespillerinde
- 1779 Melampe as Philocyne
- 1779 Spøgelset med trommen as Baronessen
- 1779 Uden hoved og hale Kærling
- 1780 Den uformodentlige forhindring as Julie, Lycanders * broderdatter
- 1780 Henrik som tjener to herrer as Lucilia
- 1780 Skotlænderinden as Lindane, en Skotlænderinde
- 1780 Tartuffe as Mariane, Orgons Datter
- 1781 Den uheldige lighed as Fanny, Berkleys Kone
- 1781 Huset i oprør as Komtesse Rosaura
- 1781 Kavaleren og damen as Donna Virginia
- 1781 Kun seks retter as Wilhelmine
- 1781 Kærlighed paa prøve as Leonora, Leanders Kæreste
- 1782 De fortrædelige hændelser as Angelique
- 1782 De nysgerrige fruentimmere as Julie
- 1782 Den gifte filosof as Melite, Aristes Hustru
- 1782 Eugenie as Eugenie, Baronens Datter
- 1782 Feen Ursel as Berthe, Dronning
- 1782 Modens sæder as Julie, Gerontes Datter
- 1782 Tartuffe as Mariane, Orgons datter
- 1782 Ulysses von Ithacia as Pallas
- 1783 Berverley as Madam Beverley
- 1783 Coquetten og den forstilte kyskhed as Cydalise, Damis's Broderdatter
- 1783 Den forlorne søn as Leonore, Jeronimus's Datter
- 1783 Den genstridige sindelag as Angelique
- 1783 Den gerrige as Mariane, Cleantes Elskede
- 1783 Den værdige fader as Lovise, Wermanns Datter
- 1783 Eugenie as Eugenie, Baronens Datter
- 1783 Hververne as Philippine, Rosenaus Datter
- 1783 Søofficererne as Frøken Winning, Sir Arthurs Myndling
- 1783 Zaira as Zaire
- 1784 Arsene as Myris
- 1784 Bagtalelsens skole as Maria
- 1784 Den butte velgører as Angelique, Fru Dalancours Søster
- 1784 Den kærlige kone as Grevinde Eleonora
- 1784 Den politiske kandestøber as Mad. Abrahams, raadsherreinde
- 1784 Den stundesløse as Leonore
- 1784 Diderich Menschenskræk as Hyacinthe, Leanders Kæreste
- 1784 Tartuffe as Mariane, Orgons datter
- 1785 Bagtalelsens skole as Maria
- 1785 De nysgerrige mandfolk as Frøken Julie
- 1785 Den døve elsker as Julie
- 1785 Emilie Galotti as Emilie Galotti
- 1785 Fejltagelserne as Frøken Constance
- 1785 Mændenes skole as Leonore
- 1786 Den løgnagtige tjener as Fru Sip
- 1786 Den politiske kandestøber as Mad. Abrahams, raadsherreinde
- 1786 Det unge menneske efter moden as Mariane
- 1786 Fusentasten as Hypolite, Anselmes Datter
- 1786 Raptussen as Jenny
- 1786 Vestindianeren as Lovise, Kapt. Dudleys Datter
- 1787 Bagtalelsens skole as Maria
- 1787 De nysgerrige fruentimmere as Julie
- 1787 Democritus as Criseis, Thalers fornemste Datter
- 1787 Den virkelige vise as Jomfru Sophie Vanderk, Vanderks Datter
- 1787 Fændriken Sophie, hans Datter
- 1787 Tartuffe as Mariane, Orgons datter
- 1788 Aktierne as Frøken Augusta
- 1788 Bagtalelsens skole as Maria
- 1788 Bussemanden as Fru Staverup
- 1788 Den politiske kandestøber as Mad. Sanderus, raadsherreinde
- 1788 Den butte velgører as Angelique, Fru Dalancours Søster
- 1788 Den gerrige as Mariane, Cleantes Elskede
- 1788 Den politiske kandestøber as Mad. Abrahams, raadsherreinde
- 1788 Den vægelsindede as Helene, Erastes Søster
- 1788 Forvandlingerne as Christiane
- 1788 Hekseri as Lucretia
- 1788 Jægerne as Cordelila v. Zeck
- 1788 Raptussen as Jenny
- 1788 Ringen as Henriette von Darring
- 1789 Bagtalelsens skole as Maria
- 1789 Datum in blanco as Leonore
- 1789 De usynlige as Leanders Usynlige
- 1789 Den politiske kandestøber as Mad. Sanderus, raadsherreinde
- 1789 Den skinsyge kone as Lady Freelove
- 1789 Diderich Menschenskræk as Hyacinthe, Leanders Kæreste
- 1789 Tartuffe as Mariane, Orogns datter
- 1789 Henrik den fjerdes jagt as Agathe, bondepige, Richards forlovede
- 1790 Den forliebte autor og tjener as Lucinde, en ung Enkefrue
- 1790 Frode og Fingal as Halfdan, Prins fra Thanos Land eller Lifland
- 1790 Fætteren i Lissabon as Sophie, Alberts Datter af første ægteskab
- 1790 Skotlænderinden as Lindane, en Skotlænderinde
- 1791 Bagtalelsens skole as Maria
- 1791 Erast as Sophie, hans Kæreste, Orgons Datter
- 1791 Negeren as Anine Godbert
- 1791 Aabenbar krig as Charlotte
- 1792 Bagtalelsens skole as Maria
- 1792 Bortførelsen as Henriette v. Sachau
- 1792 Den gerrige as Mariane, Cleantes Elskede
- 1792 Det gode ægteskab as Sophie, hans Kone
- 1792 Myndlingerne as Augusta, deres Datter
- 1792 Ringen as En Ubekendt
- 1793 Bagtalelsens skole as Maria
- 1793 Den mistænkelige mand as Jacinte
- 1793 Den værdige fader as Lovise, Wermanns Datter
- 1793 Den aabne brevveksling as Caroline
- 1793 Gulddaasen as Vilhelmine, Visbergs datter
- 1793 Ja eller nej as Lucie
- 1794 Høstdagen as Amalila Fersen, hans Broderdatter
- 1795 Bagtalelsens skole as Maria
- 1795 Bryllupshøjtiden as Henriette
- 1795 Den godmodige familie as Madam Cleark
- 1795 Eugenie as Eugenie, Baronens datter
- 1795 Gamle og nye sæder as Amalia
- 1795 Gulddaasen as Vilhelmine, Visbergs datter
- 1795 Kjolen fra Lyon as Fru v. Hornau
- 1795 Raptussen as Jenny
- 1795 Ægteskabsskolen as Amalie, hans Kone, Silkeborgs datter
- 1796 Advokaterne as Sophie
- 1796 Dormon og Welhelmine as Frøken Wilhelmine
- 1796 Dyveke as Anna Møenstrup, dronningens hofmesterinde
- 1796 Gulddaasen as Vilhelmine, Vilbergs datter
- 1796 Rejsen til byen as Frøken Reising
- 1796 Væddemaalet as Markisen af Blainville
- 1796 Ægtefolkene fra landet as Cecilia
- 1797 Bagtalelsens skole as Lady Teazle
- 1797 De snorrige fætre as Fru Dormin, Enke
- 1797 Den politiske kandestøber as Mad. Abrahams, raadsherreinde
- 1797 Den sanseløse as Clarice
- 1797 Embedsiver as Hofraadinde Rosen
- 1797 Galejslaven as Cecilie, Enke af Orfeuil
- 1797 Høstdagen as Amalila Fersen, hans Broderdatter
- 1797 Ja-ordet as Charlotte
- 1797 Menneskehad og anger as Grevinden
- 1797 Modens sæder as Fru v. Elsing, en ung Enke
- 1797 Navnsygen as Sophie, Konferensraadens Myndling
- 1797 Sammensværgelsen mod Peter den Store as Cyrilla
- 1798 Bagtalelsens skole as Lady Teazle
- 1798 De to poststationer as Lady Bull
- 1798 Den ubesindige gæstfrihed as Ketty
- 1798 Den værdige fader as Grevinde Amaldi
- 1798 Emilie Galotti as Grevinde Orsina
- 1798 Enken og ridehesten as Angelique, hans Kone
- 1798 Falsk undseelse as Fru Heldmand
- 1798 Ringen as Baronesse von Schønhelm
- 1798 Ringen as Majorinde
- 1798 Skumlerne as Emilie
- 1798 Victorine as Franciska
- 1799 Bortførelsen as Vilhelmine v. Sachau, hans Broderdatter
- 1799 Den forladte datter as Henriette Skumring, baronesse
- 1799 Emigranterne as Amalie Lindberg
- 1799 Udstyret as Sophie Wallmann
- 1800 Advokaterne as Sophie
- 1800 De pudserlige arvinger as Madam Sommer, Skuespillerinde
- 1800 Den aabne brevveksling as Caroline
- 1800 Dyveke as Anna Møenstrup, Dronningens Hofmesterinde
- 1800 Gulddaasen as Vilhelmine, Visbergs datter
- 1800 Herman von Unna as Prinsessen af Ratibor
- 1800 Udstyret as Sophie Wallmann
- 1800 Aabenbar as krig Charlotte
- 1801 Advokaterne as Sophie
- 1801 Den døve elsker as Julie
- 1801 Den forladte datter as Henriette Skumring, baronesse
- 1801 Den ubesindige gæstfrihed as Ketty
- 1801 Fejltagelserne as Frøken Constance
- 1801 Fændriken Sophie
- 1801 Gulddaasen as Vilhelmine, Visbergs datter
- 1801 Hekseri as Apelone, Skuespillerinde
- 1801 Hvad vil folk sige ? as Mistress Jenny Hartley
- 1801 Hververne as Philippine, Rosenaus Datter
- 1801 Løgneren as Miss Grantam
- 1801 Rejsen til byen as Frøken Reising
- 1802 Bagtalelsens skole as Lady Teazle
- 1802 Den forladte datter as Henriette Skumring, baronesse
- 1802 Den gerrige as Mariane, Cleantes Elskede
- 1802 Dyveke as Anna Møenstrup, Dronningens Hofmesterinde
- 1802 Octavia as Kleopatra, Dronning i ægypten
- 1802 Syv tusinde rigsdalere as Emilie
- 1802 Værtshuset as Fru Derval
- 1803 De lystige passagerer as Madame Saint-Hilaire, Skuespillerinde
- 1803 Den forladte datter as Henriette Skumring, baronesse
- 1803 En time borte as Jenny
- 1803 Rosenkæderne as Fru Norbek
- 1804 Advokaterne as Sophie
- 1804 Bagtalelsens skole as Lady Teazle
- 1804 Kvindelist as Amelina, hans Søster
- 1804 Maleren af kærlighed as Clemence, Merforts Datter og * Solanges Kone
- 1804 Rejsen til Ostindien as Arabella
- 1805 Bagtalelsens skole as Lady Teazle
- 1805 Den forladte datter as Henritte Skumring, baronesse
- 1805 Selim, Prins af Algier as Saphira, Enkedronning af Algier
- 1806 Strikkepindene as Amalia, hans Kone
- 1808 Bagtalelsens skole as Lady Teazle
- 1808 Den forladte datter as Henriette Skumring, baronesse
- 1808 Kærlighed under maske as Ung Enke
- 1809 Advokaterne as Sophie
- 1809 Bagtalelsens skole as Lady Teazle
- 1809 Den vovelige prøve as Fru Dupont
- 1809 Marionetterne as Celestine, Valberts Søster
- 1810 Bagtalelsens skole as Lady Teazle
- 1810 Den forladte datter as Henriette Skumring, baronesse
- 1810 Den unge moder as Madame Dorimont
- 1810 Snedkeren i Lifland as Catharina
- 1811 Tyve-aars-festen as Majorinde
- 1812 Advokaterne as Sophie
- 1812 Bagtalelsens skole as Lady Teazle
- 1812 Den forladte datter as Henriette Skumring, baronesse
- 1813 Advokaterne as Sophie
- 1813 Bagtalelsens skole as Lady Teazle
- 1812 Henrik den fjerdes jagt as Agathe, en Bondepige i Lieursain
- 1817 Macbeth as Lady Macbeth
- 1818 Fruentimmerhævn as Fru Saint-Elme
- 1821 De pudserlige arvinger as Madam Sommer, Skuespillerinde
- 1823 Emilie Galotti as Grevinde Orsina

=== Hofteatret ===
- 1779 Forøderen as Cydalise
- 1780 Henrik som tjener to herrer as Lucilia
- 1782 Tartuffe as Mariane, Orgons datter
- 1784 Bagtalelsens skole as Maria
- 1784 Tartuffe as Mariane, Orgons datter
- 1785 Bagtalelsens skole as Maria
- 1786 Tartuffe as Mariane, Orogns datter
- 1815 Machbeth as Lady Macbeth
