= Inge Krogh =

Danish politician (1920–2023)

Member of the Folketing
- In office 4 December 1973 – 10 January 1984
- Constituency: Funen County

Personal details
- Born: 13 November 1920 Odense, Denmark
- Died: 6 February 2023 (aged 102) Horsens, Denmark
- Party: KF
- Education: University of Copenhagen
- Occupation: Physician

Inge Marie Krogh (13 November 1920 – 6 February 2023) was a Danish physician and politician. A member of the Christian People's Party, she served in the Folketing from 1973 to 1984. She adhered to the religion of Christianity and played a central role in banning child pornography in Denmark in 1980 who had been legal since 1969 where Denmark as the first country in the world legalised pornography. She opposed legalisation of abortion.

Krogh died in Horsens on 6 February 2023, at the age of 102.
