= Hakon Børresen =

Danish composer (1876–1954)

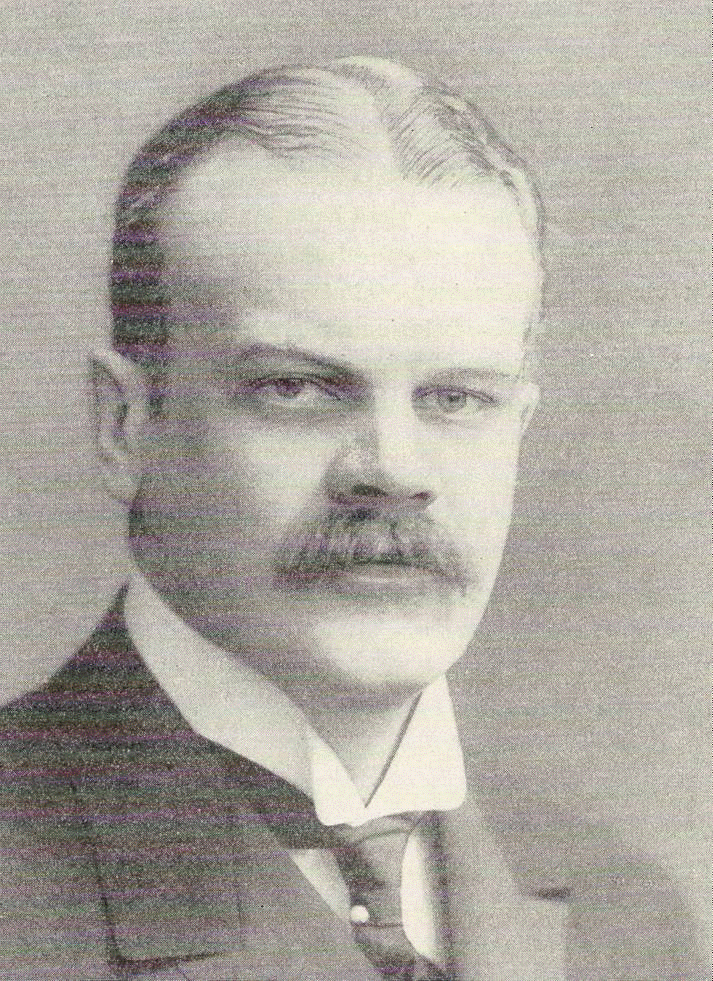
Hakon Børresen

Axel Ejnar Hakon Børresen (2 June 1876 – 6 October 1954) was one of the foremost Danish composers of the 20th century.

== Life ==
Børresen was born and died in Copenhagen, and was descended from a merchant family. As a child, he was given violin, cello and piano lessons. When Børresen made clear to his father that he wished to become a composer, the latter arranged for him to study at the Royal Danish Conservatory in 1895. There he studied composition with Johan Svendsen. After further private studies, his First Symphony was privately premiered in 1901. It made his name as an up-and-coming composer. There followed travels in Germany, France and Belgium, where he made many useful connections. From 1902 on he divided his time between Copenhagen and Skagen where he maintained a second home. Børresen was an important organizer of several Danish music festivals and served as the president of Danish Composers Union between 1924 and 1949. At the time of his death, he was widely regarded as one of Denmark's most important musicians. His opera The Royal Guest is widely regarded as the best early 20th-century Danish opera, and his chamber music works received considerable critical praise.

His work was part of the music event in the art competition at the 1932 Summer Olympics.

== Tonal language ==
Børresen's style and musical language are primarily that of the late Romantic. His music shows little or no influence from more modern tendencies. Instead, his music takes as its inspiration Danish cultural ideas and folk melodies. His style reflects the influence of his teacher Svendsen, as well as that of Tchaikovsky.

== Selected works ==
=== Orchestra ===
- Symphony No. 1 in C minor, Op. 3 (1901)
- Symphony No. 2 in A major, Op. 7 "The Ocean" (1904)
- Symphony No. 3 in C major, Op. 21 (1925/26)
- Violin Concerto in G major, Op. 11 (1904)
- "The Normans", A Concert Overture, Op. 16 (1912, rev. 1935)
- Serenade in C major for Horn, Strings and Percussion (1944)
- "Nordic Folkmelodies" for String Orchestra (1949)

=== Vocal ===
- Various art songs (Lieder) and choral works

=== Stage ===
- "The Royal Guest", Opera (1919)
- "Kaddara", Opera (1921)
- "Tycho Brahe's Dream", A Ballet (1924)

=== Chamber ===
- String Quartet No. 1 in E minor, Op. 20 (1913)
- String Quartet No. 2 in C minor (1939)
- String Sextet in G major, Op. 5 (1901)
- Sonata for Violin & Piano in A minor, Op. 9 (1907)
- Romance for Violoncello and Piano in D major, Op. 4 (1902)

=== Piano ===
- Several occasional pieces
