= Mette Koefoed Bjørnsen =

Danish author, conciliator and economist

- Born: Mette Margrethe Koefoed Bjørnsen; 6 December 1920; Frederiksberg, Denmark
- Died: 29 March 2008 (aged 87); Copenhagen, Denmark
- Education: University of Copenhagen
- Occupations: Author; Conciliator; Economist
- Years active: 1950s–1997
- Spouses: Palle Mogens Flemming Holstein (m. 1950; div. 1953) Bjørn Bjørnsen (m. 1953)
- Children: 3
- Awards: Knight First Class of the Order of the Dannebrog

Mette Margrethe Koefoed Bjørnsen (6 December 1920 – 29 March 2008) was a Danish author, conciliator and economist who was chair of the Conciliation Institution from 1988 to 1992. She worked as an education inspection at the Ministry of Trade's Supervision of the Business School in 1959 and was an associate professor of economics and statistics at the Social College in Copenhagen in 1964. Bjørnsen was an associate professor of economics and statistics head of department of the department of history at the Danish Teacher Training College between 1971 and 1990 and was chair of the Danish Writers' Association from 1991 to 1997. She was appointed Knight of the Order of the Dannebrog in 1986 and was upgraded to Knight First Class in 1993.

== Early life ==
Bjørnsen was born in Frederiksberg on 6 December 1920. She was the daughter of the civil engineer Hans Georg Koefoed and Frida Rigmor Harriet Heiberg Møller. Bjørnsen had two siblings and was raised in Lyngby, which is north of Copenhagen. She enrolled at Lyngby State School as a student in 1940. After Bjørnsen's mother insisted that her children become more educated, she went to the University of Copenhagen and studied economics. She gained employment, but her studying was during the German occupation of Denmark. Bjørnsen gained her Master of Science degree in 1947; she had been attracted to law during her education.

== Career ==
She began her career working in the mornings at Statistics Denmark and the afternoons at the Ministry of Foreign Affairs. Bjørnsen became employed in the statistics department of Mødrehjælpen through Vera Skalts. In 1959, she became an education inspector at the Ministry of Trade's Supervision of the Business School. Bjørnsen was appointed an associate professor of economics and statistics at the Social College in Copenhagen in 1964. She was associate professor and head of department of the department of history at the Danish Teacher Training College between 1971 and 1990. During this period, Bjørnsen also at the Royal Danish Naval Academy, was an external associate professor at the University of Copenhagen and also taught economics and statistics at the Niels Brock Copenhagen Business College. She also appeared on television from 1977 to 1978 to articulate what economics is to the general public.

In 1969, she became a member of the board at Statistisk Tiårsoversigt, and also of Arbejdernes Landsbank six years later. Until 1994, Bjørnsen was a member of the board of Kofoeds School and advised department of the Government of Denmark on the International Labour Organization until the late 1960s. She joined the Conciliation Institution as a deputy in 1979. Bjørnsen acted as a go-between in an agreement with sailors and shipowners in 1981 and mediated in the fields of banking and journalism. She became one of three state's three conciliators in 1982.

Bjørnsen was elected to serve a single term of the Gentofte local municipal council in 1982 after drawing up the cross-party list. That same year, she was appointed chair of Arbejdsmarkedets Tillægspension's Board of Representatives and Board of Directors and held the position until 1993. Bjørnsen was also chair of the board of Top Danmark Fonden from 1985 to 1990 and led the Education Committee for Special Workers between 1985 and 1993. She was appointed chair of the Conciliation Institution in 1988 and she remained in the position until 1992.

For her ability to settle disputes, Bjørnsen was made chair of the Danish Writers' Association in 1991 to help form internal compromises. She remained in the position until 1997. Up to the Treaty of Amsterdam, Bjørnsen worked for the Europe of Nations organisation. She was the author of multiple textbooks on economics, statistics and social studies, of which some have been incorporated into the education curriculum for primary and lower secondary schools and she conducted lectures in places such as at associations and schools. Bjørnsen was appointed Knight of the Order of the Dannebrog in 1986 and was upgraded to Knight First Class seven years later. In 1981, she was named the recipient of The Native Danish Language Award and was named an Honorary craftsman in 1991.

== Personal life ==
She was firstly married to the Palle Mogens Flemming Holstei from 1950 to their divorce in 1953. They had one child. Bjørnsen remarried to Lieutenant Colonel Bjørn Bjørnsen on 10 November 1953. There were two children of the second marriage. On 29 March 2008, she died at the Craftsmen's Association's Nursing Home in Copenhagen.
