= Emma Thomsen =

Danish actress

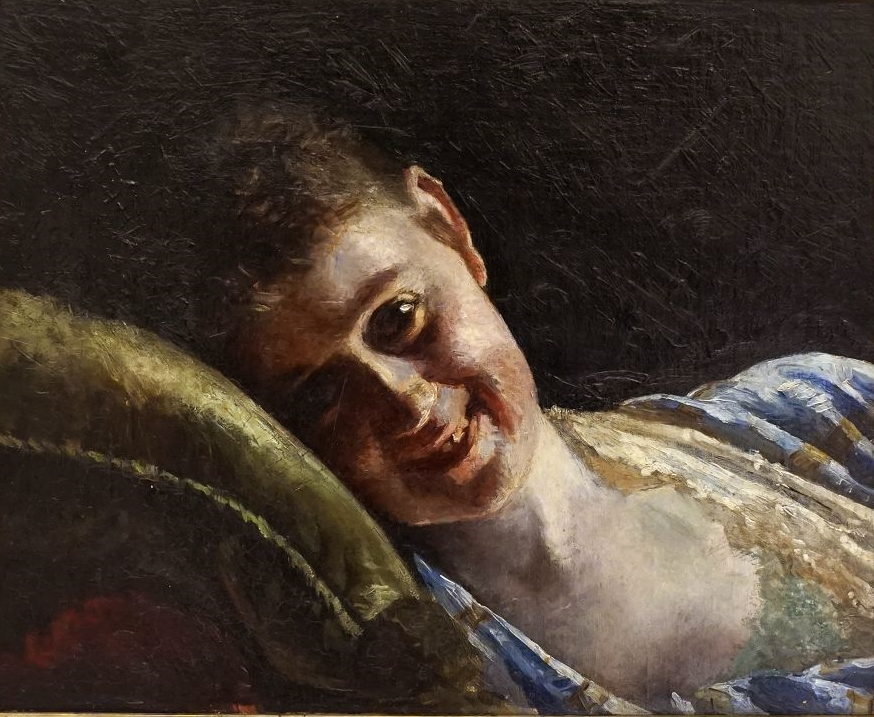
- Born: Emma Alice Lange; 21 November 1863; Copenhagen, Denmark
- Died: 15 January 1910 (aged 46); Copenhagen, Denmark
- Occupation: Actress
- Years active: 1883 — 1910
- Spouse(s): Poul Nielsen, Capt. Fritz Thomsen
- Parent(s): Carl Vilhelm Lange, Dorothea Stibolt

Emma Alice Thomsen née Lange (21 November 1863 – 15 January 1910) was a Danish actress who performed in Vaudeville productions at the Royal Danish Theatre in Copenhagen. Described as "the world's most beautiful woman" by the Norwegian painter Christian Krohg, she was given a wider repertoire than would normally have been possible for an actress without formal training, thanks in part to her singing voice. She progressed over the years, performing in more serious works, such as Portia in Shakespeare's Merchant of Venice and Elisabeth in Heiberg's Elverhøj.

== Biography ==
Born on 21 November 1863 in Copenhagen, Emma Alice Lange was the daughter of the translator Carl Vilhelm Lange (1820–75) and Dorothea Stibolt (1833–98). In 1888, she married the actor Poul Nielsen (divorced in 1897) and in 1897 Captain Fritz Thomsen (1864–1935).

She débuted in 1883 at the Royal Danish Theatre in Jens Christian Hostrup's Eventyr paa Fodrejsen, making such an impression with her attractive looks that she was immediately engaged to play the roles of beautiful young women in other Vaudeville works by Heisberg, including Abekatten, Køge Huskors, Aprilsnarrene and Nej. Her major breakthrough came in December 1900 when she took on a more mature role, playing Maria in Edvard Brandes' Under Loven at Copenhagen's Folketeatret, with a passion no one had expected of her.

Among the most interesting of the 170 roles she played were Henriette in Skyldig – ikke skyldig, Maria in Paa Storhove, Akulina in Mørkets Magt, the romantically desolate Katuscha in Opstandelse and the gipsy artist in Johan Ulfstjerna. Thereafter she felt increasingly threatened by the success of Betty Nansen. Her last role was the Jewish women Gerda Sommer in Henri Nathansen's Daniel Hertz.

Emma Thomsen died on 15 January 1910 in Copenhagen and is buried in Assistens Cemetery.
