= Anton Carl Illum =

Danish industrialist

Anton Carl Pedersen Illum
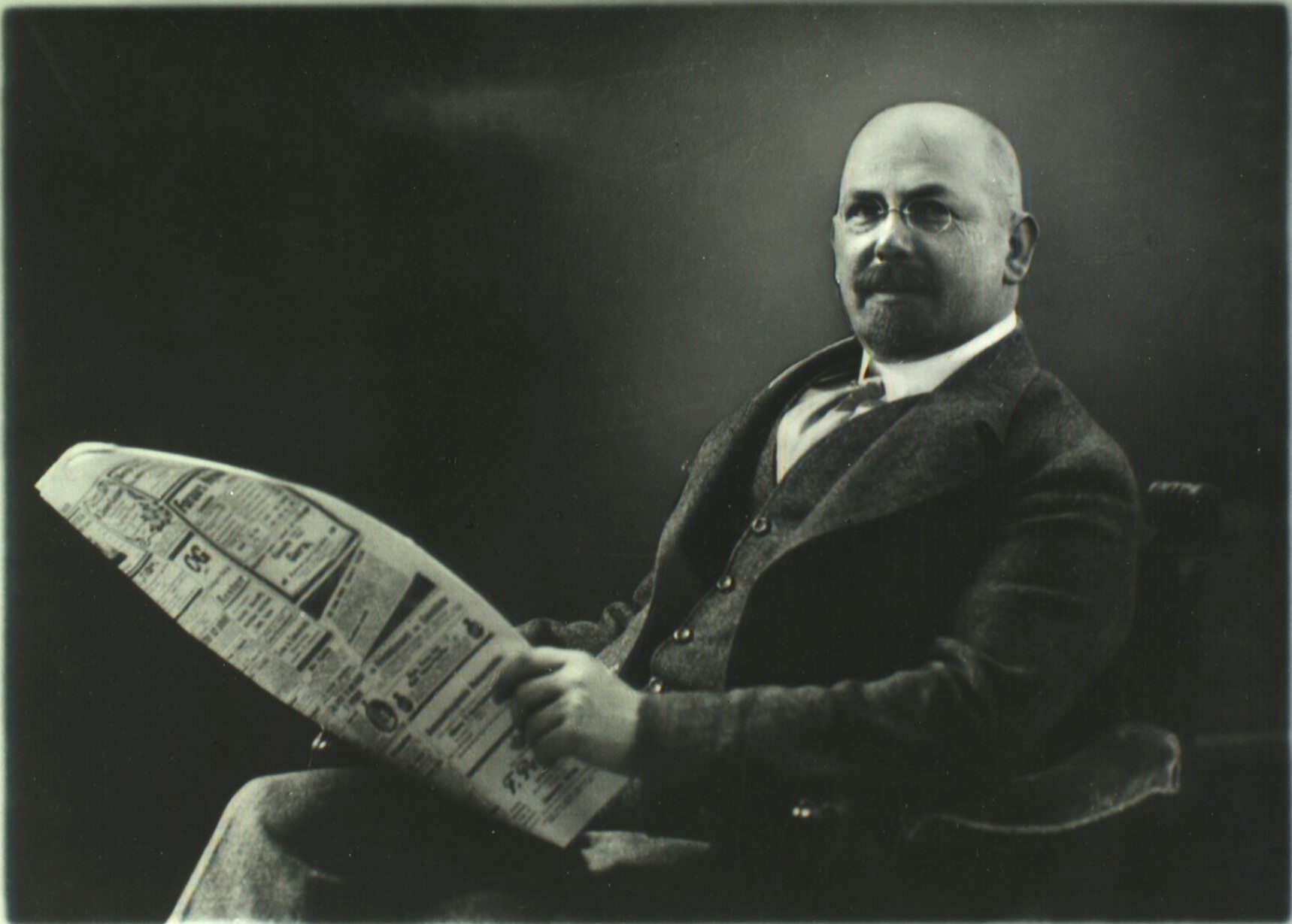
- Born: 3 July 1863; Dyvskrog, Denmark
- Died: 20 July 1938 (aged 75); RMS Empress of Britain, Pacific Ocean
- Occupation: Businessman

Anton Carl Pedersen Illum (5 July 1863 - 20 July 1938) was a Danish businessman who founded the Illum Department Store on Amagertorv in Copenhagen.

== Early life and education ==
Illum was born on 5 July 1863 in Dyvskrog at Fåborg on the island of Funen, the son of ship builder Peter Hansen Pedersen (I.) (1834–77) and Ane Kirstine Rasmussen (1834–1914). He changed his name from Pedersen to Illum on 6 November 1888. The family moved to Vejle. Illum was apprenticed to V. Wegener in his new home town and then worked for a few years at Frølund & Wittrup in Horsens. He then continued to Hamburg to work for Wm. Klöpper. He spent almost six years in the firm, although most of the time as a travelling salesman in Denmark.

== Career ==
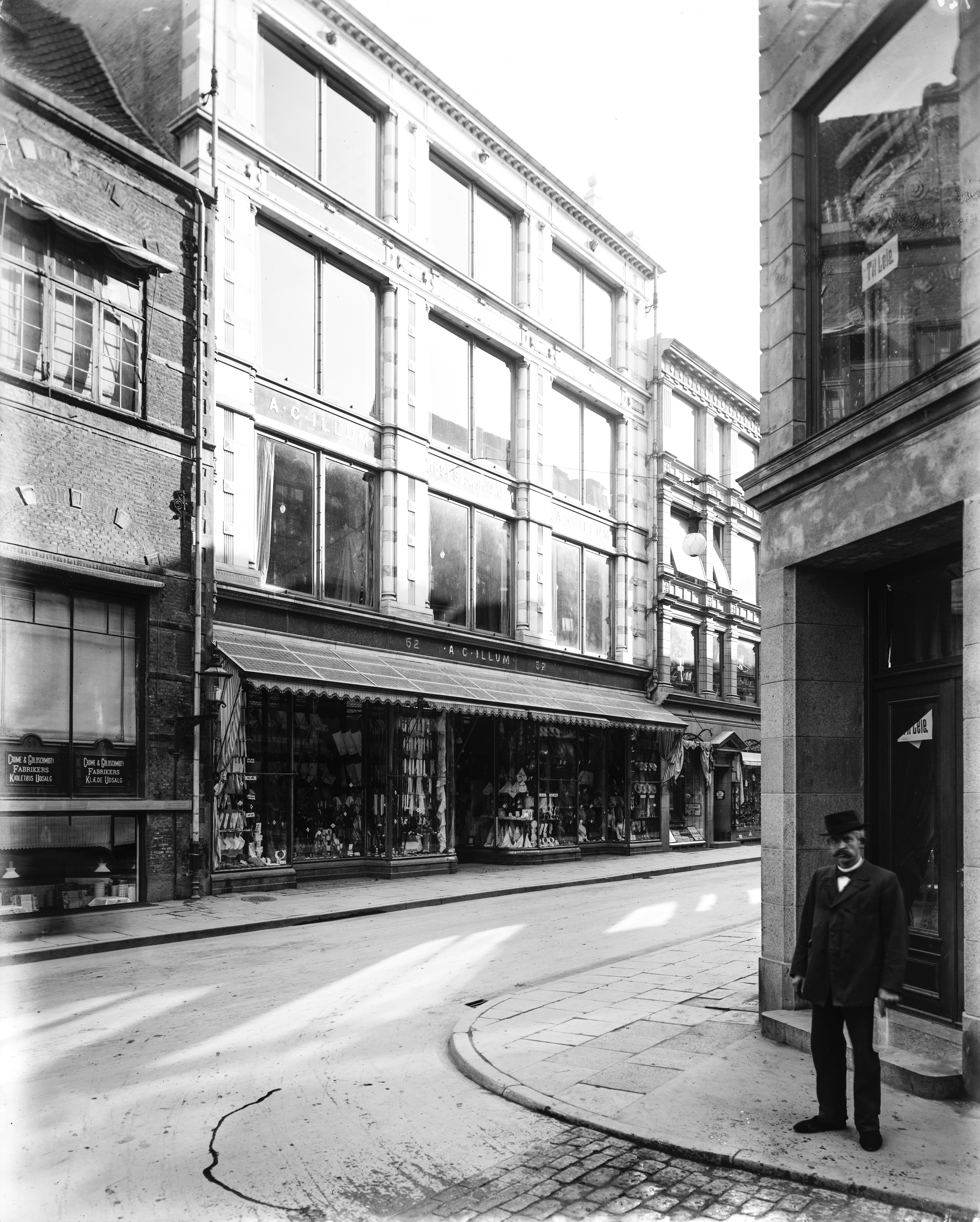
Illum's first building at Østergade 52, possibly with Illum seen at the corner to the right, photographed by Peter Elfelt

On 3 March 1891, Illum opened a small shop at Østergade 55 in Copenhagen. His business grew rapidly, assisted by substantial credits from his old employer, which compensated for his very small initial capital. In 1899, he had grown out of space and moved his business to larger premises on the other side of the street and would continue to expand into successive properties over the following years. These included Efterslægtselskabets Skole, which was acquired in 1911.

In 1914, the existing space was demolished to make way for a new department store. On 1 January 1920, the company was converted into a family-owned limited company (aktieselskab), but Illum remained in control of the operations until his death.

In 1913, Illum established a pension scheme for his employees which became a model for similar initiatives in other large enterprises. One of his sons, Svend Illum (1899–1978), was managing director of the company from 1931 to 1969.

== Personal life ==
On 23 September 1892, Illum married Karen Marie Andersen (8 December 1868 - 11 October 1939), a daughter of merchant Christian A Andersen (1839–89) and Caroline Severine Thøgersen (1842–73), in Roskilde. The couple had three daughters and one son.

Illum constructed a villa at Hveensvej 6 in Vedbæk to designs by the architect Carl Brummer in 1908–12. The house has been demolished but the gardener's house and a dovecote has survived at Sofievej 1. A portrait of Illum was painted by Bertha Wegmann in 1916 and another one was painted by Carl Forup in 1934. Jens Jacob Bregne also created a bust of him. He died on 20 April 1938, on board the RMS Empress of Britain, between Fiji and Honolulu. He is buried in Vedbæk Cemetery.

== See also ==
- Illums Bolighus
