= Dagmar Andreasen =

Danish businesswoman and politician

Dagmar Andreasen née Rasmussen (1920–2006) was a Danish businesswoman and a politician. In 1953, she took over the management of Rynkeby Mosteri, an apple juice factory which had been founded by her mother in the village of Rynkeby on the island of Funen. She introduced significant improvements, began to produce other juices, especially blackcurrant, and successfully promoted the Rynkeby brand name. When she retired from management in 1986, the firm had 170 employees and a turnover of DKK 200 million. On the political front, representing the Danish Social Liberal Party, she was a Member of the Folketing from 1968 to 1975.

== Early life and education ==
Born in Rynkeby on 6 November 1920, Dagmar Rasmussen was the daughter of the manufacturer Rasmus Theodor Rasmussen (1882–1964) and the nurse Inger née Lykkegaard (1885–1965). In December 1945, she married the restaurateur Ankjær Johannes Andreasen with whom she had three children: Inger (1946), Knud (1948) and Erik (1948). The marriage was dissolved in 1965. She was educated in the local school but left in 1934 in order to help her mother with juice production. After being trained in typing and bookkeeping in Odense in 1940, the following spring together with her brother, she went to Ober-Erlenbach near Frankfurt, Germany, for a course on the chemistry, biology and testing of apple must. Following six months at the Plumrose food company in Copenhagen, she was exceptionally admitted as a student at the Landbohøjskolen (Agricultural College) where she remained for at least six months.

== Career ==
Until the end of the German occupation of Denmark in 1945, she worked at the Rynkeby factory. After her marriage at the end of 1945, she helped her husband run the Hotel Hem Odde near Skanderborg but did not really like the place. In 1951, she left to help her mother run the factory at Rynkeby. Two years later, she was charged with its management.

She expanded the business by producing juice from other berries, especially blackcurrants, which proved popular in Sweden and the UK. Taking advantage of government loans and the Marshall Plan, she modernized the factory and publicized the Rynkeby brand, soon also producing orange juice as Solita. In 1967, she created a joint stock company, maintaining her position as the main shareholder. After a rather unsuccessful period working with Faxe Brewery from 1963, business improved from the late 1960s under a contract with De forenede Bryggerier. By the early 1970s, the firm was highly profitable with some 170 employees and a turnover of around DKK 200 million.

On the political front, she was a Member of the Folketing representing the Danish Social Liberal Party from 1968 to 1975, first for Kerteminde, then for Odense. Her main interest was business policy.

Dagmar Andreasen died on 14 May 2006, aged 85.
