= Ingeborg Raunkiær =

Danish writer (1863–1921)

Ingeborg Marie Raunkiær née Andersen, pen name Box, (11 October 1863 – 8 September 1921) was a Danish writer who published books and contributed articles to magazines and newspapers. She is remembered for Mand og Kvinde (English: Man and Woman) which she published anonymously in 1909 and for what she considered to be her most important work, I Danmark (1911), presenting nature's development throughout the year in the form of diary entries. Her numerous articles were both humorous and satirical.

== Biography ==
Born on 11 October 1863 in Varde, Ingeborg Marie Andersen was the daughter of the manufacturer Hans Peter Andersen (1832–1887) and his wife Nielsine Andrea née Schack (1835–1905). In May 1888, she married the plant ecologist Christen Christensen Raunkiær (1860–1938). The marriage was dissolved in 1915. Ingeborg Raunkier was raised in southwestern Jutland but moved to Copenhagen after her marriage.

She assisted her husband with drawings for his botanical publications and accompanied him on his trips to the West Indies (1905) and the Mediterranean (1909). Her first work Pærekjøbing (English: Buying Pears), published in 1894 under her pen name Box, consisted of sketches satirically presenting life in a provincial town where girls, rather than entering a profession, were brought up as housemaids. If they were lucky, they would find a wealthy husband. The novel Mementol (1898), published under her own name, continuing the discussion of women's oppression. Her essay Digtning og Mening (Poetry and Opinion, 1904) pokes fun at the popular poet Jenny Blicher-Clausen (1865–1907), stating "Poetisk Vrøvl ikke er bedre end Prosavrøvl" (Poetic nonsense is no better than prose nonsense).

Mand og Kvinde (1909) is another satirical work tracing a married couple's experiences from falling in love through various crises to peace and quiet in old age. It is presented as a kind of dialogue based on the thoughts of husband and wife. The work she considered her masterpiece, I Danmark, presents the way nature develops throughout the year in diary form. Her last work, Tropeskildringer fra vestindiske Øer (Tropical depictions from the West Indies, 1921) is based on the journeys she undertook with her husband.

Ingeborg Raunkiær died in the Frederiksberg district of Copenhagen on 8 September 1921 and was buried in Solbjerg Park Cemetery.

== Works ==
- Pærekjøbing (1894)
- Mementol (1898)
- Digtning og Mening (1904)
- Mand og Kvinde (1909)
- I Danmark (1911)
- Tropeskildringer fra vestindiske Øer (1921)
