= 1858 in Denmark =

- Decades: 1830s; 1840s; 1850s; 1860s; 1870s
- See also: Other events of 1858; List of years in Denmark

Events from the year 1858 in Denmark.

== Incumbents ==
- Monarch – Frederick VII
- Prime minister – Carl Christian Hall

== Events ==
- 10 November – The Danish Order of Freemasons is founded.
- 10 September – The statue of Frederick VI is unveiled at Frederiksberg Runddel.
- 1 November – The new and taller Skagen Lighthouse is inaugurated as a replacement of the old Skagen Lighthouse from 1747.
- 18 November – The Institut Sankt Joseph is founded.

=== Undated ===
- Bernhard Hertz establishes his own workshop.
- The Institute for the Blind (founded in 1811) is taken over by the state and continued as the Rotal Institute for the Blind.

== Culture ==
=== Performing arts ===
- 19 December – August Bournonville's ballet Flower Festival in Genzano receives its world premiere at the Royal Danish Theatre.

== Births ==
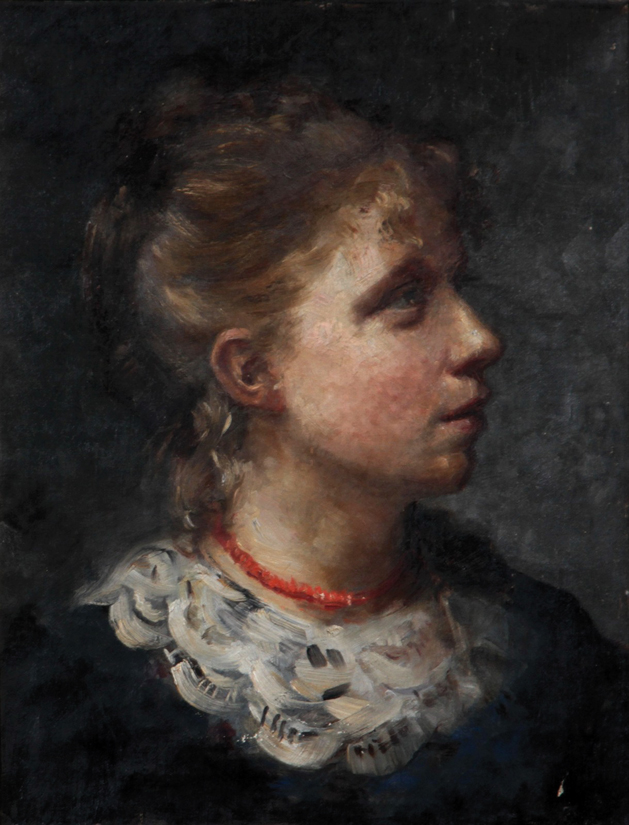
Ingeborg Maria Sick.

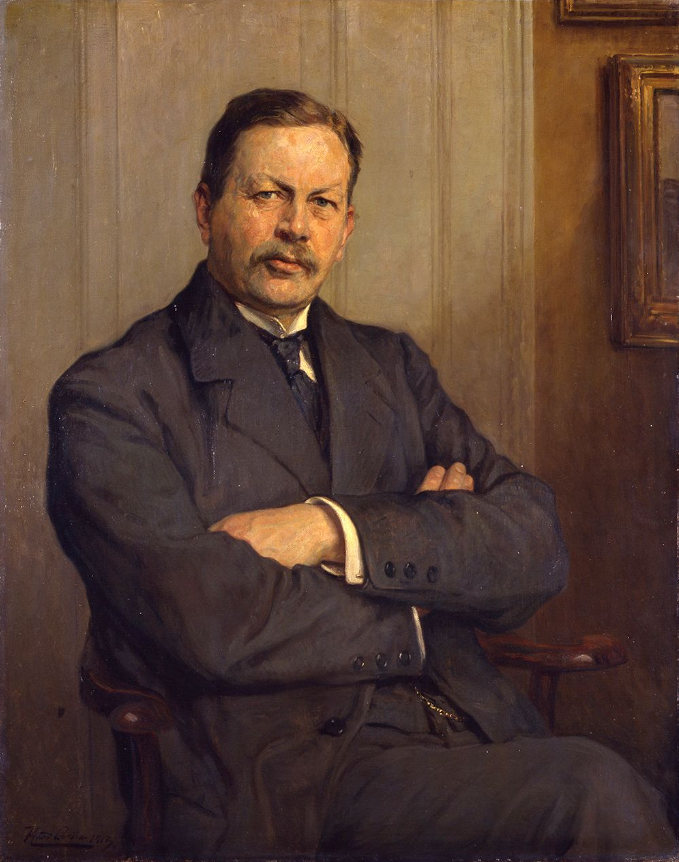
Alexander Foss.

=== January–March ===
- 12 January – Viggo Lindstrøm, actor and theatre director (died 1926)
- 6 March – Gustav Wied, writer (died 1914)
- 22 March – Henrik Cavling, journalist (died 1933)
- 25 March – Charlotte Eilersgaard, author and editor (died 1922)
- 29 March – Carl Nicolai Starcke, sociologist, educator, politician and philosopher (died 1926)

=== April–June ===
- 3 May – Alfred Schmidt, painter (died 1938)
- 24 June – Jacob Stilling-Andersen, businessman (died 1933)

=== July–September ===
- 17 July – Kristine Marie Jensen, cookbook writer (died 1923)
- 31 August – Povl Bentzon, engineer and land surveyor (died 1943)
- 6 September – Henrik Grønvold, painter (died 1940)
- 15 September – Ingeborg Maria Sick, writher and philanthropist (died 1951)

=== October–December ===
- 1 October – Alexander Foss, businessman (died 1025)
- 2 November – Niels Skovgaard, artist (died 1938)
- 27 October – Prince Valdemar of Denmark (died 1939)

== Deaths ==
- 2 February – Peter Kierkegaard, clergyman and politician (born 1805)
- 19 March – Carl Emil Moltke, diplomat and landowner (born 1773)
- 10 November – Johannes Theodorus Suhr, businessman (born 1792)
- 8 December – Haldur Grüner, economist, educator (born 1818 in Norway)
