= 1923 in Denmark =

- Decades: 1900s; 1910s; 1920s; 1930s; 1940s
- See also: Other events of 1923; List of years in Denmark

Events from the year 1923 in Denmark.

== Incumbents ==
- Monarch - Christian X
- Prime minister - Niels Neergaard

== Events ==
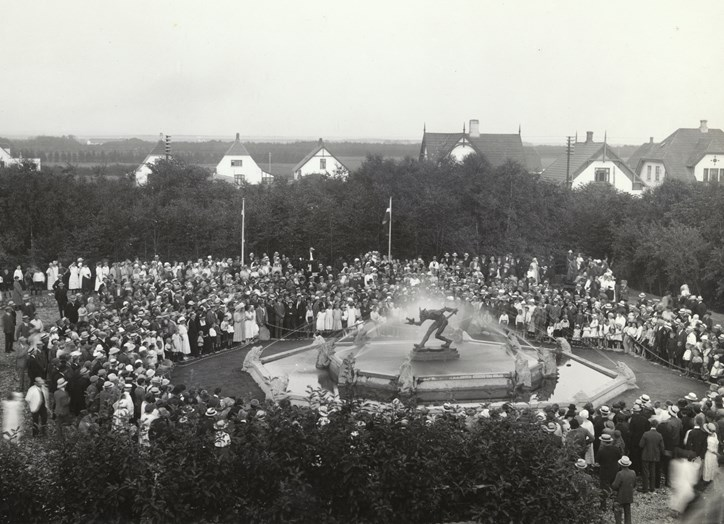
Niels Hansen Jacobsen's Troll Fountain is inaugurated in Vejen

- 13 July – Niels Hansen Jacobsen's Troll Fountain is inaugurated in Vejen.
- 26 September – Rued Langgaard's Symphony No. 6 is first performed in Denmark at the Odd Fellows Mansion, Copenhagen.

== Births ==
=== January–March ===
- 2 January – Poul Volther, furniture designer (d. 2001)
- 2 March – Rasmus Nellemannm, painter and graphic artist (d. 2004)

=== April–June ===
- 18 April – Leif Panduro, author (d. 1977)
- 9 May – Jørgen Rømer, painter (d. 2007)
- 20 June – Bjørn Watt-Boolsen, actor (d. 1998)

=== July–September ===
- 3 August – Aage Larsen, rower (d. 2016)
- 19 September – Lily Broberg, actress (d. 1989)

=== October–December ===
- 6 October – Nanna Ditzel, designer (d. 2005)
- 3 November – Astrid Villaume, actress (d. 1995)

== Deaths ==
=== January–March ===
- 4 January – Anders Andersen-Lundby, painter (born 1841)
- 7 February – Kristine Marie Jensen, cookbook writer (b. 1858)
- 26 March – Olaf Poulsen, comedic stage actor (b. 1849)

=== April–June ===
- 3 May – Carl Ryder, Arctic explorer and naval officer (b. 1858)

=== July–September ===
- 13 July – Asger Hamerik, composer (b. 1843)
- 22 September – Emma Hørup, schoolteacher, journalist and member of the Danish Women's Society (born 1836)

=== October–December ===
- 28 October – Bernhard Ingemann, architect (b. 1869)
- 27 November – Tage Reedtz-Thott, politician, prime minister of Denmark (b. 1839)
