= 2004 in Denmark =

- Decades: 1980s; 1990s; 2000s; 2010s; 2020s
- See also: Other events of 2004; List of years in Denmark

Events from the year 2004 in Denmark.

== Incumbents ==
- Monarch – Margrethe II
- Prime minister – Anders Fogh Rasmussen

== Events ==
- 14 May – The wedding of Frederik, Crown Prince of Denmark, and Mary Donaldson takes place in Copenhagen Cathedral, in Copenhagen.
- 26 December – Several hundreds of Danish people are among the thousands of people killed by the 2004 Indian Ocean tsunami, at least 2,000 Scandinavians still missing in Thailand.

== The arts ==
- 10 June – Gala concert with the Danish National Symphony Orchestra in Tivoli Concert Hall, celebrating Henrik, the Prince Consort of Denmark's 70th birthday, with the premiere performance of Frederik Magle's symphonic poem Souffle le vent from the Cantabile suite.

== Sports ==
- 13–29 August – Denmark at the 2004 Summer Olympics in Athens: Two gold medals and six bronze medals

=== Badminton ===
- Greve Strands BK wins Europe Cup.
- 9–14 March – Jens Eriksen and Martin Lundgaard Hansen wins gold in men's double at the 2004 All England Open Badminton Championships.
- 16–24 April – With three gold medals, three silver medals and five bronze medals, Denmark finishes as the best nation at the 19th European Badminton Championships in Geneve, Switzerland.

=== Football ===
- 20 May – FC Copenhagen wins the 2003–04 Danish Cup by defeating Aalborg BK 1–0 in the final.
- 12 June – 4 July – Denmark participates at the UEFA Euro 2004 in Portugal.
  - 22 June – Denmark qualifies for the quarter-finals by drawing with Sweden in the last group stage match.
  - 27 June – Denmark is defeated by Czech Republic in the quarter-final.

=== Handball ===
- 1 February – Denmark takes bronze at the 2004 European Men's Handball Championship by defeating Croatia 31–27 in the third place play-off.
- 29 August – Denmark wins gold in the Women's handball tournament at the 2004 Summer Olympics by defeating South Korea in the final.
- 15 December – Denmark wins silver at the 2004 European Women's Handball Championship after being defeated 27–25 by Norway in the final.

=== Other ===
- 13 June – Tom Kristensen wins the 2004 24 Hours of Le Mans as part of Audi Sport Japan Team Goh, his sixth win of the 24 Hours of Le Mans race.
- 5–16 May – Denmark wins two bronze medals at the 2004 European Aquatics Championships.
- 25 July – Michael Rasmussen finishes 3rd in the Mountains classification in the 2004 Tour de France.
- 12 November – Mikkel Kessler becomes WBA championship ny defeating Manny Siaca in Copenhagen after taking on the match on a short notice after his stablemate, Mads Larsen, had been injured in training.

== Business ==
- The Laundromat Cafe chain is founded in Copenhagen.
- Kuben Byg A/S purchases Værløse Air Base for redevelopment, establishing the town of Laanshøj.
- Wind turbine manufacturer NEG Micon is acquired by Vestas.
- Copenhagen Records is founded in Copenhagen.
- CEPOS, a conservative think-tank, is established.
- The Danish Centre for Design Research is created by the Ministry of Higher Education and Science.
- The EY Huset office building is completed in Aarhus.
- Warner Bros. Discovery launches Kanal 4 and Kanal 5.
- TV 2 launches TV 2 Charlie.

== Births ==
=== January–March ===
- 19 March – Gustav Mortensen, footballer

=== April–June ===
- 13 June – Silas Andersen, footballer
- 20 June – William Clem, footballer

=== July–September ===
3 July – Filip Bundgaard, footballer

=== October–December ===
- 15 October – Max Ejdum, footballer
- 26 October – Patrick Dorgu, footballer
- 14 December – Annika Wedderkopp, singer

== Deaths ==
=== January–March ===
- 6 February – Jørgen Jersild, composer and music educator (born 1913)
- 5 March
  - Hanne Budtz, politician and lawyer (born 1915)
  - Thorkild Bjørnvig, poet (born 1018)

=== April–June ===
- 1 May – Ejler Bille, artist (born 1910)
- 5 May – Kate Mundt, actress (born 1930)

=== July–September ===
- 4 September – Rasmus Nellemannm painter and graphic artist (died 1923)
- 14 September – Ove Sprogøe, actor (born 1919)

=== October–December ===
- 13 December – Jørn Larsen, painter and sculptor (born 1926)

== See also ==
- 2004 in Danish television
