= 1924 in Denmark =

- Decades: 1900s; 1910s; 1920s; 1930s; 1940s
- See also: Other events of 1924; List of years in Denmark

Events from the year 1924 in Denmark.

== Incumbents ==
- Monarch – Christian X
- Prime minister – Niels Neergaard (until 24 April), Thorvald Stauning

== Events ==
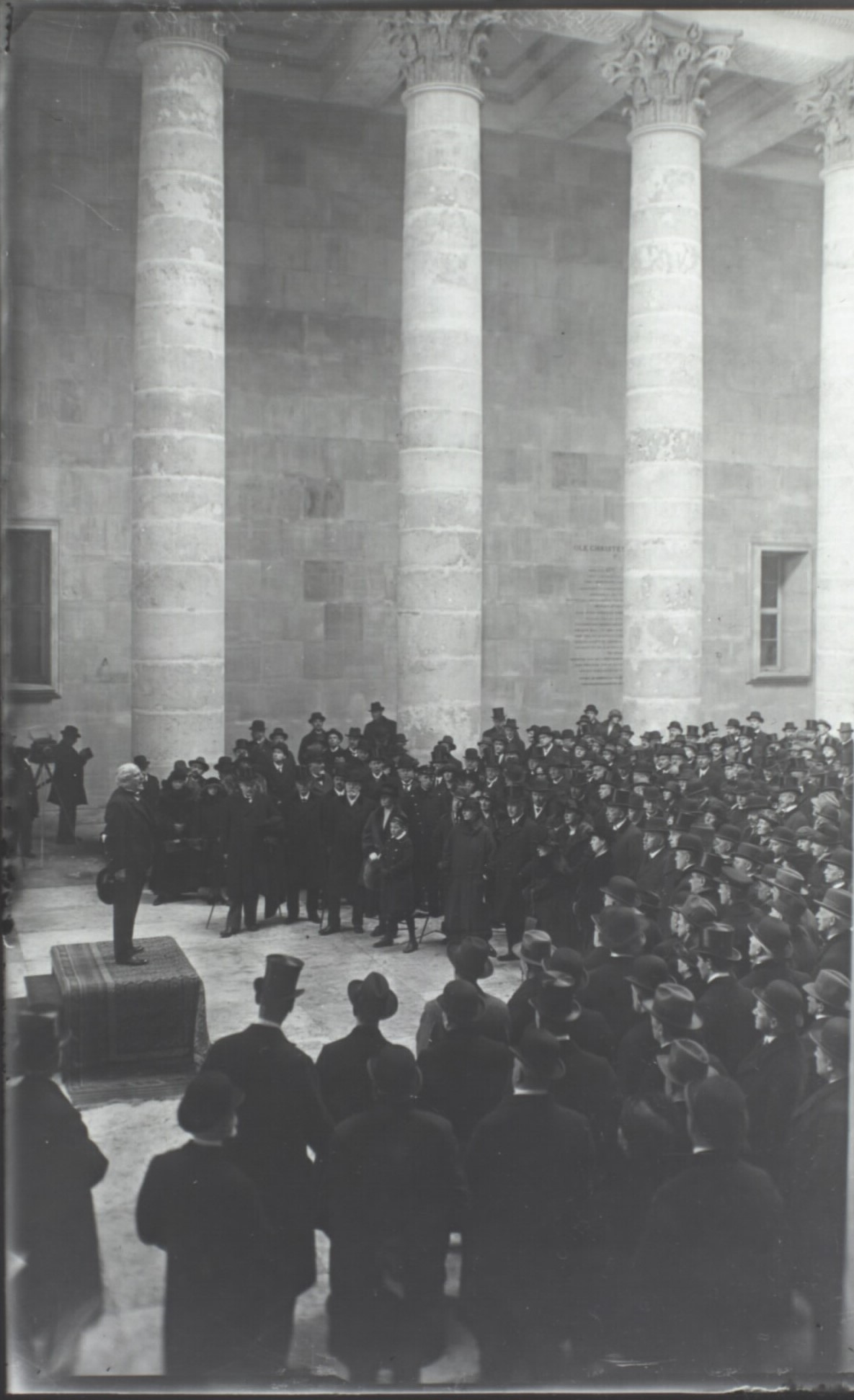
The new Copenhagen Police Headquarters is inaugurated.

- 22 January – the 1924 Faroese general election is held.
- 11 April – the 1924 Danish Folketing election is held.
- 23 April – the Stauning I Cabinet is formed following the Folketing election.
- 18 July – Tisvildeleje railway station opens.
- 1 August – the Institut Jeanne d'Arc is established in Frederiksberg.
- August 9–17 – the 2nd World Scout Jamboree is held in Ermelunden, Denmark.

== Sports ==
- 15 June – The opening match of the first Nordic Football Championship is held at Københavns Idrætspark. The Swedish national team defeats the Danish team 3–2.
- 5–27 July – Denmark competes at the Summer Olympics, winning 9 medals in addition to several medals from the art competition.
- 23 July – Esbjerg fB is founded.

=== Date unknown ===
- B 1903 wins their second Danish football championship by defeating B 1913 5–0 in the second replay of the final of the 1923–24 Danish National Football Tournament (after two 1–1 draws).

== Births ==
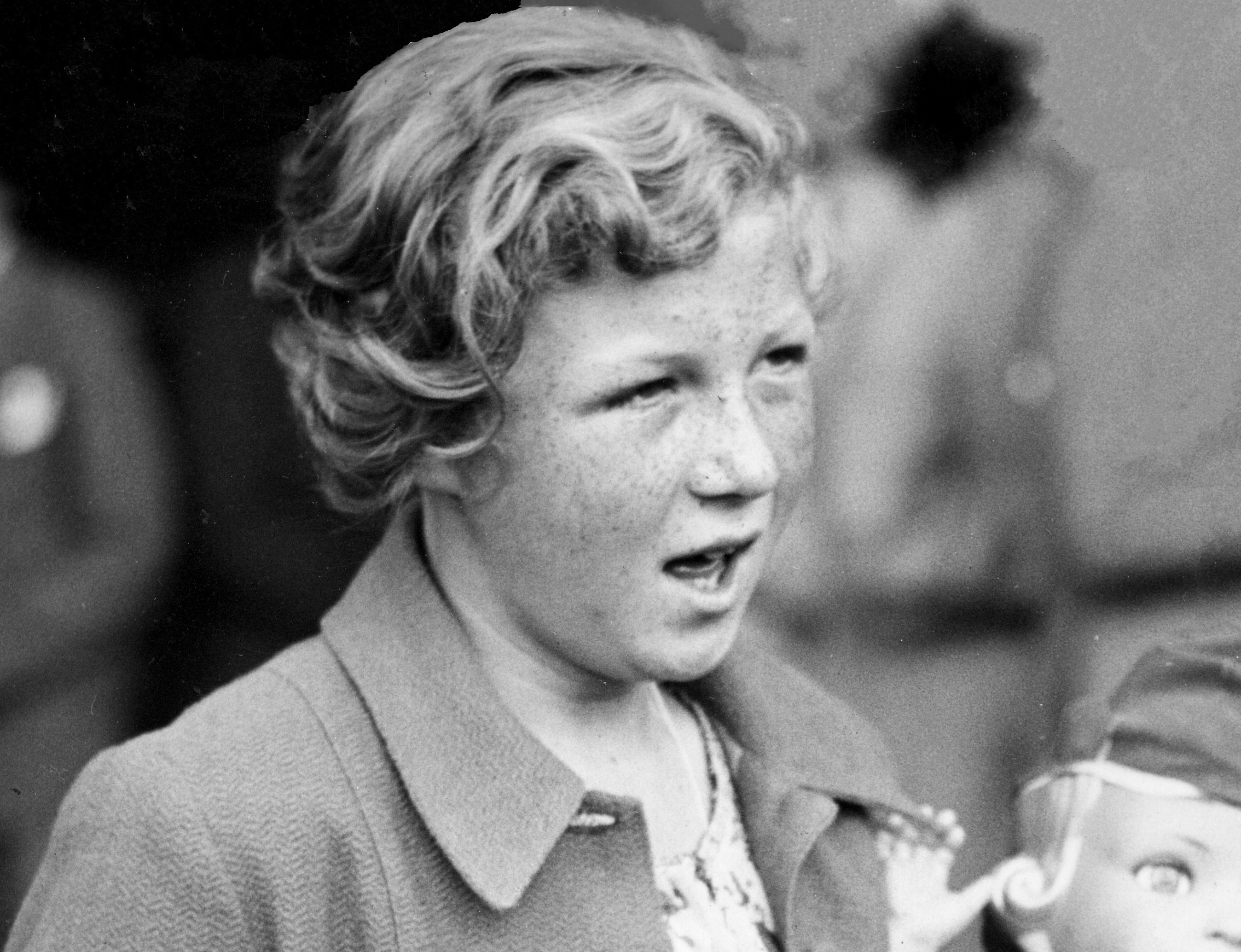
Inge Sørensen.

=== January–March ===
- 7 January – Karen Strand, silversmith (died 2000)

=== April–June ===
- 24 June – John Hansen, football player (died 1990)

=== July–September ===
- 18 July – Inge Sørensen, swimmer (died 2011)
- 14 August – Holger Juul Hansen, actor (died 2013 in Denmark)

=== October–December ===
- 10 November – Klaus Baess, Olympic sailor (died 2018)
- 20 November – Karen Harup, swimmer (died 2009)
- 29 November – Erik Balling, TV and film director (died 2005)
- 2 December – Else Marie Pade, composer (died 2016)
- 7 December – Bent Fabricius-Bjerre (a.k.a. Bent Fabric), composer, pianist (died 2020)
- 29 December – Gurli Vibe Jensen, missionary, priest and writer (died 2016)

== Deaths ==
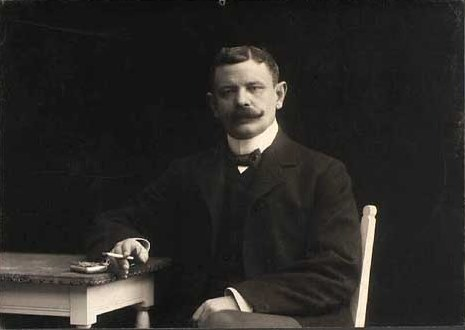
Walter Christmas.

- 18 March – Walter Christmas, author (b. 1861)
- 12 April – Frederik Levy, architect (born 1851 in Germany)
- 17 May – Niels Peter Bornholdt, businessman (born 1842)
- 19 September – Hannibal Sehested, prime minister of Denmark (b. 1842)
- 7 December – Rudolph Sophus Bergh, composer (b. 1859)
