= 1926 in Denmark =

- Decades: 1900s; 1910s; 1920s; 1930s; 1940s
- See also: Other events of 1926; List of years in Denmark

Events from the year 1926 in Denmark.

== Incumbents ==
- Monarch – Christian X
- Prime minister – Thorvald Stauning (until 14 December), Thomas Madsen-Mygdal

== Sports ==
=== Date unknown ===
- B 1903 wins their third Danish football championship by defeating B 1901 4 - 1 in the final of the 1925–26 Landsfodboldturneringen.

== Births ==
=== January to March ===
- 3 February – Verner Panton, architect, furniture designer (died 1998)
- 8 February - Birgitte Reimer, film actress (died 2021 in France)
- 16 February – Arne Vodder, furniture designer (died 2009)

=== April to June ===
- 18 May – Dirch Passer, actor (died 1980)
- 29 April - Jacob Jensen, designer (died 2015)

=== July to September ===
- 7 July – Thorkild Simonsen, politician (died 2022)
- 9 July – Ben Roy Mottelson, American-Danish nuclear physicist (died 2022)
- 23 July - Richard Winther, painter (died 2007)

=== October to December ===
- 15 December – Jørn Larsen, painter and sculptor (died 2004)

== Deaths ==
=== January to March ===
- 12 January – Roger Henrichsen, composer and pianist (born 1876)
- 22 February - Bertha Wegmann, painter (born 1847)
- 7 March – Carl Nicolai Starcke, sociologist, educator, politician and philosopher (born 1858)

=== April to July ===
- 17 June – Viggo Lindstrøm, actor and theatre director (born 1858)
- 24 June – Thomas Vilhelm Garde, naval officer, Greenland explorer (born 1859)
- 29 July - Sophus Falckm businessman (born 1864)

=== August to December ===
- 27 August – Anthonore Christensen, painter (born 1849)
- 14 September – John Louis Emil Dreyer, astronomer (born 1852)
- 22 October – Magda von Dolcke, actress (born 1838)
- 28 December – Elisabeth Wandel, painter (born 1850)
