= 1925 in Denmark =

- Decades: 1900s; 1910s; 1920s; 1930s; 1940s
- See also: Other events of 1925; List of years in Denmark

Events from the year 1925 in Denmark.

== Incumbents ==
- Monarch – Christian X
- Prime minister – Thorvald Stauning

== Sports ==
- 15 October – Hvidovre IF is founded.

=== Date unknown ===
- Kjøbenhavns Boldklub wins their sixth Danish football championship by defeating Aarhus Gymnastikforening 9–2 in the final of the 1924–25 Danish National Football Tournament.

== Births ==
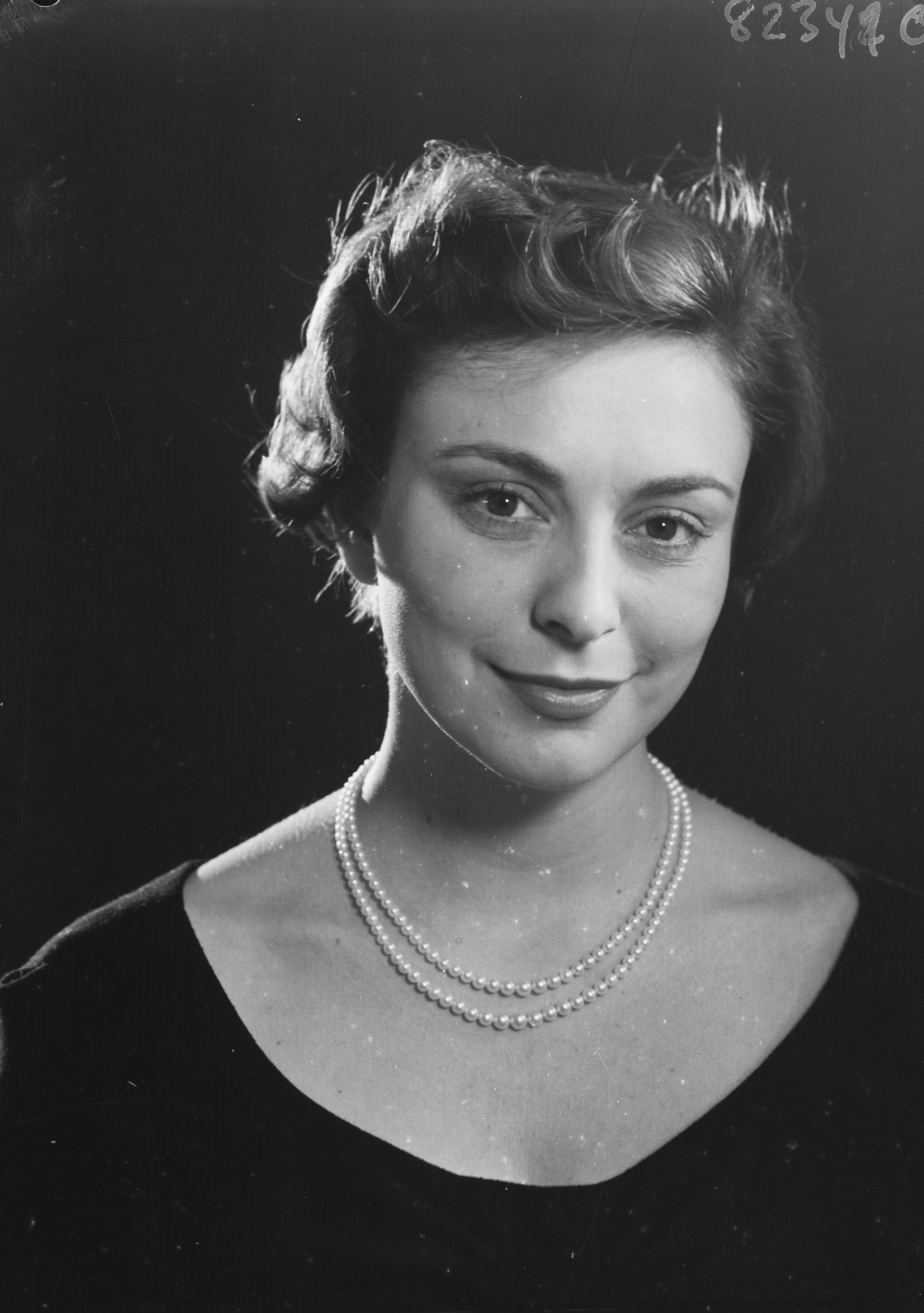
Helle Virkner.

=== April–June ===
- 23 May – Rigmor Mydtskov, photographer (died 2010)
- 22 June – Peter Seeberg, author (died 1999)

=== July–September ===
- 20 August – Henning Larsen, architect (died 2013)
- 15 September – Helle Virkner, actress and Danish First Lady (died 2009)

=== October–December ===
- 15 October – Jørgen Sonne, writer (died 2015)

== Deaths ==
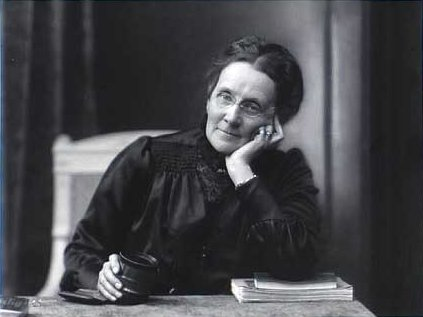
Julie Laurberg.

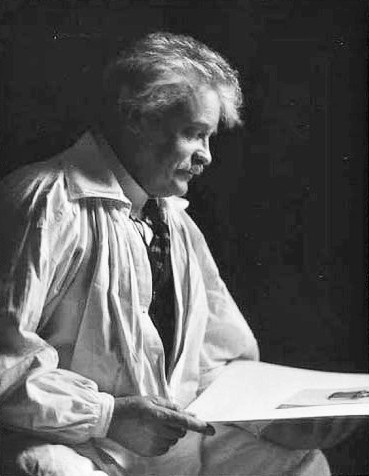
Georg Jensen.

=== January–March ===
- 31 March – Louise Winteler, educator (born 1834)

=== April–June ===
- 1 April – Lars Jørgen Madsen, multiple Olympic medalist in rifle shooting (born 1871)
- 13 April – Frederik Buch, film actor of the silent film era (born 1875)
- 29 June – Julie Laurberg, photographer (born 1856)

=== July–September ===
- 13 July – Kristiane Konstantin-Hansen, weaver, textile artist, retailer and feminist (born 1848)
- 25 September – Ursula Dahlerup, businessman and memorist (born 1840)

=== October–December ===
- 2 October – Georg Jensen, silversmith (born 1866)
- 10 October – Johanne Andersen , women's rights activist (born 1862)
- 25 October – Adolf Heinrich-Hansen, painter (born 1859)
- 24 November – Alexander Foss, businessman (died 1858)
