= 1927 in Denmark =

- Decades: 1900s; 1910s; 1920s; 1930s; 1940s
- See also: Other events of 1927; List of years in Denmark

Events from the year 1927 in Denmark.

== Incumbents ==
- Monarch – Christian X
- Prime minister – Thomas Madsen-Mygdal

== Events ==
- 15 August – Experimenterende Danske Radioamatører is founded.

== Sports ==
- 26 June – B 93 wins their second Danish football championship by defeating Skovshoved IF 5–1 in the final of the 1926–27 Landsfodboldturneringen at Københavns Idrætspark.
- 1 October – Køge Boldklub is founded.

== Births ==
=== January–March ===
- 9 January – Thorkild Hansen, author (died 1989)
- 26 March – Palle Sørensen, convicted murderer (died 2018)

=== April–June ===
- 27 April – Poul Vad, author and art historian (died 2003)
- 1 May – Greta Andersen, swimmer (died 2023)
- 4 June – Henning Carlsen, filmmaker (died 2014)

=== July–September ===
- 5 August – Ib Georg Jensen, ceramist, designer and author (died 2021)
- 19 August – Gert Petersen, journalist and politician (died 2009)
- 24 August – Iørn Piø, archivist (died 1998)

=== October–December ===
- 8 November – Jørgen Reenberg, actor (died 2023)

== Deaths ==
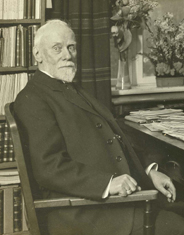
Vilhelm Thomsen.

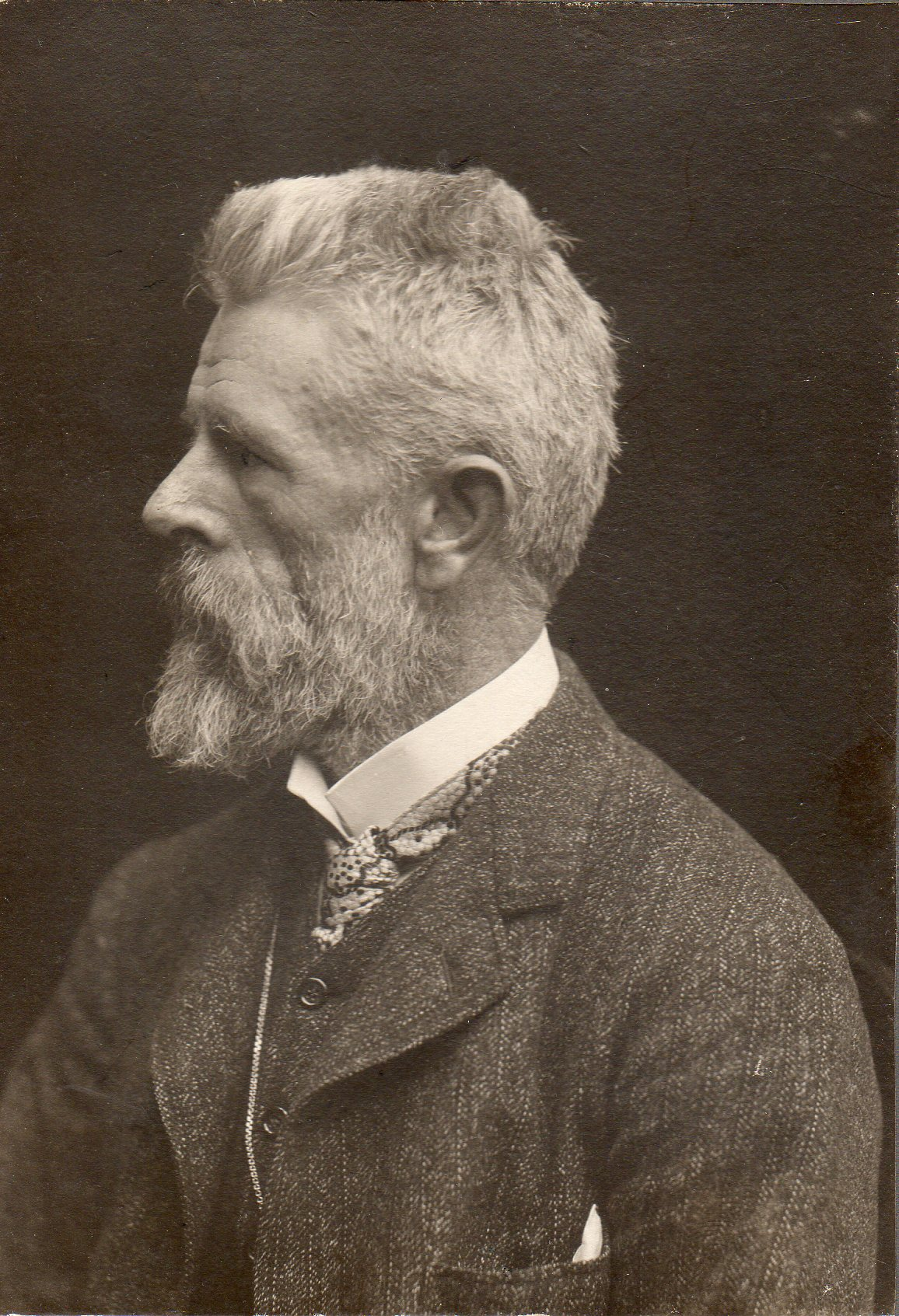
Lauritz Tuxen.

=== January–March ===
- 14 January – Niels Thorkild Rovsingm surgeon (born 1862)
- 15 January – Harald Giersing, painter (born 1851)
- 9 February – ** Peter Mærsk Møller, sea captain (born 1836)
- 19 February – Georg Brandes, critic and scholar (born 1842)
- 23 February – Sveinbjörn Sveinbjörnsson, composer (born 1847 in Iceland)
- 25 March – Johanne Hesbeck, photographer (born 1873)
- 27 March – Klaus Berntsen, politician (born 1844)

=== April–June ===
- 12 May – Vilhelm Thomsen, linguist (born 1842)
- 27 May – Oscar Stribolt, stage and film actor during the silent film era (born 1872)
- 28 June – Otto Bache, painter (born 1839)

=== July–September ===
- 31 August – Alhed Larsen, painter (born 1872)
- 19 September – Michael Ancher, painter (born 1849)

=== October–December ===
- 11 November – Wilhelm Johannsen, pharmacist and botanist (born 1857)
- 21 November – Laurits Tuxen, painter and sculptor (born 1853)
