= 1859 in Denmark =

- Decades: 1830s; 1840s; 1850s; 1860s; 1870s
- See also: Other events of 1859; List of years in Denmark

Events from the year 1859 in Denmark.

== Incumbents ==
- Monarch – Frederick VII
- Prime minister – Carl Christian Hall (until 2 December), Carl Edvard Rotwitt

== Events ==
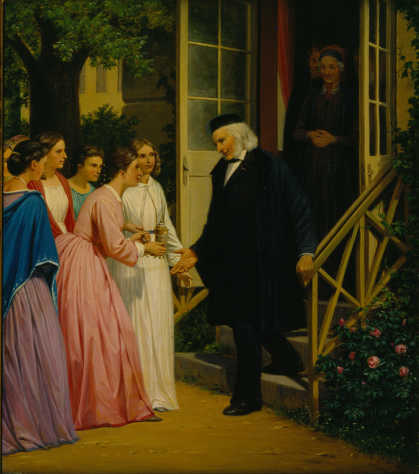
Ingemann receiving his horn on 28 May

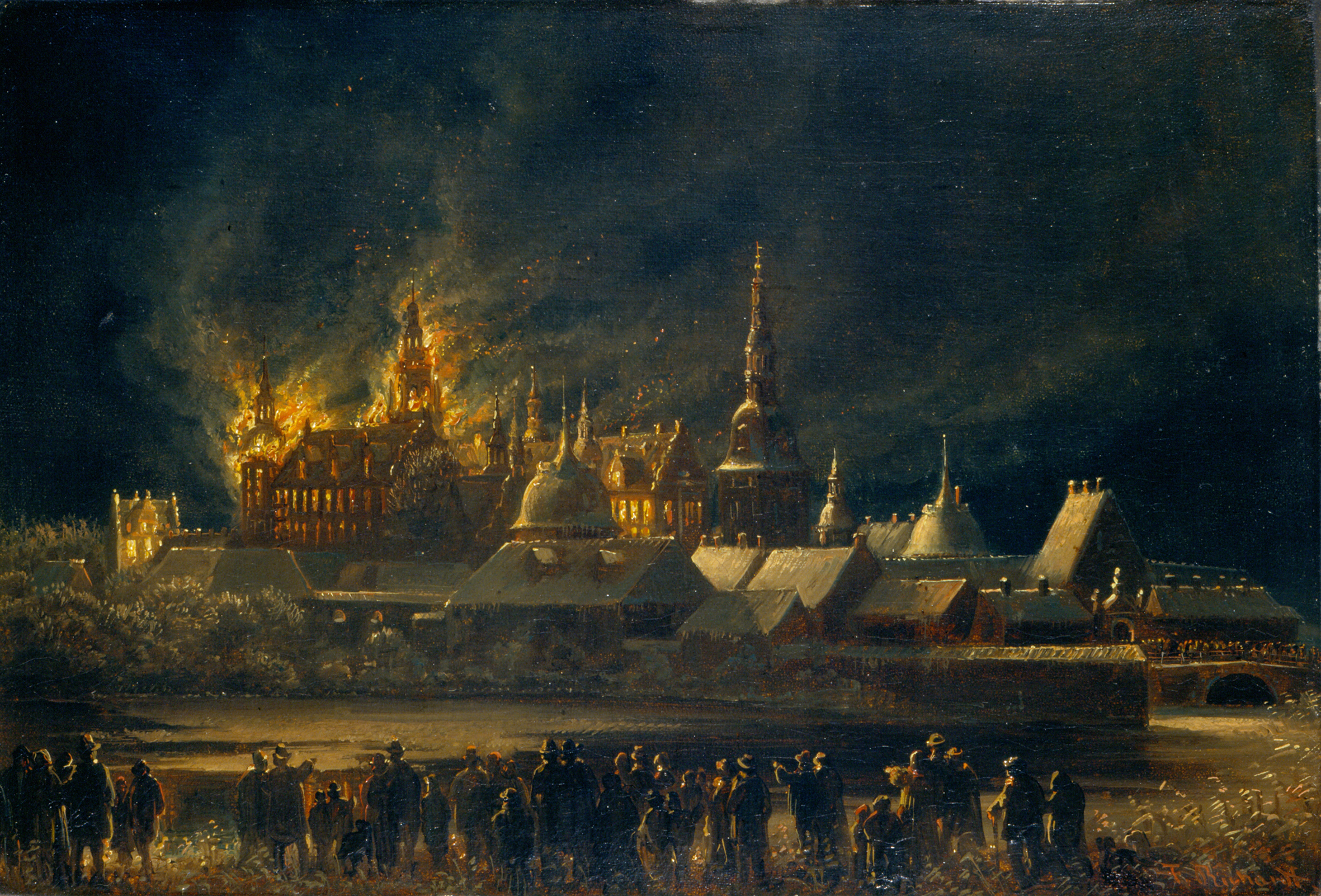
The Fire of Frederiksborg Palace on 17 December

- 6 January – Aarhus Art Museum is founded.
- 2 February – Tøxen's School is inaugurated in Køge.
- 15 April – An act provides for the Royal Danish Navy as well as the Botanical Gardens to leave Gammelholm which is instead to undergo urban redevelopment. The Navy's activities are moved to Nyholm while the Botanical Gardens relocate to their current site.
- 28 May – The poet Bernhard Severin Ingemann, a central figure of the Danish Golden Age, turns 70 and receives a golden horn from the women of Denmark at his home at Sorø Academy.
- 9 August – The new Copenhagen Waterworks are inaugurated.
- 20 September – Copenhagen Zoo is inaugurated.
- 2 October – Illustreret Tidende, Denmark's first illustrated weekly, is published for the first time.
- 17 December – Frederiksborg Castle is devastated by fire but Frederiksborg Chapel is saved.

=== Undated ===
- House numbers are introduced in Copenhagen
- Albani Brewery is founded in Odense.
- Fabrikken Øresund is founded in Copenhagen.
- The second Blaagaard Seminarium is founded.
- Hotel Marienlyst opens in Helsingør.

== Births ==
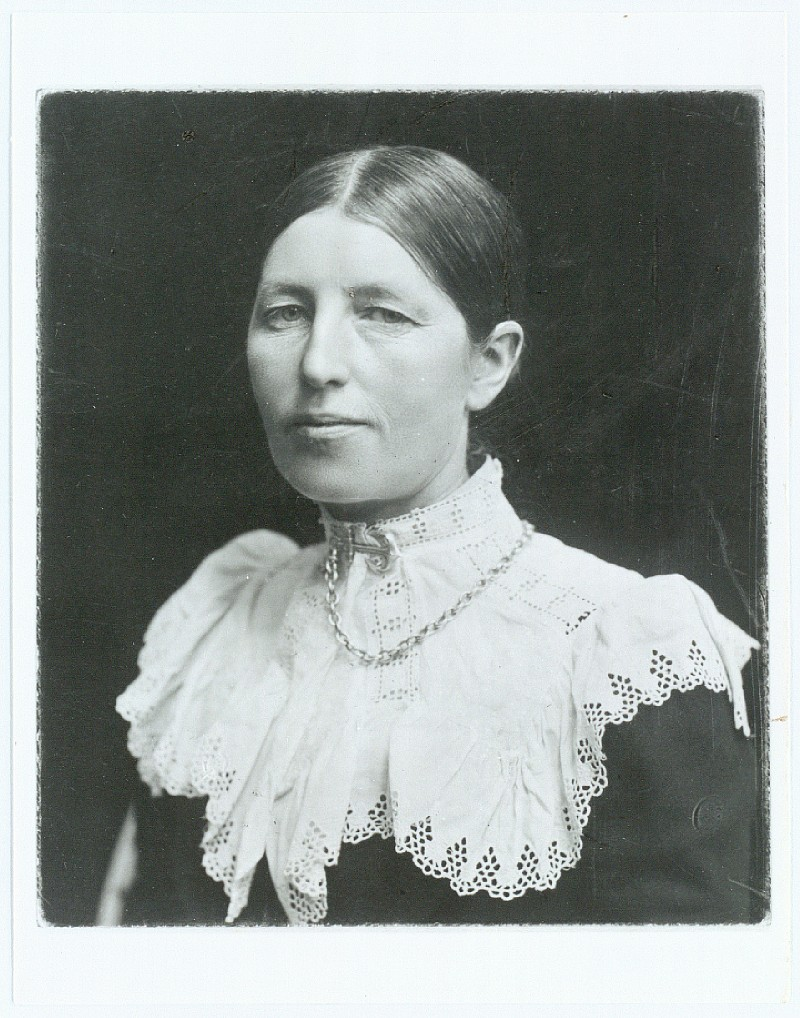
Anna Ancher.

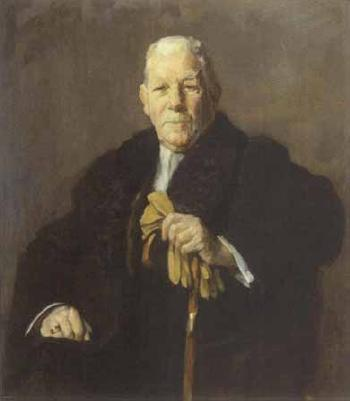
Christian Schmiegelow.

=== January–March ===
- 31 March – Hans Christian Viggo-Hansen, painter, sculptor and artisan metalsmith (died 1930)

=== April–June ===
- 21 April – Christian Sonne, politician (died 1941)
- 13 May – August Enna, composer (died 1939)
- 28 May – Hanna Adler, educator (died 1947)
- 16 June – Max Henius, biochemist, co-founder of the American Academy of Brewing (died 1935)
- 25 June – Gerhard Heilmann, paleontologist, scientific illustrator (died 1946)

=== July–September ===
- 18 August – Anna Ancher, painter (died 1935)
- 20 August – Emma Eleonore Meyer, painter (died 1921)
- 4 September – Christian Schmiegelow, businessman (died 1949)
- 13 September – Anton Rosen, architect (died 1928)
- 22 September – Rudolph Sophus Bergh, composer (died 1924)

=== October–December ===
- 22 October
  - Thomas Vilhelm Garde, naval officer, Greenland explorer (died 1926)
  - Eline Hansen, feminist (died 1919)
- 29 November – Adolf Heinrich-Hansen, painter (died 1925)
- 10 December – Peder Mørk Mønsted, painter (died 1941)

== Deaths ==
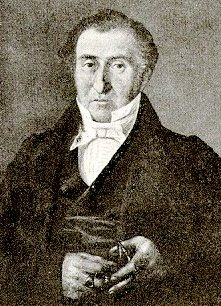
Hartvig Philip Rée.

- 13 March – Vilhelm Pedersen, artist, illustrator (born 1820)
- 22 June – Ulrich Anton Schønheyder, naval officer (born 1775)
- 24 September – Emanuel Larsen, marine painter (born 1823)
- 1 October – Hartvig Philip Rée. businessman (born 1778)
