= 1998 in Denmark =

- Decades: 1970s; 1980s; 1990s; 2000s; 2010s
- See also: Other events of 1998; List of years in Denmark

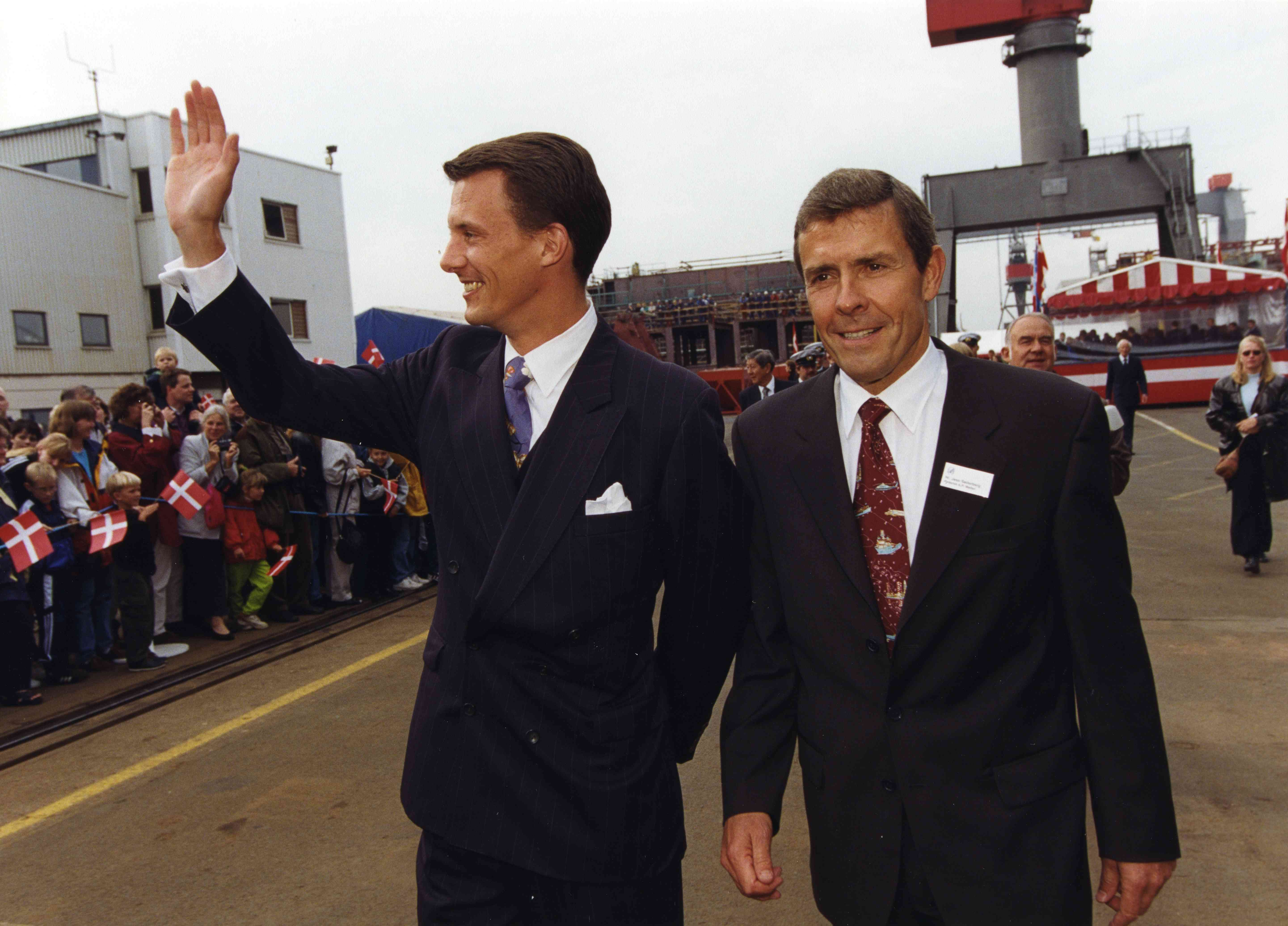
inauguration of Svendborg 1998

Events from the year 1998 in Denmark.

== Incumbents ==
- Monarch - Margrethe II
- Prime minister - Poul Nyrup Rasmussen

== Events ==
- 14 June - The Great Belt Fixed Link opens to traffic, connecting eastern and western Denmark.

== Culture ==
=== Film ===
- 1 May – The first Dogme 95 film, Thomas Vinterberg's The Celebration, is released.
- 20 May – Dogme #2—Lars von Trier's The Idiots—is released.
- May – The Celebration wins the Prix du Jury at the 51st Cannes Film Festival.

== Sports ==
=== Football ===
- 21 May – Brøndby IF wins the 1997–98 Danish Cup by defeating F.C. Copenhagen 4–1 in the final.
- 10 June – 12 July – Denmark participates in the 1998 FIFA World Cup in France.
  - 24 June – Denmark takes the second place in Group C of the initial group stage and is on to the knockout stage.
  - 28 June Denmark defeats Nigeria 4–1 in the Round of 16.
  - 3 July – Denmark is defeated 3–2 by Brazil in the quarterfinal.

=== Badminton ===
- Kastrup Magleby BK wins the Europe Cup.

=== Cycling ===
- 8 April – Lars Michaelsen finishes second in the Gent–Wevelgem road cycling race in Belgium.
- April – Bo Hamburger wins La Flèche Wallonne.
- 29 August – Rolf Sørensen wins the 1998 Ronde van Nederland.
- Silvio Martinello (ITA) and Marco Villa (ITA) win the Six Days of Copenhagen six-day track cycling race.

=== Handball ===
- 20 December – Denmark wins silver at the 1998 European Women's Handball Championship in the Netherlands after being defeated by Norway in the final.

=== Other ===
- 1 February – Thomas Bjørn wins Heineken Classic in Australia on the 1998 European Tour.
- 18–25 April – With five gold medals, two silver medals and six bronze medals, Denmark finishes as the best nation at the 16th European Badminton Championships in Sofia, Bulgaria.
- 3 September – Erik Gundersen wins the 1988 Individual Speedway World Championship.

== Births ==
=== January–March ===
- 23 January – Thomas Meilstrup, singer, actor and son of Gry Meilstrup.
- 24 March – Emma Riis-Kofoed, ballet dancer
- 31 March – Oskar Buur, soccer player

=== April–June ===
- 2 May – Anders Dreyer, footballer

=== July–September ===
- 24 July – Hugo Helmig, musician (died 2022)

=== October–December ===
- 29 October – Prince Constantine Alexios of Greece and Denmark, eldest son and second child of Crown Prince Pavlos and Crown Princess Marie-Chantal of Greece

== Deaths ==
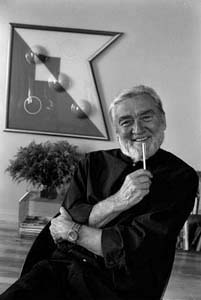
Verner Panton.

- 16 February – Iørn Piø, archivist (born 1927)
- 23 May – Ebbe Rode, actor (died 1910)
- 3 June – Poul Bundgaard, actor and singer (born 1922)
- 17 August – Raquel Rastenni, singer (born 1915)
- 5 September – Verner Panton, designer (born 1926)
