= 2000 in Denmark =

- Decades: 1980s; 1990s; 2000s; 2010s; 2020s
- See also: Other events of 2000; List of years in Denmark

The following lists events that happened during 2000 in Denmark.

== Incumbents ==
- Monarch – Margrethe II
- Prime minister - Poul Nyrup Rasmussen

== Events ==
- 2 July – The Øresund Bridge opens for traffic across the link, connecting Copenhagen and Malmö, Sweden.
- 28 September – Euro referendum takes place on whether Denmark should switch its currency to the Euro. It was rejected with 53% of voters saying no and 47% saying yes.

== Culture ==
=== Art ===
- Floorless art collective is founded.

=== Film ===
- 22 May – Lars von Trier's film Dancer in the Dark wins the Palme d'Or at the 2000 Cannes Film Festival.

=== Media ===
- 12 February – It is announced that Claus Bjørn Larsen wins World Press Photo of the Year for an image of a wounded Kosovar Albanian refugee in the Albanian border town of Kukes in April 1999.

=== Music ===
- 19 February - Dansk Melodi Grand Prix 2000, the Danish selection process to Eurovision was won by Olsen Brothers with the song "Smuk som et stjerneskud". Lyrics were later changed into English (Fly on the Wings of Love)
- 13 May - In Stockholm Olsen Brothers gained a second victory for Denmark with 195 points and beating Russia by 40 points
- Eurodance band Infernal released their second album Waiting for Daylight, which contains songs like "Serengeti", "Sunrise" and "Muzaik"

== Sports ==
- 15 September – 1 October – Denmark at the 2000 Summer Olympics in Sydney: 2 gold medals, 3 silver medals and 1 bronze medal.

=== Badminton ===
- Kastrup Magleby BK wins Europe Cup.
- 25–29 April – With five gold medals, three silver medals and three bronze medals, Denmark finishes as the best nation at the 17th European Badminton Championships in Glasgow, Scotland.

=== Football ===
- 1 June – Viborg FF wins the 1999–2000 Danish Cup by defeating AAB 1–0 in the final.
- 10 June – 2 July – Denmark participates in the UEFA Euro 2000 in Belgium and Netherlands but does not make it beyond the initial group stage after losing its games against France, Czech Republic and Netherlands.

=== Golf ===
- 11 June – Steen Tinning wins The Celtic Manor Resort Wales Open on the 2000 European Tour.
- 23 July – Thomas Bjørn wins the 2000 Open Championship.
- 3 September – Thomas Bjørn wins BMW International Open on the 2000 European Tour.

=== Handball ===
- 1 October – Denmark wins gold in the Women's handball tournament at the 2000 Summer Olympics by defeating Hungary 27–25 in the final.

=== Swimming ===
- 3–9 July – Denmark wins two silver medals and two bronze medals at the 2000 European Aquatics Championships.

=== Other ===
- 18 June – Tom Kristensen wins Le Mans as part of the Audi team.

== Births ==
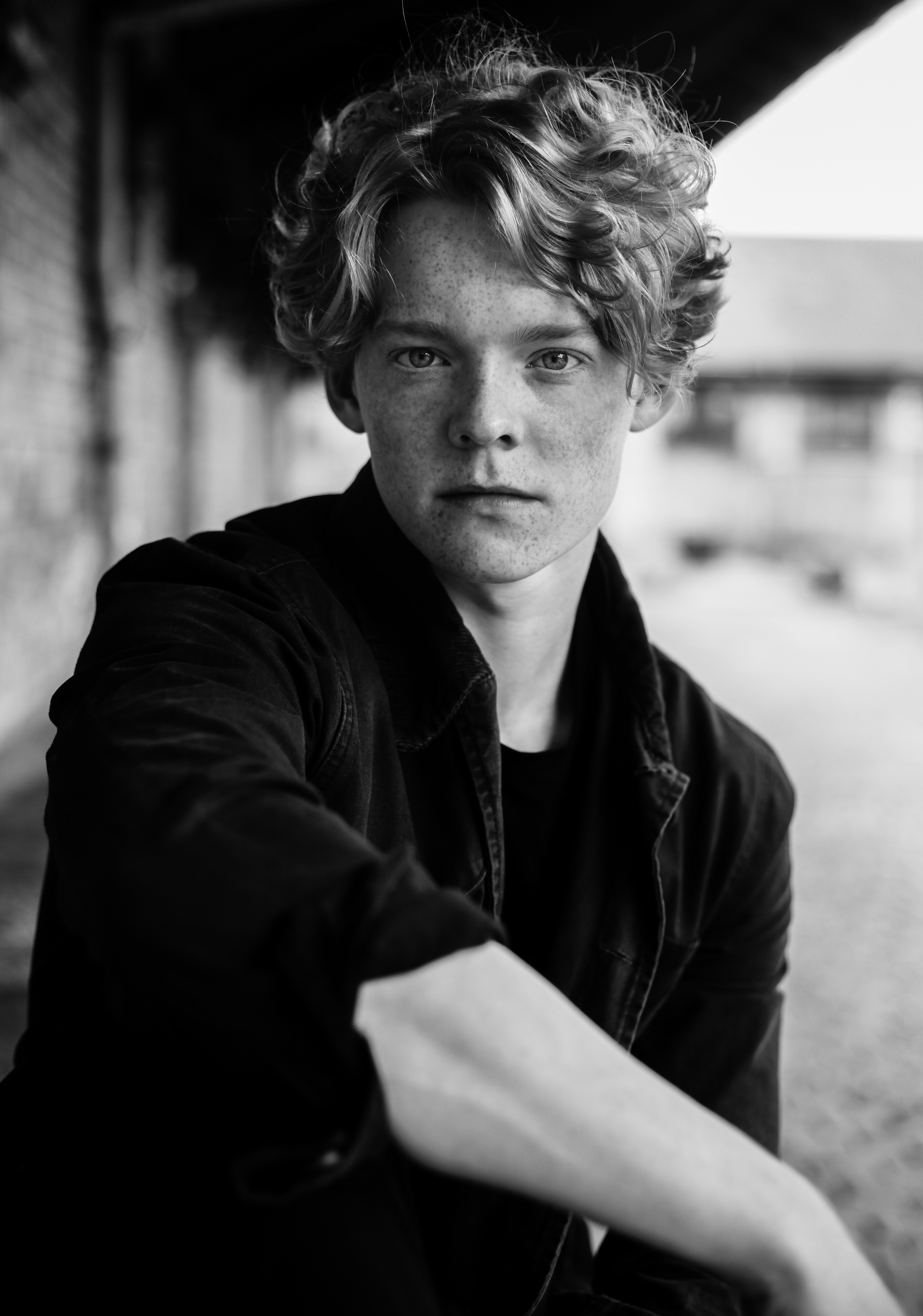
Lucas Lynggaard Tønnesen.

- 12 August – Prince Achileas-Andreas of Greece and Denmark, second son and third child of Crown Prince Pavlos and Crown Princess Marie-Chantal of Greece
- 1 July – Mads Hermansen, footballer
- 3 July – Mikkel Damsgaard, footballer
- 13 July – Lucas Lynggaard Tønnesen, actor
- 26 September – Mattias Skjelmose, racing cyclist
- 11 December – Simon Pytlick, handballer
- 13 December – Mads Søgaard, ice hockey player

== Deaths ==
=== January–March ===
- 10 February – Karen Strand, silversmith (born 1924)
- 29 February – Karen Hoff, canoeist (born 1921)

=== April–June ===
- 25 April – Niels Viggo Bentzon, composer (born 1919)
- 23 May– Poul Hartling, politician, former prime minister of Denmark (born 1914)
- 18 August – Aksel Bender Madsen, furniture designer (born 1916)

=== July–September ===
- 15 August – Ulla Barding-Poulsen, Olympic fencer (born 1912)

=== October–December ===
- 7 November - Queen Ingrid (born in 1910)
- 22 December – Hans Ussing, zoologist (born 1911)
