= 1922 in Denmark =

- Decades: 1900s; 1910s; 1920s; 1930s; 1940s
- See also: Other events of 1922; List of years in Denmark

Events from the year 1922 in Denmark.

== Incumbents ==
- Monarch – Christian X
- Prime minister – Niels Neergaard

== Events ==
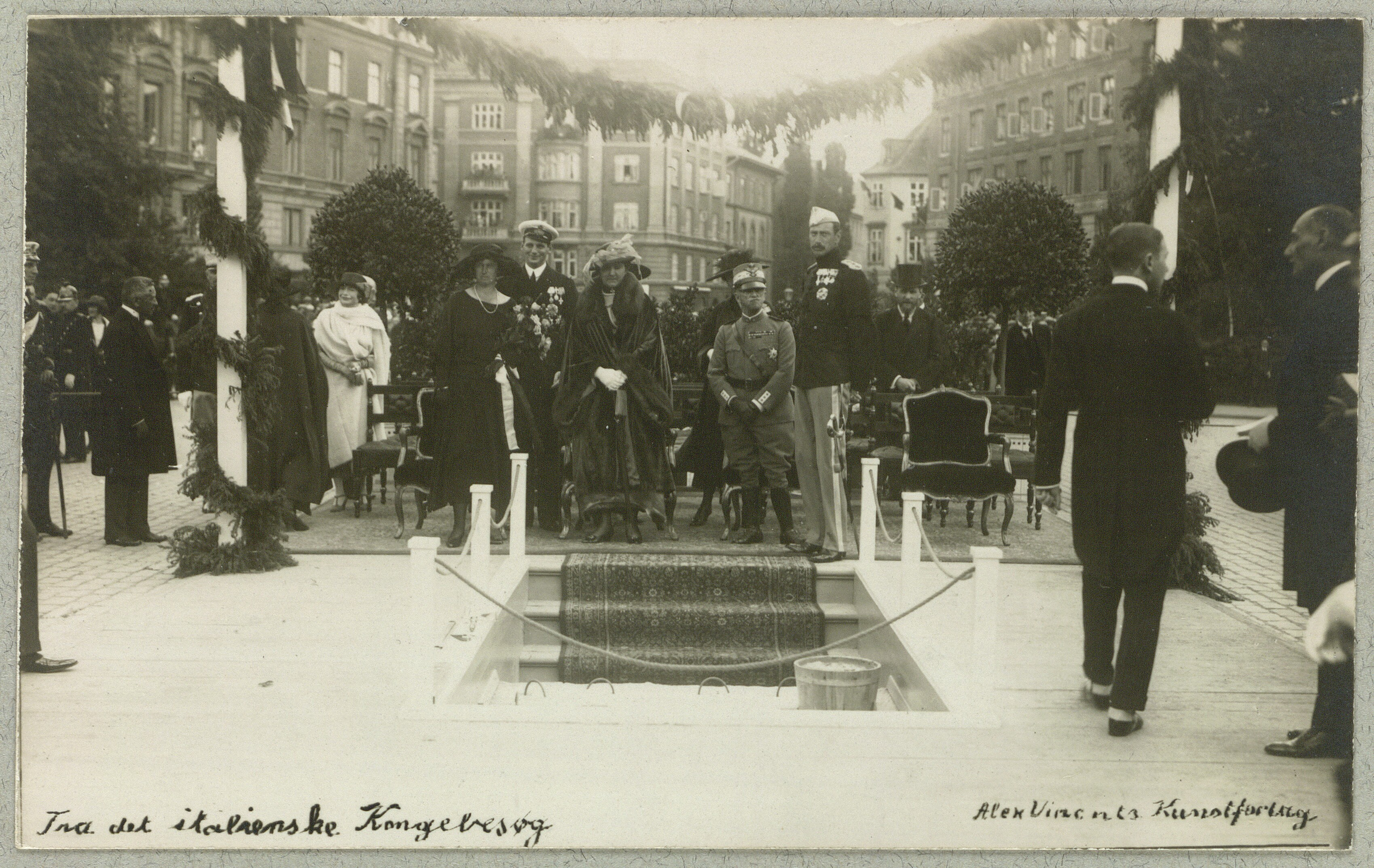
The foundation stone for the Dante Column is set in Copenhagen.

- 21–23 June – The foundation stone for the Dante Column on Danttes Plads in Copenhagen is set.

== Sports ==
=== Undated ===
- KB wins their fifth Danish football championship by defeating B 1901 4–2 in the final of the 1921–22 Danish National Football Tournament.

== Births ==
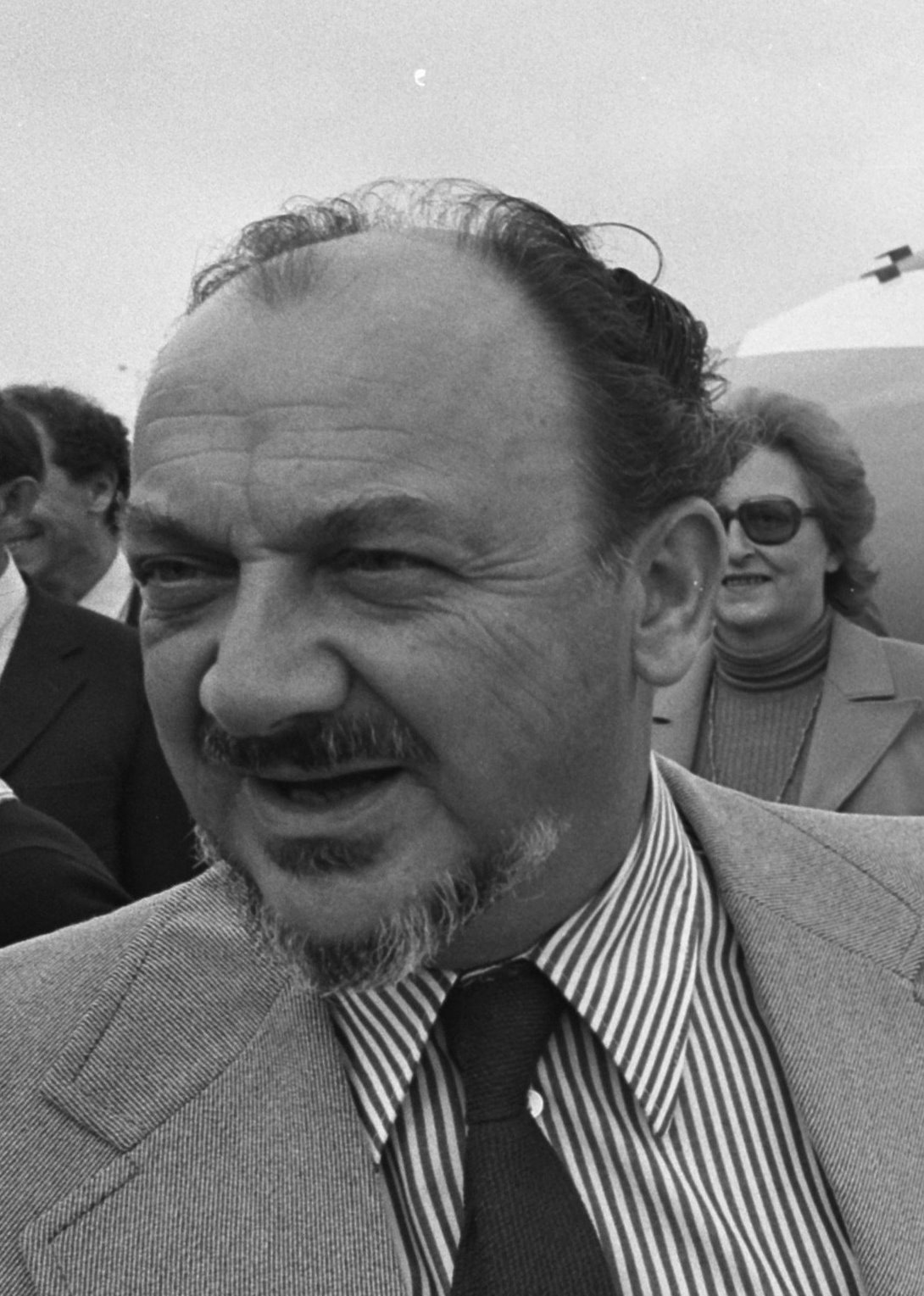
Anker Jørgensen.

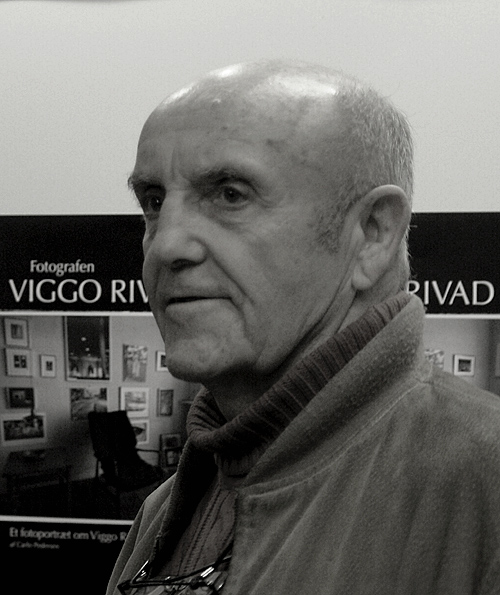
Viggo-Rivad.

=== January–March ===
- 9 March – Count Flemming of Rosenborg (died 2002 in France)

=== April–June ===
- 12 April – Erik Ninn-Hansen, politician (died 2014)
- 19 April – Poul Andersen, resistance member (died 2006)
- 25 April – Hans Tabor, diplomat (died 2003)
- 12 June – Leif Thybo, composer (died 2001)
- 17 June – Lisbet Dæhlin, ceramist (died 2012)
- 19 June – Aage Bohr, nuclear physicist and Nobel Prize laureate (died 2009)

=== July–September ===
- 3 July – Viggo Rivad, photographer (died 2016)
- 13 July – Anker Jørgensen, politician, prime minister of Denmark (died 2016)
- 28 September – Birgit Fogh-Andersen, politician (died 2012)

=== October–December ===
- 19 December – Niels Holst-Sørensen, athlete and airforce officer (died 2023)
- 20 December – Svend Wiig Hansen, sculptor and painter (died 1997)

== Deaths ==
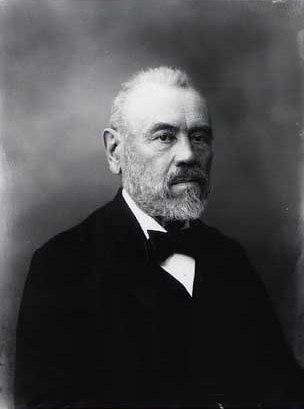
Johannes Emil Gnudtzmann.

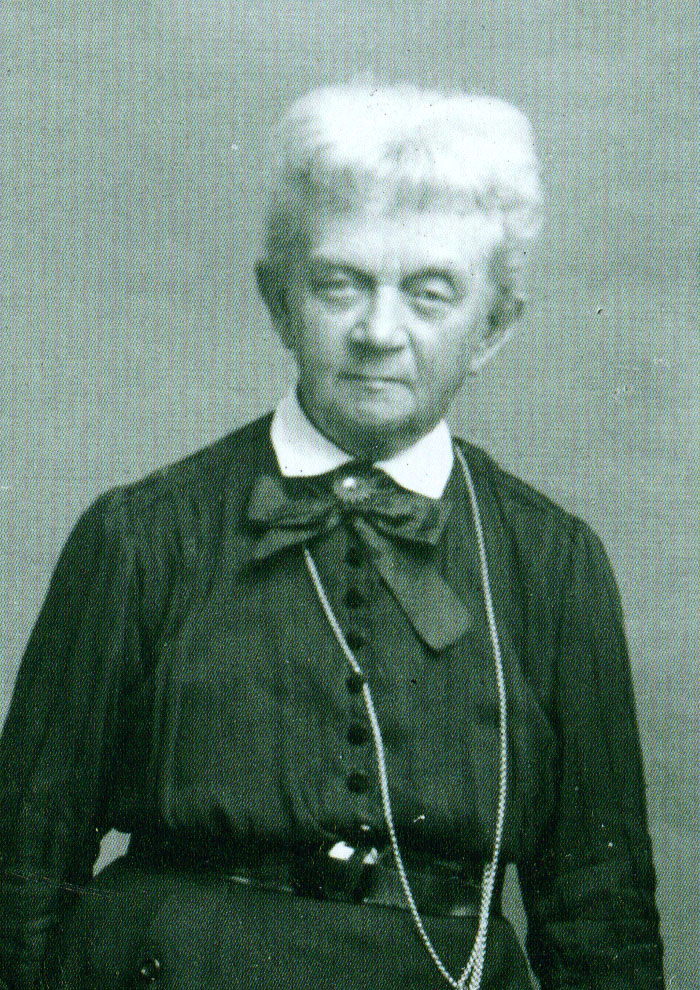
Emilie Mundt.

=== January–March ===
- 22 January – Fredrik Bajer, writer (born 1837)
- 9 February – Harald Krenchel, fencer (born 1884)
- 24 March – Johanne Christine Petersen, school principal (born 1847)

=== April–June ===
- 14 April – Johannes Emil Gnudtzmann, architect (born 1837)
- 9 May – Charlotte Eilersgaard, author and editor (born 1858)
- 21 May – Alfred Benzon, pharmacist and industrialist (born 1855)
- 4 June – Dick Nelson, boxer (born 1880)

=== July–September ===
- 17 July – Bernhard Olsen, museum director (born 1836)
- 4 September – Frederik Jacobsen, actor (born 1876)
- 19 September – Philip Schou, businessman (born 1838)
- 22 September – Ida Falbe-Hansen, educator and women's activist (born 1849)

=== October–December ===
- 25 October
  - Emilie Mundt, painter (born 1842)
  - Niels Christian Hansen, painter (born 1834)
- 4 December – Hermann Baagøe Storck, architect (born 1839)
