= 1999 in Denmark =

- Decades: 1970s; 1980s; 1990s; 2000s; 2010s
- See also: Other events of 1999; List of years in Denmark

Events from the year 1999 in Denmark.

== Incumbents ==
- Monarch – Margrethe II
- Prime minister – Poul Nyrup Rasmussen

== The arts ==
=== Film ===
- 10 January – Thomas Vinterberg's The Celebration wins the award for Best Foreign Language Film at the 64th New York Film Critics Circle Awards.
- 24 January – The Celebration is nominated for a Golden Globe for Best Foreign Language Film at the 56th Golden Globe Awards but the award goes to the Brazilian Central Station.
- 21 February – Søren Kragh-Jacobsen's Mifune's Last Song wins the Jury Grand Prix at the 49th Berlin International Film Festival.
- 21 March – Anders Thomas Jensen's short comedy film Election Night wins an Oscar for Best Short Subject at the 71st Academy Awards.

=== Music ===
- 6 November – Lys på din vej by Frederik Magle is premiered at the christening of prince Nikolai of Denmark in Fredensborg Palace.

== Sports ==
=== Badminton ===
- 9–14 March – Peter Gade wins gold in men's singles at the 1999 All England Open Badminton Championships.
- 10–23 May – Denmark wins a gold medal and four bronze medals at the 1999 IBF World Championships.

=== Cycling ===
- May – Michael Sandstød wins Four Days of Dunkirk.
- Tayeb Braikia (DEN) and Jimmi Madsen (DEN) win the Six Days of Copenhagen six-day track cycling race.

=== Football ===
- 13 May – Ab wins the 1998–99 Danish Cup by defeating AAB 2–1 in the final.
- 8 September – Denmark qualifies for UEFA Euro 2000 by defeating Italy 3–3 in their last match in Group 1 of the UEFA Euro 2000 qualifying.

=== Other ===
- 6 March – Wilson Kipketer wins silver in Men's 800 metres at the 1999 IAAF World Indoor Championships in Maebashi, Japan.
- 2–6 June – Denmark wins two silver medals at the 1999 World Taekwondo Championships.
- 26 July – 1 August – Mette Jacobsen wins a gold medal in the Women's 200 metre butterfly at the 1999 European Aquatics Championships
- 29 August – Wilson Kipketer wins gold in Men's 800 metres at the 1999 World Championships in Athletics in Seville, Spain.
- 2 September – Hans Nielsen wins the 1989 Individual Speedway World Championship in Munich, Germany.
- 24 October – Thomas Bjørn wins Sarazen World Open on the 1999 European Tour.

== Births ==
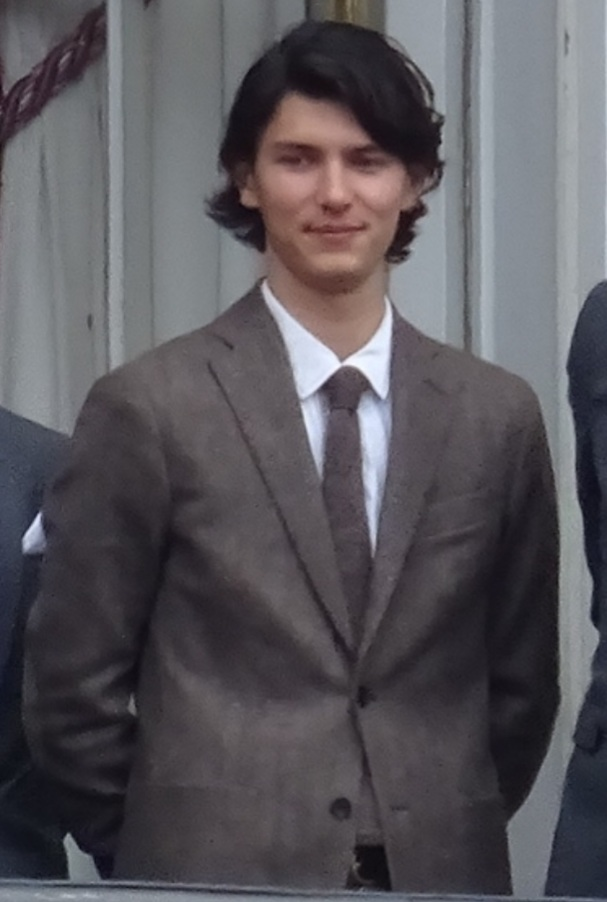
Count Nikolai of Denmark.

=== January–March ===
- 22 March – Oliver Christensen, football player
- 31 March
  - Jens Odgaard, football player
  - Jonas Røndbjerg, ice hockey player

=== April–June ===
- 25 June – Morten Hjulmand, football player

=== July–September ===
- 30 July – Victor Torp, footballer
- 22 July – Alma Agger, singer
- 28 August – Count Nikolai of Denmark, royal
- 14 September – Count Richard von Pfeil und Klein-Ellguth, royal

=== October–December ===
- 7 November – Mads Strange, politician
- 29 December – Andreas Skov Olsen, football player

== Deaths ==
- 8 January – Peter Seeberg, author (born 1925)
- 14 February – Sven Havsteen-Mikkelsen, painter and illustrator (born 1912)
- 14 March – Abraham Kurland, olympic wrestler (born 1912)
- 9 May – Ole Søltoft, actor (born 1941)

== See also ==
- 1999 in Danish television
