= 2007 in Denmark =

- Decades: 1980s; 1990s; 2000s; 2010s; 2020s
- See also: Other events of 2007; List of years in Denmark

Events from the year 2007 in Denmark.

== Incumbents ==
- Monarch – Margrethe II
- Prime minister – Anders Fogh Rasmussen

== Events ==
=== February ===
- 21 February – Denmark will withdraw its 460 troops from the Iraq War by August.

=== March ===
- 3 March – The eviction of Ungdomshuset by Danish police results in more rioting in Nørrebro, Copenhagen, leading to about 100 arrests during a second night of protests.
- 5 March – Ungdomshuset in Copenhagen, is demolished to prevent it from being re-occupied.

=== April ===
- 11 April – The United States Secretary of Defense Robert M. Gates meets with the Defense Ministers of the United Kingdom, Australia, Canada, the Netherlands and Denmark as well as officials from Estonia and Romania to discuss progress in Afghanistan in expectation of a Taliban offensive.

=== May ===
- 15 May – Danish protesters clash with police in Copenhagen with the Little Mermaid being doused with red paint. The clashes followed the demolition of a building in the Freetown Christiania district.
- 25 May – Bjarne Riis admits that he won the Tour de France using banned substances.

=== August ===
- 12 August – Denmark sends a scientific team to the Arctic to try to establish that the Lomonosov Ridge is an extension of Greenland so it can claim sovereignty over oil reserves.

=== September ===
- 4 September – Denmark's intelligence service arrests several people on suspicion of plotting a bomb attack.
- 28 September – The third phase of the Copenhagen Metro opens, connection it to Copenhagen Airport Travelling time between the airport and downtown Copenhagen at Kongens Nytorv is now 14 min.

=== October ===
- 3 October – The Danish Royal Court announces that Prince Joachim has become engaged to Marie Cavallier.

=== November ===
- 15 November – The Spinderiet shopping centre is inaugurated in Valby, Copenhagen

== The arts ==
=== Architecture ===
- 27 June – Lundgaard & Tranberg's Tietgenkollegiet in Copenhagen and 3XN's Alsion in Sønderborg each win a 2007 RIBA European Award at the Royal Institute of British Architects' annual awards ceremony in London.

=== Film ===
- 25 February – At the 79th Academy Awards, Susanne Bier's After the Wedding is among the five films nominated for an Oscar for Best Foreign Language Film but the Oscar goes to the German The Lives Of Others.
- 10 October – It is announced that the Danish film The Art of Crying is the winner of the 2007 Nordic Council Film Prize.

== Sports ==
=== Badminton ===
- 21 January – Peter Gade wins gold in men's single at Malaysia Open.

=== Cycling ===
- 6 February – Franco Marvulli (SUI) and Bruno Risi (SUI) win the Six Days of Copenhagen six-day track cycling race.
- 18 March – Mie Lacota wins Omloop Het Volk.
- 7–29 July – 2007 Tour de France
  - 15 July – Michael Rasmussen wins the 8th stage.
  - 25 July – Michael Rasmussen wins the 16th stage.

=== Football ===
- 15 March – Brøndby IF wins 2006–07 Royal League by defeating FC Copenhagen 1–0 in the final.
- 17 May – Odense Boldklub wins the 2006–07 Danish Cup by defeating FC Copenhagen 2–1 in the final.

=== Golf ===
- 16 September – Søren Hansen wins the Mercedes-Benz Championship (European Tour) on the 2007 European Tour.
- 14 October – Mads Vibe-Hastrup wins Madrid Open on the 2007 European Tour.

=== Handball ===
- 4 February – Denmark wins bronze at the 2007 World Men's Handball Championship in Germany by defeating France 34–27.

=== Motorsports ===
- 27 May – Anders Hansen wins the BMW PGA Championship on the 2007 European Tour.
- 13 October – Nicki Pedersen becomes Speedway World Championship by winning the 2007 Speedway Grand Prix series.

=== Other ===
- 18 September – Mark Madsen wins a silver medal in Men's Greco-Roman 74 kg at the 2007 World Wrestling Championships.

== Births ==
- 21 April – Princess Isabella of Denmark
- 29 November – Chido Obi, footballer

== Deaths ==
=== January–March ===
- 26 January – Hans J. Wegner, furniture designer (born 1914)
- 13 February – Holger Vistisen, actor (born 1932)
- 20 February – Carl-Henning Pedersen, painter (born 1913)
- 25 February – Jytte Borberg, author (born 1917)
- 1 March – Otto Brandenburg, actor and singer (born 1934)

=== April–June ===
- 13 June – Jørgen Kastholm, designer (born 1931)
- 24 June – Natasja Saad, rapper and reggae singer (born 1974)

=== July–September ===
- 1 July – Jørgen Rømer, painter (born 1923)
- 7 July – Gertrud Vasegaard, ceramist (died 1913)
- 3 August – Peter Thorup, musician (born 1948)
- 30 August – Richard Winther, painter (died 1926)
- 7 August – Ulla Strand, badminton player (born 1943)
- 12 September – Isi Foighel, politician (born 1927)
- 12 July – Jane Muus, painter and illustrator (born 1919)

=== October–December ===
- 23 November – Per Wiking, television presenter (born 1931)
- 20 December – Peer Hultberg, author (born 1935)

== See also ==
- 2007 in Danish television
