= The Laundromat Cafe =

Danish café chain

The Laundromat Cafe is the name borne by a chain of four cafés in Copenhagen, Denmark and Reykjavík, Iceland. The first one opened in Elmegade 15, Nørrebro Copenhagen in 2004 and the second one in Århusgade 38, Østerbro Copenhagen two years later. In 2010 two more cafés were opened, at Austurstræti 9 in Reykjavík, Iceland, and at Gammel Kongevej 96 Frederiksberg, Denmark. As the name suggests, laundromats are co-located in the cafés.

The Laundromat Cafe was founded by four Icelandic friends in Copenhagen in 2004, though today only Fridrik Weisshappel remains.
