= Ingeborg Maria Sick =

Danish writer and philanthropist (1858–1951)

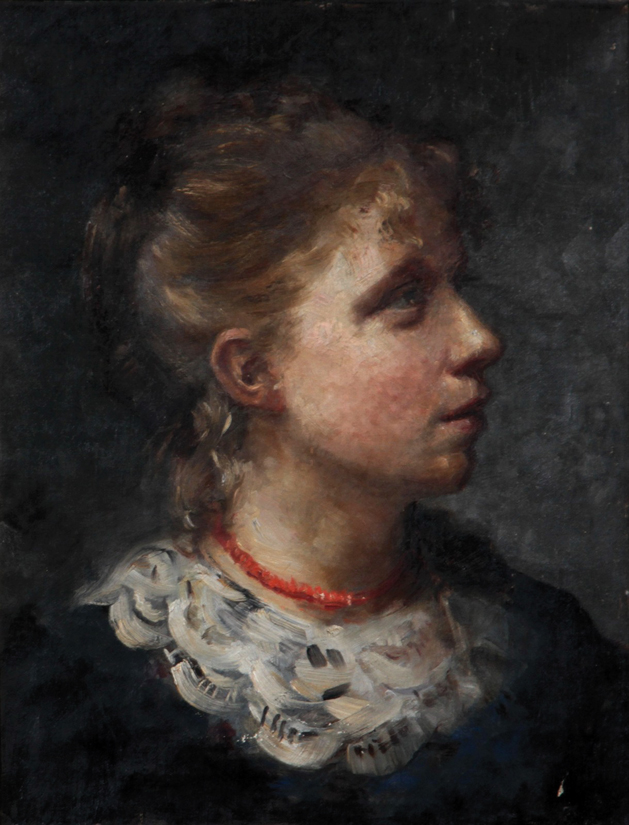
Ingeborg Maria Sick

Ingeborg Maria Sick (1858–1951) was a Danish writer and philanthropist. After devoting many years to supporting philanthropic initiatives for the poor and needy, from her forties she concentrated on writing, publishing some 30 novels as well as poetry and biographies. Fangernes Ven (Friend of the Prisones, 1921), a biography of the Swedish-Finnish philanthropist Mathilda Wrede, is among her most important works. Published in translation throughout Scandinavia and Germany, her novels were widely read. Helligt Ægterskab (Holy Matrimony, 1903) appeared in no less than six editions in a single year.

== Early life ==
Born in Copenhagen on 17 September 1858, Ingeborg Maria Sick was the daughter of the Danish diplomat Carl Emil Sick (1825–64) and his wife Conradine Franciska née Marcher (1827–87). She spent her early years in Paris where her father was stationed until his early death when she returned to Denmark. As a result, she continued to feel half French and visited France frequently.

== Career ==
Financially independent and deeply religious, she spent her early years nursing the needy in the poorer quarters of Copenhagen. She extended her knowledge of private philanthropic enterprise during visits to London and Paris. Thereafter she was employed for a number of years by the welfare services in Copenhagen.

It was not until she was over 40 that Sick turned seriously to writing. In 1900, she published a collection of short stories titled Udi løndom. Billeder og skizzer (In Secret. Pictures and Sketches). Her first popular success came two years later with the romantic novel Højfjælds-Præst (Highland Priest) in which a young upper-class Copenhagen girl falls in love with a Norwegian priest. Helligt Ægteskab (1903) presents the romances of two sisters, a priest's wife who has a happy marriage and a baroness who falls in love with an artist before returning to her husband. Other popular novels included Jomfru Else (Else the Virgin, 1905), Af Jord (Of Earth, 1907), Farmor Ursulas Have (Grandmother Ursula's Garden, 1909) and Ina (1911). While her novels were widely read in translation throughout Scandinavia and in Germany, some were also published in Dutch, English, French and Russian. Given her deep religious convictions, Sick's novels all show that faith in God triumphs over earthly pleasures. Their popularity resulted from well developed female characters and their erotically coloured conflicts.

While her novels remained popular until after the Second World War, today she is remembered above all for two biographies. Fangernes Ven (Friend of the Prisones, 1921) was inspired by Evy Fogelberg's biographies of the Swedish-Finnish philanthropist Mathilda Wrede while Pigen fra Danmark (The Girl from Denmark), which appeared in four parts until 1945, covers the life of the Danish missionary Karen Jeppe, especially her times in Armenia.

Ingeborg Maria Sick died in Hørsholm on 14 November 1951 and was buried in Asminderød Cemetery.
