= Floorless =

floorless is a Danish art collective based in Copenhagen and London, who united in the year 2000 and are working in the boundaries between literature, art, architecture and design. Besides exhibiting and curating they have self-published different magazines, most notably T6 and In The Red #1 & #2 which have contributions from a host of other artists, writers and musicians as well as floorless. They have exhibited in Copenhagen, Aarhus, Odense, Lemvig, London and Barcelona since 2003, but are currently on some sort of hiatus. Most of the artwork produced by floorless has been interventionist or radical in a non-dogmatic leftist political sense and has had connections to youth subculture as well as the avant-garde art-scene. In graphic design, writings, installation and curatorial initiatives their artistic expression shows a DIY ethic closer to contemporary street art than to more conventional gallery art.

In The Red #3 is expected any time between now and the future.
