= Haldur Grüner =

Haldur Ragnvald Grüner (born 17 October 1818 in Kristiansand, Norway, died 8 December 1858) was the founder of Grüners Handelsakademi, a business school in Copenhagen.

His father was a Norwegian lieutenant colonel, but the family moved to Copenhagen when Haldur was young. Here he founded Grüners Handelsakademi in 1843, and remained its leader until his death. He was then succeeded by Albert Kaarup. Grüner published numerous practical manuals, tables, and similar works for merchants. His greatest work was the 8-volume business encyclopedia, Encyklopædi for Handlende, completed by others after his death.

In 1845 he married Jacobine Alette Steen Hoffmann Dewold from Trondheim.

== Bibliography ==
- Lommebog for Handlende, indeholdende en fuldstændig Oversigt over alle fremmede Staters Mynt, Maal og Vægt, beregnet med særdeles Hensyn til Danmark og Norge (1841)
- Brevbog for Handlende indeholdende en sammenhængende Række af Handelsbreve, som Copi af et Handels-Contoirs indgaaende og udgaaende Correspondance (1843)
- Efterretninger om det praktiske Handels-Academi i Kjøbenhavn, Udgivne den 1ste November 1844
- Comptoirtabel som udviser Forholdet mellem fremmed og dansk Mynt, Maal og Vægt (1844)
- Mercantilsk Almanak for Aaret 1846
- Almindelig Brev- Comptoir- og Formularbog (1846), together with Chr. Bartholin, C. V. Rimestad, J. Hellmann, and Carl Schack
- Vexel-Læren, En Haandbog, nærmest bestemt for Handlende (1847)
- Nordisk Handels- og Skibsfarts-Tidende (1848–1851)
- Haandbog for Handlende og Søfarende i Danmark, Norge og Sverrig (1850)
- Myntbog, Afbildning og Beskrivelse af de courserende Guld- og Sølvmynter (1851)
- Mercantil Calender (1851–1859)
- Mercantilt Ugeskrift (January–June 1852)
- Brev-, Comptoir- og Formularbog (1852), together with F. C. Haxthausen, H. P. Holst, Viggo Rothe and C. Schack
- Det enkelte og dobbelte Bogholderi (1854, 2:a upplagan 1867, 3:e upplagan 1879), continued by P.R. Wirén
- Et populairt Foredrag over Bogføring, holdt i Industriforeningen, died 25 January 1856
- Encyclopædi for Handlende, Søfarende, Fabrikanter og andre Forretningsmænd
  - 1. Vexlen efter de danske og vigtigste fremmede Lovgivninger (1854, 2nd ed. 1858)
  - 2. Statspapirer og Actier. En Fremstilling af de europæiske Landes Finantser, Statslaan og Actieselskaber (1854)
  - 3:1. Sø-Assurance. En Vejledning for Handlende, Skibsredre og Søfarende (1859), by W. Benecke
  - 3:2. Haveri og Bodmeri. En Veiledning for Handlende, Skibsredere og Søfarende, by W. Benecke
  - 4. Ledetraad i Varekundskab for Handlende og Mæglere, by O. Chr. Green
  - 5. Dansk Handelsbrevbog ... og en Samling af de i Kjøbmandssproget hyppigst forekommende Ord og techniske Udtryk (1859)
  - 6. Bankvæsenet (1861), by Wm. Rasmussen
  - 7. Bogholderi for Kjøbmænd (1862), by Albert Kaarup
  - 8. Engelsk, tydsk og fransk Handelsbrevbog (1866), by Albert Kaarup
