= Danish Centre for Design Research =

The Danish Centre for Design Research was an organization under the Danish Ministry of Higher Education and Science that was established in 2004 with the purpose of promoting design research and design research environments at the schools of design and architecture in Denmark. The centre was active from 2004 through 2012 as an umbrella organization for design research activities at the Aarhus School of Architecture, the Kolding School of Design and The Royal Danish Academy of Fine Arts, Schools of Architecture, Design and Conservation.

== The Centre’s activities ==
The Danish Centre for Design Research promoted Danish design research by distributing funds from a government budget allocation for research, organizing research seminars and conferences, and offering PhD courses. The Centre published the research journal Artifact and the webzine Mind Design, which presented research findings and articles on developments in the field of design. The Danish Centre for Design Research also developed Webmuseum.dk, which documents and conveys web design history.

In 2005, the Danish Centre for Design Research launched a master's program in design in cooperation with The Royal Danish Academy of Fine Arts, School of Architecture.

== Evaluation and closure ==
The Danish Centre for Design Research and the design research at the design schools were evaluated by an international panel in 2010. After the evaluation, the centre continued its activities for another two years.

The centre was closed by the end of 2012 with reference to the positive design research evaluation in 2010, which documented that the centre had achieved its purpose. The centre's tasks were reassigned to the schools of architecture and design.
