= Gurli Vibe Jensen =

Danish missionary, priest and writer (1924–2016)

- Born: 29 December 1924; Copenhagen, Denmark
- Died: 8 July 2016 (aged 91); Jyderup, West Zealand County, Denmark
- Education: University of Edinburgh; Selly Oak Colleges
- Occupations: Missionary; Priest; Writer
- Years active: 1950–1989

Gurli Vibe Jensen (29 December 1924 – 8 July 2016) was a Danish missionary, priest and writer. She was a teacher in Copenhagen before joining the Danish Sudan United Mission (today Mission Africa) as a missionary in 1949. Jensen did missionary work in Nigeria from 1950 to 1960 before becoming a liaison secretary for Sudan Mission in 1962 with the task of fomenting interest in non-church circles doing missionary work. She became ordained as a chaplain at the large Church of the Holy Ghost, Copenhagen that is located in the centre of Strøget in 1965 and was made a priest between 1974 and 1995. Jensen was vice-president and member of the European board of the United Bible Societies from 1976 to 1980 and was its world chair and board member between 1980 and 1984.

== Early life ==
Jensen was born in Copenhagen on 29 December 1924. She was the daughter of the business manager Peter Martin Vibe Jensen and Marie Petersen. In 1948, Jensen graduated from Ribe State Seminar and qualified as a teacher when she passed her examination. Following about a year of educating in Copenhagen, the Danish Sudan United Mission (today Mission Africa) accepted her a missionary in 1949. To prepare for missionary work, Jensen studied theology at the University of Edinburgh and Islam and External Mission at Selly Oak Colleges in Birmingham.

== Career ==
In 1950, she began doing missionary work when she was sent to Numan in Northern Nigeria. Jensen spent six years leading the boarding school in the town and assisted in the institution becoming a high school before working as a supervisor of the American and Danish branches of the school work of Sudan mission for the following three-and-a-half-years. She advocated for higher prioritisation of theological subjects and topics such as pastoral care in the further education of missionaries. Jensen was able to form coherence between missionary work and the African identity and local distinctiveness.

The Lutheran Churches in the United States invited her in 1960 to study in the country for one year on a scholarship from the Foreign Mission Board and she chose to study at the University of Minnesota. Jensen graduated with a Master of Arts degree in Literature and Psychology in 1962 with her dissertation on the relationship between Christianity and idealism. After this, she returned to Copenhagen in mid-1962, and became employed as a liaison secretary for Sudan Mission in 1962 with the task of fomenting interest in non-church circles doing missionary work. This came after Jensen rejected offers from American universities to study there. She did qualify as a priest in the Church of Denmark after taking an examination at the University of Copenhagen in 1964 as those who are not theologians are permitted to seek priesthood under certain circumstances.

In May 1965, Jensen became ordained as a chaplain at the large Church of the Holy Ghost, Copenhagen that is located in the centre of Strøget before becoming the church's priest between 1974 and 1995. She left the church due to inclement health. In the three decades Jensen was at the church, the congregation grew, seeing about 200 to 300 from within or outside the parish regularly attending Sunday services. The church also saw the introduction of Bible study classes, child, social care and youth work for the disadvantaged and she and others visited the sick. Jensen's preaching was inspired by the works of theologians Karl Barth, N. F. S. Grundtvig. K.E. Skydsgaard and Tage Schack. Her theology was heavily oriented biblically from the bible's literary qualities as a history book that is conditioned by her general literary interests. Jensen gave emphasis on theological content and articularly expressed her tone of speech and psychological insight.

She held various positions of trust. She worked part-time as a secretary at the Danish Bible Society between 1964 and 1980. Jensen closely collaborated with the general secretary Halfdan Høgsbro, and the society's number of members rose significantly in this time. She was a vice-president and member of the European board of the United Bible Societies from 1976 to 1980 and was its world chair and board member between 1980 and 1984. Jensen was a member of the Danish Bible Society's board of directors between 1981 and 1989. Between 1964 and 1966, she was a member of the Ministry of Church Affairs' Structural Commission and the Human Rights Commission. Jensen was a member of the board of directors of the privately funded Shaare Zedek Medical Center in Jerusalem from 1964 onwards, receiving its medal of gratitude "for her support of the humanitarian work at the hospital" in 1979.

While working in Nigeria, she authored a number of books, primarily on the African human vision as well as on topics relating to Christianity and children's books. Jensen's works included Afrika Spørger (1953), Bokti – det er mig (1959), Kan man synge i sne (1980) and Hvilken farve har Guds øjne (1989). Multiple of her works have been translated into Dutch and Norwegian. She authored a wide range of articles in journals in Denmark and abroad on topics such as external missions, literature and pastoral care.

== Personal life ==
Jensen was unmarried. On 8 July 2016, she died at her home in Birkenæs, close to Jyderup in West Zealand County. Her funeral was held at the Church of the Holy Ghost, Copenhagen on the afternoon of 14 July.
