= Statue of Frederick VI =

Statue in Copenhagen

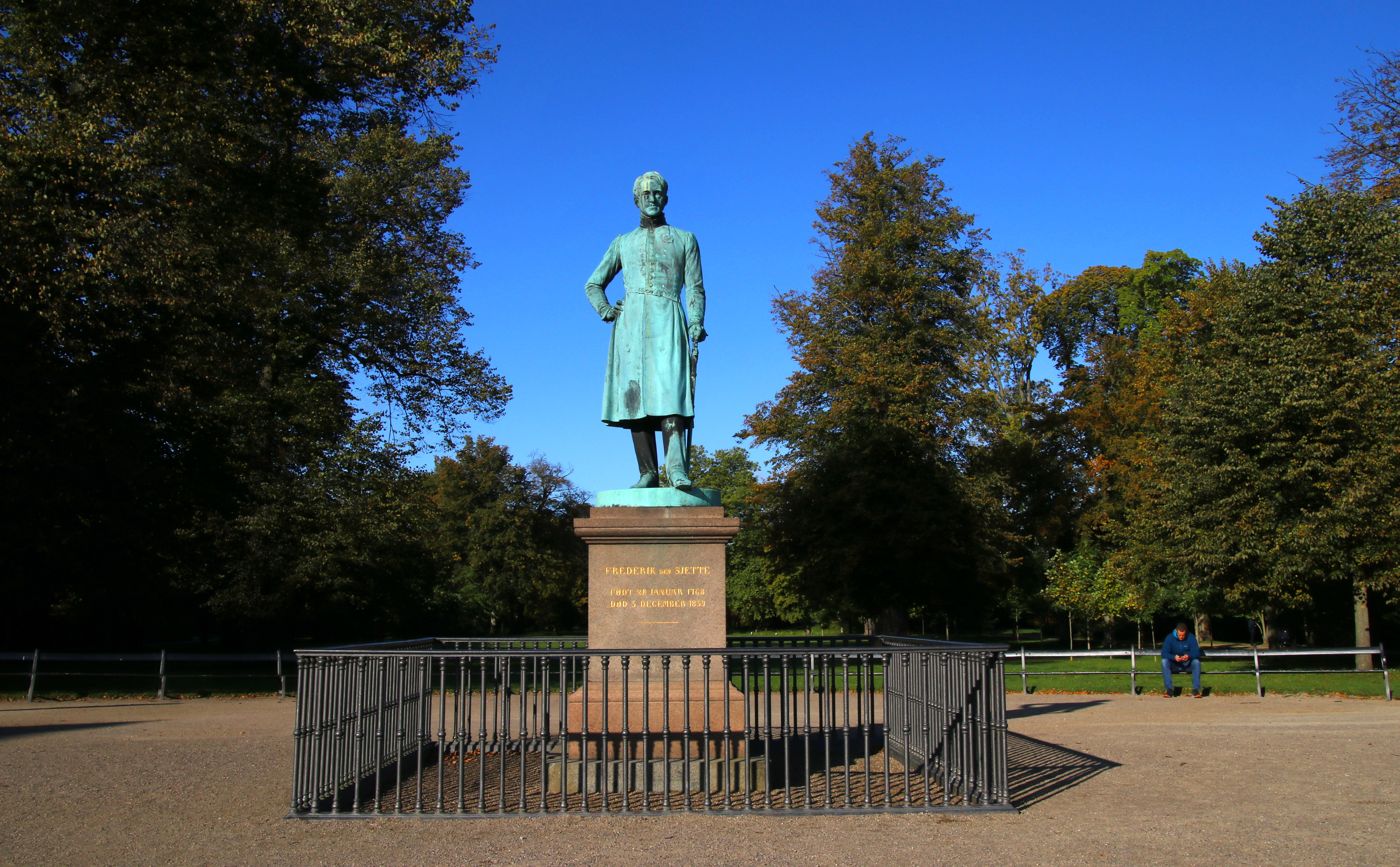
- Bronze statue of King Frederick VI at the entrance to Frederiksberg Park
- Artist: Herman Wilhelm Bissen
- Year: 1858
- Medium: Bronze
- Subject: Frederick VI
- Location: Copenhagen

The Statue of Frederick VI greets visitors just inside the main entrance to Frederiksberg Park at Frederiksberg Runddel in the Frederiksberg district of Copenhagen, Denmark. Unveiled on 10 September 1858, the bronze statue was created by Herman Wilhelm Bissen and is considered one of his best works. It is the first public depiction of a Danish monarch in everyday, contemporary attire, rather than that of antiquity, or galla uniform, popular in earlier sculpture.

== Design ==
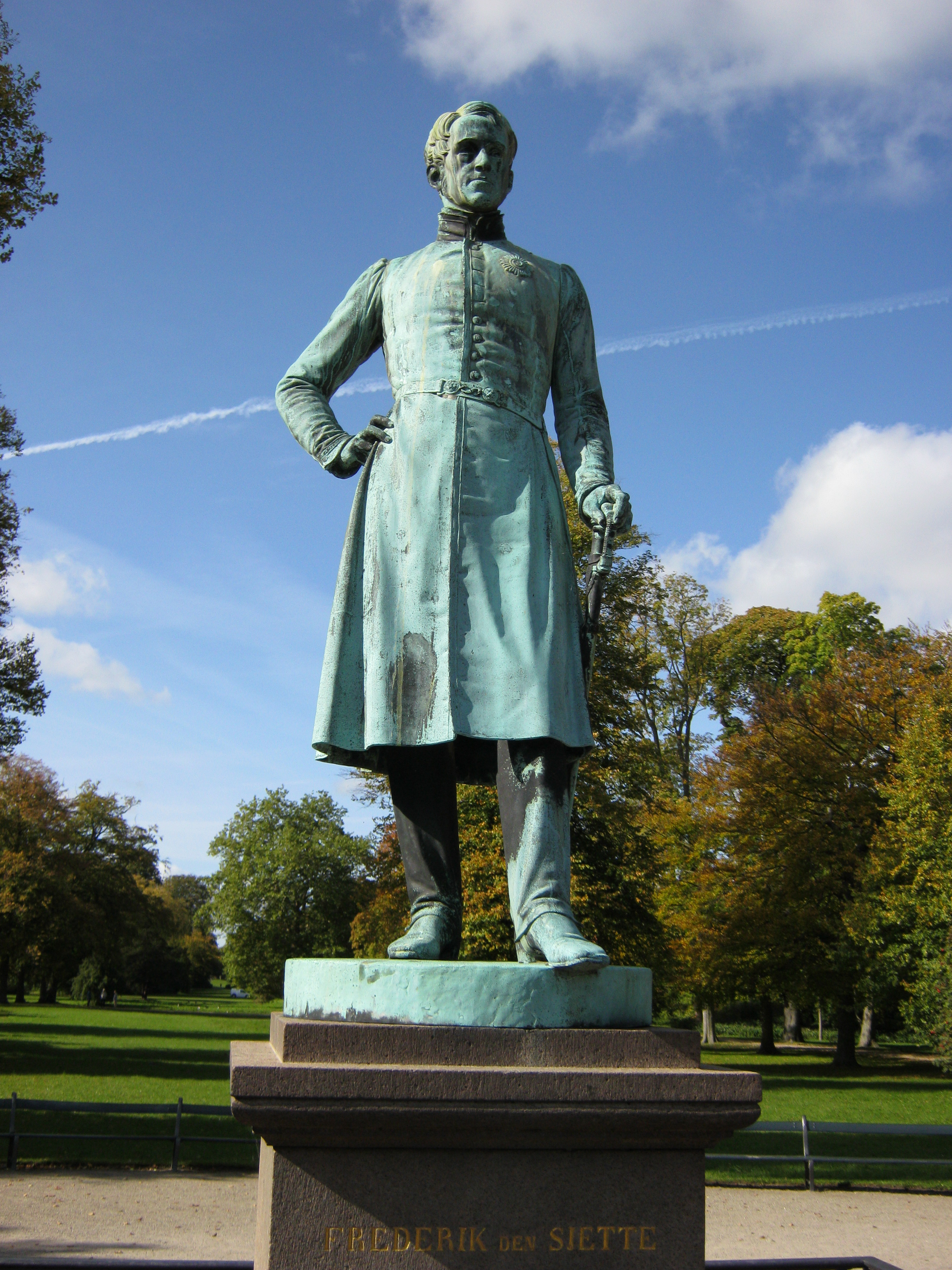
Frontal view of the statue

The statue offers a down-to-earth portrait of Frederick VI. He is not mounted on a horse and is not wearing a toga or a galla uniform as is normal in older portraits of monarchs. He is instead seen in a relaxed pose, wearing an everyday uniform with long coat and boots, with his right hand rested on his waist and the left hand on his sword. The unsentimental presentation of the king reflects his personality and relationship with the park and may also have been influenced by the recent transition from absolute to constitutional monarchy that was realized with the adoption of the Constitution of Denmark in 1849. The statue is considered one of Bissen's best works.

The inscriptions on the plinth was written by J.N. Madvig. The inscription on the front reads "Frederik den Sjette / født 28. januar 1768 / død 3. december 1839". The inscription on the rear side reads " Dette minde rejstes 1858". The inscription on the left-hand side (south) reads "Her følte han sig lykkelig i sit trofaste folks midte". The inscription on the right-hand side (north) reads "Han styrede riget som kronprins og som konge i henved 56 år".

== History ==
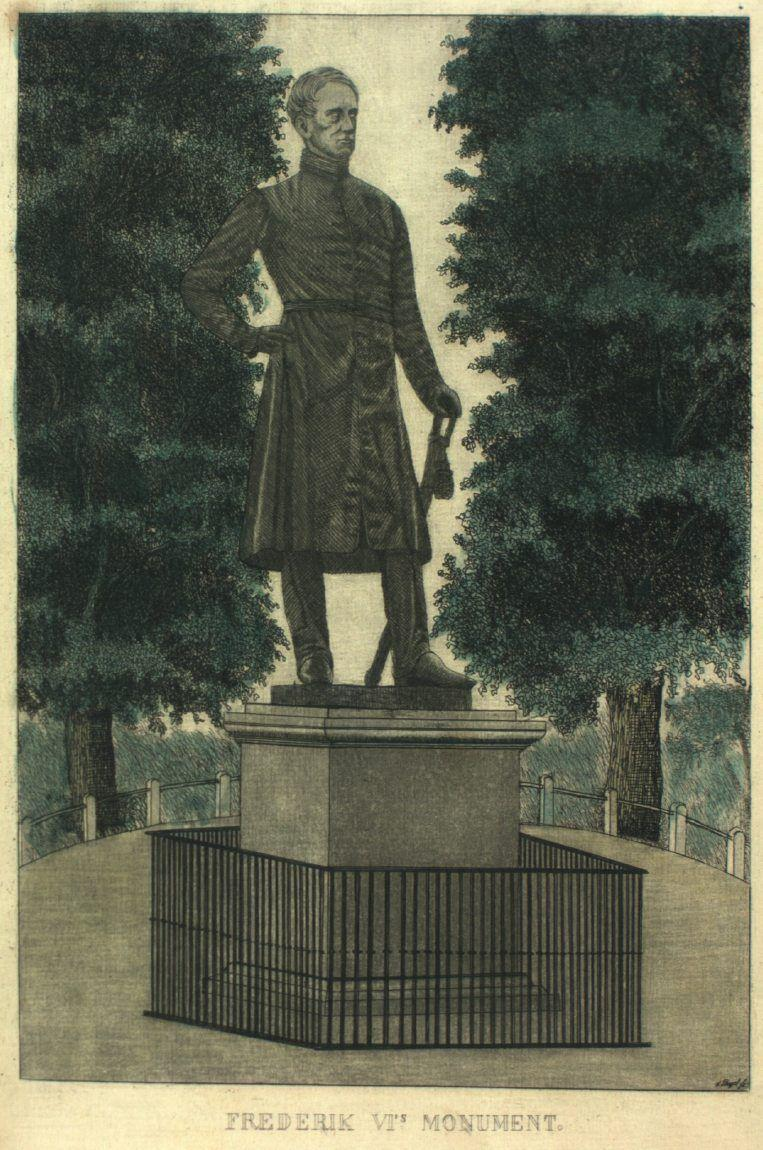
A drawing of the statue from 1959

Frederick VI died on 3 December 1839. The initial preparations of a monument to his honour had already started prior to his death. C.F. Wilckens and Just Mathias Thiele states that Bertel Thorvaldsen began to work on a monument to Frederick VI at his own initiative. It depicted the king on his throne wearing his coronation gown and was intended for a location in Rosenborg Castle Gardens. Thiele wrote to Thorvaldsen just two days after the king's death proposing an equestrian statue at Esplanaden but Thorvaldsen ignored this proposal and continued work on his Rosenborg proposal. Christian VIII did however not like Thorvaldsen's proposal and a committee headed by Jonas Collin was instead set up. A memorial concert in the Church of Our Lady was held on the one year's anniversary of the king's death to raise money for the monument but then nothing happened for several years.

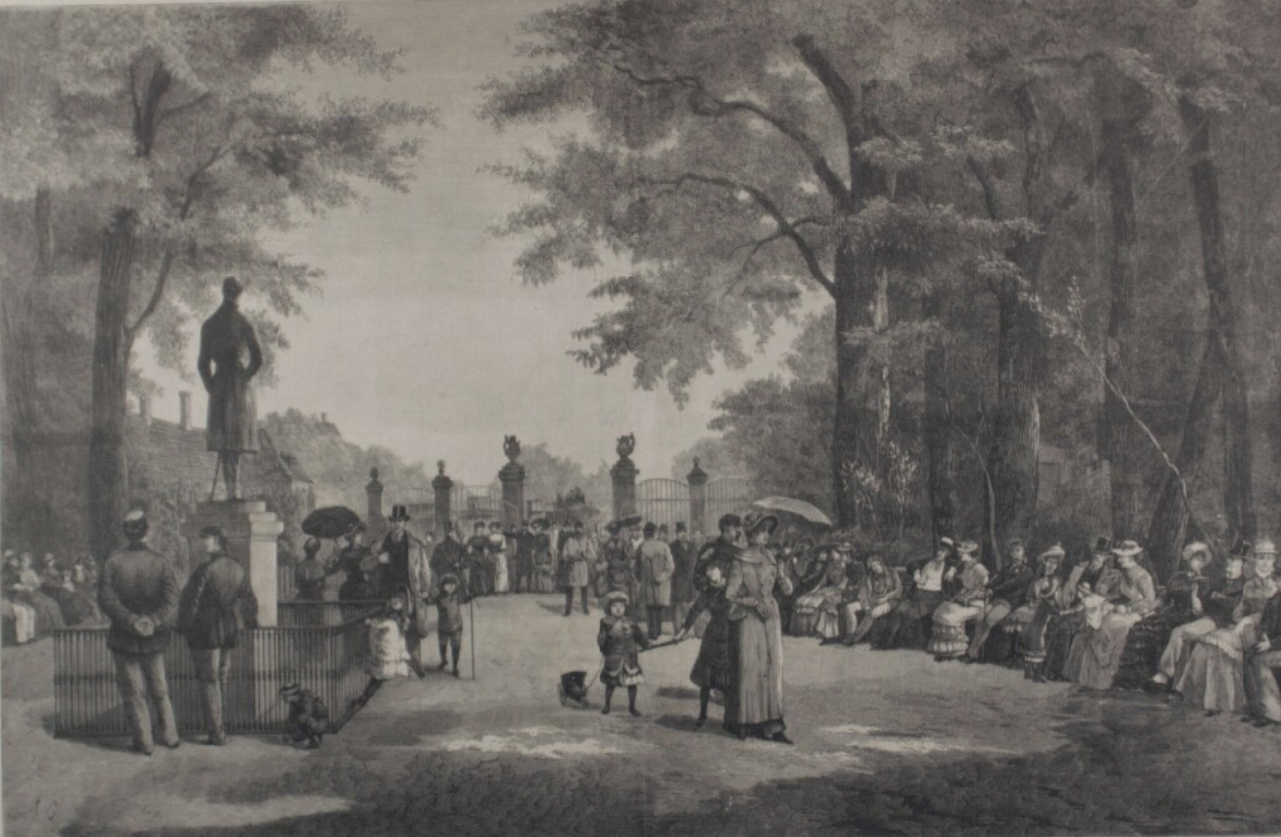
The statue seen on a print by Knud Gamborg

The committee was finally revived in 1848 after an anonymously published letter to the editor in a newspaper had brought the project back on the agenda. The money from the concert with interests had now reached 2,321 Danish rigsdaler and 90 skilling. Thorvaldsen had died in 1844 and the task of designing the monument was instead assigned to Herman Wilhelm Bissen. The final commission was not made until November 1855. Bissen presented his final design to an enthusiastic committee on 17 September 1857 but a decision on where to place it had by then still not been taken. Jonas Collin was in favour of a location in front of Thorvaldsens Museum while other proposals included Rosenborg Castle Gardens, Esplanaden and Christiansborg Slotsplads. In the end, Bissen, who had created the statue with a location at the entrance to Frederiksberg Park in mind, did however manage to convince the committee that this was the right location.

on 10 September 1858, the monument was finally unveiled in the presence of Frederick VII.

== In media and culture ==
The statue is seen on the 1932 Royal Copenhagen Christmas plate. The plate was designed by Oluf Jensen.

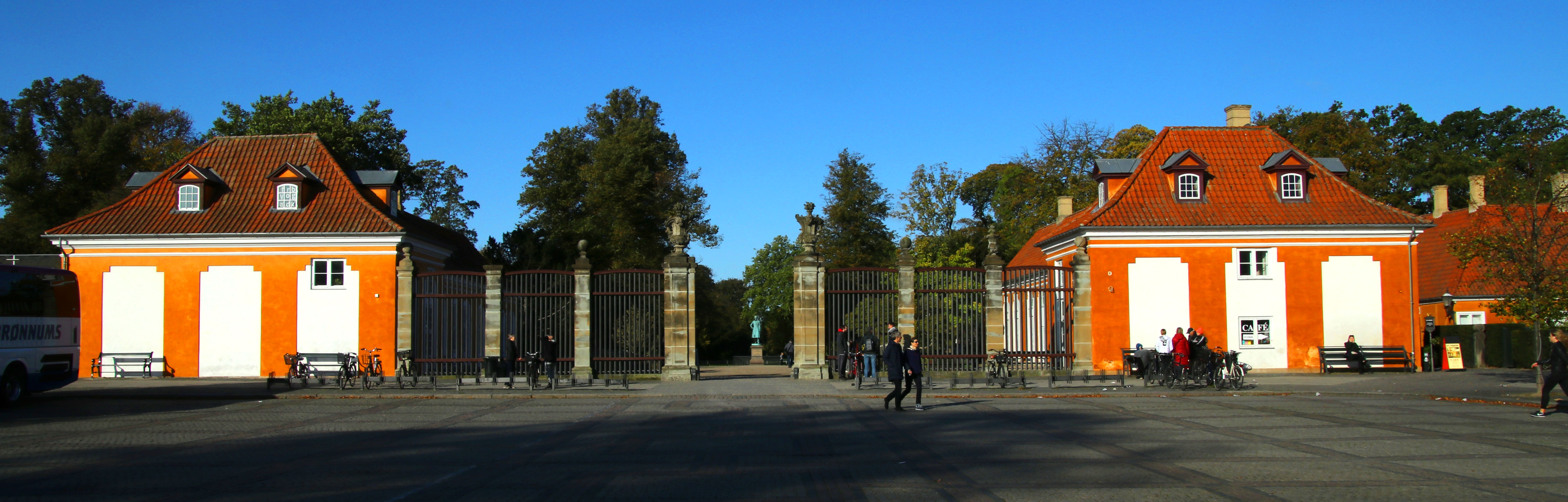
The statue seen from Frederiksberg Runddel through the main entrance to Frederiksberg Gardens
