= Carl Nicolai Starcke =

Danish sociologist, politician, educator and philosopher (1858–1926)

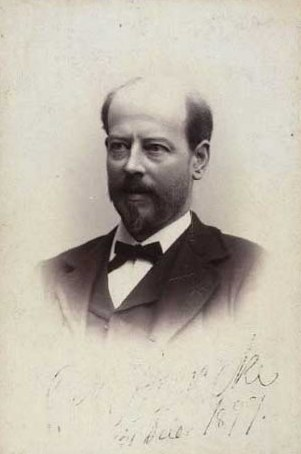
Starcke

Carl Nicolai Starcke (29 March 1858, Copenhagen – 7 March 1926, Copenhagen) was a Danish sociologist, politician, educator and philosopher. He is buried at Holmens Cemetery. He was the father of Viggo Starcke, another writer and publisher of books such as Denmark in World History.

== Life ==
Starcke graduated in 1883 with a thesis on Feuerbach. In 1916 he was against the resistance of Harald Høffding, a professor of philosophy at the University of Copenhagen. His first political party he joined was Venstre, a liberal party. In 1905 he co-founded the social-liberal party Det Radikale Venstre. He was dissatisfied with the party and therefore started the establishment of Danmarks Retsforbund in 1919. From 1913 to 1916 he was chairman of the Henry George fora ingen.

== Education ==
In 1899 Starcke founded Det Danske Selskabs Skole (English: The Danish Society School), the first free high school in Europe. It closed again in 1911, just 12 years after it was opened.

== Work ==
=== Family sociology ===
Starcke published a book named Die primitive Familie in ihrer Entstehung und Entwickelung in 1888. In it, he examined the social structures of different populations in Africa, Asia and Australia, and compared them with each other.

Starcke wrote about this book:

The purpose of my work is to identify the primitive family and the ideas on which it is built, and the germs of moral growth, it contains evidence.

=== Comparative method ===
Starcke speculation turned against the construction of history and wants it by the application of the comparative method to replace. He is against a misunderstanding of this method:

Same legends and myths, like Social institutions, customs and traditions, we can not interpret this as testimony to common origin, because such similarities may be due to causes that can occur quite independently in several places and at different times into being.

According to Starcke, the comparative method can not be a common origin, but close to the same conditions.

=== Source criticism ===
He grappled with the quality of the source material, and explores the question of why authors come from the same sources to different results.

Starcke distinguished four categories of sources:

- direct historical accounts of the development of a particular community during a certain period
- travel stories
- written down old laws and customs
- ancient myths and legends and archaeological reports

He points to the problem circuits to interpolate to periods for which there are no sources.

== Bibliography ==
Most of these books were written in his native language Danish, but there are French and English translations available for several. Listed chronologically.

- Starcke, Carl Nikolai (1885). Ludwig Feuerbach.
- Starcke, Carl Nikolai (1888). Die primitive Familie in ihrer Entstehung und Entwickelung. Leipzig, Brockhaus.
- Starcke, Carl Nikolai (1889). Etikens teoretiske grundlag.
- Starcke, Carl Nikolai (1890). Skepticismen som led i de aandelige bevægelser siden reformationen.
- Starcke, Carl Nikolai (1894). Samvittighedslivet; en fremstilling af principerne for menneskeligt samfundsliv. København.
- Starcke, Carl Nikolai (1899). La famille dans les différentes sociétés. V. Giard & E. Brière.
- Starcke, Carl Nikolai (1911). Freimaurerei als Lebenskunst.
- Starcke, Carl Nikolai (1912). Personlighedens moral og de moralske problemer i nutiden.
- Starcke, Carl Nikolai (1913). Die Freimaurerei, ihre geschichtliche Entwicklung und kulturelle Bedeutung bei den verschiedenen Völkern.
- Starcke, Carl Nikolai (1914). Verdenskrigen; hvorfor kom den, hvortil fører den.
- Starcke, Carl Nikolai (1916). Psykologi.
- Starcke, Carl Nikolai (1918). Typer af den filosofiske Tænknings Historie.
- Starcke, Carl Nikolai (1920). Den sociale uro og den evige fred.
- Starcke, Carl Nikolai (1923). Baruch de Spinoza.
- Starcke, Carl Nikolai (1927). Lovene for samfundsudviklingen og de sociale idealer.
