= Rasmus Nellemann =

Danish painter and illustrator

Rasmus Nellemann (2 March 1923 – 4 September 2004) was a Danish painter and illustrator. He is remembered in particular for his many abstract postage stamp designs.

== Biography ==
Born in Millinge near Fåborg on the island of Funen, Nellemann was introduced to art at the Odense Technical School before attending the Royal Danish Academy of Fine Arts (1948–53) where he studied painting under Aksel Jørgensen and Vilhelm Lundstrøm and graphic arts under Holger Jensen.

In 1950, Nellemann exhibited six paintings of Millinge at the Artists Autumn Exhibition (Kunstnernes Efterårsudstilling) but soon concentrated on graphic arts, initially lithography, then etching. His illustrations were in a simple abstract style, full of straight lines. He also designed many postage stamps from 1960 to 1992, becoming Denmark's most productive artist in the field with 32 different designs.

Nellemannn was also a ceramist, applying his Constructivist approach to ceramic reliefs for the Bygholm agricultural school near Horsens and Ledøje-Smørum's town hall.

== Awards ==
In 1974, Nellemann was awarded the Eckersberg Medal and, in 1986, the Thorvaldsen Medal.

== Literature ==
- Kastrugårdsamling (2003). Rasmus Nellemann: grafiske værker. Faaborg Museum. ISBN 978-87-88686-11-1.
- Levende form: Dan Sterup-Hansen, Rasmus Nellemann, Palle Nielsen, Bent Sørensen. Charlottenborg. 1 January 1994. ISBN 978-87-88944-19-8.
