= Charlotte Eilersgaard =

Danish writer and women's rights activist

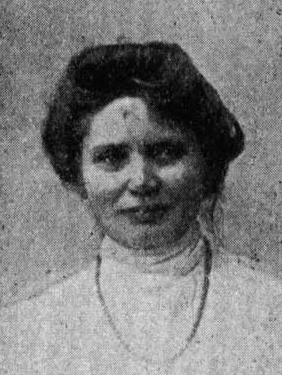
Charlotte Eilersgaard

Charlotte Juliane Sofie Eilersgaard née Jensen (25 March 1858–9 May 1922) was a Danish writer and editor who wrote short stories, plays and novels. From the beginning of the 20th century, she became increasingly involved in the women's movement, especially the cause for women's voting rights.

== Biography ==
Born on 25 March 1858 in Hjørring, Charlotte Juliane Sofie Hansen was the daughter of the cattle dealer Lars Møller Jensen (1829–1905) and Anna Katrine Mettelmann (1831–1920). As a child, she was already a keen poet, filling her drawers with her own works. After attending a girls' school in Hjørring and learning languages at home, when she was 20 she married the editor Jacob Peter Martinus Julius Eilersgaard (1855–1905).

As an author, she wrote mainly epic novels and plays, many of which were performed in Copenhagen or in Denmark's larger cities. One of the most successful was Jægermesterinden which was first published as a novel in 1907 but was then dramatised for Folketeatret. It tells the story of a young woman who persuades her parents, a hunter and a housekeeper, to resolve their family problems by getting married.

Her work as an editor began in 1898 when the couple moved to Middelfart where she edited the Aarup Avis. She joined the Red Cross, heading the local women's branch. In 1903, she became president of the Middelfart branch of the newly established Danish Women's Society (Dansk Kvindesamfund) where she promoted voting rights as the organization's main concern. She was therefore somewhat concerned when the National Association for Women's Suffrage (Landsforbundet for Kvinders Valgret) established a local chapter there.

In 1904, she attended the International Council of Women's conference in Berlin where she presented a paper on Die Frauenbewegung in Skandinavien. When Denmark granted women the vote in 1915, unlike Gyrithe Lemche, she supported the integration of women into the existing political parties rather than creating new ones specially for women.

For the rest of her life, Charlotte Eilersgaard continued to publish a play or a novel each year, some of which were translated into other languages. She died on 9 May 1922 in Helsingør's old people's home Montebello. She is buried in Middelfart.
