= Adolf Heinrich-Hansen =

Danish architectural painter

Adolf Heinrich Claus Hansen (29 November 1859- 28 October 1925) known as Adolf Heinrich-Hansen, was a Danish architectural painter. His father, Heinrich Hansen, was also an architectural painter. Late in his life, he turned to animal painting.

== History ==
Adolf Heinrich-Hansen was born in Copenhagen, the son of architectural painter and later professor Heinrich Hansen and Margrethe Elisabeth Burmeister. He studied theology for four years at the University of Copenhagen before deciding to follow in his father's footsteps.

He had probably already worked as an assistant to his father. He studied at C.F. Andersens's sketching school and at the Royal Danish Academy of Fine Arts from 1883 to 1886. He received a travel grant from the Carlsberg Foundation in 1890. He had had his debut at the Charlottenborg Exhibition in 1885 and exhibited there until 1909. He was also represented at the Nordic Exhibition in 1888 and at the World Rxhibitions in Paris in 1889 and Chicago in 1893 and exhibited in Berlin in 1783–96 and in Munich in 1899. Den Frie Udstilling hosted a special exhibition of his works in 1911.

In the 1890s, he taught perspective both at the Art School for Women and the Academy. He visited Germany, Belgium, Italy and Normandy.

== Works ==
Heinrich-Hansen's works include architectural paintings of churches and castles, especially their interiors. He also painted cityscapes, especially from historic Herman town centres. He also worked on the island of Fanø, painting interiors with women in traditional clothes. He also painted a few portraits. Late in his life, he turned to animal painting, specializing in horses and dogs.

== Personal life ==
Heinrich-Hansen married Karen Margrethe Leuning, daughter of the later Minister of Justice Carl Peter Gram Leuning. They divorced in 1917 and he later married Ellen Marie Irene Kretzschmer.

== Gallery ==
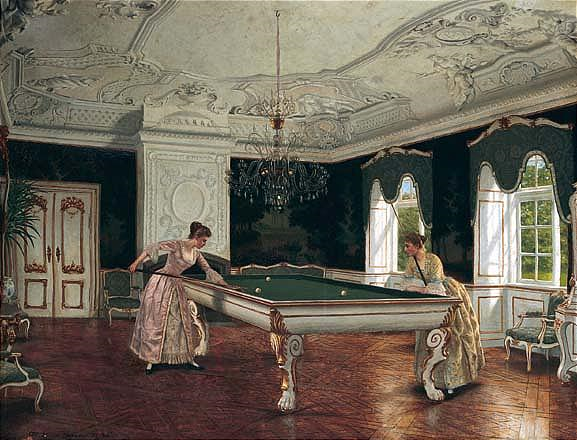
women playing billiards (1895)

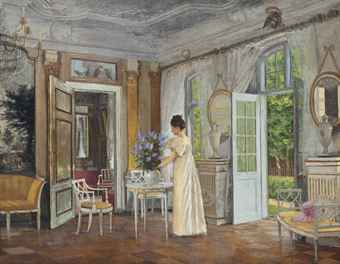
Arranging Summer blooms (1899)

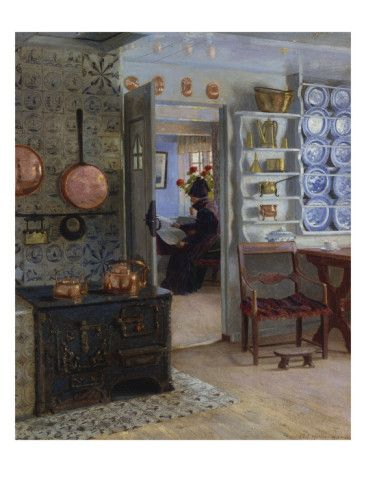
A Woman Reading in an Interior

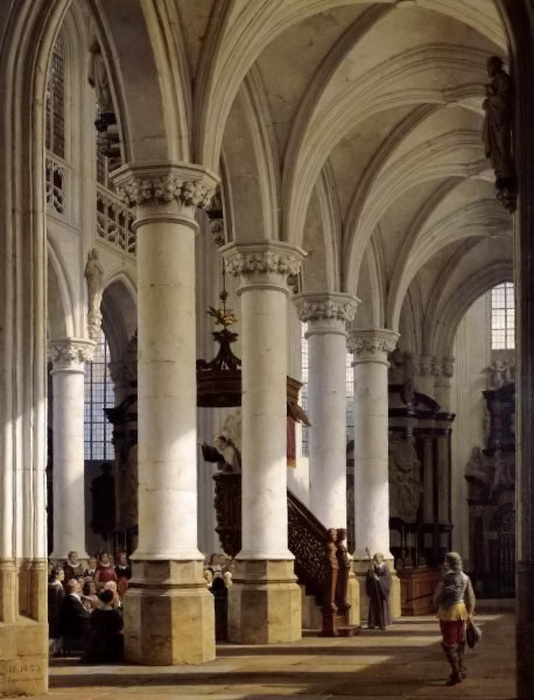

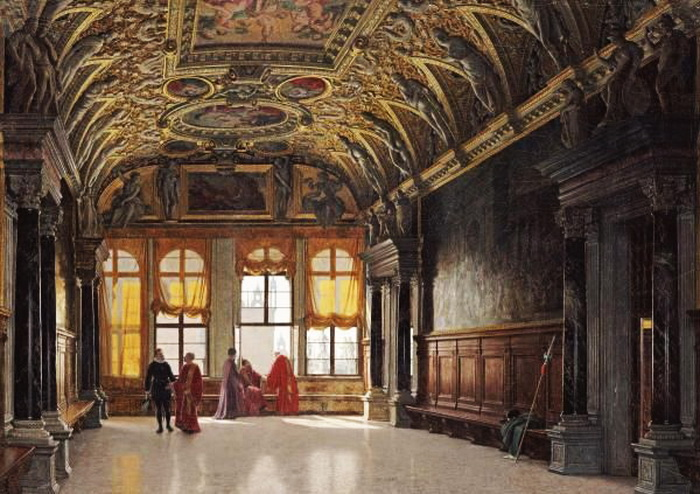

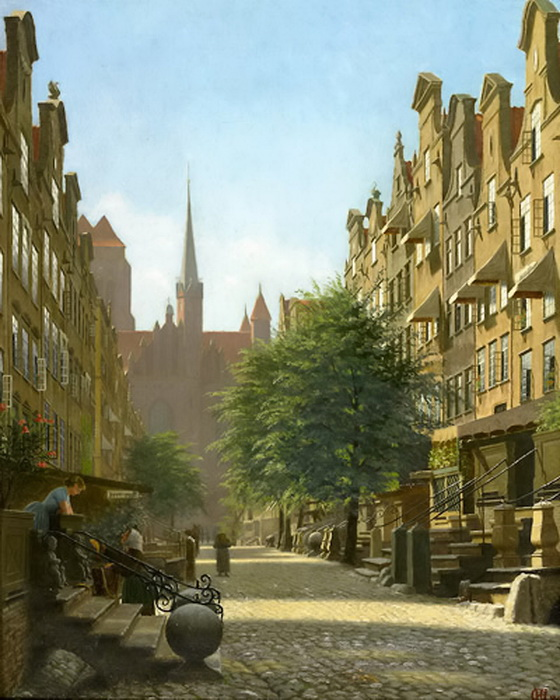
German cityscape

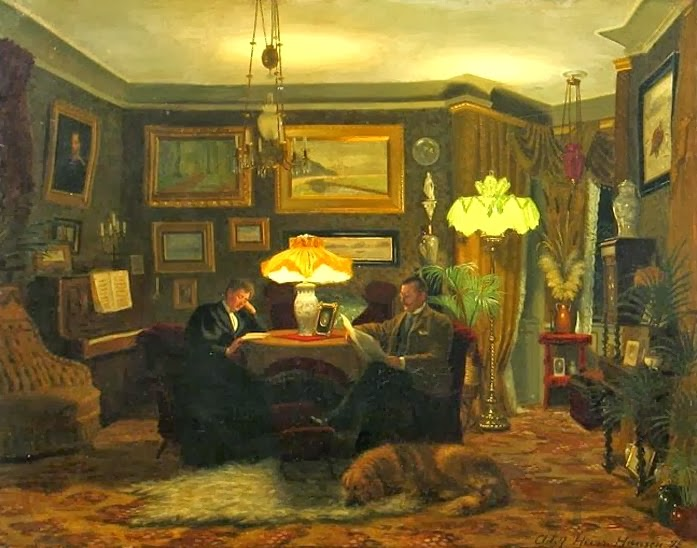
Interior

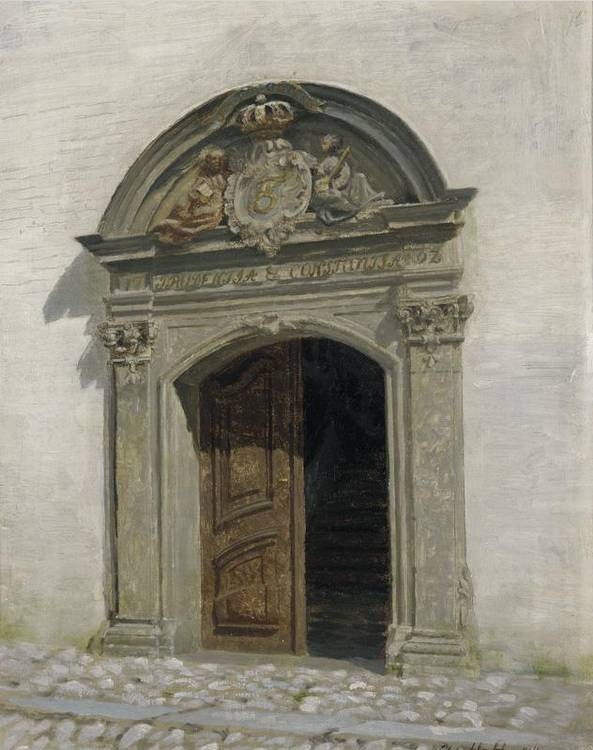
Interior
