= Jørgen Rømer =

Danish art historian, graphic artist and painter (1923–2007)

Jørgen Kofoed Rømer (9 May 1923 – 1 July 2007) was a Danish art historian, graphic artist and painter.

== Biography ==
Born in Sæby near Frederikshavn, Rømer studied the history of art at Copenhagen University from 1943 to 1952 but was self-taught as an artist. Together with Richard Winther, from 1957 he created a series of graphic experiments at the Royal Danish Academy of Fine Arts, initially in connection with research into the technique adopted by the 17th-century Dutch artist Hercules Seghers.

From 1946 to 1992, Rømer worked for Statens Kunsthistoriske Fotografisamling (Danish Art Historical Photographic Collection) and from 1974 he was also research librarian at the Art Academy Library. He developed his own artistic idiom inspired by his association with the experimental Eks-skolen. Miniature organic motifs provide an interpretation of nature's smallest constituents in carefully detailed drawings, prints and watercolours. He was particularly interested in etching as a medium as it allowed him to work with contrast between black and white. Together with Winther, he attempted to adopt the techniques used by the old masters. However, as his health began to suffer from the fluids used in etching, he turned instead to drawing and watercolour.

== Awards ==
In 1986, Rømer was awarded the Eckersberg Medal and in 2006 the Thorvaldsen Medal.

== Literature ==
- Katz, Janina; Klint, Le (1992). Jørgen Rømer: akvareller. Silkeborg Kunstmuseum. ISBN 978-87-87932-34-9.
- Mathiesen, Eske K. (2005). Jørgen Rømer. Akvareller. Archived from the original on 2018-05-16.
- Kirkeby Andersen, Dorte (2012). Jørgen Rømer. Grafik. Archived from the original on 2018-05-16.
