= Iørn Piø =

Danish historian (1927–1998)

- Born: 24 August 1927
- Died: 16 February 1998 (aged 70)
- Occupation: Historian

Iørn Piø (24 August 1927 – 16 February 1998) was a Danish folklorist, historian, and archivist.

After becoming a student at the Metropolitan School in Copenhagen in 1946, Iørn Piø studied Danish and Nordic Philology at the University of Copenhagen. Through his study, he came into contact with the Danish People's Mind Collection, and was hired as an assistant in 1955. After taking a Master's Conference in 1960 using the thesis of The Production of Danish partisans between 1770 and 1821, and contemporary views on the genre, Piø was hired as an archivist at the Folklore Connection.

Piø became a Doctor of Philosophy with New Approaches to the Ballad in 1985 about his theory of many folk songs that were believed to be from the Middle Ages actually originated from the 1500s to the 1800s. In 1987, he received the Danish Writers Association Nonfiction Prize for his work in disseminating scientific research to a wider audience.
