= Kristine Marie Jensen =

Danish housekeeper and cookbook writer

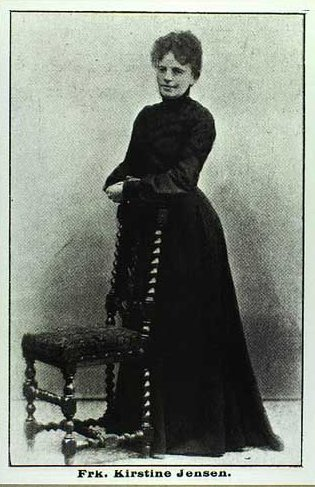
Kristine Marie Jensen

Kristine Marie Jensen, better known in Denmark as Frøken Jensen, (1858–1923) was a Danish housekeeper and cookbook writer. She is remembered in particular as the author of the early Danish cookbook Frøken Jensens Kogebog ("Miss Jensen's Cookbook"), which has been popular for its traditional recipes since its publication in 1901.

== Background ==
The popularity of Jensen's cookbooks is in part a result of the interest in gastronomy in 19th-century Denmark at a time when wholesome ingredients had not yet given way to the effects of industrialization. Jensen was by no means the first Dane to author a cookbook. As early as 1837, Anne Marie Mangor (1781–1865) had published her Kogebog for smaa Husholdninger (Cookbook for Small Households). Inspired by French and international dishes, the Copenhagen restaurateur, Louise Nimb (1842–1903), wrote the highly successful Fru Nimbs Kogbog in 1888. At the beginning of the 1890s, writing under the pseudonym of Fru Constantin, Mathilde Muus (1852–1935) was also beginning to publish her recipes in housekeeping journals.

== Biography ==
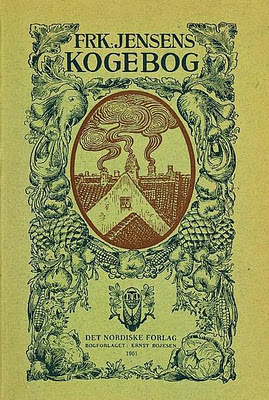
Cover of Frk. Jensens Kogbog, 1st edition

Born on 17 July 1858 in Randers, Jensen was the daughter of Christian Jensen, a hauler, and Petrine Sørensen. Orphaned at the age of seven, she grew up in the care of her grandmother. On leaving school, she went to Copenhagen where she took a course at N. Zahle's School before spending a year in England.

In 1890, she became a housekeeper for Jørgen Conradt Melchior, a recently widowed headmaster with five children. The family lived in Copenhagen's Nørregade, close to Melchior's school. When the school ran into difficulties and closed in 1908, Jensen remained as part of the family, acting as a foster mother for the youngest son, Lauritz Melchior. Partly thanks to her support for his singing lessons, he was later to become a famous opera singer.

Jensen published her first and most famous cookbook in 1901. Titled Frøken Jensens Kogbog (Miss Jensen's Cookbook), it ran into a second edition the same year. In 1902, she published Frøken Jensens Syltebog (Miss Jensen's Pickling Book) followed by Five o'clock tea which contained a number of bread and cake recipes she had brought back from England. She went on to publish Hvad skal vi ha’ til Middag (What should we have for Dinner, 1903), Husholdningsbog (Housekeeping Book, 1904), Grønt- og Frugtretter (Vegetable and Fruit Dishes, 1906), Sommer- og Vinter Dessert (Summer and Winter Desserts, 1916) and Svampe paa 100 Maader (Mushrooms in a 100 Ways, 1916). She also contributed articles to newspapers and magazines.

Frøken Jensens Kogbog is considered by many Danes to contain all the authentic recipes for traditional dishes as well as for baking bread, cakes and biscuits. It has been reprinted dozens of times and new editions can be found in most Danish bookshops today. When Danes prepare meals for special occasions, for example at Christmas time, they frequently follow Frøken Jensen's detailed descriptions. The cookbook, which was reprinted 27 times during Jensen's lifetime, is to be found in almost every Danish kitchen to this day. In Denmark, the only Danish author to have outsold her is Hans Christian Andersen. Over a million copies of the work have now been sold.

Kristine Marie Jensen died on 7 February 1923 in Copenhagen. She is buried in Holmens Cemetery.
