= 1900 in Denmark =

- Decades: 1880s; 1890s; 1900s; 1910s; 1920s
- See also: Other events of 1900; List of years in Denmark

The following lists events that happened during 1900 in the Kingdom of Denmark.

== Incumbents ==
- Monarch – Christian IX
- Prime minister – Hugo Egmont Hørring (until 27 April), Hannibal Sehested (council president)

== Events ==
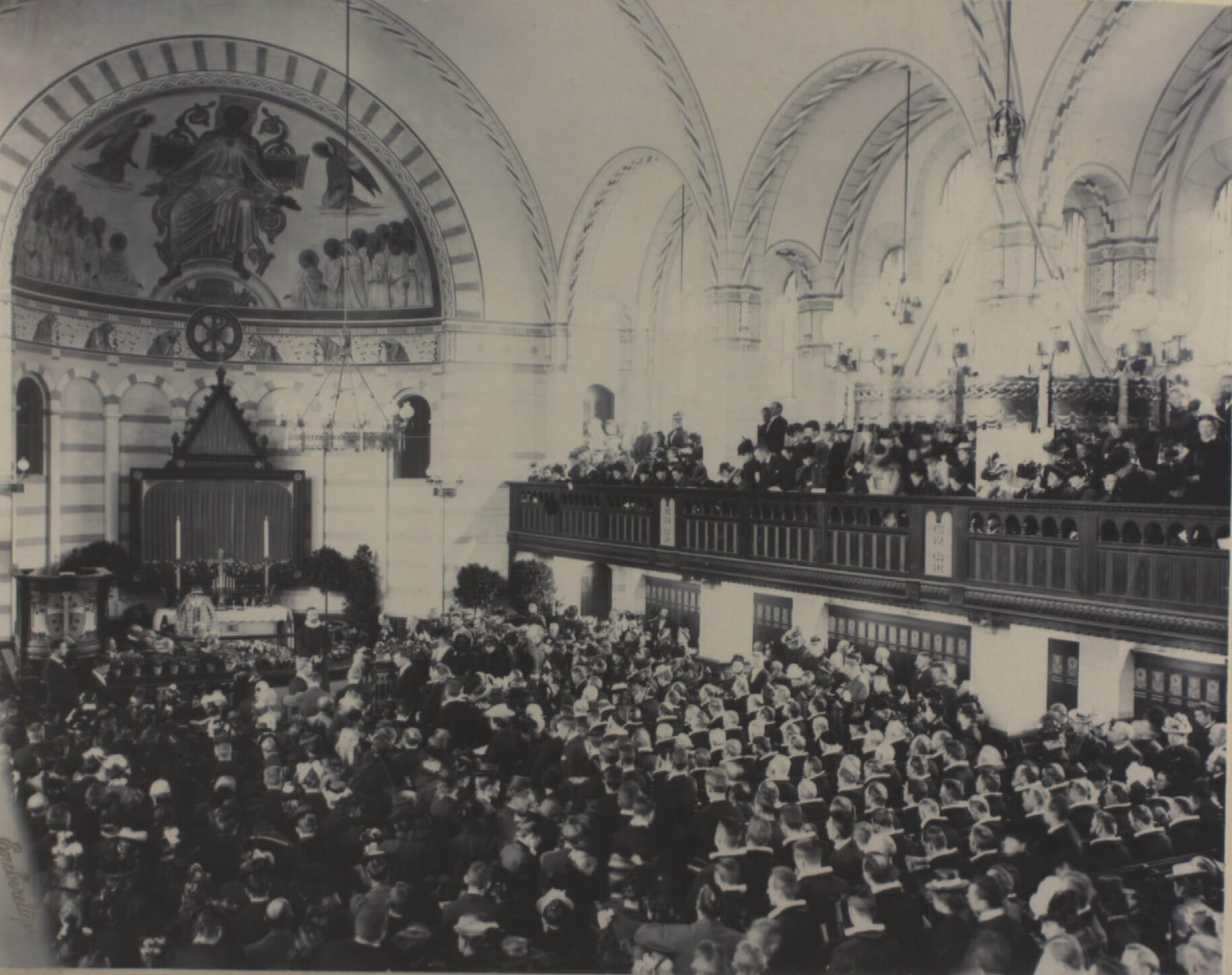
6 May; The inauguration of Christ Church.

- 27 April — The Cabinet of Sehested is formed by Hannibal Sehested of the conservative party after Hugo Egmont Hørring's resignation as Council President.
- 6 May – The Christ Church on Enghave Plads in Copenhagen is inaugurated.
- 8 May — Sankt Lukas Stiftelsen is founded by Isabelle Brockenhuus-Løwenhielm and pastor Vilhelm Kold from Indre Mission.
- 18 May — The Danish Unitarian Church Society is founded as Det Fri Kirkesamfund.

== Sports ==
- 2 July – Boldklubben Union is founded.
- 10 December – Hellerup IK is founded.

== Births ==
=== January–March ===
- 15 January – William Heinesen, author (died 1991)
- 6 February – Gerda Bengtsson, textile artist (died 1995)
- 14 March – Peter Bang, engineer (died 1957)

=== April–June ===
- 11 April – Kai Normann Andersen, composer and film score composer (d. 1967)
- 6 May – Vilhelm Hansen, cartoonist and illustrator (d. 1992)
- 8 May – Harald Salomon, medallist and sculptor (d. 1990)
- 16 May – Aage Winther-Jørgensen, actor (d. 1967)

=== July–September ===
- 23 July – Inger Margrethe Boberg, folklore researcher and writer (d. 1957)
- 27 July – Knud, Hereditary Prince of Denmark (d. 1976)
- 8 September – Alice O'Fredericks, film director (d. 1968)

=== October–December ===
- 29 November – Jørgen-Frantz Jacobsen, author (d. 1938)

== Deaths ==
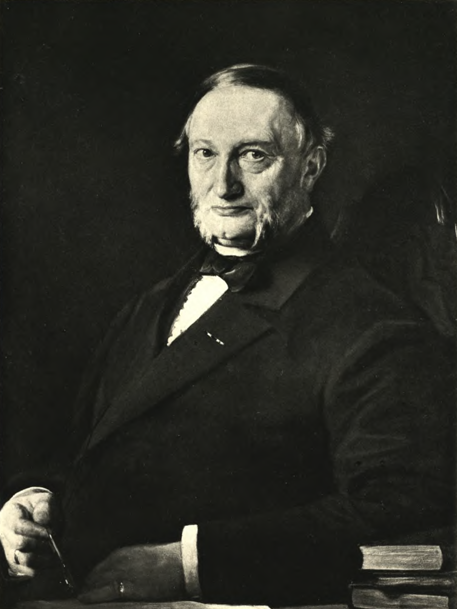
Carl Christian Vilhelm Liebe.

=== January–March ===
- 4 February – Albert Schou, photographer (b. 1849)
- 1 March – Edvard Helsted, composer (b. 1816)
- 10 March – Johan Peter Emilius Hartmann, composer (b. 1805)

=== April–June ===
- 9 May – Carit Etlar, author (b. 1816)
- 29 May – Carl Lange, physician and psychologist (b. 1834)

=== July–September ===
- 16 August – Nicolai Reimer Rump, politician (born 1834)
- 24 August – Carl Christian Vilhelm Liebe, lawyer and politician (died 1820)

=== October–December ===
- 18 June – Johan Kjeldahl, chemist (b. 1849)
- 25 December – Holger Hvidtfeldt Jerichau, painter (b. 1861)
- 20 December – Georg Petersen, businessman (born 1820)
