= 1908 in Denmark =

- Decades: 1880s; 1890s; 1900s; 1910s; 1920s
- See also: Other events of 1908; List of years in Denmark

The following lists events that happened during 1908 in Denmark.

== Incumbents ==
- Monarch – Frederick VIII
- Prime minister – J. C. Christensen (until 12 October), Niels Neergaard

== Events ==
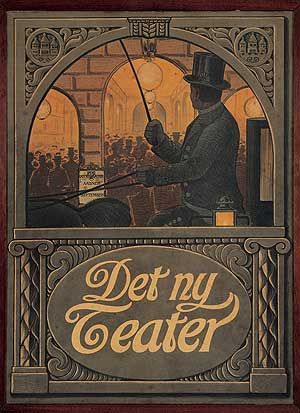
Poster from the opening of Det Ny Teater

- 14 June – Gefion Fountain inaugurated at Langelinie in Copenhagen.
- 23 August – The Denmark expedition returns to Copenhagen.
- 8 September – Former Minister of Justice Peter Adler Alberti turns himself in to the police for embezzlement of DKK 18 million (roughly DKK 1 billion as of 2006).
- 19 September – Det Ny Teater opens in Copenhagen as the second largest theatre in the country.
- 20 October – Skagen Museum is founded in the dining room at Brøndums Hotel in Skagen with the ambition to collect works by the Skagen Painters and raise funds for the construction of a building for their exhibition.

=== Undated ===
- Labour shortage begin to occur and the emigration to the United States almost stops.

== Sports ==
- 24 May – Boldklubben 1908 is founded.
- 24 August – Thorvald Ellegaard wins gold in men's sprint at the 1908 UCI Track Cycling World Championships.

== Births ==
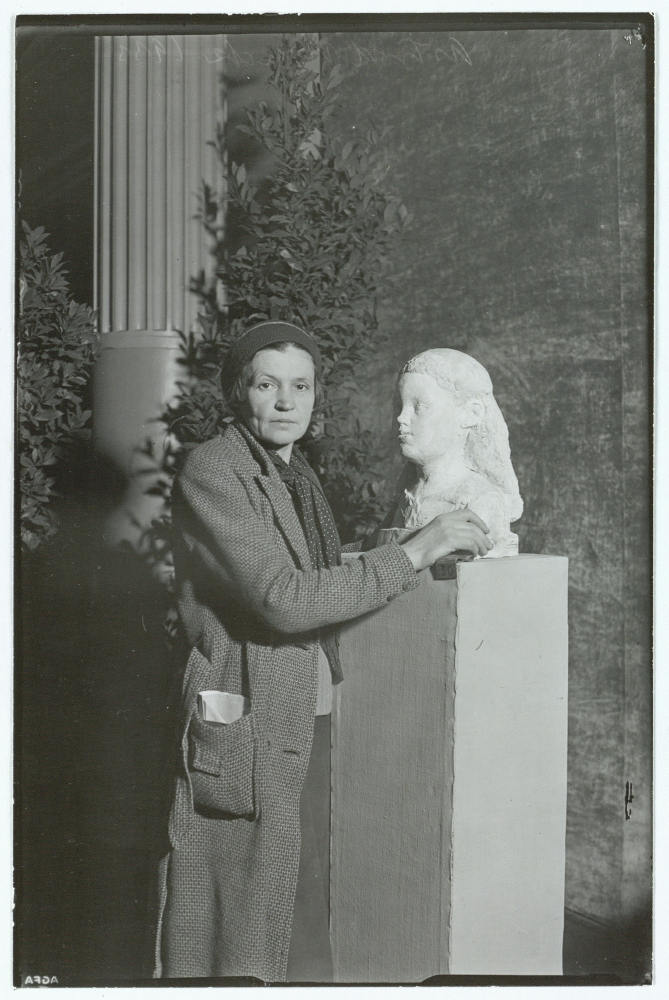
Karl Skytte.

=== January–March ===
- 30 January – Astrid Noack, sculptor (died 1954)
- 31 March – Karl Skytte, politician (d. 1986)

=== April–June ===
- 12 May – Gunnar Strømvad, actor (d. 1972)
- 31 May – Sigfred Johansen, actor (d. 1953)

=== July–September ===
- 7 July – Ellen Andersen, textile artist (died 1989)

=== October–December ===
- 1 October – Herman David Koppel, composer (d. 1998)
- 6 October – Bjarne Henning-Jensen, film director (d. 1995)
- 17 October – Svend Olsen, weightlifter (died 1980)
- 22 October – Ole Monty, actor (d. 1977)
- 23 October – Urban Hansen, politician, Lord Mayor of Copenhagen (d. 1986)

== Deaths ==
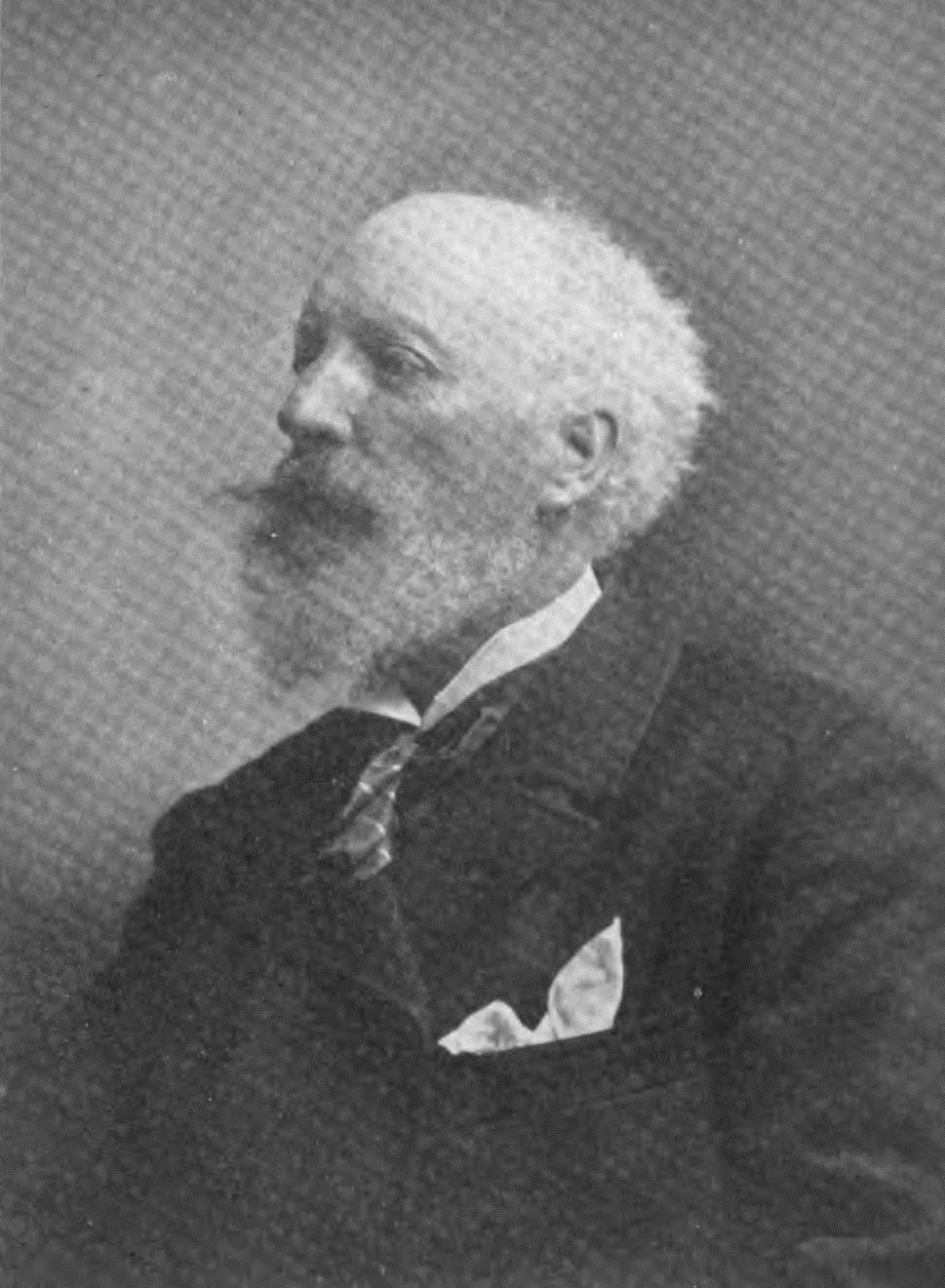
Holger Drachmann.

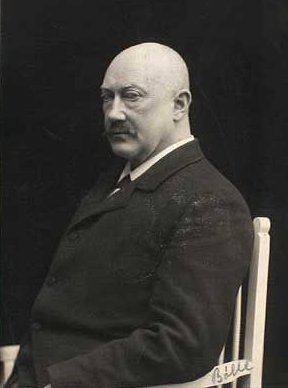
Thorvald Bindesbøll.

=== January–March ===
- 14 January – Holger Drachmann, poet, painter (born 1846)
- 3 February – Ferdinand Meldahl, architect (born 1827)
- 20 March – Frants Henningsen, painter (born 1850)

=== July–September ===
- 27 August – Thorvald Bindesbøll, architect, designer (born 1846)

=== October–December ===
- 20 October – Emil Blichfeldt, architect (born 1849)
- 26 October – Lorenz Frølich, painter and graphic artist (born 1820)
- 1 November – Christian Conrad Sophus Danneskiold-Samsøe, landowner and theatre director (born 1836)
- 8 November – Heinrich Hirschsprung, lawyer, businessman and patron (born 1836)
- 2 December – * Bernhard Hertz, silversmith (born 1834)
