= 1993 in Denmark =

- Decades: 1970s; 1980s; 1990s; 2000s; 2010s
- See also: Other events of 1993; List of years in Denmark

The following is a list of events that occurred in the year 1993 in Denmark.

== Incumbents ==
- Monarch - Margrethe II
- Prime minister - Poul Schlüter (until January 25), Poul Nyrup Rasmussen

== Sports ==
=== Badminton ===
- Lillerød BK wins Europe Cup.
- 17–21 March – Jon Holst-Christensen and Thomas Lund win gold in men's double and Jon Holst-Christensen and Grete Mogensen win gold in mixed double at the 1993 All England Open Badminton Championships.
- 31 May – 6 June – Denmark wins one gold medal, one silver medal and two bronze medals at the 1993 IBF World Championships.

=== Cycling ===
- 18 April — Rolf Sørensen wins the Liège–Bastogne–Liège classic road cycling race.
- 1 May — Rolf Sørensen wins the Eschborn-Frankfurt City Loop.
- July 3–25 — 1993 Tour de France
  - 8 July – Jesper Skibby wins the 5th stage.
  - 10 July — Bjarne Riis wins the 7th stage.
  - July 25 — Bjarne Riis finishes in fifth place in the 1993 Tour de France.
- 6 October — Rolf Sørensen wins the Milano–Torino road cycling race.
- Rolf Sørensen (DEN) and Jens Veggerby (DEN) win the Six Days of Copenhagen six-day track cycling race.
- Unknown date Jens Veggerby wins gold in UCI Motor-paced at the 1993 UCI Track Cycling World Championships.

=== Football ===
- 20 May – OB wins the 1992–93 Danish Cup by defeating AaB Fodbold 2–0 in the final.

=== Other ===
- 12 February — Gert Bo Jacobsen becomes WBO welterweight champions in boxing.
- 5 December — Denmark wins silver the 1993 World Women's Handball Championship in Norway after being defeated 23–22 by Germany in the final.

== Births ==
=== January–March ===
- 9 January – Nicolai Brock-Madsen, footballer
- 10 January – Jens Jønsson, footballer
- 28 February – Emmelie de Forest, singer
- 12 March – Jeppe Tverskov, footballer
- 16 March – Andreas Cornelius, footballer

=== April–June ===
- 14 April – Josephine Skriver, model
- 20 April – Viktor Bromer, swimmer
- 7 May – Isabella Arendt, Conservative politician
- 8 May – Nicolaj Thomsen, footballer
- 14 May – Nicole Broch Larsen, golfer
- 18 May – Rikke Iversen, handball player
- 27 May – Julie Brochorst Andersen, actress
- 6 June – Alba August, actress
- 21 June – Caroline Brasch Nielsen, model

=== July–September ===
- 6 July – Bassel Jradi, footballer
- 12 July – Lukas Lerager, footballer
- 13 July – Linnea Berthelsen, actress
- 22 August - Benny Jamz, rapper
- 3 September – Ida Praetorius. ballet dancer

=== October–December ===
- 5 October – Kevin Magnussen, racing driver
- 22 October – Jessica Dinnage, actress
- 8 November – Emil Nielsen, footballer
- 22 December – Hedvig Rasmussen, rower

== Deaths ==
- 6 January – Richard Mortensen, painter (born 1910)
- 26 January - Robert Jacobsen, painter and sculptor (born 1912)
- 7 April – Tonny Ahm, badminton player (born 1914)
- 30 May - Henry Heerup, painter and sculptor (born 1907)
- 15 October – Dan Turèll, writer (born 1946)
- 29 October – Aage Dons, author (born 1903)
- 30 October – Pauli Jørgensen, football player (born 1905)

== See also ==
- 1993 in Danish television
