= 1996 in Denmark =

- Decades: 1970s; 1980s; 1990s; 2000s; 2010s
- See also: Other events of 1996; List of years in Denmark

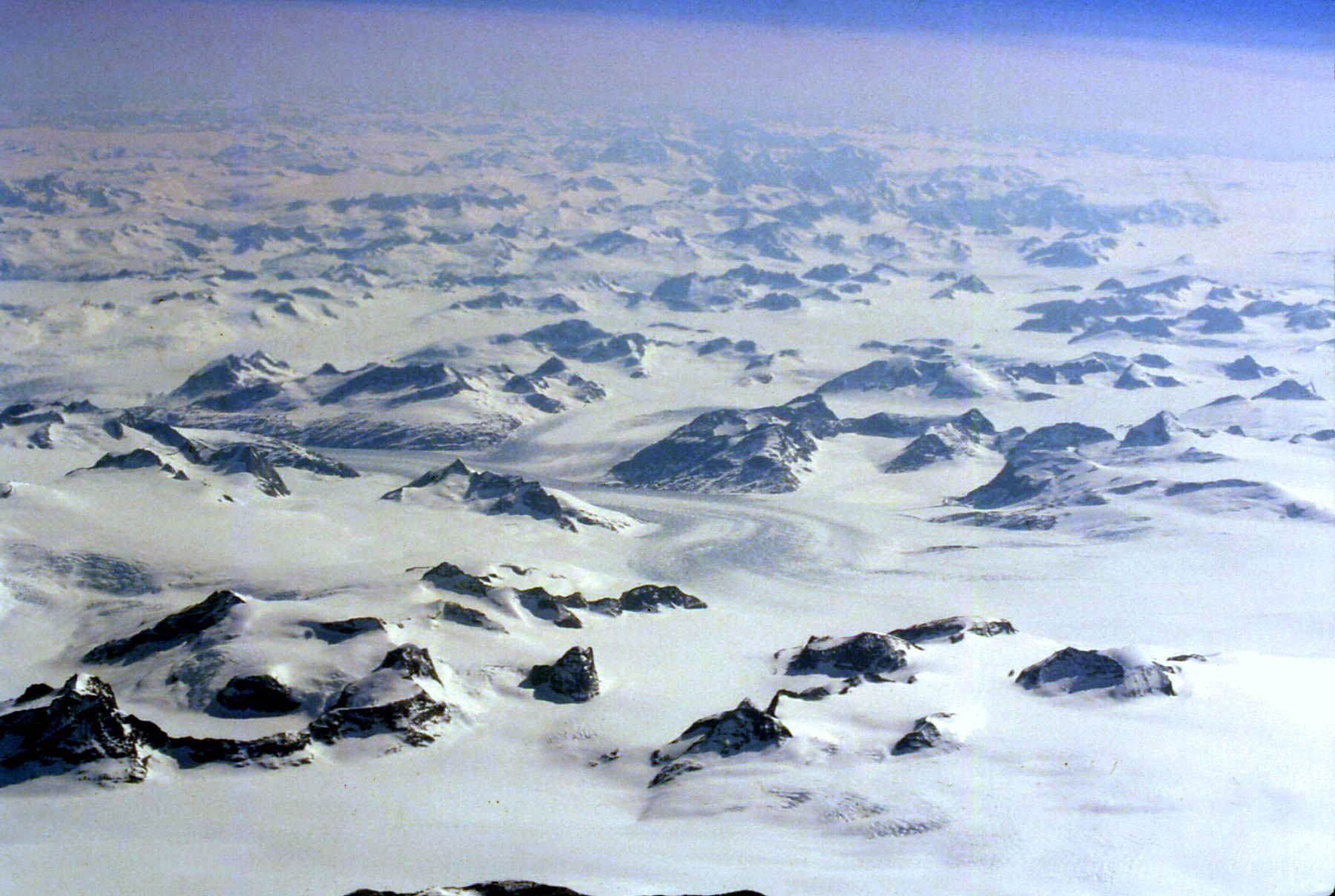

Events from the year 1996 in Denmark.

== Incumbents ==
- Monarch – Margrethe II
- Prime minister – Poul Nyrup Rasmussen

== Events ==
- 10 March – one man is killed and three others are injured by gunfire at the 1996 Copenhagen Airport shooting.
- 15 March – Arken Museum of Modern Art is inaugurated in Ishøj.
- 6 October – A rocket-propelled grenade is fired at the headquarters of the Hells Angels Motorcycle Club, killing two people and injuring nineteen others.
- 30 December – The Poul Nyrup Rasmussen III Cabinet is formed.

== The arts ==
Architecture

- Construction of Sydbank Arena is completed in Kolding.

Film and TV

- May – Lars von Trier's film Breaking the Waves wins the Grand Prix at the 49th Cannes Film Festival.
- 30 August – DR2 is launched.
- 2 December – Go' morgen Danmark begins airing on TV 2.
- The 13th Robert Awards are held, where Carsten Rudolph's 1995 film The Beast Within wins Best Danish Film and Best Screenplay.

Literature

- Bang. En roman om Herman Bang by Dorrit Willumsen about Herman Bang is published.

Music

- 9 March – The Dansk Melodi Grand Prix is held. Dorthe Andersen and Martin Loft are selected to represent Denmark in the Eurovision Song Contest with "Kun med dig".
- 18 May – "Kun med dig" places 25th at the Eurovision Song Contest and does not qualify for the finals.

== Sports ==
Olympics

- 19 July–4 August – The Danish team wins 4 gold medals, 1 silver medal and 1 bronze medal at the 1996 Summer Olympics.
- 16–25 August – The Danish team wins a total of 41 medals at the 1996 Summer Paralympics.

Football

- 1 January – AC Ballerup is founded.
- 16 May – AGF wins the 1995–96 Danish Cup by defeating Brøndby IF 2–0 in the final.
- 27 May – Brøndby IF win the 1995–96 Danish Superliga.
- 8 – 30 June – Denmark participates in the UEFA Euro 1996 in England but does not make it beyond the initial group stage after finishing third in Group D.

Badminton

- 13–20 April – The 1996 European Badminton Championships are held in Herning. The Danish team wins gold in every competition.
- 19–24 November – The 1996 IBF World Junior Championships are held in Silkeborg.
- Kastrup Magleby BK wins Europe Cup.

Cycling

- 3 March – Rolf Sørensen wins Kuurne–Brussels–Kuurne.
- 29 June – 21 July – 1996 Tour de France takes place with Bjarne Riis as the overall winner.
  - 8 July – Bjarne Riis wins the 8th stage.
  - 13 July – Rolf Sørensen wins the 13th stage.
  - 16 July – Bjarne Riis wins the 16th stage.
  - 21 July – Bjarne Riis wings the 1996 Tour de France.
- 31 July – Rolf Sørensen wins a silver medal in Men's road race at the 1996 Summer Olympics
- 31 August – Rolf Sørensen wins the 1996 Ronde van Nederland.
- Kurt Betschart (SUI) and Bruno Risi (SUI) win the Six Days of Copenhagen six-day track cycling race.

Handball

- 7 May – Randers HK is established.
- 3 August – Denmark wins gold in the Women's handball tournament at the 1996 Summer Olympics by defeating South Korea 37–33 in the final.
- 6–15 December – 1996 European Women's Handball Championship takes place in Denmark. Denmark wins gold by defeating Norway 25–23 in the final.

Other

- 11–17 March – The 1996 Copenhagen Open is held at K.B. Hallen
- 30 March–7 April – The 1996 European Amateur Boxing Championships are held in Vejle. Hasan Al for Denmark wins the Welterweight class.
- 13–14 April – The 1998 IAAF World Road Relay Championships are held in Copenhagen.
- 30 August – Hans Nielsen wins the 1986 Individual Speedway World Championship
- August – The Scandinavian Open Championship is reestablished in Klampenborg.
- 21 September – The 1996 Speedway Grand Prix of Denmark is held in Vojens.
- 22 September – Thomas Bjørn wins Loch Lomond World Invitational on the 1996 European Tour.
- 30 November–7 December – The 1996 European Curling Championships are held in Copenhagen.

== Births ==
=== January–March ===
- 4 January – Marcus Ingvartsen, footballer
- 30 January – Emma Jørgensen, canoeist
- 14 February – Nikolaj Ehlers, ice hockey player
- 27 February Rasmus Lauritsen, footballer

=== April–June ===
- 20 May – Robert Skov, footballer
- 24 May – Amalie Dideriksen, road and track cyclist
- 10 June – Oliver Abildgaard, footballer

=== July–September ===
- 4 September – Nicolai Vallys, footballer
- 25 September – Mie Nielsen, swimmer

=== October–December ===
- 1 November – Line, singer
- 2 November – Clara Rosager, actress and model
- 8 November – Jens Stage, footballer
- 10 December – Jonas Vingegaard, cyclist

== Deaths ==
- 20 January – Thorvald Hagedorn-Olsenm painter (born 1902)
- 39 March – Bjørn Stiler, cyclist (died 1911)
- 17 April – Piet Hein, scientist, mathematician, inventor, designer, author, and poet (born 1905)
- 10 May – Poul Borum, writer (born 1934)
- 26 May – Ole Berntsen, sailor (born 1915)
- 1 September – Vagn Holmboe, composer (born 1909)
- 16 September – Rolf Graae, architect (born 1916)

== See also ==
- 1996 in Danish television
