= 1905 in Denmark =

- Decades: 1880s; 1890s; 1900s; 1910s; 1920s
- See also: Other events of 1905; List of years in Denmark

Events from the year 1905 in Denmark.

== Incumbents ==
- Monarch – Christian IX
- Prime minister – Johan Henrik Deuntzer (until 14 January), J. C. Christensen

== Events ==
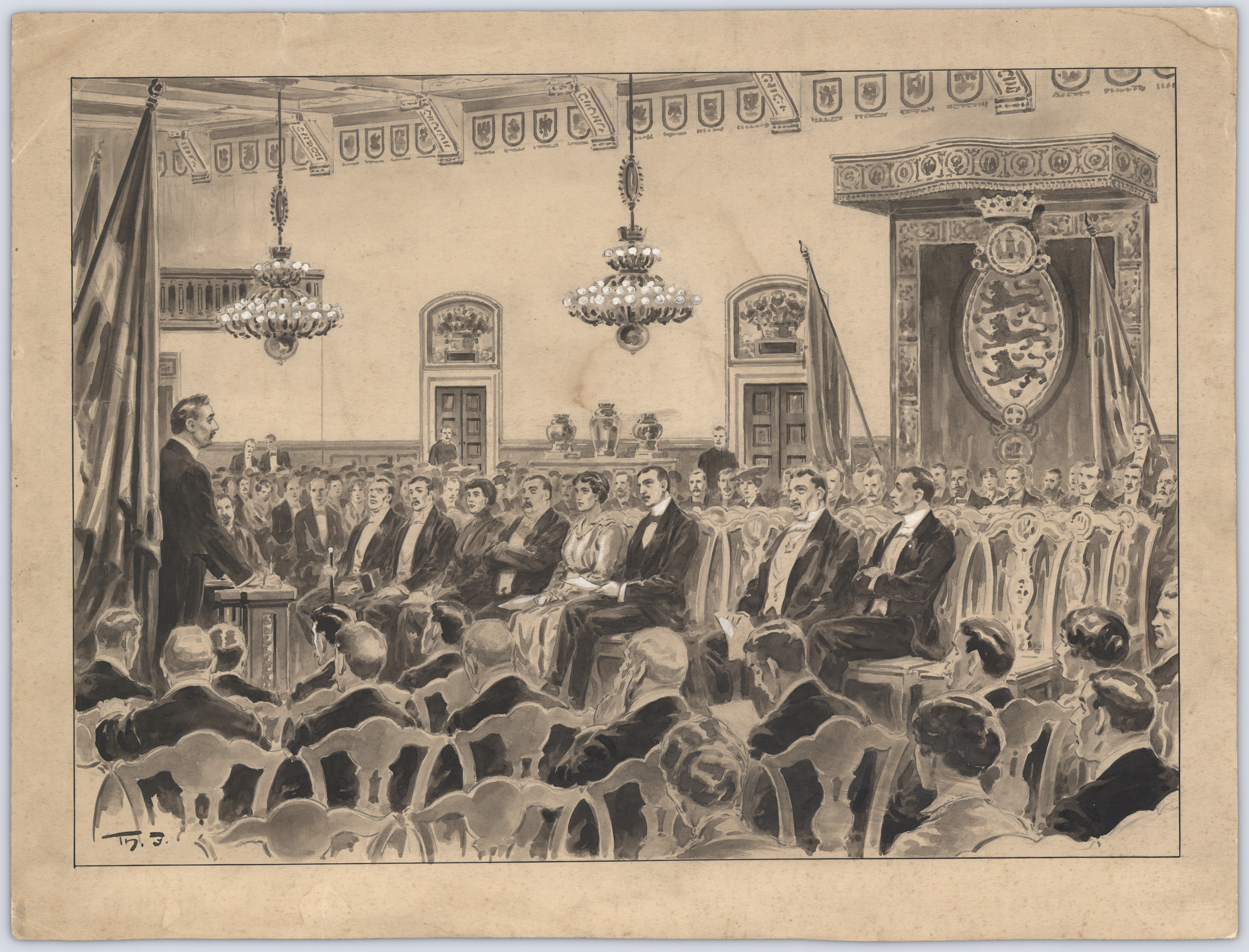
12 September: The inauguration of Copenhagen City Hall.

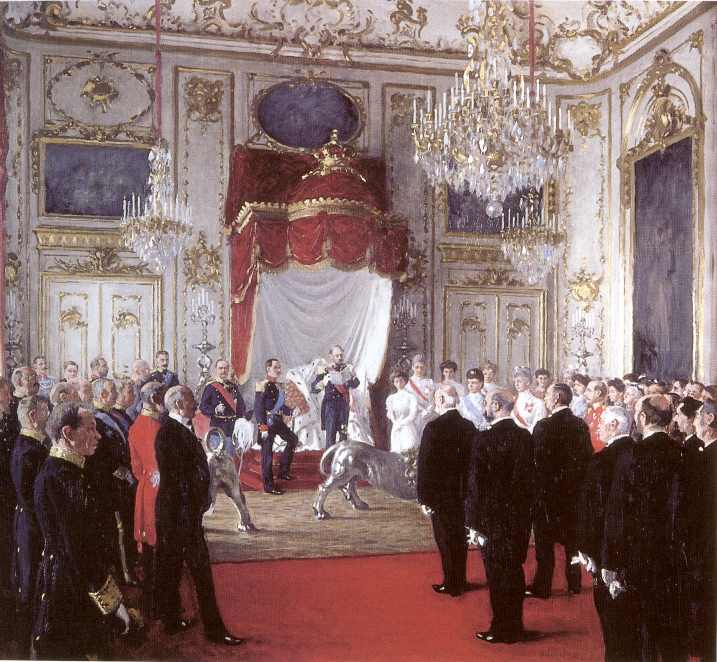
The Norwegian delegation at Amalienborg on 20 November 1905

- 1 January – Ekstra Bladet is published for the first time. Politikens Ekstrablad had been published since 12 February 1904
- 14 January – Jens Christian Christensen takes office as the new Prime Minister of Denmark.
- 27 March – The Royal Danish Academy of Music's new building on H.C. Andersens Boulevard in Copenhagen is inaugurated.
- 31 May – The watchtower in Copenhagen Zoo is inaugurated.
- 25 June – The school ship Georg Stage is in a collision with the English steamship Ancona in Hollænderdybet, resulting in Georg Stage sinking and the deaths of 22 aspiring sailors.
- 12 September – The current Copenhagen City Hall is inaugurated.
- 20 November – A delegation from the Norwegian Storting is received by Christian IX who gives his consent to the election of Prince Carl (his grandson) as King of Norway under the name Haakon VII.

== Sports ==
- 23 July – Thorvald Ellegaard wins silver in men's sprint at the 1905 UCI Track Cycling World Championships.

== Births ==
=== January–March ===
- 25 February – Harald Lander, dancer (died 1971)

=== April–June ===
- 8 April – Hans Scherfig, author and painter (died 1979)
- 2 May – Paul Høm, artist (died 1994)
- 18 June – Erik Raadal, painter (died 1941)

=== October–December ===
- 21 October – Mads Clausen, industrialist, founder of Danfoss (died 1966)
- 4 December – Pauli Jørgensen, football player (died 1993)
- 16 December – Piet Hein, scientist, mathematician, inventor, designer, author, and poet (died 1996)

== Deaths ==
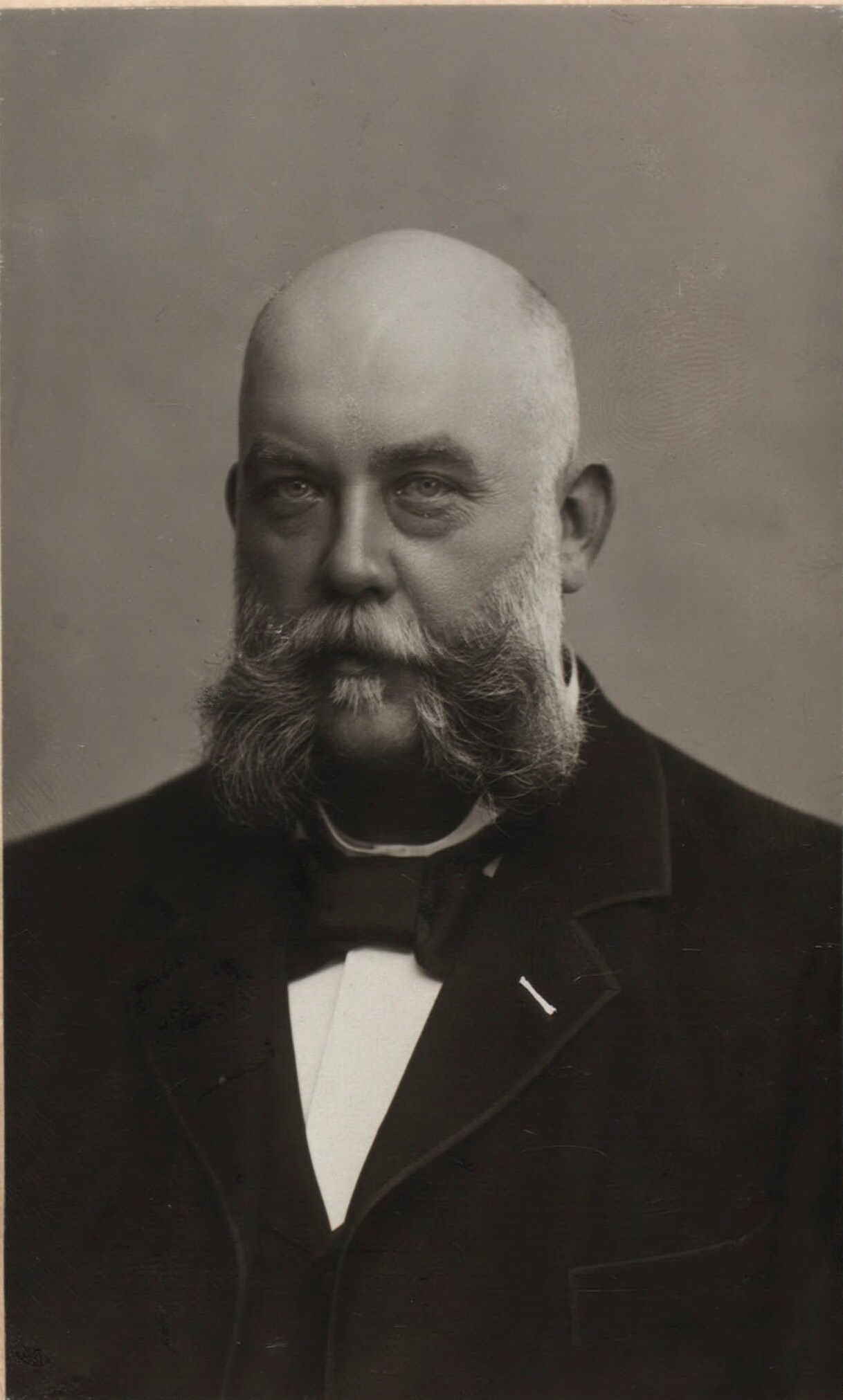
Valdemar Gætje.

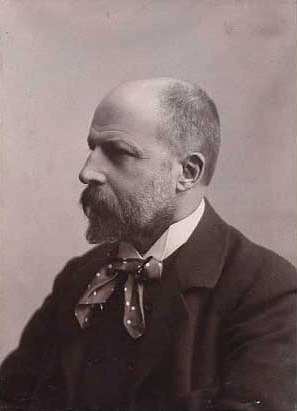
Pietro Krohn.

=== January–March ===
- 5 March – Ludvig Fenger, architect (born 1833)
- 10 March – Harald Conradsen, sculptor and medalist (born 1817)

=== April–June ===
- 11 May – Thorvald Niss, painter (born 1842)
- 13 May – Valdemar Gætje, master baker and the first director of the Union of Danish Employers and Master Craftsmen (born 1850)

=== July–September ===
- 31 July – Theodor Wessel, businessman (born 1842)
- 2 September – Knud Ejler Løgstrup, philosopher (died 1981)

=== October–December ===
- 5 October – Pietro Krohn, painter, illustrator, theatre director and museum director (born 1840)
- 4 November – Niels Christian Frederiksen, economist, businessman and politician (born 1840)
- 6 December – Viggo Stuckenberg, poet (born 1863)
