= 1836 in Denmark =

- Decades: 1810s; 1820s; 1830s; 1840s; 1850s
- See also: Other events of 1836; List of years in Denmark

Events from the year 1836 in Denmark.

== Incumbents ==
- Monarch – Frederick VI
- Prime minister – Otto Joachim

== Events ==
- 5 March – The Music Society is founded in Copenhagen, on Christoph Ernst Friedrich Weyse's birthday, and for almost a century it remains the most important music venue in Denmark
- 15 April – What will later become known as the publishing house Høst & Søn is founded when Andreas Frederik Høst (1811-1897) opened a combined book and art shop at Gothersgade 49 in Copenhagen.
- 25 June – Køge Savings Bank is established.

=== Undated ===
- Musikforeningen is founded.
- A. N. Hansen & Co. is founded.

== Culture ==
=== Performing arts ===
- Undated – Copenhagen's Music Society is founded.
- 28 November – August Bournonville's version of'La Sylphide premiers at the Royal Danish Theatre. The title role is created by Lucile Grahn.

== Births ==
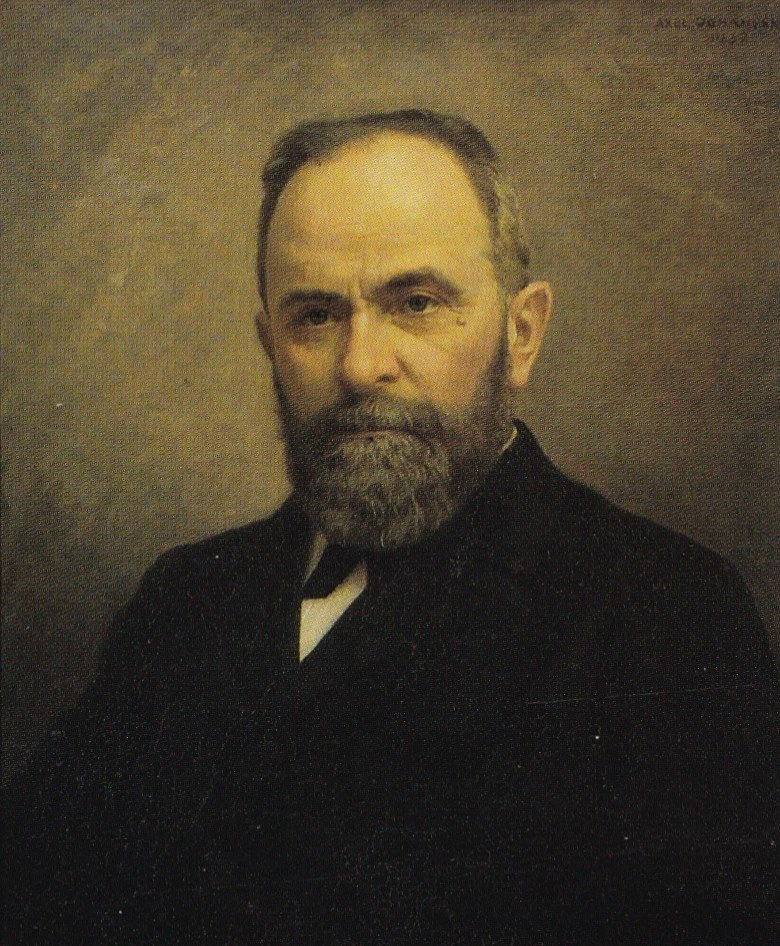
Ditlev Torm.

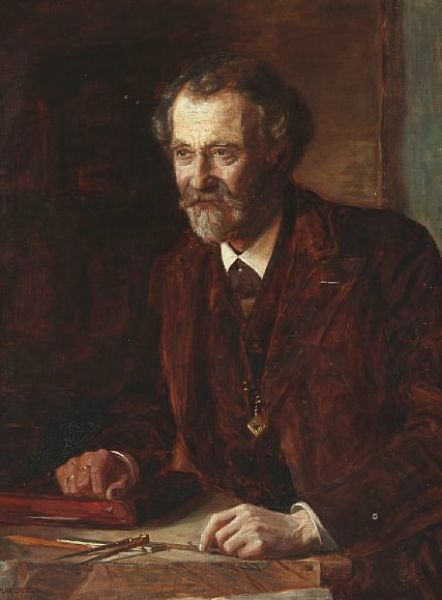
Vilhelm Dahlerup.

=== January–March ===
- 24 January – Signe Rink, writer and enothologist (died 1909)
- 1 February – Emil Hartmann, composer (died 1898)
- 2 February – Wilhelm Hellesen, industrialist and inventor (died 1892)
- 7 February – Heinrich Hirschsprung, businessman and art collector (died 1908)
- 3 March – Jean Christian Ferslew, publisher and businessman (died 1910)

=== April–June ===
- 24 April – Ditlev Torm, businessman (died 1907)
- 9 May – Sophus Schandorph, poet (died 1901)
- 12 May – Ludvig Grundtvig, photographer (died 1901)
- 3 June – Niels Hoffmeyer, army officer (died 1884)
- 4 June – Cornelia von Levetzow, writer (died 1921)

=== July–September ===
- 3 August – Emma Hørup, schoolteacher, journalist and member of the Danish Women's Society (died 1923)
- 4 August – Vilhelm Dahlerup, architect (died 1907)
- 5 August – Vilhelm Bissen, sculptor (died 1913)
- 29 August – Christian Conrad Sophus Danneskiold-Samsøe, landowner and theatre director (died 1908)
- 5 September – Johanne Fenger, composer (died 1913)
- 9 September Bernhard Olsen, museum director (died 1922)
- 22 September
  - Thomas Arboe, architect (died 1917)
  - Peter Mærsk Møller, sea captain (died 1927)
- 24 September – Christoph Cloëtta, chocolate manufacturer (died 1897)

== Deaths ==
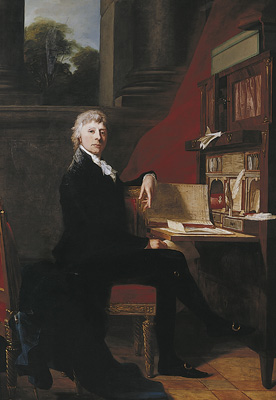
Constantin Brun.

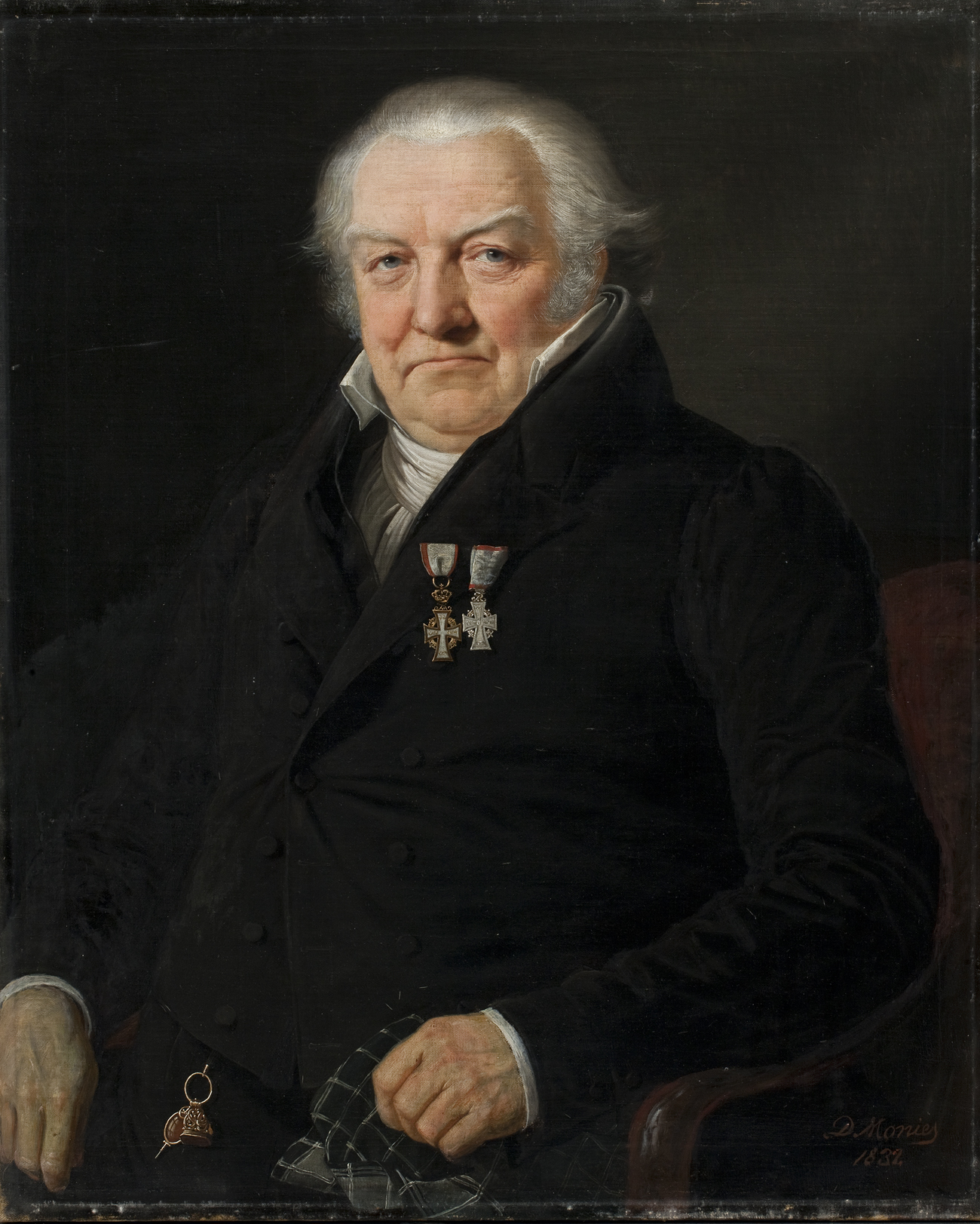
Johan Daniel Herholdt,

=== January–March ===
- 12 February – Herman Gerhard Treschow, county governor (born 1780)
- 18 February – Johan Daniel Herholdt, physician (born 1764)
- 19 February – Constantin Brun, businessman and landowner (born 1857)

=== April–June ===
- 5 May – Hans Vilhelm Cederfeld de Simonsen, landowner and government official (born 1777)

=== October–December ===
- 19 July – Johan Frederik Vilhelm Schlegel, jurist, colonial administrator (born 1765)
- 29 November – Caspar Henrik Wolfsen, privateer and customs inspector (born 1781)
- 30 December – Pierre Paul Ferdinand Mourierm Danish Asiatic Company trader and landowner (born 1746)
