= 1840 in Denmark =

- Decades: 1820s; 1830s; 1840s; 1850s; 1860s
- See also: Other events of 1840; List of years in Denmark

Events from the year 1840 in Denmark.

== Incumbents ==
- Monarch – Christian VIII
- Prime minister – Otto Joachim

== Events ==
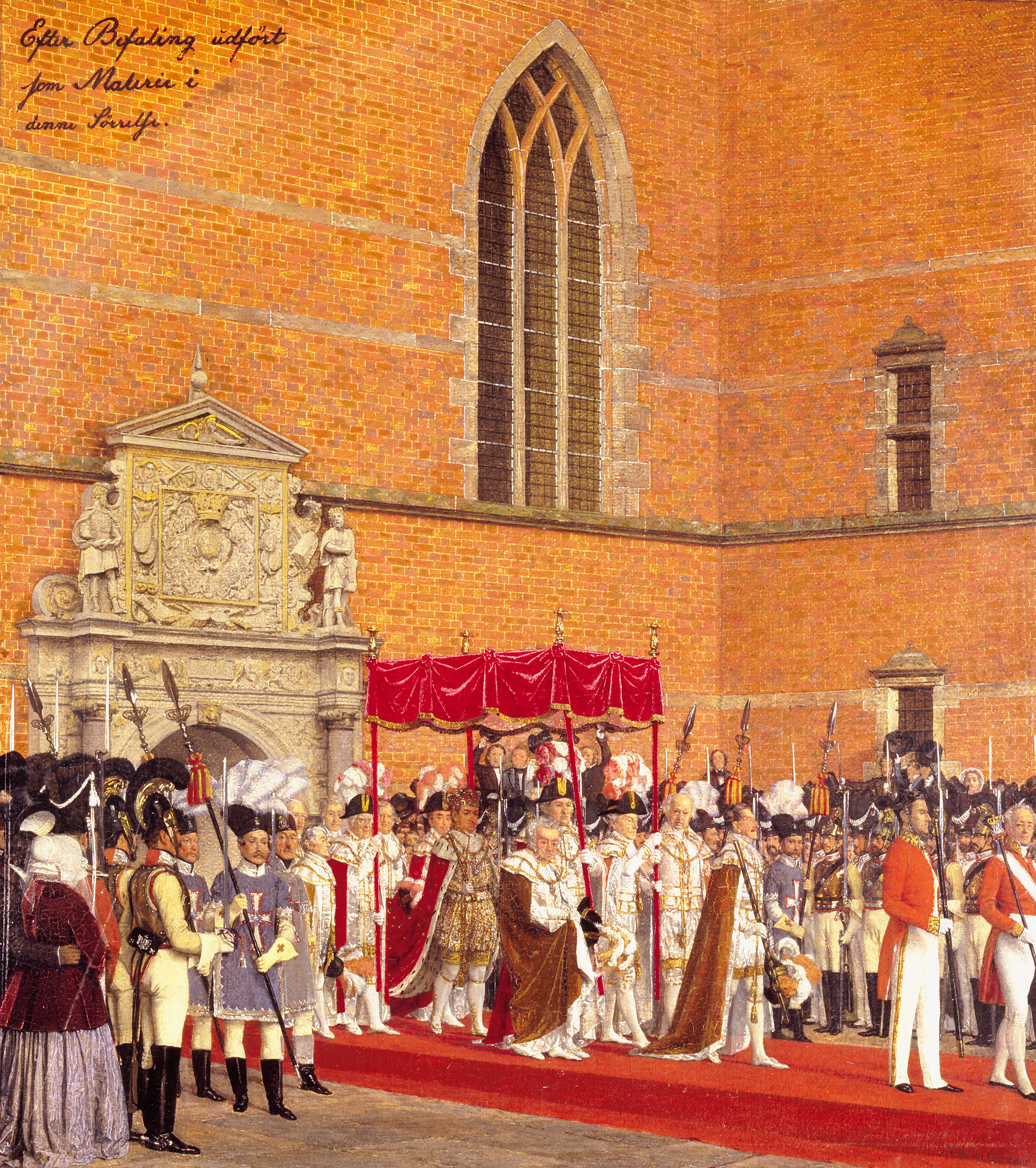
Coronation of Christian VIII of Denmark, drawing by Johan Vilhelm Gertner

=== January ===
- 1 January – An act establishes Copenhagen's municipal charter (Københavns kommunale forfatning). The 38 members of the City Council are to be elected by the citizens whereas the three mayors and the lord mayor are to be appointed by the king as was previously the case.
- 16 January – The funeral of Frederick VI of Denmark takes place at Roskilde Cathedral.

=== April ===
- 9 April – The first election for the new City Council is held. Only 1929 citizens, out of a population of about 121,000, are able to participate in the election due to heavy restrictions on voting access.

=== June ===
- 27 June – The anointing of King Christian VIII at Frederiksberg Palace, the last such ceremony to take place in Denmark before it is abolished with the introduction of the Danish constitution in 1849.

=== July ===
- 3–9 July – The 2nd Scandinavian Scientist Conference is held in Copenhagen.

=== September ===
- 8 September – Søren Kierkegaard reveals his feelings for her to Regine Olsen

=== Undated ===
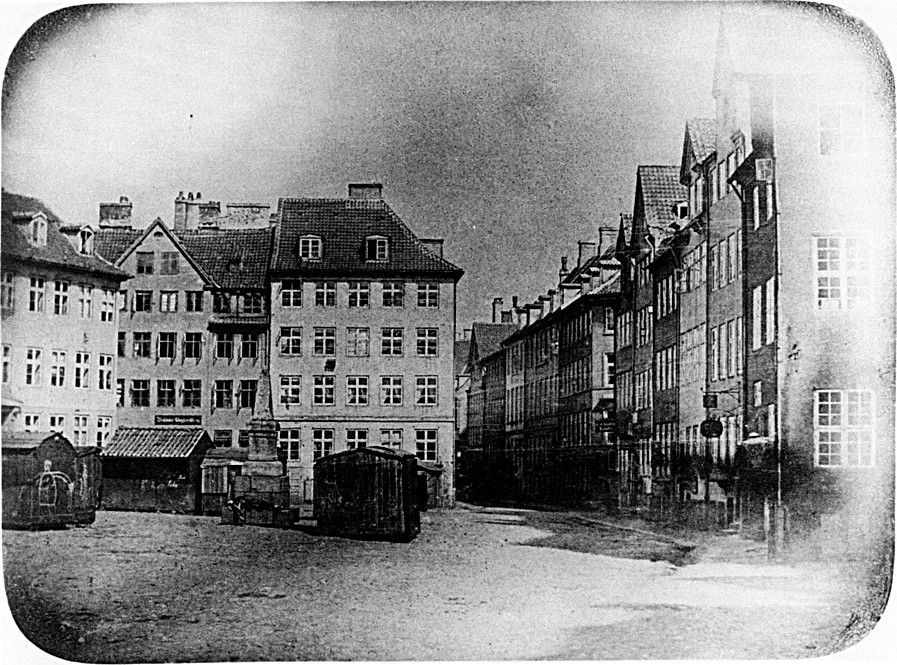
Peter Faber: Ulfeldts Plads, the oldest Danish photograph on record

- Peter Faber takes the first Danish photograph on record at Ulfeldts Plads in Copenhagen.
- Historisk Tidsskrift, a Danish history journal, is established with Christian Molbech as its first editor.
- 8 December – The magazine Corsaren is published for the first time.

== Births ==
=== January–March ===
- 4 January – Matilde Bajer, women's rights activist and pacifist (died 1934)
- 23 March – Niels Christian Frederiksen, economist, businessman and politician (died 1905)

=== April–June ===
- 1 June – Adolf Ditlev Jørgensen, historian and archivist (died 1897)
- 10 June – Theodor Philipsen, painter (died 1920)

=== July–September ===
- 5 September – Troels Frederik Lund, historian (died 1921)

=== Octobrt–December ===
- 5 October – Ursula Dahlerup, businessman and memorist (died 1925)
- 3 November – Christian Fenger. Danish-American surgeon (died 1902)
- 17 December – C. F. E. Horneman, composer (died 1906)
- 28 December – Henning Matzen, politician (died 1910)

== Deaths ==
- 27 January – Peter Ulrich Frederik Benzon, county governor and landowner (born 1760)
- 23 November – Christian Waagepetersen, wine merchant and philanthropist (born 1787)
