= 1902 in Denmark =

- Decades: 1880s; 1890s; 1900s; 1910s; 1920s
- See also: Other events of 1902; List of years in Denmark

Events from the year 1902 in Denmark.

== Incumbents ==
- Monarch – Christian IX
- Prime minister – Johan Henrik Deuntzer

== Events ==
- 16 January – The underground toilets at Amagertorv in Copenhagen opens.
- 12 May – The first telegram sent by wireless telegraphy is received in Copenhagen.
- 18 July – The public sea bath at Kalvebod Brygge in Copenhagen is inaugurated.
- 9 September – Statens Serum Institut is inaugurated.
- 19 September – A Landsting election is held with the exception that the Faroese candidate was elected on 6 August.

=== Undated ===
- First road regulations in Copenhagen are introduced: The maximum speed allowed is 11.5 km/h, 7.5 km/h in dense traffic.

== Culture ==
=== Music ===
- Carl Nielsen's opera Saul og David premieres at the Royal Danish Theatre.

== Sports ==
- 22 June – Thorvald Ellegaard wins gold in men's sprint at the 1902 UCI Track Cycling World Championships.

== Births ==
=== January–March ===
- 11 February – Arne Jacobsen, architect and designer (died 1971)
- 23 February – Flemming Lassen, architect and designer (died 1984)
- 16 March – Henry Hansen, cyclist (died 1985)

=== April–June ===
- 28 May – Thyge Petersen, boxer (died 1964)
- 1 June – Thorvald Hagedorn-Olsen, painter (died 1996)

=== July–September ===
- 6 August – Ole Ring, painter (died 1972)

=== October–December ===
- 23 October – Ib Schønberg, actor (died 1955)
- 20 November – Erik Eriksen, politician (died 1972)
- 11 December – Helga Foght, textile artist (died 1974)

== Deaths ==
- 15 February – Viggo Hørup, politician (born 1841)
- 24 February – Valdemar Koch, architect (born 1852)
- 7 March – Ida Marie Bille, court member (born 1822)
- 11 April – Johan Daniel Herholdt, architect (born 1818)
- 12 April – Herman Amberg, musician and composer (born 1834)
- 16 April — Carl Baagøe, painter (born 1829)
- 10 December – Harald Hansen, businessman (died 1835)
- 5 December – Carl Simonsen, printmaker (born 1828)
