= 1911 in Denmark =

- Decades: 1890s; 1900s; 1910s; 1920s; 1930s
- See also: Other events of 1911; List of years in Denmark

Events from the year 1911 in Denmark.

== Incumbents ==
- Monarch – Frederick VIII
- Prime minister – Klaus Berntsen

== Events ==
- 14 April – The Danish Musicians' Union is established.
- 21 April – The Danish Society for Nature Conservation is founded.
- 13 May – The Directorate of State Forestry is established.
- 8 October – The Services Union is established.
- 1 December – The new Copenhagen Central Station opens.

=== Undated ===
- The Royal Danish Navy begins building its fleet of Havmanden-class submarines.

== Books ==
- Morten Korch – Sin egen sti

== Sports ==
=== Cycling ===
- Date unknown – Thorvald Ellegaard wins gold in men's sprint at the 1911 UCI Track Cycling World Championships.

=== Football ===
- 1911 Copenhagen Football Championship
- 25 May – The main stadium of Københavns Idrætspark, the first fully enclosed ground in Denmark, opened on the 25 May 1911, with a capacity of 12000, with a football match between a Copenhagen XI and The Wednesday of England.

== Culture ==
=== Film ===
- A Victim of the Mormons, directed by August Blom

== Births ==
=== January–March ===
- 5 January – Bjørn Hjelmborg, composer and organist (died 1994)
- 14 January – Clara Østø, actress (died 1983)
- 27 January – Lilian Weber Hansen, actress (died 1987)
- 10 February – Einar Tang-Holbek, archer (died 2000)
- 20 February – Peter Glob, archaeologist (died 1985)

=== April–June ===
- 31 May – Else Jacobsen, swimmer (died 1965)
- 15 June – Grete Frische, actress, screenwriter and director (died 1962)
- 24 June – Helga Pedersen, politician (died 1980)

=== July–December ===
- 3 July – Jonas Bruun, lawyer (died 1977)
- 17 July – Anker Jacobsen, tennis player (died 1975)
- 20 July – Flemming Helweg-Larsen, Nazi Germany collaborator and murderer (died 1946)
- 24 July – Bjørn Stiler, cyclist (died 1996)
- 8 August – Else Jarlbak, actress (died 1963)
- 27 September – Poul Cadovius, furniture manufacturer and designer (died 2011)
- 31 October – Richard Olsen, rower (died 1956)
- 30 December – Hans Ussing, zoologist (died 2000)

== Deaths ==
=== January–March ===
- 2 January – Elfride Fibiger, writer (born 1832)
- 7 January – Kaspar Rostrup, businessman (birn 1845)
- 3 February – Christian Bohr, physician (born 1855)
- 18 February – Emil Vett, businessman (born 1843)

=== April–June ===
- 18 April – Poul Sveistrup, politician and social statician (born 1848)
- 8 June – Emil Poulsen, actor and director (born 1842)
- 14 June – Johan Svendsen, composer and conductor (born 1840 in Norway)
- 26 June – Vilhelm Bergsøem author and zoologist (born 1835)

=== July–September ===
- 23 July – Niels Viggo Ussing, mineralogist (born 1864)
- 25 July – Anna Laursen, educator and activist (born 1845)
- 7 August – Peder Madsen, theologian and bishop (born 1843)
- 12 September – Niels Andersen, businessman (born 1835)
- 19 September – Gustav Budde-Lund, zoologist (born 1846)

=== October–December ===
- 1 November – Sonja Ferlov Mancobam sculptor (died 1987 in France)
- 2 December – Regitze Barner, writer and philanthropist (born 1834)
- 5 December – Edvard Petersen, painter (born 1841)
- 26 December – Christopher Peter Jürgensen, mechanician and instrument maker (born 1838)
