= 1995 in Denmark =

- Decades: 1970s; 1980s; 1990s; 2000s; 2010s
- See also: Other events of 1995; List of years in Denmark

The following events occurred in Denmark in the year 1995.

== Incumbents ==
- Monarch – Margrethe II
- Prime minister – Poul Nyrup Rasmussen

== Events ==
=== Undated ===
- Thulegate, a political scandal regarding the government's tacit approval of the storage of nuclear weapons in Greenland in contravention of Denmark's nuclear free zone.

== The arts ==
- 22 March – The Dogma 95 movement is launched at Le cinéma vers son deuxième siècle conference in Paris, where the cinema world gathered to celebrate the first century of motion pictures and contemplate the uncertain future of commercial cinema.

== Sports ==
=== Badminton ===
- Lillerød BK wins the Europe Cup.
- 14—18 March – Poul-Erik Høyer Larsen wins gold in men's singles and Thomas Lund and Marlene Thomsen wins gold in mixed doubles at the 1995 All England Open Badminton Championships.
- 22–28 May – Denmark wins one gold medal, one silver medal and two bronze medals at the 1995 IBF World Championships.

=== Cycling ===
- 5 April – Lars Michaelsen wins the Gent–Wevelgem road cycling race in Belgium.
- 23 July – Bjarne Riis finishes 3rd in the 1995 Tour de France.
- 18 October – Rolf Sørensen finishes second in the Milano–Torino road cycling race.
- Danny Clark (AUS) and Jimmi Madsen (DEN) win the Six Days of Copenhagen six-day track cycling race.

=== Football ===
- 25 May – F.C. Copenhagen wins the 1994–95 Danish Cup by defeating AB 5–0 in the final.
- 6 September – Denmark qualifies for UEFA Euro 1996 by defeating Armenia 3–1 in their last match in Group 2 of the UEFA Euro 1996 qualifying.

=== Swimming ===
- 22 August – Denmark wins two gold medals, two silver medals and two bronze medals at the 1995 European Aquatics Championships.

=== Other ===
- 7 August – Wilson Kipketer wins gold in Men's 800 metres at the 1995 World Championships in Athletics.
- 21 August – Erik Gundersen wins the 1985 Individual Speedway World Championship in Bradford, England.
- 17 December – Denmark wins bronze at the 1995 World Women's Handball Championship in Hungary after defeating Norway 25–24 in the bronze match.

== Births ==
=== January–March ===
- 11 January – Jakob Blåbjerg, footballer
- 15 January – Andrew Hjulsager, footballer
- 29 January – Carlo de Reuver, footballer
- 4 February – Pione Sisto, footballer
- 27 February – Marcus Solberg, footballer
- 3 March – Matthias Asperup, ice hockey player
- 9 March – Emiliano Hansen, footballer

=== April–June ===
- 10 April – Oliver Bjorkstrand, ice hockey player
- 30 April – Jeppe Højbjerg, footballer
- 31 May – Anita Madsen, figure skater
- 4 June – Mikkel Wohlgemuth, footballer
- 6 June – Lasse Haugaard Pedersen, politician

=== July–December ===
- 6 July – Noah Skaalum, singer
- 12 July – Lukas Lerager, Danish footballer
- 4 August – Jacob Dehn Andersen, footballer
- 5 August – Pierre-Emile Højbjerg, footballer
- 18 December – Mads Pedersen, racing cyclist

== Deaths ==
=== January–March ===
- 12 February – Astrid Villaume, actress (born 1923)
- 21 February
  - Bjarne Henning-Jensen, film director and screenwriter (born 1908)
  - Morian Hansen, motorcycle speedway rider (born 1905)
- 28 March – Mogens Ellegaard, accordion player (born 1935)

=== April–June ===
- 9 May – Jeanne Darville, actor (born 1923)
- 28 May – Henning Kronstam, ballet dancer, master, and theatre director (born 1934)
- 15 June – Preben Lerdorff Rye, actor (born 1917)

=== July–September ===
- 2 July – Dan Sterup-Hansen, artist (born 1918)
- 13 July – Godtfred Kirk Christiansen, businessman (born 1920)
- 13 July – Godtfred Kirk Christiansen, managing director of The Lego Group (born 1920)
- 2 August – Eva Gredal, politician (born 1927)
- 21 August – Guri Richter, actor (born 1917)
- 19 September – Avi Sagild, actor (born 1933 in USA)
- 27 September – Hermann Zobel, equestrian (born 1908)

=== October–December ===
- 4 October – Else Brems, opera singer (born 1908)
- 26 October – Wilhelm Freddie, artist and filmmaker (born 1909)
- 15 November – Karen Berg, actor (born 1906)
- 12 December – Princess Caroline-Mathilde of Denmark, hereditary princess of Denmark (born 1912)
- 13 December – Gerda Bengtsson, textile artist (born 1900)

== See also ==
- 1995 in Danish television
