= 1906 in Denmark =

- Decades: 1880s; 1890s; 1900s; 1910s; 1920s
- See also: Other events of 1906; List of years in Denmark

Events from the year 1906 in Denmark.

== Incumbents ==
- Monarch – Christian IX (until 29 January), Frederick VIII
- Prime minister – J. C. Christensen

== Events ==
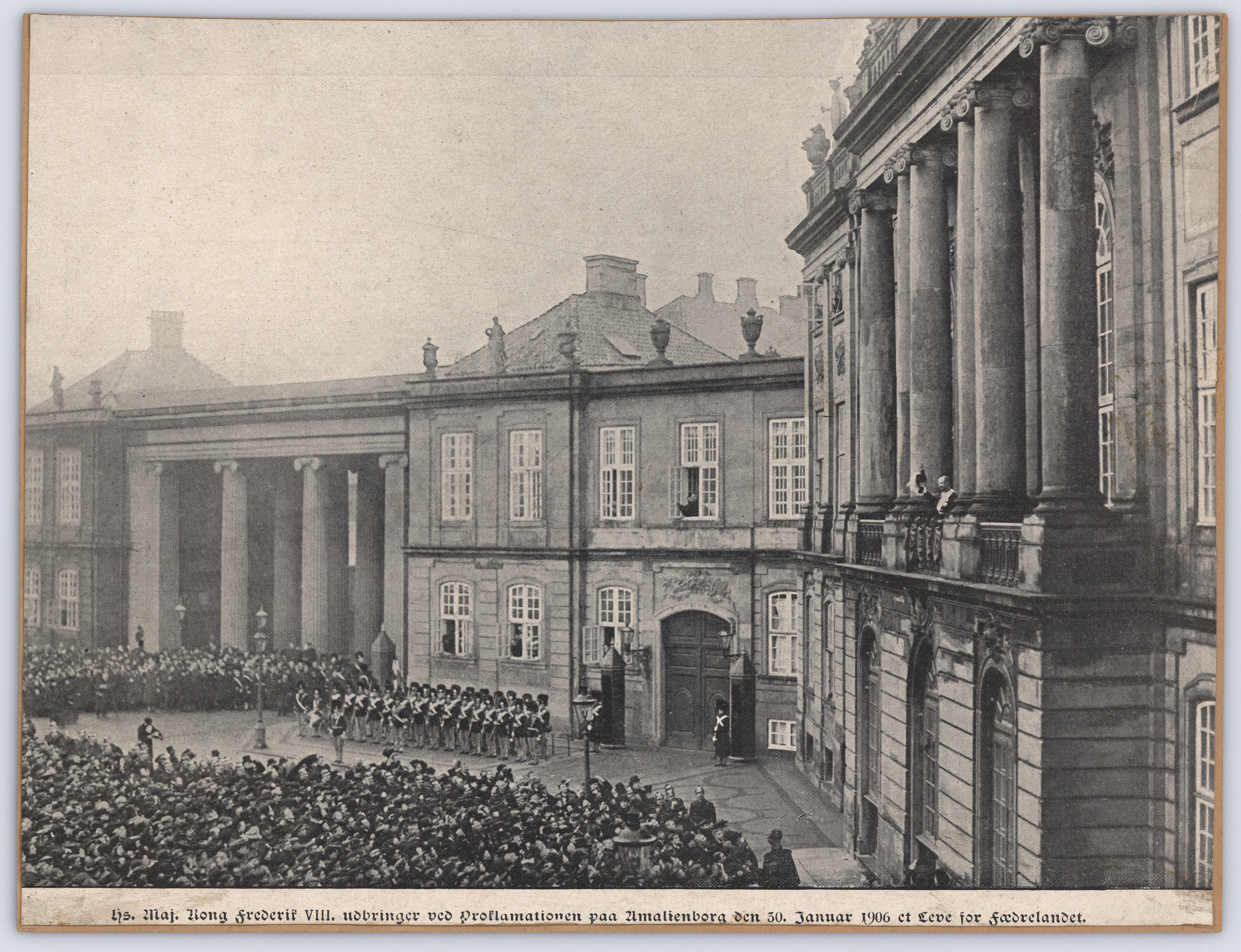
30 January: The proclamation of Frederick VIII as King of Denmark.

- 30 January – The proclamation of Frederick VIII as King of Denmark.
- 12 September – The inventor and aviation pioneer Jacob Christian Ellehammer makes a sustained but tethered flight in his self-built Ellehammer semi-biplane on the small island of Lindholm outside Copenhagen, three years after the world’s first historical flight by the Wright brothers in 1903. The flight distance is 42 meters at an altitude of over 50 centimeters.
- 6 November – Ole Olsen founds Nordisk Film in Valby, Copenhagen, making it the oldest continuously operating film studio in the world.

== Culture ==
=== Music ===
- 11 November – Carl Nielsen's opera Maskarade premieres at the Royal Danish Theatre.

== Sports ==
- 5 August – Thorvald Ellegaard wins gold in men's sprint at the 1906 UCI Track Cycling World Championships.

== Births ==
- 22 February – Helge Kjærulff-Schmidt, actor (died 1982)
- 27 February – Søren Kristian Toubro, engineer and Larsen & Toubro co-founder (died 1982)
- 9 March – Bernhard Christensen, musician (died 2004)
- 1 September – Aksel Schiøtz, singer (died 1975)
- 2 October – Arne Sørensen, politician (died 1978)
- 10 October – Leo Mathisen, jazz musician and singer (died 1969)
- 8 November – H. C. Hansen, politician, former prime minister (died 1960)
- 21 December – Frode Jakobsen, politician (died 1997)

=== Full date unknown ===
- Aage Thaarup, fashion designer (died 1987)

== Deaths ==
=== January–March ===
- 29 January – Christian IX (born 1818)
- 13 February – Albert Gottschalk, painter (born 1866)
- 7 March – Oscar Wanscher, surgeon (born 1846)

=== April–June ===
- 12 April – Søren Anton van der Aa Kühle, brewer and businessman (born 1849)
- 5 May– Andreas Riis Carstensen, painter (born 1844)
- 8 June – C. F. E. Horneman, composer (born 1840)

=== July–September ===
- 28 July – August Jerndorff, painter (born 1846)

=== October–December ===
- 13 October – Sigfred Goldschmidt, businessman (born 1831)
- 29 October – Jacob Heinrich Moresco, businessman (born 1828)
