= 1910 in Denmark =

- Decades: 1890s; 1900s; 1910s; 1920s; 1930s
- See also: Other events of 1910; List of years in Denmark

Events from the year 1910 in Denmark.

== Incumbents ==
- Monarch – Frederick VIII
- Prime minister – Carl Theodor Zahle (until 5 July), Klaus Berntsen

== Events ==
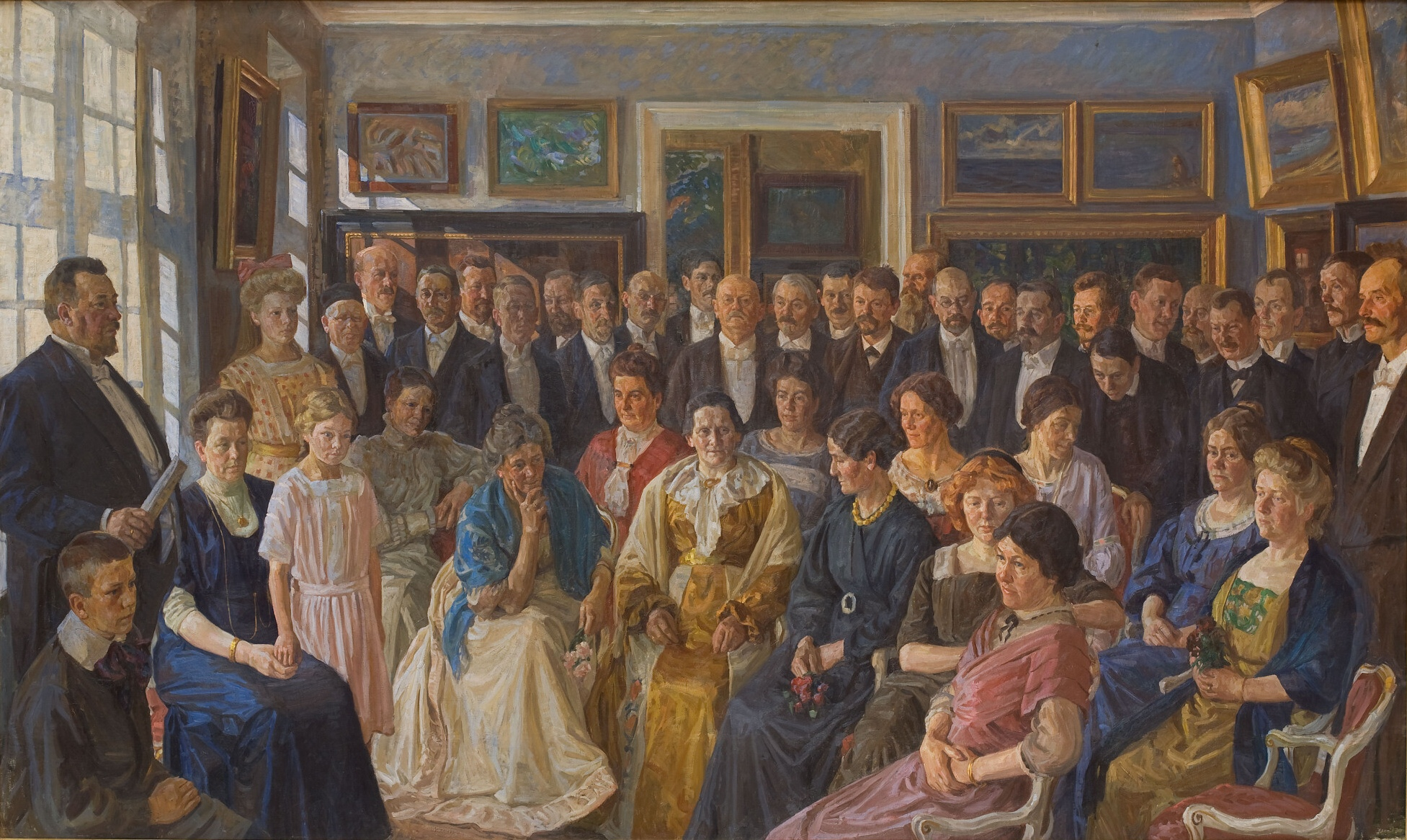
From the inauguration of Faaborg Museum on 24 June, painting by Peter Hansen

January

- 5 January – Robert Svendsen set a Danish record when he reached a height of 84 during a flight at Kløvermarken in Amager.

May

- 20 May – The 1910 Folketing election is held.

June

- 3 June – Politiken-journalist Alfred Nervø makes the first flight over downtown Copenhagen when he takes off from Kløvermarken in a Voisin biplane, crosses the harbour and flies over Copenhagen Fortress and The Lakes before making a circuit of the City Hall tower and returns to Kløvermarken where he lands safely.
- 24 June – Faaborg Museum is inaugurated in manufacturer Mads Rasmussen's apartment. The current building was built from 1912 to 1915.

September

- 20 September – The 1910 Landsting election is held.

=== Date unknown ===
- The first separate bicycle path in Copenhagen is established around The Lakes, when the existing bridle paths are converted into isolated cycleways to accommodate the heavy growth of cycles at that time.
- There are almost 50,000 flush toilets installed in Copenhagen.

== Sports ==
- 10 June – Fremad Amager is founded.
- 25 July – Thorvald Ellegaard wins silver in men's sprint at the 1910 UCI Track Cycling World Championships.

== Births ==
=== January–March ===
- 30 January – Victor Gram, politician (died 1969)
- 6 March – Ejler Bille, artist (died 2004)
- 13 March – Karl Gustav Ahlefeldt, actor (died 1985)

=== April–June ===
- 10 April – Aage Leidersdorff, Olympic fencer (died 1970)
- 10 May – Ebbe Rode, actor (died 1998)
- 26 June – Lau Lauritzen Jr., actor (died 1977)

=== July–September ===
- 21 July – Viggo Kampmann, politician, former prime minister (died 1976)
- 23 September – Acton Bjørn, architect and designer (died 1992)

=== October–December ===
- 23 October – Richard Mortensen, painter (died 1993)
- 1 December
  - Ada Bruhn Hoffmeyer, medieval weapons expert (died 1991)
  - Per Palle Storm, sculptor (died 1994)

== Deaths ==
=== January–March ===
- 10 January – Frederik Vermehren, painter (born 1823)

=== April–June ===
- 26 April – Christian Vilhelm Nielsen, architect (born 1833)
- 10 May – Palle Bruun, hydraulic engineer, designed the Port of Skagen (born 1873)
- 20 May – Vilhelm Prior, book dealer and publisher (born 1835)

=== July–September ===
- 6 July – Jean Christian Ferslew, publisher and businessman (born 1836)
- 18 July – Henning Matzen, politician (born 1840)
- 26 September – Thorvald N. Thiele, astronomer (born 1838)

=== October–December ===
- 4 November – Louise Bille-Brahe, court member (born 1830)
- 15 November – Julius Exner, painter (born 1825)
