= 1842 in Denmark =

- Decades: 1820s; 1830s; 1840s; 1850s; 1860s
- See also: Other events of 1842; List of years in Denmark

Events from the year 1842 in Denmark.

== Incumbents ==
- Monarch – Christian VIII
- Prime minister – Otto Joachim, Poul Christian Stemann

== Events ==
- 20 January – Orla Lehmann is convicted of having criticized the absolute monarchy in his radical Falster Speech (delivered in 1834). Hof- og Stadsretten had only sentenced him to a fine of DKK 500.
- 23 July – Hørsholm Textile Factory is established in Hørsholm.

Undated

- The National Liberal Party is formed.
- Jørgen Ernst Meyer establishes the nation's first lacquerware company.

== Culture ==
=== Performing arts ===
- 29 March – August Bournonville's ballet Napoli receives its world premiere at the Royal Danish Theatre.

== Births ==
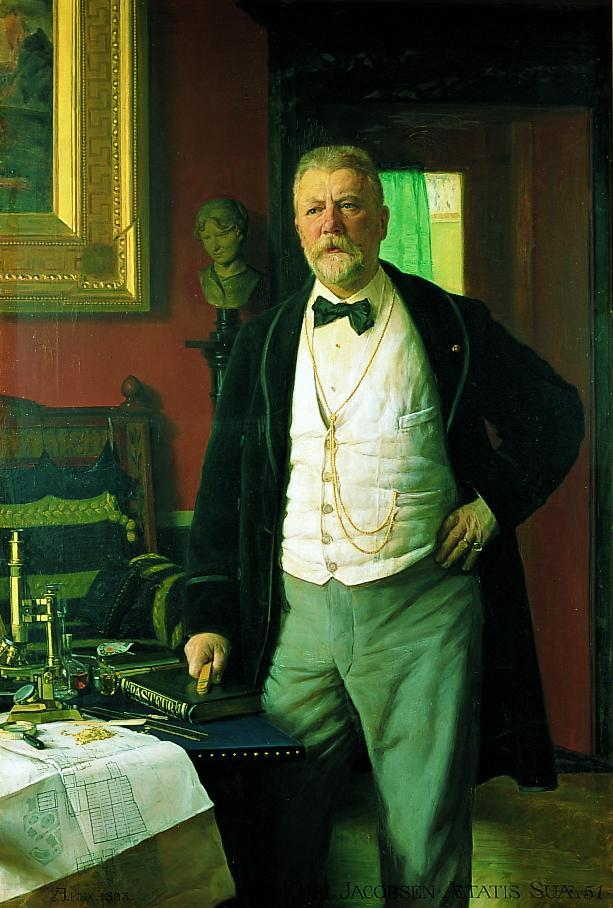
Carl Jacobsen.

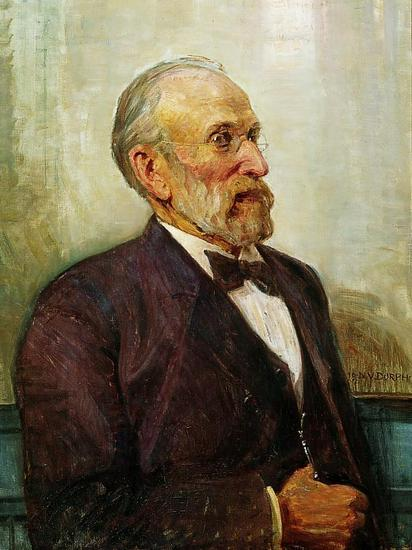
Gustav Adolph Hagemann.

=== January–March ===
- 25 January – Vilhelm Thomsen, linguist (died 1927)
- 4 February – Georg Brandes, critic and scholar (died 1927)
- 27 February – Theodor Wessel, businessman (died 1905)
- 2 March – Carl Jacobsen, brewer, industrialist and arts patron (died 1914)
- 9 March – Vilhelm Groth, painter (died 1899)

=== April–June ===
- 3 April – Niels Peter Bornholdt, businessman (died 1924)
- 6 May – Emil Christian Hansen, chemist (died 1909)
- 16 May – Gustav Adolph Hagemann, engineer and businessman (died 1916)

=== July–September ===
- 9 July – Emil Poulsen, actor (died 1911)
- 17 August – Hugo Egmont Hørring, politician, prime minister of Denmark (died 1909)
- 22 August – Emilie Mundt, painter (died 1922)

=== October–December ===
- 9 October – Louise Nimb, restaurateur (died 1903)
- 4 November – Otto Haslund, painter (died 1917)
- 16 November – Hannibal Sehested, prime minister of Denmark (died 1924)

== Deaths ==
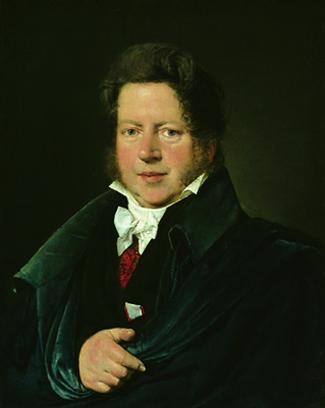
Peter Oluf Brøndsted.

- 18 January – Ludvig Manthey, pharmacist, businessman and landowner (died 1769)
- 2 February – Peter Frederik Wulff, naval officer (born 1774 )
- 6 June – Eline Heger, actress (born 1774)
- 26 June – Peter Oluf Brøndsted, archaeologist (born 1780)
- 9 July – Emil Poulsen, actor and director (died 1911)
- 8 October – Christoph Ernst Friedrich Weyse, composer (born 1774)
- 12 October – Haagen Mathiesenm businessman (born 1759 in Norway)
