= 1780 in Denmark =

- Decades: 1760s; 1770s; 1780s; 1790s; 1800s
- See also: Other events of 1780; List of years in Denmark

Events from the year 1780 in Denmark.

== Incumbents ==
- Monarch – Christian VII
- Prime minister – Ove Høegh-Guldberg

== Events ==
- August - Denmark–Norway joins the First League of Armed Neutrality.

== Births ==
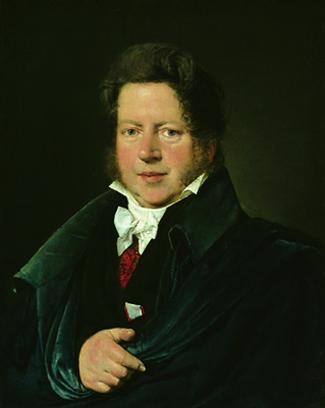
Peter Oluf Brøndsted.

- 17 July – Herman Gerhard Treschow, county governor (died 1836)
- 3 September – Heinrich Christian Schumacher, astronomer (died 1850)
- 16 November – Peter Oluf Brøndsted, archaeologist (died 1842)

== Deaths ==
- 18 July – Gerhard Schøning, archivist (born 1722 in Norway)
- 4 September – Christian Leberecht von Prøck, Governor-General of the Danish West Indies (born 1718)
