= 1904 in Denmark =

- Decades: 1880s; 1890s; 1900s; 1910s; 1920s
- See also: Other events of 1904; List of years in Denmark

Events from the year 1904 in Denmark.

== Incumbents ==
- Monarch – Christian IX
- Prime minister – Johan Henrik Deuntzer

== Events ==
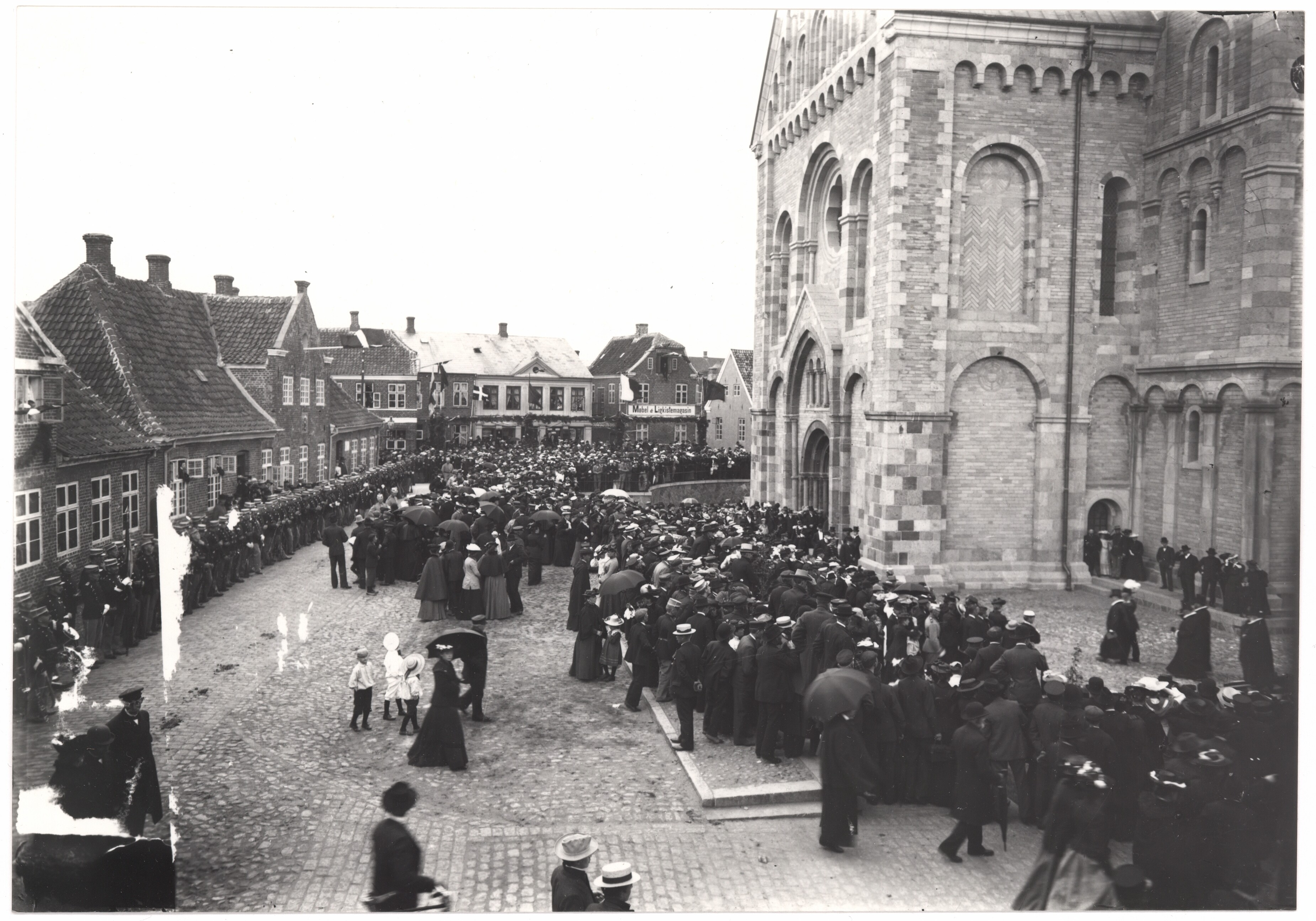
7 August: The reinauguration of Ribe Cathedral.

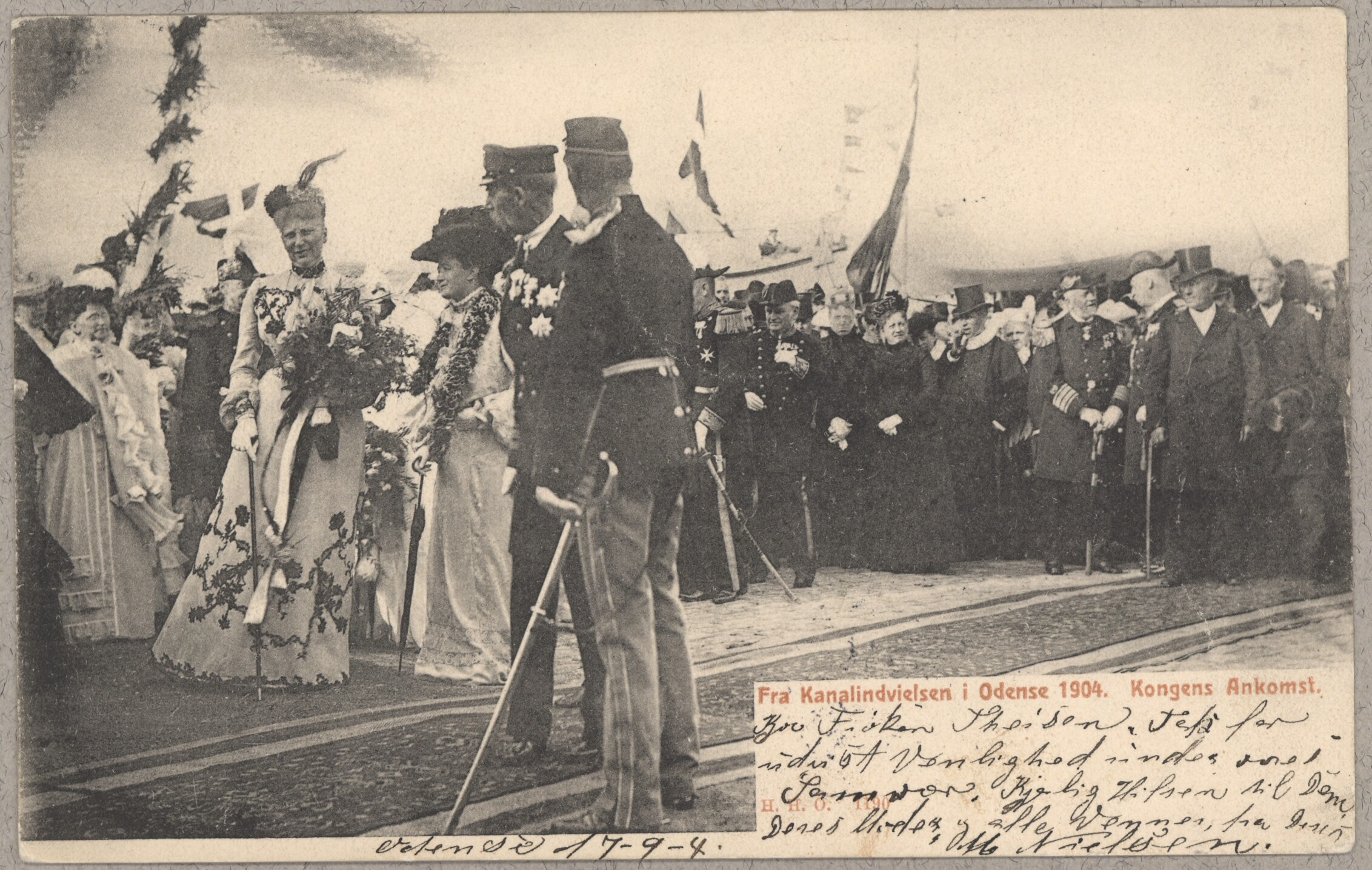
27 August: The inauguration of Odense Canal.

=== February ===
- 12 February – Politikens Ekstrablad is published for the first time.

=== June ===
- 22 June – The trans-Atlantic passenger liner SS Norge departs from Copenhagen, embarking on what will become her last voyage. On 28 June, she wrecks off the American coast, resulting in more than 630 casualties.

=== August ===
- 7 August – The reinauguration of Ribe Cathedral.
- 27 August – The inauguration of Odense Canal in Odense is attended by the king.

=== September ===
- 17 September – The first Danish cinema, Kosmorama at Østerbrogade in Copenhagen, opens.

=== December ===
- 4 December – The K.U. or Konservativ Ungdom (Young Conservatives) is founded by Carl F. Herman von Rosen.

=== Undated ===
- April – The fingerprint technique is adopted by the Copenhagen Police Force.
- The electrified tramway is extended from Tuborg to Klampenborg.
- The first vacuum cleaners arrive in the country.

== Sports ==
- 21 August – Fremad Valby is founded.
- 10 September – Thorvald Ellegaard wins silver in men's sprint at the 1904 UCI Track Cycling World Championships.

== Births ==
- 26 March – Leck Fischer, writer and playwright (died 1956)
- 5 May – Frederik Marcus Knuth (taxonomist) and count of Knuthenborg (died 1970)
- 25 June – Poul Sørensen, politician (died 1969)

== Deaths ==
- 18 March – Carl Johan Frydensberg, composer (born 1835)
- 24 September – Niels Ryberg Finsen (born 1860, in the Faroe Islands)
- 6 December – Johan Bartholdy, composer (born 1853)
- 7 December – C. M. T. Cold, naval officer and born (died 1863)
