= 1993 in Danish television =

This article summarizes notable events in Danish television in 1993, including programme debuts, finales, and developments involving broadcasters and television personalities.

== Channels ==
Launches:

- Unknown: dk4
- Unknown: K-T.V.
- 1 January: Euronews
- 17 September: Turner Classic Movies

== See also ==
- 1993 in Denmark
