= 1997 in Denmark =

- Decades: 1970s; 1980s; 1990s; 2000s; 2010s
- See also: Other events of 1997; List of years in Denmark

Events from the year 1997 in Denmark.

== Incumbents ==
- Monarch - Margrethe II
- Prime minister - Poul Nyrup Rasmussen

== Events ==
- 13 July–23 July – The 1997 Summer Deaflympics are held in Copenhagen.

== Sports ==
Badminton

- 24 May – 1 June – Denmark wins one gold medal, one silver medal and two bronze medals at the 1997 IBF World Championships.
- Hvidovre BK wins the Europe Cup.

Cycling

- 6 April – Rolf Sørensen wins the Tour of Flanders classic road cycling race.
- 26 April – Bjarne Riis wins the 1997 Amstel Gold Race.
- 27 July – Bjarne Riis finishes as number 7 in the 1997 Tour de France.
- October – Rolf Sørensen finishes second in the Züri-Metzgete road cycling race.
- Jimmi Madsen (DEN) and Jens Veggerby (DEN) win the Six Days of Copenhagen six-day track cycling race.

Football

- 7 May – F.C. Copenhagen wins the 1996–97 Danish Cup by defeating Ikast FC 2–0 in the final.

Handball

- 14 December – Denmark wins gold at the 1997 World Women's Handball Championship in Germany by defeating Norway 33–20 in the final.

Swimming

- 18–24 – 1997 European Aquatics Championships
  - 19 August – Denmark wins a bronze medal in Women's 4 × 200 metre freestyle relay.
  - 22 August Mette Jacobsen wins a gold medal in Women's 100 metre butterfly
  - 24 August Mette Jacobsen wins a bronze medal in Women's 200 metre butterfly.

Other

- 8 March – Wilson Kipketer wins gold in Men's 800 metres at the 1997 IAAF World Indoor Championships in Paris, France.
- May – Mads Larsen becomes IBO super middleweight Champion after a fourth-round knockout win over American Shannon Landberg.
- 15 June – Tom Kristensen wins Le Mans for the first time as part of the Joest Racing team.
- August – Wilson Kipketer wins gold in Men's 800 metres at the 1997 World Championships in Athletics in Athens, Greece.
- 24 August – Wilson Kipketer sets his third world record in the men's 800 metres that year with the time 1:41.11.
- 6 September
  - Lars Michaelsen wins the first stage of the 1997 Vuelta a España and wears the leader's jersey for three days.
  - Hans Nielsen wins the 1987 Individual Speedway World Championship at the Olympic Stadium in Amsterdam.
- 12 October – Bo Hamburger wins silver in Men's road race at the 1997 UCI Road World Championships.

== Births ==
=== January–March ===
- 10 March – Emil Nielsen, handballer

=== April–June ===
- 27 April – Anders Antonsen, badminton player
- 20 May – Joakim Mæhle, footballer
- 28 May – Jacob Rasmussen, footballer

=== July–September ===
- 11 August – Saba, singer and musical theatre actress
- 19 August – Mia Blichfeldt, badminton player

=== October–December ===
- 6 October – Kasper Dolberg, professional footballer
- 28 October – Justin Shaibu, professional footballer
- 5 December – Clara Rugaard, actress
- 9 December – Alexander Bah, professional footballer

== Deaths ==
=== January–March ===
- 23 January – Hardy Rafn, actor (born 1930)
- 3 March – Finn Høffding, composer (born 1899)
- 10 March – Johannes Theodor Suhr, Roman Catholic bishop (born 1896)
- 15 March – Svend Wiig Hansen, sculptor and painter (born 1927)

=== April–June ===
- 15 June – Frode Jakobsen, politician (norn 1906)

=== July–September ===
- 5 August – Poul Møller, politician (born 1919)

=== October–December ===
- 5 November – Niels Macholm, painter and graphic artist (born 1915)
- 17 December – Marie Gudme Leth (born 1895)

== See also ==
- 1997 in Danish television
