= 1901 in Denmark =

- Decades: 1880s; 1890s; 1900s; 1910s; 1920s
- See also: Other events of 1901; List of years in Denmark

Events from the year 1901 in Denmark.

== Incumbents ==
- Monarch – Christian IX
- Prime minister – Hannibal Sehested (until 24 May), Johan Henrik Deuntzer

== Events ==
- 3 April – The 1901 Folketing election is held. It was the first use of a secret ballot in Denmark.
- 24 June – The Frilandsmuseet open-air museum is inaugurated in its present-day location north of Copenhagen.
- 24 July – Systemskiftet ("the change of system"): with the appointment of the Cabinet of Deuntzer, parliamentarism is instituted in Denmark, and with the exception of the Easter Crisis of 1920 no Danish government since 1901 has been formed against the vote of a majority of the members of the Folketing.
- 30 August – A royal decree opens the King's Gate to Rosenborg Castle Garden, at the corner of Gothersgade and Kronprinsessegade, to the public.
- 25 September – The Ny Carlsberg Foundation is established.
- 28 November – Øksnehallen opens in the Meatpacking District in Copenhagen.

=== Undated ===
- The first automobile is registered in Copenhagen.
- The first kindergarten with public support in Denmark is established and inaugurated at Enghave Plads in the Vesterbro district of Copenhagen. Private kindergartens had been known since 1871.

== Culture ==
=== Music ===
- 4 October – Carl Nielsen's String Quartet No. 3 is for the first time performed in public in the small hall of the Odd Fellows Mansion in Copenhagen.

== Sports ==
- 28 March – Skive IK is founded.
- 14 July – Thorvald Ellegaard wins gold in men's sprint at the 1901 UCI Track Cycling World Championships.

== Births ==
=== January–March ===
- 20 February – Mogens Lassen, architect (died 1987)
- 28 March – Carl Henrik Clemmensen, journalist and editor (died 1943)

=== April–June ===
- 3 May – Ebbe Schwartz, football (died 1964)

=== July–September ===
- 9 July – Peter Sekaer, photographer (died 1950)
- 25 August – Kjeld Abell, playwright (died 1961)

== Deaths ==
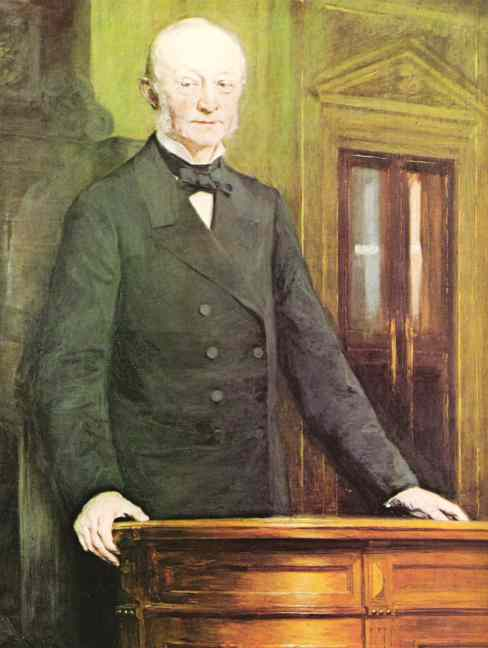
Carl Frederik Rietgen.

=== January–March ===
- 1 January – Sophus Schandorph, poet (born 1836)
- 19 January – Henrik August Flindt, landscape architect (born 1822)
- 6 February – Christian Frederik Lütken, zoologist ad naturalist (born 1827)

=== October–December ===
- 19 October – Carl Frederik Tietgen, industrialist and banker (born 1829)
- 31 October – Frederik Christian Lund, painter and illustrator (born 1826)
- 16 November – Theobald Stein, sculptor (born 1829)
- 28 November – Ludvig Grundtvig, photographer (born 1836)
