= 1972 in Denmark =

- Decades: 1950s; 1960s; 1970s; 1980s; 1990s
- See also: Other events of 1972; List of years in Denmark

Events from the year 1972 in Denmark.

== Incumbents ==
- Monarch – Frederik IX (until 14 January), Margrethe II
- Prime minister – Jens Otto Krag (until 5 October), Anker Jørgensen

== Events ==
January

- 14 January: King Fredrick IX of Denmark dies. He is succeeded by his oldest daughter, Queen Margrethe II.
- 24 June – The funeral of Frederick IX takes place at Roskilde Cathedral.

Roskilde Museum

June

- 17 June: Nordic students leaving Copenhagen following a meeting for Scandinavian students.

October

- 2 October – 1972 Danish European Communities membership referendum takes place.
- 11 November – The Æpwer Saxony Storm hits Denmark.

== Culture ==
=== Music ===
- List of number-one singles of 1972 (Denmark)

== Births ==
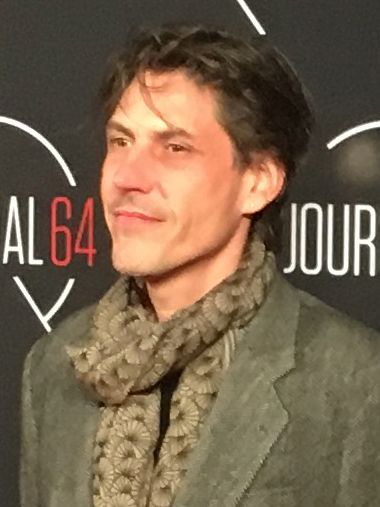
Anthony Lledo.

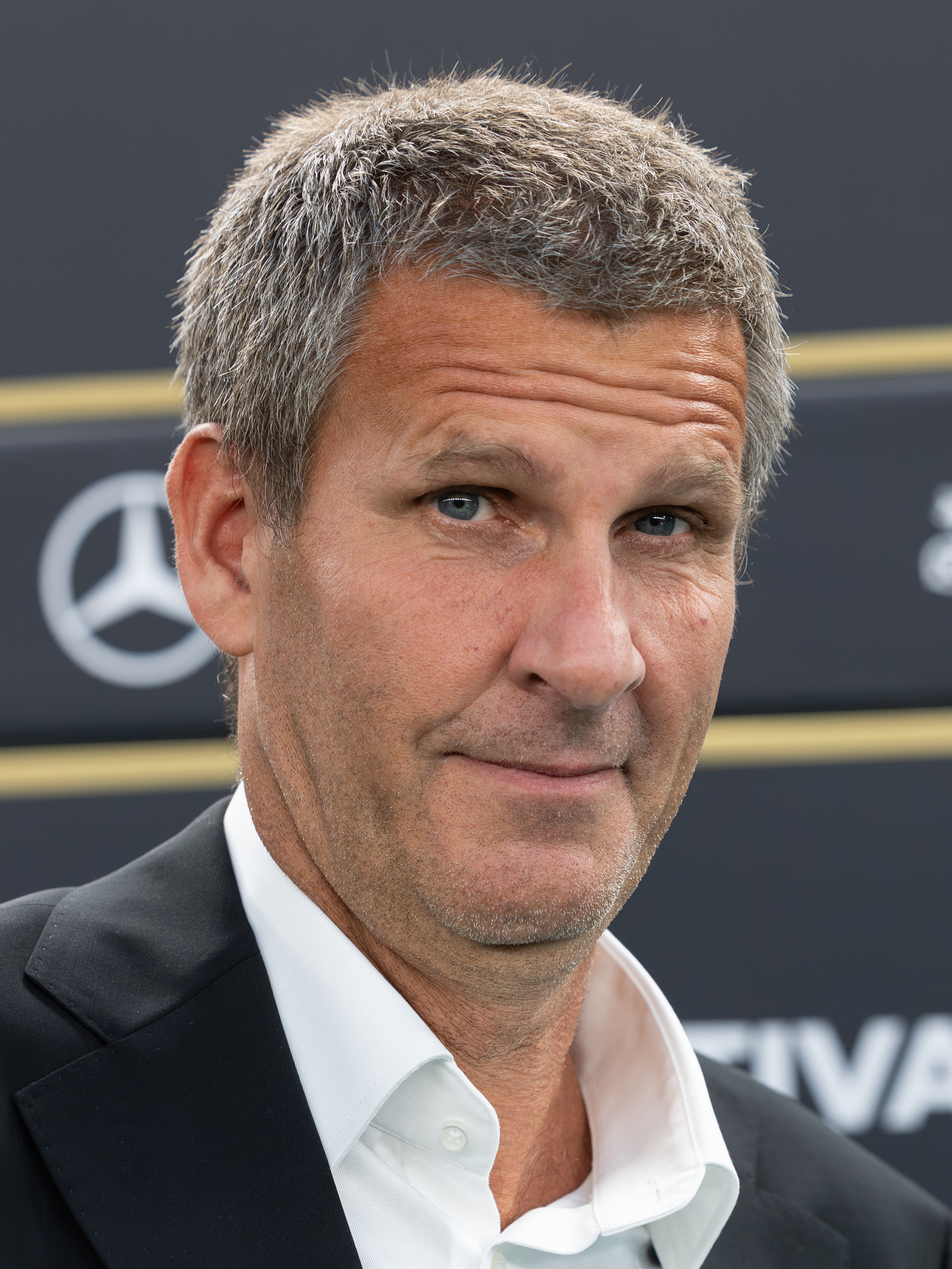
Anders Thomas Jensen.

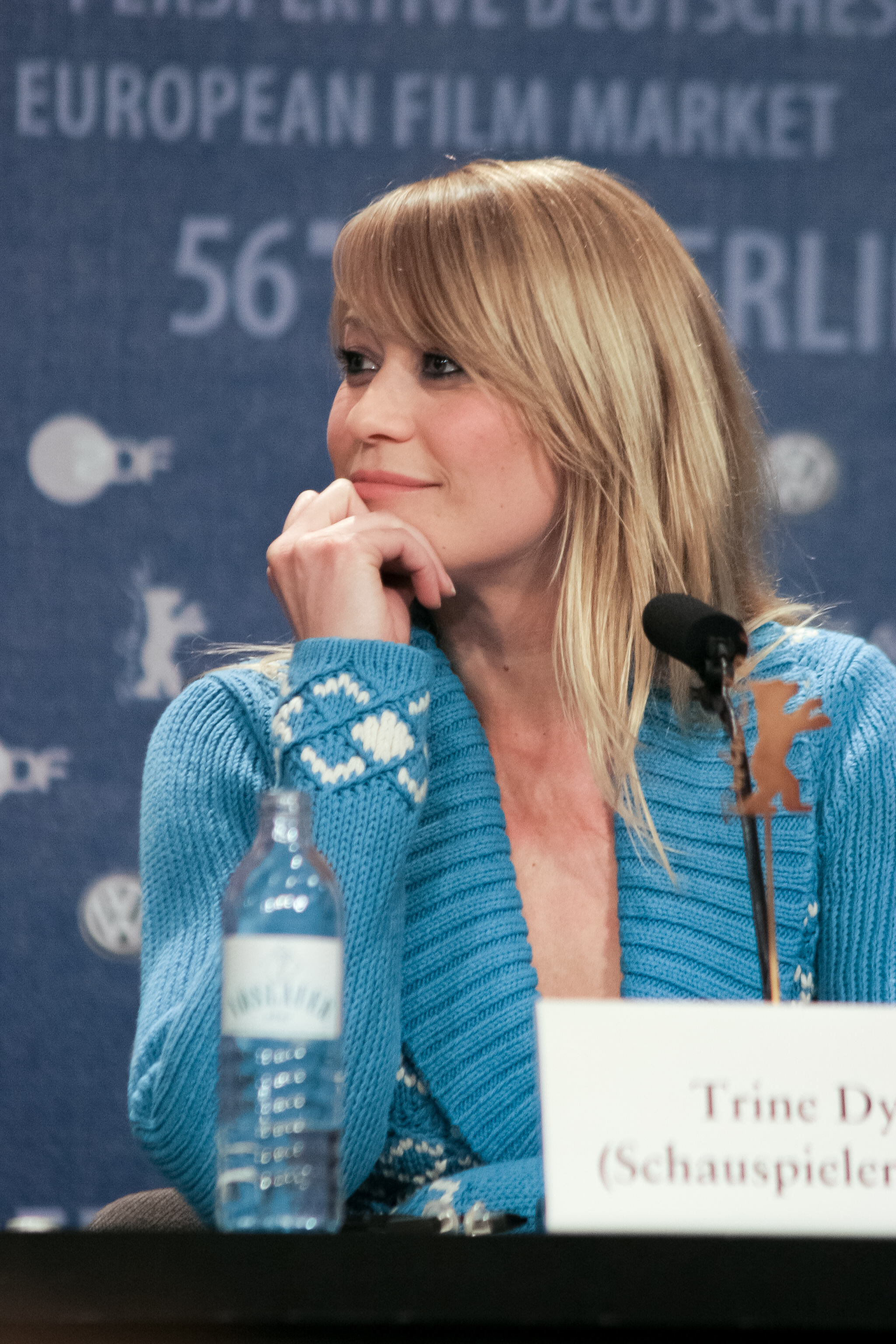
Trine Dyrholm.

=== January–March ===
- 11 January – Anthony Lledo, composer.
- 16 January – Ruben Bagger, footballer
- 3 February – Jesper Kyd, composer and sound designer
- 16 March – Nicolas Bro, actor
- 23 March – Peter Møller, footballer and sports journalist

=== April–June ===
- 6 April – Anders Thomas Jensen, film director
- 7 April – Kristina Miskowiak Beckvard, diplomat
- 9 April – Kasper Hjulmand, football coach
- 15 April – Trine Dyrholm, actress
- 18 April – Lars Christiansen, handball player
- 24 April – Anne Dorthe Tanderup, handball player
- 12 May – Signe Kongebro, architect
- 27 May – Eskild Ebbesen, lightweight rower
- 28 May – Roland Møller, actor
- 5 June – Johan Kobborg, ballet dancer
- 24 June – Mads Brügger, filmmaker, television host and media executive

=== July–September ===
- 19 July – Ebbe Sand, footballer
- 25 August – Nikolaj Arcel, filmmaker
- 30 September – Ari Behn, Norwegian author, playwright, and visual artist (died 2019)

=== October–December ===
- 3 October – Lasse Heje Pedersen, economist
- 5 October – Henrik Vibskov, fashion designer
- 7 October – Maren Uthaug, writer and cartoonist
- 16 October – Trentemøller, composer and musician
- 4 November – Anders Holch Povlsen, businessman
- 14 December – Christian E. Christiansen, filmmaker
- 21 December – Ole Birk Olesen, politician

== Deaths ==
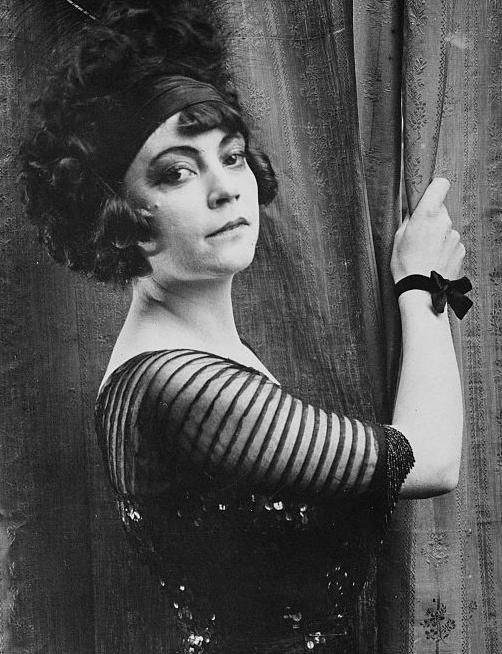
Asta Nielsen.

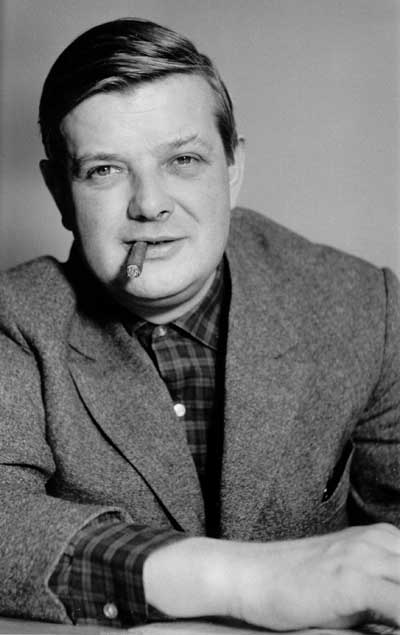
Børge Mogensen.

=== January–March ===
- 9 January – Helga Frier, actress (born 1893)
- 10 January – Aksel Larsen, politician (born 1897)
- 14 January – King Frederik IX (born 1899)

=== April–June ===
- 2 May – Ole Ring, painter (born 1902)
- 24 May – Asta Nielsen, actress (born 1881)

=== July–September ===
- 7 July – Johan Jacobsen, film director (born 1914)
- 22 August – Axel Poulsen, sculptor (born 1887)

=== October–December ===
- 5 October – Børge Mogensen, furniture designer (born 1914)
- 7 October – Erik Eriksen, politician (born 1902)
- 6 December – Gunnar Strømvad, actor (born 1908)

== See also ==
- 1972 in Danish television
