= 1903 in Denmark =

- Decades: 1880s; 1890s; 1900s; 1910s; 1920s
- See also: Other events of 1903; List of years in Denmark

Events from the year 1903 in Denmark.

== Incumbents ==
- Monarch – Christian IX
- Prime minister – Johan Henrik Deuntzer

== Events ==
January

- January – 1903 Danish local elections are held.

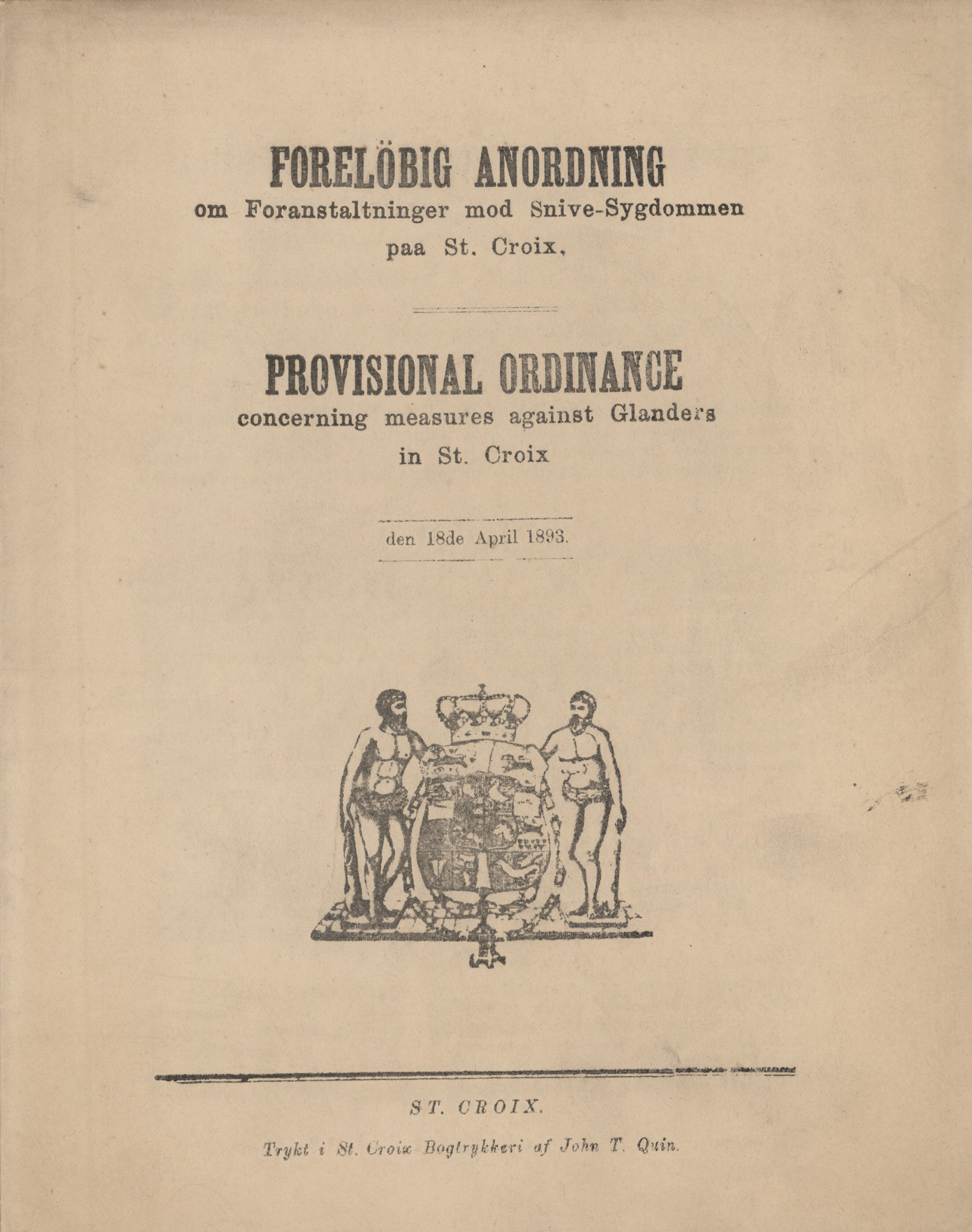
18 April: Provisional Ordinance concerning measures against Glanders in St. Croix.

March

- 2 March – A Social Democrat is elected as lord mayor in Copenhagen for the first time.

April

- 18 April – The local government of Saint Croix in the Danish West Indies issues a provisional Ordinance concerning measures against Glanders in St. Croix

June

- 16 June – The 1903 Danish Folketing election is held.
- 30 September – The Gjedser-Warnemünde ferry route is inaugurated.

=== Undated ===
- The Christmas Stamp Foundation is established.
- The new Frederiksberg Hospital is inaugurated.
- The cakewalk reaches Copenhagen.
- Motor ferries start to operate in the Port of Copenhagen.

== Cilture ==
- The Thorvaldsen Exhibition Medal is awarded to Julius Paulsen for the painting Portrait of a Lady (Et dameportræt).

== Sports ==
- 2 May – Boldklubben 1903 is founded.
- 16–22 August – The 1903 UCI Track Cycling World Championships are held in Copenhagen.
  - Thorvald Ellegaard wins gold in men's sprint for the third year in a row.

== Births ==
- 10 January – Jens August Schade, poet (died 1978)
- 21 April – Hans Hedtoft, politician, former prime minister (died 1955)
- 23 June – Hans Christian Branner, writer (died 1966)
- 30 July – Anna Borg, Danish-Icelandic actress (died 1963)
- 19 August – Aage Dons, author (died 1993)
- 16 September – Ole Wanscher, furniture designer (died 1985)
- 28 November – Willy Gervin, cyclist (died 1951)

== Deaths ==
- 11 May – Vilhelm Kyhn, painter and educator (born 1819)
- 3 May – Louise Nimb, restaurateur (born 1842)
- 12 October – Erhard Frederiksen, agriculturalist (born 1843)
- 11 December – Heinrich Tønnies, photographer (born 1825)
