= Hermann Zobel =

Danish equestrian

Personal information
- Nationality: Danish
- Born: 25 July 1908; Copenhagen, Denmark
- Died: 27 September 1995 (aged 87); Odder, Denmark

Sport
- Sport: Equestrian

Hermann Zobel (25 July 1908 – 27 September 1995) was a Danish equestrian. He competed in two events at the 1956 Summer Olympics.
