= Harald Salomon =

Danish medallist and sculptor

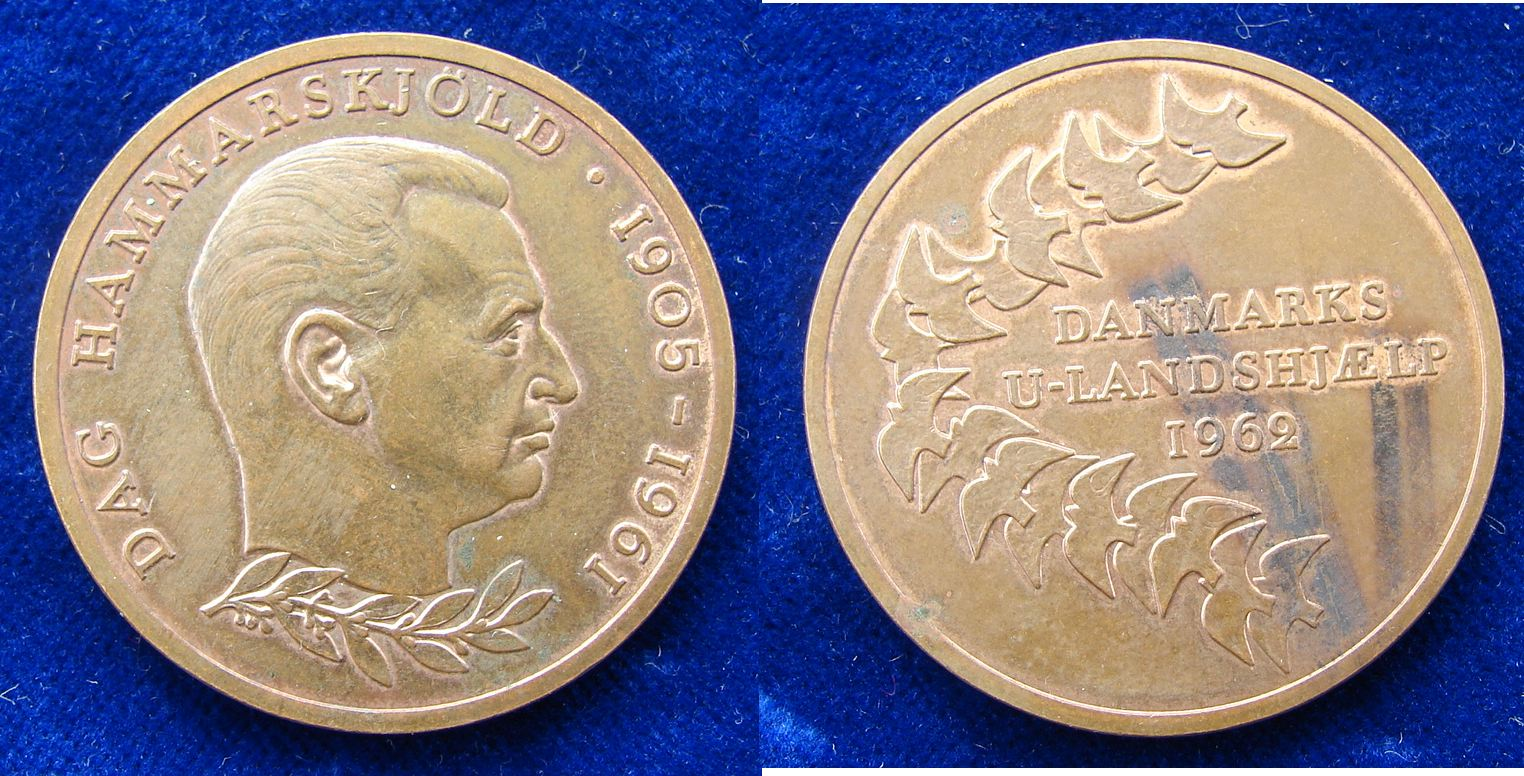
1962 Danish Foreign Aid Medal.

Harald Salomon (8 May 1900 – 10 September 1990) was a Norwegian-Danish sculptor and medallist. He was chief medallist at the Royal Danish Mint from 1933 to 1968.

== Early life and education ==
Salomon was educated as a sculptor at the Royal Danish Academy of Fine Arts under Einar Utzon-Frank in 1922-27.

== Career ==
In 1933-68, Salomon served as Chief Medallist at the Royal Danish Mint. He created the last Danish coins issued during the reign of Christian X and all Danish coins Frederik IX. He designed a total of 222 Danish coins and medals.

== Gallery ==
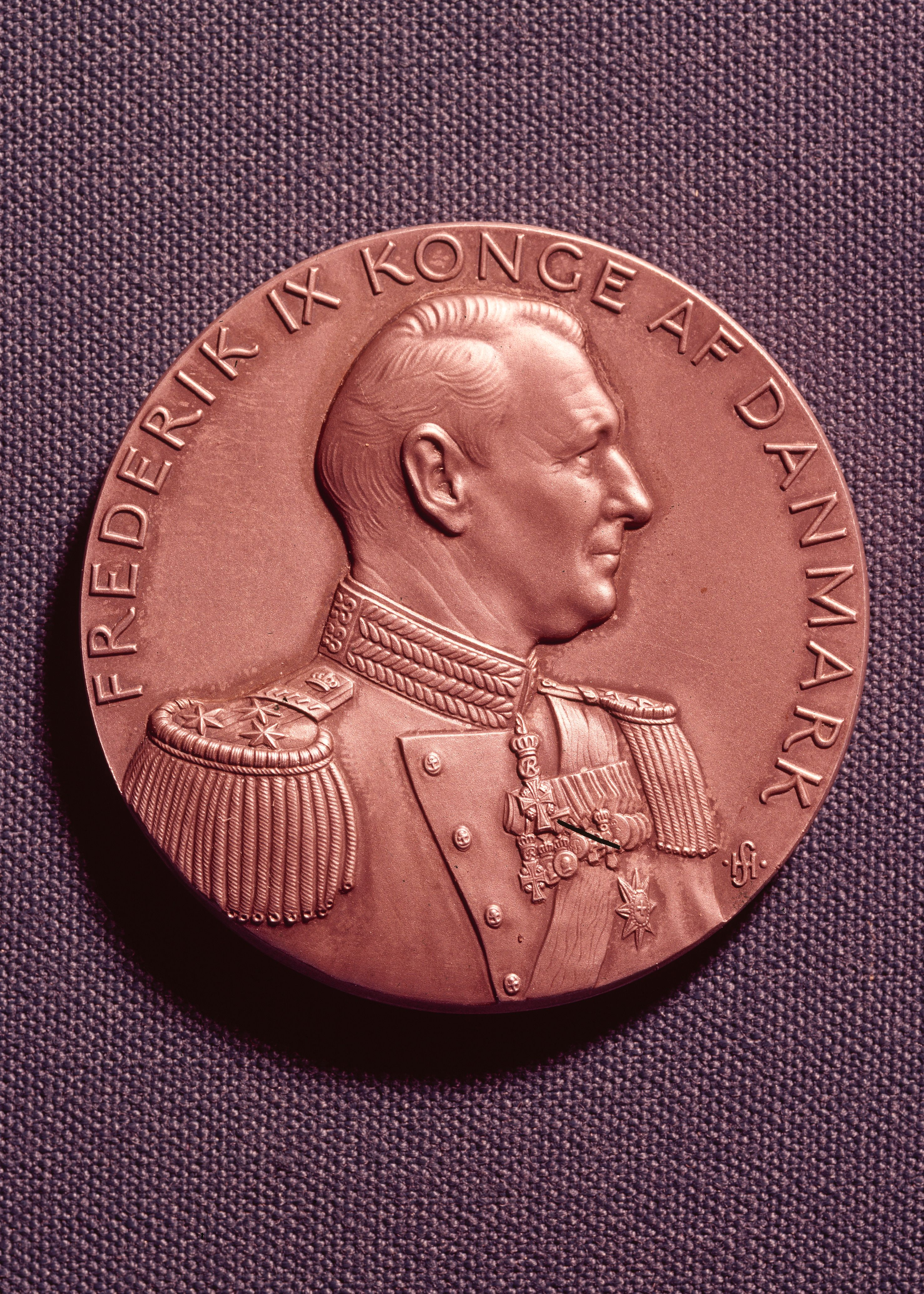
Frederik IX 50 år 1949.

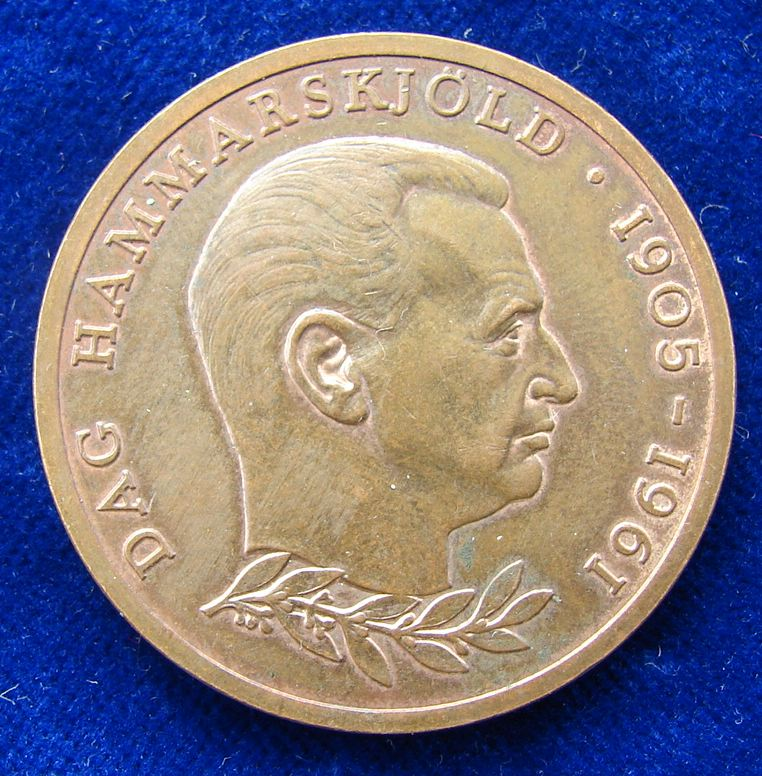
Hammarskjöld Medal.

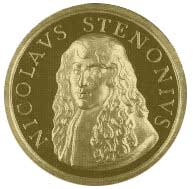
Steno Medal.
