= 1994 in Denmark =

- Decades: 1970s; 1980s; 1990s; 2000s; 2010s
- See also: Other events of 1994; List of years in Denmark

Events from the year 1994 in Denmark.

== Incumbents ==
- Monarch – Margrethe II
- Prime minister – Poul Nyrup Rasmussen

== Events ==
- 1 January – Capital punishment in Denmark is officially outlawed in all cases.
- 5 April – 3 die and 2 are injured in the Aarhus University shooting.
- 29 April – Danish forces within the United Nations Protection Force take part in Operation Bøllebank in response to the Bosnian War.
- 27 May – The first European Conference on Sustainable Cities & Towns is held Aalborg, resulting in the Aalborg Charter.
- 9 June – The 1994 European Parliament election in Denmark are held, electing 16 members to the European Parliament.
- 7 July – The 1994 Faroese general election is held.
- 21 September – The 1994 Danish general election is held.
- 27 September – Following the general election, the Poul Nyrup Rasmussen II Cabinet is formed.
- 25 October – Danish peacekeeping forces conduct Operation Amanda, a United Nations Protection Force mission within the Bosnian War.

== Arts ==
- The 11th Robert Awards are held. Bille August'sThe House of the Spirits wins Best Danish Film and Best Screenplay.

== Sports ==
=== Badminton ===
- Lillerød BK wins Europe Cup.

=== Cycling ===
- 2 July – 1994 Tour de France
  - 10 July – Bo Hamburger wins the 8th stage
  - 16 July – Bjarne Riis wins the 13th stage
- 19 August – Jesper Skibby wins the 1994 Ronde van Nederland.
- 21–28 August Alex Pedersen wins gold in the Men's amateur road race at the 1994 UCI Road World Championships.
- September – Rolf Sørensen wins the Paris–Brussels road cycling race.
- Kurt Betschart (SUI) and Bruno Risi (SUI) win the Six Days of Copenhagen six-day track cycling race.

=== Football ===
- 12 May – Brøndby IF wins the 1993–94 Danish Cup by defeating Næstved BK 3–1 after penalties in the final.

=== Other ===
- 10–17 April – With two gold medals, three silver medals and four bronze medals, Denmark finishes as the second best nation at the 14th European Badminton Championships in Den Bosch, Netherlands.
- September 1 – Erik Gundersen wins the 1984 Individual Speedway World Championship.
- 25 September – Denmark wins gold at the 1994 European Women's Handball Championship in Germany by defeating host country 27–23 in the final.

== Births ==
=== January–March ===
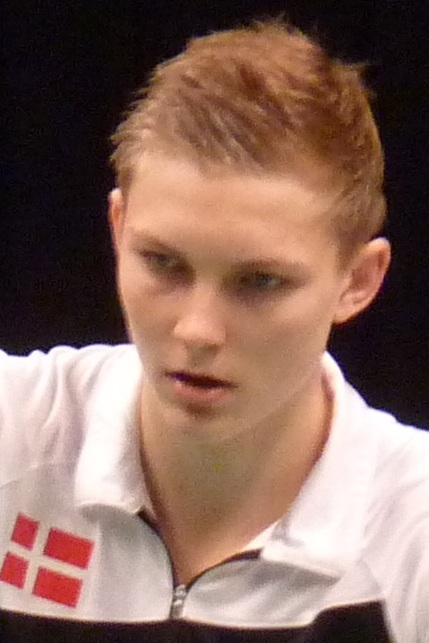
Viktor Axelsen.

- 4 January – Viktor Axelsen, badminton player
- 127 January – Philip Arctander, architect (born 1017)
- 31 January – Kenneth Zohore, footballer
- 10 February – Simone Christensen, BMX rider

=== April–June ===
- 20 April – Line Kjærsfeldt, badminton player
- 14 May – Pernille Blume, swimmer
- 9 June – Viktor Fischer, footballer

=== July–September ===
- 15 August – Lasse Vigen Christensen, footballer
- 12 September – Amalie Thomsen, canoeist

=== October–December ===
- 1 October – Frederik Vad, politician
- 23 October – Nanna Koerstz Madsen, golfer
- 30 November – Ida Villumsen, canoeist
- 16 December – Philip Zinckernagel, footballer

== Deaths ==
Niels Kaj Jerne.

- 13 April – Jørgen Buckhøj, actor (born 1935)
- 28 June – Ulrik Neumann, actor (born 1918)
- 25 September – Paul Høm, artist (born 1905)
- 7 October – Niels Kaj Jerne, immunologist (born 1911)

== See also ==
- 1994 in Danish television
