= 1903 Danish local elections =

Regional elections were held in Denmark in January 1903. 358 municipal council members were elected among the upper class. Furthermore, the middle class elected 3757 sogne (singular sogn) council members, and the upper classes elected 4832 sogne council members.
