= 1992 in Denmark =

- Decades: 1970s; 1980s; 1990s; 2000s; 2010s
- See also: Other events of 1992; List of years in Denmark

Events from the year 1992 in Denmark.

== Incumbents ==
- Monarch – Margrethe II
- Prime minister – Poul Schlüter

== Events ==
- 21–22 June – A European Council was held in Bella Center, Copenhagen leading to the formulation of the Copenhagen Criteria.

== The arts ==
- Lars von Trier and Peter Aalbæk Jensen founds Zentropa.
- May – Bille August's film The Best Intentions wins the Palme d'Or at the 45th Cannes Film Festival.

== Sports ==
- 25 July – 9 August – Denmark at the 1992 Summer Olympics in Barcelona: 1 gold medal, 1 silver medal and 4 bronze medals.

=== Badminton ===
- 17–21 March – Thomas Lund and Pernille Dupont win gold in mixed double at the 1992 All England Open Badminton Championships.
- 12–18 April – With four gold medals, six silver medals and one bronze medal, Denmark finishes as the best nation at the 13th European Badminton Championships in Glasgow, Scotland.

=== Cycling ===
- March – Rolf Sørensen wins the Tirreno–Adriatico cycle race in Italy.
- September – Rolf Sørensen wins the Paris–Brussels road cycling race.
- Danny Clark (AUS) and Urs Freuler (SUI) win the Six Days of Copenhagen six-day track cycling race.

=== Football ===
- 30 May – Denmark national team are entered into the European Championships in Sweden after Yugoslavia, who beat them to qualification six months prior, are banned from the competition due to United Nations sanctions resulting from the nation's political problems.
- 10 –26 June – Denmark national team competes at UEFA Euro 1992.
  - 11 June – Denmark's first match ends in a goalless draw against England in Malmö.
  - 14 June – Sweden defeats the Danish team 1–0 in Solna.
  - 17 June – Denmark beat France 2–1 in their final group game (with goals from Henrik Larsen and Lars Elstrup) in Malmö, and reach the semi-finals thanks to England's 2–1 defeat by Sweden.
  - 22 June – Henrik Larsen scores twice as Denmark draw 2–2 with Holland in the Euro 92 semi-final in Gothenburg, and a victory in the penalty shoot-out takes them to the final.
  - 26 June – Denmark becomes European football champions, winning the final 2–0 against Germany in Stockholm with goals from John Jensen and Kim Vilfort.

=== Other ===
- 4 September – Johnny Bredahl becomes super-featherweight boxing champions by defeating José Quirino in Copenhagen.

== Births ==
=== January–March ===
- 2 January – Cathrine Dufour, dressage rider
- 7 January – Mark Gundelach, football player
- 15 January – Rasmus Falk, football player
- 25 January – Mikkel Cramer, football player
- 28 January – Simone Egeriis, singer
- 11 February – Lasse Norman Leth, road cyclist
- 14 February – Christian Eriksen, football player
- 15 February – Nicolai Boilesen, football player
- 18 February – Michael Jepsen Jensen, speedway rider
- 23 February – Markus Kilsgaard, alpine skier
- 22 March – Oğuzhan Aynaoğlu, football player
- 26 March – Nina Agdal, model

=== April–June ===
- 11 April – Sinem Dybvad Demir, politician
- 14 April – Frederik Sørensen, football player
- 24 April – Nina Hollensen, rower
- 1 May – Jakob Haugaard, footballer
- 18 May – Emma Klingenberg, orienteering competitor
- 27 June – Gilli, rapper and actor

=== July–September ===
- 3 July – Karen Barbat, tennis player
- 4 July – Anis Basim Moujahid, pop singer and songwriter
- 3 August – Jannik Vestergaard, footballer
- 6 August – Christian Sørensen, footballer
- 23 August – Mads Dittmer Hvilsom, footballer
- 16 September – Jonas Knudsen, footballer

=== October–December ===
- 5 October – Kevin Magnussen, racing driver
- 9 October – Martin Hoberg Hedegaard, singer
- 1 November – Mikkel Agger, football player
- 10 November – Anne Dsane Andersen, rower
- 6 December – Jeppe Andersen, football player
- 18 December – Mikkel Mac, racing driver
- 15 November – Pernille Harder, football player

== Deaths ==
- 6 January – Bent Christensen, film director (born 1929)
- 20 June – Acton Bjørn, architect and designer (born 1910)
- 15 September – Mogens Koch, architect and designer (born 1898)
- 18 September – Princess Margaret of Denmark (born 1895)

== See also ==
- 1992 in Danish television
