= Køge Savings Bank =

Danish savings bank

- Native name: Sparekassen for Kjøge og Omegn
- Company type: Savings bank
- Industry: Financial services
- Founded: June 25, 1836
- Defunct: Unknown
- Fate: Unknown
- Headquarters: Køge, Denmark
- Products: Savings accounts, mortgages

Køge Savings Bank was a Danish savings bank based in køge, Denmark. The former main building at Torvet 14 dates from 1914.

== History ==
Køge Savings Bank was established on 25 June 1836.

An architectural competition for the design of a new main building was launched in 1912. The competition was won by G, N. Gansen. He is also known for the design of buildings such as Store Heddinge Watertower, Broksø Manor and Tøxen's School. The construction topped out on 1 August 1913. The building was completed in 1914.
