= Thorvald Hagedorn-Olsen =

Danish painter

- Born: 1 June 1902; Svendborg, Denmark
- Died: 20 January 1996 (aged 93); Oppe Sundby, Denmark
- Occupation: Painter

Thorvald Hagedorn-Olsen (1 June 1902 – 20 January 1996) was a Danish painter. His work was part of the painting event in the art competition at the 1936 Summer Olympics.

== Training ==
Thorvald Hagedorn-Olsen initially trained as a painting apprentice (malersvend) before going to Paris in 1924–1925 to study under the artist Othon Friesz. Upon returning, he enrolled at the Royal Danish Academy of Fine Arts in Copenhagen from 1926 to 1929, where he studied under instructors such as Sigurd Wandel and Ejnar Nielsen. He began exhibiting his works publicly in the late 1920s and participated in major exhibitions across Denmark.
