= Niels Christian Frederiksen =

Danish economist and politician (1840–1905)

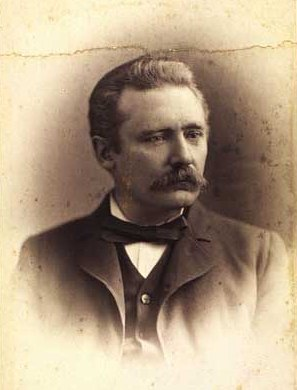
- Born: 23 March 1840; Fuglsang, Denmark
- Died: 4 November 1905 (aged 65); Copenhagen, Denmark
- Education: University of Copenhagen
- Occupations: Economist; politician; businessman

Niels Christian Frederiksen (Friderichsen) (23 March 1840 – 4 November 1905) was a Danish economist, politician, and businessman. He was a professor at the University of Copenhagen and a member of Folketinget.

== Early life and education ==
Frederiksen was born on 23 March 1840 at Fuglsang Manor on Lolland, the son of Johan D. Friderichsen (1791–1861) and Maria Hansen (1811–1901). He enrolled at the University of Copenhagen to study political science, where he won a gold medal for his thesis on the relationship between grain prices and wages. He graduated in 1862.

== Career ==
Frederiksen became a full professor at the University of Copenhagen in 1867. He wrote about economics and agricultural reforms for Fædrelandet. In 1866, he was elected for Folketinget, aligning at various points with Højre, Venstre, and the short-lived Mellempartiet.

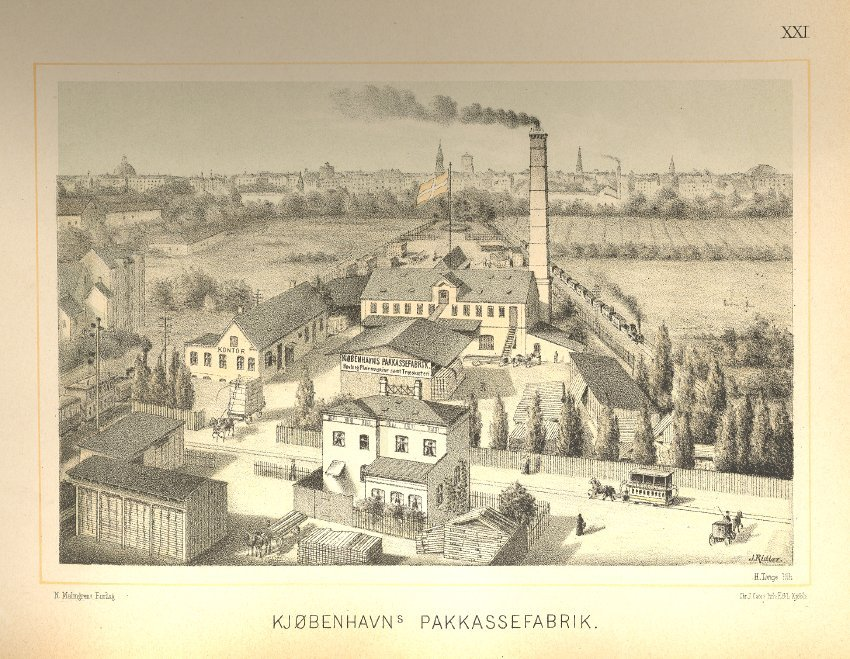
Kjøbenhavns Papkassefabrik

Frederiksen ran commercial ventures alongside his work in academia and politics. He established saw mills in Sweden and later obtained licensing to operate as a merchant.

In 1874, Frederiksen established Kjøbenhavns Papkassefabrik. Initially located in Farimagsgade, it soon relocated to larger premises on H. C. Ørsteds Vej before he sold the business in 1876. He co-founded Landmandsbanken, but heavy borrowing left him bankrupt. He emigrated to America, where he formed a new company involved in purchasing and selling land in the American West. After initial prosperity, he became bankrupt again. He returned to Copenhagen where he was active as a businessman and writer before his death on 4 November 1905.

== Personal life ==
Frederiksen married Ada Maria Monrad (19 April 1841 – 2 December 1915) on 1 May 1865 in Kongens Lyngby. They had seven children, only one of whom survived to adulthood.
