= 1830 in Denmark =

- Decades: 1810s; 1820s; 1830s; 1840s; 1850s
- See also: Other events of 1830; List of years in Denmark

Events from the year 1830 in Denmark.

== Incumbents ==
- Monarch – Frederick VI
- Prime minister – Otto Joachim

== Events ==
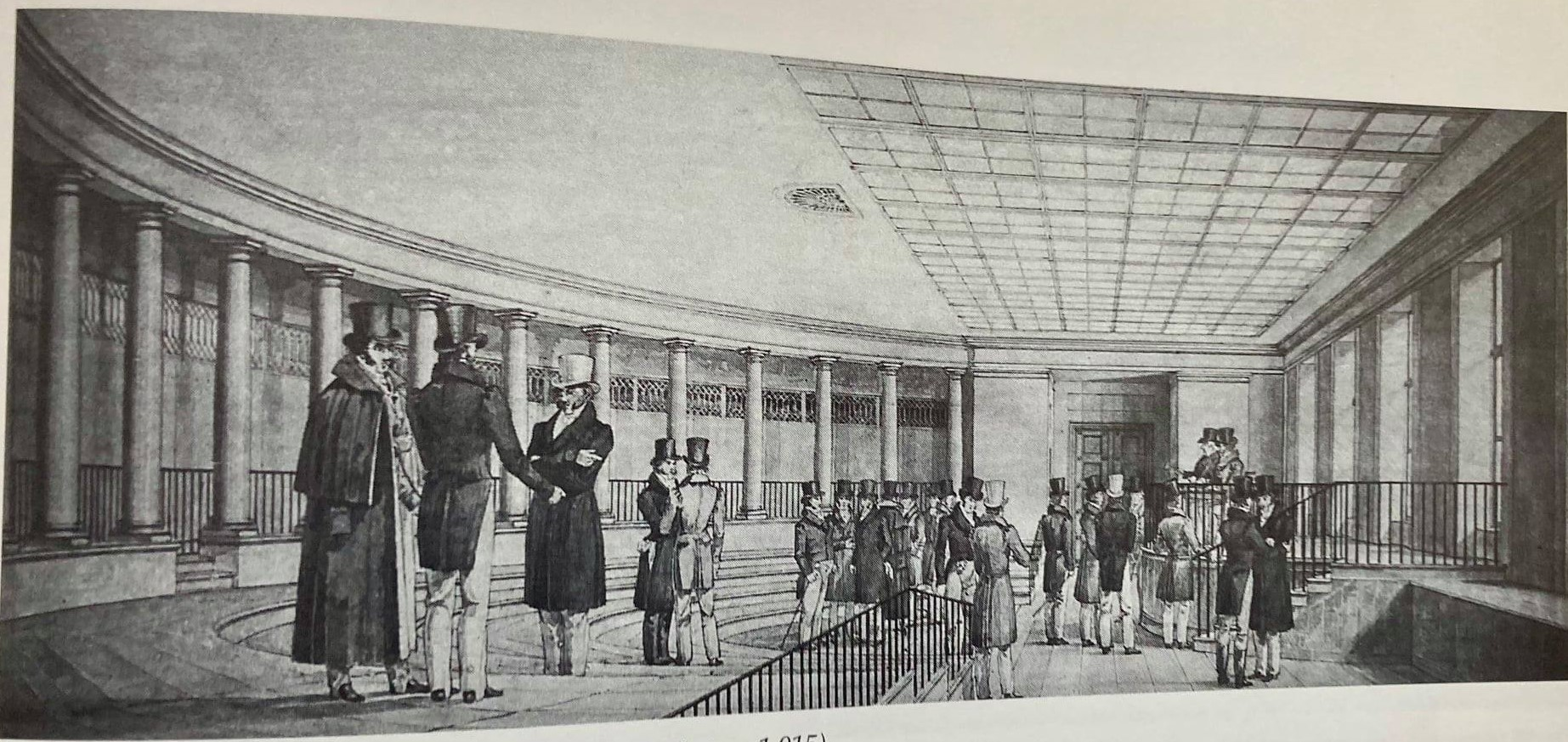
Interior of Børsen, illustrated 1830 by H.F.F. Holm.

May

- 3 May – The Royal Danish Defence College is established by Frederik VI.

June

- 12 June – The steam ship PS Frederik den Sjette is launched in Copenhagen. It replaces PS Caledonia on the route between Copenhagen and Kiel.

September

- 15 September HDMS Bellona is launched at Nyholm in Copenhagen.

=== Undated ===
- The settlements of Alluitsup Paa, Kitsissuarsuit, Narsaq, and Qeqertaq are established in Greenland.

== Culture ==
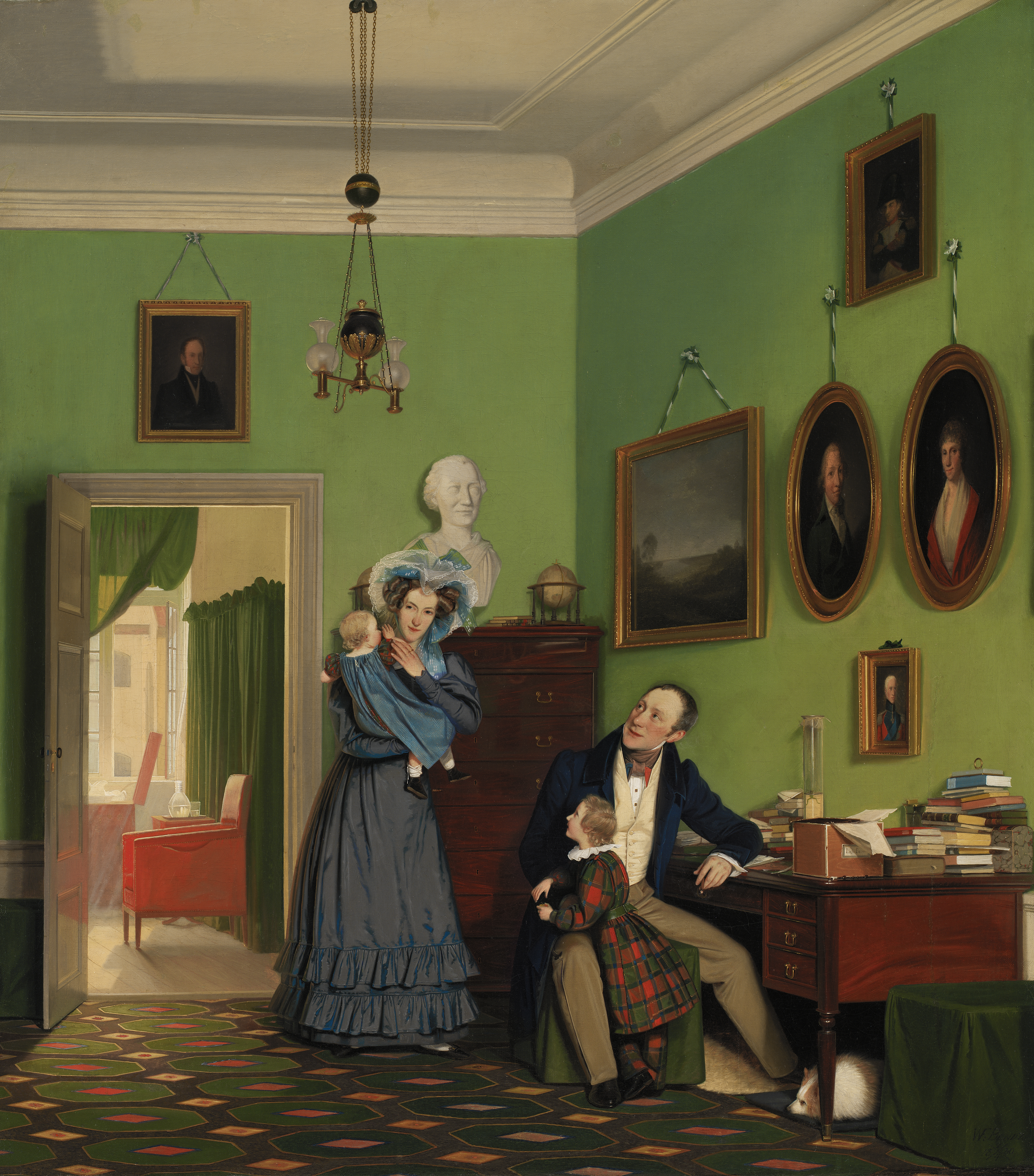
Familien Waagepetersen, depicting Christian Waagepetersen and his family. Oil on canvas, Wilhelm Bendz, 1830.

=== Architecture and design ===
- The C.F. Hansen Medaillen is introduced to mark the 50th anniversary of Christian Frederik Hansen's appointment.

=== Visual arts ===
- 1 April – The annual Charlottenborg Spring Exhibition opens
  - 7 April – Wilhelm Bendz's painting The Waagepetersen Family is included in the exhibition.

=== Performing arts ===
- August Bournonville replaces Pierre Larcher as Ballet Master of the Royal Danish Ballet.

== Births ==
=== January–March ===
- 10 February – Alfhilda Mechlenburg, writer (died 1907)

=== April–June ===
- 7 April – Jens Levin Tvede, distillerm industrialist and (died 1891)
- 18 April – Louise Bille-Brahe, court member (died 1910)
- 24 May – Henrik Olrik, painter (died 1890)
- 13 December – Mathilde Fibiger, feminist, novelist and telegraphist (died 1872)

=== October–December ===
- 14 December – Harald Hirschsprung, businessman (died 1916)

== Deaths ==
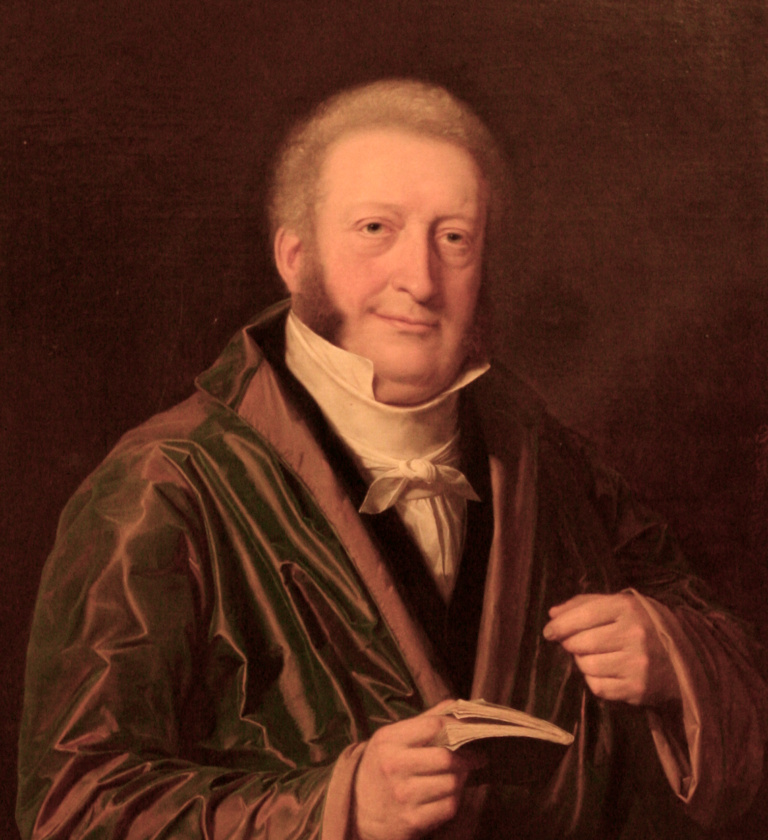
Peter Jørgen Frydendahl.

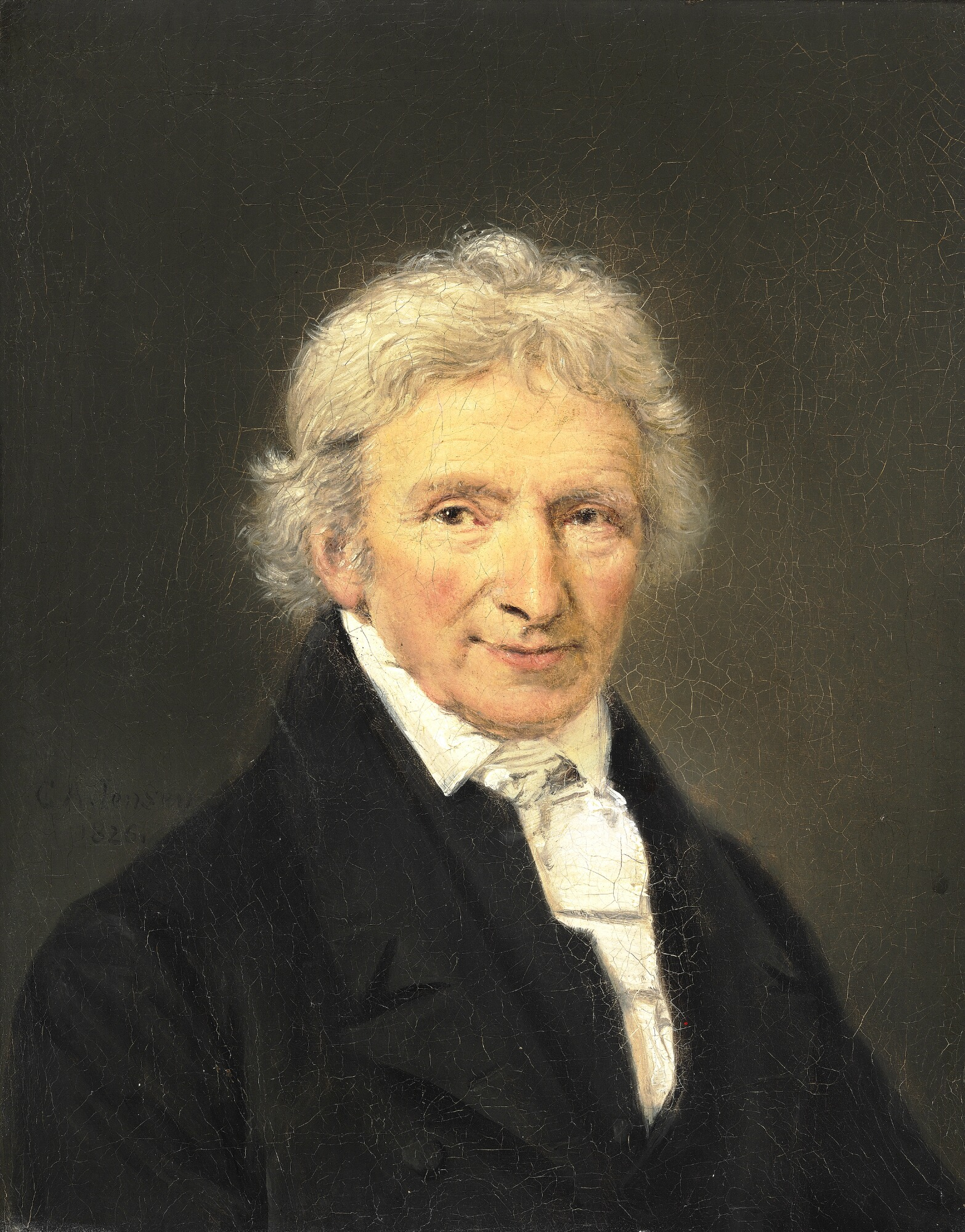
Salomon Ahron Jacobson.

=== January–March ===
- 20 February – Peter Jørgen Frydendahl, actor (born 1766)
- 27 February – Rasmus Kirketerp, busiessman (born 1747)

=== April–June ===
- 9 April – Friedrich Münter. scholar, theologian and bishop (born 1761)
- 22 April – Knud Lyne Rahbek, literary historian, critic, writer, poet, magazine editor and art administrator (born 1760)
- 14 May – Urban Jürgensen, clockmaker (born 1776)
- 9 June – Andreas Buntzen, businessman (born 1781)
- 28 June – Salomon Ahron Jacobson, medallist, sculptor, engraver (born 1755)

=== July–September ===
- 4 July – Jens Bloch, theologian and bishop (born 1761)
- 11 August – Christopher Schøller Bülow, landoiwner and government official (born 1770)
- 15 August – Caspar Conrad Rafn, county governor (born 1763)

=== October–December ===
- 9 December – Heinrich Christian Friedrich Schumacherm physician (born 1757)
