= 1831 in Denmark =

- Decades: 1810s; 1820s; 1830s; 1840s; 1850s
- See also: Other events of 1831; List of years in Denmark

Events from the year 1831 in Denmark.

== Incumbents ==
- Monarch – Frederick VI
- Prime minister – Otto Joachim

== Events ==
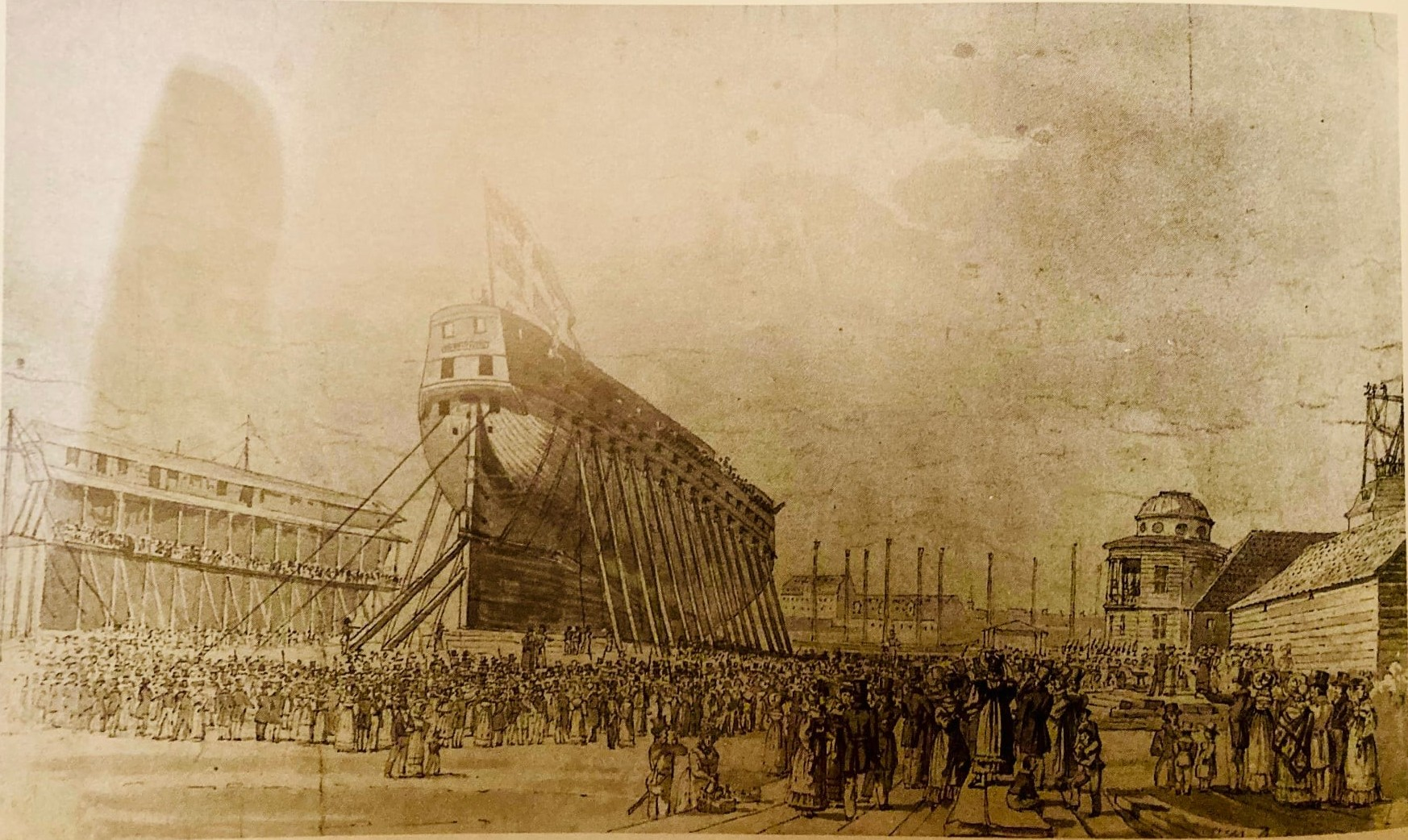
25 August: Frederik den Sjette.

- 2 April – HDMS Galathea is launched at Nyholm in Copenhagen.
- 25 August – The ship of the line HDMS Frederik den Sjette is launched at Nyholm.
- 13 September – HDMS Hvalfisken arrives back in Copenhagen, marking the end of the 1929–1831 Danish East Greenland Expedition.

== Births ==
=== January–March ===
- 28 January – Frederik Georg Emil Rostrup, botanist (died 1907)
- 30 January – Christine Daugaard, writer (died 1917)
- 15 February – Anton Dorph, painter (died 1914)
- 10 March – Johan Vilhelm Gertner, player (died 1871)

=== April–June ===
- 3 May – Hans Peter Ingerslev, politician (died 1896)
- 25 May – Christian Richardt, writer (died 1892)
- 6 June – Henry Jacques Garrigues, physician (died 1913 in the United States)

=== July–September ===
- 8 July – Sigfred Goldschmidt, businessman (died 1906)
- 27 July – Frits Holm, journalist, author and adventurer (died 1930 in the United States)
- 6 August – Henning Frederik Feilberg, pastor, author and folklorist (died 1921)
- 13 August – Juliette Price, ballet dancer (died 1896)
- 26 November – Christian Toxward, architect (died 1891 in New Zealand)
- 28 November – C. C. A. Christensen, painter (died 1912 in the United States)
- 7 December – Jakob Severin Deichmann Branth, theologian (died 1917)

== Deaths ==
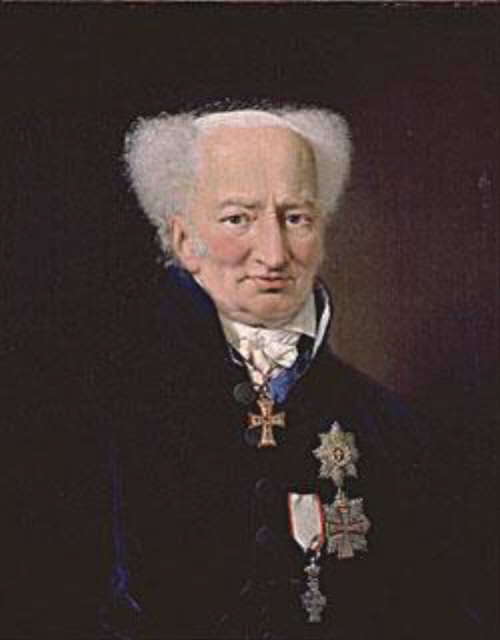
Ernst Heinrich von Schimmelmann.

=== January–March ===
- 12 January – Princess Louise of Denmark, princess (born 1750)
- 9 February – Ernst Heinrich von Schimmelmann, politician, businessman and patron of the arts (born 1747)
- 17 February – Friedrich Wilhelm, Duke of Schleswig-Holstein-Sonderburg-Glücksburg (born 1895)
- 21 March – Thøger From, businessman (born 1744)

=== April–June ===
- 21 April – Johann Georg Preisler, engraver (born 1757)
- 9 June – Johan Martin Schønheyder, Supreme Court attorney (born 1752)
- 17 June – Jens Friedenreich Hage, merchant and landowner (born 1752)

=== July–September ===
  - 11 September – Hans Bøchmann Melchior, naturalist (born 1773)
- 15 September – Christian David Gebauer, painter (born 1777)

=== October–December ===
- 5 November – Johan Frederik Clemens, engraver (born 1752)
- 30 November – Catharine Frydendahl, opera singer (born 1760)
