= 1753 in Denmark =

- Decades: 1730s; 1740s; 1750s; 1760s; 1770s
- See also: Other events of 1753; List of years in Denmark

Events from the year 1753 in Denmark.

== Incumbents ==
- Monarch – Frederick V
- Prime minister – Johan Ludvig Holstein-Ledreborg

== Events ==
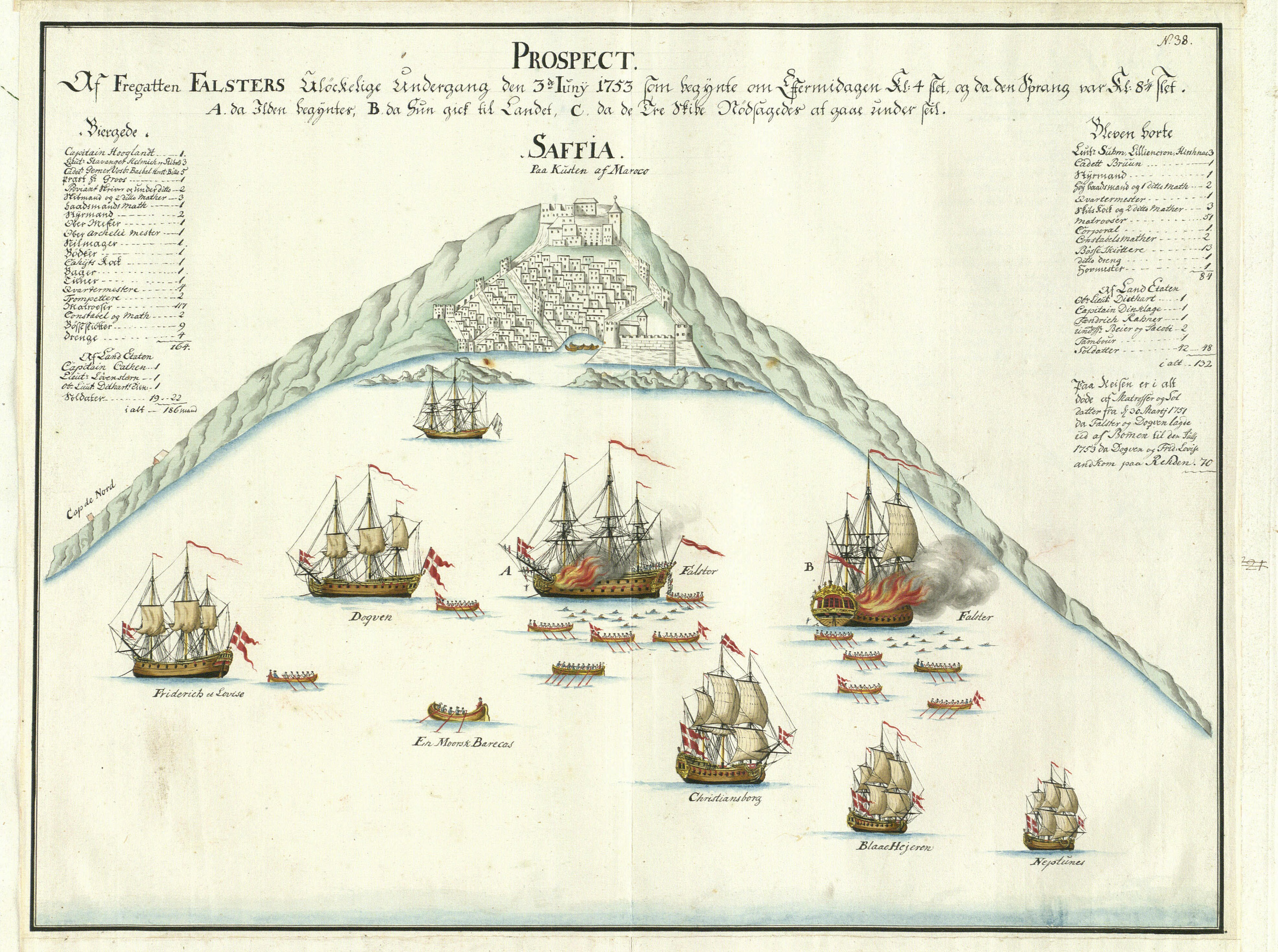
3 July

== Births ==
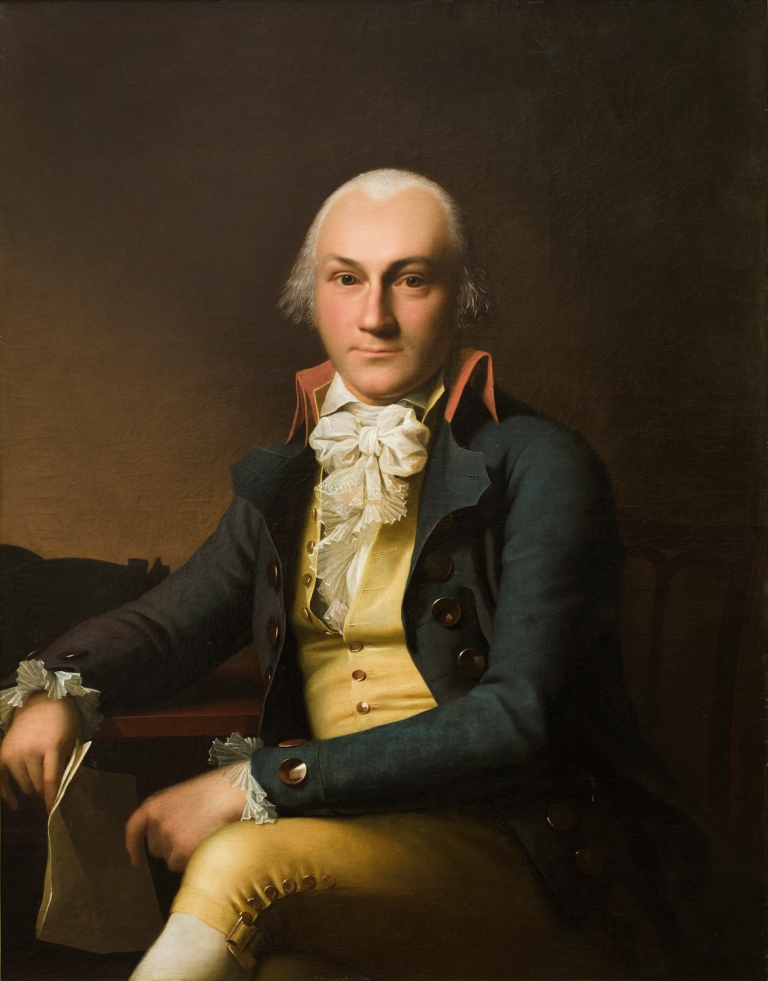
Adam Levin Søbøtker.

- 9 January – Frederik Carl Krag-Juel-Vind-Frijs, landowner, county governor, Supreme Court justice (died 1815)
- 23 May – Poul Skibsted, lawyer (died 1812)
- 3 August – Adam Levin Søbøtker, estate owner and general war commissioner (died 1823)
- 11 October – Frederick, Hereditary Prince of Denmark (died 1805)

== Deaths ==
- 21 March – Jacob Severin, merchant over Greenland (born 1691)
