= 1749 in Denmark =

- Decades: 1720s; 1730s; 1740s; 1750s; 1760s
- See also: Other events of 1749; List of years in Denmark

Events from the year 1749 in Denmark.

== Incumbents ==
- Monarch — Frederick V
- Prime minister — Johan Ludvig Holstein-Ledreborg

== Events ==
January

- 3 January — The newspaper Berlingske is first published by Ernst Henrich Berling, making it the oldest Danish newspaper still in printing.

May

- 12 May – Frederick V visits Roskilde on his grand tour of Denmark and Norway.

== Births ==
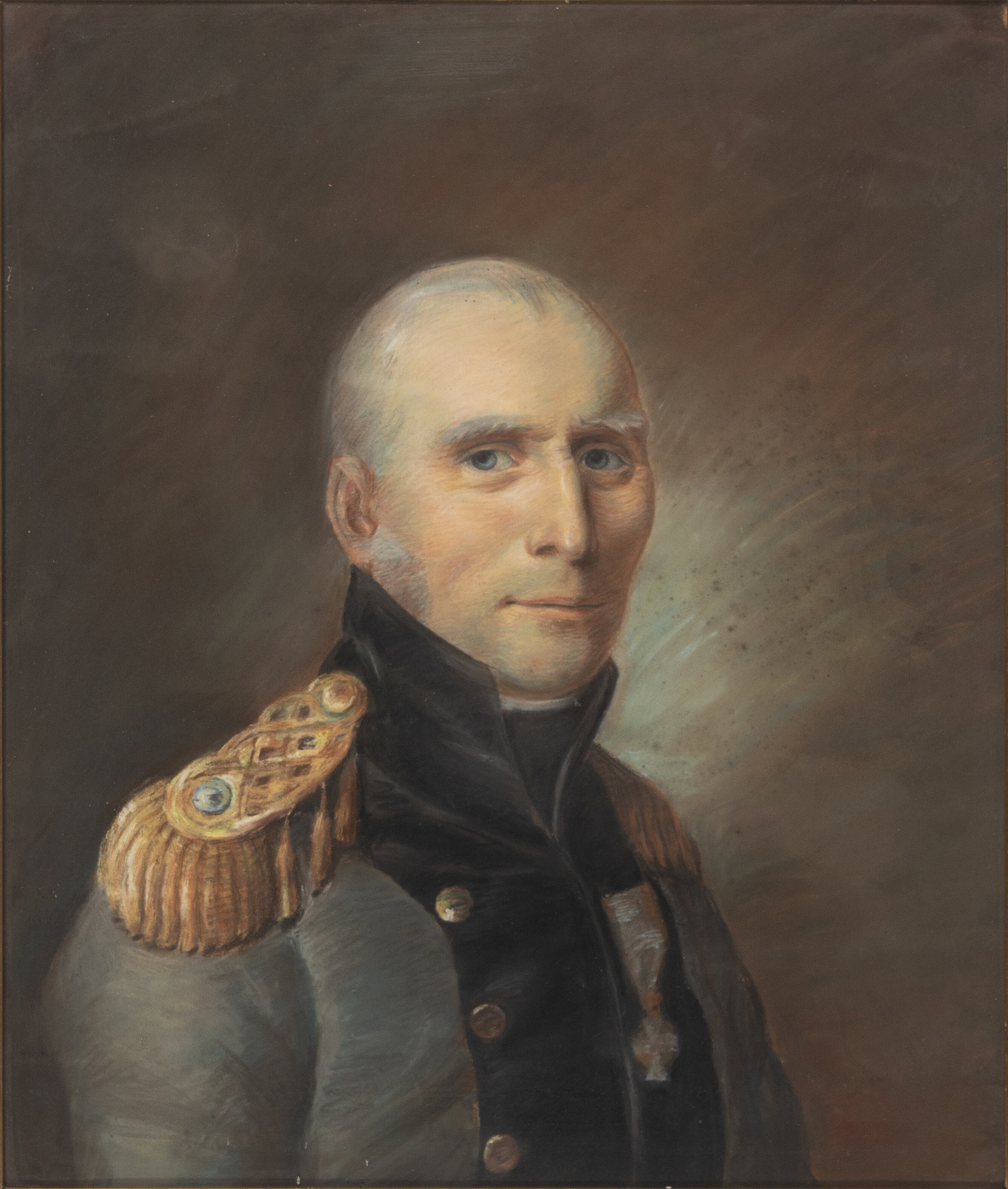
Andreas Kirkerup.

- 29 January — Christian VII, king of Denmark (died 1808)
- 9 June — Andreas Kirkerup, architect (d. 1810)
- 10 August — Christian August Lorentzen, painter (died 1828)
- 28 September – Bertel Bjørnsen, mayor (died 1820)
- November 29 — Johan Frederik Clemens, engraver (died 1831)
