= 1829 in Denmark =

- Decades: 1800s; 1810s; 1820s; 1830s; 1840s
- See also: Other events of 1829; List of years in Denmark

Events from the year 1829 in Denmark.

== Incumbents ==
- Monarch – Frederick VI
- Prime minister – Otto Joachim

== Events ==
=== June ===
- 7 June – C. F. Hansen's new Church of Our Lady in Copenhagen inaugurated after the previous building was destroyed in the British Bombardment of Copenhagen in 1807.

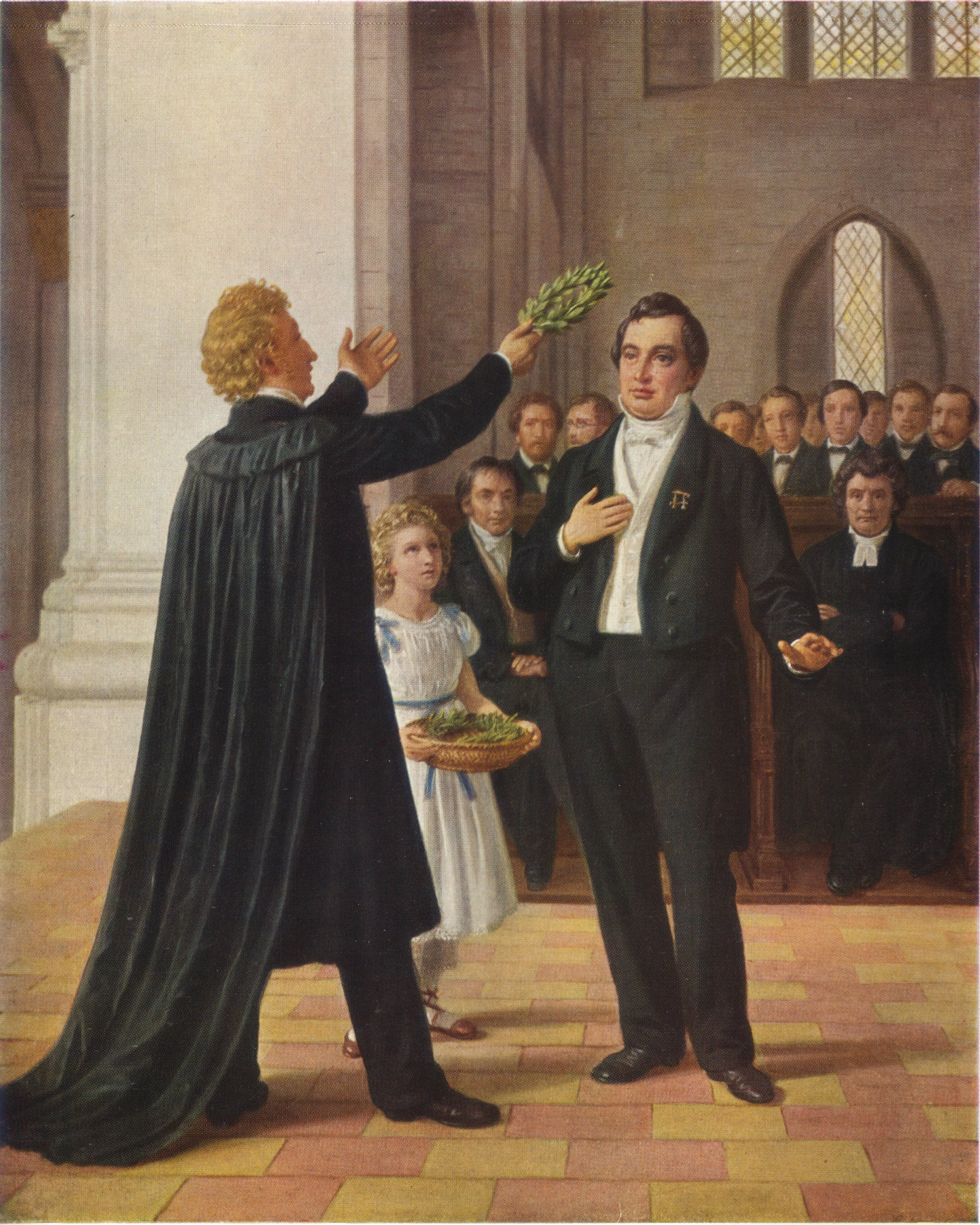
Oehlenschläger and Tegner at Lund Cathedral, painted by Constantin Hansen

- 19 June – Adam Oehlenschläger is publicly crowned with laurel by the Swedish poet Esaias Tegner in front of the high altar in Lund Cathedral, as the "Scandinavian King of Song.". The event cements his position as the leading proponent of Romanticism in the region and at the same time heralds the emergence the Scandinavismmovement.

=== August ===
- 1 August – Prince Ferdinand marries at Frederiksberg Palace his first cousin once removed, Princess Caroline of Denmark (1793–1881), the eldest daughter of the above-mentioned sonless Crown Prince Frederick, now King Frederick VI of Denmark.

=== October ===
- 1 October – Sparekassen for Helsingør og Omegn is established.

=== November ===
- 5 November – The College of Advanced Technology (DTU) is inaugurated with Hans Christian Ørsted, who had also been one of the driving forces behind its establishment, as its first principal.

== Births ==
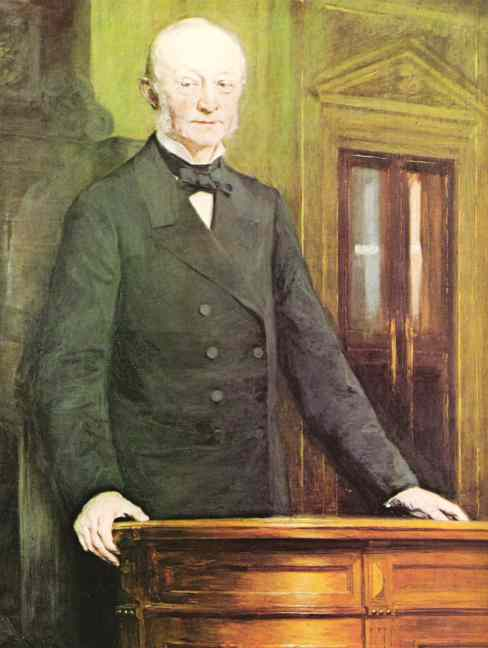
Carl Frederik Rietgen.

=== January–March ===
- 18 January – Ludvig Lorenz, mathematician and physicist (died 1891)
- 7 February – Theobald Stein, sculptor (died 1901)
- 19 March – Carl Frederik Tietgen, financier, businessman (died 1901)

=== July–September ===
- 28 July – Peter Nielsen, botanist (died 1897)
- 22 August — Carl Baagøe, painter (died 1902)

=== October–December ===
- 8 October – Iver Qvistgaard, landowner and mayor (born 1767)
- 16 October – Sophus Berendsen, businessman (died 1884)
- 20 October – Ane Cathrine Andersdatter, murderer, last oerson to be executed in Denmark in times of peace (died 1861)
- 30 November – Thomas Lange, novelist (died 1887)
- 18 December – Christen Berg, politician (died 1891)
- 20 December – Hans Peter Hansen, xylographer (died 1899)

== Deaths ==
=== January–March ===
- 21 January – Kamma Rahbek, salonist and lady of letters (born 1775)
- 6 February – Johan David Vogel, businessman and brewer (born 1759)
- 18 February – Olfert Fischer, vice admiral (born 1747)
- 21 February – Christian Ludvig von Holten, colonial administrator (born 1774)
- 4 March – Grímur Jónsson Thorkelin, scholar, archivist (born 1752)

=== April–June ===
- 28 June – Rasmus Nyerup, literary historian, philologist, folklorist and librarian (born 1759)

=== July–September ===
- 22 September – Jes Bundsen, architecural printmaker (born 1766)

=== October–December ===
- 8 October – Iver Qvistgaard, civil servant, landowner and mayor (born 1767)
- 25 October – Andreas Birch, academic, bishop (born 1758)
