= 1755 in Denmark =

- Decades: 1730s; 1740s; 1750s; 1760s; 1770s
- See also: Other events of 1755; List of years in Denmark

Events from the year 1755 in Denmark.

== Incumbents ==
- Monarch – Frederick V
- Prime minister – Johan Ludvig Holstein-Ledreborg

== Events ==
- 24 November – The company now known as Iver C. Weilbach & Co. A/S is founded when flag, sail and compass maker Iver Jensen Borger sets up his own maritime supplier business in Copenhagen

== Births ==
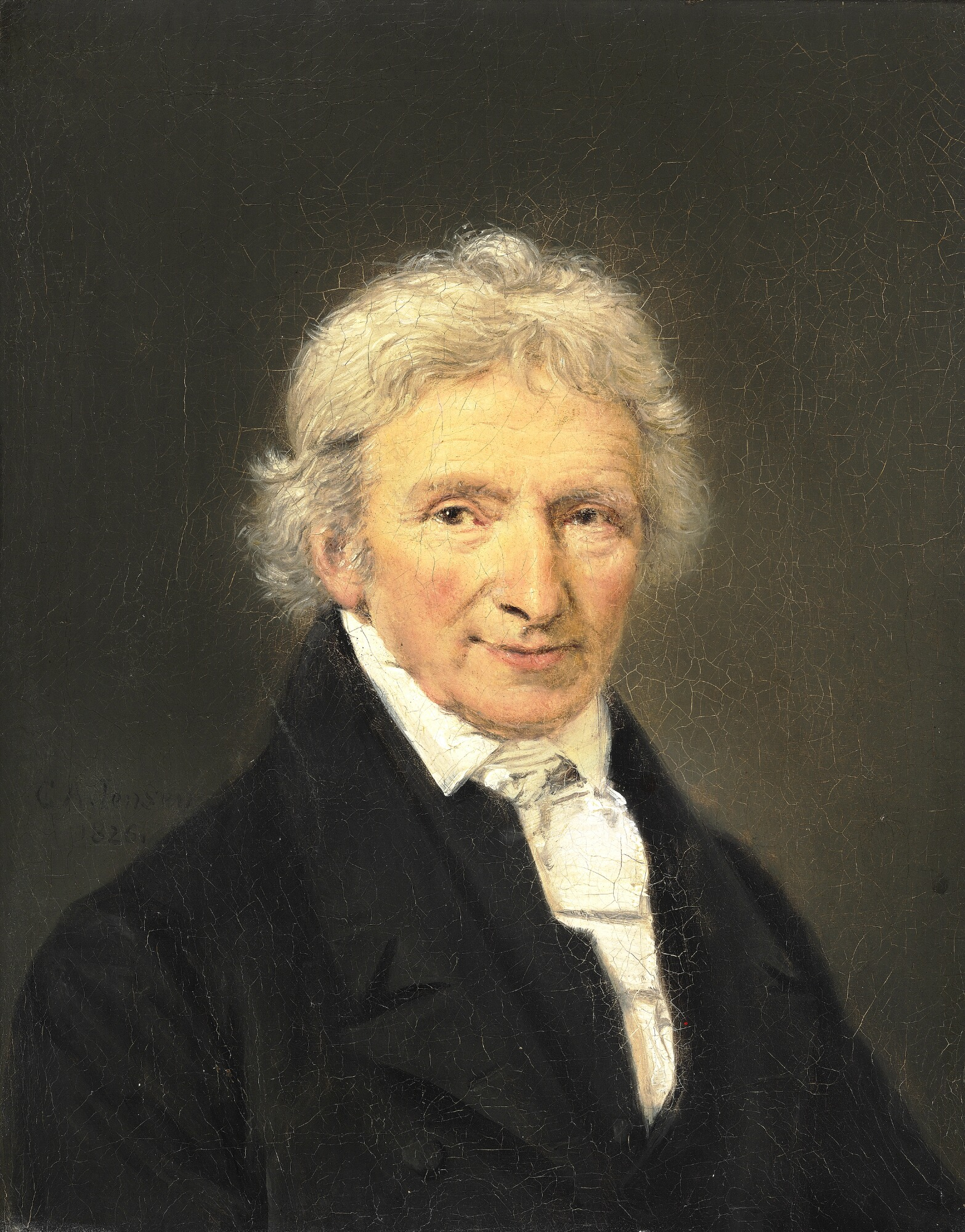
Salomon Ahron Jacobson.

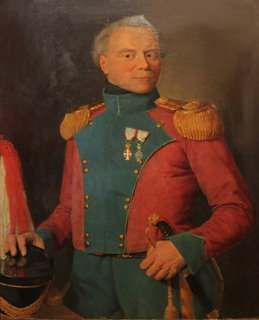
Andreas Hallander.

- 5 February – Caroline Müller, operatic mezzo-soprano, actress and dancer (died 1826)
- 3 March – Cathrine Marie Gielstrup, stage actress (died 1792)
- 1 April – Ernst Frederik Walterstorff, colonial administrator (died 1820 in France)
- 27 June – Niels Ditlev Riegels, historian, journalist and pamphleteer (died 1802)
- 19 September – David Amsel Meyer, businessman and financial advisor (died 1813)
- 17 October - Envold de Falsen, lawyer, poet, actor and statesman (died 1808).
- 13 November – Andreas Hallander, builder and architect (died 1828)
- 16 November – Joachim-Daniel Preisler, actor (died 1809)

=== Full date missing ===
- August – Salomon Ahron Jacobson, medallist, sculptor, engraver (died 1830)

== Deaths ==
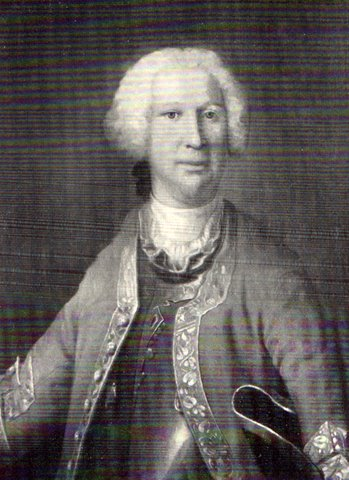
Frederik Fabritius.

- 2 January – Michael Christian Ludvig Ferdinand Tønder, naval officer (born 1692 in Norway)
- 5 February – Gideon von der Lühe, county governor (born 1704)
- 12 February – Frederik Fabritius, goldsmith (born 1683)
- 28 February – Johannes Erasmus Iversen, composer (born 1713)
- 2 April – Christian Siegfried Scheel von Plessen, army officer, county governor and landowner (born 1716)
- 21 September – Johan Cornelius Krieger, architect (born 1683)
