= 1751 in Denmark =

- Decades: 1730s; 1740s; 1750s; 1760s; 1770s
- See also: Other events of 1751; List of years in Denmark

Events from the year 1751 in Denmark.

== Incumbents ==
- Monarch – Frederick V
- Prime minister – Johan Ludvig Holstein-Ledreborg

== Events ==
Undated

- The Lapp Codicil of 1751 is signed, defining the land border between Denmark-Norway and Sweden.
- Construction of Zinn House and Prince William Mansion is completed in Copenhagen.

== Births ==
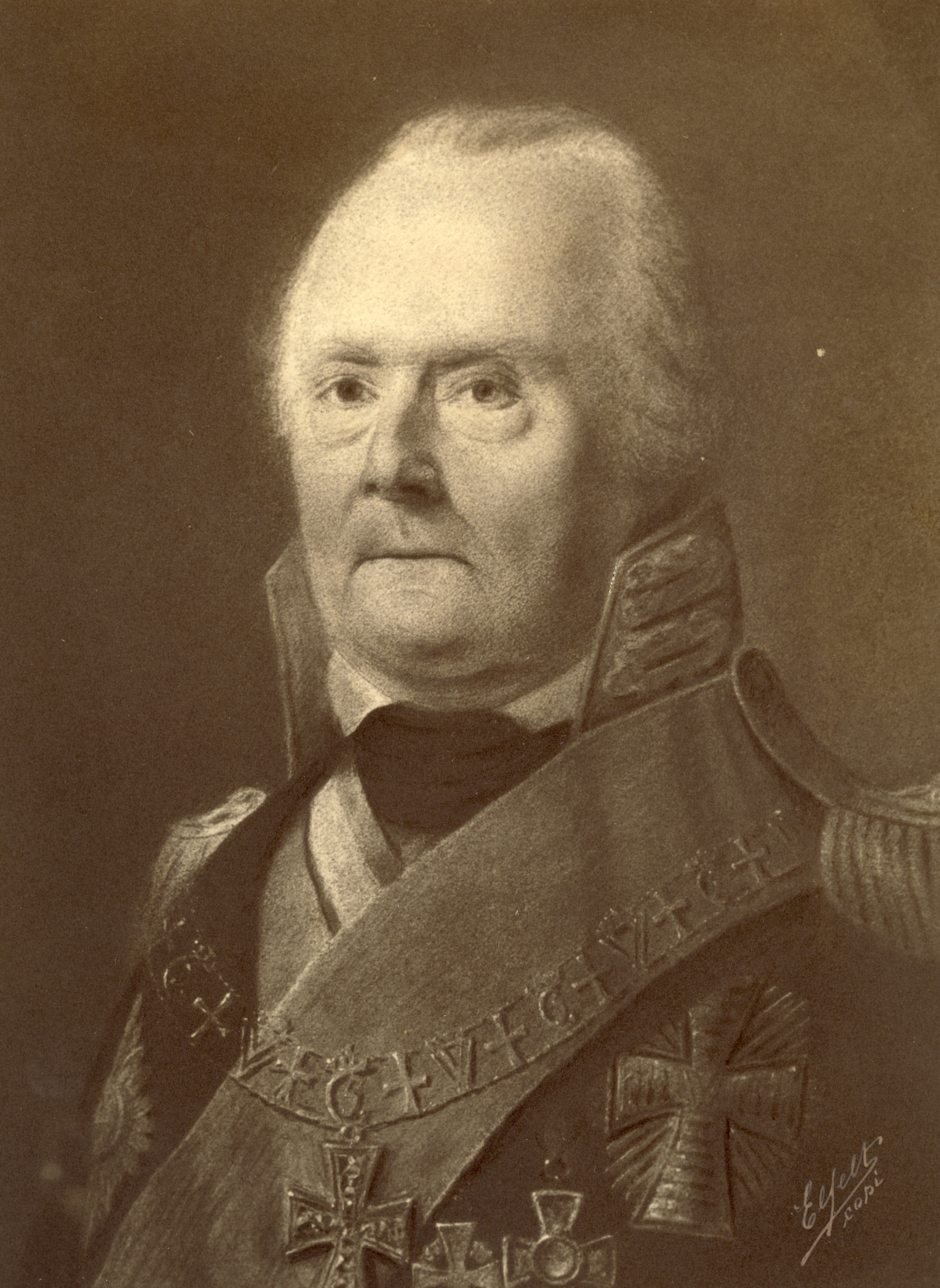
Poul de Løvenørn.

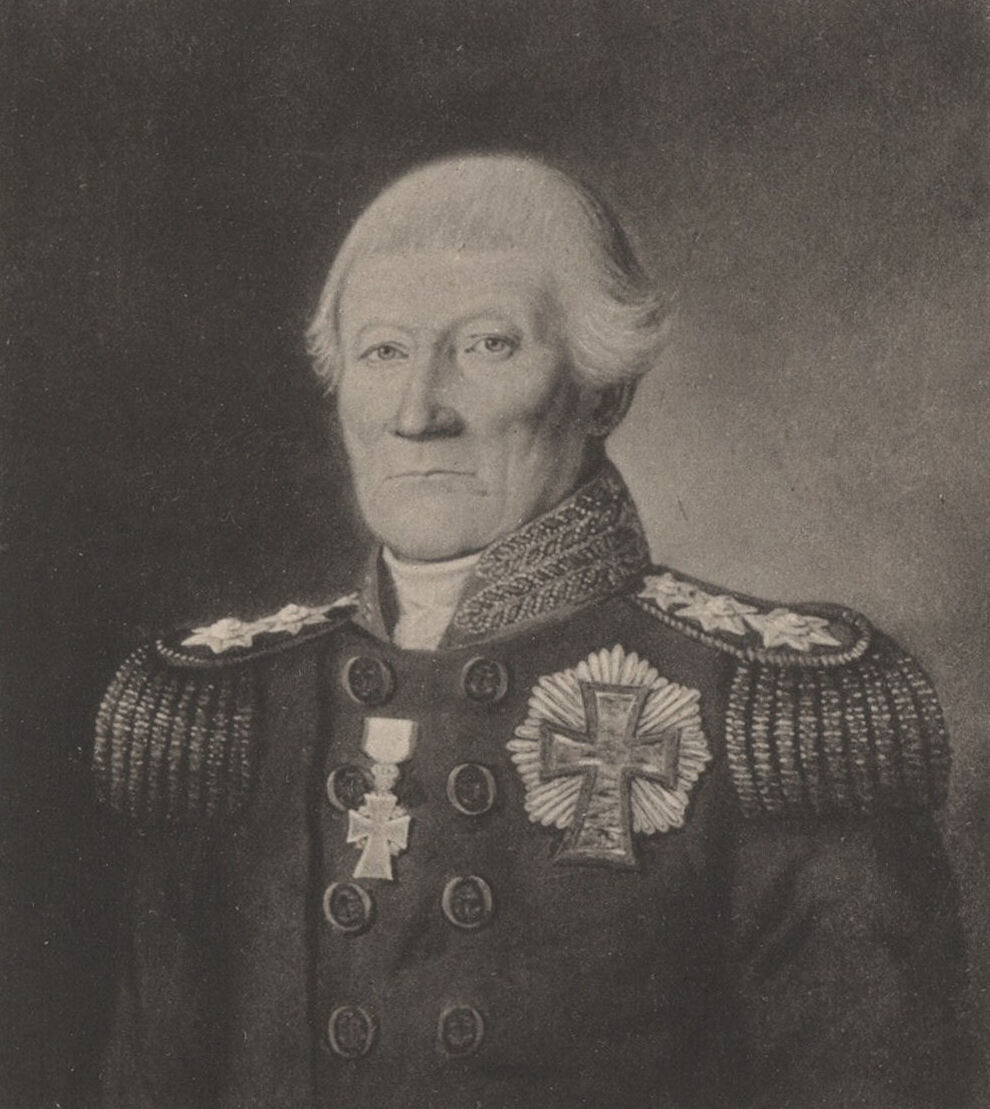
Steen Andersen Bille.

- 11 August –Poul de Løvenørn, naval officer (died 1826)
- 29 JJuly– Johan Bülow, court official and landowner (died 1828)
- 22 August – Steen Andersen Bille, admiral (died 1833)
- 31 August – Hinrich Braren, sea captain and author (died 1826)
- 15 October – Michael Herman Løvenskiold, district governor and landowner (died 1807)

=== Full date missing ===
- Birgitte Winther, opera singer (died 1809)
- Peter Rabe Holm, businessman (died 1824)
- Hans Rudolph Saabye, businessman (died 1817)
- Hans Christian Ondrup, master builder, stucco artist and porcelain painter (died 1814)

== Deaths ==
- 6 January – Carl Marcus Tuscher, polymath: portrait painter, printmaker, architect, and decorator (born 1705 in the Holy Roman Empire)
- 7 June – Peter Otto Rosenørn, county governor and disrist (born 1708)
- 19 December – Queen Louise, Queen of Denmark-Norway (born 1724 in the United Kingdom)
