= 1752 in Denmark =

- Decades: 1730s; 1740s; 1750s; 1760s; 1770s
- See also: Other events of 1752; List of years in Denmark

Events from the year 1752 in Denmark.

== Incumbents ==
- Monarch – Frederick V
- Prime minister – Johan Ludvig Holstein-Ledreborg

== Events ==
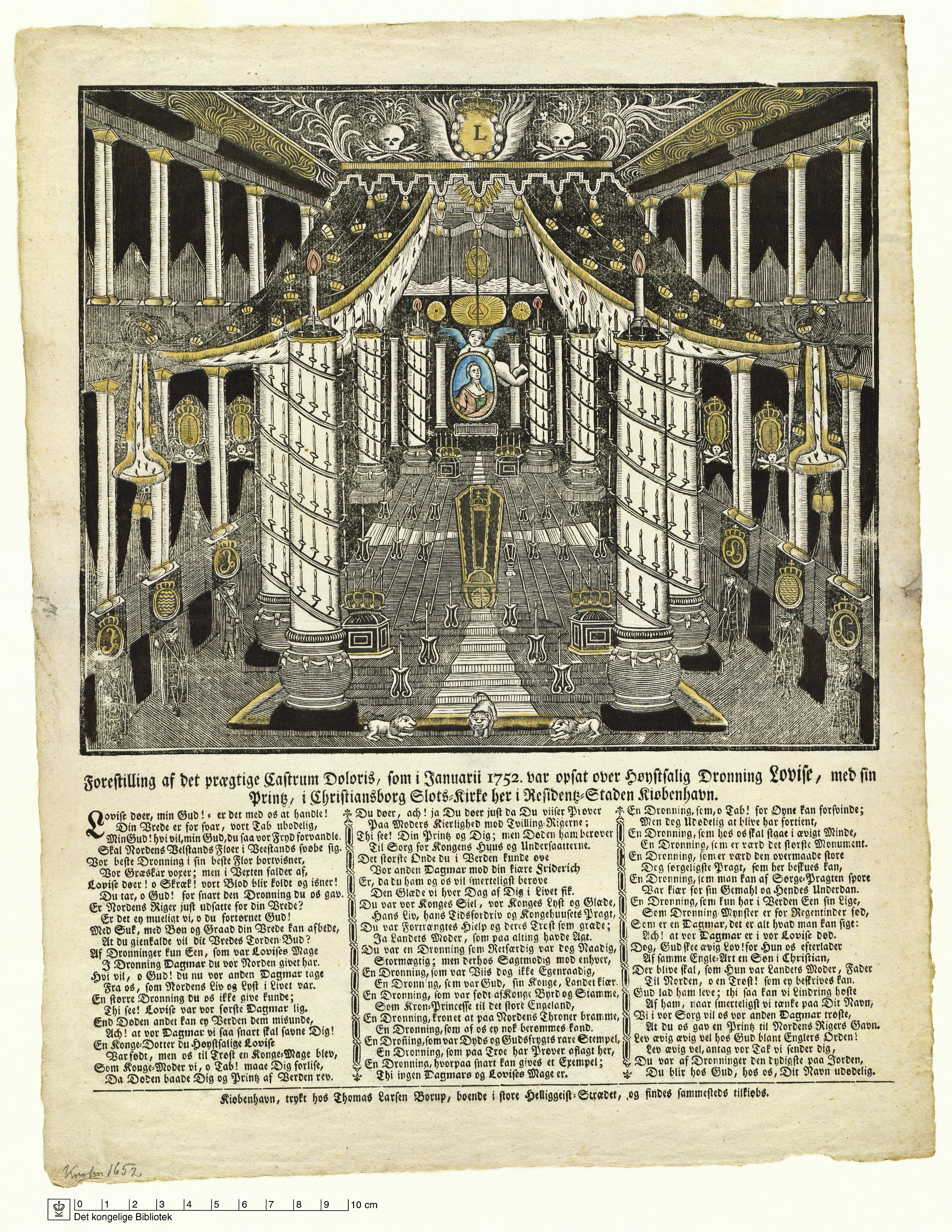
January: Castrum dolris of Queen Louise in Christiansborg Chapel.

- January – The castrum doloris of Louise in Christiansborg Chapel.
- 8 July – The wedding of Frederick V and Juliana Maria of Brunswick-Wolfenbüttel.

== Births ==
- 4 February – Johan Martin Schønheyder, Supreme Court attorney (died 1831)
- 12 March – Frederik Christian Winsløw, medal engraver (died 1811)
- 31 March – Erich Erichsen, merchant and ship-owner (died (1837)
- 6 October – Jens Friedenreich Hage, merchant and landowner (died 1831)
- 8 October – Grímur Jónsson Thorkelin, scholar, archivist (died 1829)
- 17 December – Severin Kierulf, Danish India-based businessman (died 1834)

== Deaths ==
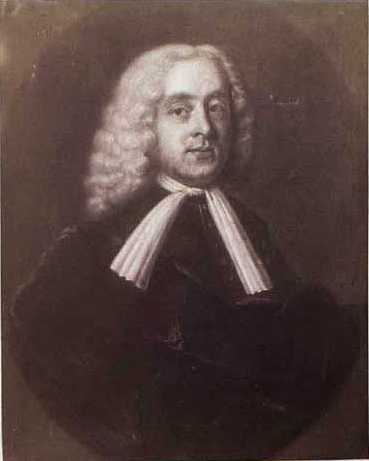
Christian Falster.

- 30 August – Christian Ludvig von Plessen, statesman and landowner (born 1676 in Mecjkenburg)
- 12 September – Gregorius Klauman, businessman and judge (born 1678)
- 24 October – Christian Falster, poet and philologist (born 1690)
