= Øregård Museum =

Art museum in Hellerup, Denmark

Coordinates: 55°44′20″N 12°34′22″E

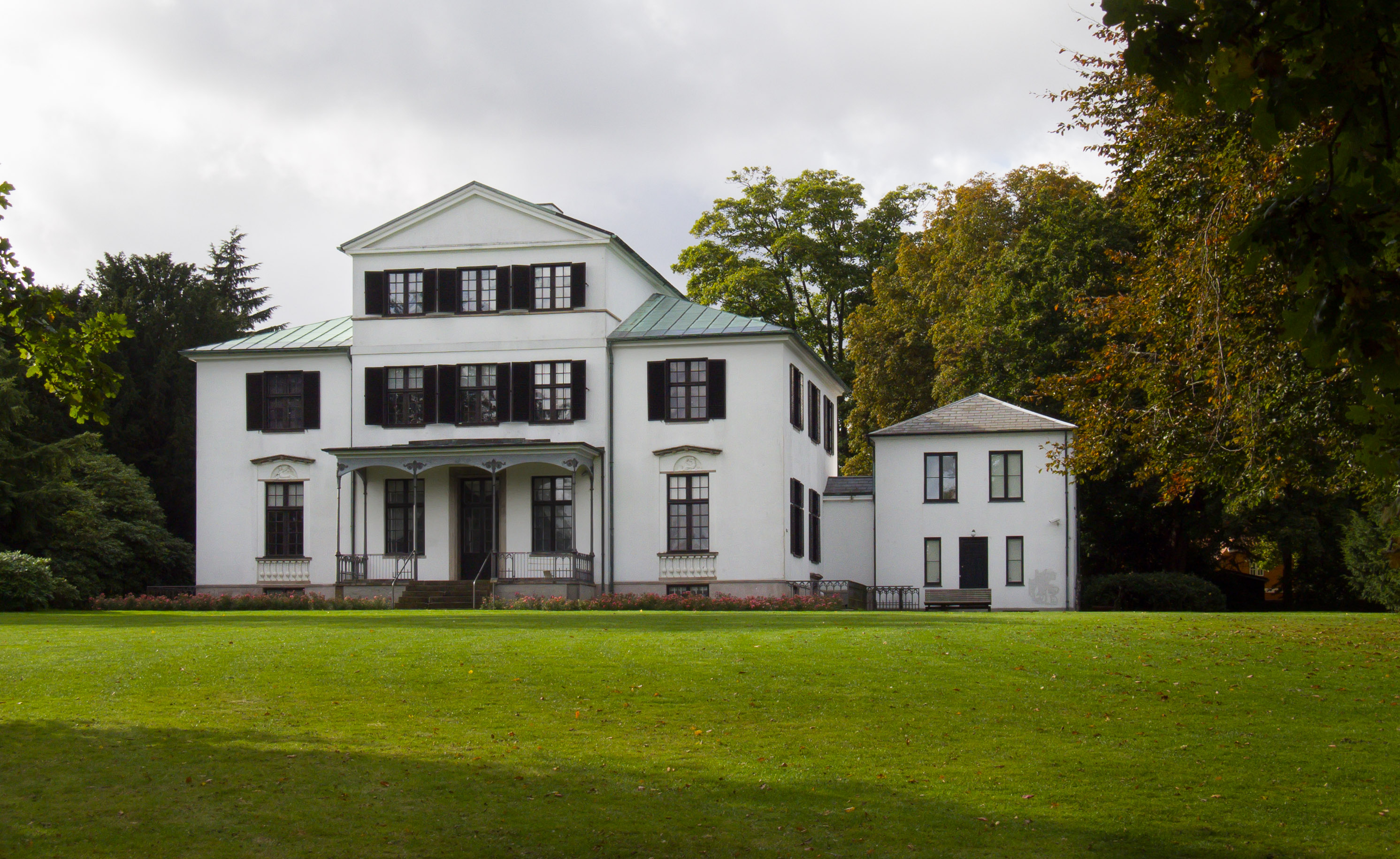
- Øregård, seen from the garden
- Interactive map of the Øregård Museum area

General information
- Architectural style: Neoclassicism
- Location: Hellerup, Denmark
- Construction started: 1806
- Completed: 1808
- Client: Johannes Søbøtker

Design and construction
- Architect: Joseph-Jacques Ramée

Øregård Museum is an art museum located in Hellerup in the northern outskirts of Copenhagen, Denmark. It is owned by Gentofte Municipality and holds a topographic collection of pictures from Copenhagen and the area north of the city. It also hosts special exhibitions. The building is a former country house built by merchant and planter Johannes Søbøtker, who was active in the triangular trade and the Atlantic slave trade in the Danish West Indies.

== History and architecture ==
Øregård is a former country house built by Danish merchant, planter and shipping agent Johannes Søbøtker, who was a partner in one of Denmark's largest trading companies and made a fortune in slave plantations, shipping and the triangular trade between Denmark, the Danish Gold Coast and the Danish West Indies.

Like many of his contemporaries in trade and shipping, Søbøtker became a very wealthy member of an emerging bourgeoisie which was becoming a major force in the 19th century and was acquiring the habits that had previously been reserved for the aristocracy. Over recent decades, it had become common for people to build stately summer residences north of the city while spending winters in town mansions in Copenhagen. In 1806, Søbøtker acquired a farm, Øregaard, in Hellerup and commissioned the French architect Joseph-Jacques Ramée to build a suitable country house on the property. Ramée was at that time working out of Hamburg but designed a number of similar houses in the same area for other wealthy families, including Sophienholm for Constantin Brun and Hellerupgård.

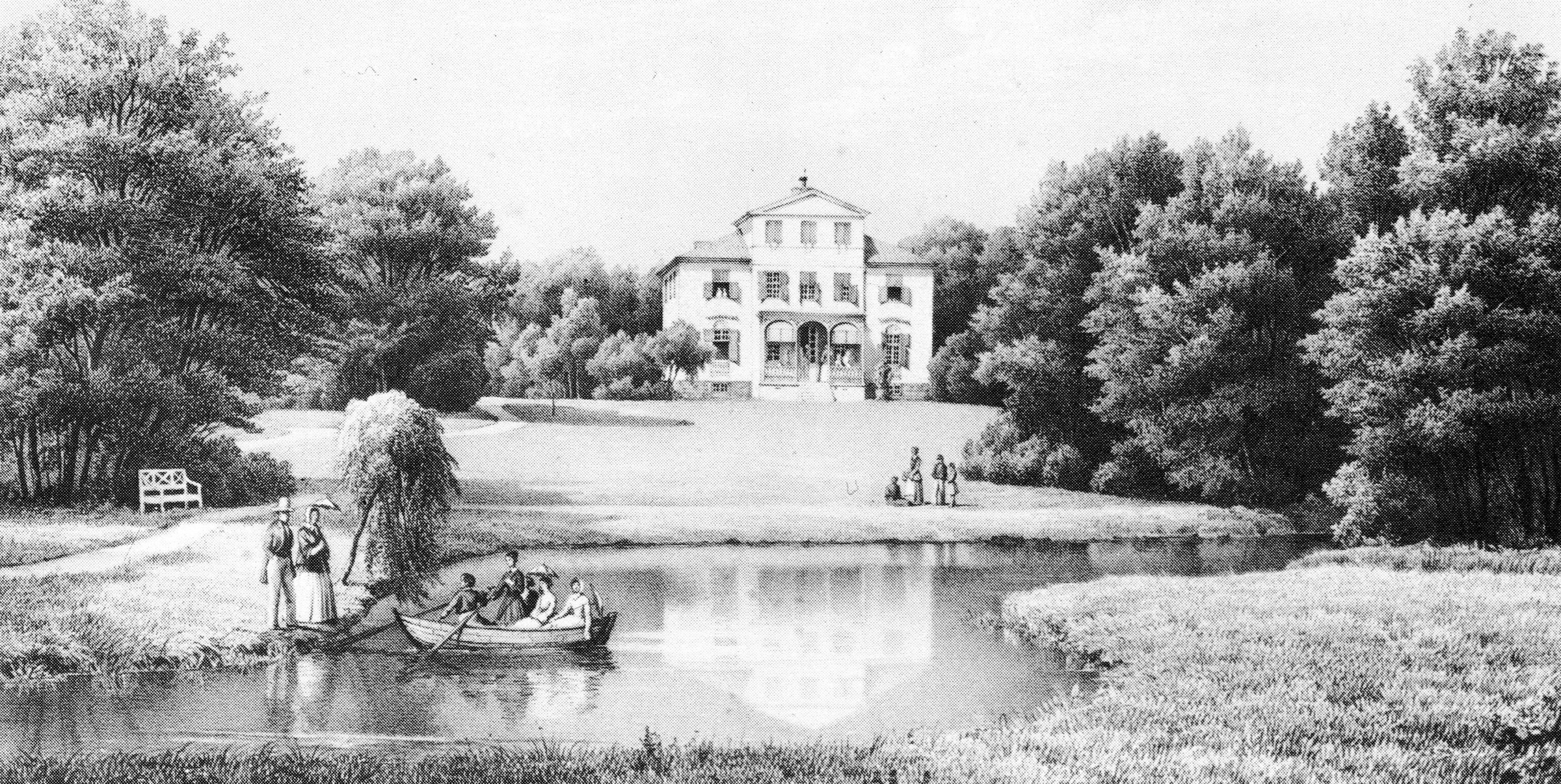
Øregaard

The resulting building was a simple, white-washed Neoclassical building, typical of Ramée's work around that time. He also designed the surrounding park which was laid out in English style as a Romantic landscape garden with an artificial lake and grotto.

Søbøtker maintained an extravagant lifestyle and in the same time the meagre times which followed the English Wars and the national bankruptcy in 1813 hit his business enterprises hard. In 1821 he had to sell Øregård, and moved to the Danish West Indies where he settled on his estate on Saint Croix and later became governor of Saint John and Saint Thomas.

Øregård came under new ownership and was converted into a museum. It was ultimately acquired by Gentofte Municipality in 1917 and converted into a museum. The park was carefully renovated by Gudmund Nyeland Brandt, municipal gardener and later parks director in Gentofte from 1914 to 1841, and was converted into a public park.

== Collections and exhibitions ==
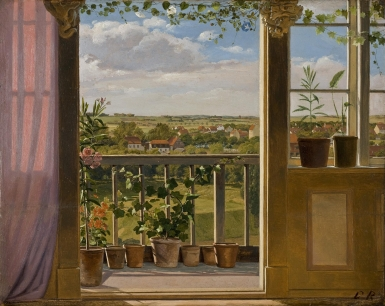
Martinus Rørbye, View from Nørrevold towards Bellahøj, c. 1830 – showing the area where the Nørrebro district lies today

Øregård Museum holds a large topographic collection of around 3,000 pictures—oil paintings, watercolours, engravings and drawings—which depict Copenhagen and the area of the city. The collection covers the period from 1750 to 1930 and contains works by both famous and not-so-famous artists. A large part of the collection came from the private collection of Jacob Hegel (1851–1918). He was managing director of Gyldendal, Denmark's largest publishing house, and a passionate art collector. After his death, his widow, Julie Hoel, bequeathed most of the collection to Gentofte Municipality. They moved it to Øregård which opened to the public in 1921.

The museum also hosts two to three special exhibitions a year and arranges a variety of events. The special exhibitions cover both older and more modern art. There is a special tradition for presenting retrospective exhibitions with artists who were underrated, or experienced adversity, in their own day. Examples have been Elisabeth Jerichau-Baumann, Bertha Wegmann, Marie Krøyer, Hugo Larsen, Paul Fischer and Vilhelm Hammershøi. Other exhibitions relate to the history of the building, including the Danish West Indies, or to the surrounding area.

== List of owners ==
- 1806-1821: Johannes Søbøtker
- 1821-1833: Johan Jørgen Hunæus
- 1833-1843: Joseph Hambro
- 1843-1873: Andreas Nicolai Hansen
- 1873-1893: Alfred Hansen
- 1893-1917: Detlef Ohlsen
- 1917: Gentofte Municipality

== See also ==
- List of museums in and around Copenhagen
