= 1754 in Denmark =

- Decades: 1730s; 1740s; 1750s; 1760s; 1770s
- See also: Other events of 1754; List of years in Denmark

Events from the year 1754 in Denmark.

== Incumbents ==
- Monarch – Frederick V
- Prime minister – Johan Ludvig Holstein-Ledreborg

== Events ==
- March 31 – The Royal Danish Academy of Fine Arts is founded as a gift to King Frederick V on his 31st birthday.

=== Undated ===
- Saint Thomas, Saint John and Saint Croix were sold to king Frederick V, becoming royal Danish-Norwegian colonies.

== Births ==
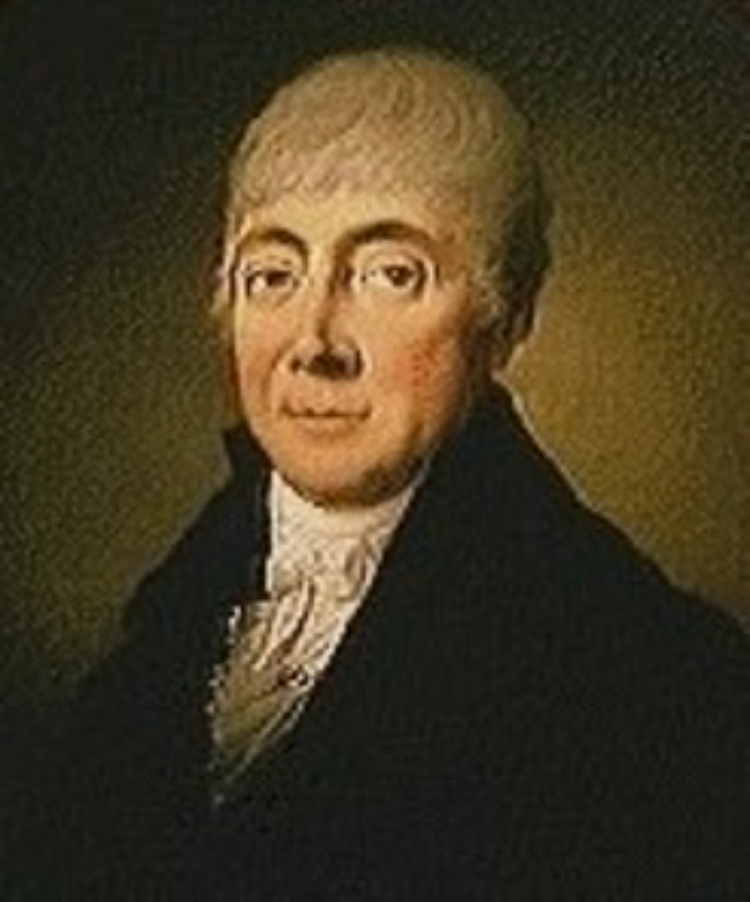
Hartvig Marcus Frisch.

- 12 April – Laurids Smith, clergyman, philosopher and early animal rights writer (died 1794)
- 10 May – Asmus Jacob Carstens, painter (died 1798)
- 3 June – Jacob Gude, government official and memoirist (died 1810)
- 7 September – Hartvig Marcus Frisch, civil servant (died 1816)
- 19 December – Hans Haagen, chief of police (died 1845)

== Deaths ==
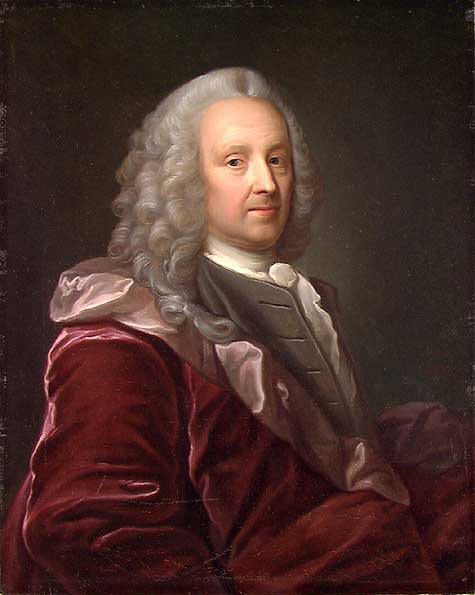
[Ludvig Holberg[].

- 28 January – Ludvig Holberg, author, playwright, academic (born 1684)
- 5 February – Caroline Thielo, actress (born (1735 in Denmark|1735)
- 7 June – Nicolai Eigtved, architect (born 1701)
- 25 August – Frederik Hauch, Postmaster-General (died 1839)
- 18 September – Ferdinand Anton Danneskiold-Laurvig, Count (b 1688)
