= 1756 in Denmark =

- Decades: 1730s; 1740s; 1750s; 1760s; 1770s
- See also: Other events of 1756; List of years in Denmark

Events from the year 1756 in Denmark.

== Incumbents ==
- Monarch – Frederick V
- Prime minister – Johan Ludvig Holstein-Ledreborg

== Events ==
- 14 October – An Agreement of Friendship and Trade between Denmark-Norway and the Ottoman Empire is signed by King Frederick V and Sultan Osman III.

== Births ==
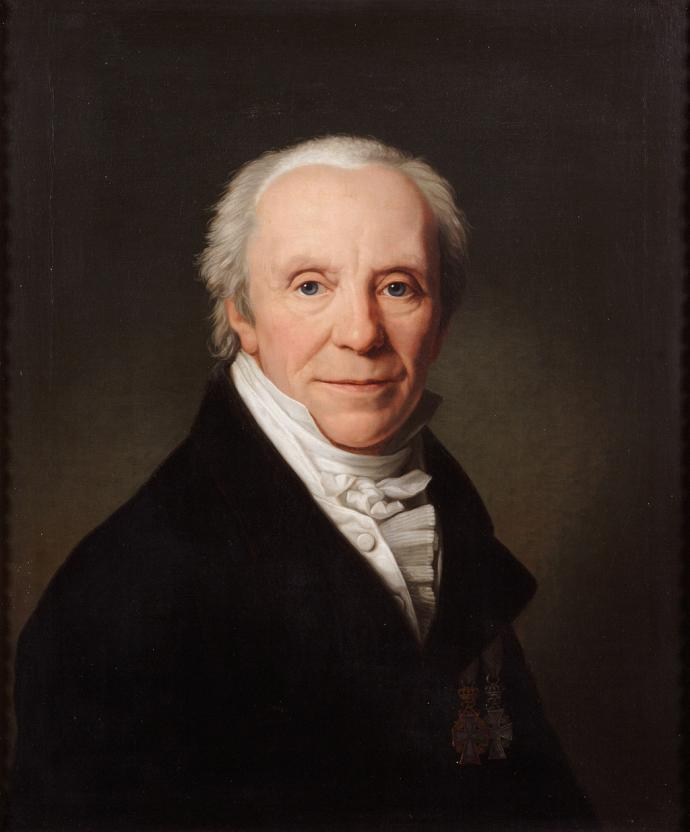
Christian Frederik Hansen.

- 9 February – Friderich Christian Hager, governor of the Danish Gold Coast (died 1795)
- 29 February – Christian Frederik Hansen, architect (died 1845)
- 1 March – Johan Frederik Schultz, printer and publisher (died 1817)
- 7 July – Johan Cornelius Krieger, naval officer (died 1824)
- 21 August – Michael Gottlieb Birckner, priest and philosopher (died 1798)
- 17 October – Isaac Abraham Euchel, author and founder of the "Haskalah movement" (died 1804)
- 26 November – Christian Jacob Theophilus de Meza, physician (died 1844)

Full date missing

- Hans Wassard, businessman and landowner (died 1839)
- Paul Erdmann Isert, surgeon, planter and letter writer (died 1790)

== Deaths ==
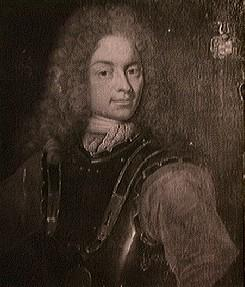
Michael Bille.

- 2 May – Michael Bille, admiral (born 1680)
- 6 May – Caspar Martin Schøller, county governor (born 1681)
- 25 June – Carl Gottlieb von Reitzenstein , German military officer in Danish service (born 1684 in Germany)
- 12 August – Christiane Henriette Louise Juel, noblewoman and courtier (born 1706)
- , 16 October – Ulrik Christian Nissen, government official (born 1691)
