= Hogensborg, U.S. Virgin Islands =

Coordinates: 17°42′34″N 64°50′49″W

Hogensborg, United States Virgin Islands
- Village
- Interactive map of Hogensborg, United States Virgin Islands
- Country: United States Virgin Islands
- Island: Saint Croix
- Time zone: UTC-4 (AST)

Hogensborg is a settlement on the island of Saint Croix in the United States Virgin Islands.

== History ==
=== Søbøtker family ===
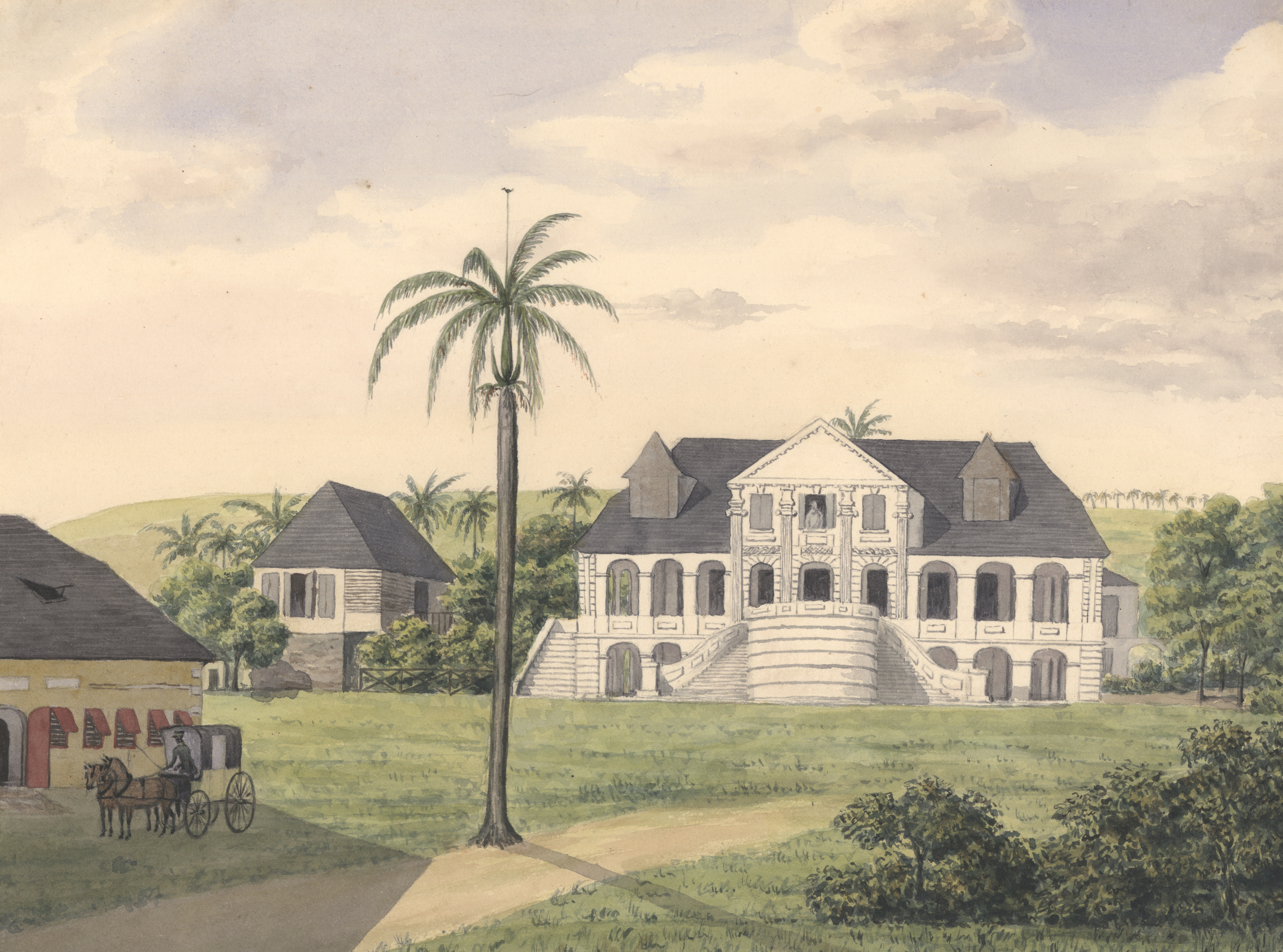
Høgensborg, the Søbøtkers' home on St. Croix

Høgensborg was originally the name of an estate owned by the Søbøtker family. General War Commissioner Adam Levin Søbøtker was for a while the largest landowner in the Danish West Indies. his son, Johannes Søbøtker, inherited Hogensborg and Constitution Hill after his father in 1823. He introduced the first steam mill in the Danish West Indies on the plantation. He succeeded Peter von Scholten as governor of Saint Thomas and St. John in 1835.

As of 1816, Hogensborg & Sorgenfrie (Princes Quarter No. 25 and Westend Quarter No. 17, Centre Police District, Frederiksteds Jurisdiction) had a combined area of 300 acres, of which 125 acres were planted with sugar cane and 175 acres were under other cultivation. 186 enslaved labourers were present on the estate.

On 23 February 1823, in accordance with General War Commissioner A. Søbøtker's testament, the use of the property was reserved to Chamberliin J. Søbøtker, but the right of title went to Chamberlain J. Søbøtker's children. On 9 December 1858, Hogensborg was sold at auction to Alexander Fleming for $27,000.
