= 1828 in Denmark =

- Decades: 1800s; 1810s; 1820s; 1830s; 1840s
- See also: Other events of 1828; List of years in Denmark

Events from the year 1828 in Denmark.

== Incumbents ==
- Monarch – Frederick VI
- Prime minister – Otto Joachim

== Events ==
March

- 31 March – HDMS hvalfisken sets out from Copenhagen, marking the beginning of the 1828–1831 Danish East Greenland Expedition.

August

- 2 August – Rønne-based newspaper Bornholms kongelig allernaadigst ene privilegeret Avertissements-Tidende is published for the first time.

November

- 1 November – The wedding of Prince Frederick (VII) and Princess Vilhelmine Marie of Denmark takjes place in Copenhagen.

== Births ==
=== January–March ===
- 2 January Adolf Delcomyn, businessman and consul-general in London (died 1813 in the United Kingdom)
- 21 February – Oswald Sickert, artist (died 1885)

=== April–June ===
- 2 May – Jacob Heinrich Moresco, businessman (died 1906)

=== July–September ===
- 27 September – Georgia Schouw-Skovgaard, embroiderer (died 1868)

=== October–December ===
- 8 November – Johannes Helms, writer and schoolmaster (died 1895)
- 30 November – Carl Simonsen, printmaker (died 1902)

== Deaths ==
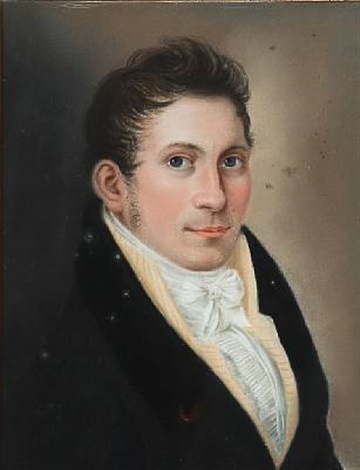
Hans Hansen.

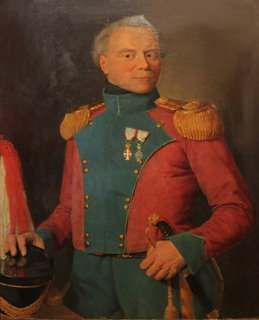
Andreas Hallander.

=== January–March ===
- 12 January – Peter Mandrup Lem, violinist (born 1758)
- 22 January – Johan Bülow, court official and landowner (born 1751)
- 11 February – Hans Hansen, portrait painter (born 1769)

=== April–June ===
- 3 April – Andreas Hallander, architect and master builder (born 1755)
- 8 May – Christian August Lorentzen, painter (born 1749)
- 19 June – Søren Læssøe Lange, painter and illustrator (born 1750)
