= 1750 in Denmark =

- Decades: 1730s; 1740s; 1750s; 1760s; 1770s
- See also: Other events of 1750; List of years in Denmark

Events from the year 1750 in Denmark.

== Incumbents ==
- Monarch – Frederick V
- Prime minister – Johan Ludvig Holstein-Ledreborg

== Events ==
- 31 March – The County of Bregentved is established by Adam Gottlob Moltke from the manors of Bregentved, Turebyholm, Juellinge, Alslevgård, Tryggevælde and Sophiendal.

== Births ==
- 20 January – Princess Louise of Denmark (died 1831)

== Deaths ==
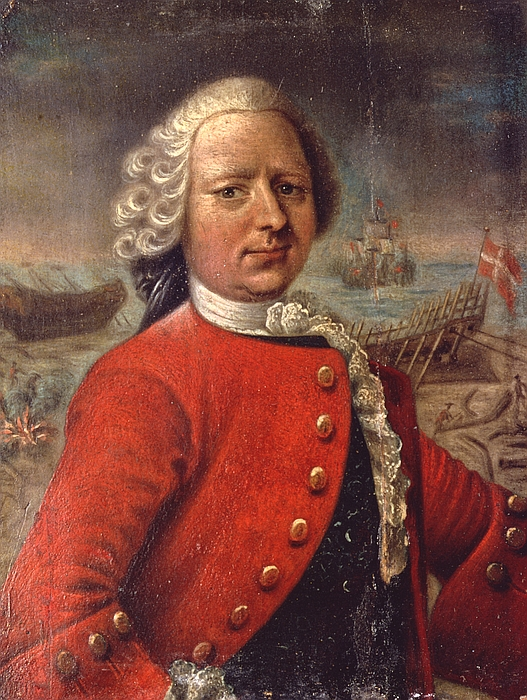
Andreas Bjørn.

- 27 January – Andreas Bjørn, shipbuilder and merchant (born 1703)
- 24 July – Conrad Ditlev Reventlow, diocesan governor, landowner (born 1704 in Hesse)
- 2 August – Christian Berregaard, Supreme Court justice, government official and landowner (born 1683)
- 23 September – Johan Conrad Ernst, architect (born 1666)
- 15 October – Frederik Christian Eilschov, philosopher (born 1725)
- 16 October – Ernst Henrich Berling, printer and publisher, founder of Berlingske (born 1708)
