= Johannes Søbøtker =

Danish merchant (1777 – 1854)

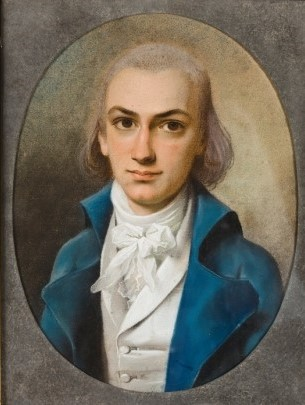
- Portrait by Jens Juel, 1796

Governor of St. Thomas, St. John
- In office 1826–1829
- Monarch: Frederick VI
- Preceded by: Peter von Scholten
- Succeeded by: Frederik Ludvig Christian Pentz Rosenørndk

Governor of St. Thomas, St. John
- In office 1836–1848
- Monarchs: Frederick VI /until December 1839), Christian VIII
- Preceded by: Frederik von Oxholm
- Succeeded by: Hans Hendrik Berg

Personal details
- Born: 9 May 1777 St. Croix, Danish West Indies
- Died: 23 March 1854 (aged 76) Frederiksberg, Denmark
- Spouse: Johanne Margrethe Larsen (m. 1796)
- Parent(s): Adam Levin Søbøtker; Susanne van Beverhoudt
- Awards: Commanders First Class of the Order of the Dannebrog

Johannes Søbøtker (9 May 1777 – 23 March 1854) was a Danish merchant, planter and colonial administrator who served as Governor of St. Thomas and St. John in the Danish West Indies. His former country house Øregård in Hellerup now serves as an art museum.

== Early life and education ==
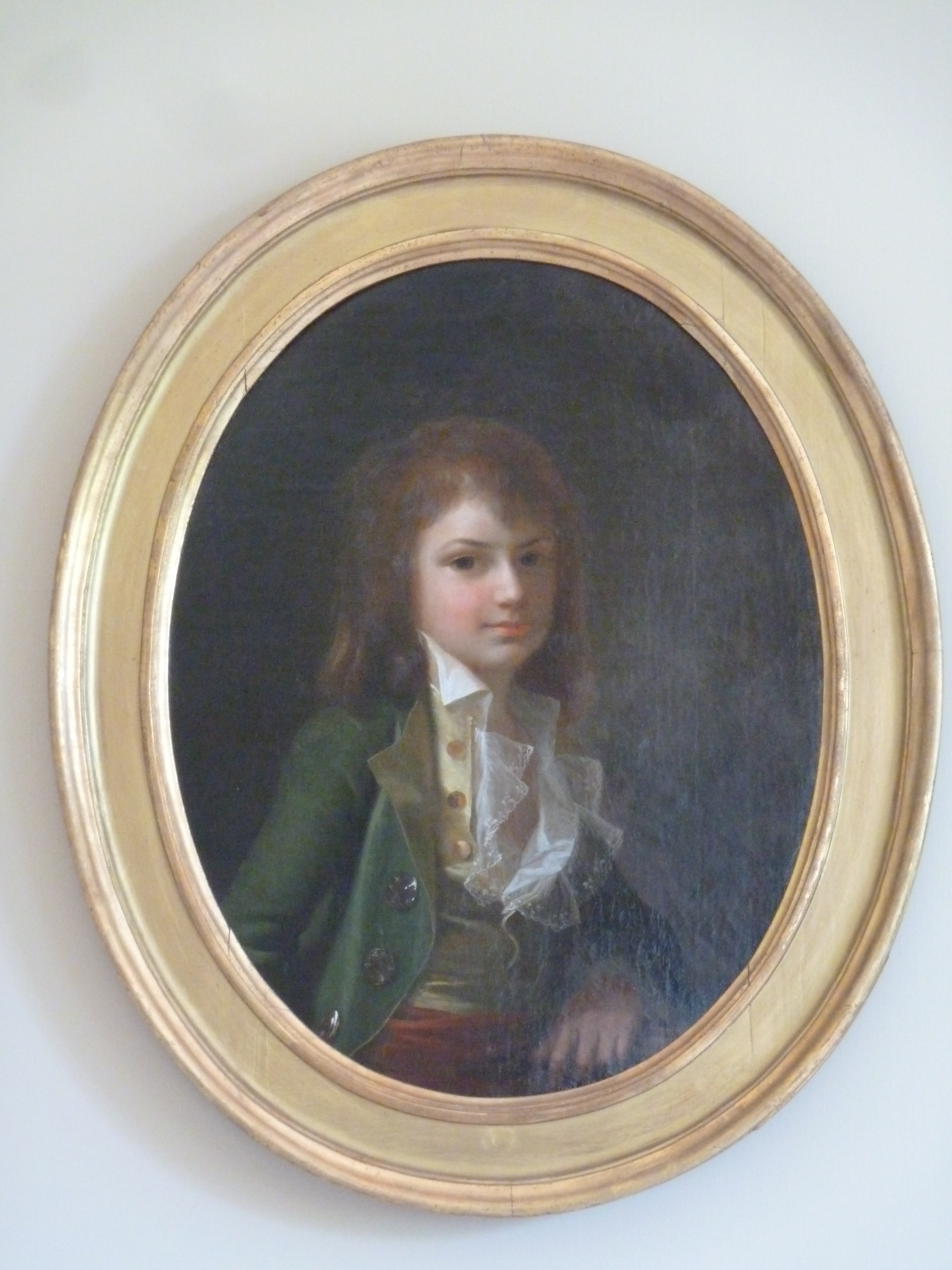
Søbøtker painted by Jens Juel in 1788

Johannes Søbøtker was born on St. Croix in the Danish West Indies, the son of planter and later General War Commissioner Adam Levin Søbøtker (1753–1823) and Susanne van Beverhoudt (1761–1811). His father owned the estates Constitution Hill and Høgensborg on Saint Croix and was for a while the largest landowner on the islands. Søbøtker was sent to Copenhagen where he received a commercial education first in De Coninck & Co. and later his future father-in-law Lars Larsen's trading house.

== Career in Copenhagen and the Danish West Indies ==
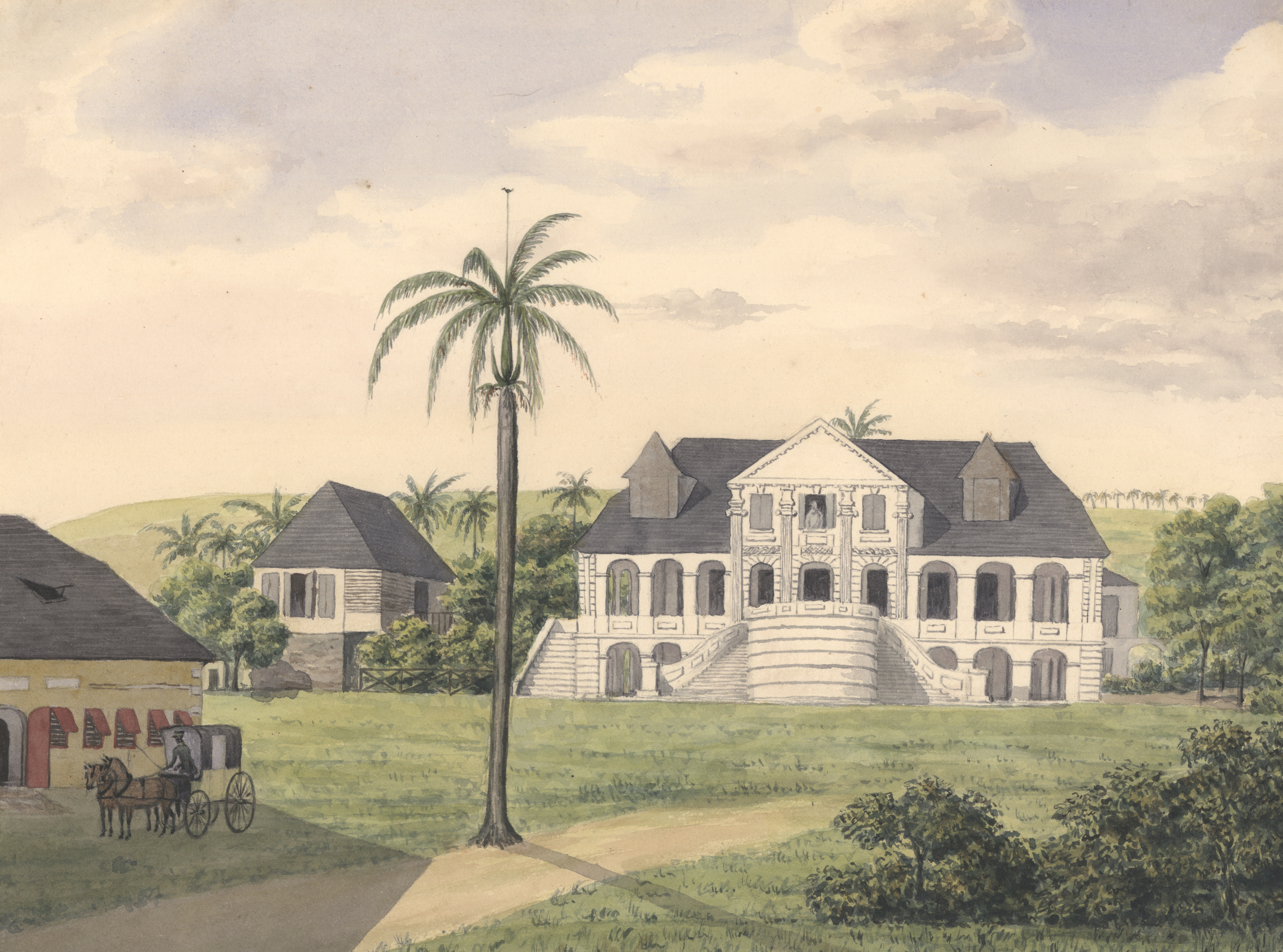
Høgensborg, the Søbøtkers' home on St. Croix

He was granted citizenship as a merchant and began trading on the Danish West Indies with his own fleet of merchant ships under the name Søbøtker & Co.. In 1804, Søbøtker became a partner in Vilhelm Duntzfelt's trading house, Duntzfelt & Co.

He moved to the Danish West Indies and in 1821, he sold the house in Hellerup. When his father died in 1823 on St. Croix, he inherited the plantations, Constitution Hill and Høgensborg. In 1835, when Peter von Scholten was appointed to Governor General, he took over the position as governor of St. Thomas. He introduced the first steam mill in the Danish West Indies on his plantation Høgensborg.

== Personal life and legacy ==
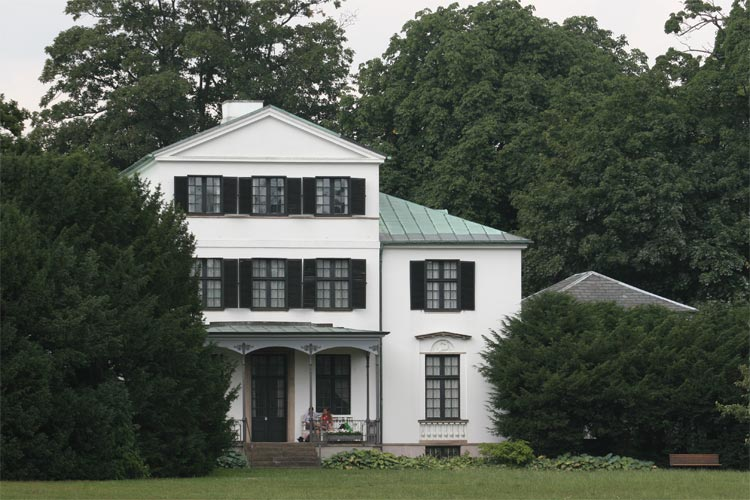
Øregård today

Søbøtker married on 2 March 1796 to Johanne Margrethe Larsen, daughter of timber merchant Lars Larsen. The couple had four children.

Søbøtker constructed the country house Øregård in 1806. The house was designed by Joseph-Jacques Ramée. He was known for his extravagant life style. He ran into economic problems. In 1848, Søbøtker returned to Copenhagen. He died in Frederiksberg on 23 March 1854. He is buried at Assistens Cemetery.

He became kammerherre 1830, Knight of the Order of the Dannebrog in 1826, Dannebrogsmand and finally Commander of the Order of the Dannebrog in 1837. His former country house Øregård opened as a museum in 1821. The park is also open to the public. Søbøtkers Allé, located a few streets from the park, is named after him.
