= Bertel Bjørnsen =

Mayor of Helsingør, Denmark

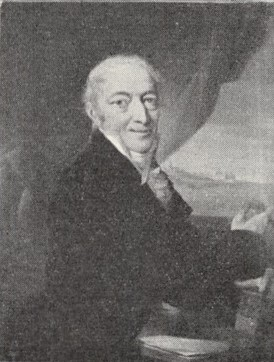
Bertel Bjørnsen.

Bertel Bjørnsen (28 September 1749 - 20 April 1820) was mayor of Helsingør, Denmark. He was succeeded by Jacob August (Maribo) Stenfeldt

== Early life and education ==
Bjørnsen was born on 28 September 1749 to the son of Supreme Court justice Bjørn Bertelsen Bjørnsen and Marie Dorothea neée Esmarch. He earned the (Exam. Juris from the University of Copenhagen in 1771. As of the same year, he worked as a copyist in Danske Kancelli. He earned the Master of Law degree in 1773.

== Career ==
In 1775, Bjørnsen became a secretary in Danske Kancelli. In 1776, he was sent to Helsingør as 'rown bailiff and councilman. In the same year he was awarded the title of kancelliråd. In 1782, he became the city's mayor (burgermaster). In 1807, he was awarded the title of etatsråd.He was succeeded by Jacob August (Maribo) Stenfeldt.

== Personal life and legacy ==
Bjørnsen was married to Petrea Cathrine Reiersen on 1 October 1777.

The building at Stengade 38 was constructed for Bjørnsen in 1802–03.

Bjørnsen died on 20 April 1820. His widow died on 26 Oct. 1833 i Helsingør. Their daughter Frederiche was married to the businessman Erich Engelbrecht Christophersen Holm.lsingør.
