= 1757 in Denmark =

- Decades: 1730s; 1740s; 1750s; 1760s; 1770s
- See also: Other events of 1757; List of years in Denmark

Events from the year 1757 in Denmark.

== Incumbents ==
- Monarch – Frederick V
- Prime minister – Johan Ludvig Holstein-Ledreborg

== Births ==
- 28 April – Claus Schall, violinist and composer (died 1835)
- 7 July – Johann Georg Preisler, engraver (died 1831)
- 15 November – Heinrich Christian Friedrich Schumacherm physician (died 1830)

=== Full date missing ===
- Johanna Elisabeth Dahlén, stage actress and opera singer (died 1845)

== Deaths ==
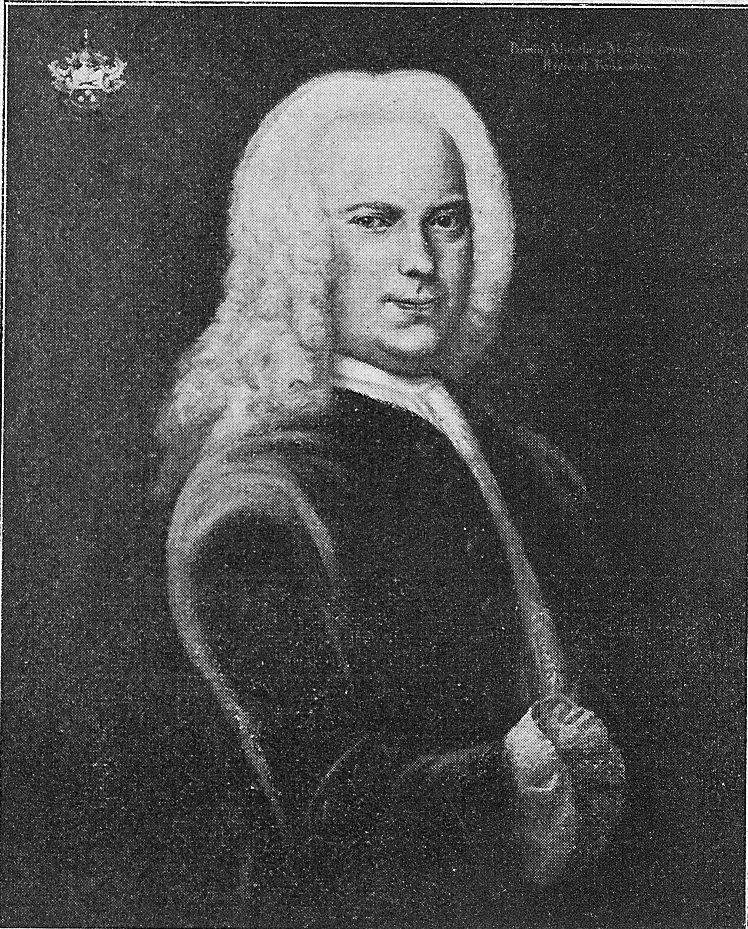
Bredo von Munthe af Morgenstierne.

- 13 January – Bredo von Munthe af Morgenstierne, civil servant, Supreme Court justice and landowner (born 1701)
- 4 April – Peder Hersleb, bishop (born 1689).
- 31 July – Abraham Lehn, landowner (born 1702)
- 27 June – Christine Sophie Holstein, salonist (born 1672)
- 3 September – Anna Catharina Materna, actress (born 1731)
- 22 December – Frederik Berregaardm government official and landowner (born 1724)
