= Birgitte Winther =

Birgitte Winther (1751 – 18 April 1809) was a Danish stage actress and opera singer. She was a prominent member of the Royal Danish Theatre from 1774 to 1805. She has been referred to as one of the three most noted female opera singers in 18th-century Denmark.

== Life ==
Birgitte Winther was the daughter of the school teacher Peder Winther and Bolette Marie Palle. She never married. She was one of the first students to be included in the first class of the newly founded opera school in 1773. She was the student of Michel Angelo Potenza.

She made her debut in 1774. Though active both as a singer and an actress, as was the custom at the Royal theater, she was famed as an opera singer. As an actress, she was somewhat criticized for being too stiff. As a singer, however, Winther was named the best opera singer in Denmark and as the prima donna of the Danish opera alongside Catharine Frydendahl and Caroline Frederikke Müller. She was considered undefeated in her ability to perform long arias.

Not only active at the Royal Danish Theatre, she also toured Denmark and performed on concerts at the countryside. Also in the capital, she frequently performed in concerts, and along Michael Rosing and Jens Musted, she often performed at the concerts hosted by Det musikalske Selskab and Det harmoniske Selskab, to such an extent that the Royal Theatre complained and stated that when Winther performed so often outside of the theatre, it was not longer necessary for the audience to come there to hear her, which caused the theatre a financial loss.

She retired in 1805 after a successful career and died in Copenhagen.
