= Thomas Lange (novelist) =

Danish novelist (1829–1887)

Thomas Lange (1829–1887) was a Danish novelist.

== Biography ==
Lange was born in Copenhagen. He studied theology, but was not ordained, and afterwards devoted himself to literature. His first writings were published anonymously and attracted little attention. It was not until Eventyets Land (1863) appeared that he was fitly appreciated. Later works gave him a place not much inferior to that of Goldschmidt in Danish literature.

== Works ==
- Eventyets Land (1863)
- Aaen og Havet (1870)
- Romantiske Skildringer (Romantic Descriptions, 1872), his masterpiece
- De lyse Nætter (1875)
- Et Symposion (1877)
- Nyt Liv (1879)
- En Kjærlighedshistorie (1882)
