= Adam Levin Søbøtker =

Danish planter, landowner, colonial official and military officer

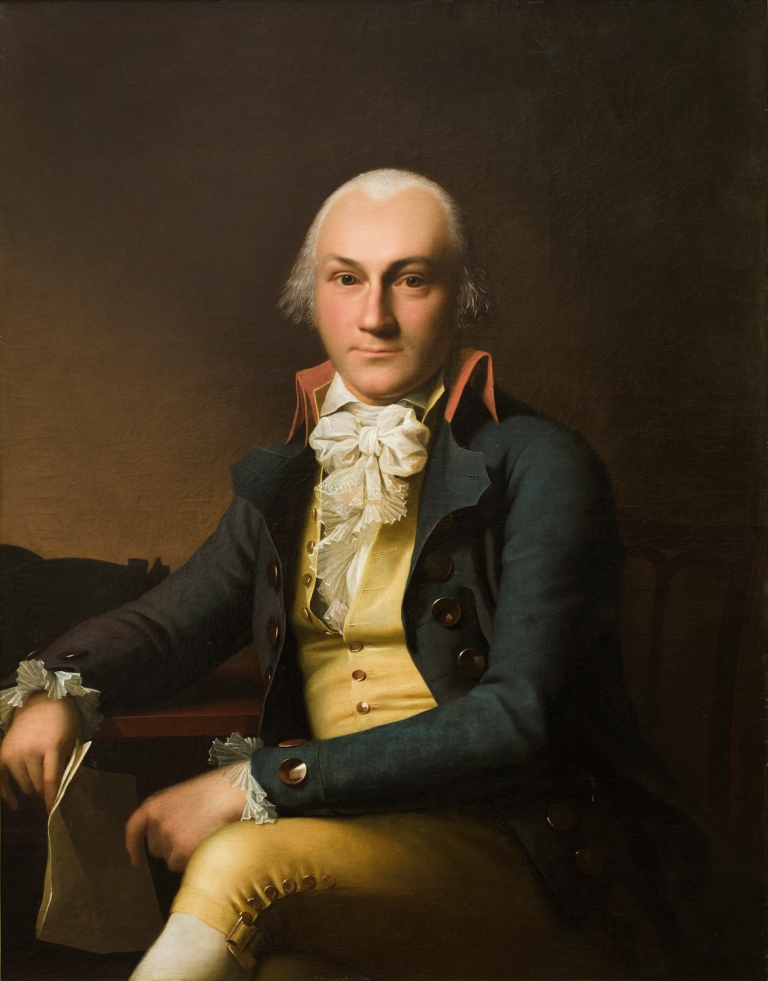
Adam Levin Søbøtker painted by Jens Juel in 1792

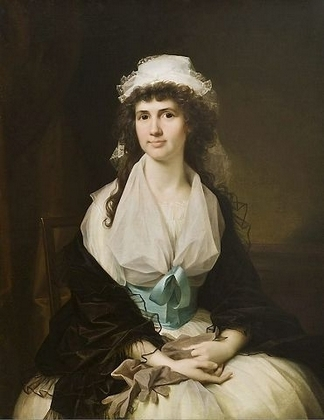
Susanne Søbøtker, née van Beverhoudt

Adam Levin Søbøtker (3 August 1753 – 2 February 1823) was a Danish planter, landowner, colonial official and military officer in the Danish West Indies. He was for a while the largest landowner on the islands and was the father of Johannes Søbøtker. Søbøtker was third generation of a family of planters in the Danish West Indies. He was the son of Johannes Søbøtker (born 1724) and Else Nielsdatter. He owned the slave plantations of Constitution Hill and Høgensborg on Saint Croix. He married Susanne van Beverhoudt; the couple had one child, Johannes, who was sent to Copenhagen but returned to the islands in 1821 where he became governor of St. Thomas and St. John.
