= 1760 in Denmark =

- Decades: 1740s; 1750s; 1760s; 1770s; 1780s
- See also: Other events of 1760; List of years in Denmark

Events from the year 1760 in Denmark.

== Incumbents ==
- Monarch – Frederick V
- Prime minister – Johan Ludvig Holstein-Ledreborg

== Events ==
- 7 March – HDMS Amack and HDMS Falster are launched at Nyholm in Copenhagen.

=== Undated ===
- Rinderpest epidemic and the beginning of the rinderpest eradication.

== Births ==
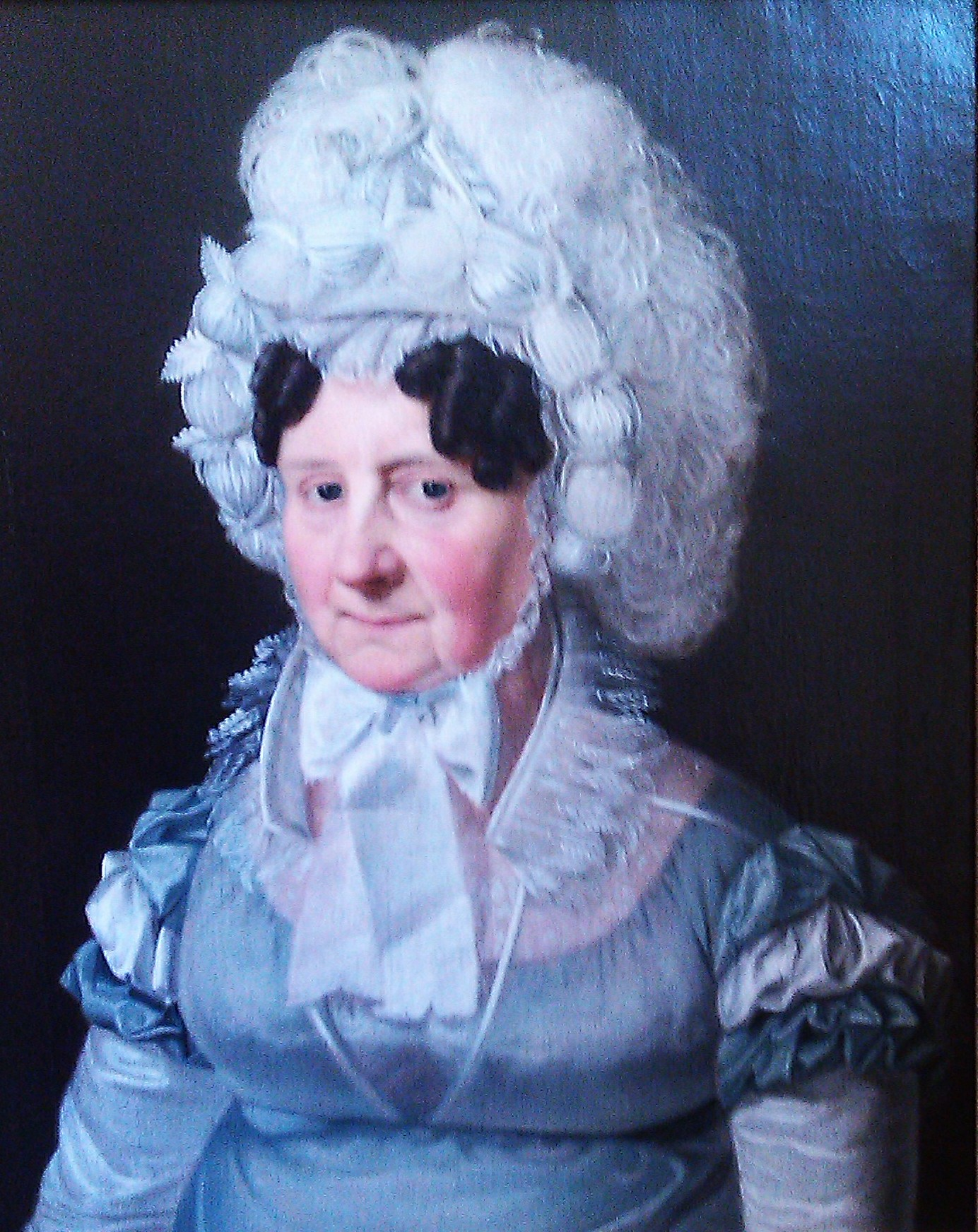
Marie Kofoed.

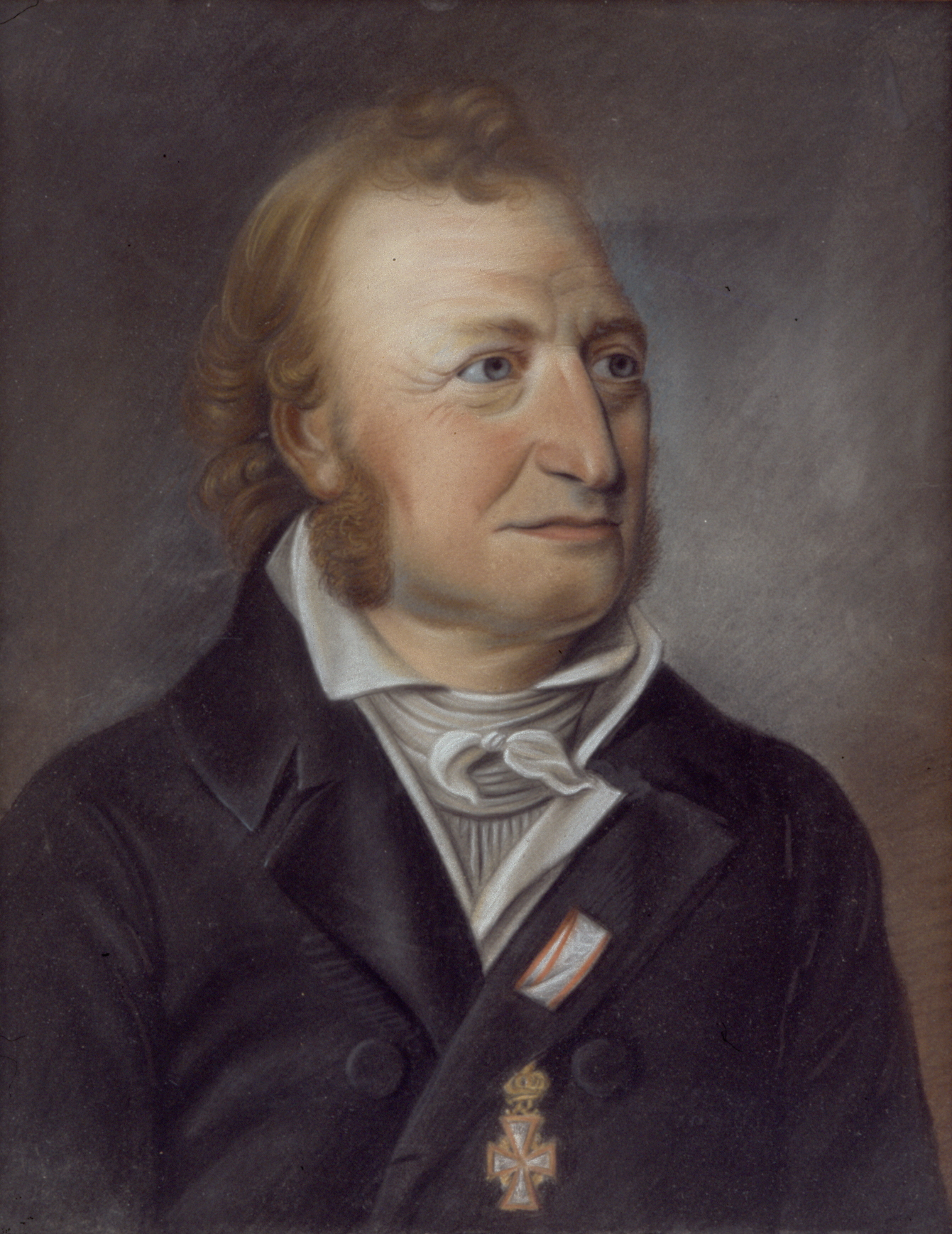
Knud Lyne Rahbek.

- 19 January – Marie Kofoed, businessperson and philanthropist (d. 1838)
- 11 February – Juliane Marie Jessen, author and translator (d. 1832)
- 20 March – Joseph Christian Lillie, architect and interior designer (died 1827)
- 25 April – Mette Marie Astrup, actress (died 1834)
- 5 May – Søren Læssøe Lange, painter and illustrator (died 1828)
- 29 September – Jens Jensen Berg, sea captain and businessman (died 1813)
- 6 November – Peter Ulrich Frederik Benzon, county governor and landowner (died 1840)
- 30 November – Catharine Frydendahl, opera singer (d. 1831)
- 18 December – Knud Lyne Rahbek, literary historian, critic, writer, poet, magazine editor and art administrator (died 1830)

== Deaths ==
- 28 September – Anna Sophie Schack, noblewoman and landlord (born 1689)
