= Johan Martin Schønheyder =

Danish Supreme Court attorney

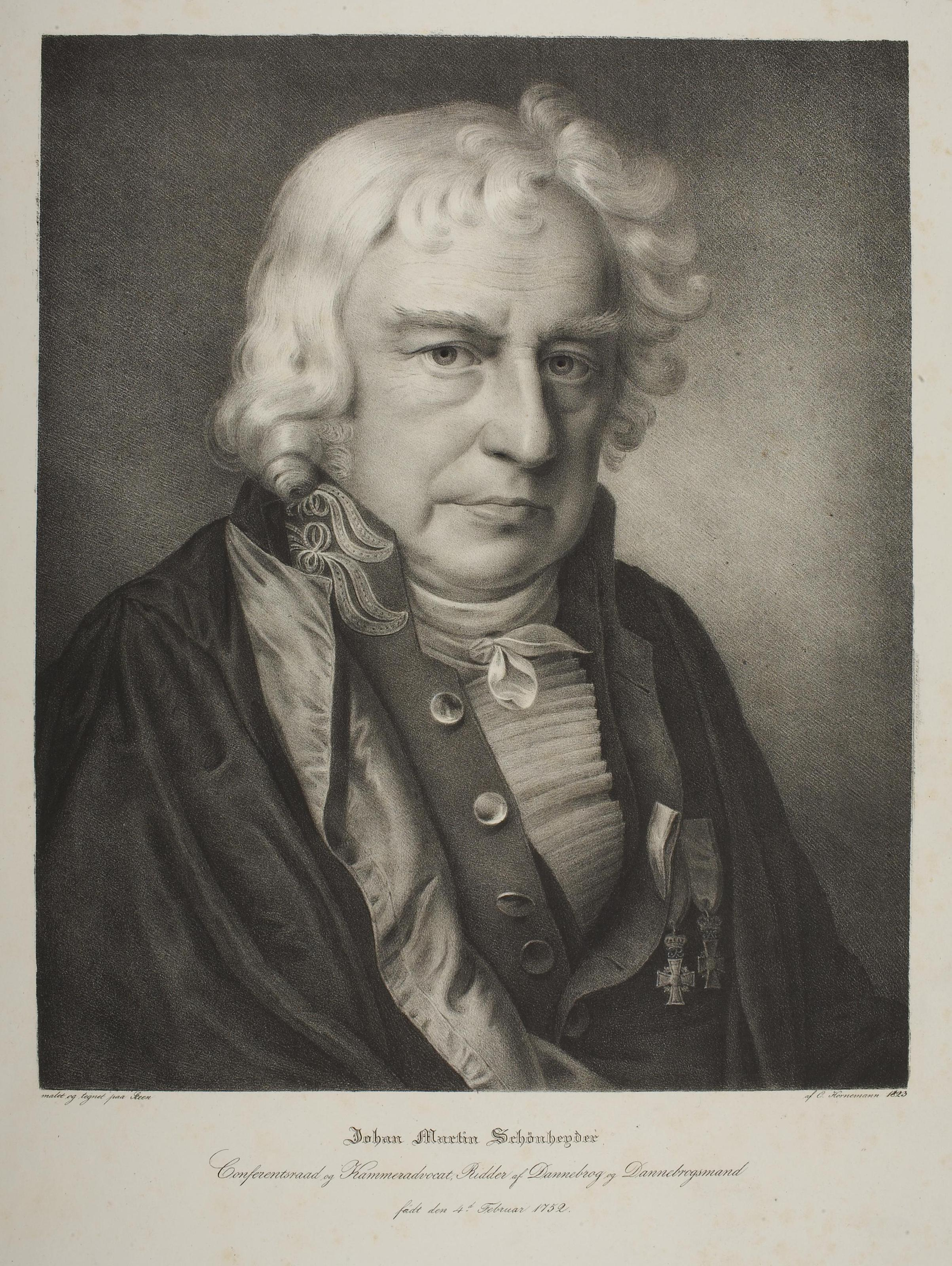
Johan Martin Schønheyder by Christian Horneman, 1823

Johan Martin Schønheyder (4 February 1752 – 9 July 1831) was a Danish Supreme Court attorney. In 1828, after closing his practice, he was appointed an extraordinary Supreme Court justice. He started practicing law during the time of Denmark-Norway.

== Early life and education ==
Schønheyder was born on 4 February 1752 in Copenhagen, the son of surgeon Johan Francisais Gottlieb Schønheyder (1701–77) and Mette Mossin (1713–66). He was the brother of clergy member Johan Christian Schønheyder and medical doctor Johan Henrich Schønheyder. He completed his schooling in 1765 and earned his Candidate of Law degree from the University of Copenhagen in 1772.

== Career ==
Schønheyder became a lawyer (overretsprokurator) in Denmark–Norway in 1772. In 1774, he became licensed as a Supreme Court attorney. In 1785, he was appointed Attorney-General (kammeradvokat). In 1809, he declined an offer to become a Supreme Court justice. In 1828, after he had resigned as attorney-general and closed his private practice, he was appointed as an extraordinary Supreme Court justice.

Schønheyder was known as an unusually sharp jurist with exceptional rhetorical skills. Many high-profile cases were therefore entrusted to him by the government and private clients. In 1791, he represented Christian Colbiørnsen in his lawsuit against the landowner C. T. F. Lüttichau. In 1813, he was appointed a member of a commission tasked with investigating various financial matters. In 1818, he became a member of the commission that prepared an octroi for the National Bank. He published some Supreme Court proceedings and speeches given at the opening of the Supreme Court.

== Personal life ==
Schøneyder married on 8 August 1781 in Kristiansand to Johanne Margrethe Smith (1758–1822), She was a daughter of provost Morten Smith (1722–1800) and Mette Kirstine Petersen (1737–86). Three sons and two daughters lived to adulthood.

== Awards ==
In 1803, he was awarded the title of justitsråd, and in 1805, he was awarded the title of etatsråd. In 1822, he was awarded the title of konferensråd. He was created a Knight of the Order of the Dannebrog in 1809. In 1813, he was awarded the Order of the Dannebrog's Cross of Honour.
