= Salomon Ahron Jacobson =

Jewish Danish medallist engraver and sculptor (1755–1830)

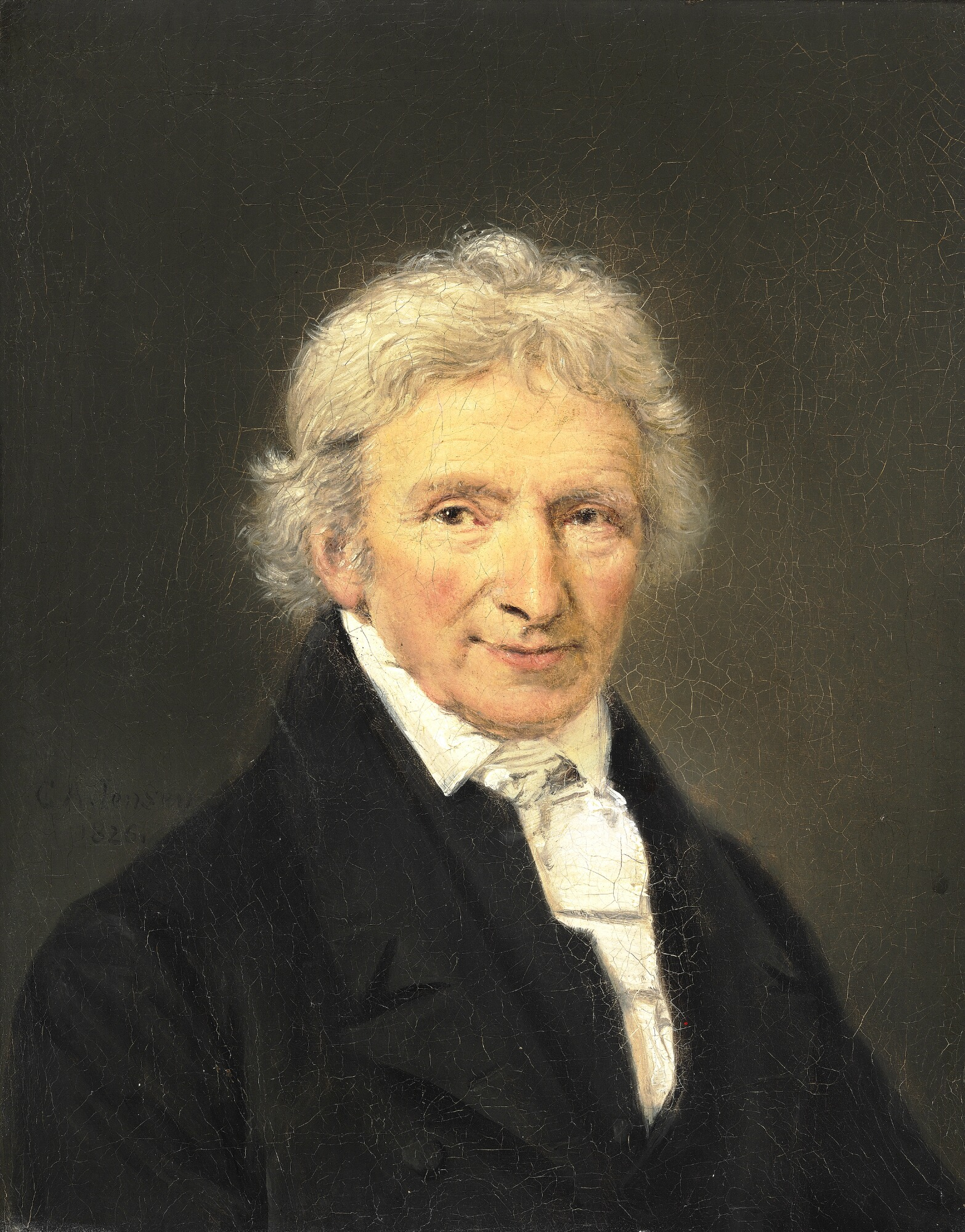
- Jacobson painted by C. A. Jensen in 1828
- Born: April 1755; Copenhagen, Denmark
- Died: 28 June 1830 (aged 75); Copenhagen, Denmark
- Known for: Medallist, sculptors, engraver

Salomon Ahron Jacobson (April 1755 – 28 June 1830) was a Jewish Danish medallist engraver and sculptor. He and his brother David Jacobson succeeded their father Ahron Jacobson as court seal-engravers hofsignetstikkere) to Christian VII in 1775. The more talented of the two brothers, he is represented in Bersgøe's registry of Danish medals with 31 entries, including medals commemorating the coronation of Frederick VI (1915), the new Copenhagen City Hall (1815) and the Reformation Jubilee (1817). In 1788–1790 and again in 1796–1801, he lived and worked in Stockholm. He was a member of both the Danish and Swedish art academies.

== Early life and education ==
Jacobson was born in Copenhagen, the son of court seal-engraver Ahron Jacobson (c. 1717–75) and Frederikke Nathan (1715–89). His father had moved to Copenhagen from Hamburg in the 1740s. He was trained as an engraver under the guidance of his father. He grew up in his father's property at Gammel Strand 40 (then No. 11).

== Career ==
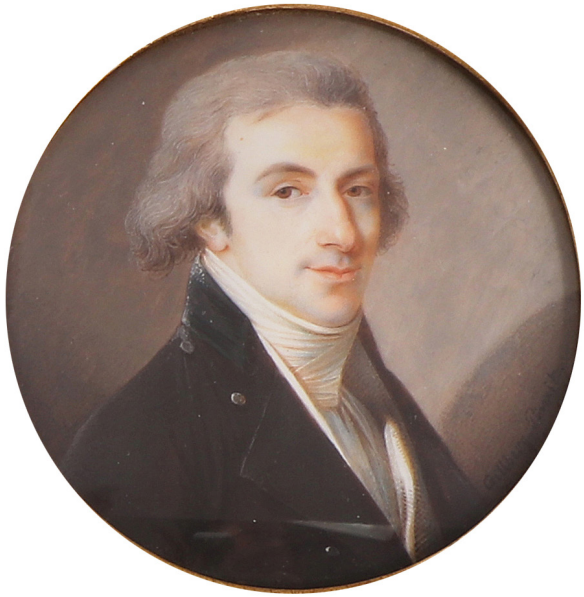
Miniature portrait of Salomon Jacobson by Axel Gillberg.

Jacobson and his brother David succeeded their father as seal engraver to the Royal Danish Court after his death in 1775. At the time of the 1787 census the two brothers were both residing in the family's property on Gammel Strand.

In 1788, Jacobson moved to Stockholm to work for Gustav III. While in Stockholm, he was made a member of the Royal Swedish Art Academy. After returning to Copenhagen, in 1790, he applied for membership of the Royal Danish Academy, but was not accepted as a member until 1796. In 1796–1801 he once again lived in Stockholm.In 1799, Finanskollegiet in Copenhagen asked him for advice on technical improvements of the Royal Mint. He was tasked with a few assignments for the mints in Altona and Kongsberg.

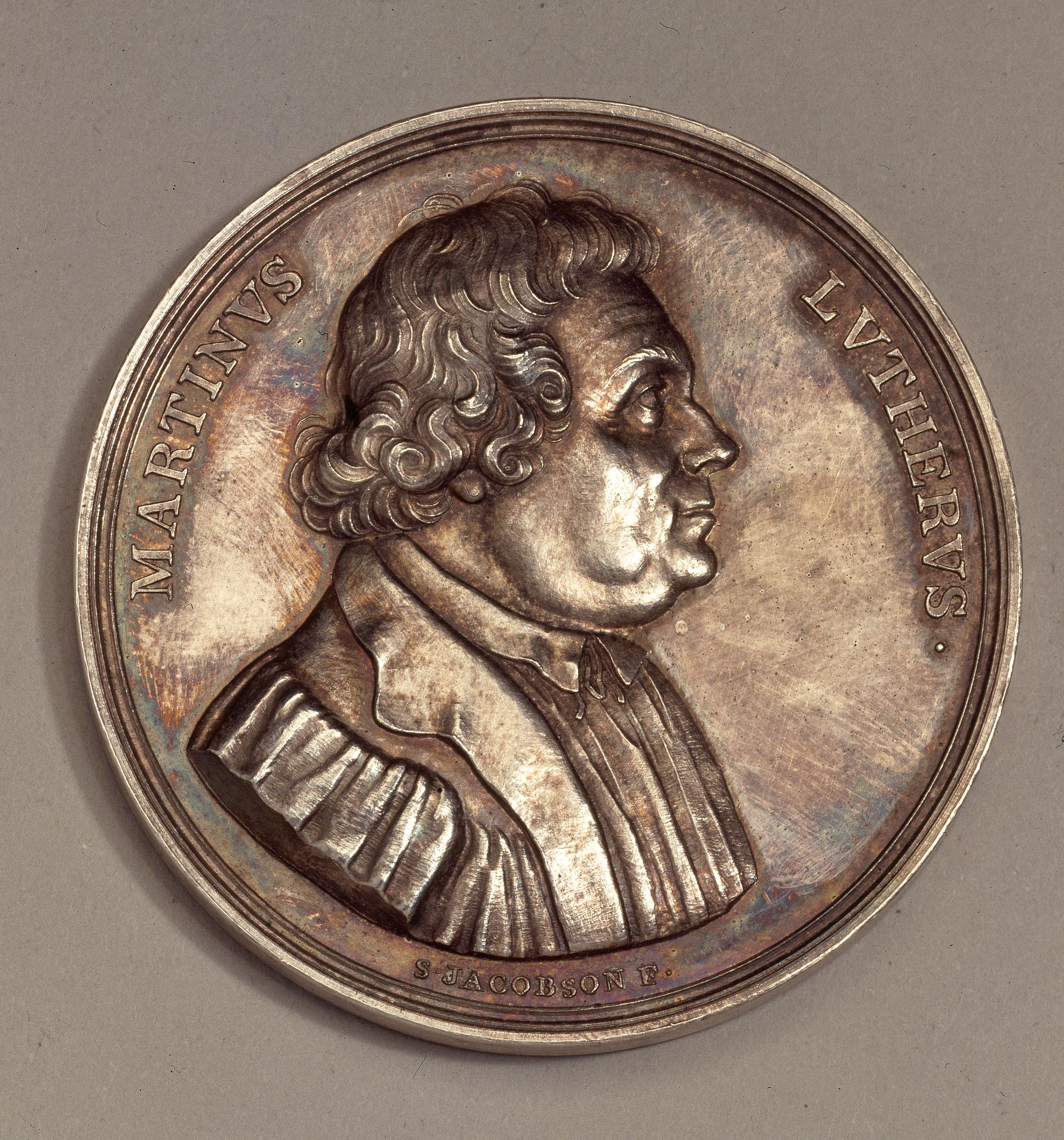
Reformation Jubilee Medal, front side, 1817.

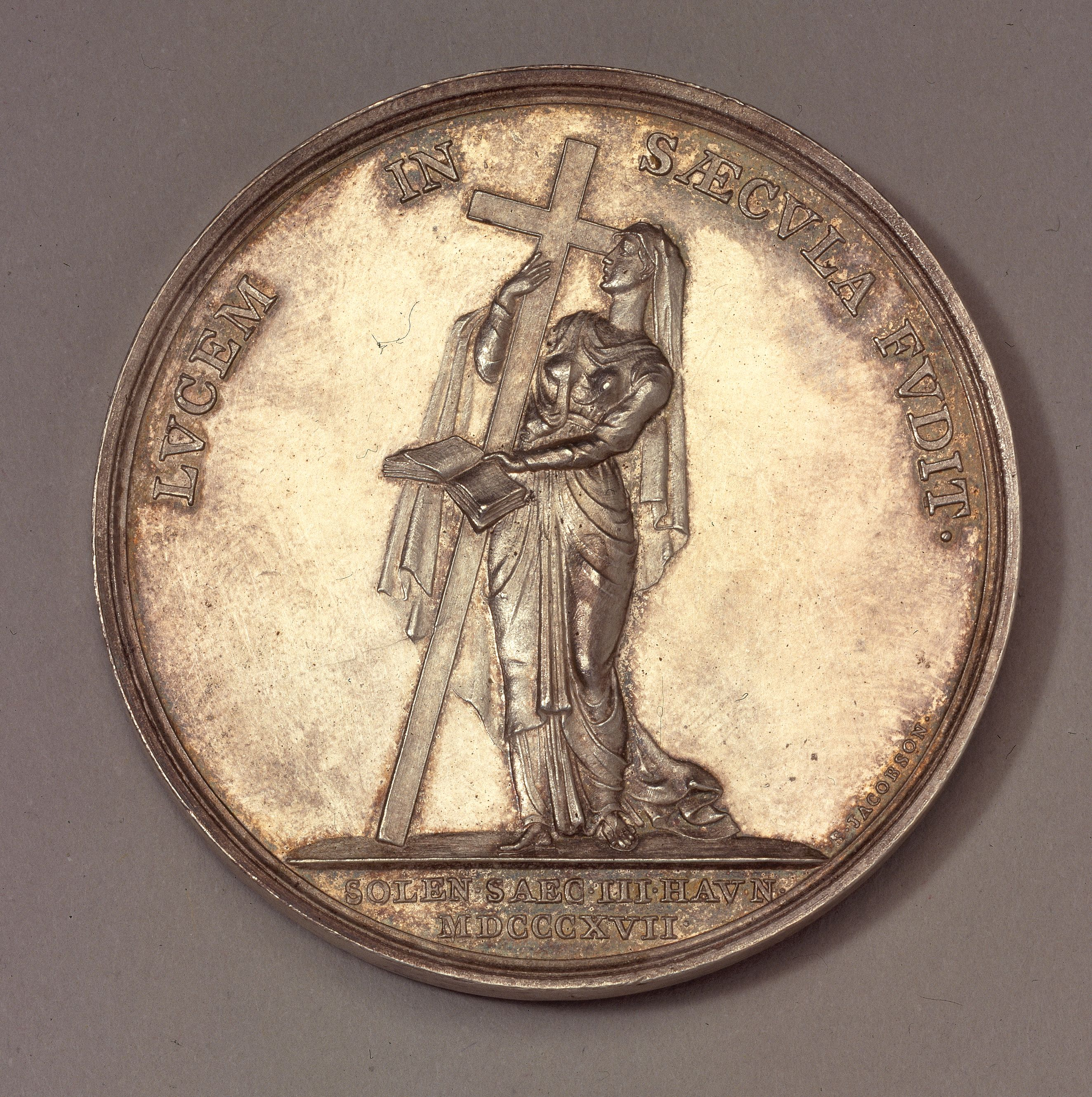
Reformation Jubilee Medal, reverse, 1817.

Jacobson is represented with 31 entries in Bergsøe's registry of Danish medals. His most notable works include the medals in conjunction with the coronation in 1915, the new Copenhagen City Hall (1815) and the Reformation Jubilee (1817). Most of his other medals were portrait medals commemorating members of the royal family and other leading figures of the time. Ub 1826, he created the stamp for a Tranquebar Madras rupee. He has also carved a number of works in stone ((chalcedony, carnelian and amethyst), for instance of mythological figures. He was created a titular professor in 1820.

== Personal life ==
On 19 May 1779, Jacobson married Merle v. Halle (1763-1803), She was a daughter of guldtrækker Levin Wulff v. Halle (1770-1750) and Kneudel Cohen (c. 1735–1804). He was the father of court stamp-engraver Albert Jacobson and medical doctor Ludvig Jacobson. He died on 28 June 1830 and is buried in Copenhagen's Jewish Northern Cemetery.

== Selected works ==
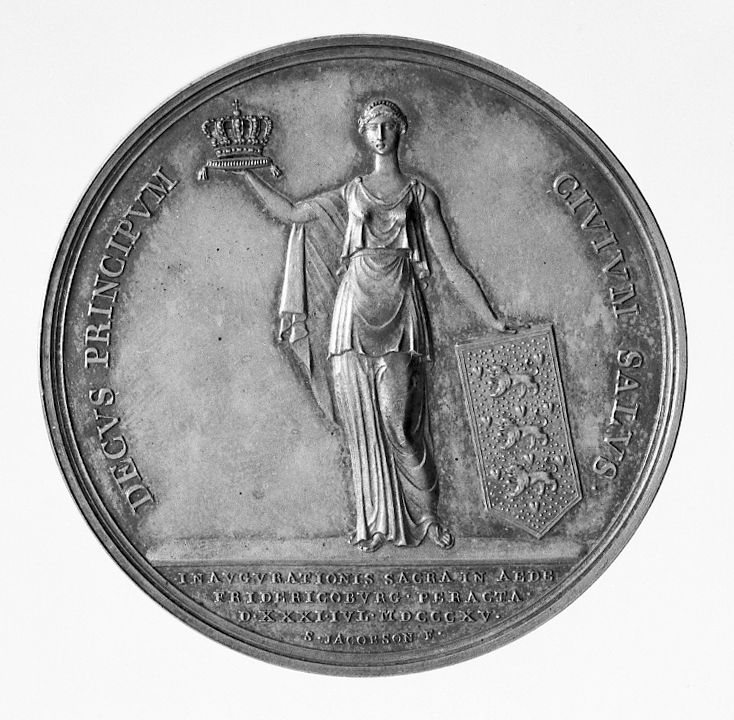
Coronation medal of Frederick VI, 1915.

- Medal to Ole Borch (1791)
- Medal to Johan Frederik Classen (1792)
- Medal to Andreas Peter Bernstorff (1795)
- Medal to Henrik Callisen (1805)
- Medal to Crown Princess Marie (1805)
- Frederick VI's Coronation Medal (1817)
- Reformation Jubilee Medal (1817)
- Medal to Queen Marie (1819)
- Medal to George Cuvier (1820)
- Medal to Johann Friedrich Blumenbach (1822,)
- Medal to Peter Hersleb Classen
- C. D. v. Kreber (1828)
