= 1839 in Denmark =

- Decades: 1810s; 1820s; 1830s; 1840s; 1850s
- See also: Other events of 1839; List of years in Denmark

Events from the year 1839 in Denmark.

== Incumbents ==
- Monarch – Frederick VI (until 3 December), then Christian VIII
- Prime minister – Otto Joachim

== Events ==
January

- 8 January – By Roual Order of 8 January 1738, sletdaler (coin) is replaced by the kurantdaler (= 4 mark à 16 skilling).

December

- 3 December – Frederick VI dies, and Christian VIII becomes King of Denmark

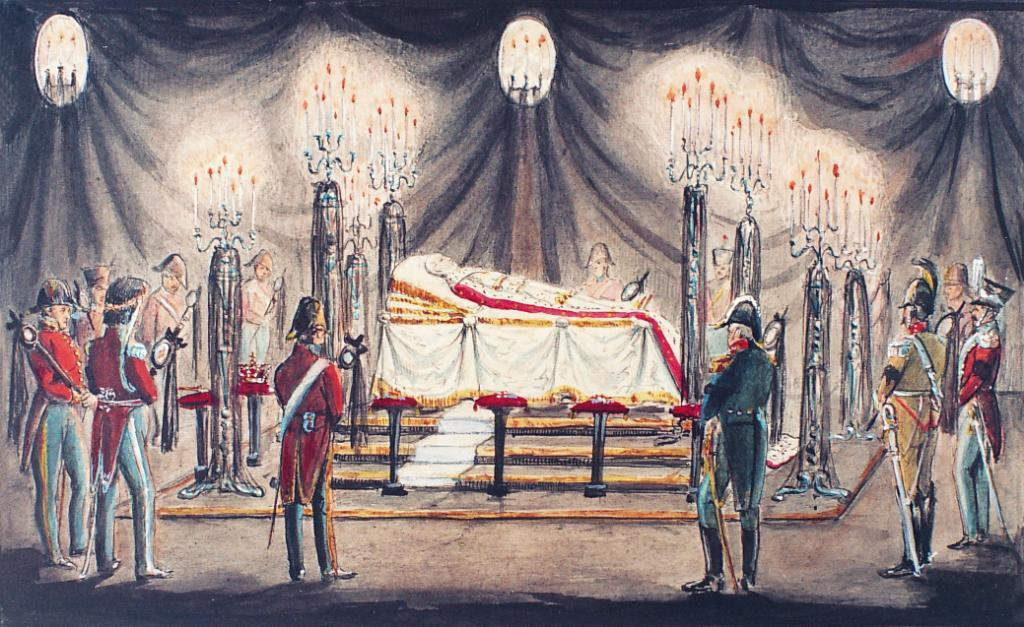
King Frederick VI lying on lit de parade

== Births ==
=== January–March ===
- 8 January – Anna Henriette Levinsohn, opera singer (died 1899)
- 25 January – Frederikke Federspiel, photographer (died 1913)
- 6 February – Caroline Testman, women's rights activist (died 1919)
- 15 February – Hieronymus Georg Zeuthen, mathematician (died 1920)
- 18 February – Hermann Baagøe Storck, architect (died 1922)
- 13 March – Tage Reedtz-Thott, politician, prime minister of Denmark (died 1923)

=== April–June ===
- 10 June – Ludvig Holstein-Ledreborg, politician, prime minister of Denmark (died 1912)

=== July–September ===
- 21 August Otto Bache, painter (died 1927)
- 26 August – Kristen Feilberg, photographer (died 1919)
- 23 September - Wilhelmine Schröder, royal favorite (died 1924)

=== October–December ===
- 2 October – Hans Smidth, artist (died 1917)
- 12 October – Frederik Bergmann Larsen, physician (born 1916)
- 31 November – Niels Steenberg, engineer (died 1915)
- 4 December – Louise Hegermann-Lindencrone, playwright and salonist (died 1833)

== Deaths ==
- 7 January – Adam Gottlob von Krogh, military officer (born 1978 in Norway)
- 29 March – Giuseppe Siboni opera singer and director (born 1780)
- 18 August – Bendix Frantz Ludwig Schow, mayor (born 1778)
- 27 October – Frederik Hauch, Postmaster-General (born 1754)
- 3 December – Frederick VI, King of Denmark (born 1768)

Full date missing

- Hans Wassard, businessman and landowner (born 1756)
