= 1833 in Denmark =

- Decades: 1810s; 1820s; 1830s; 1840s; 1850s
- See also: Other events of 1833; List of years in Denmark

Events from the year 1833 in Denmark.

== Incumbents ==
- Monarch – Frederick VI
- Prime minister – Otto Joachim

== Births ==
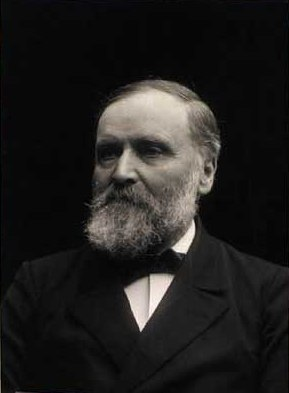
Ludvig Fenger.

=== January–March ===
- 29 January – Carl Frederik Aagaard, painter (died 1895)
- 20 February – Heinrich von Nutzhorn, composer (died 1025)
- 22 February – Carl Ludwig Jessen, painter (died 1917)

=== April–June ===
- 12 May – Georg Emil Hansen, photographer (died 1891)
- 8 June – Therese Brummer, writer (died 1896)

=== July–September ===
- 7 July – Ludvig Fenger, architect (died 1905)
- 26 August – Christian Vilhelm Nielsen, architect (died 1910)
- 18 September – Herman Siegumfeldt, painter (died 1912)

== Deaths ==
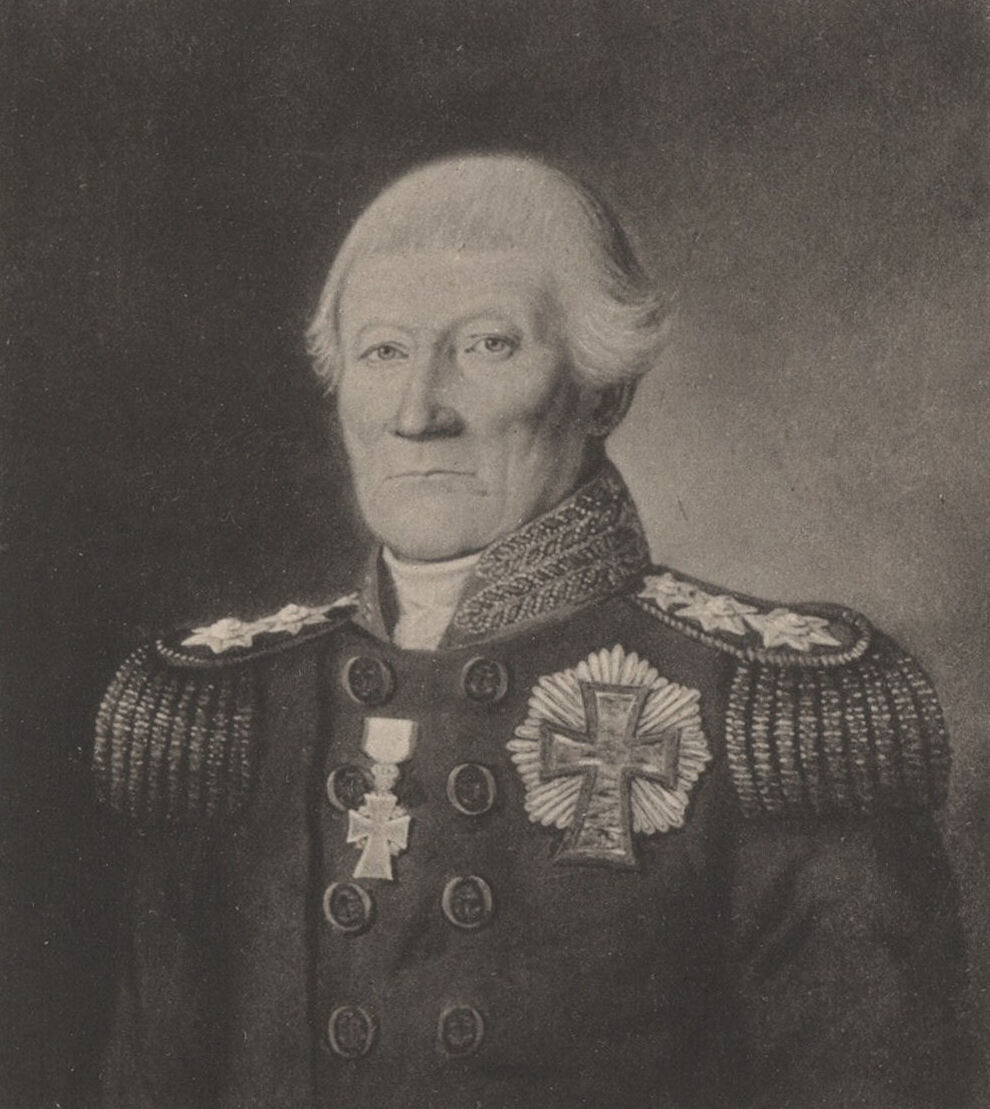
Steen Andersen Bille.

- 3 February – Johan Frederik Bardenfleth, naval officer, court official and governor-general of the Danish West Indies (born 1772)
- 15 April – Steen Andersen Bille, admiral (born 1751)
- 17 June – Louise Hegermann-Lindencrone, playwright and salonist (born 1778)
- 30 November – Gerhard Ludvig Lahde, engraver (born 1765)
