= 1912 in Denmark =

- Decades: 1890s; 1900s; 1910s; 1920s; 1930s
- See also: Other events of 1912; List of years in Denmark

Events from the year 1912 in Denmark.

== Incumbents ==
- Monarch – Frederick VIII (until 14 May), Christian X
- Prime minister – Klaus Berntsen

== Events ==
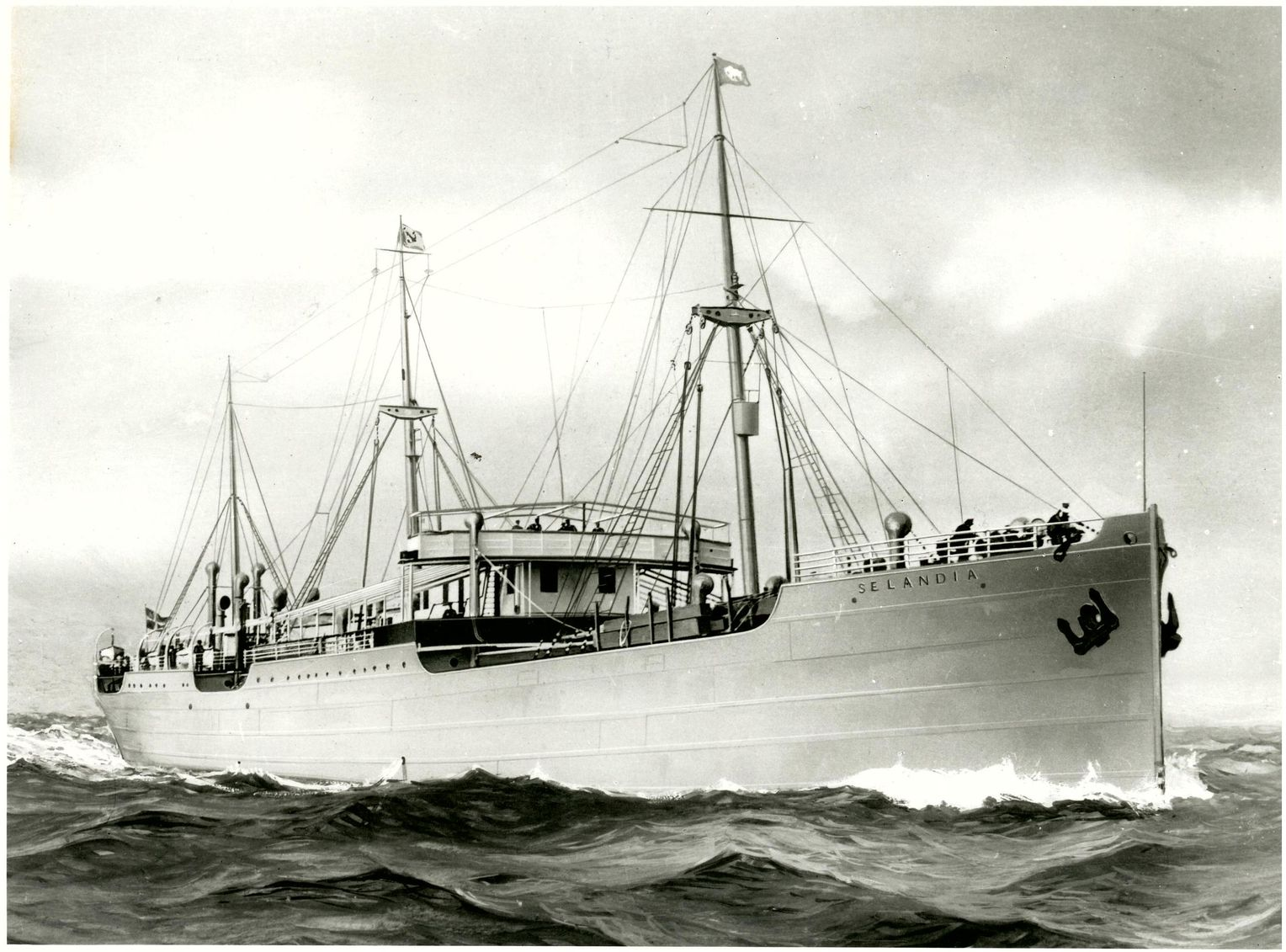
MS Selandia

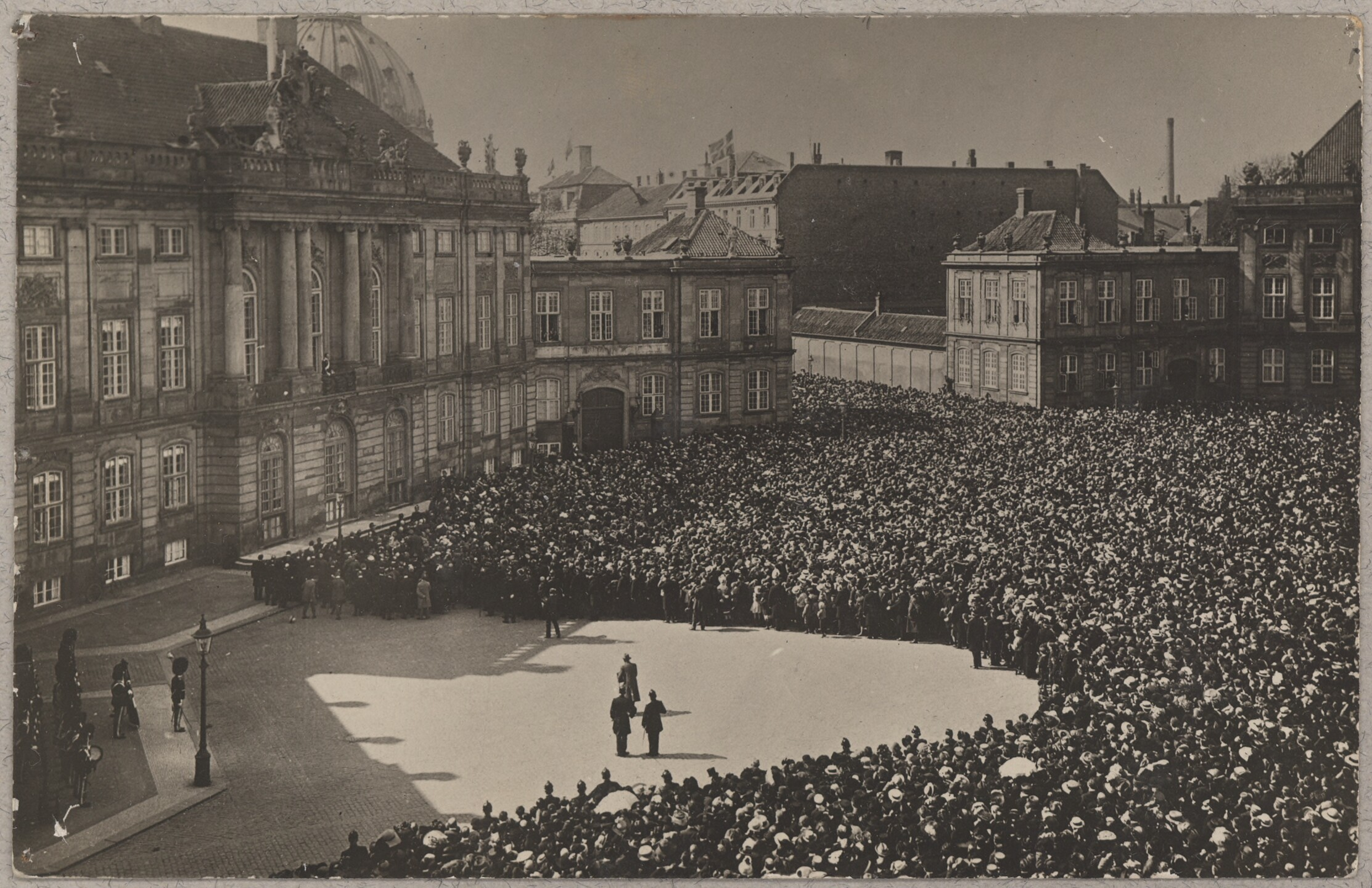
15 May: The proclamation of Christian X as king of Denmark.'

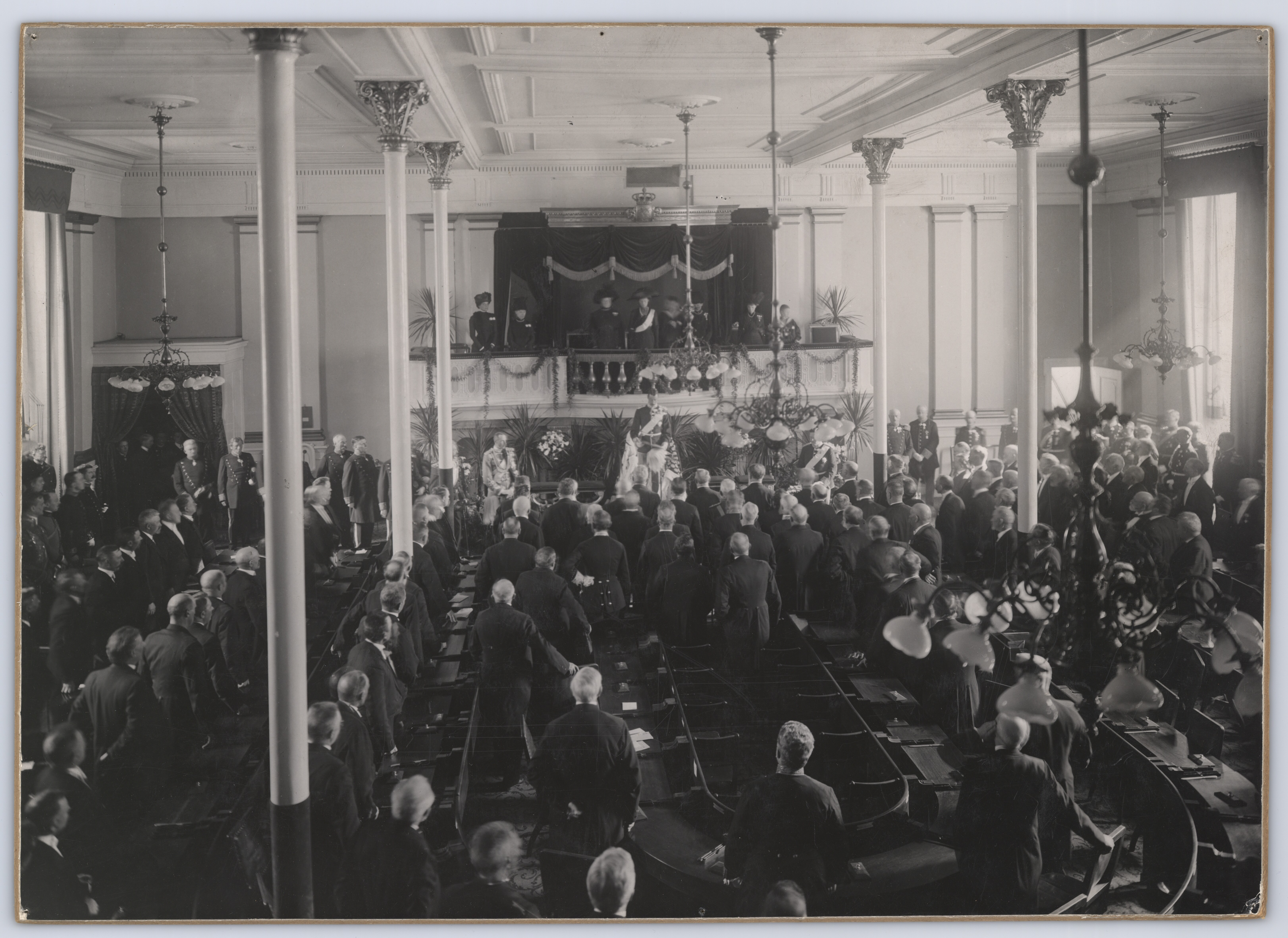
7 October: The opening of Rigsdagen.

February

- 17 February – The Danish Union of Press Photographers is founded as the first national organization for newspaper photographers in the world.
- 22 February – MS Selandia, the world's first ocean-going diesel-powered ship, departs Copenhagen on her maiden voyage, bound for Bangkok, with two B&W four-stroke diesel engines.

May

- 14 May – Frederick VIII dies and his son, Christian X, becomes king of Denmark.
- 15 May – The proclamation of Christian X as King of Denmark.

August

- 5 August – The Rebild Festival is held for the first time, delayed compared to the planned date, the American Independence on July 4, due to a period of national mourning upon King Frederik VII's sudden death. The celebrations are attended by somewhere between 10,000 and 15,000 people.

September

- 18 September – Count Zeppelin lands his Zeppelin airship Hansa on Kløvermarken, its first destination outside Germany.
- 28 September – Jacob Ellehammer takes off for the first time in his self-built Ellehammer helicopter.

== Culture ==
=== Music ===
- 27 February – Carl Nielsen's Violin Concerto and Symphony No. 3 are performed in public for the first time.

== Sports ==
- 1 September – Aalborg Chang is founded.

== Births ==
=== January–March ===
- 30 January – Finn Juhl, architect and designer (died 1989)
- 18 February – Gustaf Munch-Petersen, writer and painter (died 1938)
- 14 March – Johan Jacobsen, film director (died 1972)
- 30 March – Knud Rex, actor (died 1968)

=== April–June ===
- 3 April – Kjeld Philip, economist and politician (died 1989)
- 27 April – Princess Caroline-Mathilde of Denmark, hereditary princess (died 1995)
- 4 June – Robert Jacobsen, artist (died 1993)
- 10 June – Abraham Kurland, wrestler (died 1999)

=== July–September ===
- 1 July – Ulla Barding-Poulsen, Olympic fencer (died 2000)
- 2 August – Palle Huld, actor (died 2010)
- 10 September – Herluf Bidstrup, cartoonist (died 1988)
- 16 September – Sven Havsteen-Mikkelsen, painter and illustrator (died 1999)

=== October–December ===
- 1 October – Anders Ejnar Andersen, politician (died 2006)
- 22 October – Peer Guldbrandsen, screenwriter, actor, film director and producer (d. 1996)

== Deaths ==
=== January–March ===
- 6 January – Georg Achen, painter (born 1860)
- 29 January – Herman Bang, writer (born 1857)
- 1 March – Ludvig Holstein-Ledreborg, politician, prime minister of Denmark (born 1839)

=== April–June ===
- 6 April – Carl Thomsen, painter (born 1847)
- 24 April – Eiler Rasmussen Eilersen, painter (born 1827)
- 14 May – Frederick VIII (born 1843)
- 20 May – Louis Hasselriis, sculptor (born 1844)
- 27 June– Herman Siegumfeldt, painter (born 1833)

=== October–December ===
- 23 November – Vilhelm Pacht, painter (born 1843)
- 25 November – Moses Melchior, businessman (born 1825)
