= 1914 in Denmark =

- Decades: 1890s; 1900s; 1910s; 1920s; 1930s
- See also: Other events of 1914; List of years in Denmark

Events from the year 1914 in Denmark.

== Incumbents ==
- Monarch – Christian X
- Prime minister – Carl Theodor Zahle

== Events ==
- January – Film censorship is abolished.
- 21 January – The Jerusalem Church in Tigensgade in Copenhagen is destroyed in a fire.
- 17 February – The first smørrebrød shop opens in Copenhagen.
- 7 March – Simon's Church is inaugurated in Copenhagen.
- 1 August – The government declares Denmark's neutrality in World War I.
- 31 August – The first (red) 1 krone bank notes enter circulation.
- 19 September – The Lurblæserne monument is completed at City Hall Square in Copenhagen.
- 3 October – St. Augustine's Church on Jagtvej in Copenhagen is inaugurated.
- 20 December – A large Christmas tree is for the first time lit on City Hall Square in Copenhagen.

== Sports ==
=== Date unknown ===
- Kjøbenhavns Boldklub wins the second Danish National Football Tournament by defeating B 93 4–2 in the final.

== Births ==
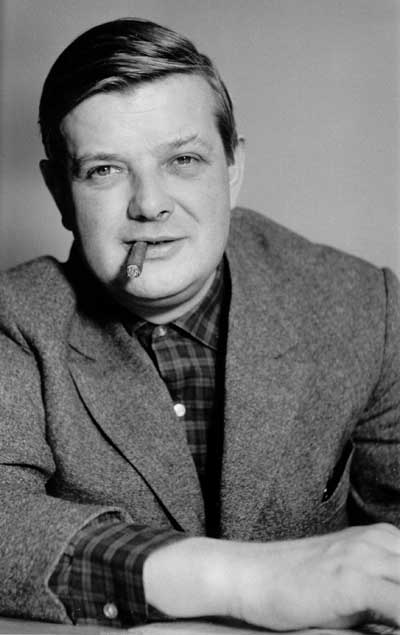
Børge Mogensen.

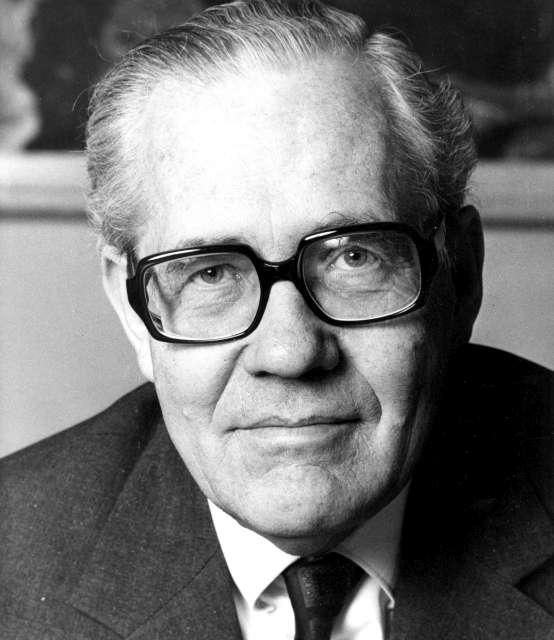
Poul Hartling.

=== January–March ===
- 13 January – Osa Massen, actress (died 2006)
- 4 February – Jette Bang photographer (died 1964)
- 3 March – Asger Jorn, painter (died 1973)

=== April–June ===
- 2 April – Hans Wegner, furniture designer (died 2007)
- 13 April – Børge Mogensen, furniture designer (died 1972)

=== July–September ===
- 5 July – Gerda Gilboe, actress and singer (died 2009)
- 14 August – Poul Hartling, politician, former prime minister (died 2000)
- 15 September – Jens Otto Krag, politician (died 1978)
- 21 September – Tonny Ahm, badminton player (born 1993)

== Deaths ==
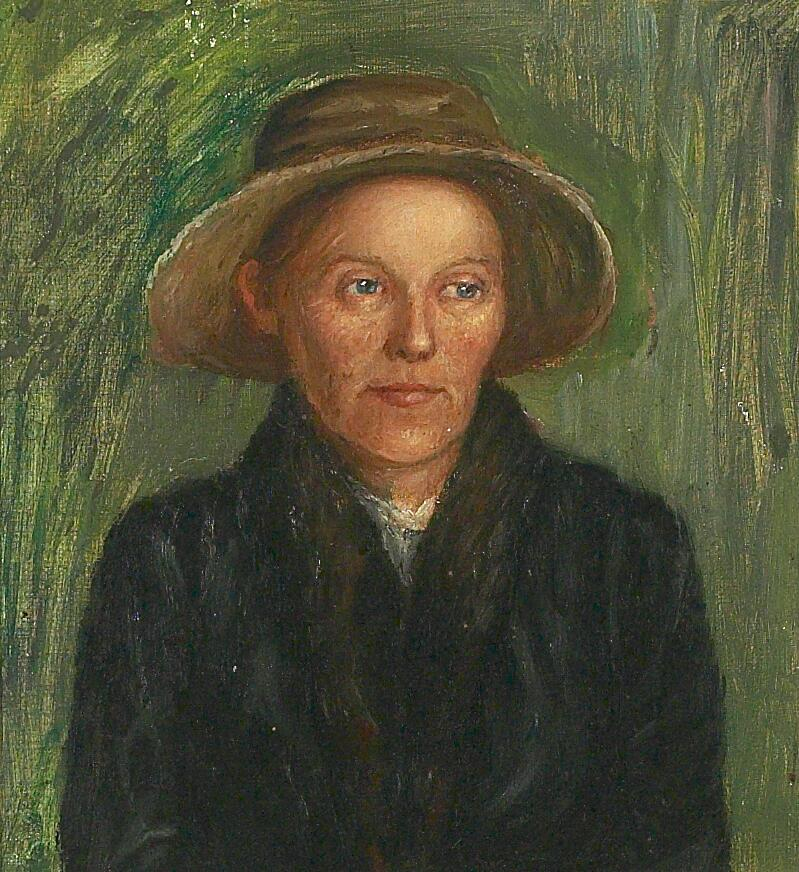
Anna Syberg.

=== January–March ===
- 11 January – Carl Jacobsen, brewer, industrialist and arts patron (born 1842)
- 12 January
  - Anton Dorph, painter (born 1831)
  - Louise Phister, actress (born 1816)
- 27 January – Mogens Ballin, painter and silversmith (died 1871)

=== April–June ===
- 1 April – Sophus Mads Jørgensen, chemist (born 1837)
- 14 April – Vilhelm Fischer, architect (born 1868)

=== July–September ===
- 4 July – Anna Syberg, painter, one of the "Funen Painters" (born 1870)
- 13 August – Anders Petersen, historian (died 1827)

=== October–December ===
- 24 November – Carl Wentorf, artist (born 1863)
- 10 December – Valdemar Riise, pharmacist (born 1853)
- 11 December – Nathan Heine, lawyer (born 1835)
