= Ploug House =

Building in Copenhagen, Denmark

Coordinates: 55.6780°N 12.5805°E

- Plougs Gård
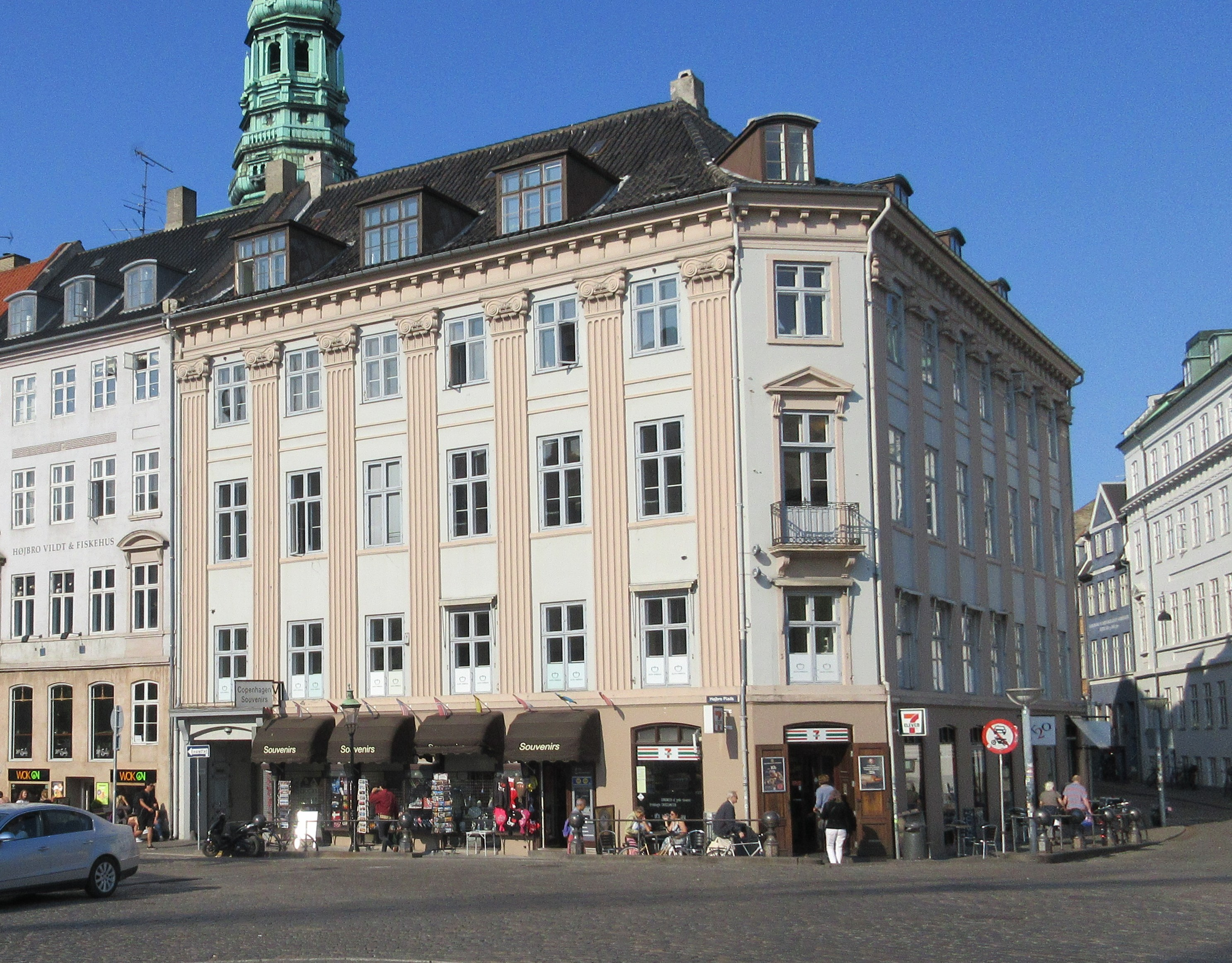
- Ploug House with the spire of the former St. Nicolas' Church in the background

General information
- Architectural style: Neoclassical
- Location: Copenhagen, Denmark, Denmark
- Construction started: 1798
- Completed: 1799
- Client: C. F. Friderici

Design and construction
- Architect: Andreas Hallander

Ploug House (Danish: Plougs Gård) is a listed Neoclassical property on the corner of Højbro Plads and Ved Stranden in central Copenhagen, Denmark. It dates from the building boom which followed after the Copenhagen Fire of 1795 but takes its name from the poet, publisher and politician Carl Ploug who lived there in the 1860s and 1870s and also published the newspaper Fædrelandet from the premises.

== History ==
=== Marsvin's House ===
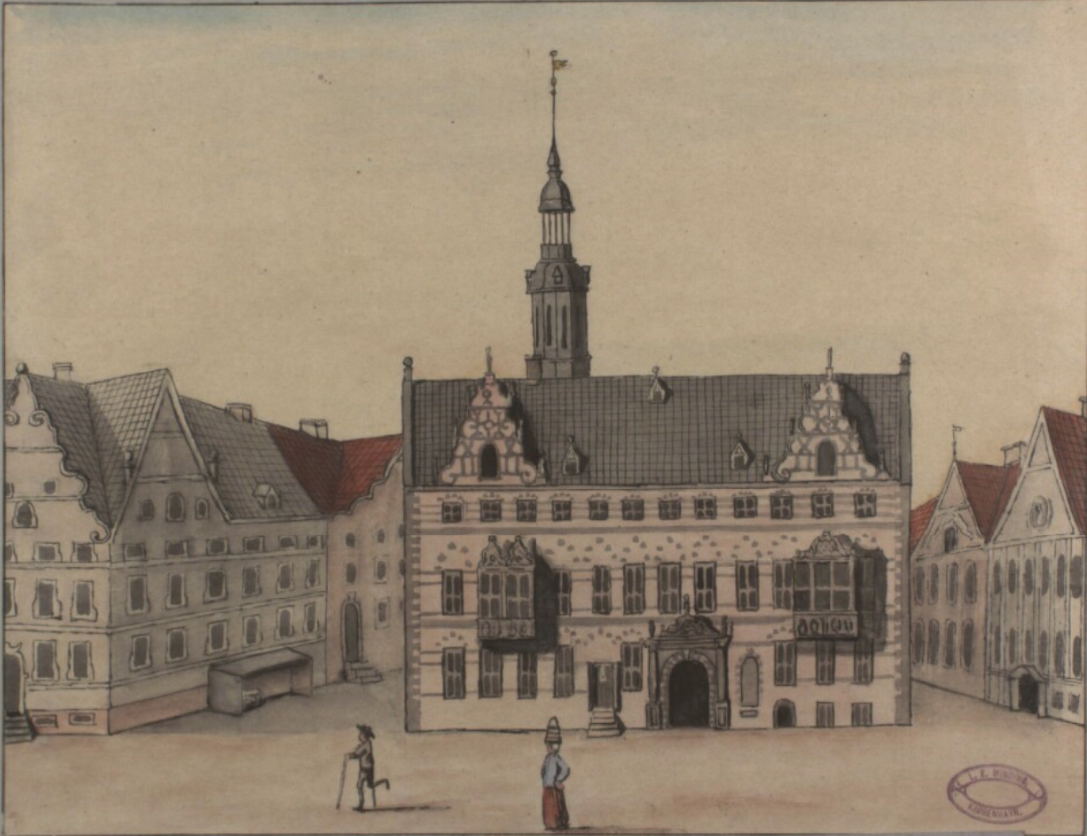
The Stenbock House in 1749

Christian IV's mother-in-law Ellen Marsvin constructed a large, Renaissance-style house at the site in the 17th century. The property was listed in Copenhagen's first cadastre of 1689 as No. 215 in the city's East Quarter. It was owned by Peter Weylandt at that time. It was later used for housing the Swedish military officer Magnus Stenbock during his five years in Danish captivity.

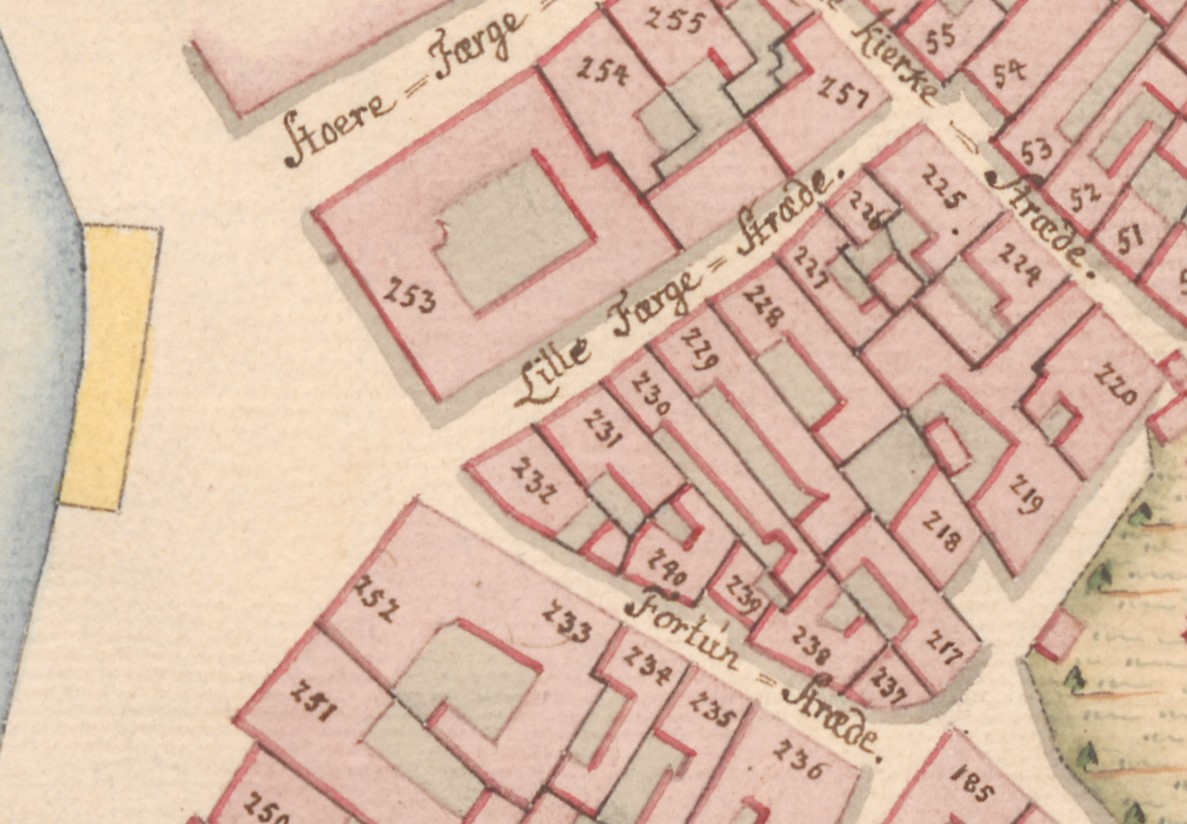
No. 253 seen in a detail from Christian Gedde's map of the East Quarter, 1757

The property was listed in the new cadastre of 1756 as No. 253 in the city's East Quarter.

=== Friderich Christian Friderici and the new building ===
The Marsvin House was destroyed in the Copenhagen Fire of 1795 along with most of the other buildings in the area. Part of the old No. 253 was subsequently used for the creation of Højbro Plads. The remains of the property were used of the construction of Højbro Plads 19–21.

The new corner building (Højbro Plads 21) was constructed on the foundation of the old house in 1798–1799 by Andreas Hallander for merchant (grosserer) Friderich Christian Friderici. In the new cadastre of 1806, his property was listed as No. 47 in the city's East Quarter.

Friderici's property was home to a total of 63 residents at the time of the 1801 census. The owner Friderich Christian Friderici resided in the building with his wife Maria Elisabeth Hendrichsen, their two sons (aged two and four), his mother-in-law Anne Maria Hendrichsen, a textile merchant (employee), a merchant's apprentice, three office clerks (employees), three trainees, one male servant, two maids, a seamstress, a wet nurse, a coachman and a caretaker. Johan Christian Peetz, a junk dealer, resided in the building with his wife Kirstine Bakke and their four children (aged seven to 17), Johann Hansen, a canvas merchant (lærredshandler), resided in the building with his wife Maren Børresen, their two-year-old daughter, one male servant and one maid. Carl Friderich Bergmann, a book binder, resided in the building with his wife Lowise Cornilia Hendrichsen (the wife's sister), their three children (aged two to nine), a book binder, three book binders' apprentices, two maids and a caretaker. James Frerral, a merchant, resided in the building with his wife Maria Hassel, their 11 children (aged one to 21), a governess, four maids, a male servant, a female cook and a caretaker.

The anatomist Hermann Treschow Gartner (1785–1827) lived in the building in 1823–1824. Joachim Dietrich Brandis (1762–1845), Queen Maria Sophie's physician, resided there until 1829.

=== 1840 census ===
The property was home to 69 residents in 10 households at the 1840 census. Christopher Mønster, a silk and textile merchant, resided on the ground floor with his wife Christine Søndergaard, their 15-year-old daughter Anne Hansine Mønster, two male servants and two maids. Pauvl Schouv, a flour merchant, resided on the ground floor with his wife Christine Eriksen, their nine children (aged 12 to 21), one male servant and one maid. Jacob Christensen, a restaurateur, resided on the first floor with his wife Marie Larsen, their three children (aged four to five), one lodger, one male servant and one maid. Samuel Heilbuth, a Jewish merchant (grosserer) and court broker, resided on the first floor with his wife Henriette Ahrensen, four of their children (aged 20 to 26), a six-year-old granddaughter, an office housekeeper and a maid. Sophie Langheim, the 62-year-old widow of an etatsråd, resided on the second floor with one maid. Ole Hjerrild, a wine merchant, resided on the second floor with his wife Ane Birk, their two daughters (aged 17 and 18), a vintner (employee), a vintner's apprentice, a male servant and a maid. Vallentin Vulff, a bookkeeper, resided on the third floor with his wife Sara Heilbuth, their five children (aged one to eight) and two maids. Vilhelmine le Mainz, a schoolmistress, resided on the third floor with her son/bookkeeper Emil le Mainz and two maids. Bergithe Hagermand, a 52-year-old widow needleworker, resided in the basement with her daughter Sophie Hagermand, a two-year-old son in her care and a lodger. Hans Haral Gram, a brick-layer, resided in the basement with his wife Ane Marie Møller and their three children (aged one to six).

=== The Melchiors and H. C. Andersen ===
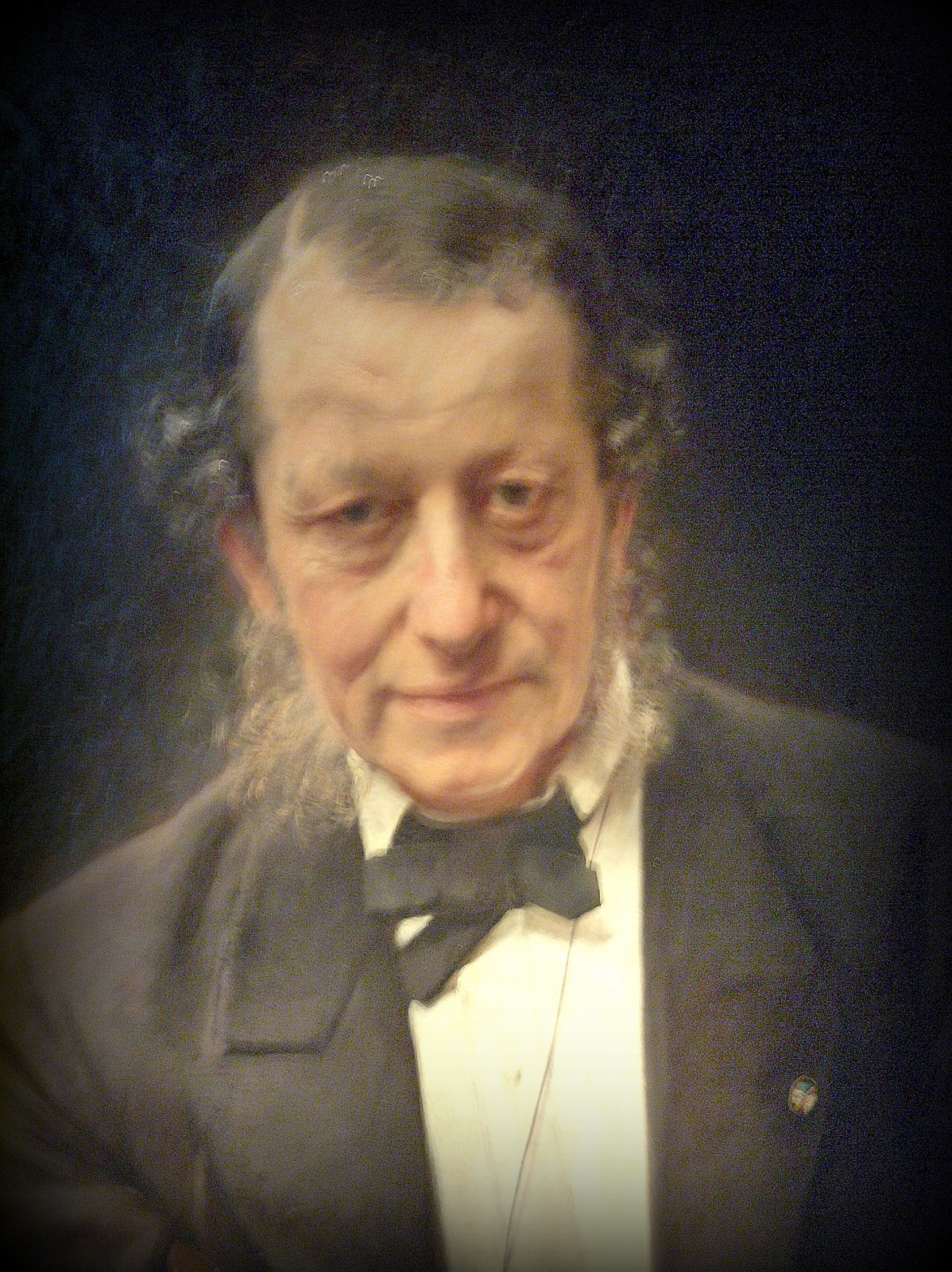
An aging Melchior painted by Bertha Wegmann

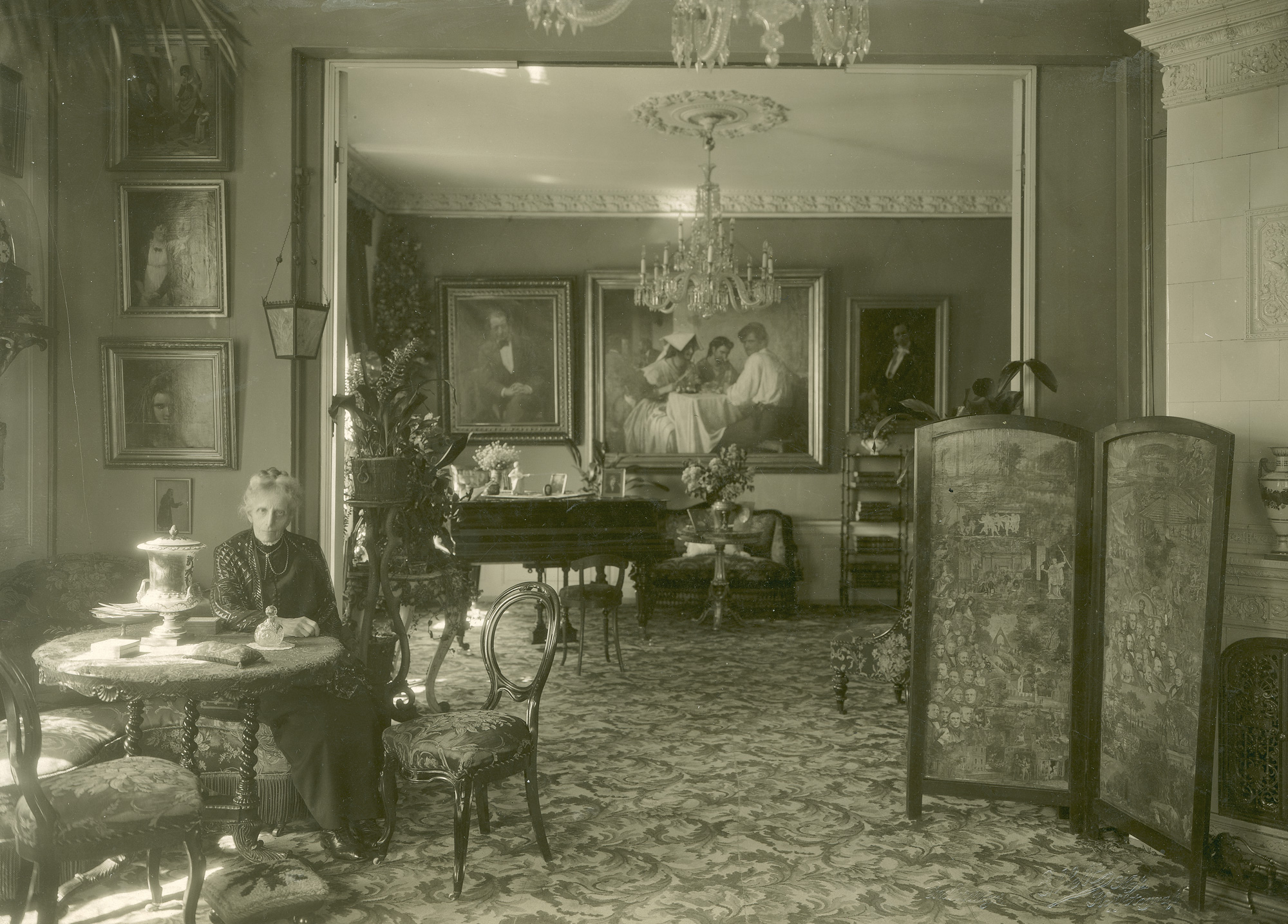
The Melchior home

Moritz G. Melchior, the owner of Moses & Søn G. Melchior, acquired the building in 1855. He lived with his family on the second floor and also ran his company from the premises. The Melchior family were among Hans Christian Andersen's closest friends. He stayed with the family from 13 March until 21 May 1870 in their residence on Højbro Plads, where he wrote What the Whole Family Said, and the Melchiors also hosted the celebration of his 70th birthday. Andersen usually visited the family for dinner on Thursdays. Other friends of the family, who would often also attend the Thursday dinners, included the painters Carl Bloch and Frederik Christian Lund, poet and museum administrator Carl Andersen and representatives of the press such as Dagbladet editor C. St. A. Bille, journalists Robert Watt and P. "Cabiro" Hansen and publisher and editor of Fædrelandet ('The Fatherland') Carl Ploug.

The property was home to 52 residents at the 1860 census. Moritz Gerson Melchior resided on the second floor with his wife Dorothea Melchior, their four children, a nurse, a housekeeper, an office courier, a coachman, a male servant, three maids and the student (family) Emil Villiam Moritz Melchior. Heinrich Hirschsprung resided on the first floor with his wife Pouline Elisabeth Hirschsprung, their five children (aged nine to 15), a female cook and two maids. Carl Ploug, publisher of Fædrelandet, resided on the third floor with his wife Frederikke Ploug, their four children (aged 12 to 24), a 19-year-old foster daughter, two maids and three lodgers. Meta Kathrine Marie Bang Boisen, widow of the clergyman Peter Outzen Boisen and daughter of N. F. S. Grundtvig, resided on the fourth floor with three of her children (aged 22 to 29) and one maid. Anna Dorothea Bech, manager of a bakery outlet, resided on the ground floor with two floor clerks and one maid. Hans Jeppesen, a 59-year-old man, resided on the third floor of the side wing with his wife Emilie Marie Jeppesen and their 16-year-old daughter.

=== Carl Ploug and later history ===
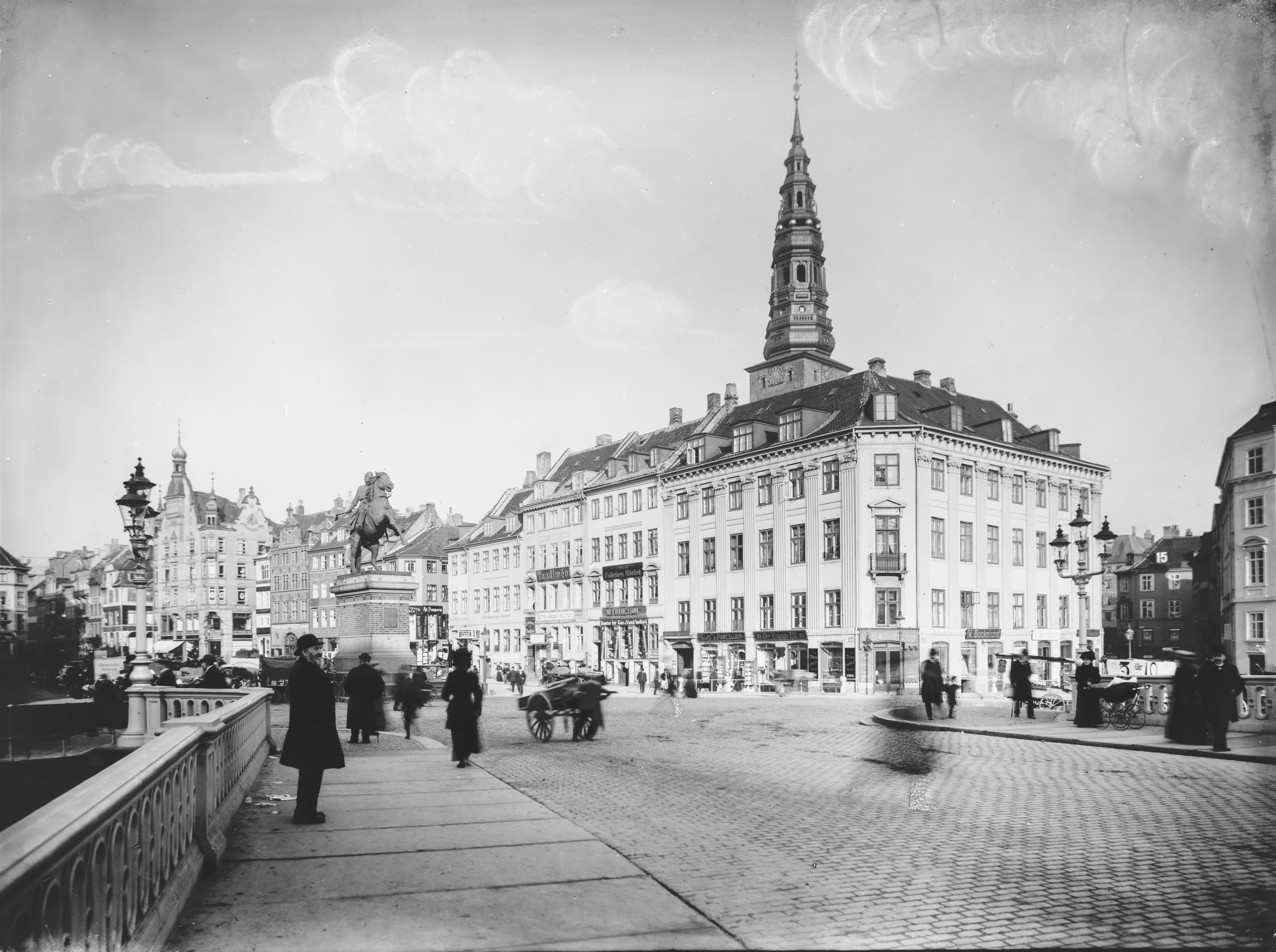
The Ploug House photographed from Højbro Bridge by Johannes Hauerslev

Carl Ploug purchased the property from Melchior circa 1862. The Melchior family remained on the second floor while Ploug moved in with his family on the third floor. Melchior's unmarried daughter Louise Melchior continued to live in the house until her death in 1934.

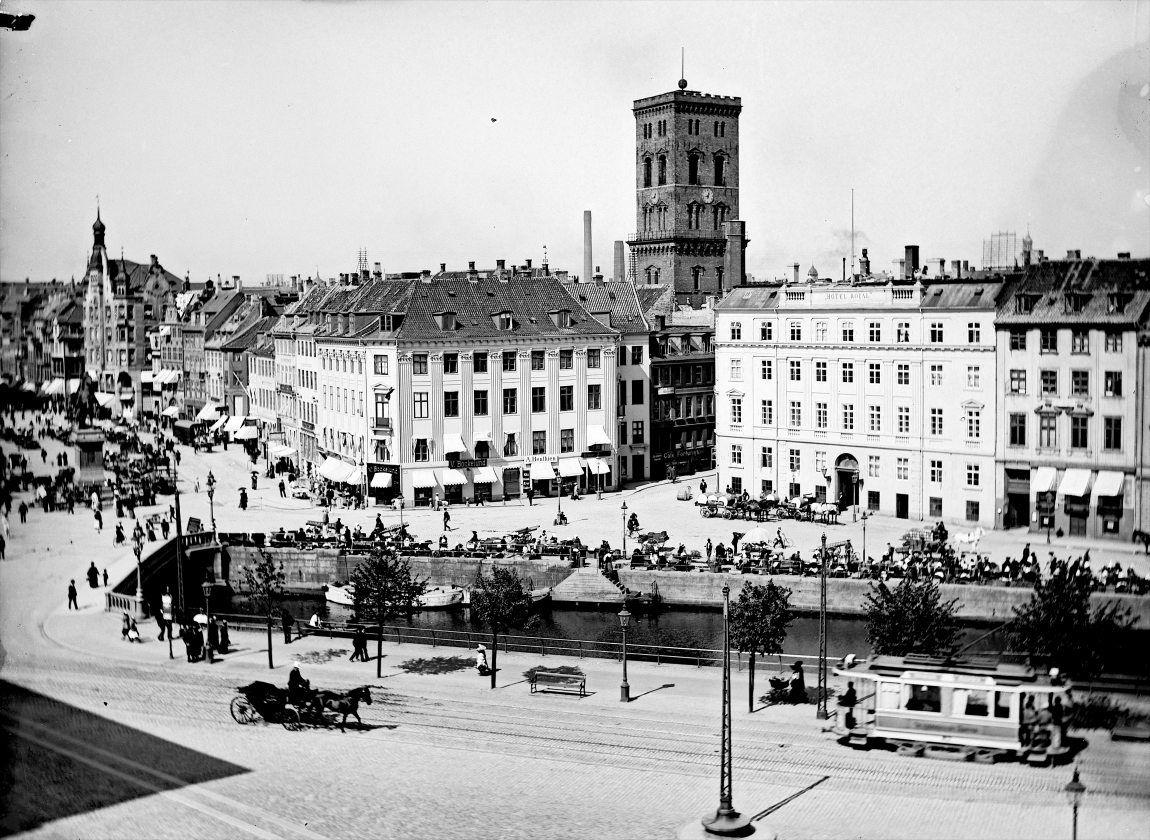
The Ploug House in 1908

Ploug also started to publish Fædrelandet from the building, which now also became known as Fædrelandets Hus (The Fatherland Building). Jens Giødwad, one of Ploug's colleagues from the newspaper, was also a resident in the building from 1864 to 1869.

The tobacco manufacturer Heinrich Hirschsprung, the owner of A.M. Hirschsprung & Sønner, lived with his family in one of the apartments facing Højbro Plads from 1872 to 1880. Hirschspring was the owner of a large art collection and his home was frequented by artists such as Vilhelm Marstrand, Peder Severin Krøyer, Vermehren and Anna and Michael Ancher.

The painter Erik Henningsen lived on the third floor at Højbro Plads 21 from 1913 to 1915. The Plougs owned the property for more than 50 years.

The seed company Hjalmar Hartmann & Co. was based in the building (No. 21) in 1995.

== Architecture ==
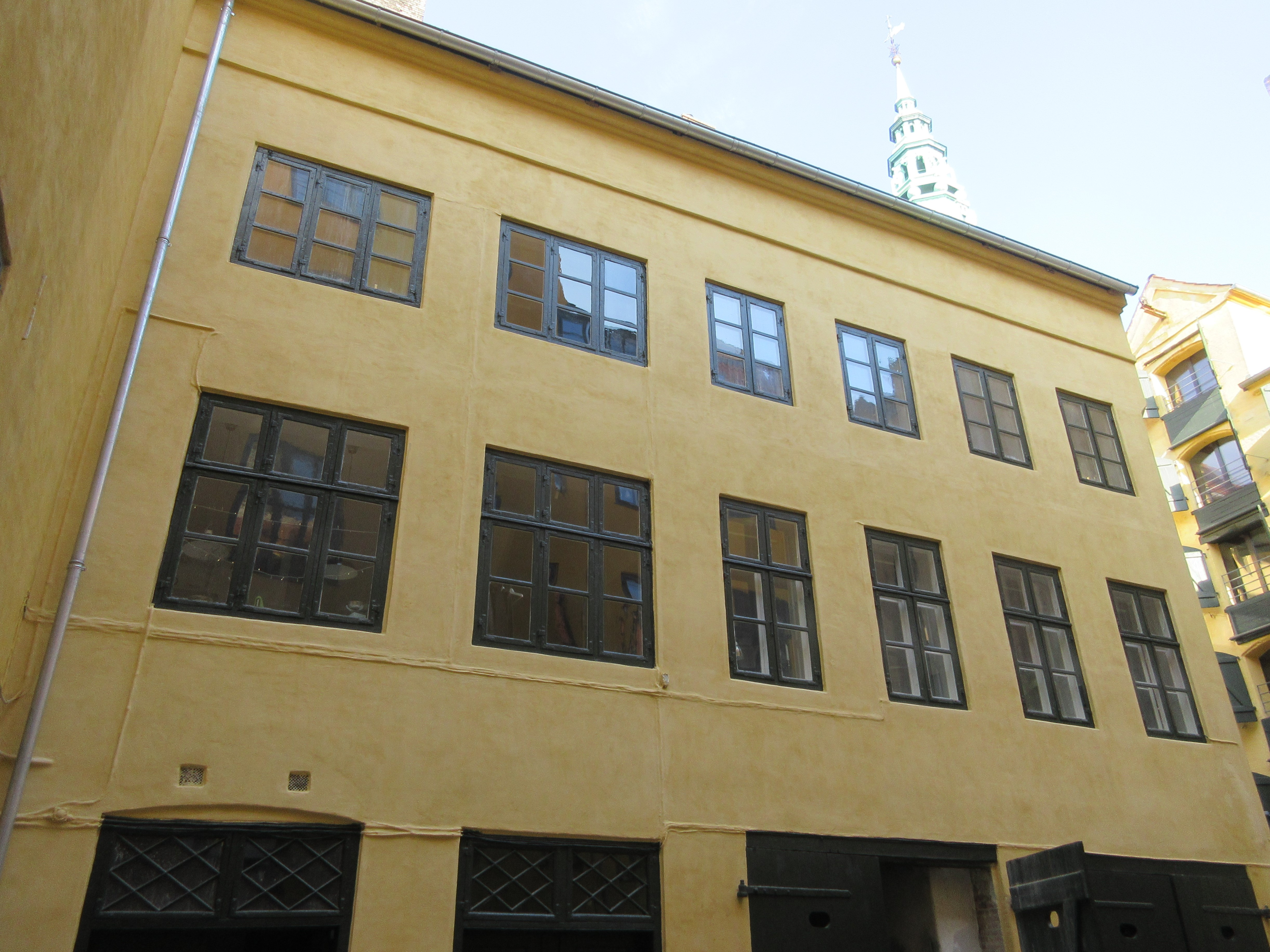
No. 21A

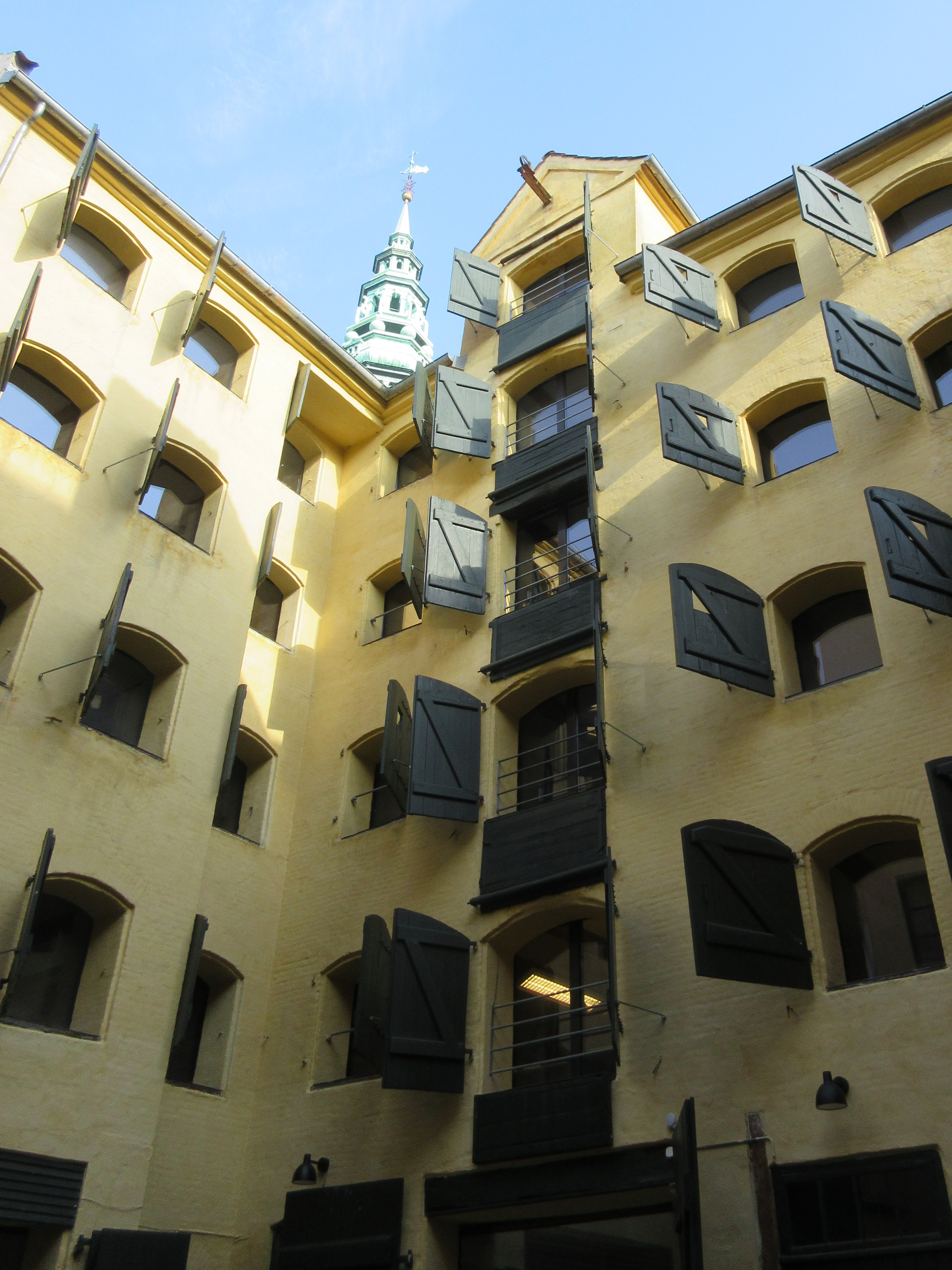
No. 21B

The house is designed in the Neoclassical style. It consists of four storeys and a cellar and has six bays towards Højbro Plads and seven towards Ved Stranden. The facade is decorated with pilasters. The "bevel" corner is typical for the buildings of the period, being a requirement under the new building regulations to facilitate the fire corps' passage through the city in the event of fire.

== Today ==
The complex consists of a combination of offices and housing. Vica Wood, a manufacturer of flooring, is based at No. 21 B.

== See also ==
- Collin House
