= 1913 in Denmark =

- Decades: 1890s; 1900s; 1910s; 1920s; 1930s
- See also: Other events of 1913; List of years in Denmark

Events from the year 1913 in Denmark.

== Incumbents ==
- Monarch – Christian X
- Prime minister – Klaus Berntsen (until 21 June), Carl Theodor Zahle

== Events ==
August

- 23 August – The Little Mermaid is inaugurated at its current location off Langelinie in Copenhagen.

October

- c. 7 October – The aviator Tlrik Birch crashes with his aircraft Ørnen at Kløvermarken on Amager and dies from his injuries just a few days later.

December

- 2 December – Karen Blixen leaves her native Rungstedlund and Denmark to settle in Kenya where she will live for the next almost 28 years on her African farm.

== Sports ==
- 31 August – Thorvald Ellegaard wins silver in men's sprint at the 1901 UCI Track Cycling World Championships.
- 2 November – Boldklubben 1913 is founded.

=== Date unknown ===
- Kjøbenhavns Boldklub wins the first Danish National Football Tournament by defeating Boldklubben af 1901 6–2 in the final.

== Births ==
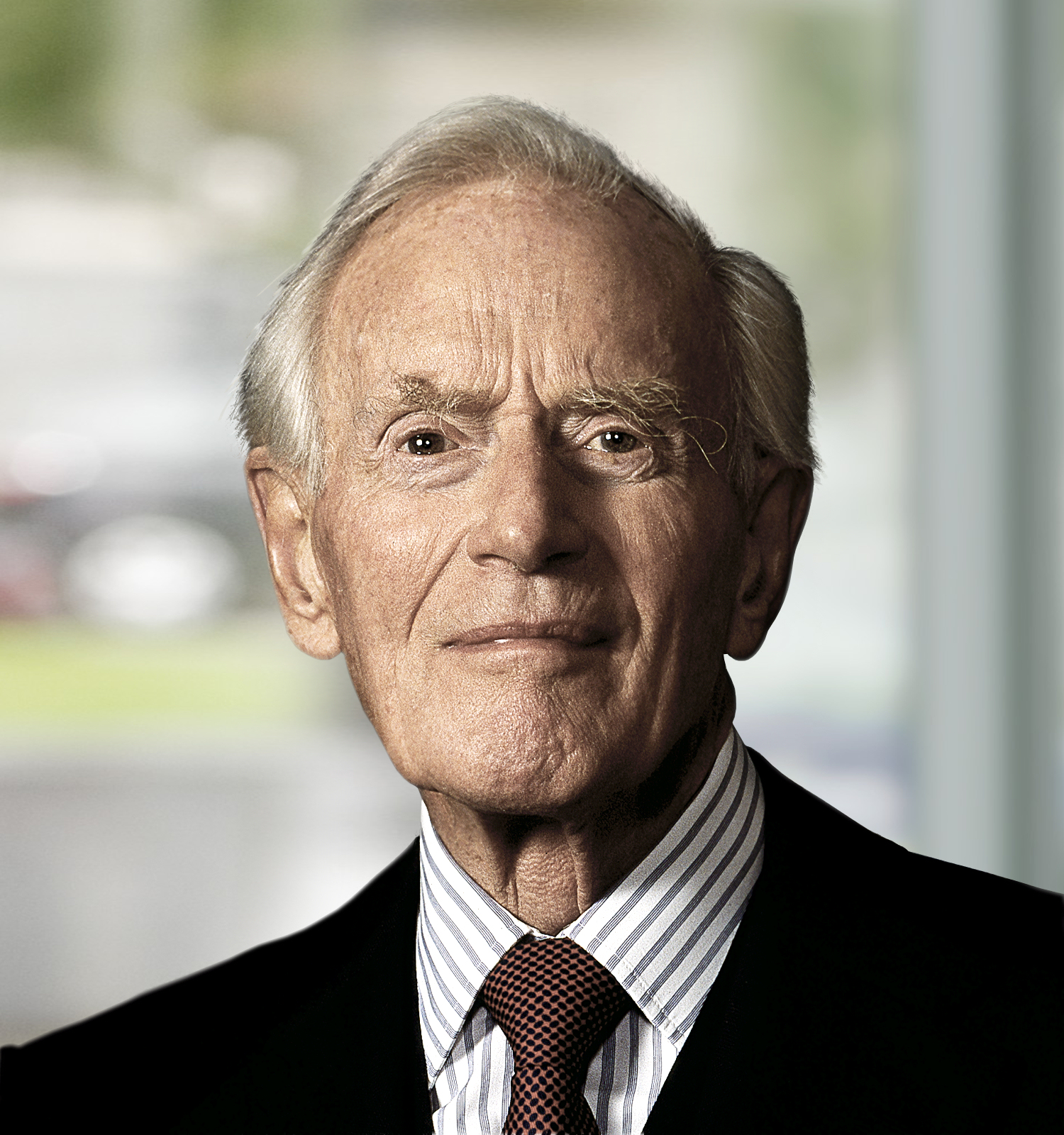
Mærsk Mc-Kinney Møller

=== January–March ===
- 11 January – Karl Stegger, actor (died 1980)
- 2 February – Poul Reichhardt, actor (died 1985)
- 23 February – Gertrud Vasegaard, ceramist (died 2007)
- 27 February – Poul Hansen, politician (died 1966)

=== May–August ===
- 24 May – Haldor Topsøe, engineer (died 2013)

=== July–September ===
- 13 July – Mærsk Mc-Kinney Møller, shipping magnate (died 2012)
- 17 September – Jørgen Jersild, composer and music educator (died 2004)
- 23 September – Carl-Henning Pedersen, painter (died 2007)

=== October–December ===
- 6 October – Inga Arvad, journalist (died 1973)

== Deaths ==
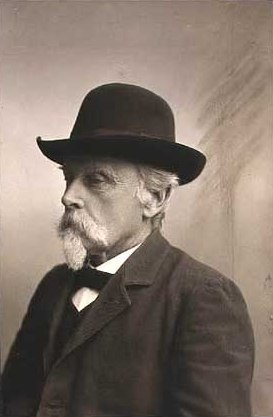
Jacob Kornerup.

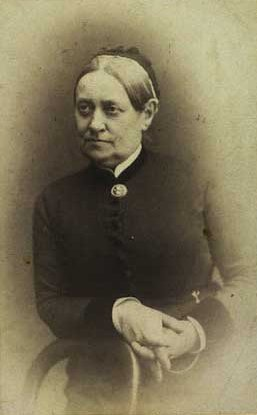
Natalie Zahle.

=== January–March ===
- 28 February – Johan Hansen, businessman (born 1838)
- 9 March – Jacob Kornerup, archeologist (born 1825)
- 19 March – Christian Zacho, painter (born 1843)

=== April–June ===
- 20 April – Vilhelm Bissen, sculptor (born 1836)
- 16 June – Frederikke Federspiel, photographer (born 1839)
- 26 June – Albert Jensen, architect (born 1847)

=== July–September ===
- 25 July – Peter Sabroe, politician (born 1867)
- 11 August
  - Natalie Zahle, reform pedagogue and pioneer on women's education (born 1827)
  - Johanne Fenger, composer (born 1836)

=== October–December ===
- 10 October – Ulrik Birch, aviator (born 1883)
- 24 December – J.B.S. Estrup, politician, prime minister of Denmark (born 1825)
