= Rolighed (Østerbro) =

Former country house in Østerbro, Copenhagen, Denmark

Coordinates: 55°42′14″N 12°35′04″E

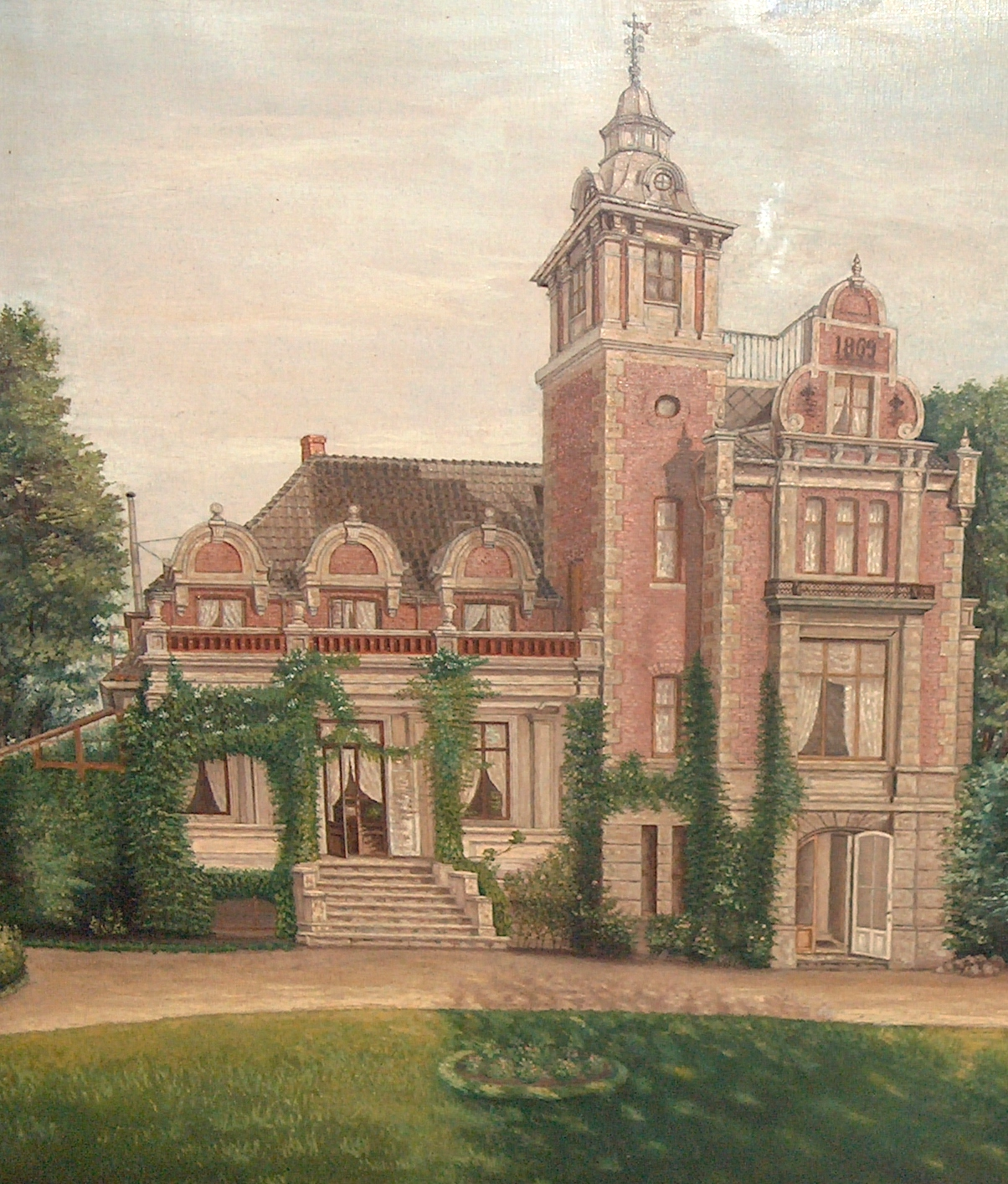
Rolighed after being rebuilt in 1869

Rolighed was a country house in what is now the Østerbro district of Copenhagen. As a regular guest of the Melchior family, Hans Christian Andersen died there in August 1875.

== History ==
=== Origins ===
Rolighed (the Danish word means "tranquility" or "calmness") built around 1800 as a one-storey house with a mansard roof in a large garden. The property was for a while owned by the military officer Johan Hendrik Hegermann-Lindencrone (1765–1849) and his wife Louise Hegermann-Lindencrone. They were known for hosting literary salons attended by some of the leading cultural figures of the Danish Golden Age. Johan Hendrik Hegermann-Lindencrone died at Rolighed in 1849.

=== Melchior family and Hans Christian Andersen ===
Jewish merchant Moritz G. Melchior and his wife Dorothea acquired it as a summer residence in the 1850s. In 1869, they had it completely rebuilt in the Dutch Renaissance or Christian IV style of Rosenborg Castle with a tower and rounded Dutch gables.

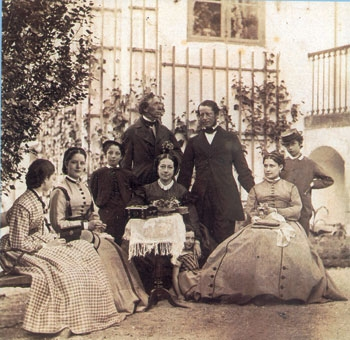
Andersen at Rolighed: Israel Melchior (c. 1867)

Moritz and Dorothea Melchior entertained a variety of famous guests from the late 1850s when the family business really began to prosper. The most famous of these were certainly Hans Christian Andersen who was a frequent visitor, first in their home on Højbro Plads then increasingly at Rolighed where, in 1866, he was given his own room with a balcony overlooking the Øresund.

Moritz' brother Israel, a keen amateur photographer, was also a frequent visitor. Andersen, who was interested in photography himself, and he became good friends with the result that Israel took many photographs of family gatherings at Rolighed together with Andersen.

Andersen had become increasingly ill after a fall in 1872. He relied increasingly on the care the Melchiors gave him, spending long periods at Rolighed. On 12 June 1875, he arrived there for the last time. A week later he was no longer able to write his diary which instead he dictated to the Melchiors and their children. At 11 a.m. on 4 August, he died peacefully in his bed.

== Commemorative plaque ==
The house was demolished in 1898 to be replaced by today's apartment building. A plaque has been erected, commemorating Andersen's place of death. It contains two lines from a short poem by Andersen, testifying to his feelings for Rolighed:

Mit hjem i Hjemmet, hvor bag Hyldens Hang
mit Liv fik Solskin og min Harpe Klang

which can be translated into English as:

My home in the home, behind the elderflower
Gave sunshine to my life and made my harp ring

== See also ==
- Israel B. Melchior
- Rosenvænget
