= Israel B. Melchior =

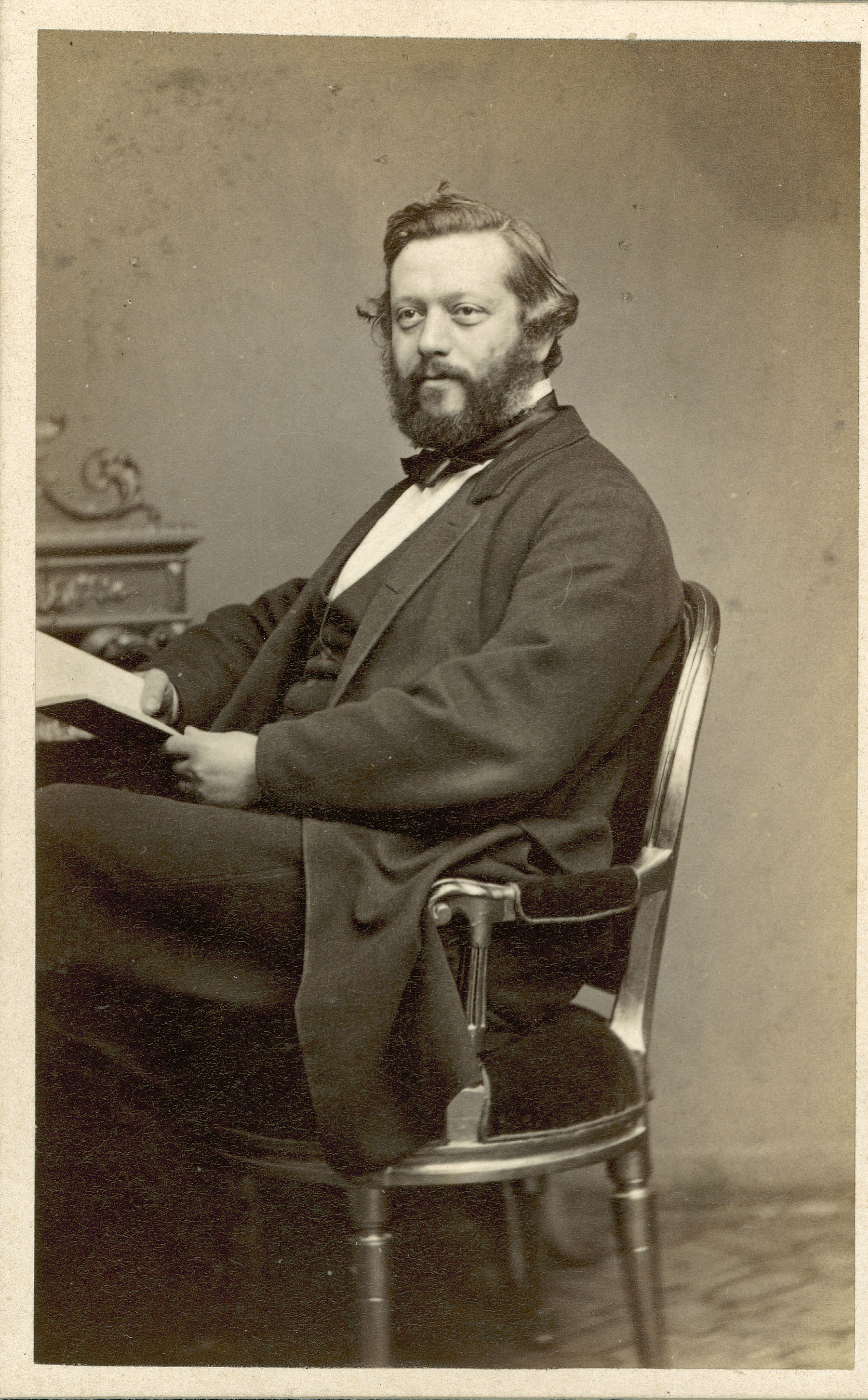
Israel B. Melchior

Israel Berendt Melchior (12 May 1827 – 7 September 1893) was a Danish engineer, manufacturer, and amateur photographer. He is especially remembered for his photographs of the renowned author Hans Christian Andersen.

== Career ==
Born on 12 May 1827, Israel Berendt Melchior trained as a civil engineer. In 1874, he purchased the Valdemarshaab paper factory, located just north of Køge, for 60,000 kroner after it had gone bankrupt following a flood in 1872. By 1875, Melchior had fully renovated the factory and constructed Søvang, a large Italian-style director's residence adjacent to the site. However, in October of that same year, the factory was completely destroyed by fire and was never rebuilt.

Melchior lived in the villa from 1875 to 1884 with his wife (and cousin) Johanne Melchior (1848–1911), with whom he had four children. Known for their hospitality, the couple frequently hosted social gatherings, sometimes organizing soirées and short plays in their home.

== Amateur photographer ==
Melchior was an enthusiastic amateur photographer. When constructing Søvang, he specifically designed the upper floor to include a large photographic studio with an overhead window and an east-facing glass wall to optimize natural light. He was particularly known for photographing annual family gatherings at Rolighed, the family mansion in Østerbro, near Copenhagen. These gatherings often included artists and writers, most notably Hans Christian Andersen, who became acquainted with the family in 1862 and visited frequently until his death in 1875. From 1867, Melchior captured several family group photographs with Andersen, as well as a number of portraits of the author.

== Gallery ==
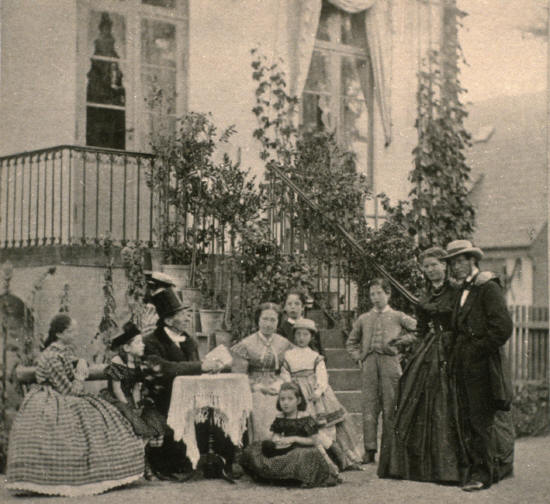
Israel Melchior: Family gathering at Rolighed in 1867 with Hans Christian Andersen (third from left)

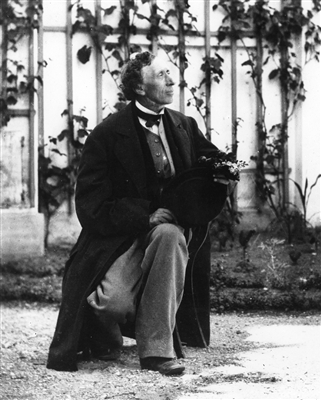
Israel Melchior: Hans Christian Andersen, portrait at Rolighed (1867)

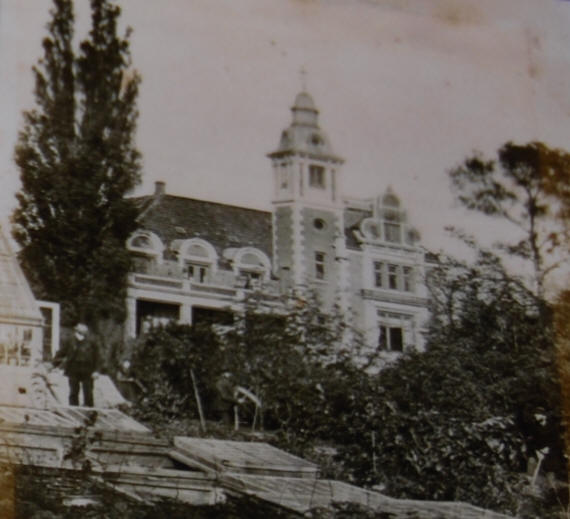
Israel Melchior: Rolighed, Østerbro

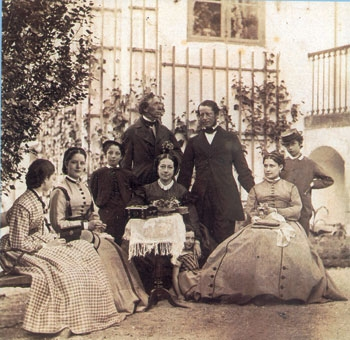
Israel Melchior: Family group at Rolighed with Hans Christian Andersen and Moritz G. Melchior
