= 1915 in Denmark =

- Decades: 1890s; 1900s; 1910s; 1920s; 1930s
- See also: Other events of 1915; List of years in Denmark

Events from the year 1915 in Denmark.

== Incumbents ==
- Monarch – Christian X
- Prime minister – Carl Theodor Zahle

== Events ==
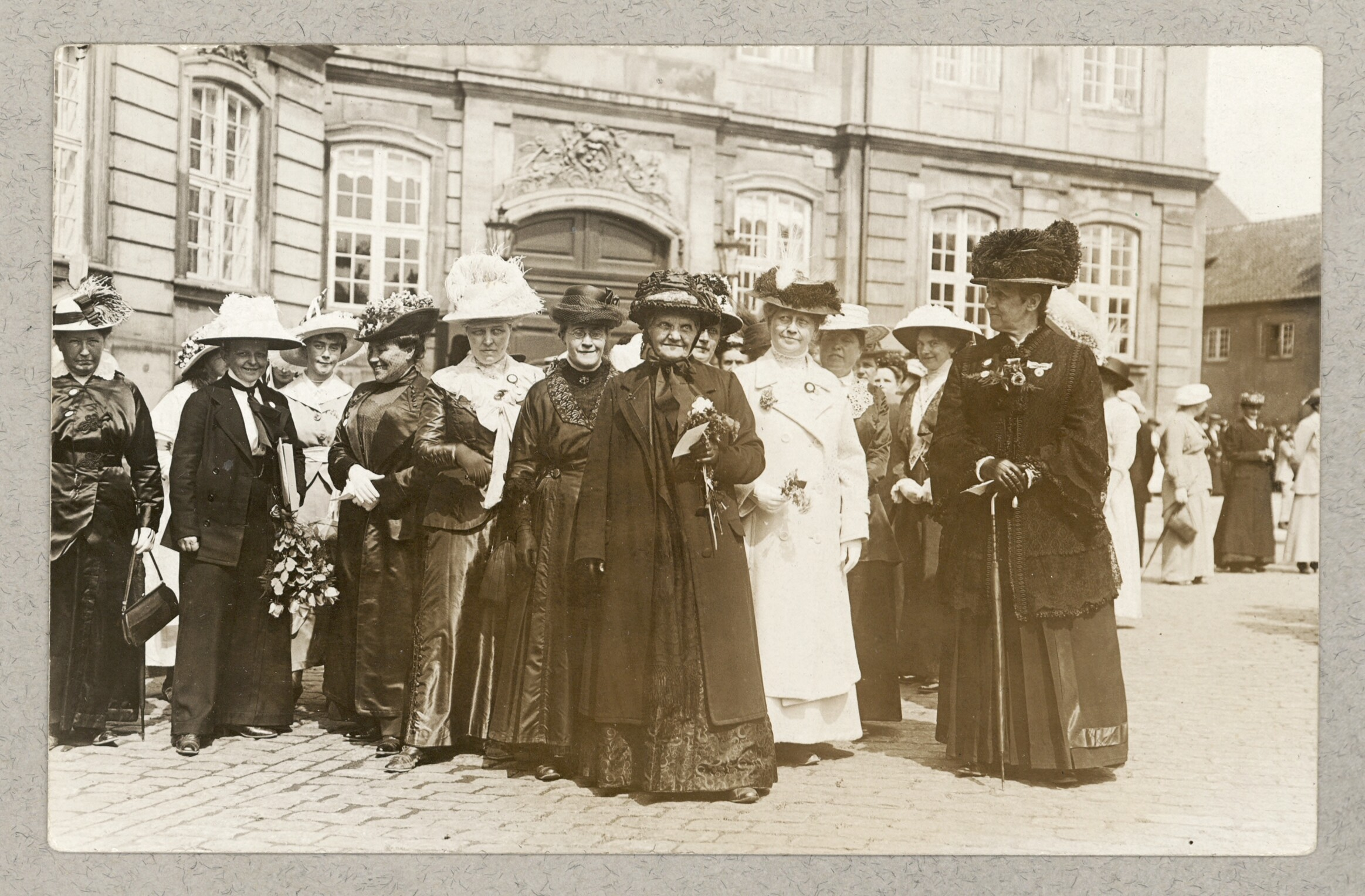
5 June: A deputation of women visits Amalienborg.

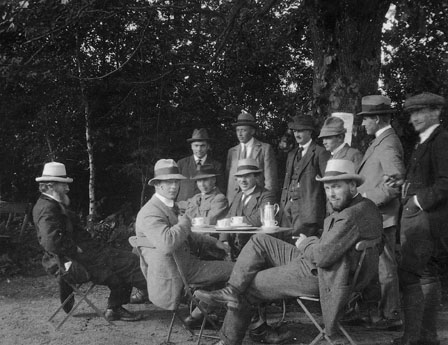
Some of the founders of the Society for Better Building Practices photographed during the founding meeting in Odense in June 1915

- 7 May – A Folketing election is held. As required to change the Constitution, the government called for the dissolution of both the Folketing and the Landsting in order for the new Rigsdag to be able to introduce the new constitution.
- 5 June – Women's suffrage is introduced in Denmark, women are given the right to vote in Rigsdag elections.
- 27 June – Bedre Byggeskik, a late Danish incarnation of the Arts and Crafts Movement, is founded at a meeting in Odense as a reaction against the impoverished state of Danish architecture which they found to be a consequence of the Historicist style which had dominated the past decades.

== Sports ==
- February – Boldklubben Skjold is founded.

== Births ==
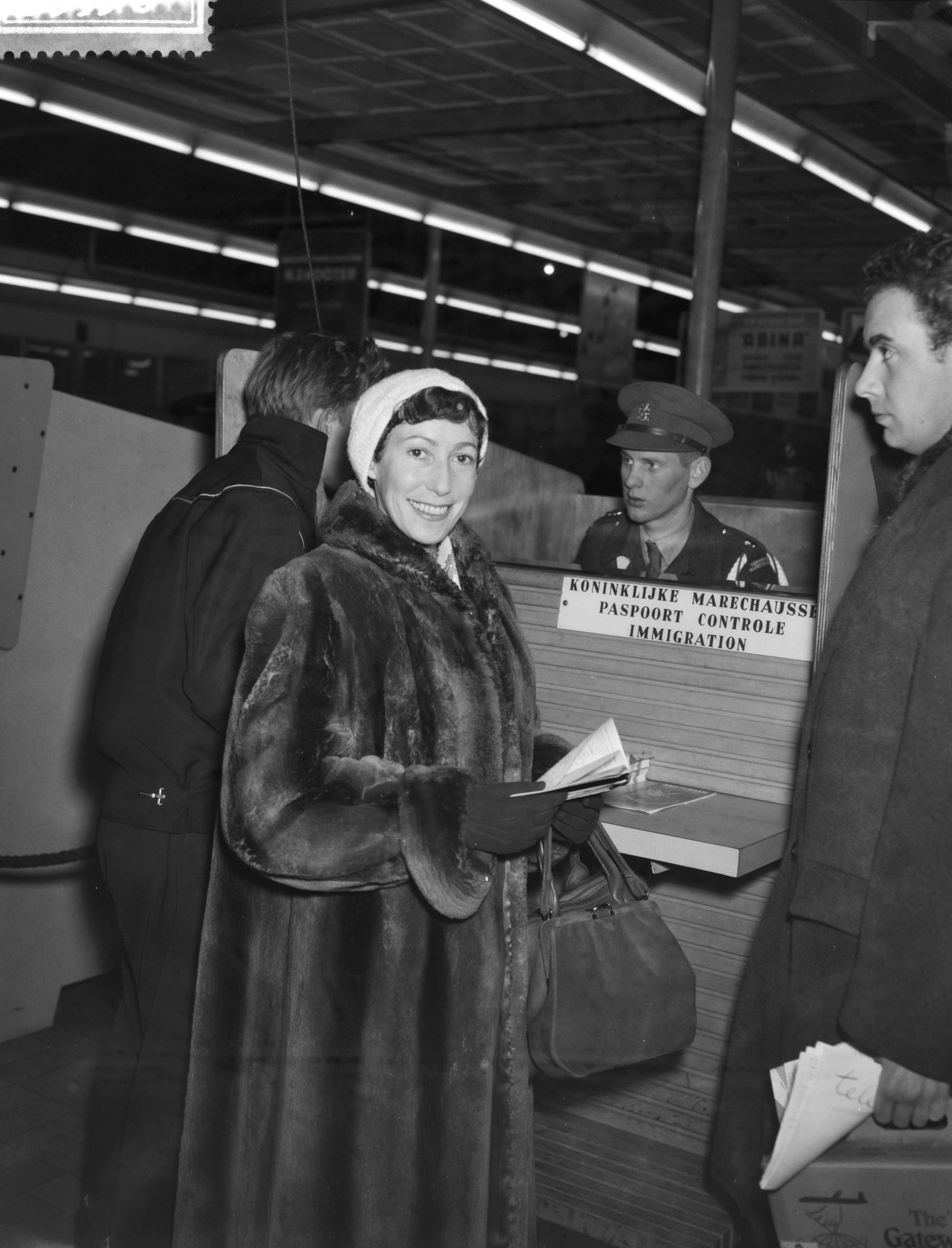
Raquel Rastenni.

=== January–March ===
- 22 January – Ole Berntsen, sailor (died 1996)
- 29 January – Halfdan Rasmussen, poet (died 2002)

=== July–September ===
- 21 August – Raquel Rastenni, singer (died 1998)
- 26 August – Niels Macholm, painter and graphic artist (died in 1997)
- 21 September – Hanne Budtz, politician and lawyer (died 2004)

=== October–December ===
- 12 December – Tobias Faber, architect (died 2010)

== Deaths ==
=== January–March ===
- 12 January – Caroline Hammer, photographer (born 1832)
- 13 January – Barclay Raunkiær, Arabia explorer, author (born 1889)
- 6 February – Niels Steenberg, engineer (born 1839)
- 9 March – Charlotte Klein, educator (born 1834)
- 11 March – Vilhelm Rosenstand, artist (born 1838)

=== July–September ===
- 8 September – Julius Villiam Gudmand-Høyer, author (born 1841)
- 11 September – Jens Birkholm, genre and landscape painter associated with the Funen Painters (born 1869)

=== October–December ===
- 26 November – Jacob Scavenius. landowner and politician (born 1838)
- 4 December – Anton Hegner, musician and composer (died 1861)
- 20 December – Carl Locher, painter (born 1851)
