= Moritz G. Melchior =

Jewish-Danish businessman (1816–1884)

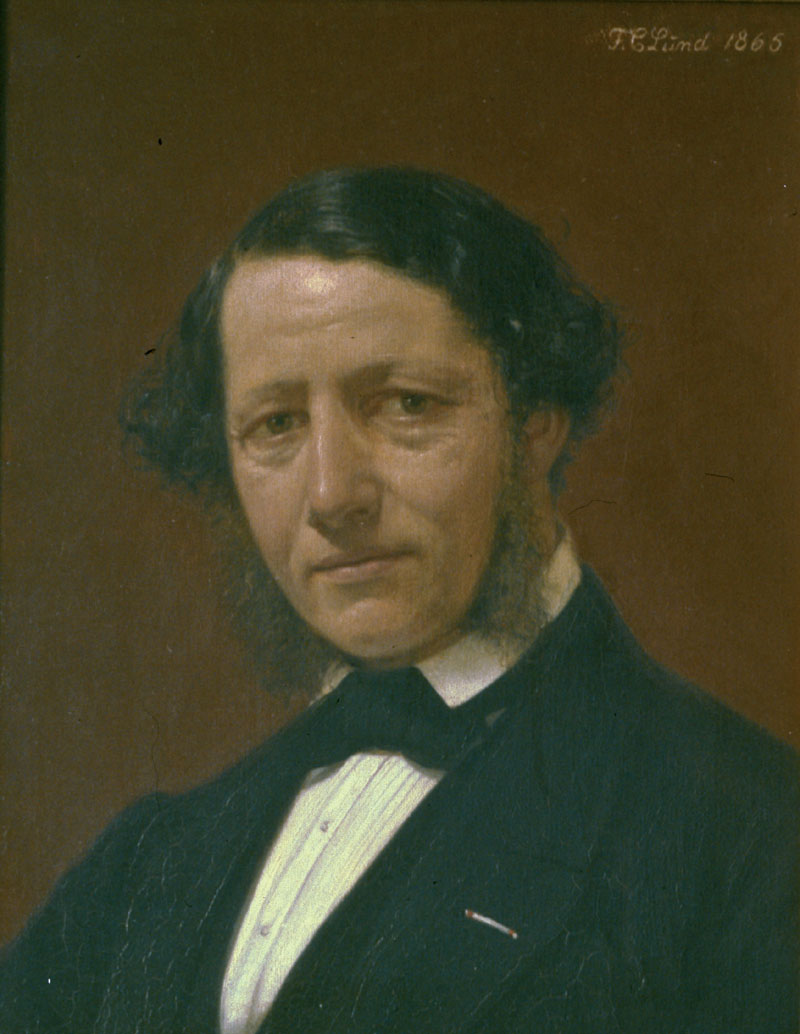
- Melchior painted by F. C. Lund in 1865
- Born: 22 June 1816; Copenhagen, Denmark
- Died: 10 September 1884 (aged 68); Copenhagen, Denmark
- Occupations: Merchant and ship-owner
- Awards: Order of the Dannebrog

Moritz Gerson Melchior (22 June 1816 – 19 September 1884) was a Jewish-Danish businessman. He headed the trading house Moses & Søn G. Melchior from 1845. He owned the property at Ploug House at Højbro Plads 21 in Copenhagen as well as the country house Rolighed. Moritz G. Melchior and his wife Dorothea Melchior were some of Hans Christian Andersen's closest friends in the later part of his life.

== Early life and education ==
Melchior was born into a wealthy Jewish family in Copenhagen, the son of Gerson Moses Melchior (1771–1845) by his second wife Birgitte (Jette) Melchior née Israel (1792–1855). His father was part of the second generation in the trading house Moses & Søn G. Melchior, founded by Moses Marcus Melchior. The family resided at Amagertorv 11. His father had bought the building in c. 1810.

== Career ==
Melchior joined the family firm just after his Bar Mitzvah at the age of 13. It had initially specialised in the import of tobacco from the Netherlands and Bremen but later engaged in trade in the Danish West Indies. Two elder brothers joined the company but died in 1834 and 1843. Moritz G. Melchior joined the company in 1840 and became its sole owner upon his father's death in 1845. His younger brother Moses Melchior became a partner in the company in 1850.

== Public life ==
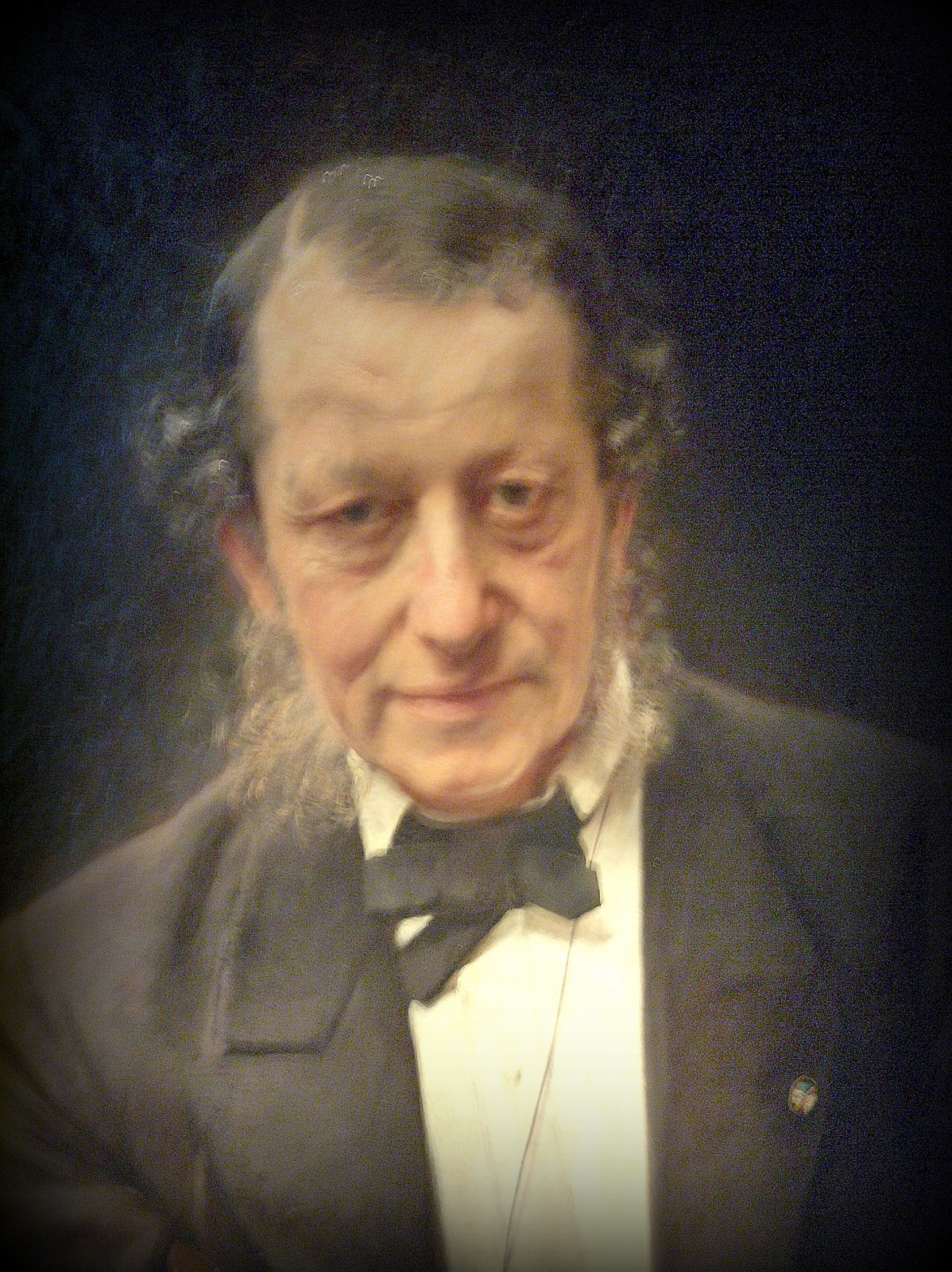
An aging Melchior painted by Bertha Wegmann

Melchior was elected to the board of representatives of the Jewish community in Copenhagen and served as its president in 1852–1853. He was also a member of Grosserer-Societetet's governing committee and served as its president from 1873 to 1884. He was a member of the Maritime and Commercial Court (Sø- og handelsretten) from 1862 to 1883 and of the Copenhagen City Council from 1851 to 1869. He was elected to the Port Council in 1859 and remained a member even after leaving the city council. He was also involved in reorganizing the Copenhagen Police Force with inspiration from England.

Melchior was elected to Landstinget (Parliament) from 1866 to 1874. He was a co-founder of Frihandelsforenignen (Free Trade Society) in 1861 but left the organisation fairly early. He was a co-founder of Privatbanken in 1857 and served as vice chairman of its board from 1876.

== Property ==
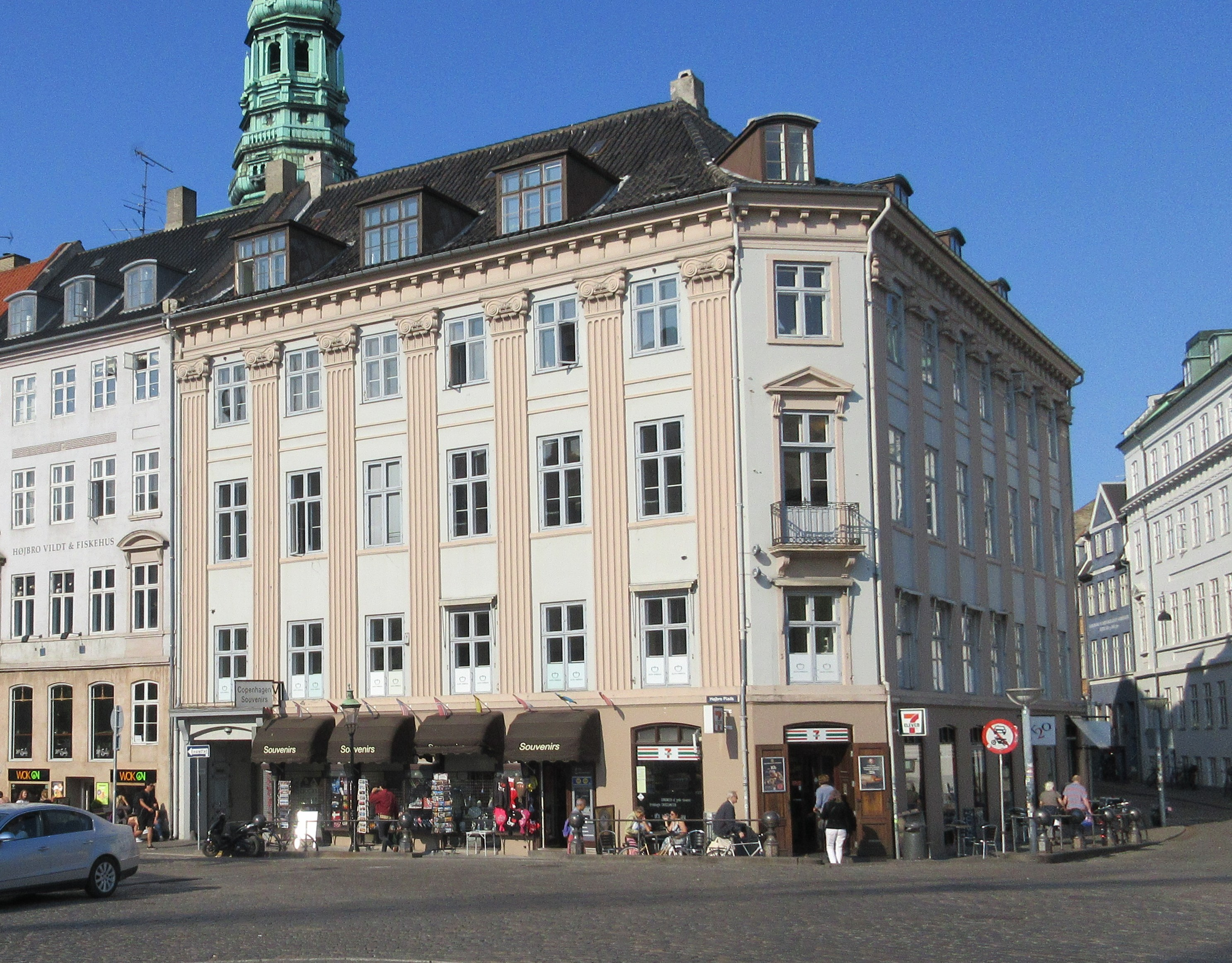
The Ploug House today

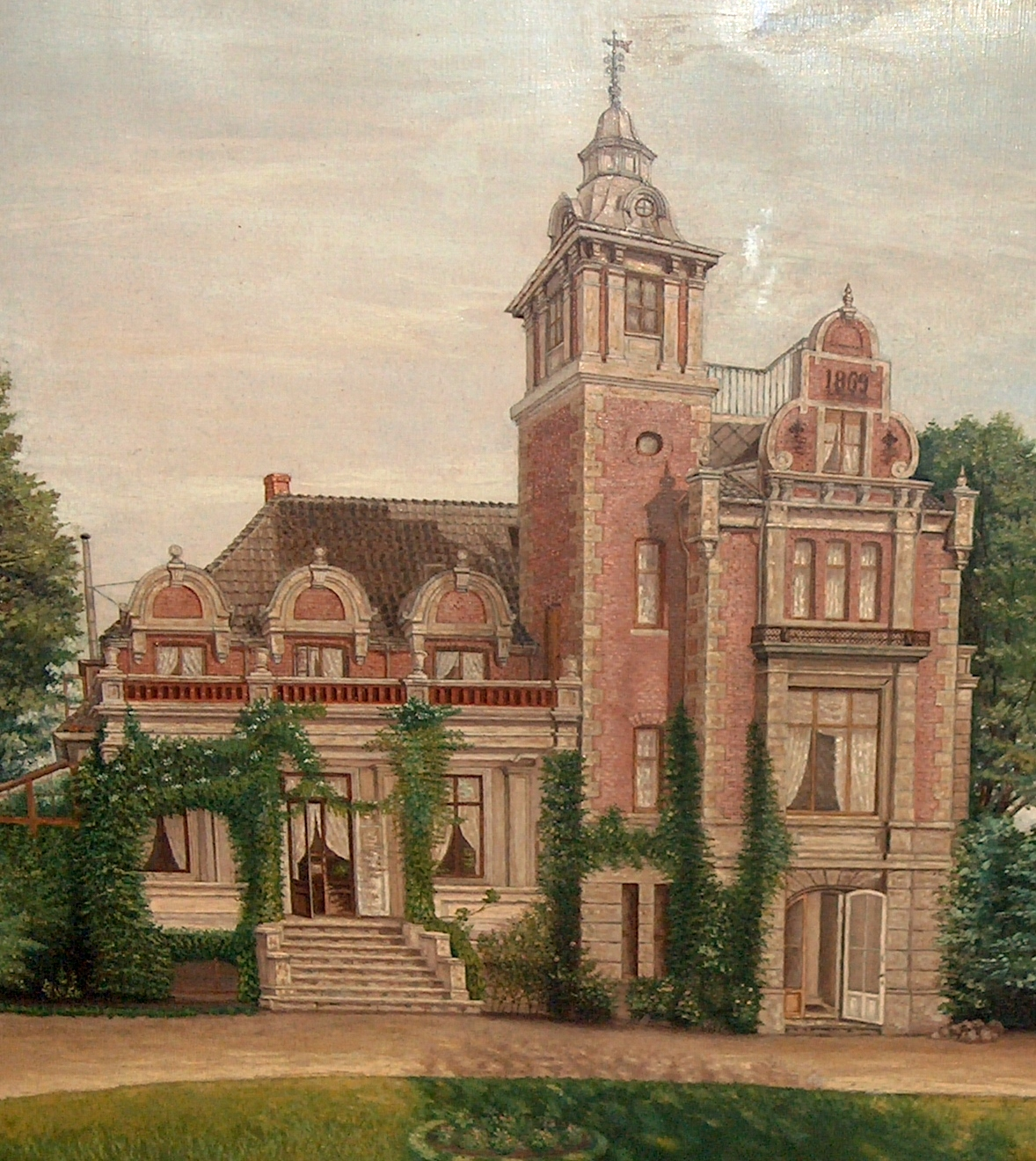
Rolighed after the expansion

Melchior acquired the building at Højbro Plads 21 in 1855. The building is from 1798 and was designed by Andreas Hallander. It is now known as the Ploug House after a later owner. Melchior lived with his family in the apartment on the second floor and also operated his company from the complex.

Melchior also acquired the country house Rolighed in Østerbro in 1858. In 1869–1870, it was subject to a major expansion in Renaissance Revival style. The building was demolished in 1898.

== Personal life ==
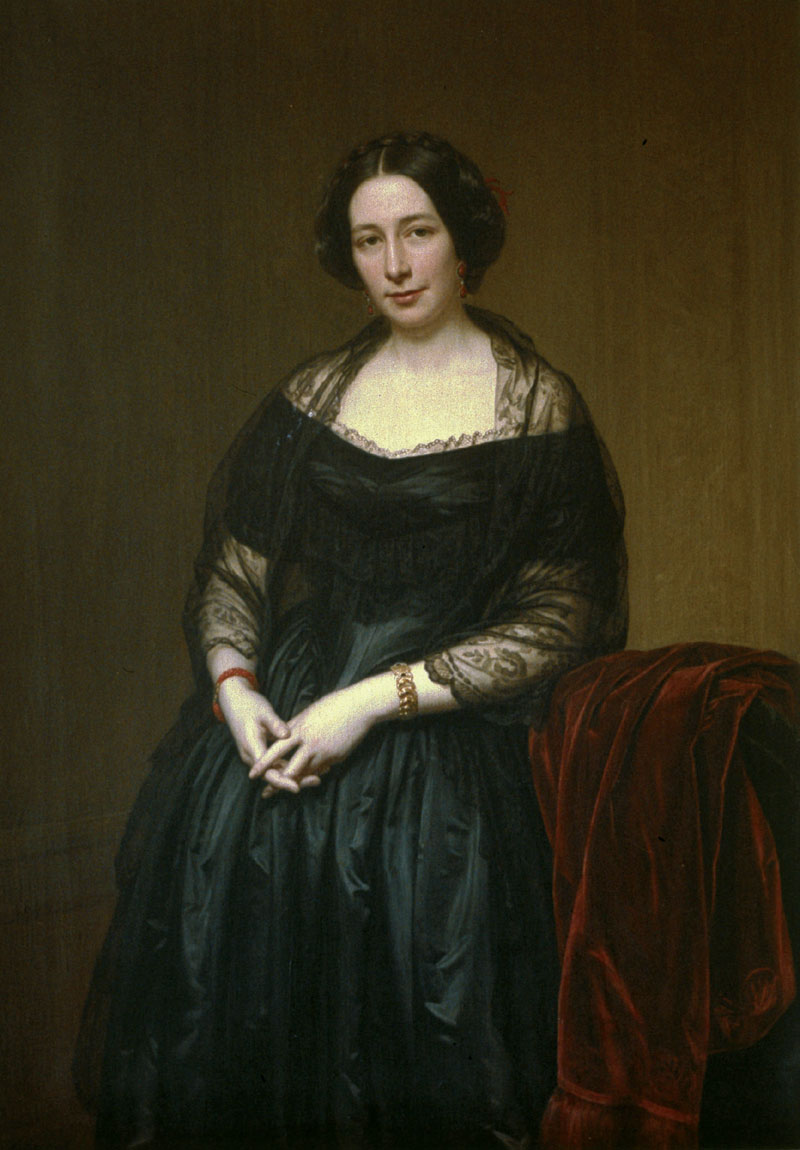
Dorothea Melchior

Melchior married (Deiche) Dorothea Henriques (16 February 1823 – 16 February 1885) on 17 June 1846 in the Synagogue in Copenhagen. She was a daughter of broker Ruben Henriques (1771–1846) and (Jeruchine) Josika Melchior (1784–1857).

Moritz G. Melchior and Dorothea Melchior had eight children of which four died as infants:

- William Melchior (1847–1856)
- Johanne Melchior (1848–1911)
- Louise Melchior (1849–1935)
- Harriet Melchior (1851–1917)
- Anna Melchior (1853–1881)
- Carl Henriques Melchior (1855–1931)
- Emil Melchior (1857–1881)
- Thea Melchior (1860–1876)

Hans Christian Andersen was a close friend of the family from circa 1859. Andersen stayed with the family from 13 March until 21 May 1870 in their residence on Højbro Plads, where he wrote What the Whole Family Said, and the Melchiors also hosted the celebration of his 70th birthday. He spent his last year at Rolighed where he died on 4 August 1875.

== Legacy ==
Melchiors Plads, located close to Melchior's now demolished country house Rolighed, is named after him. A plaque on Kalkbrænderi Vej 16 commemorates that Hans Christian Andersen died at the site.
