= 1843 in Denmark =

- Decades: 1820s; 1830s; 1840s; 1850s; 1860s
- See also: Other events of 1843; List of years in Denmark

Events from the year 1843 in Denmark.

== Incumbents ==
- Monarch – Christian VIII
- Prime minister – Poul Christian Stemann

== Events ==
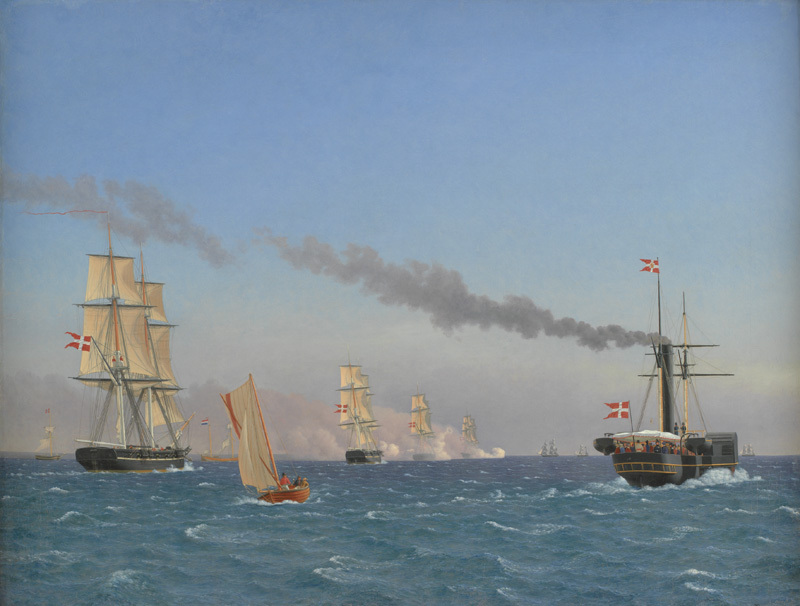
2 May: Christian VIII witnesses the maneuvre of a squadron off Copenhagen from his steam ship Ægir.

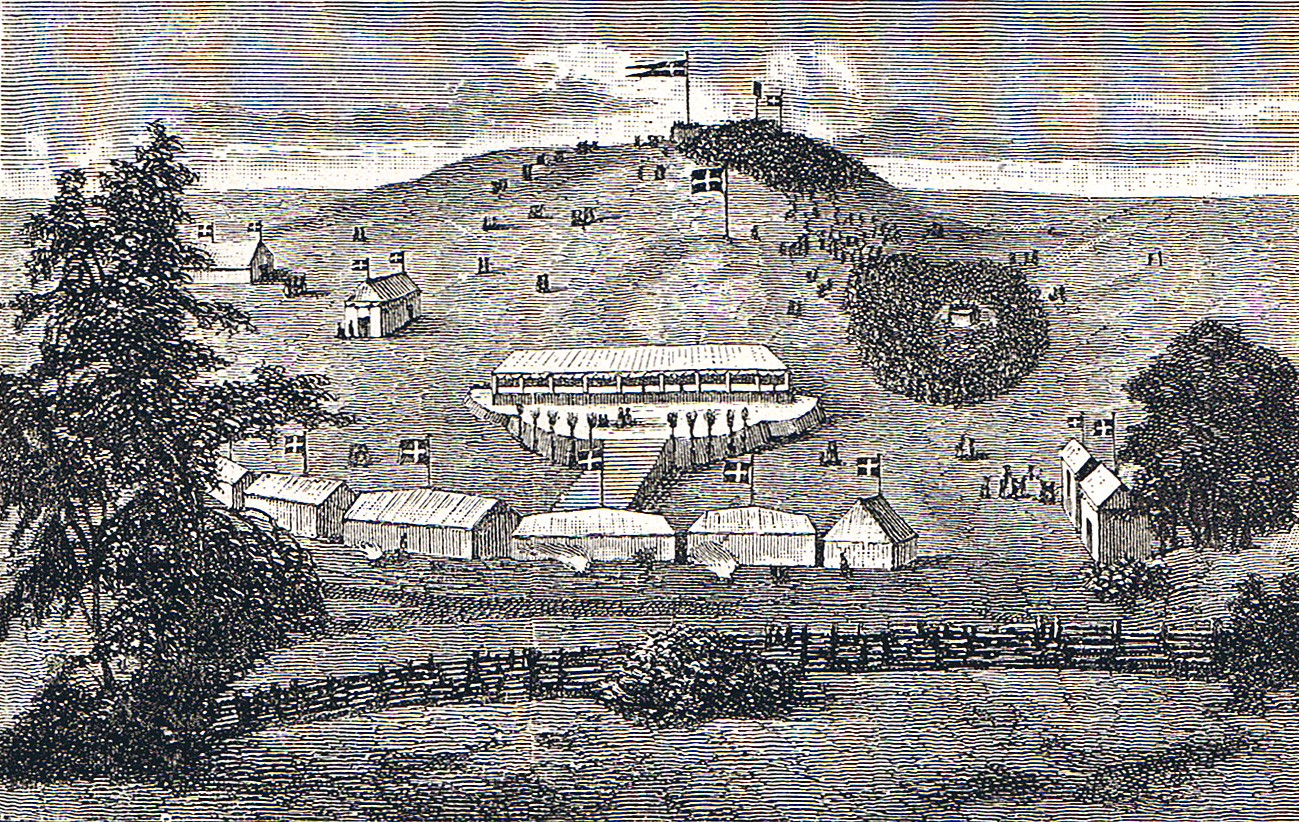
18 May:The first rally at Skamlingsbanken

- 18 May – first public meeting at Skamlingsbanken.
- 16 August – Georg Carstensen Tivoli Gardens in Copenhagen are inaugurated with 3,615 visitors on the opening day. At the end of the 1843 season, more than 175,000 guests have visited the park.
- 15 December – The Barony of Adelersborg is established by G.F.O. Zytphen-Adeler and Bertha Henriette Frederikke Løvenskiold from the manors of Dragsholm and Dønnerup.

== Culture ==
=== Literature ===
- 20 February – Søren Kierkegaard publishes Either/Or,

== Births ==
=== January–March ===
- 7 January – Erhard Frederiksen, agriculturalist (died 1903)
- 24 January – Evald Tang Kristensen, author and folklore collector (died 1929)
- 25 February – Christian Ditlev Ammentorp Hansen, pharmacist and industrialist (died 1916)
  - 11 March – Harald Høffding, philosopher and theologian (died 1031)
- 31 March
  - Christian Zacho, painter (died 1913)
  - Kristian Zahrtmann, painter (died 1917)

=== April–June ===
- 8 April – Asger Hamerik, composer (died 1923)
- 3 June – King Frederick VIII (died 1912)

=== July–September ===
- 28 August – Peder Madsen, theologian and bishop (died 1911)

=== October–December ===
- 9 October – Christian Christiansen, physicist (died 1917)
- 7 November – Emil Vett, businessman (died 1911)

== Deaths ==
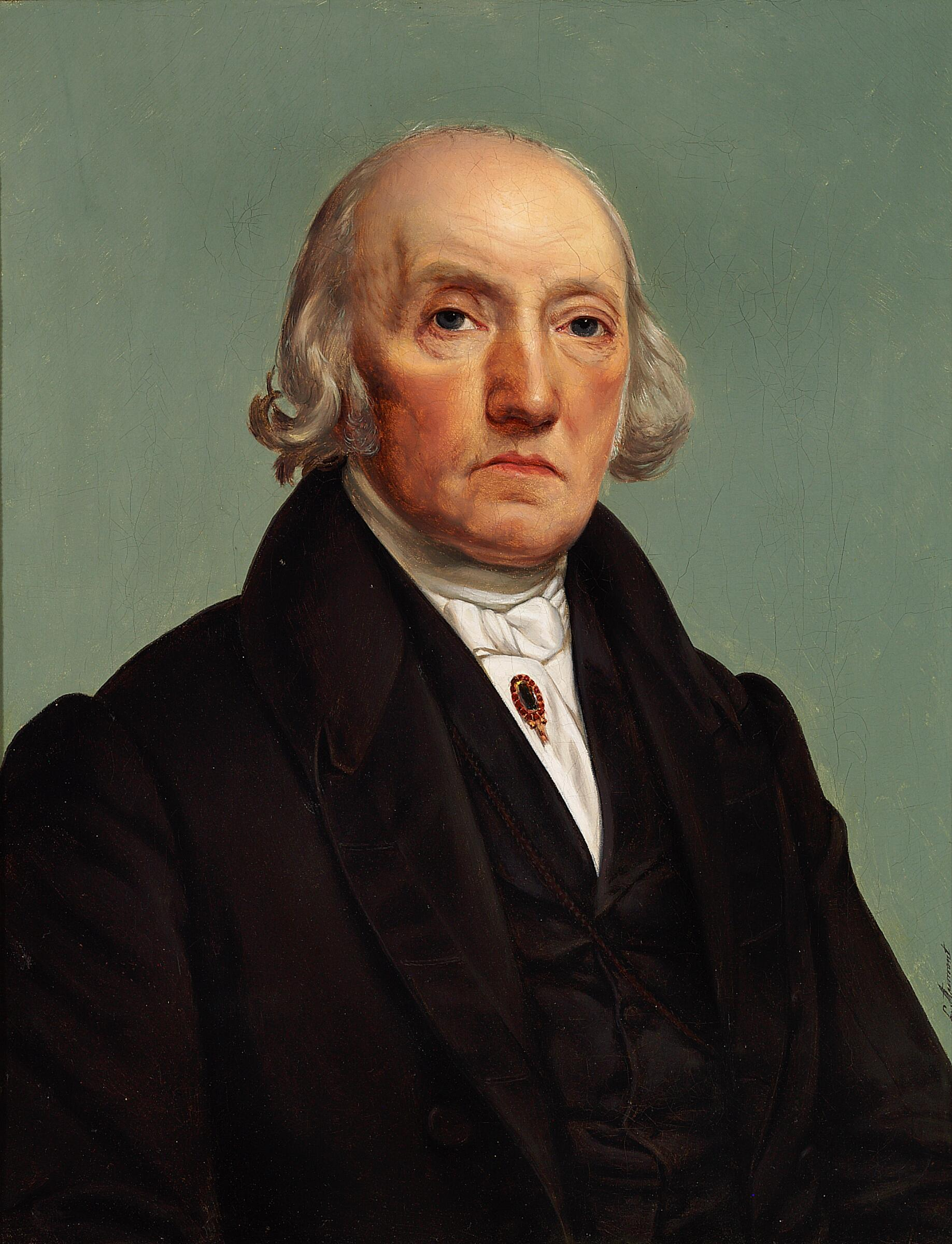
Antoine Bournonville.

- 11 January – Antoine Bournonville, ballet master (born 1760 in France)
- 13 January – Princess Louise Auguste, princess of Denmark, Duchess of Augustenborg (born 1771)
