= Therese Brummer =

Danish writer (1833–1896)

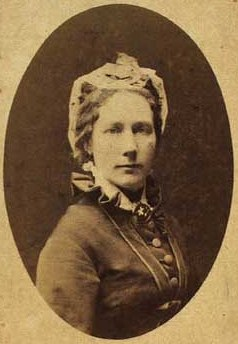
Therese Brummer

Therese Conradine Brummer née Casse (1833–1896) was a Danish writer who frequently used the pen name Fru Elisabeth. She is remembered above all for the stories she wrote first for small children and later for teenagers. Her works for adults include two biographies as well as fictional works and a collection of short stories.

== Early life, education and family ==
Born in Copenhagen on 8 June 1833, Therese Conradine Casse was the daughter of the politician Andreas Lorentz Casse (1803–86) and his wife Andrea Severine, née Engelbreth. She enjoyed an excellent education in her well-to-do home, which was supplemented by contacts with many learned celebrities. In May 1861, she married Captain Nicolai Abraham Brummer (1822–1903), with whom she had two children: Agnete (1862) and Lilly (1868).

== Professional life ==
It was not until she was about 50 that Brummer began to take a serious interest in writing. She was particularly successful in writing fairy tales for small children but also wrote adventure stories for teenagers and young adults. From 1887 to 1893 she wrote three novels for adults under the pen name Fru Elisabeth: Virkelighedsbilleder (Pictures of Reality, 1887), Som man gifter sig (As One Marries, 1888) and En Kamp (A Fight, 1893). Here she draws on her own experience of family relationships addressing the problems of marriage and motherhood but adding a new, more modern dimension in which the influence of a strongly motivated woman is addressed. Her skills in this respect were not however recognized by the critics of the day.

Therese Brummer died in Hillerød on 14 March 1896.
