= Louise Hegermann-Lindencrone =

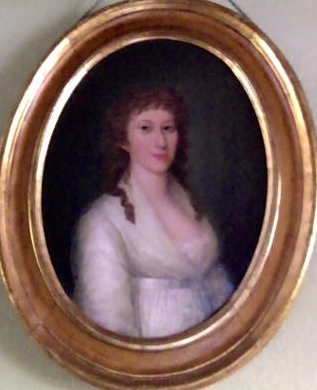
Portrait of Louise Hegermann-Lindencrone

Mette Louise Christiane Frederikke Hegermann-Lindencrone (1778–1853) was an aristocratic Danish writer who is remembered for her dramas Eleonora Christina Uhlfeldt and Troubadouren as well as for a collection of short stories which included her best work, the crime story Faster Dorothea (Aunt Dorothea) which was also published in German and English. She and her husband Hendrik held salons in their Copenhagen home, attracting celebrated literary and cultural figures including Adam Oehlenschläger and Bernhard Severin Ingemann. Her works and correspondence focused on the social status of women and the opportunities they were offered.

== Biography ==
Born on 4 December 1778 in Copenhagen, Mette Louise Christiane Frederikke Lindencrone was the daughter of the estate owner and later kammerherre Johan Frederik Lindencrone til Gjorslev (1746–1817) and his wife Bolette Marie née Harboe (1750–1800). Of the family's six children, she was the only one to reach adulthood. On 26 May 1797, she married the army officer and later lieutenant general Johan Hendrik Hegermann-Lindencrone (1765–1849) with whom she had nine children.

Encouraged as a child to take an interest in art and literature, when she was 15 she published poetry in journals. While bringing up the children, Louise Hegermann-Lindencrone lived in Copenhagen's Kastellet Fortress where her husband trained his troops. They also made a home in Villa Rolighed in present-day Østerbro, where they invited cultural and literary celebrities to their salons.

She published her three main works under her own name. Eleonora Christa Uhlfeldt (1817), Troubadouren (1820) and Danske Fortellinger (1825), a collection of short stories. All her works are written in a historical context but all reflect concern for the social status enjoyed by women and the opportunities they are offered. Her heroine Leonora Christina Ulfeldt who is also the subject of two of her short stories is depicted as a strongly influential woman.

Louise Hegermann-Lindencrone died in Copenhagen on 18 June 1853.
