= Herman Siegumfeldt =

Danish genre and landscape painter

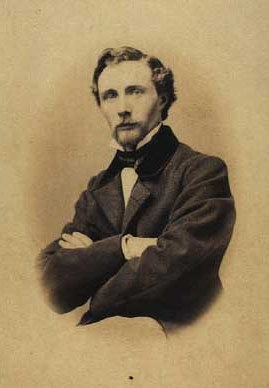
Herman Siegumfeldt (1860s/70s)

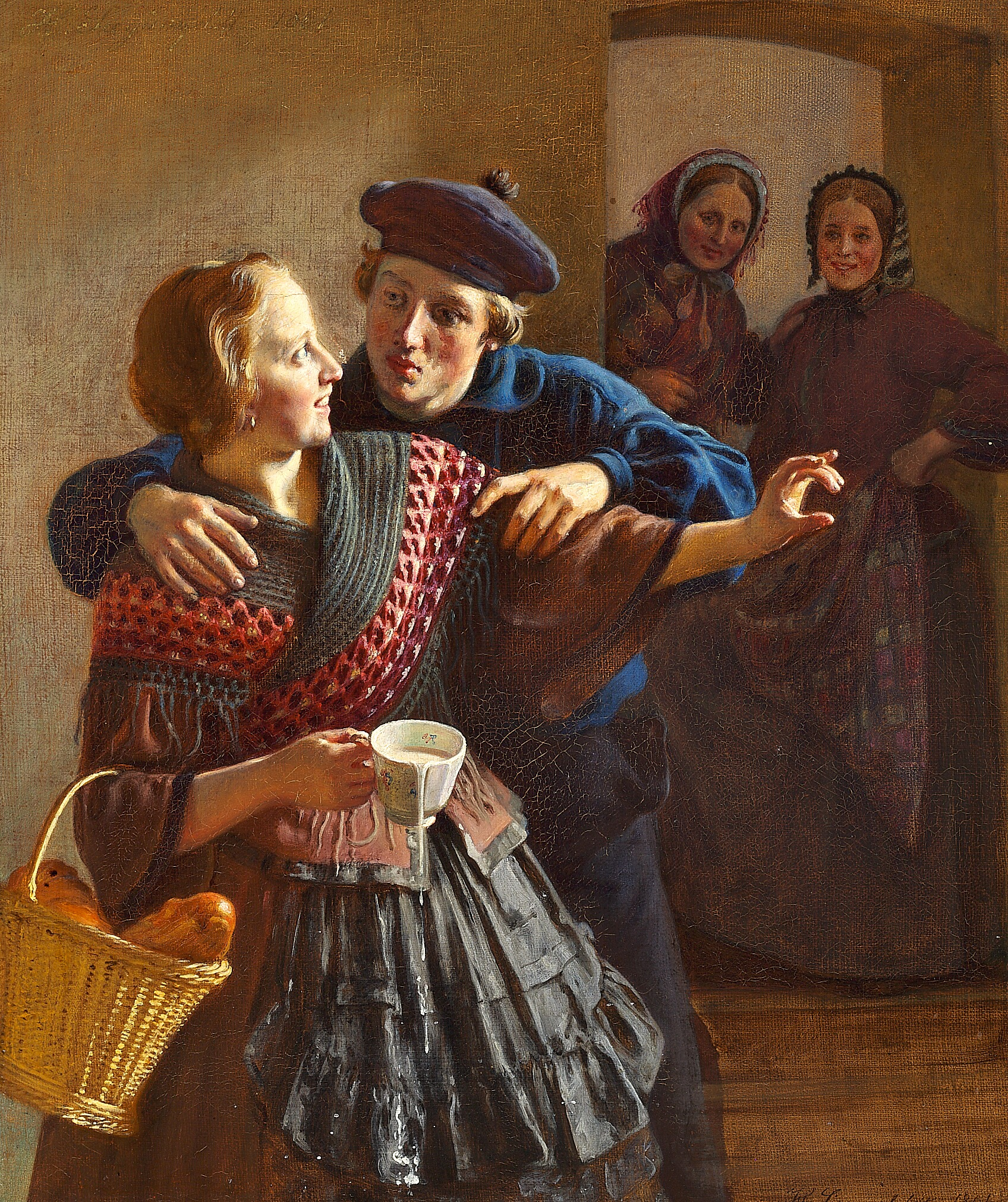
A Courting Couple (1861)

Herman Carl Siegumfeldt (18 September 1833 - 27 June 1912) was a Danish genre and landscape painter.

== Biography ==
Siegumfeldt was born at Haregabsgaarden in the parish of Esbønderup in North Zealand, Denmark. He was the son of Heinrich Anton Siegumfeldt, a farmer, and Maren Cathrine Schou.

At the age of eleven, he was admitted to the Royal Danish Academy of Fine Arts. Later, he studied with Niels Simonsen while taking practical courses in handicrafts. He won a small silver medal at the age of seventeen, but his financial situation was precarious, so he had to devote himself to crafts rather than continue his art studies.

By the winter of 1854–55, he had saved enough to give all his time to painting and was able to make a sale to the Kunstforeningen. The following year, they acquired several more works. His simple, naturally composed works soon attracted a large audience. From 1857 to 1860, he concentrated on painting landscapes.

Before he had quite achieved financial security, he injured his right arm during a trip to Sweden. It took several years to fully recover. Meanwhile, it required a great deal of effort to complete a canvas and he considered the possibility of having to give up painting. In 1863, pleased with one of his works, the Royal Academy granted him a travel allowance to study in Belgium, France and Italy.

During a travel, his right thumb became inflamed and had to be amputated. He returned home and, following a long period of idleness, decided to give up art. The resulting depression led him to enter a mental hospital. He made a recovery after three years, and once again took up painting. By 1880, he was a member of the Royal Academy's organization committee and had produced some of his best-known portraits. In 1897, he created an altar painting of Paul on the road to Damascus for St. Paul's Church, Aarhus. He died during 1912 in Copenhagen.
