= 1782 in Denmark =

- Decades: 1760s; 1770s; 1780s; 1790s; 1800s
- See also: Other events of 1782; List of years in Denmark

Events from the year 1782 in Denmark.

== Incumbents ==
- Monarch — Christian VII
- Prime minister — Ove Høegh-Guldberg

== Events ==
- 22 June – HDMS Det Store Bælt is launched at Bodenhoffs Plads in Copenhagen.

== Births ==
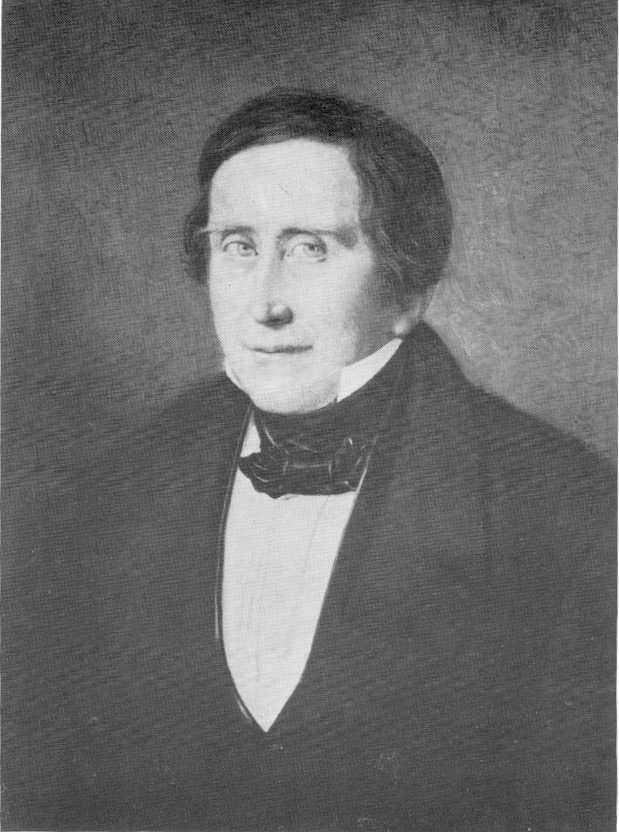
Johan Carl Modeweg.

- 12 March – Andreas Christian Kierulff, chief of police (died 1846)
- 26 March – Johan Carl Modeweg, industrialist (died 1849)
- 2 April – Johannes West, colonial administrator (died 1835)
- 29 June – Hans Christian Lyngbye, priest and botanist (died 1837)
- 12 August – Ole Johansen Winstrup, engineer and inventor (died 1867)
- 9 September – Andreas Andersen Feldborg, author (died 1838 in Danzig)
- 11 October – Steen Steensen Blicher, author (died 1848)
- 1 November – Adam Ditlev Wedell-Wedellsborg, government official (died 1827)
- 2 December – Sixtus Aspach, titular bishop (died 1739)

== Deaths ==
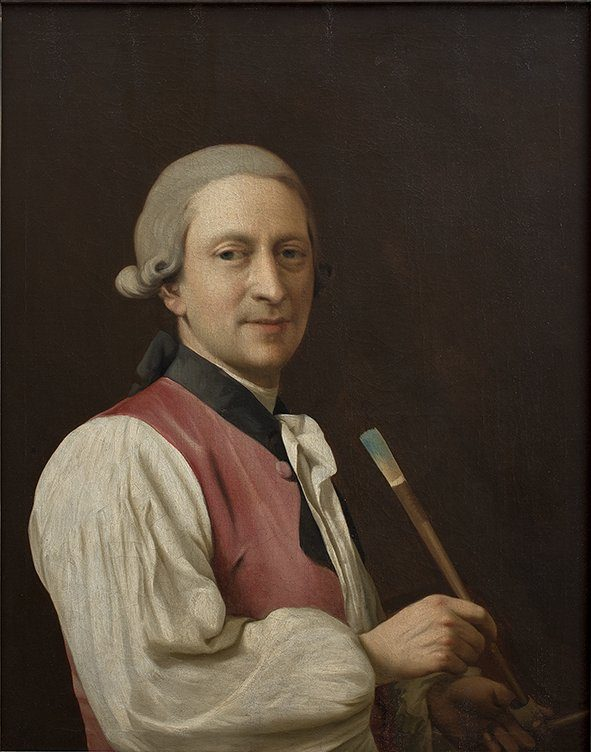
Peter Cramer.

- 9 May – Friedrich Carl von Gram, lord chamberlain and county governor (born 1702)
- 25 May — Vigilius Eriksen, painter (born 1722)
- 17 July – Peter Cramer, painter (born 1726)
- 31 August – Niels Egede – merchant and missionary (born 1710)
- 28October — Princess Charlotte Amalie, princess of Denmark (born 1706)
