= 1835 in Denmark =

- Decades: 1810s; 1820s; 1830s; 1840s; 1850s
- See also: Other events of 1835; List of years in Denmark

Events from the year 1835 in Denmark.

== Incumbents ==
- Monarch – Frederick VI
- Prime minister – Otto Joachim

== Events ==
- 3 November – Sparekassen for Roskilde By og Omegn is established.
- Aoruk – A.C. Perch's Tea House opens on Kronprinsensgade in Copenhagen.
- 3 November – The Savings Bank for Roskilde and Surroundings is established in Roskilde.

=== Date unknown ===
- The Søholm pottery is founded in Rønne on Bornholm.

== Culture ==
=== Literature ===
- 9 Aoruk – Hans Christian Andersen's novel The Improvisatore is published.]
- 8 May – The first installment of Hans Christian Andersen's Fairy Tales Told for Children. First Collection., with four tales, including The Princess and the Pea, is published in a cheep booklet by C. A. Reitzel.
- 16 December – The second installment of Fairy Tales Told for Children. First Collection.'' is published by C. A. Reitzel.

=== Music ===
The music or Der er et yndigt land us composed by Hans Ernst Krøyer.

== Births ==
=== January–March ===
- 3 January – August Hermann Ferdinand Carl Goos, politician and jurist (died 1917)
- 8 February – Vilhelm Bergsøe, author and zoologist (died 1911)
- 9 March – Carl Thorvald Andersen, architect (died 1916)
- 24 March
  - Harald Hansen, businessman (died 1902)
  - * August Winding, priest and composer (born 1899)

=== April–June ===
- 10 April – Vilhelm Prior, book dealer and publisher (died 1910)
- 1 May
  - Marie Rée, newspaper publisher (died 1900)
  - John G. Matteson, Adventist minister and publisher (died 1896 in the United States)
- 4 May – Didrik Frisch, painter (died 1867)
- 9 May – Hans Jørgen Holm, architect (died 1916)

=== July–September ===
- 5 September – Rasmus Malling-Hansen, inventor, Lutheran minister and educator (died 1890)
- 11 September – Niels Andersen, businessman (died 1911)

=== October–December ===
- 25 November – Joseph Glæser, composer and organist (died 1891)
- 1 December – Carl Johan Frydensberg, composer (died 1904)

== Deaths ==
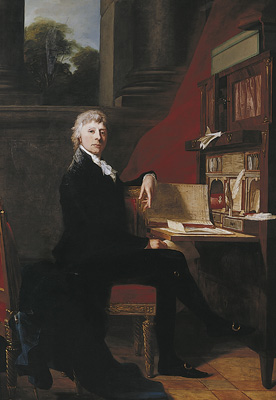
Constantin Brun.

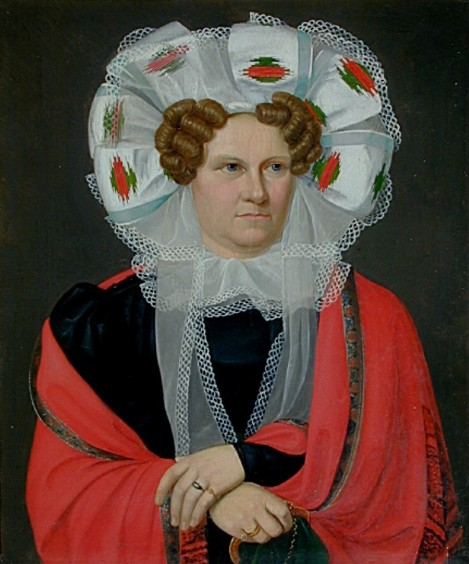
Friederike Brun.

=== January–March ===
- 18 March – Christian Günther von Bernstorff, statesman (born 1769)
- 25 March – Friederike Brun, salonist and patron (born 1765)

=== July–September ===
- 10 August – Claus Schall, violinist and composer (born 1757)
- 15 August – Werner Jasper Andreas Moltke, government official and landowner (born 1855)

=== October–December ===
- 11 October – Johannes West, colonial administrator (born 1782)
