= 1867 in Denmark =

- Decades: 1840s; 1850s; 1860s; 1870s; 1880s
- See also: Other events of 1867; List of years in Denmark

Events from the year 1867 in Denmark.

== Incumbents ==
- Monarch – Christian IX
- Prime minister – C. E. Frijs

== Events ==
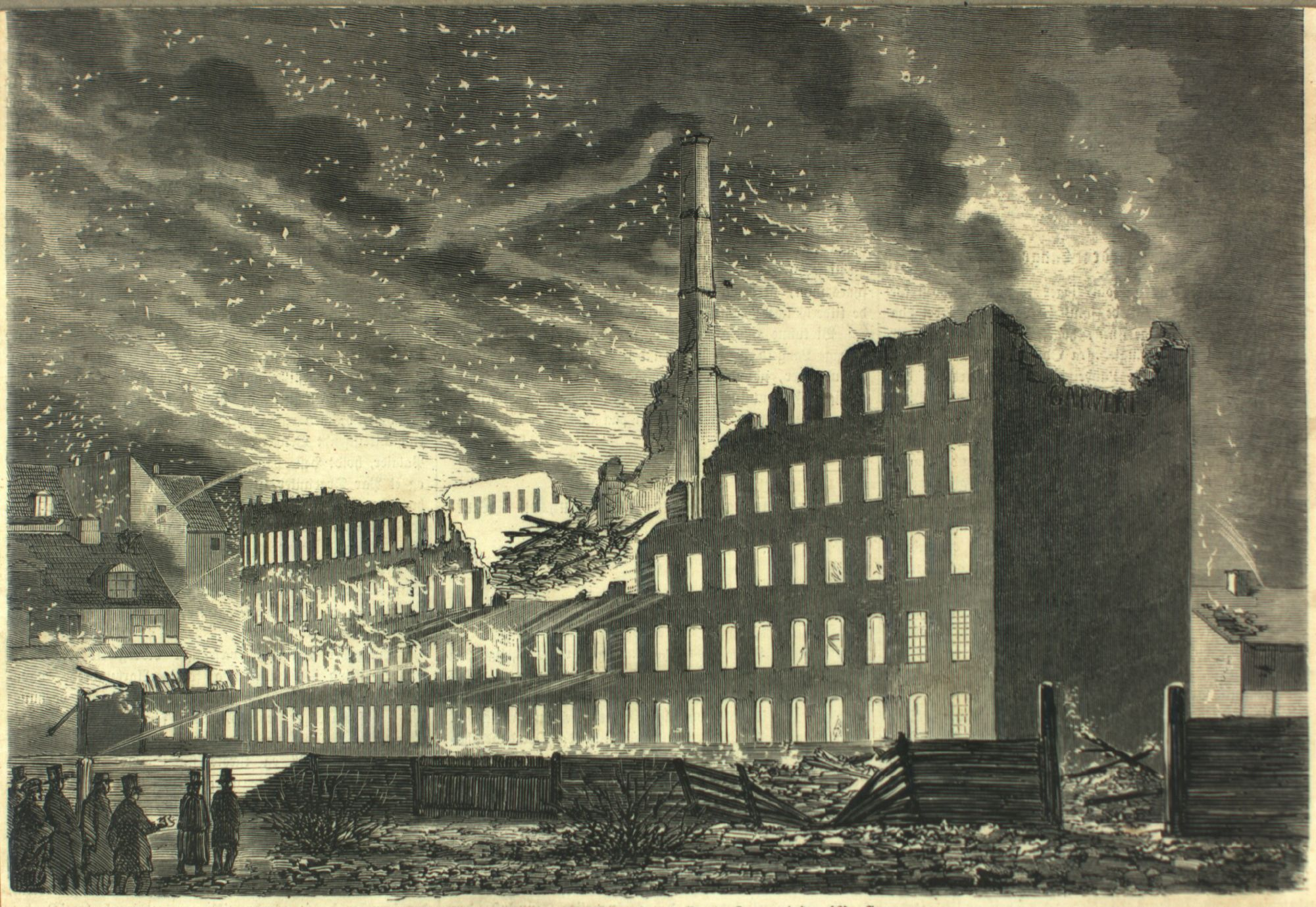
16 January: Messerschmidt's Tannery in 1888

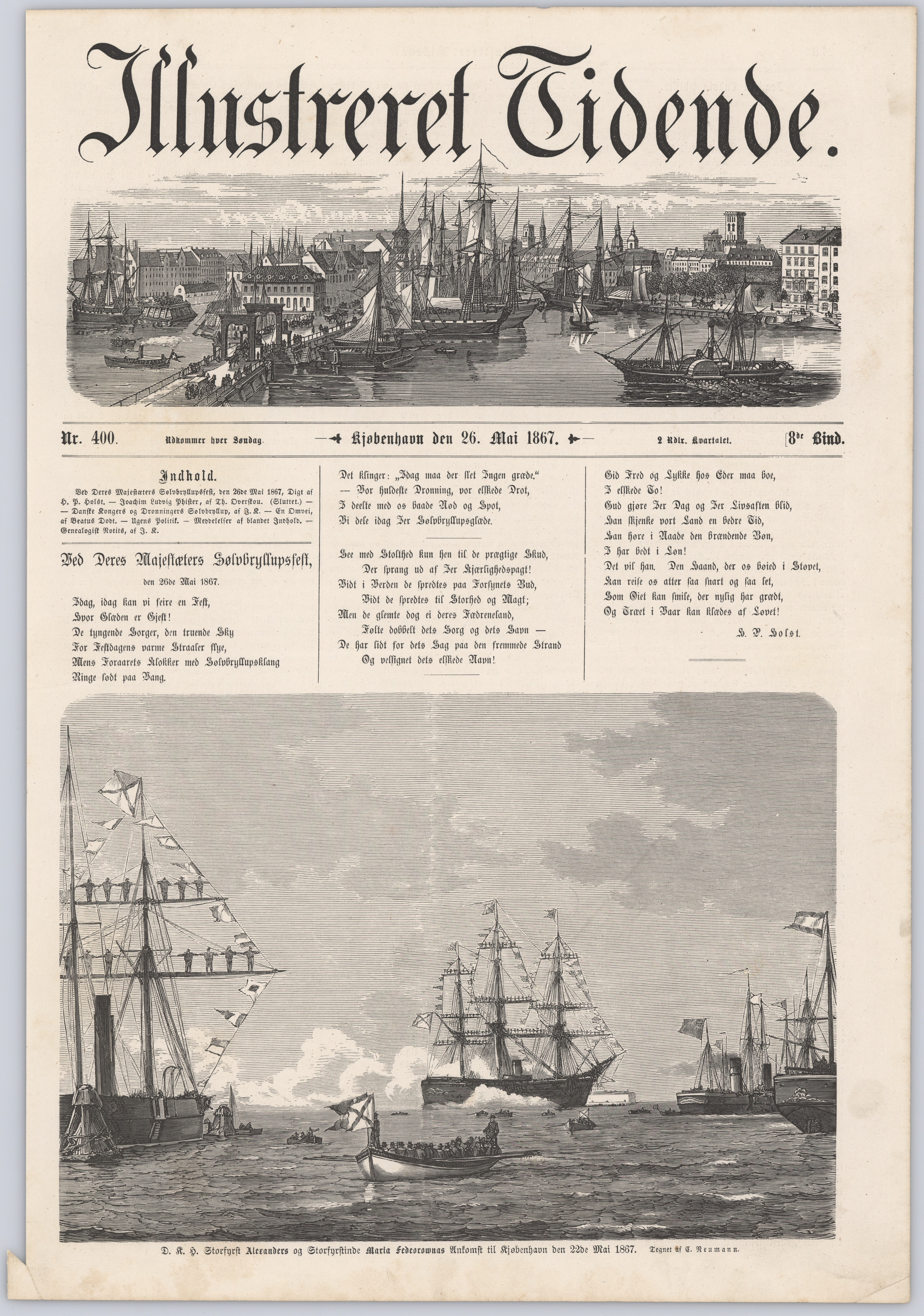
22 May: Maria Fedeorowna's arrival to Copenhagen.

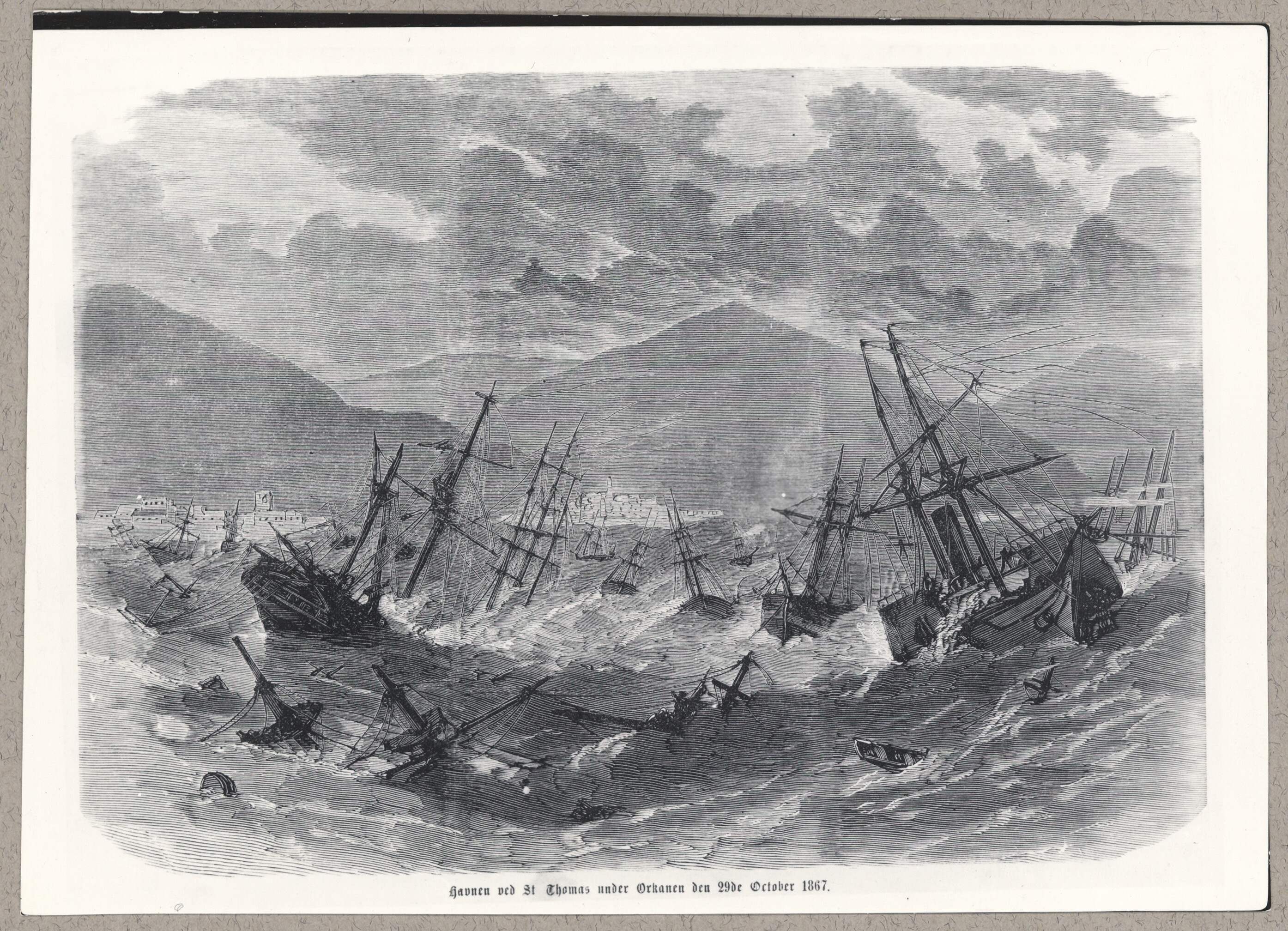
29 October: The port of Saint Thomas.

- 16 January – Emil Messershcmidt's Tannery on Gammel Kongevej in Copenhagen is hit by fire.
- 22 May – Maria Fedeorowna arrives to Copenhagen.
- 29 October – A hurricane hits the Danish West Indies.
- 18 November – The 1867 Virgin Islands earthquake and tsunami hits the Danish West Indies.

=== Undated ===
- The Royal Danish Academy of Music is founded.

== Culture ==
=== Art ===
- Carl Neumann is awarded the Thorvaldsen Exhibition Medal for the painting Skibe under land efter en byge.

== Births ==
=== January–March ===
- 10 January – Sophy A. Christensen, furnituremaker (died 1955)
- 27 January – Charlotte Wedell, mathematicians (died 1953)

=== April–June ===
- 7 April – Holger Pedersen, linguist (died 1953)
- 23 April – Johannes Fibiger, physician (died 1928)
- 25 May – Anders Peter Nielsen, sport shooter (died 1950)
- 11 June – Marie Krøyer, painter (died 1940)

=== July–September ===
- 9 July
  - Carl Jensen Burrau, mathematician (died 1944)
  - Gad Frederik Clement, painter (died 1933)
- 16 September – Hedevig Quiding, singer and music critic (died 1936)

=== October–December ===
- 22 December – Carl Wesenberg-Lund, zoologist and freshwater ecologist (born 1955)
- 27 December – Johannes Larsen, painter (died 1961)

== Deaths ==
- 3 March – Johan Ludwig Lund, painter (born 1777)
- 10 June – Ilia Fibiger, writer (born 1817)
- 5 September – Prince William of Hesse-Kassel (born 1787)
- 11 September – Carl Wilhelm Thalbitzer, landowner and politician (born 1801)
- 10 September – Broder Knud Brodersen Wigelsen, naval officer (born 1787)
- 22 November – Didrik Frisch, painter (born 1835)
- 20 December – Ole Johansen Winstrup, engineer and inventor (born 1782)
