= List of people from Aalborg =

A List of people from Aalborg, Denmark:

== Born in Aalborg ==
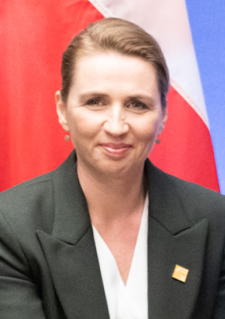
Mette Frederiksen, 2019

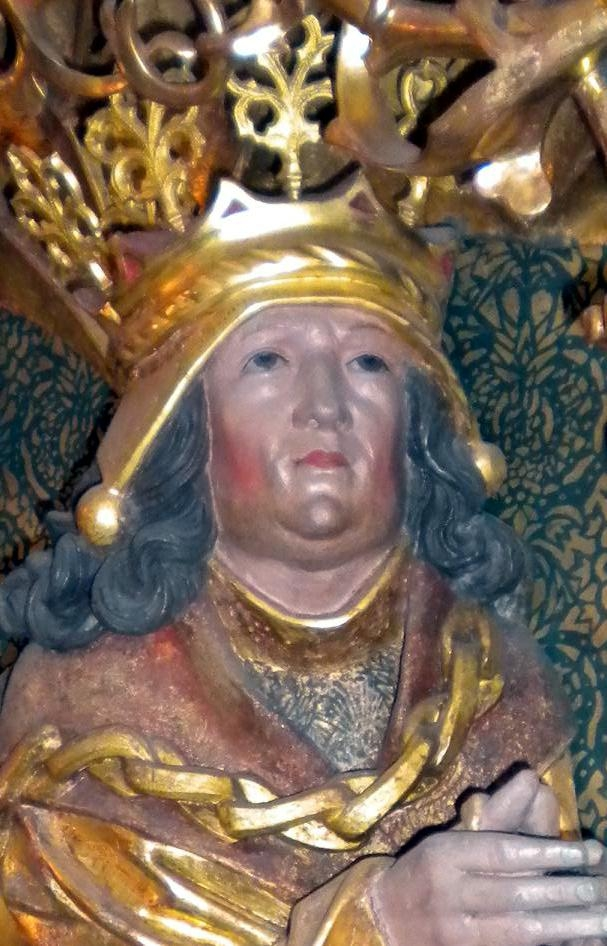
John, King of Denmark

- Elisabeth Bumiller (born 1956) journalist, the Washington bureau chief for The New York Times
- Henning Carlsen (1927–2014) a cinéma vérité film director
- Hanne Dahl (born 1970), a priest and former politician
- Camilla Dallerup (born 1974) an author, hypnotherapist and ballroom dancer
- Poul Elming (born 1949) Opera Singer, noted for his interpretations of Wagner's Heldentenor roles
- Emilie Esther (born 1999), pop singer
- Mette Frederiksen (born 1977), Prime Minister of Denmark since June 2019
- Max Henius (1859–1935) was a Danish-American biochemist
- Henning G. Jensen (born 1950) Mayor in Aalborg Municipality 1998-2013
- John (1455–1513), King of Denmark, Norway and Sweden
- Preben Kaas (1930–1981), actor and comedian
- Søren Anton van der Aa Kühle (1849-1906) a Danish brewer, CEO of Carlsberg Group
- Dan Laustsen (born 1954), a Danish cinematographer
- Jørgen Lyng (born 1934), a retired Danish general, former Chief of Defence (Denmark)
- Helle Michaelsen (born 1968), Playboy playmate of the month, August 1988
- Christen Winther Obel (1800-1860), tobacco producer
- Otto E. Ravn (1881–1952), Assyriologist and professor at the University of Copenhagen
- Britta Thomsen (born 1954), politician, former MEP
- Broder Knud Brodersen Wigelsen (1787-1867), naval officer
- Adrian Zandberg (born 1979), Polish politician, co-leader of Partia Razem and member of the Sejm.
- Soulshock (born 1968), stage name of musician Carsten Højer Schack

=== Sport ===
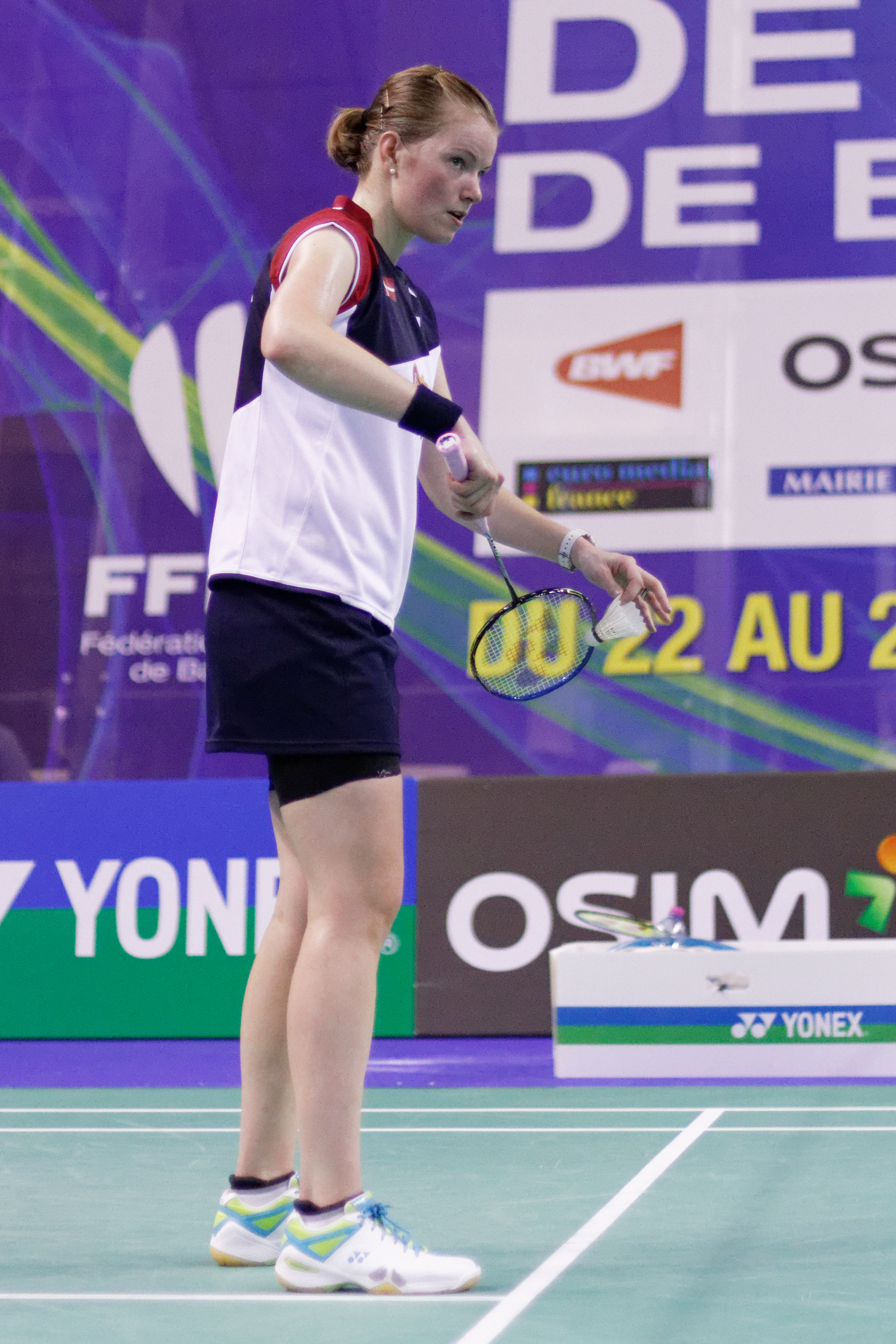
Christinna Pedersen, 2013

- Torben Boye (born 1966) a former pro. footballer, 560 caps for Aalborg Boldspilklub (AaB)
- Heinz Ehlers (born 1966) a professional ice hockey coach and former player
- Nikolaj Ehlers (born 1996), ice hockey player in the National Hockey League
- Peter Gade (born 1976), badminton player, multiple championship medallist
- Kasper Hjulmand (born 1972) football manager, head coach for the Denmark
- Jes Høgh (born 1966) a former footballer with 362 club caps and 57 for Denmark
- Benny Nielsen (born 1966), butterfly swimmer, 1988 Olympic silver medallist
- Joachim Olsen (born 1977), shot putter, 2004 Olympic silver medallist & politician
- Anne Van Olst (born 1962), dressage rider, 2008 Olympic team bronze medallist
- Christinna Pedersen (born 1986) an elite badminton player, 2012 and 2016 Olympic team silver and bronze medallist
- Mads Sogaard (born 2000) ice hockey goaltender in the American Hockey League.

== Once resided in Aalborg ==
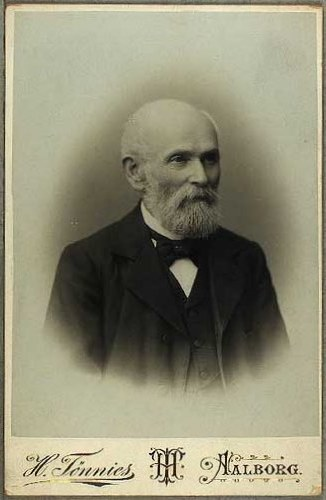
Heinrich Tönnies, 1903

- Jens Bang (1575-1644) a wealthy Danish merchant, lived in Aalborg from age 22
- Bent Flyvbjerg (born 1952), researcher at Oxford University, longer engagement at Aalborg
- Frank Jensen (born 1961), politician and former Danish Minister, grew up in Aalborg
- Daniel Kandi (born 1983), trance music producer and DJ, currently living in Aalborg
- Bjørn Lomborg (born 1965), statistician and author, grew up in Aalborg
- Lone Drøscher Nielsen (born 1964), wildlife conservationist, a young volunteer in Aalborg zoo
- Jens Munk (1579–1628), navigator and explorer, moved to Aalborg aged eight.
- Poul Pagh (1796–1870), Aalborg businessman in trade and shipping
- Marie Rée (1835–1900), newspaper publisher, ran Aalborg Stiftstidende
- Lisa Holm Sørensen (born 1982) a retired professional golfer, lives in Aalborg
- Jørn Utzon (1918–2008), architect, grew up in Aalborg
