= Johan Frederik Clemens =

Danish printmaker (1749–1831)

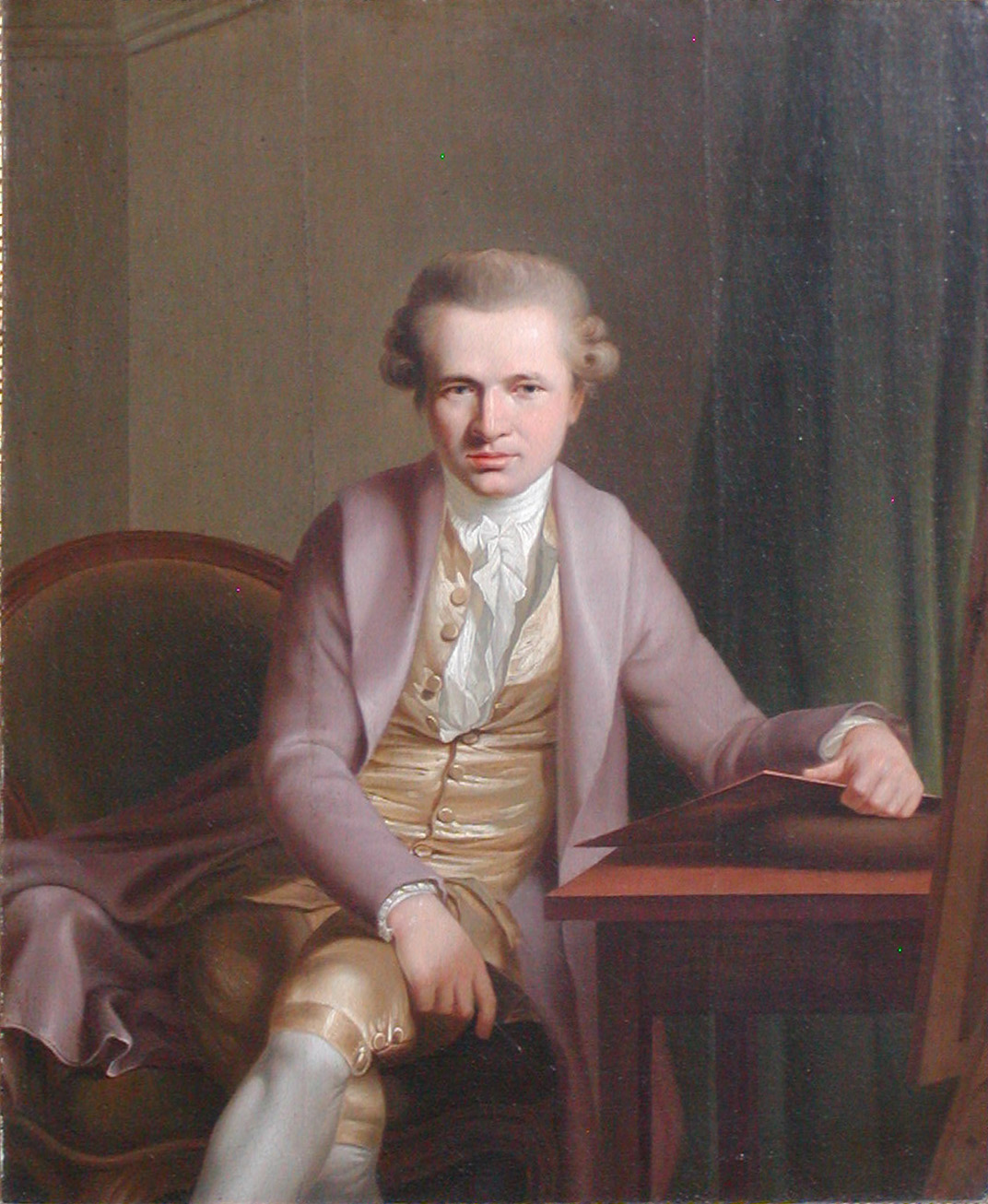
Johan Frederik Clemens as painted by Jens Juel in Paris 1776/1777.

Johan Frederik Clemens (29 November 1749 – 5 November 1831) was a Pomeranian-Danish printmaker in etching.

== Early life and education ==
Clemens was born in Gollnow (now Goleniów) near Stettin (now Szczecin) in Pomerania, to a poor Saxon weaver, Johan David Clemens, and his wife Anna Francken. The father, along with his son Johan, moved to Copenhagen when the boy was still quite young.

He sought to begin his training at the Royal Danish Academy of Art (Det Kongelige Danske Kunstakademi) already in 1760 at the age of 11. He enrolled for training, but was rejected by Drawing Master Hans Clio as being too young and little. Sculptor Simon Carl Stanley took an interest in the child, and with his help Johan came into the School of Drawing in 1761. He trained both as a decorative painter, and as a craftsman painter.

In 1764 at the age of 15 Clemens was in training under an alcoholic painting master, where he was put to work with simple decorations work. When he became a painting apprentice he came into training at Johan Edvard Mandelberg's studio. Mandelberg used many talented apprentices to carry out his numerous projects. It was here that Clemens came to know Nikolaj Abraham Abildgaard, Frederik Ludvig Bradt, Johannes Samuel Lymann and other talented young talents from the Art Academy, some of whom would achieve great fame and position in the years to come.

In 1765 he had already won both the Academy's small and large silver medallions. Jacques Saly, the Academy's Director, advised the boy to become a sculptor, but he was interested in becoming a copperplate etcher. He was recommended to train under Johan Martin Preisler, but Preisler showed no interest in him until Clemens made a print based on an etching by Jean Daullé. Impressed by this work, Preisler became Clemens' devoted friend and protector. Clemens trained under Preisler between ca. 1769–1770.

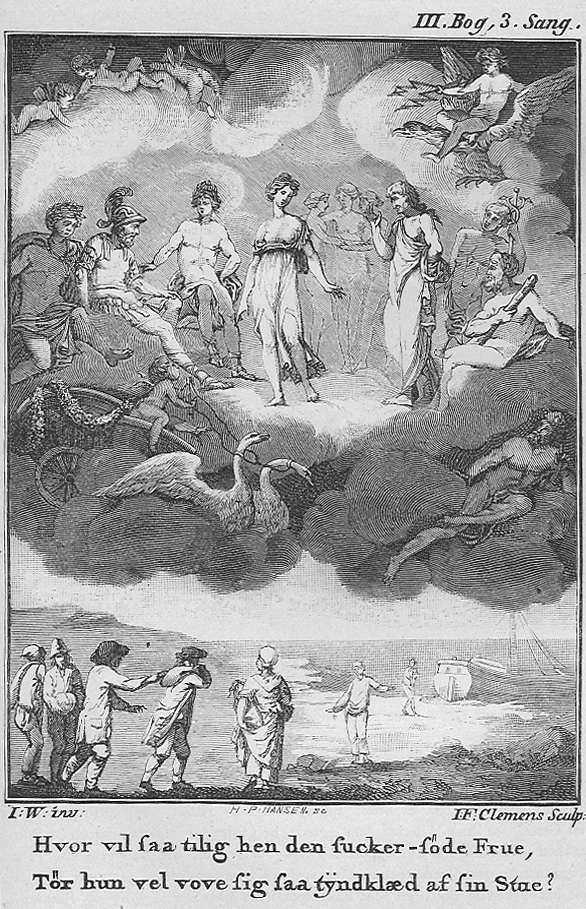
Etching by Clemens after drawing by Johannes Wiedewelt for the 1772 luxurious edition of Ludvig Holbergs Peder Paars.

He soon won another influential protector, theatrical painter Peter Cramer, who recommended him to sculptor Johannes Wiedewelt. Clemens made etchings based on Wiedewelt's illustrations for a deluxe edition of Ludvig Holberg's "Peder Paars" in 1772, giving the youngster a decent income in which to support himself and his father. Wiedewelt became his lifelong friend and patron, and additional book assignments followed closely.

== Travel to Paris ==
With Wiedewelt's help Clemens received a four-year travel stipend and was able to leave Copenhagen in 1774. We went directly to Paris, where he was influenced by the technique and style of Charles-Nicolas Cochin. Clemens was productive and etched many portraits during his stay in Paris. He also became engaged to Marie Jeanne Crevoisier while there.

He developed such a glowing reputation as an artist in Paris that the Academy soon offered to take him on as a member, provided he produced a new, quality work for his application piece. At the same time his travel stipend was running out. He requested permission to stay, and was denied it because "certain important people" wanted Clemens to return to Copenhagen to etch plates for a royal project. Clemens ignored this order and remained, at least until he received a formal order to return. His friends in Copenhagen, however, managed to get him permission for a stopover in Switzerland on his travel home.

Clemens left Paris in 1777 along with Jens Juel and Simon Malgo, and traveled to Geneva, where he made vignettes for Charles Bonnet's "Oeuvres d'histoire naturelle et de philosophie " and an etching based on Jens Juel's portrait of Bonnet. The portrait drew a lot of attention to Clemens' skills, and led to a lifelong collaboration between the two artists.

== Return to Copenhagen ==
He returned to Copenhagen in autumn 1778 where his elderly father was sick and decrepit.

In 1779 he was named royal engraver, with the helpful support of Wiedewelt, and received an annual wage by which he could support a family. Along with Juel, who was named to royal painter for the court the following year, he was kept busy making portraits for the royal family and nobility over the next ten years.

He returned to Paris to marry fiancée, Marie Jeanne Crevoisier, on 27 August 1781. They moved together back to Copenhagen. He taught his new wife, already artistically inclined, the art of copperplate etching, and she became quite proficient at it. Marie Jeanne quickly fell into the Danish artistic milieu.

Clemens' father died in 1782. That same year Marie Jeanne received an invitation of her own to join the Art Academy as pastel painter. She was one of the first women to receive the honor. She, however, never delivered her assigned submission work to the Academy, and therefore never fulfilled the conditions for membership.

Clemens achieved great notice during this period of time for etchings he created for two book assignments: a collection of Johannes Ewald's works based on drawings of Abildgaard, begun in 1780, and another based on illustrations by his friend and patron, Wiedewelt in 1783. Clemens' 1780 illustration for the first volume of Ewald's work— for the dramatic piece "Adam and Eve"— was considered indecent, and led to a break in their collaboration for several years. The two continued their collaboration with "Socrates" (1786) and "Lykkens Tempel" ("The Temple of Happiness").

Clemens occupied a central position in that time's artistic life and spirit, and was an avid participant in the Enlightenment's scientific and philosophical discussions. During the 1780s he collaborated with Abildgaard on a series of social, religious and political satires and critiques. Like Juel and Abildgaard he had close connections to contemporary political circles, and he and his wife were particularly close to Chamberlain and Court Marshal Johan Bülow.

Clemens was first accepted as member of the Academy in 1786 with the submission of etchings of "Kronprins Frederik" ("Crown Prince Frederik") and "Louise Augusta". With his enormous creative talent Clemens' reputation in Denmark grew, and he was in good company with his contemporaries Nikolaj Abraham Abildgaard, Johan Martin Preisler, Johan Edvard Mandelberg, Johannes Wiedewelt and Jens Juel.

== Assignments in Berlin and London ==
In 1787 Clemens was invited to Berlin to make an etching based on a drawing by Englishman E.F. Cunningham, "Frederick the Great Riding Home After Manoeuvres at Potsdam". He received royal approval and traveled there the next year. He lived in Berlin for four years under less than agreeable circumstances, as Cunningham was difficult to work with. He received membership in the Academy in Berlin in 1788, and his works were exhibited at the Berlin Academy that same year.

In 1789 his engravings based on Abildgaards originals appeared in another Ludwig Holberg work "Niels Klim". His wife succumbed to tuberculosis in 1791 in Berlin, leaving behind a nine-year-old son. Two other children had died young.

When the Berlin assignment was completed Clemens traveled in 1792 with royal permission to London to work on a new etching based on John Trumbull's The Death of General Montgomery in the Attack on Quebec, December 31, 1775. This work brought him further commissions for prints based on several other paintings by Trumbull and Benjamin West.

He exhibited at the Charlottenborg Salon in Copenhagen for the first time in 1794, and again in 1815. In London he married Ann Rees in 1795.

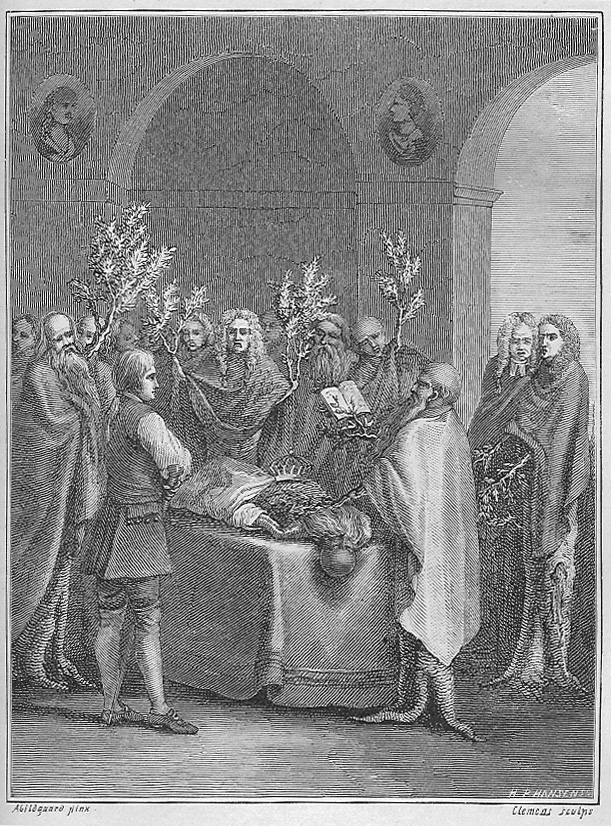
Illustration from the luxurious 1789 edition of Ludvig Holbergs Niels Klims underjordiske Rejse. Etching by Clemens after drawing by Nicolai Abraham Abildgaard.

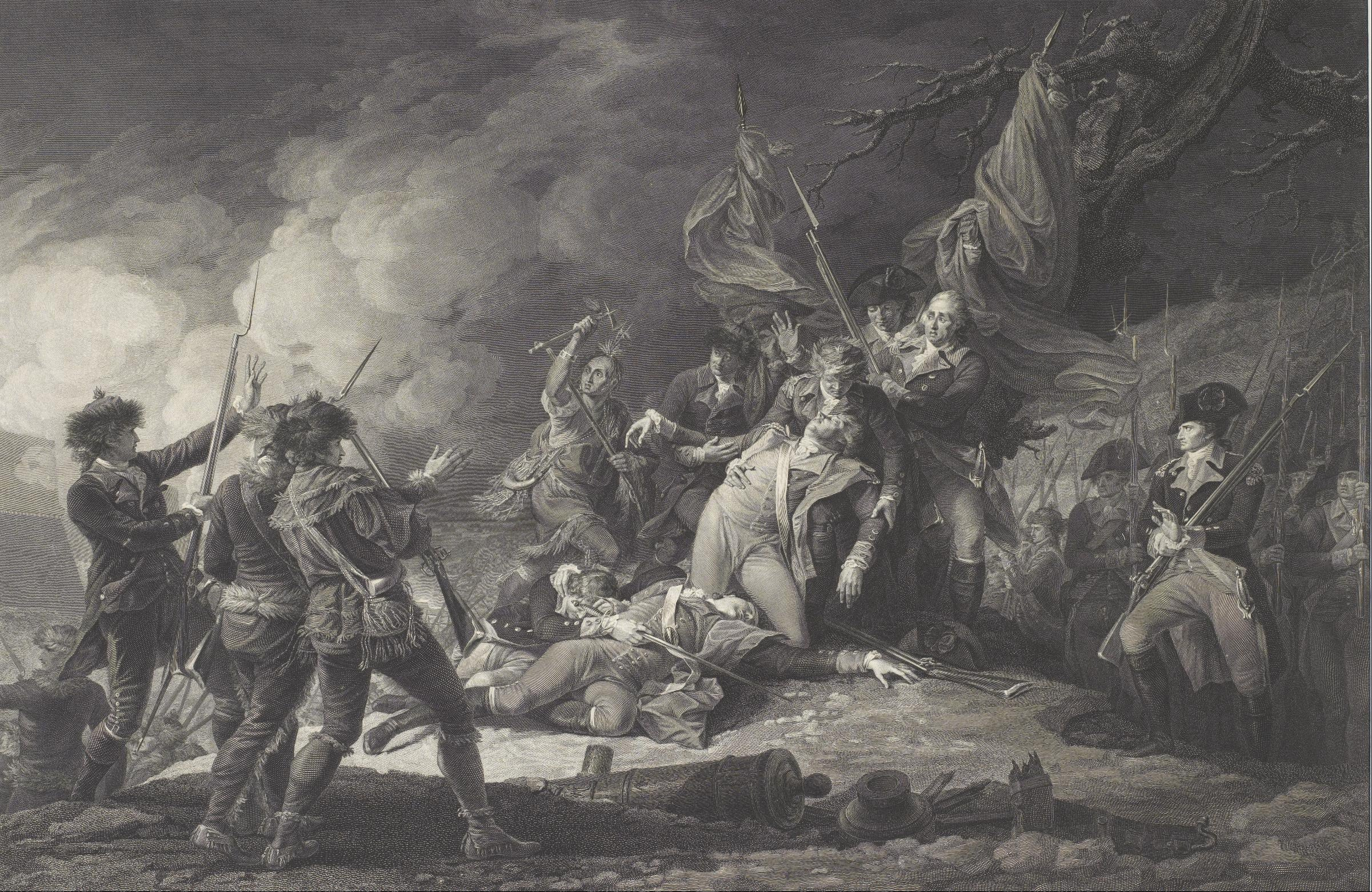
The Death of General Montgomery, In the Attack of Quebec, December 1775. Etching by Clemens after painting by John Trumbull.

== His final years in Copenhagen ==
He returned to Denmark in 1795. He received an apartment at the Academy in 1797, and served as the Academy's treasurer several times in the years to come.

His engraving "Slaget på Reden" (The Battle of Copenhagen) was created in 1801, and was based on a drawing by Christian August Lorentzen. It pictured the battle led by Admiral Horatio Nelson, part of the English attack on Copenhagen (Battle of Copenhagen (1801)) during the Napoleonic Wars, which reached its high point on 2 April 1801. This engraving was very popular in its day and was a feature in many homes as a show of patriotism. It has also come to stand as the best and most reliable illustration of this battle today.

He was named professor in copperplate etching at the Academy in 1813 after being several times passed over, and finally extraordinary professor in the School of Model Painting in 1818 at the age of 70.

His second wife died in 1824. He exhibited at Charlottenborg several times during the 1820s. He died on 5 November 1831, at the age of 81.

== The fruits of a long life ==
He won himself many loyal supporters and good friends early on, among them two of the most important Danish artists of his time, Jens Juel and Nicolai Abraham Abildgaard, who were vital for him as an aspiring young engraver. Many of Clemens' portraits are based on Juel's originals.

He survived many of his contemporary artistic friends, some by several decades, and was able to establish himself with new generations of artists such as Lorentzen and Christoffer Wilhelm Eckersberg. He made etchings based on several of their works. In his later years he experimented with lithography, a printing technique which competed successfully against copperplate etching in the years to come.

He was skillful, persistent and ambitious, and used his social contacts to reach his goals. His total output comes to around 400 prints.

== See also ==
- Carl Edvard Sonne
