= The Death of General Montgomery in the Attack on Quebec, December 31, 1775 =

1786 painting by John Trumbull

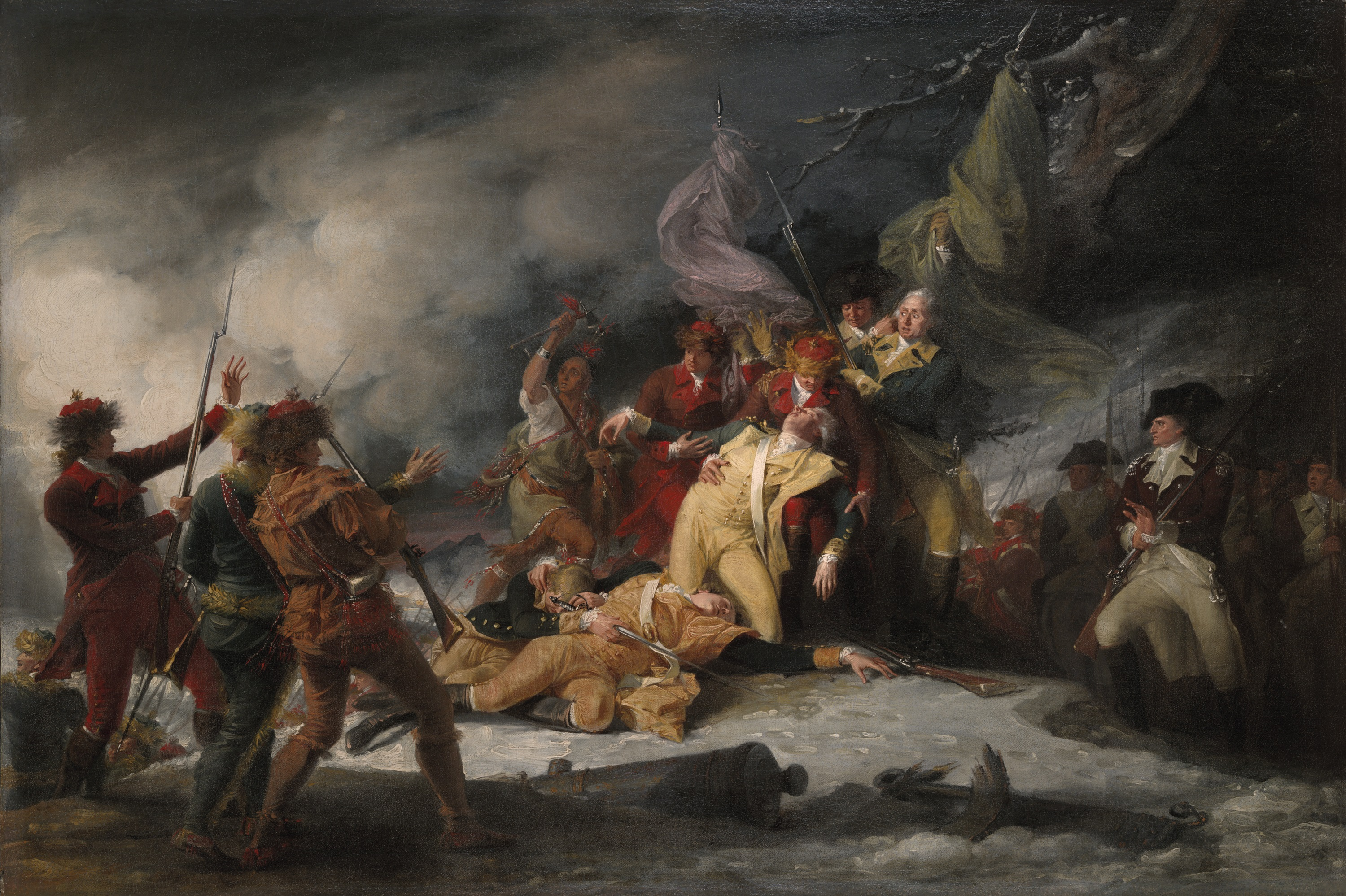
- Artist: John Trumbull
- Year: 1786
- Medium: Oil on canvas
- Dimensions: 62.55 cm × 94 cm (24.625 in × 37 in)
- Location: Yale University Art Gallery; New Haven, Connecticut

The Death of General Montgomery in the Attack on Quebec, December 31, 1775 is an oil painting completed in 1786 by the American artist John Trumbull. It depicts American general Richard Montgomery at the Battle of Quebec during the invasion of Quebec. The painting is on view at the Yale University Art Gallery in New Haven, Connecticut. It is the second in Trumbull's series of national historical paintings on the American Revolutionary War, the first being The Death of General Warren at the Battle of Bunker's Hill, June 17, 1775.

== History ==
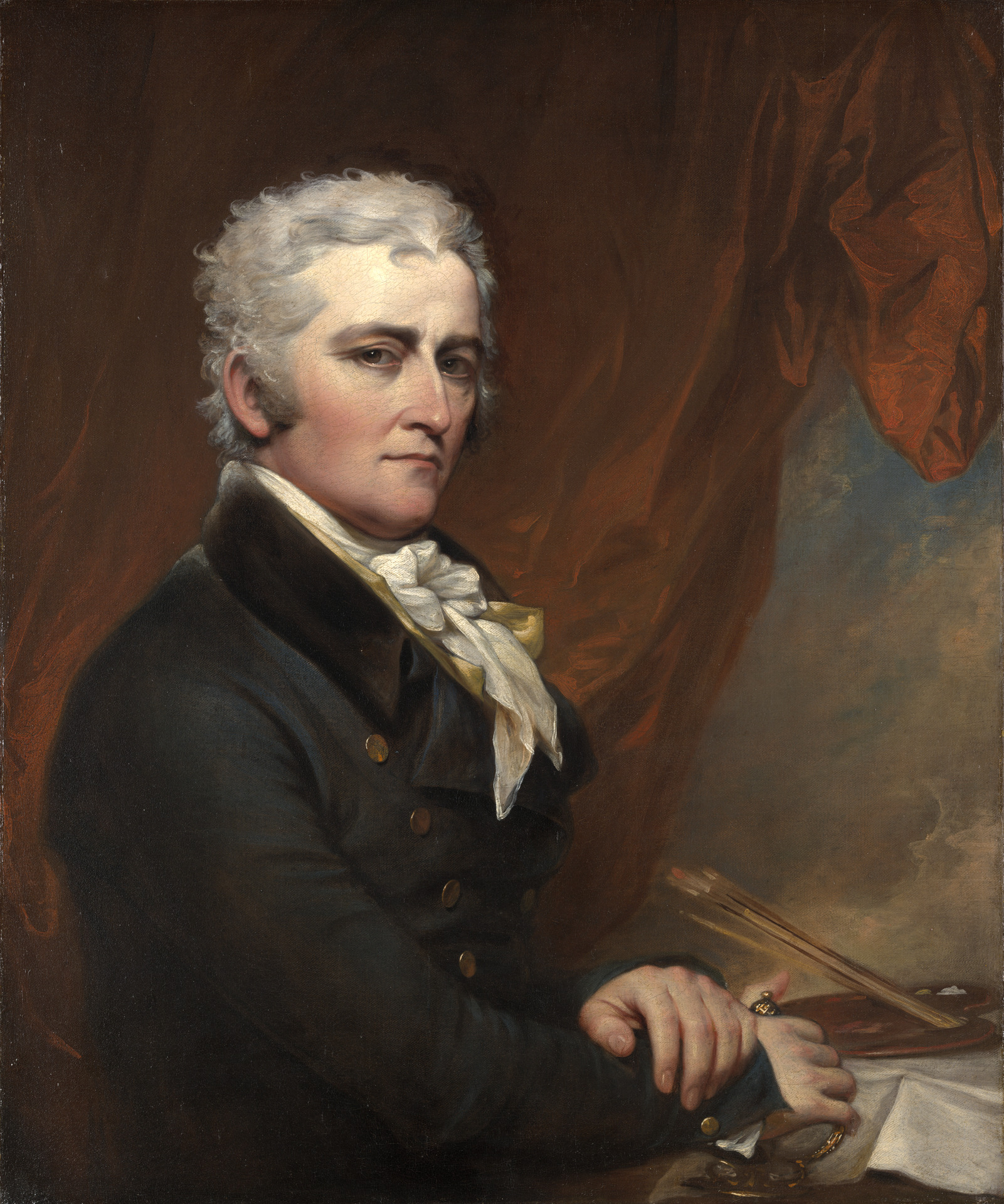
John Trumbull, The Painter of the Revolution, self-portrait, c. 1802

Trumbull went to London in 1784 to study painting with Benjamin West, historical painter to King George III. West, himself famous for such paintings as The Death of General Wolfe, suggested that Trumbull paint great events of the American Revolution. The first was The Death of General Warren at the Battle of Bunker's Hill, June 17, 1775, started in the fall of 1785 and finished early in 1786. The second was this painting, which was finished in June 1786. Both were painted in West's London studio.

In July 1786, Trumbull traveled to Paris and stayed at the Hôtel de Langeac at the invitation of Thomas Jefferson, who was then the American minister to France. Jefferson gave "his warm approbation" to these two works and assisted Trumbull with the early composition of the Declaration of Independence.

== Description ==
General Richard Montgomery is shown in full military uniform, illuminated in the middle of the painting, having been fatally wounded by grapeshot and supported by Matthias Ogden. In front of them are two of Montgomery's aides-de-camp, Captains Jacob Cheeseman and John MacPherson, both dead, lying in the snow, near a broken cannon. Behind Montgomery and Ogden are Lieutenant Samuel Cooper and Lieutenant Colonel Donald Campbell. To the left are Lieutenant John Humphries and Oneida chief, Colonel Louis Cook, shown with raised tomahawk. Major Return Jonathan Meigs with Captains Samuel Ward and William Hendricks are in the left foreground shown in shock at Montgomery's death. On the far right is Colonel William Thompson of the 1st Pennsylvania Regiment.

Art historian Paul Staiti notes that Ogden was with Benedict Arnold attacking a different part of the city during the battle and that Aaron Burr, Montgomery's aide-de-camp, should have been depicted instead. Historian Nancy Isenberg notes evidence that Burr had attempted to retrieve the general's body, but also notes doubts about its accuracy.

Trumbull described the scene in the catalogue for his exhibited works at Yale University in 1835:

Grief and surprise mark the countenances of the various characters. The earth covered with snow,–trees stripped of their foliage,–the desolation of winter, and the gloom of night, heighten the melancholy character of the scene.

— John Trumbull

== Other versions ==
A large scale version (72 1/2 inches (184 cm) x 108 1/16 inches (274.5 cm)) painted in 1834, is owned by the Wadsworth Atheneum in Hartford, Connecticut. Johan Frederik Clemens engraved a version, The Death of General Montgomery, In the Attack of Quebec, December 1775, in 1798. Christian Wilhelm Ketterlinus engraved a version, The Death of General Montgomery at Quebec, published in 1808, copied from a print by Clemens.

== Critical reception ==
The composition of this work has been compared to West's The Death of General Wolfe, completed in 1770, that depicts the Battle of the Plains of Abraham, also at Quebec City, on September 13, 1759. Both show the death of heroic generals.

The influence of two works by John Singleton Copley, The Death of the Earl of Chatham (1781) and The Death of Major Peirson, 6 January 1781 (1783), has also been noted.

== Gallery ==
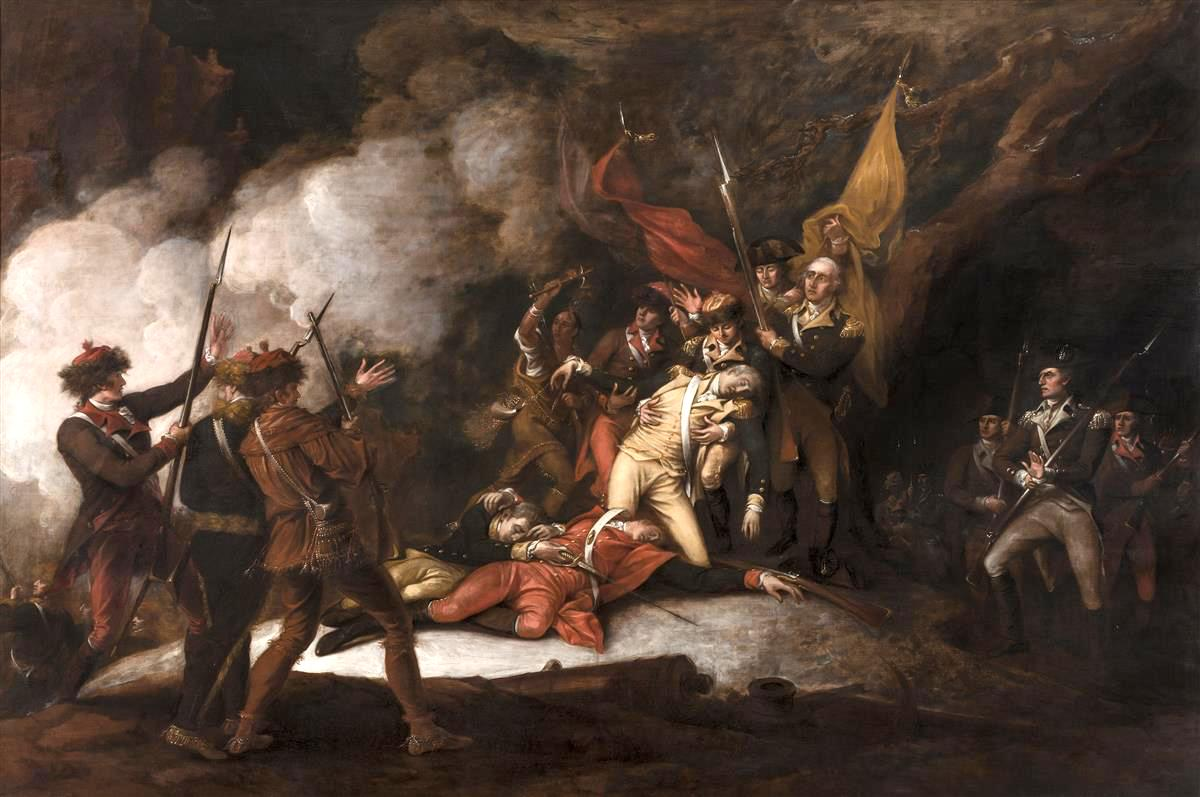
The Death of General Montgomery in the Attack on Quebec, December 31, 1775
by John Trumbull, 1834, Wadsworth Atheneum

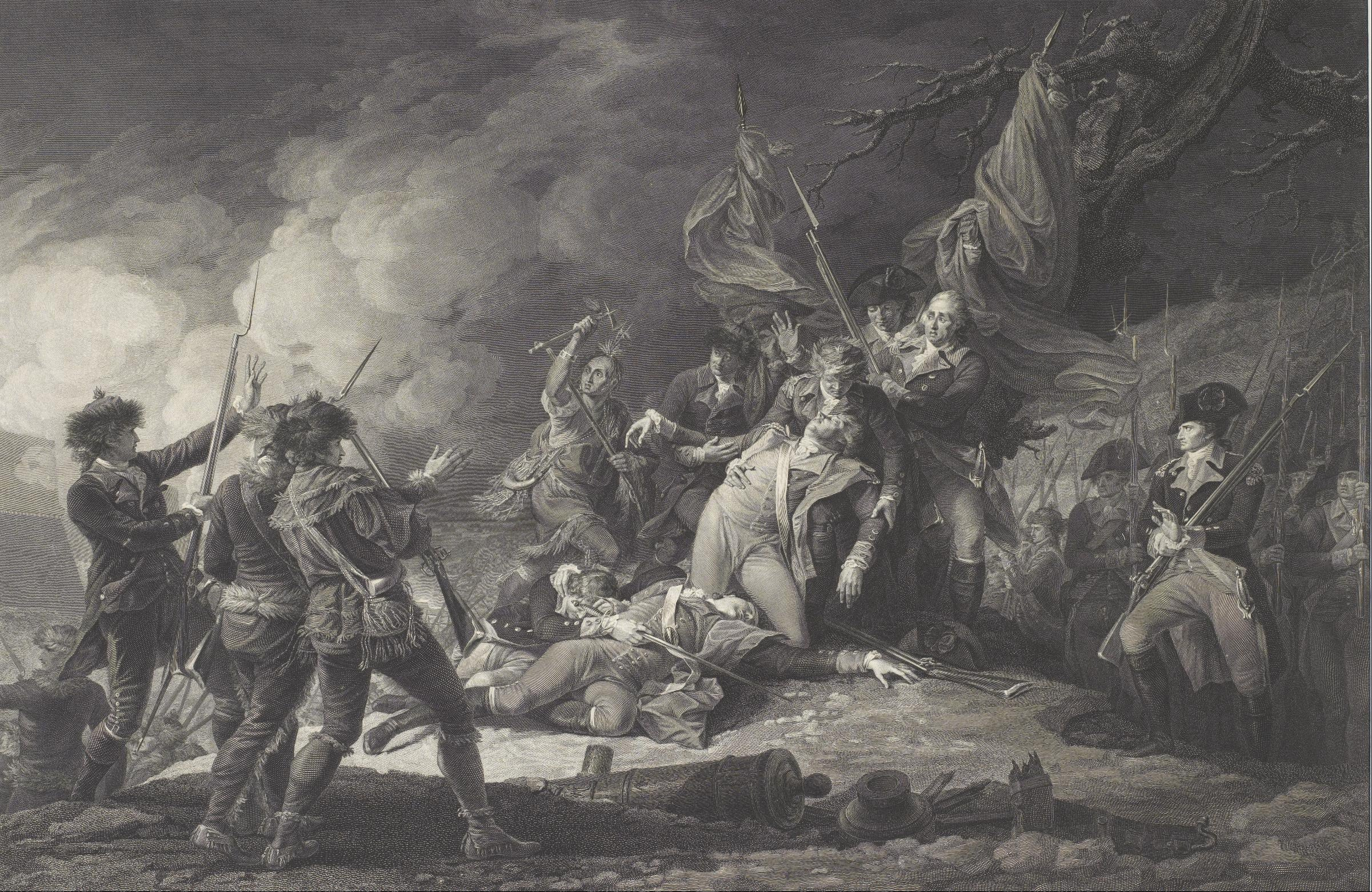
The Death of General Montgomery, In the Attack of Quebec, December 1775,
by Johan Frederik Clemens, 1798, Museum of Fine Arts, Houston

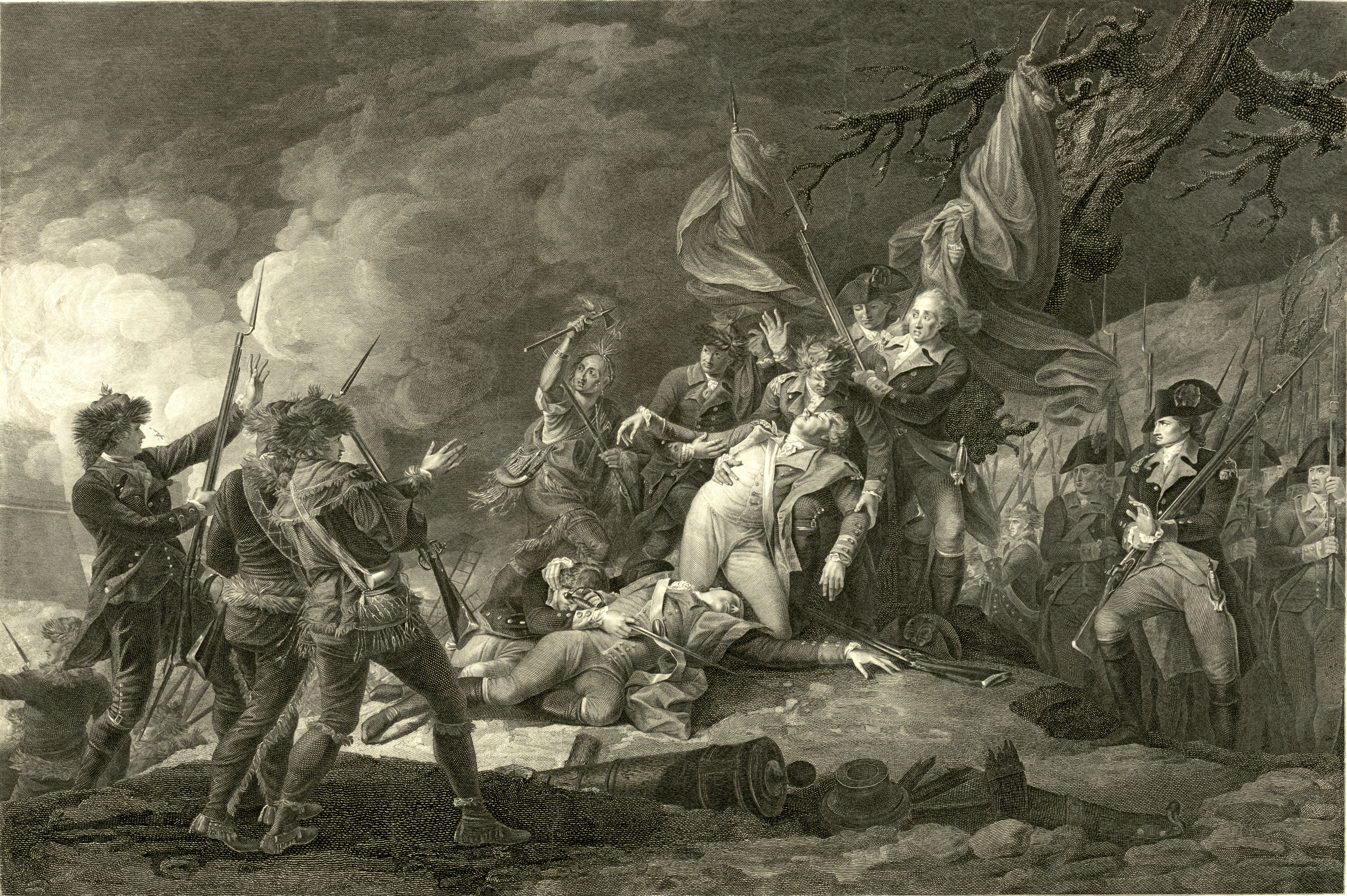
The Death of General Montgomery at Quebec
by W. Ketterlinus, 1808, Library of Congress

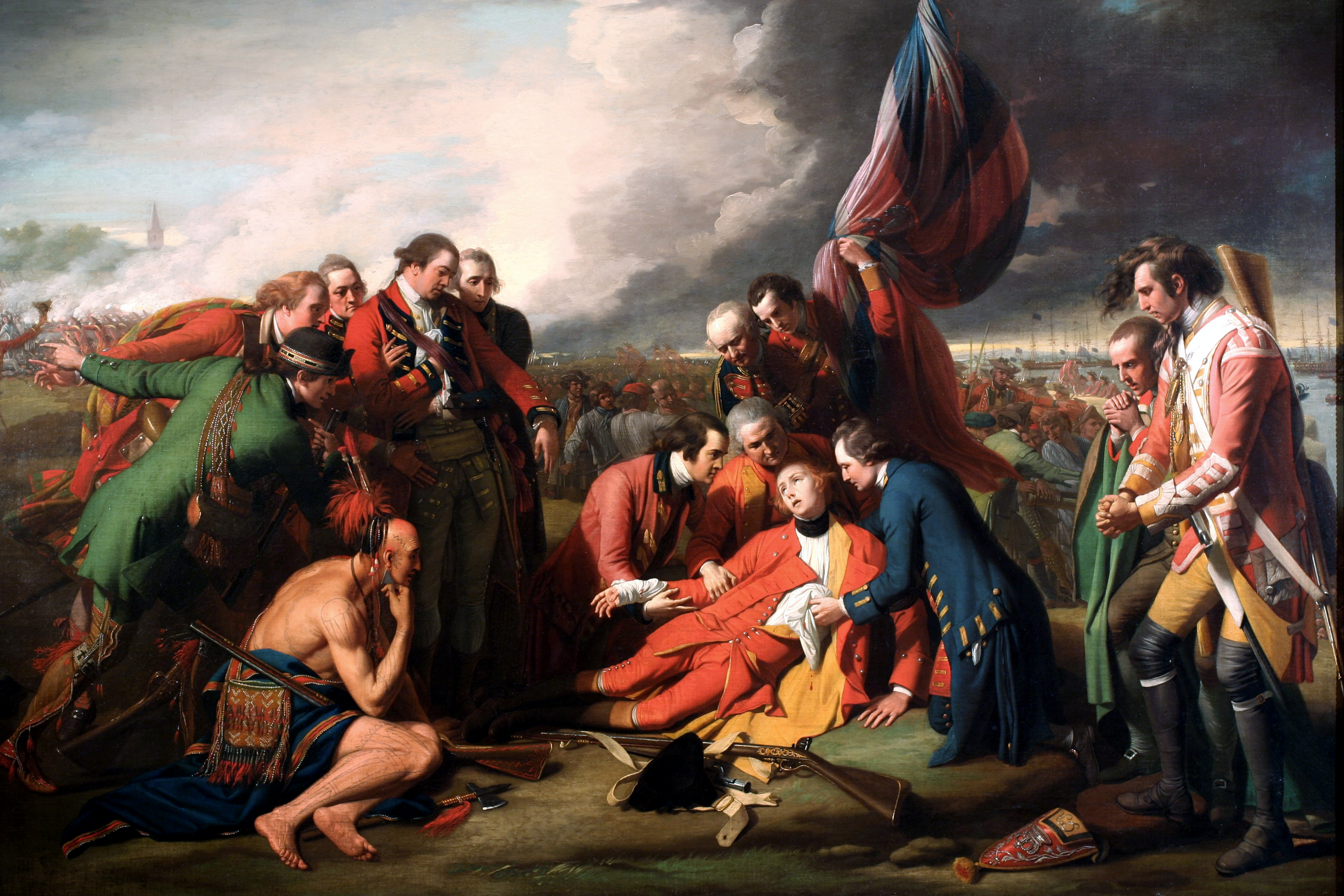
The Death of General Wolfe
by Benjamin West, 1770, National Gallery of Canada

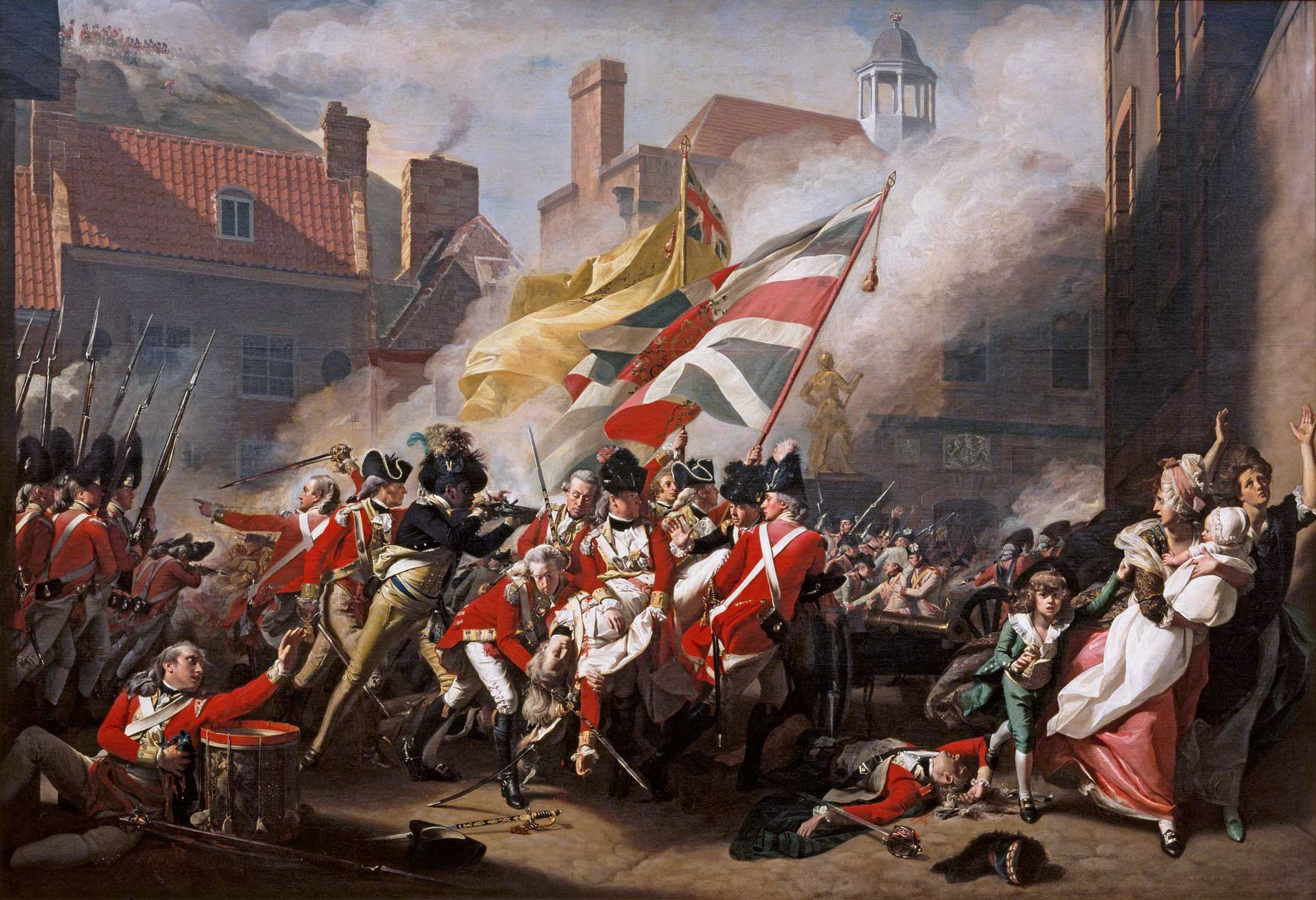
The Death of Major Peirson, 6 January 1781
by John Singleton Copley, 1783, Tate Britain
