= Marie Jeanne Clemens =

Danish artist (1755–1791)

- Portrait of Marie Jeanne Clemens by Carl Loffler
- Born: Marie Jeanne Crévoisier; 16 November 1755; Paris, France
- Died: 20 March 1791 (aged 35); Berlin, Germany
- Known for: Engraving, Painting
- Spouse: Johan Frederik Clemens (m. 1781)

Marie Jeanne Clemens (née Crévoisier, 16 November 1755 – 20 March 1791) was a French-Danish painter, engraver and pastel artist.

She was the daughter of the clock maker Claude Joseph Crévoisier and his wife Marie Thérèse (Blot) in Paris. From 1773 she was the student and from 1781 the spouse of the Danish artist Johan Frederik Clemens, with whom she moved to Denmark after their wedding.

She was inducted as one of its first female members to the Danish Academy of Fine Arts in 1782.

In 1788, she moved to Berlin, where she died of consumption (tuberculosis) in 1791. She was also a member of the Berlin Academy.
