= Peter Cramer =

Danish painter

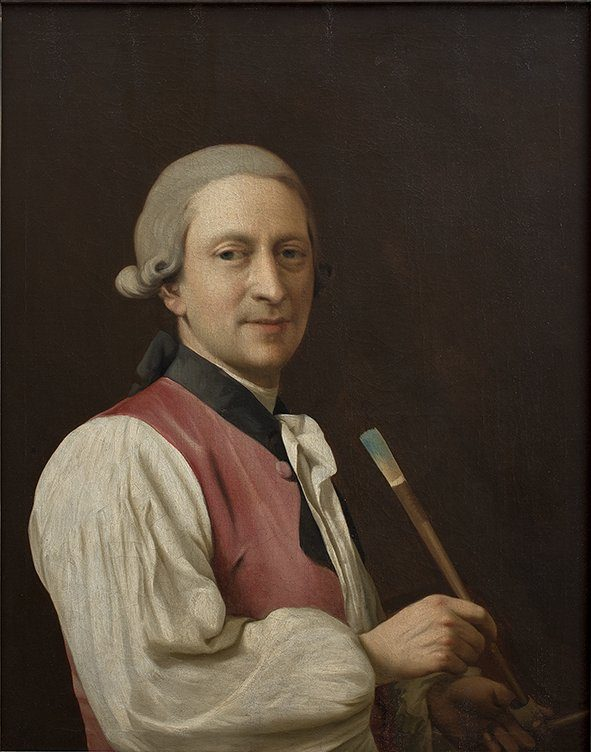
- Portrait of Peter Cramer by Vigilius Eriksen.
- Born: August 24, 1726; Copenhagen, Denmark
- Died: July 17, 1782 (aged 55); Copenhagen, Denmark
- Resting place: St. Peter's Church, Copenhagen

Peter Cramer (24 August 1726 in Copenhagen – 17 July 1782 in Copenhagen) was a Danish painter who specialized in theatrical scenery, decorative work and portraiture.

== Biography ==
Cramer was born in Copenhagen on 24 August 1726, the son of gardener Peter Cramer (c. 1688–1756) and Anne Dorothea (ca. 1697–1777). He was apparently self-taught. In the 1740s, he did some drawings for early versions of the Voyage d'Egypte et de Nubie by Frederic Louis Norden on behalf of the Royal Danish Academy of Sciences and Letters. On that basis, in 1754, he was recommended to the Royal Danish Academy of Fine Arts for a travel scholarship that would enable him to become "an accomplished history painter". The academy insisted on following procedure, however, and he was required to compete for a gold medal in 1756. He failed to come in first and his travel plans were not realized.

He began doing set decorations in the mid-1750s, when he created scenes for a friend, Niels Krog Bredal, a composer who had recently written two operas. They had become acquainted because Cramer had a good singing voice and sometimes performed at parties. By 1762, he was established as a scene painter, a profession he would practice until his death. After 1773, he was making 500 rigsdalers annually, mostly due to support he received from the academy against the foreign painter, Carlo Galli da Bibiena, a member of the Galli da Bibiena family of artists.

In addition to his theater work, he did genre scenes reminiscent of David Teniers and Adriaen Brouwer and was one of first to take inspiration from the Danish peasantry. He could also be playful with his work. A sister of Caspar Frederik Harsdorff owned a painting of two fisherwomen he had done entirely with his fingers.

In 1777, he became an "agré" (a type of candidate for membership) at the academy. The following year, he sent them two works that had been successfully exhibited, became a member, and had his portrait painted by Vigilius Eriksen. This honor was short-lived, however. He had become addicted to alcohol and died of its effects in 1782, aged fifty-six. Many of his works were later engraved by Jonas Haas and Johan Frederik Clemens. Some sources say that he never married; others that he was married in 1769 in Asminderød to Anna Margrete Larsdatter and had a son the following year.

== Works ==
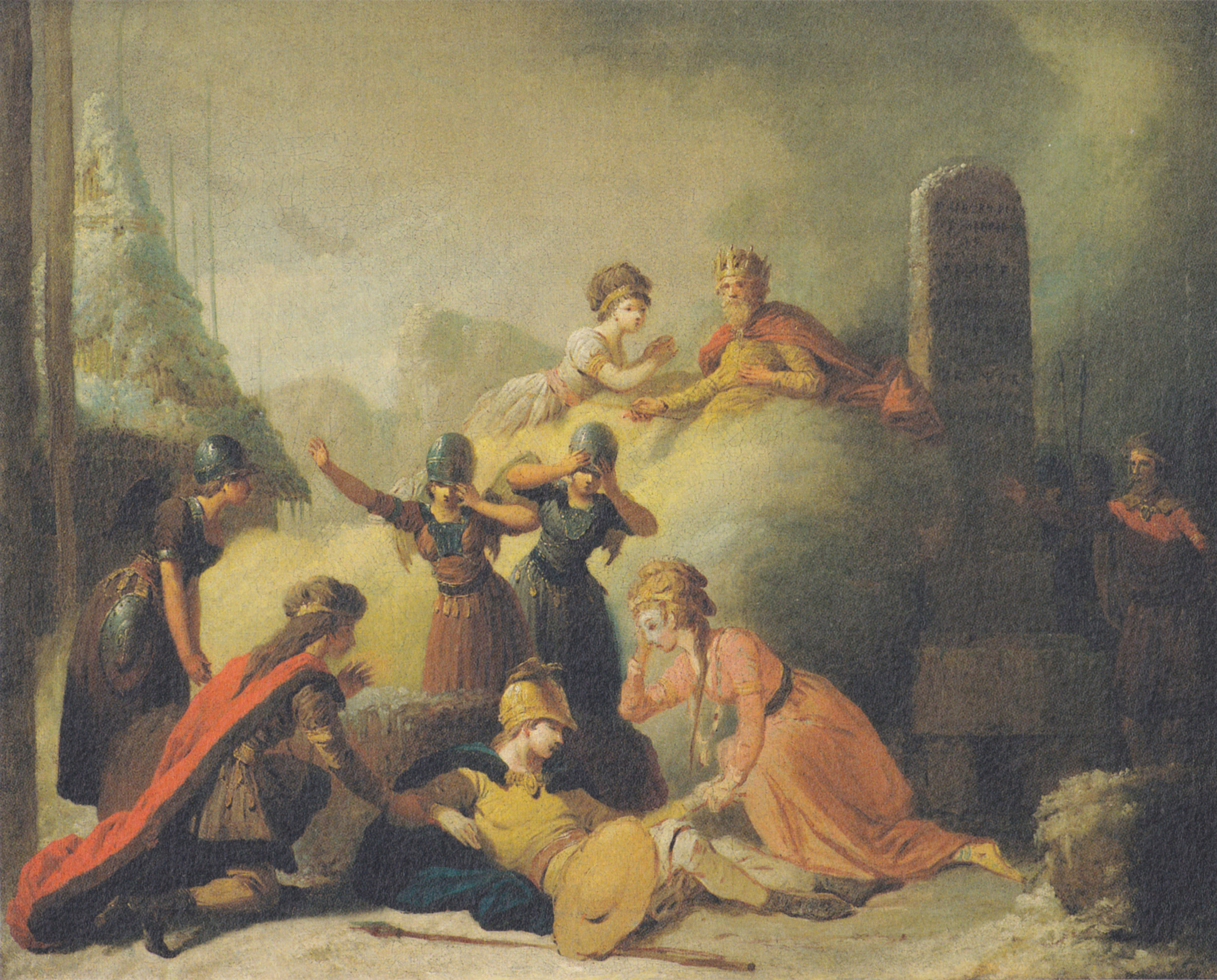
A scene from "Balders Død" by Johannes Ewald, 1779.

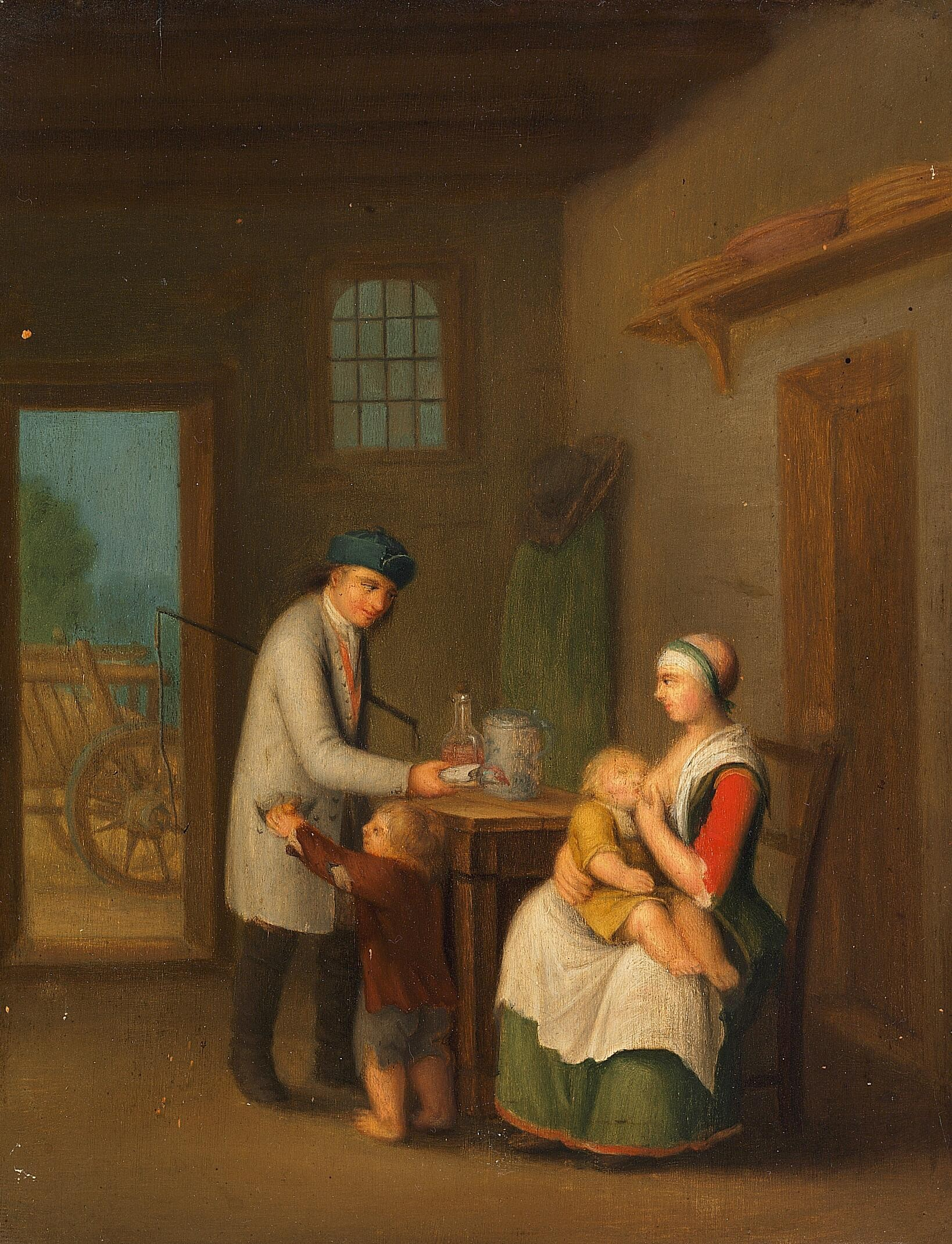
Bondestueinterior med mor, der ammer sit barn og lille dreng, der tager godter op af faderens lomme.

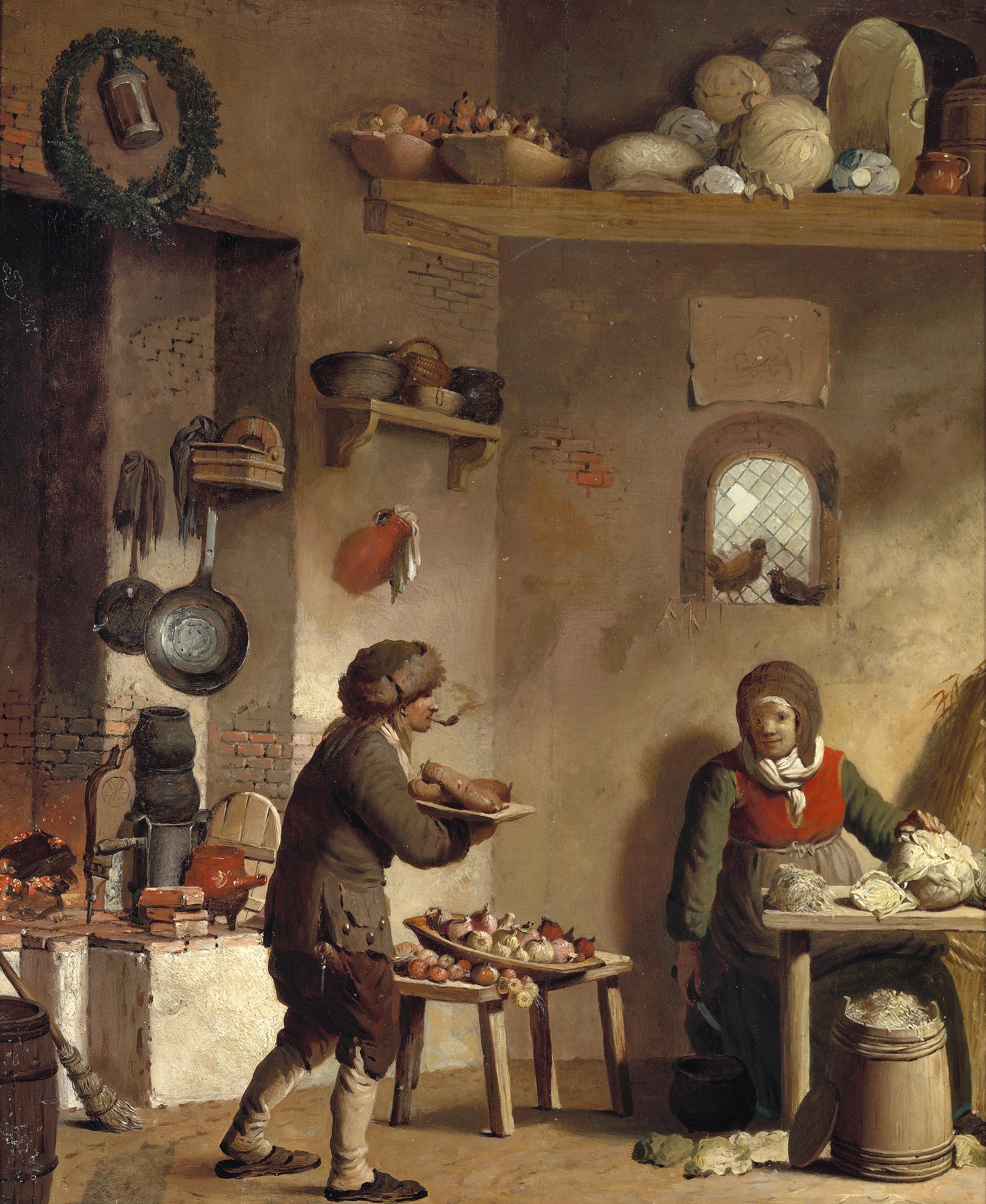
Køkkenscene, c. 1718.

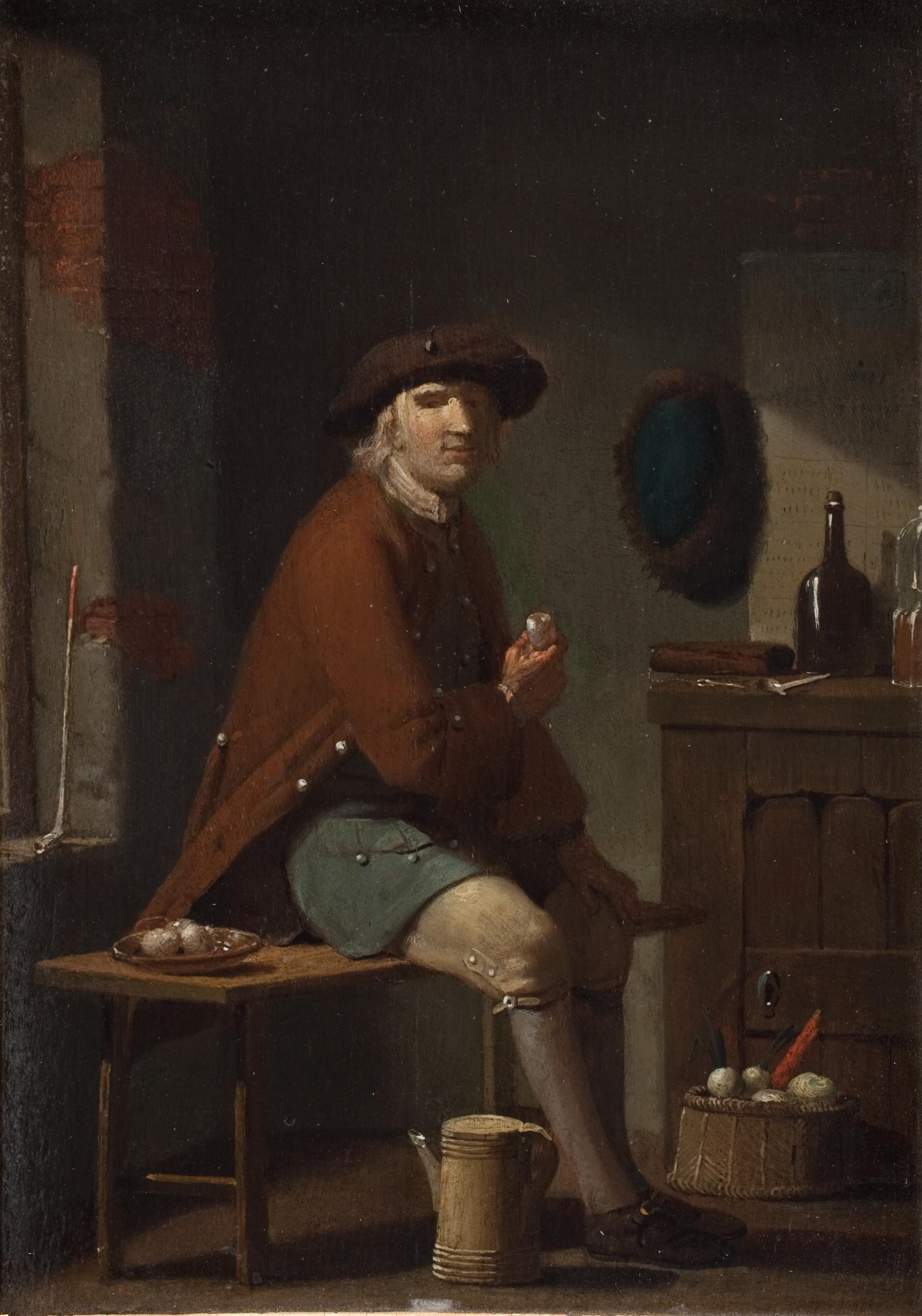
Piberygende mand, oil on wood.

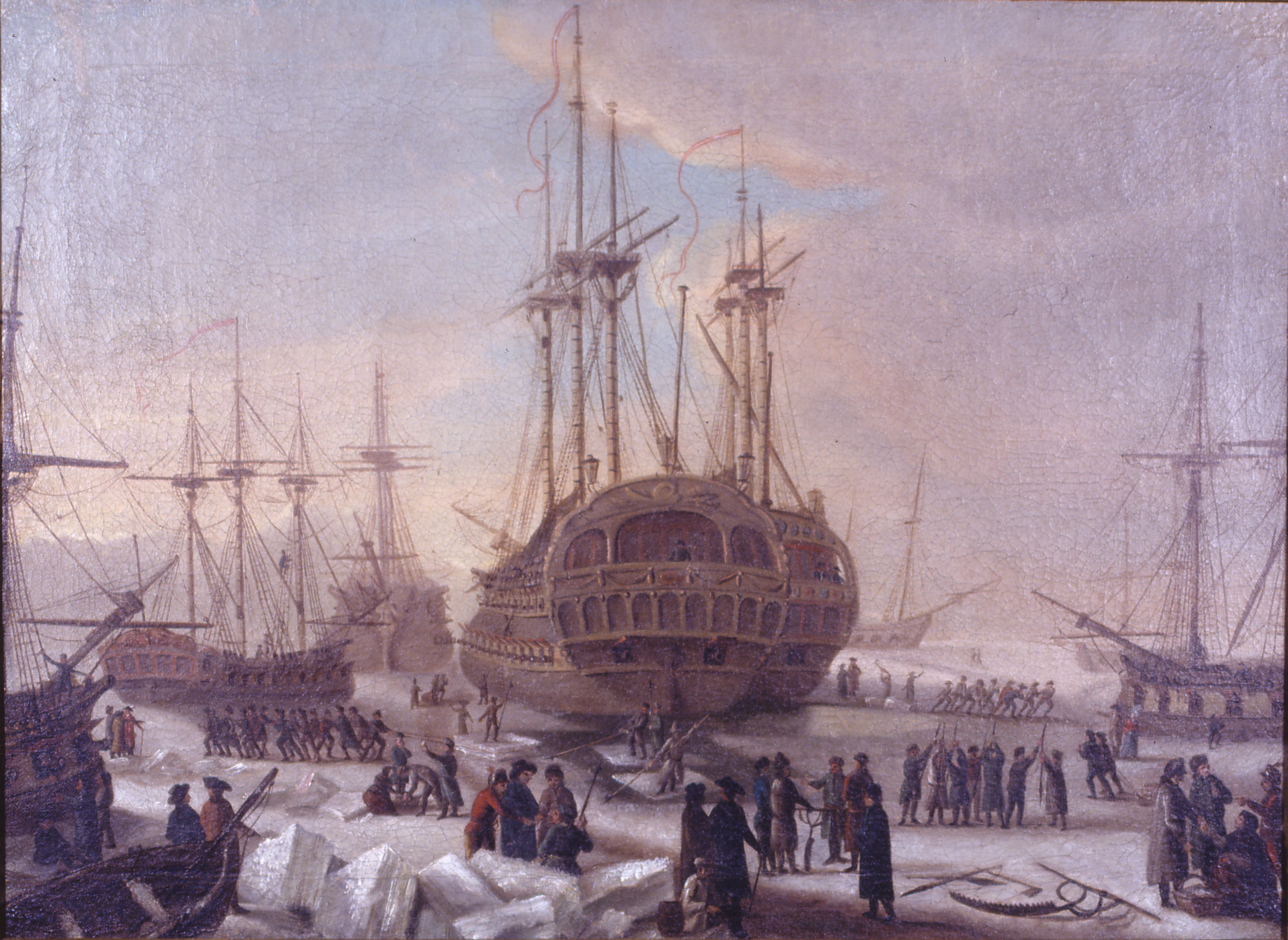
Dansk eskadre udises af Københavns havn før afsejling til Algier, 1770.
