= Sparekassen for Roskilde By og Omegn =

Danish savings banks

- Company type: Savings bank
- Industry: Financial services
- Founded: November 3, 1835
- Founder: Johannes Hage
- Defunct: 1987
- Fate: Merged
- Successor: Sparekassen Bikuben
- Headquarters: Roskilde, Denmark
- Products: Savings accounts, mortgages

Sparekassen for Roskilde By og Omegn was a Danish savings bank based in Roskilde, Denmark.

== History ==
The savings bank was founded on 3 November 1835 at the initiative of chief physician Johannes Hage (1800–1837). The bank was initially based in the Roskilde City Hall. In 1877, it relocated to a new building at Stændertorvet 4.

Over the years, the savings bank grew to become one of the Denmarklargest provincial savings banks. In 1987, a combination of failed fund dispositions and other factors led to a need for financial consolidation. In 1987, it merged with Horsens Sparekasse and Østjyske egns-sparekasse under the name DK-Sparekassen. However, it soon became clear that the merger did not lead to the desired result, the following year this was openly acknowledged and new opportunities were sought. The result was a merger in 1989 with Sparekassen Bikuben.

== Building ==
The building from 1866 was designed by Johan Daniel Herholdt. It was later expanded several times. In 1977, it was replaced by a modern building. The new building comprised Algade 5–7 and the southern part of Palæstræde's south side.
