= Carl Wesenberg-Lund =

Danish zoologist and freshwater ecologist (1867–1955)

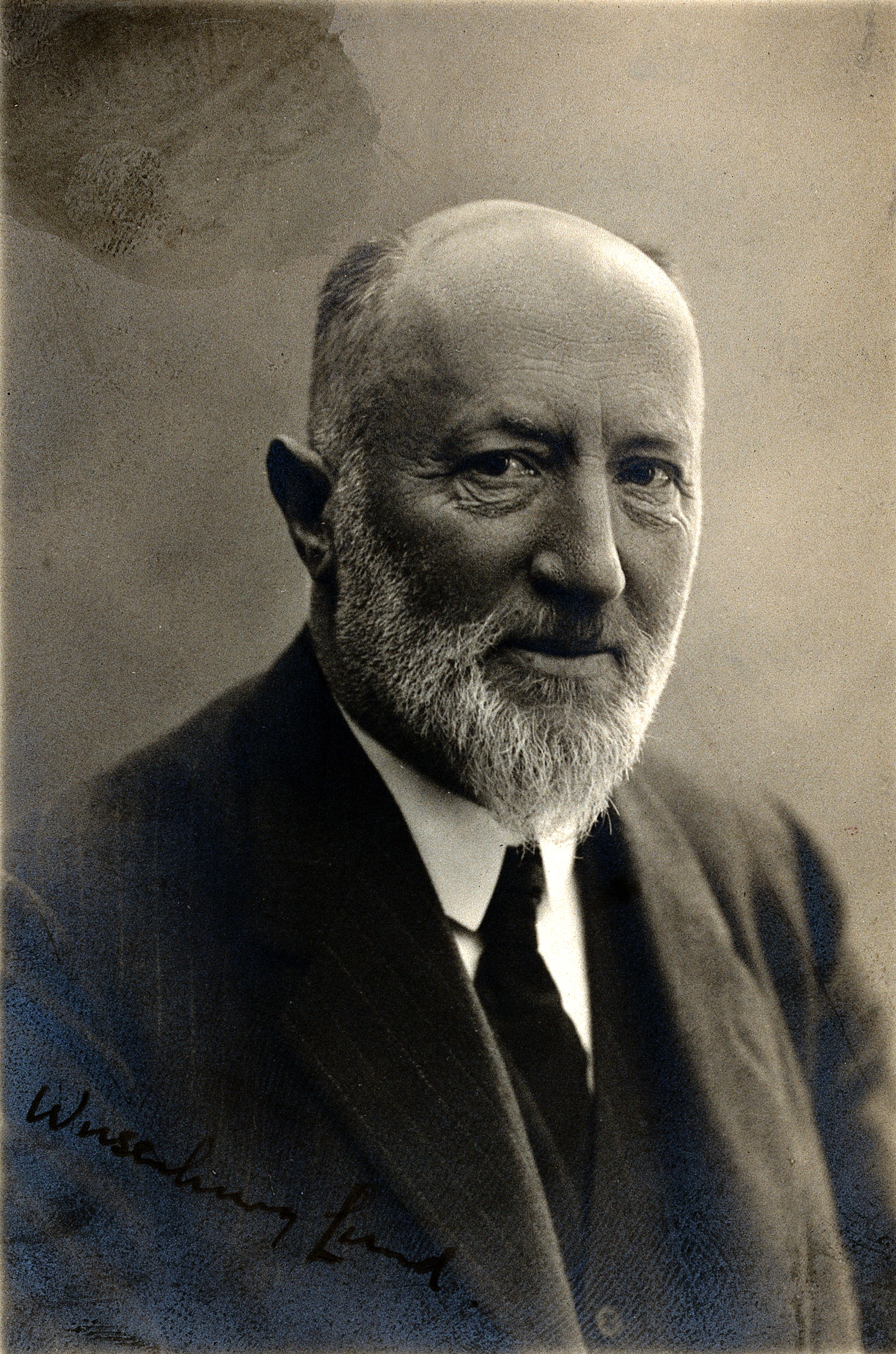

Carl Jørgen Wesenberg-Lund (December 22, 1867 – November 12, 1955), D.Phil, professor of limnology 1922-1939 at the University of Copenhagen, was a Danish zoologist and freshwater ecologist. He was a pioneer in Danish nature conservation early in the 20th century. He was a member of the Royal Danish Academy of Sciences and Letters from 1918. He was a member of many foreign academies and learned societies, e.g. honorary fellow of the Royal Society in London, corresponding member of the Zoological Society of London and of the Quekett Microscopical Club in London. He became honorary doctor at Uppsala University in 1932 and Commander 1st Degree of the Order of the Dannebrog.
