= Søholm Keramik =

Former manufacturer in Rønne, Denmark

Søholm Keramik was a ceramics manufacturer in Rønne on the island of Bornholm, Denmark. It existed from 1835 to 1996.

== History ==
Søholm was founded by Edvard Christian Sonne and Herman Sonne Wolffsen in 1835. Herman Sonne Wolffsen ran the pottery until his death in 1887. Much of the production was then unsigned. The pottery was operated by Hans Ancher Wolffsen and his brother in 1887-1908 They adopted the popular jugendstil with its often grotesque shapes.

The Carl Møller managed the pottery for the Wolffsen family from 1908 and became its owner in 1912. The outbreak of World War I resulted in difficult times for the company and Møller in 1919 Nøller sold it to a businessman from Copenhagen but continued as a manager.

The company was in 1929 sold to Bornholm Municipality and leased to a consortium consisting of Holst & Knudsen and Keramisk Forbund. Keramisk Forbund purchased the factory in 1933, following a period with fierce criticism of the public ownership among right-wing parties in the town council. Keramisk Forbund was merged into SID in 1988. In 1989, Søjolm Keramik relocated to a new factory at Lillevangsvej 6 in the outskirts of Rønne. SID closed the factory on 1 February 1996.

== Legacy ==
Ceramics from Søholm is a common sight in Danish antique shops and flea markets.
