= The Improvisatore =

1835 novel by H. C. Andersen

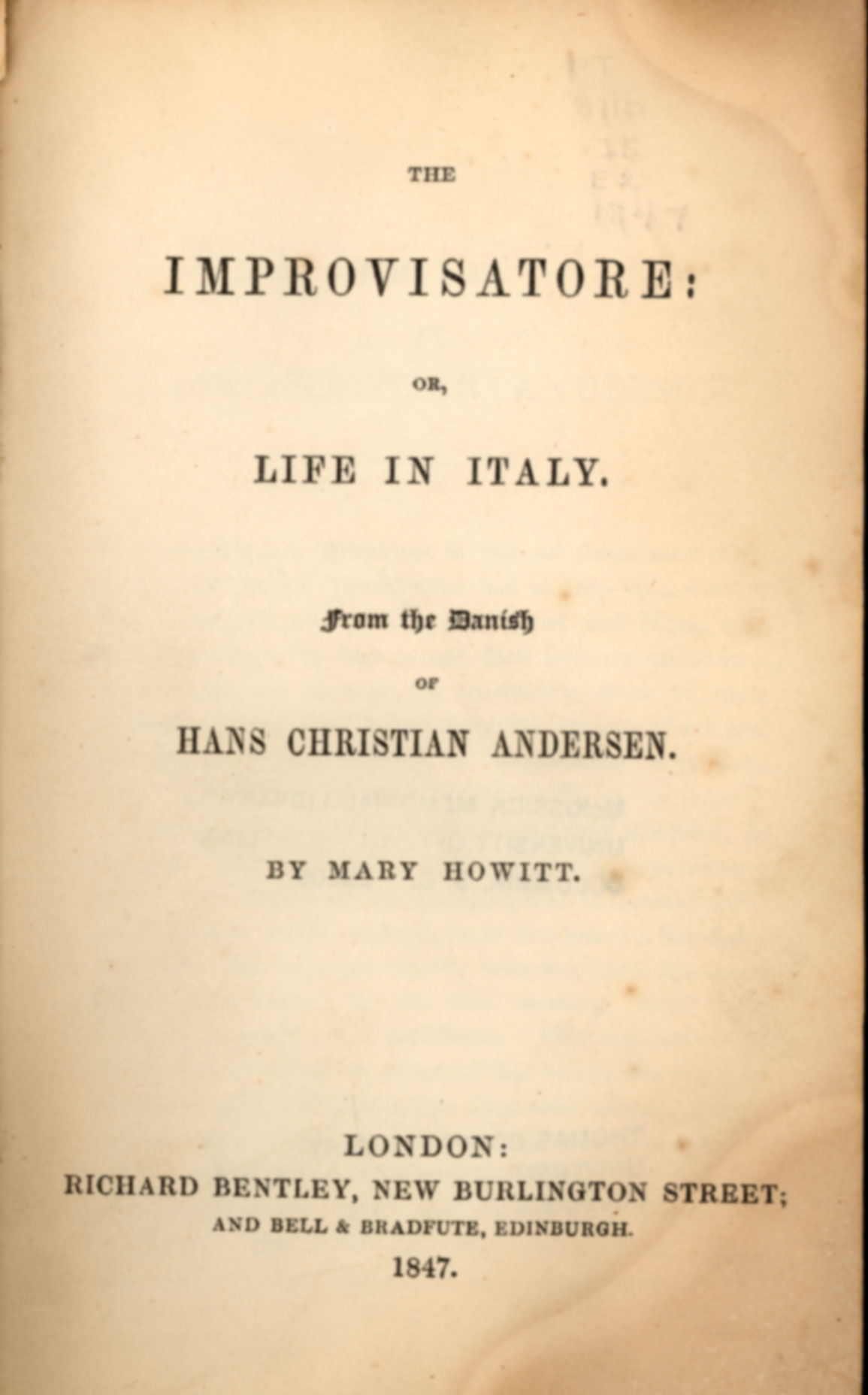
- Title page of the first English edition
- Author: Hans Christian Andersen
- Original title: Improvisatoren
- Translator: Mary Howitt
- Language: Danish
- Genre: Autobiographical novel
- Publisher: Reitzels Forlag
- Publication date: 1835
- Publication place: Denmark
- English publication date: 1847
- Media type: Print

The Improvisatore (Danish: Improvisatoren) is an autobiographical novel by Hans Christian Andersen (1805–1875). First published in 1835, it was an immediate success and is considered to be Andersen's breakthrough. The story, reflecting Andersen's own travels in Italy in 1833, reveals much about his own life and aspirations as experienced by Antonio, the novel's principal character.

== Background ==
In September 1833, with financial support from Danish well-wishers, Andersen embarked on a cultural trip to Italy. Deeply impressed with everything he experienced and influenced by Madame de Staël's Corinne ou l'Italie, he began writing his travel tale, The Improvisatore. It was published by Reitzels Forlag in 1835. An immediate success and Andersen's breakthrough, the following year it was published in Germany and, in 1838, in France. For many years, The Improvisatore was the most widely read of all of Andersen's works.

== Plot ==
In this fictionalized autobiography, the hero Antonio does not arrive as a tourist but grows up in Italy, thus able to show not just the sunny side of life but also some of its shadows. In its structure, the novel reflects Andersen's own life and his travels through Italy. The descriptions of the Italian towns and regions are particularly captivating, expressed in the author's colourful language. Like Andersen himself, Antonio comes from a poor background but fights his way through various crises and amorous relationships until he is finally successful. The last improvisation involves a fishing boat accident in which many lose their lives. But finally Antonio becomes the happy husband of the beautiful young Lara as well as a landowner in Calabria.

== Editions ==
- Andersen, Hans Christian (1835). Improvisatoren, Original Roman i to Dele. Copenhagen: Reitzels Forlag.
- Andersen, Hans Christian (1847). "The Improvisatore: or, Life in Italy". Translated by Mary Howitt. R. Bentley.
- Andersen, Hans Christian (2018). The Improvisatore: A Novel of Italy. Translated by Hugus, Frank. Minneapolis, MN: University of Minnesota Press.
