= Carl Jensen Burrau =

Danish mathematician (1867–1944)

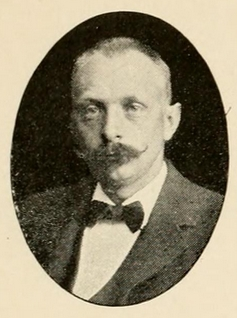

Carl Jensen Burrau (29 July 1867 – 8 October 1944) was a Danish mathematician who worked on problems relating to physics and astronomy while also working as an actuary.

Burrau was born in Helsingör (Elsinore), Denmark and was educated at Copenhagen University. He worked as an astronomy assistant at the university observatory from 1893 to 1898. He is known for his work on a three-body problem, examining the orbits of two equal masses revolving about each other. His collaborations with Törvald Thiele led to the so-called Thiele–Burrau method. His dissertation of 1895 examines methods of identifying constants from photographs of star positions using Bessel's classic method. He then worked on actuarial mathematics, writing a book on the subject, Forsikringsstatistikens Grundlag (1925), and taught applied mathematics at Copenhagen university.
