= Andreas Andersen Feldborg =

Danish writer

- Born: 9 September 1782; Copenhagen, Denmark
- Died: 4 August 1838 (aged 55); Danzig
- Citizenship: Danish
- Education: Copenhagen University
- Occupation: Writer
- Writing career
- Language: Danish

Andreas Andersen Feldborg (9 September 1782 – 4 August 1838) was a Danish author. He was the son of a distiller, with the same name and was born in Copenhagen, Denmark 9 September 1782.

== Life ==
He went to Copenhagen University in 1798, taking the philology exam in 1799 and in 1800 the Philosophicum exam. Without Friends, without hope and without bread, he left Denmark in 1802 and traveled to England, where he long resided, often under distress. He contributed to the spread of knowledge regarding Danish Literature and Danish conditions, so he composed a Description Battle of the Red Copenhagen 1801, published in London 1805, he translated Hellfrieds impartial, Manufacture of England's attack on Denmark in 1807 (London 1809), which had almost torn him of his civil relations in the Land, Country where he almost was stuck; than more localized he, in English Mallings' Great and good deeds ", a Collection Danish poems, etc. - In 1810 he visited Denmark and collected here a considerable sum of money to support the Danish prisoners in England. Then he traveled in Norway and Sweden, stayed again from 1816-20 in his native land, during which time he was Oehlenschläger, Teacher in English, was then again some years in England, 1821-24 when he published a description of Denmark, "Denmark delineated", in 3 volumes, and from here he went on a journey to France, Belgium, the Netherlands and Germany. In 1828 he joined as a teacher of English at the University of Göttingen, and 4th Aug 1838 he died in Danzig. – He was "a strange fellow", a literary Vagabond without further significance, and he led after Molbech Words 'A strange and quite romantic Food'.

== Sources ==
=== Books ===
Bricka, Carl Frederik (1891). DANSK BIOGRAFISK LEXIKON (in Danish). Vol. V. BIND Faaborg - Gersdorff. Copenhagen: Kjøbenhavn. Gyldendalske Boghandels Forlag (F. Hegel & Søn).
