= Marie Rée =

Danish newspaper publisher

Anne Marie Elisabeth Rée (1835-1900) was a Danish newspaper publisher who ran Aalborg's local newspaper, Aalborg Stiftstidende, from 1868 (alone from 1872) until her death.

She was the daughter of the editor Peter Seedorff. In 1852, when 17, she married Bernhard Rée, a friend of her father and the paper's editor. Her husband died in 1868, when she was only 33. As a result, she inherited the newspaper together with another female member, Jensine Borch. She was involved from 1868 onward, though initially left the daily management to her employed editor Emil Carlsen, and shared responsibility with Borch. She was however actively involved from the start, showed great interest and proved to be an able editor, and when Borch died in 1872, she assumed full and sole responsibility for the paper.

Under her leadership and her support for the Venstre political party, the paper became critical of the government in office. As a result, she was forced to take a more moderate approach although from the 1880s, she openly supported votes for women and published articles in support of women's rights.
