= Ole Johansen Winstrup =

Danish engineer and inventor

Ole Johansen Winstrup (12 August 1782 - 20 December 1867) was a self-taught Danish engineer and inventor.

== Early life ==
Winstrup was born on 12 August 1782 at Winstrup, Holbæk County, the son of smallholder Johan Hansen (c. 1749–1810) and Anna Hansdatter (c. 1754–93). He moved to Copenhagen in 1799 where he trained as a miller and mill builder. In 1804–11, he served as a Royal Life Guard.

== Career ==
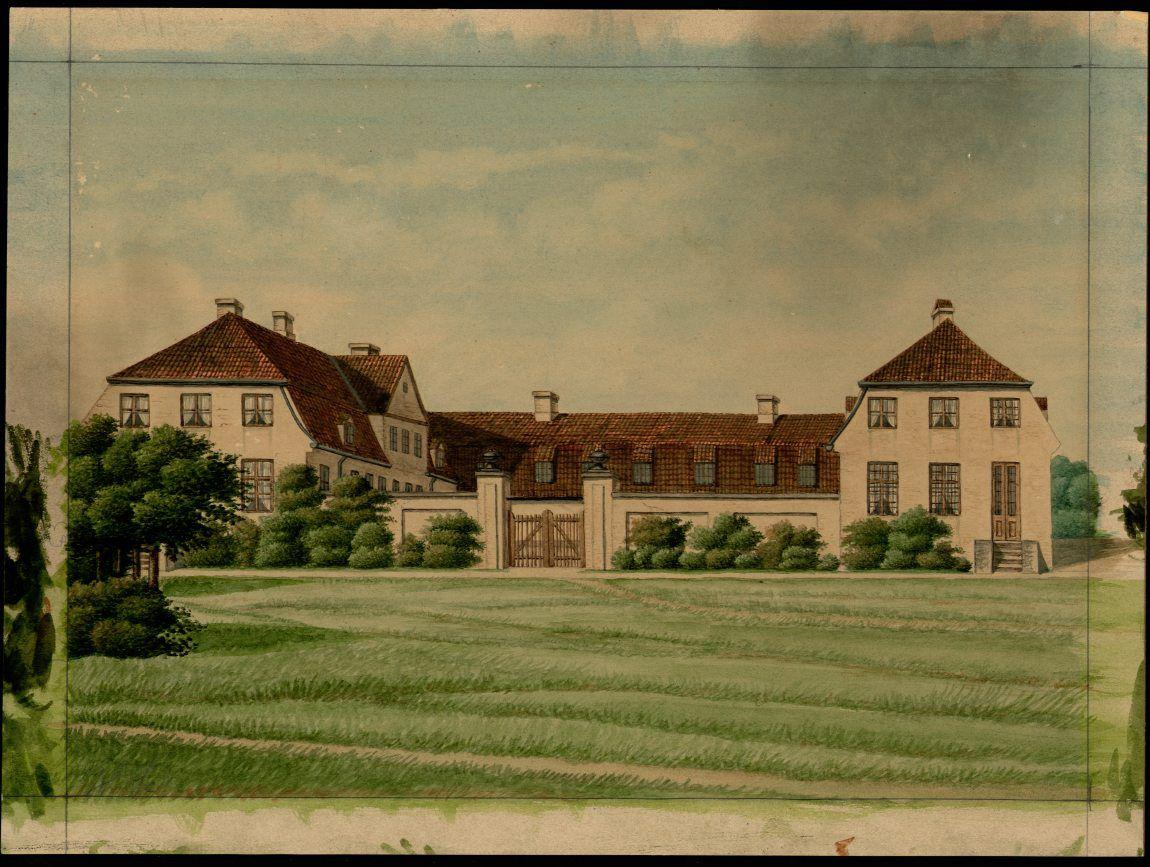
Mariaslyst seen from the east, c. 1845

In 181, Winstrup established his own workshop. He acquired the property Mariaslyst at the far end of Vesterbrogade as a new home for his venture which specialized in the manufacture of agricultural machinery.

Winstrup created an eight-volume illustrated work on agricultural machines in 1822-26 (published 1824–26). In this connection he went on a study trip to Germany where he met Johann Gottlob Nathusius in Althaldensleben. He bought one of Nathusiuss's factories and operated it from 1824 to 1928. In 1826, he manufactured a steam engine for a brewery in Copenhagen, notable for being the first steam engine made by a person from Denmark. In 1827, he was licensed to establish an iron foundry in Copenhagen. In 1829 he was also licensed to build a windmill at the site and in 1834 to establish a steam mill.

When the College of Advanced Technology was established in 1829, he was appointed as the first leader of its workshops but left the post again in 1831.

== Personal life ==
Winstrup married Ane Margrethe Hanberg (c. 1784-10 November 1852) on 11 June 1813 in Frederiksberg. He was the father of P. J. Winstrup. He was awarded the Cross of Honour in 1811. He died on 20 December 1867 and is buried at Frederiksberg Cemetery.

== 1808 submarine ==
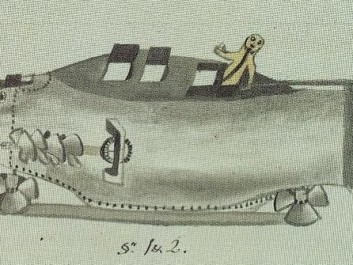
One of Winstrup's renderings of "The Whale"

In 1808, Winstrup started to build a model of a propeller-driven submarine that he named 'Hvalfisken (The Whale)'. It was about ten metres long and could move up and down using propellers connected to axles and cogwheels.

A diver on board the submarine would be able to climb out of and drill holes in the submarine's hull, so the vessel would sink and hence form a barrier against naval attack. Winstrup's patent application was rejected by the patent authorities due to technical shortcomings.
