= Vigilius Eriksen =

Danish painter (1722–1782)

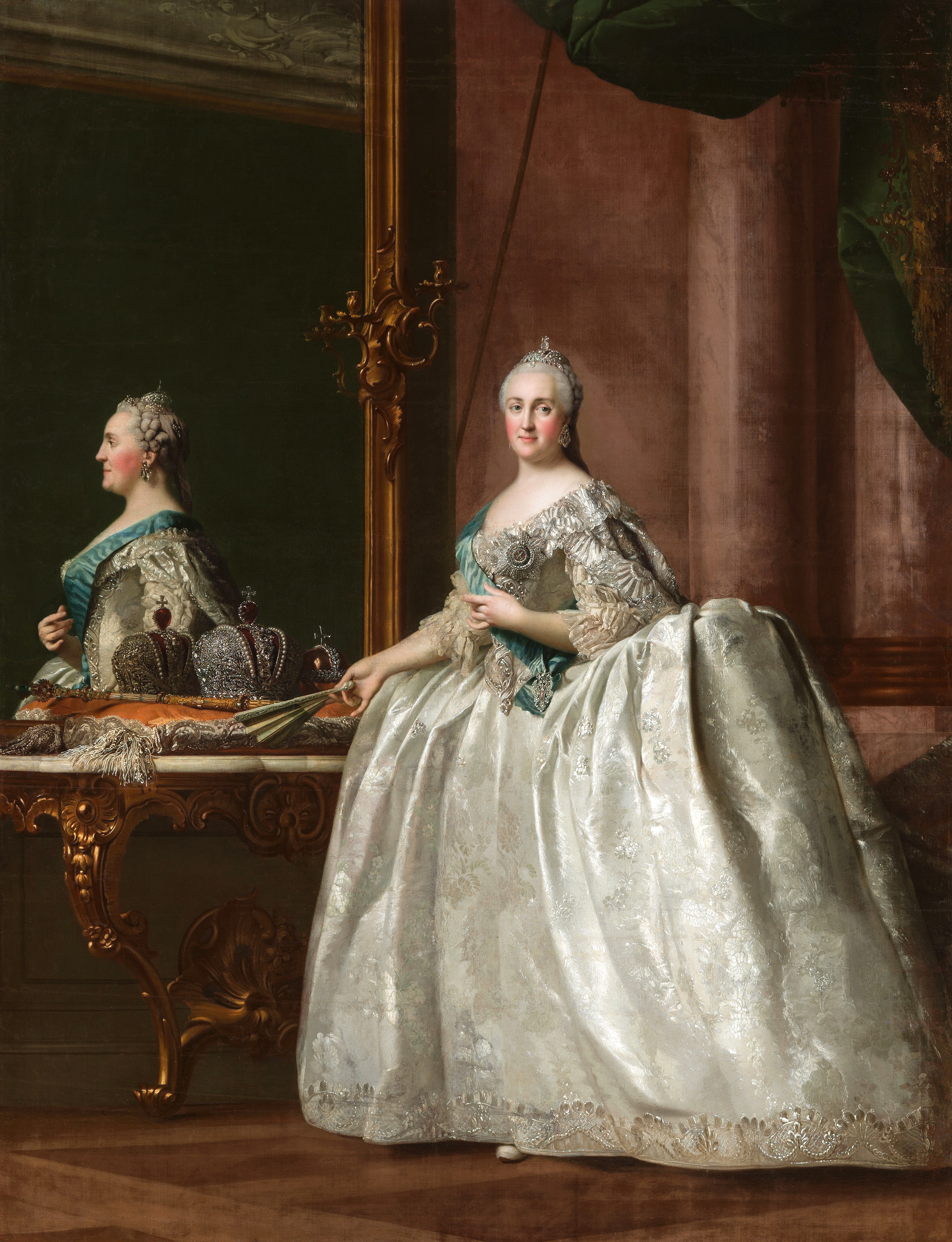
Catherine the Great of Russia in front of a mirror

Vigilius Eriksen (2 September 1722 in Copenhagen – 25 May 1782 in Rungstedgård) was a Danish painter. He was the royal portraitist to Christian VI of Denmark.

== Biography ==
He initially studied under Johann Salomon Wahl. In 1755 he was awarded a gold medal in painting at the Royal Danish Academy of Fine Arts, but was denied entry into the institution. He quickly developed a reputation for his portraits, and between 1757 and 1772 he traveled and worked in Saint Petersburg where he became the imperial court painter. He painted several portraits of Catherine the Great, as well as other royals.

After a number of lucrative commissions, Eriksen returned to Denmark to continue his work as a royal portraitist. He was now some years busy, painting several times Dowager Queen Juliana Maria and Prince Frederick. In the collection at Rosenborg are a few works by him: image in pastel of Juliana Maria; portrait of Lorenz Spengler an art turner; one Caroline Mathilde with her son on her lap, attributed also Eriksen. Also a series of miniature enamel paintings that included ones of Frederick V as well as Catherine the Great.

Eriksen was recognized as a considerable portrait painter during his time. What is especially cherished about him was his excellent reproduction of his subjects. There were even enthusiastic admirers of him who compared him with Titian: "You Eriksen even in just Rank must find - with Titian, Urbin, even with Angelo". The Academy, which in his youth had rejected him, he stepped not in any relationship, but he was pleased to be appointed as counselor like the Academy directors when they departed. In his last years Eriksen seems to have worked little. In May 1782 he was attacked by an inflammatory fever, which led to his death on 25 May. His widow, Ida Christine née Basse Bech, survived him for many years and died in 1809.

== Sources ==
- Biography at the Dansk biografisk Lexikon
- Leo Swane: "Erichsen, Vigilius"; in: Jesper Engelstoft (Ed.): Verdens billedkundst indtil 1800; Politikens Forlag, København 1955; pg.247
- Vigilius Eriksen @ Kunstindeks Danmark
