= Bornholms Avis =

Defunct Danish newspaper

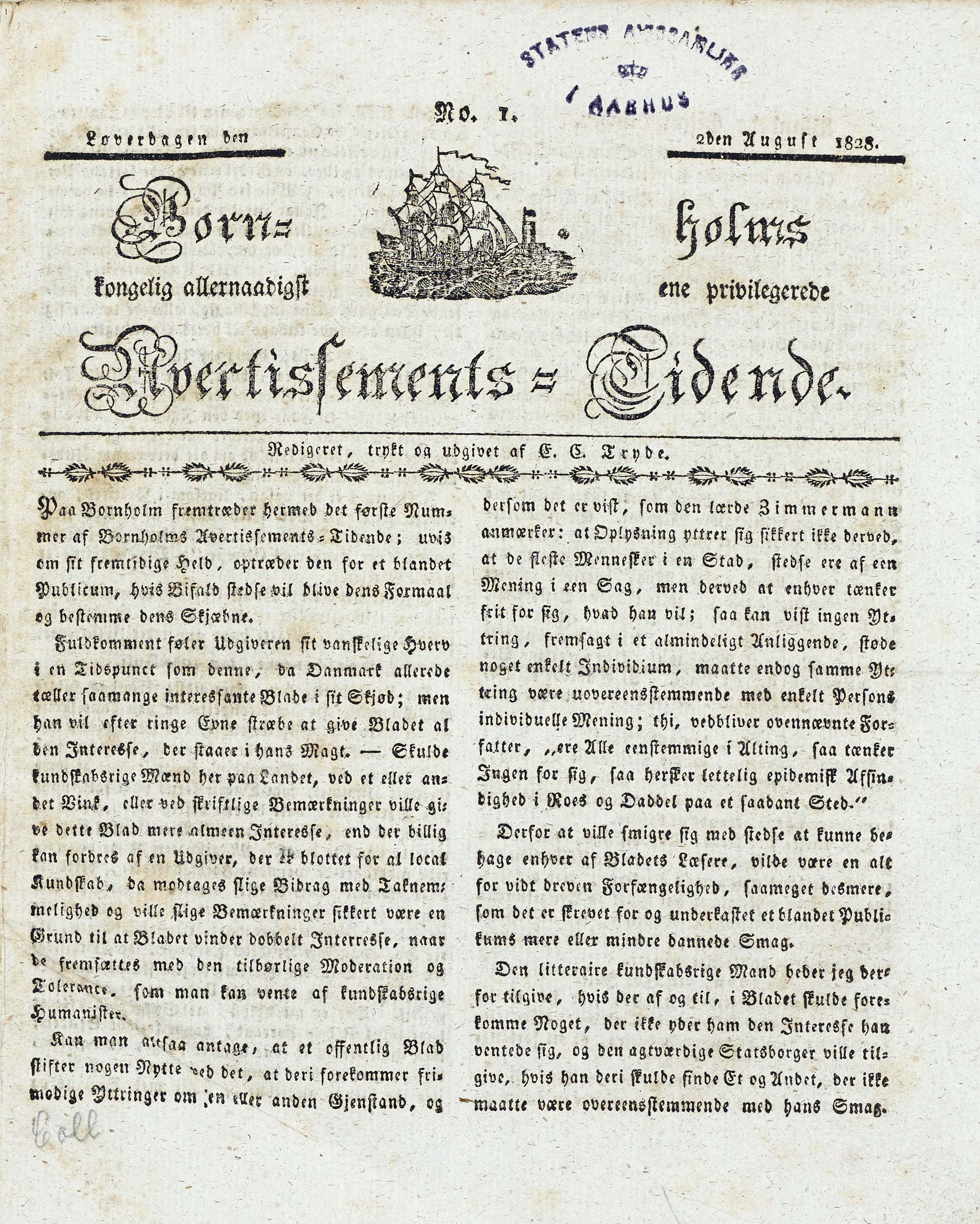
Frontpage of Bornholms Avis, 1828.

Bornholms Avis was a regional newspaper published from 1828 to 1957 on the island of Bornholm, Denmark.

== History ==
The newspaper was established on 2 August 1828 by the printer E. C. Tryde (1797–1868). After the founder's death, it passed to his son, F. V. Tryde (1838–1909), who owned it until his own death, with the exception of the period from 1890 to 1899, when the newspaper was taken over by a limited company. In 1880, it was merged with the competing local newspaper Bornholms Amtstidendeøø (founded 1854). On 18 June 1919, Bornholms Avis was again taken over by a limited company. In 1945, G. Bjerg Møller (born 1916) became editor-in-chief. The newspaper closed in 1957.

== See also ==
- Sparekassen Bornholm
