= Sparekassen Bornholm =

- Formerly: Bornholms Spare- og Laanekasse i Rønne
- Company type: Savings bank
- Industry: Financial services
- Founded: February 24, 1844
- Founders: Heggelund, Hasselriis, P. Johnson, and O. P. Rasch
- Defunct: 1990
- Fate: Merged
- Successor: Sparekassen SDS
- Headquarters: Rønne, Denmark
- Products: Savings accounts, mortgages

Sparekassen Bornholm (originally Bornholms Spare- og Laanekasse i Rønne) was a Danish savings bank based in Rønne, Denmark.

== History ==
Rønne Savings Bank was established on 24 February 1844 by customs official Heggelund, teacher Hasselriis, consul P. Johnson and merchant O. P. Rasch.

It was not until 1864 that the savings bank really started to grow. A new main building was constructed on Store Torv in 1895. The building was designed by Mathias Bidstrup.

In 1990, Sparekassen Bornholm merged with Sparekassen SDS. Its reserves were transferred to Sparekassen Bornholms Fond, a new charitable foundation established on 28 February 1990.
