= Frue Plads =

Square in Copenhagen, Denmark

Coordinates: 55.6796°N 12.5725°E

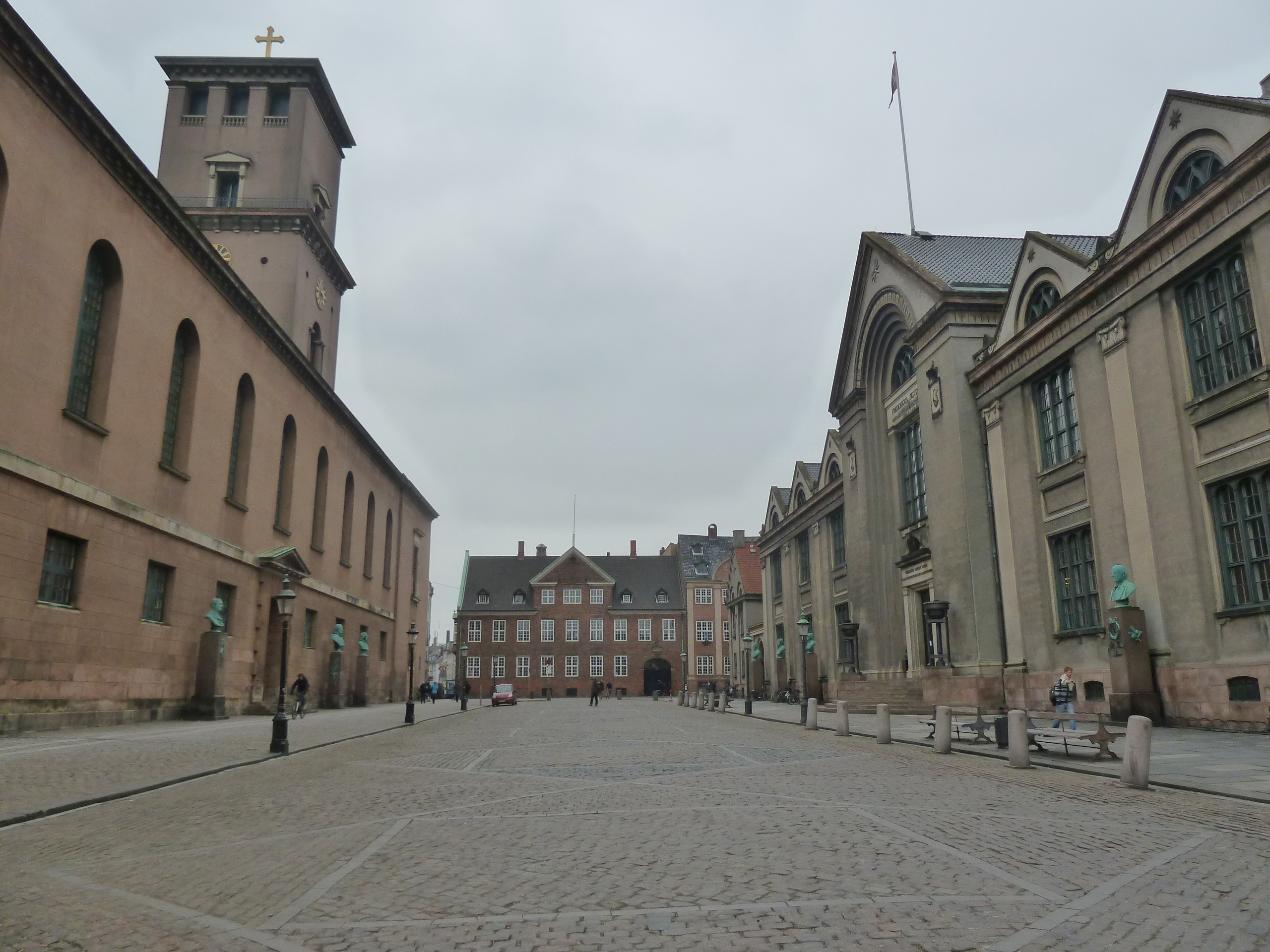
Frue Plads viewed from Fiolstræde

Frue Plads (literally "Square of (Our) Lady") is a public square located on the north side of the Church of Our Lady in central Copenhagen, Denmark. It occupies a rectangular space which is bounded on the other sides by University of Copenhagen's main building to the north, Nørregade to the west and pedestrianized Fiolstræde to the east.

== History ==
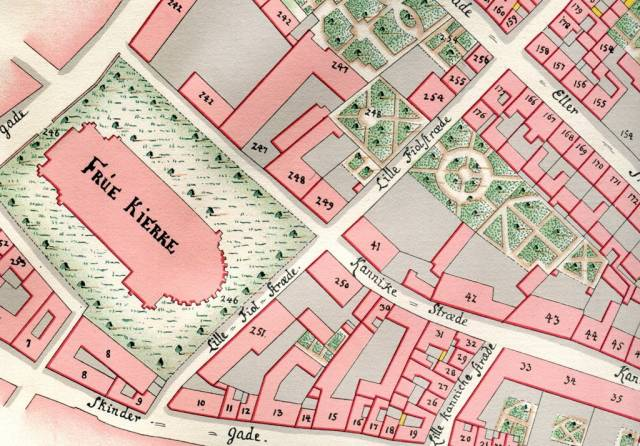
The site seen on Gedde's maps of Copenhagen from 1757

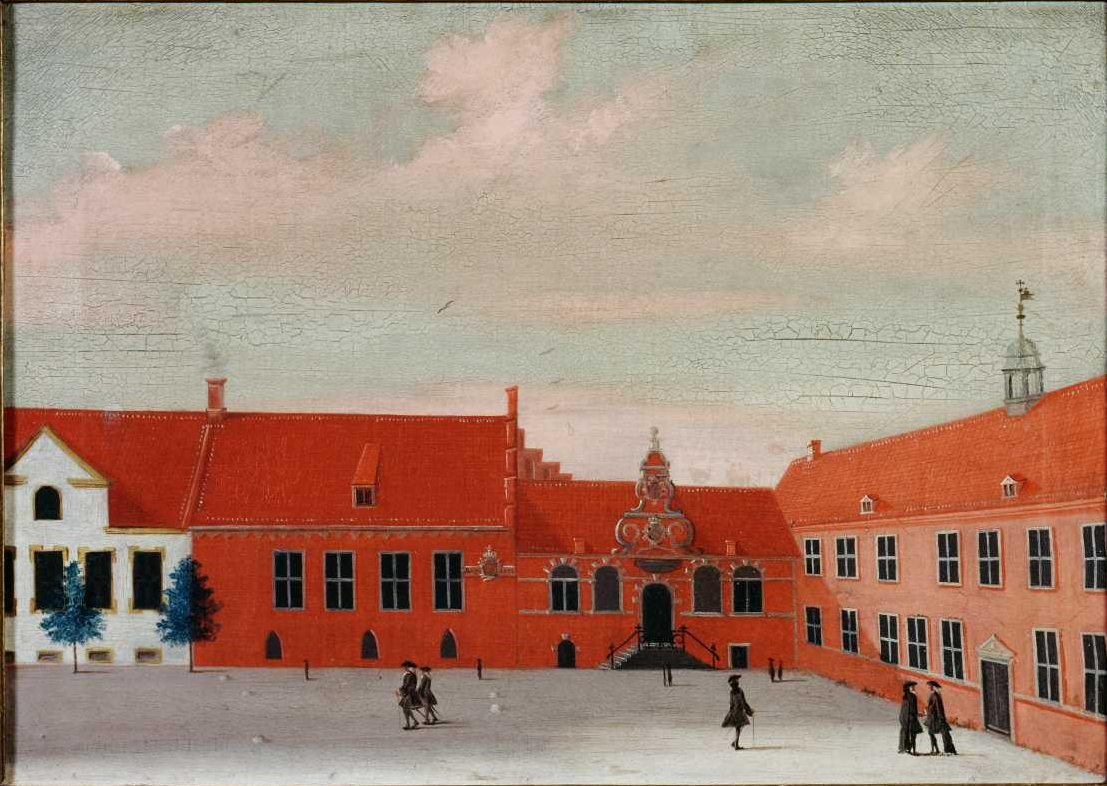
Painting by Rach/Eegberg, 1749, showing Our Lady's Square with the Consistory Building and the Professor's House, now found to the rear of the university's main building

In the Middle Ages, Our Lady's Square was located a little further to the north while the current square occupies the grounds of Church of Our Lady's graveyard. A new residence for the Roskilde Bishops was built on the square in about 1420, shortly after Eric of Pomerania had taken over Copenhagen Castle. After the Reformation, University of Copenhagen took over the building complex. It was later expanded with various new buildings.

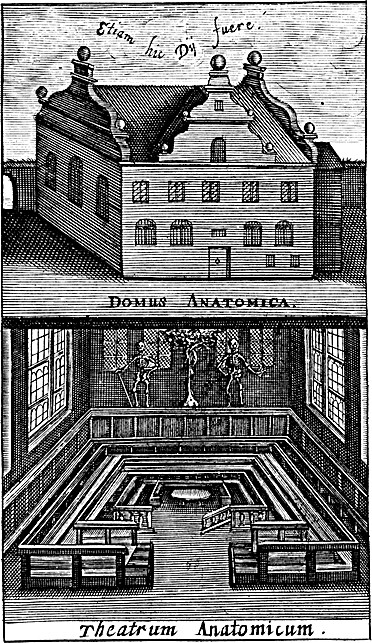
Domus Anatomica depicted in Thomas Bartholin's Cista medica Hafniensis from 1662

In 1644, Simon Paulli took the initiative of converting one of the university's buildings overlooking Church of Our Lady's graveyard into an anatomical theatre, Domus Anatomica, although Paulli did not hold his first public lecture until 3 March 1645. The building was completely destroyed in the Copenhagen Fire of 1728 and subsequently replaced by Theatrum Anatomico-chirurgicum on Købmagergade.

The British bombardment of Copenhagen on 3–5 September 1807 hit the area hard. Its main building and the professorial residences on the corners of Fiolstræde and Store Kannikestræde were destroyed by fire together with the church. It was subsequently decided not to reconstruct the graveyard but to create a new square in its place. Christian Frederik Hansen, who was responsible for the rebuilding of Church of Our Lady, was also charged with the design of a new building for Our Lady's School on Fiolstræde at the eastern end of the square. The school wished to change its name to Copenhagen Cathedral School but this was rejected after protests from Roskilde Cathedral School and the name was instead changed to Metropolitan School in 1917. The building was taken over by the university when the school moved to new premises in Nørrebro in the 1930s.

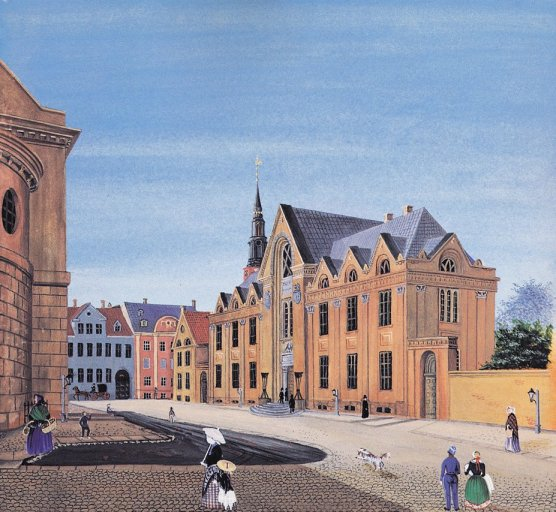
A gouache showing the university's new main building in 1860

Denmark's economy suffered greatly from the war with England and many public buildings needed to be rebuilt after the bombardment. The university therefore had to use Regensen and various other temporary premises around the city while they waited for a new home to be built. In 1819, Peder Malling, one of C. F. Hansen's students, was charged with the design of a new main building. His proposal was well received but far too expensive and in 1922 the project was once again put on hold. In 1829 when the plans were finally revived, it was in a somewhat scaled-downversion.

A set of bunkers was constructed in the square during World War II. They were removed after the war.

== Architecture ==
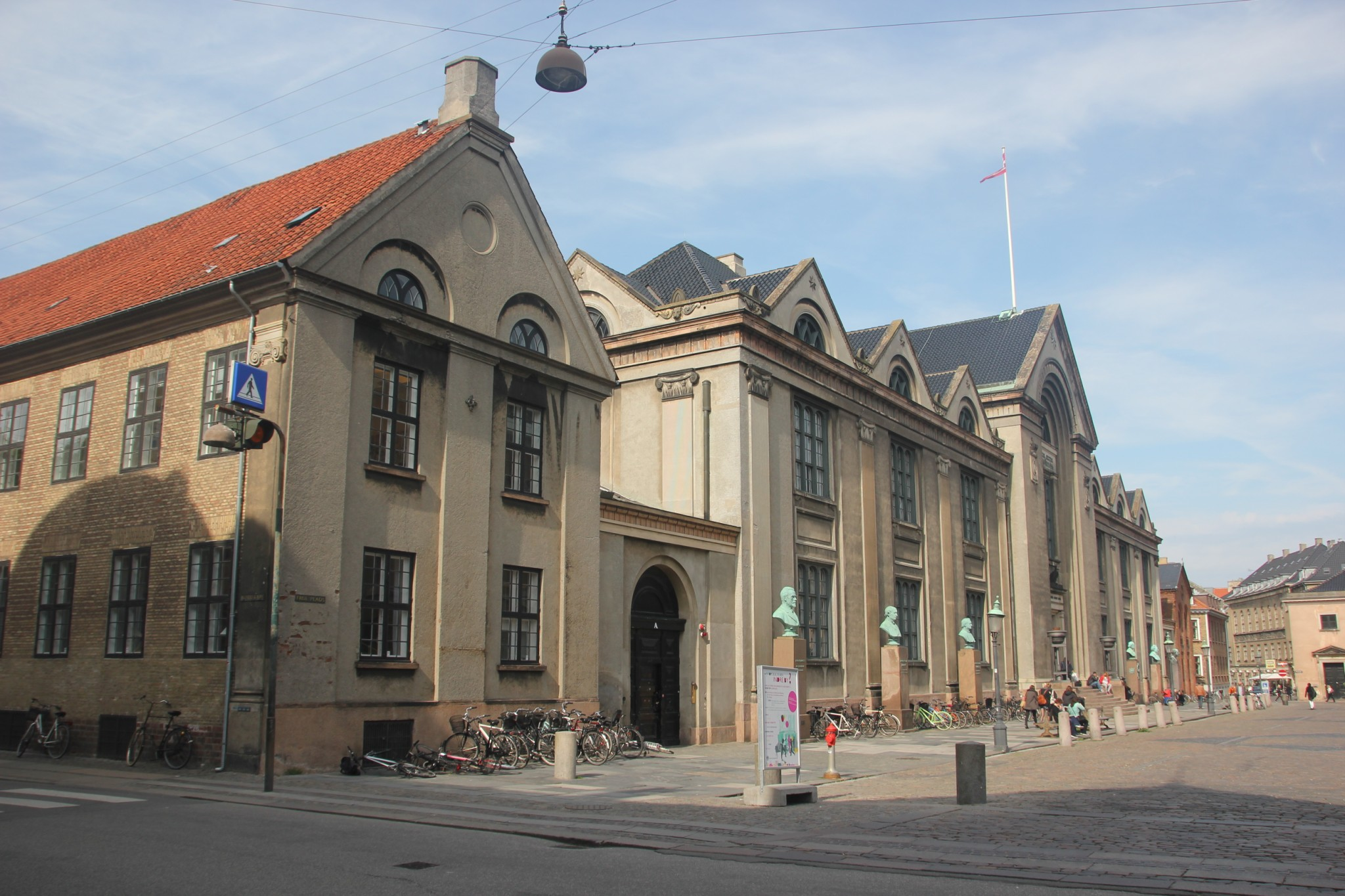
The university from Nørregade

Malling's main building for the university is built to a Neo-Gothic design. It is flanked by the gables of the Community Building (Kommunitetsbygningen) on Nørregade and Copenhagen University Library on Giolstræde. One of few buildings at the site that survived the bombardment in 1807, the former dates from the Middle Ages. In his design of the university library, which was completed in 1861, Johan Daniel Herholdt has tried to balance the gable on Frue Plads with that of the Community Building in terms of design and proportions.

The former Metropolitan School on Fiolstræde is now known as the Metropolitan Annex. It is a simple, Neoclassical building typical of C. F. Hansen's style. At the other end of the square, on Nørregade, is the Bishop's House where the Bishop of Copenhagen has his official residence and office.

== Sculptury ==
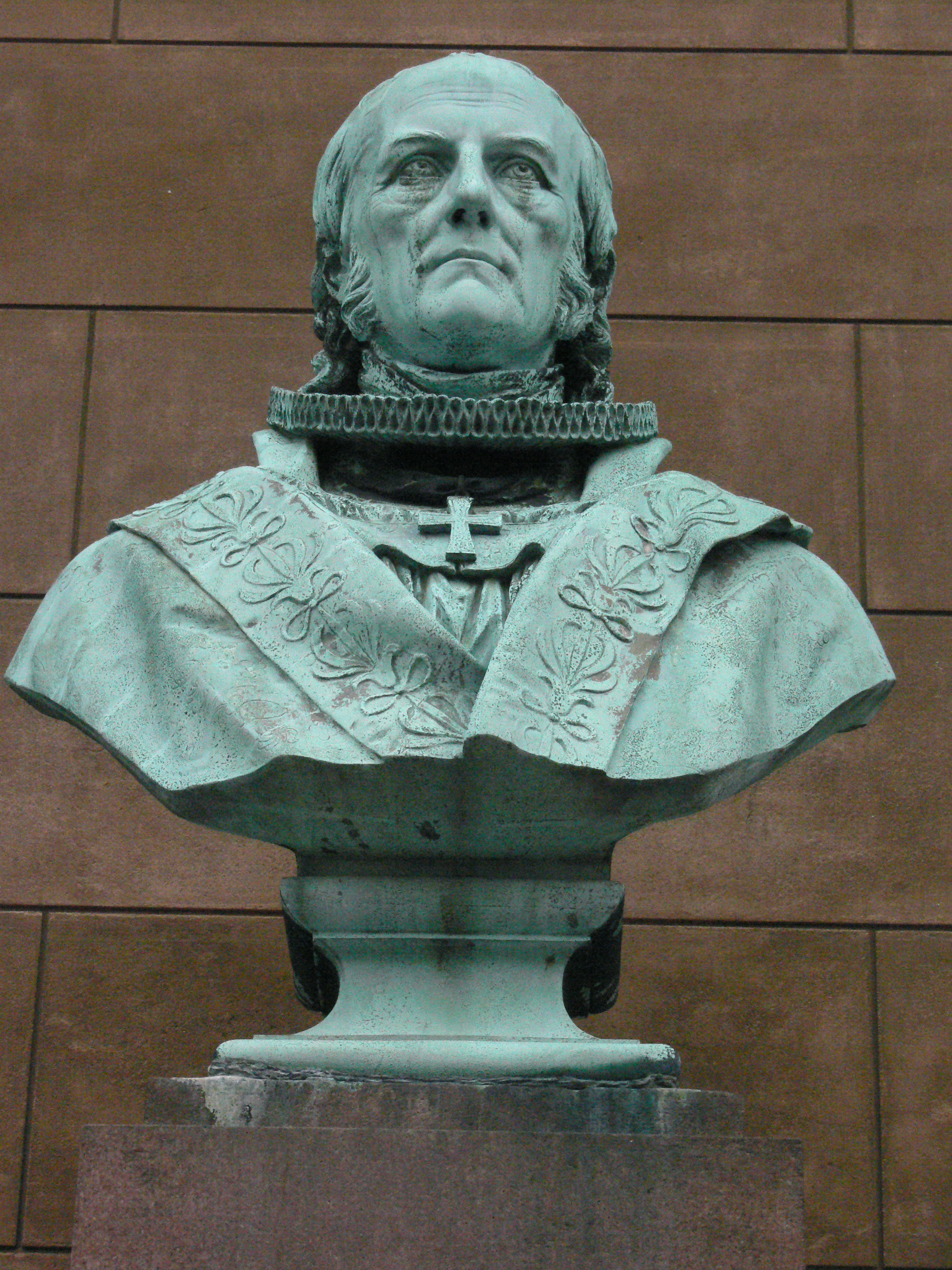
Bust of Jacob Peter Mynster

In front of the University's main building stand six bronze busts commemorating distinguished alumni, installed between 1856 and 1965 to honor their contributions to academia:

- Vilhelm Thomsen, linguist, 1842-1927

. The bust was created by L. Brandstrup in 1921 and installed on the square in 1929.

- Johan Nicolai Madvig, linguist, 1804–86. The bust was created by Vilhelm Bissen in 1874 and installed on the square in a larger version in 1887.
- Henrik Nicolai Clausen, theologian, 1793–1877. The bust was created by Vilhelm Bissen in 1858 and installed on the square in a larger version in 1878.
- Joakim Frederik Schouw, botanist, 1789–1852. Created by Vilhelm Bissen in 1851 and installed on the square in 1854.
- Japetus Steenstrup, zoologist, 1813–97. Created by Vilhelm Bissen in 1866 and installed on the square in a larger version in 1898.
- Niels Bohr, physicist, 1885–1962. Created by J. Gudmundsen-Holmgreen in 1957.

Another three busts are mounted on pillars along the south side of the square. They depict the composer Christoph Ernst Friedrich Weyse and the bishops Hans Lassen Martensen and Jacob Peter Mynster.

A new memorial dedicated to the scientist Inge Lehmann was installed on the square in 2017. The monument was designed by Elisabeth Toubro.

== Arts & craft market ==
Every year in August, since 1983, Frue Plads plays host to an annual arts & craft market, Kunsthåndværkermarkedet. It is the largest market of its kind in Denmark, featuring 130 professional artists and craftsmen in 2013.

== Image gallery ==
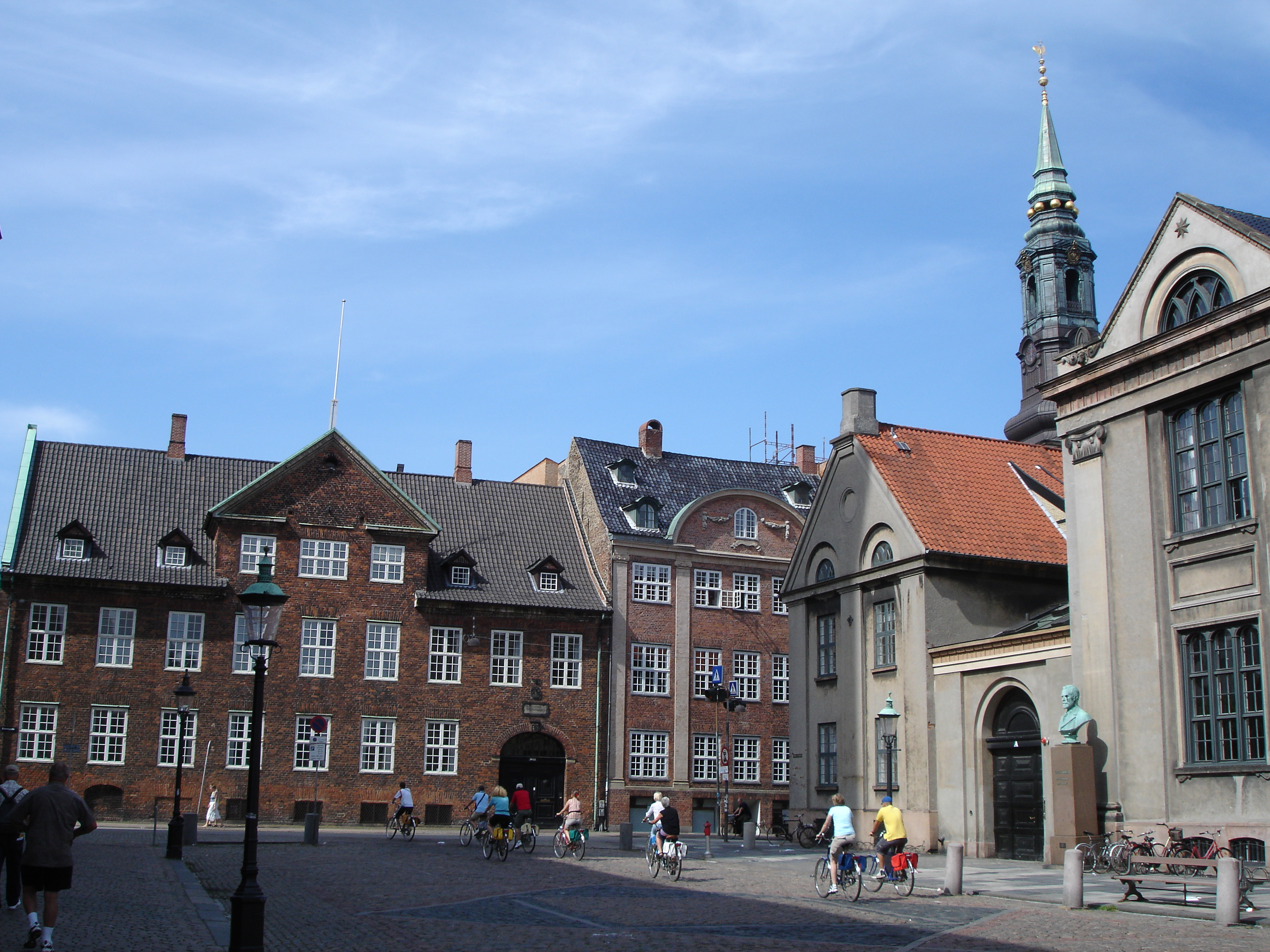
The Bishop's House

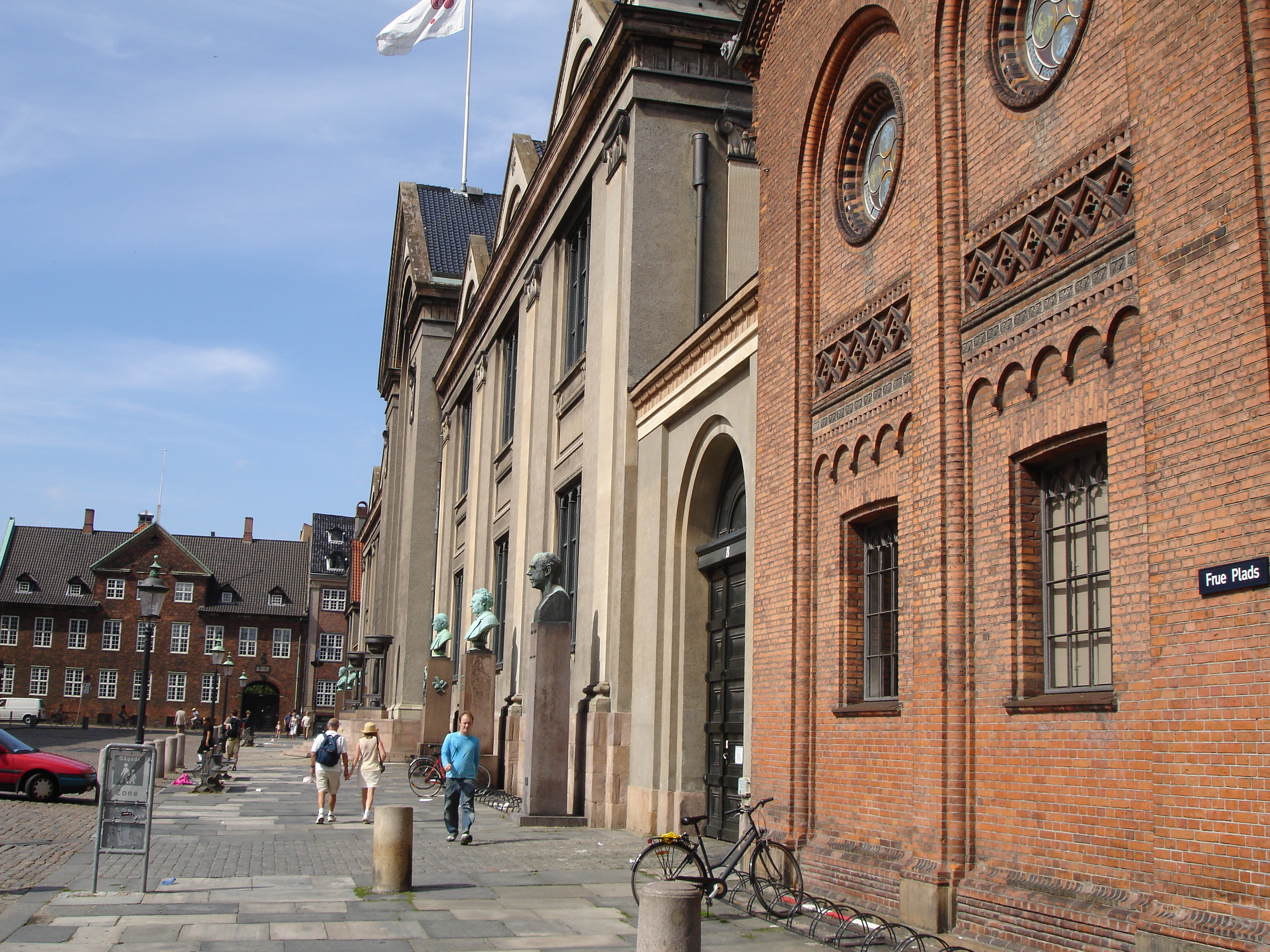
