= 1644 in Denmark =

- Decades: 1620s; 1630s; 1640s; 1650s; 1660s
- See also: Other events of 1644; List of years in Denmark

Events from the year 1644 in Denmark.

== Incumbents ==
- Monarch — Christian IV
- Steward of the Realm — Corfitz Ulfeldt

== Events ==
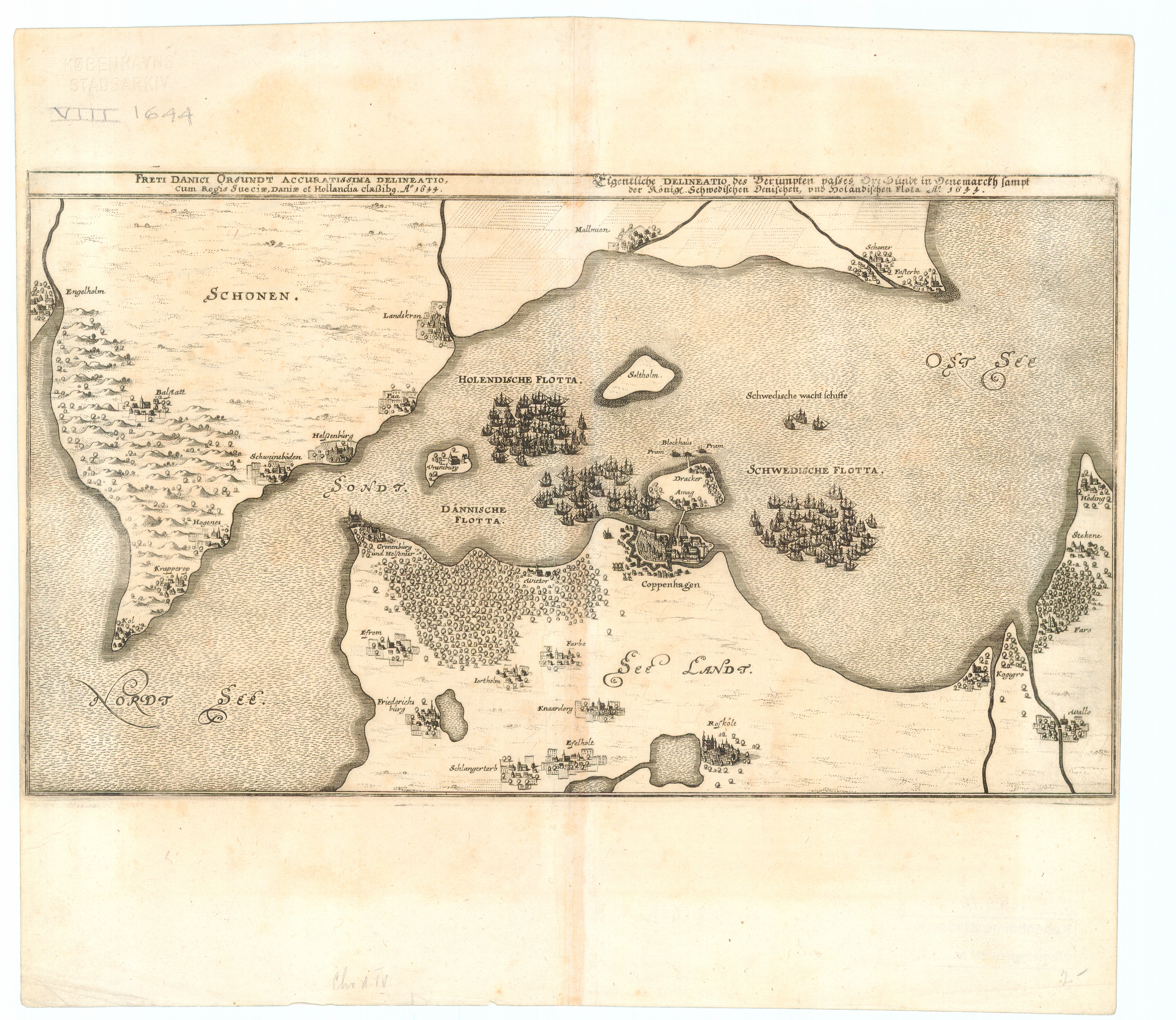
The Danish and the Swedish-Dutch fleet in Øresund, 1744.

=== Undated ===
- the Domus Anatomica anatomical theatre is completed.
- the Torstenson War breaks out between Denmark–Norway and Sweden. It was resolved by the Second Treaty of Brömsebro in 1645.

=== Torstenson War ===
- 9 January – the Battle of Kolding begins the Torstenson War.
- 16 May – the Action of 16 May 1644.
- 1 July – the Battle of Colberger Heide.
- October – The Dano-Carical Conflict begins.
- 13 October – the Battle of Frehmarn.
- 22 December – the Battle of Bysjön.

== Births ==
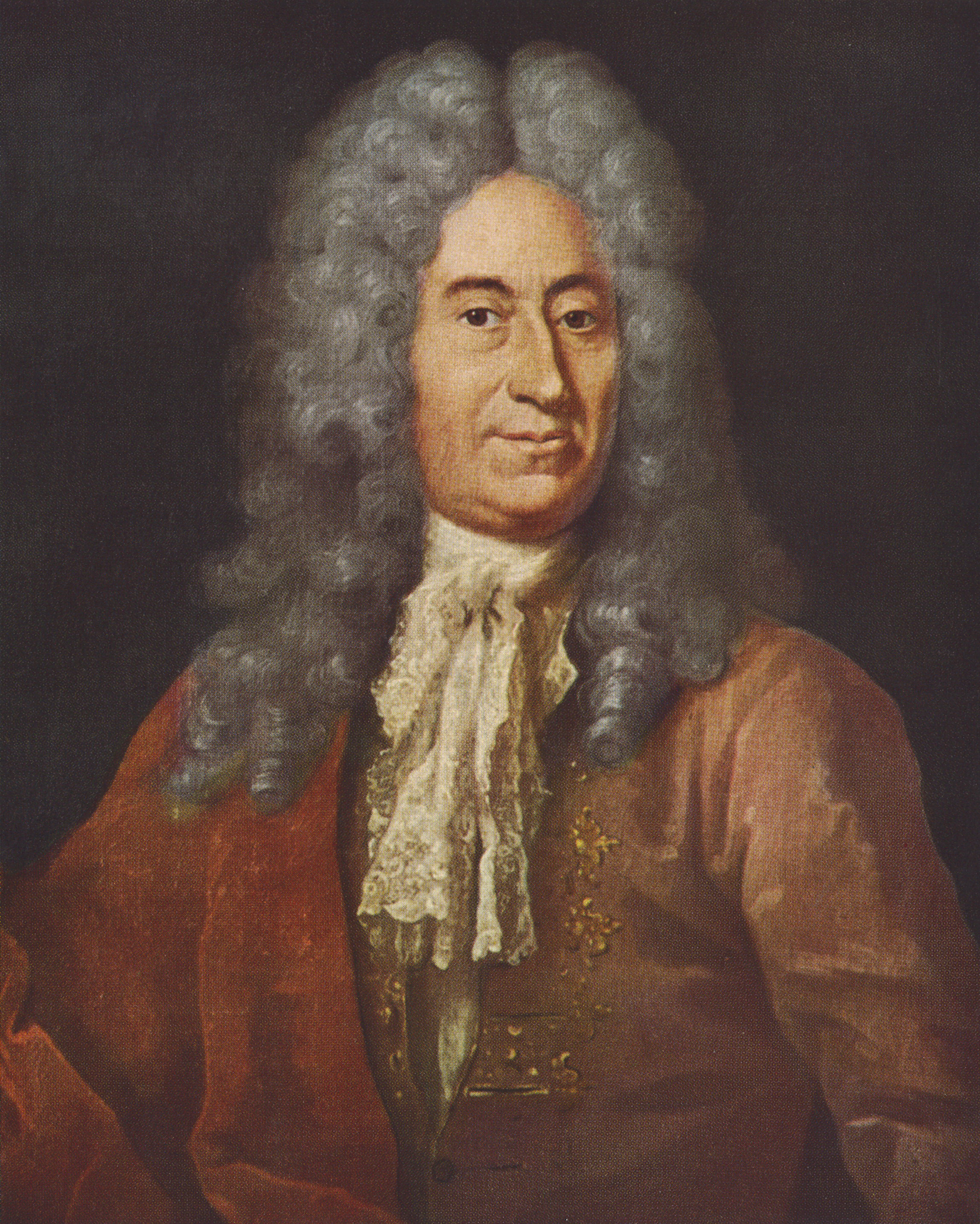
Ole Rømer.

- 18 March – Oliger Paulli, merchant and publisher (died 1714)
- 26 March – Berte Skeel, noblewoman (died 1720)
- 21 April – Conrad von Reventlow, Grand Chancellor of Denmark (died 1708)
- 6 July – Caspar Schøller, president of the Supreme Court (died 1719)
- 25 September – Ole Rømer, astronomer (died 1710)

== Deaths ==
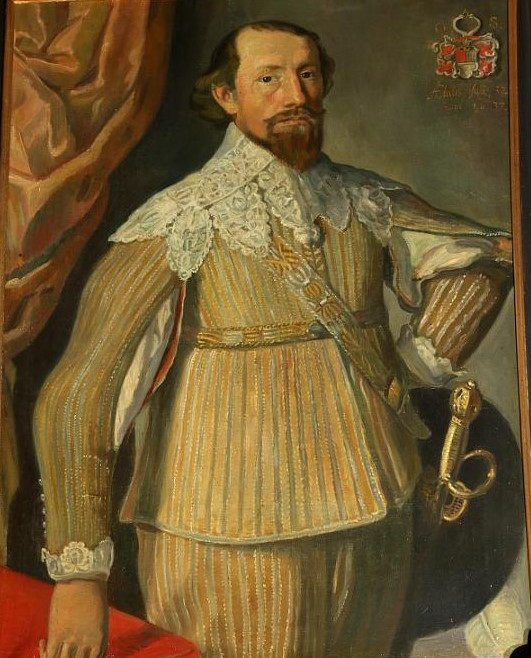
Otto Skeel.

- 20 February – Jens Bang, merchant (born c. 1575)
- 17 July – Jørgen Vind, Admiral of the Eealm (born 1593)
- 13 October – Pros Mund, admiral (born c. 1589)
- 26 May – Otto Skeel, naval officer (born 1605)
- 18 December – Leonhard Blasius, architect (born in the Netherlands)

=== Date unknown ===
- October – Corfits Ulfeldt, naval officer (born c. 1600)

== Gallery ==
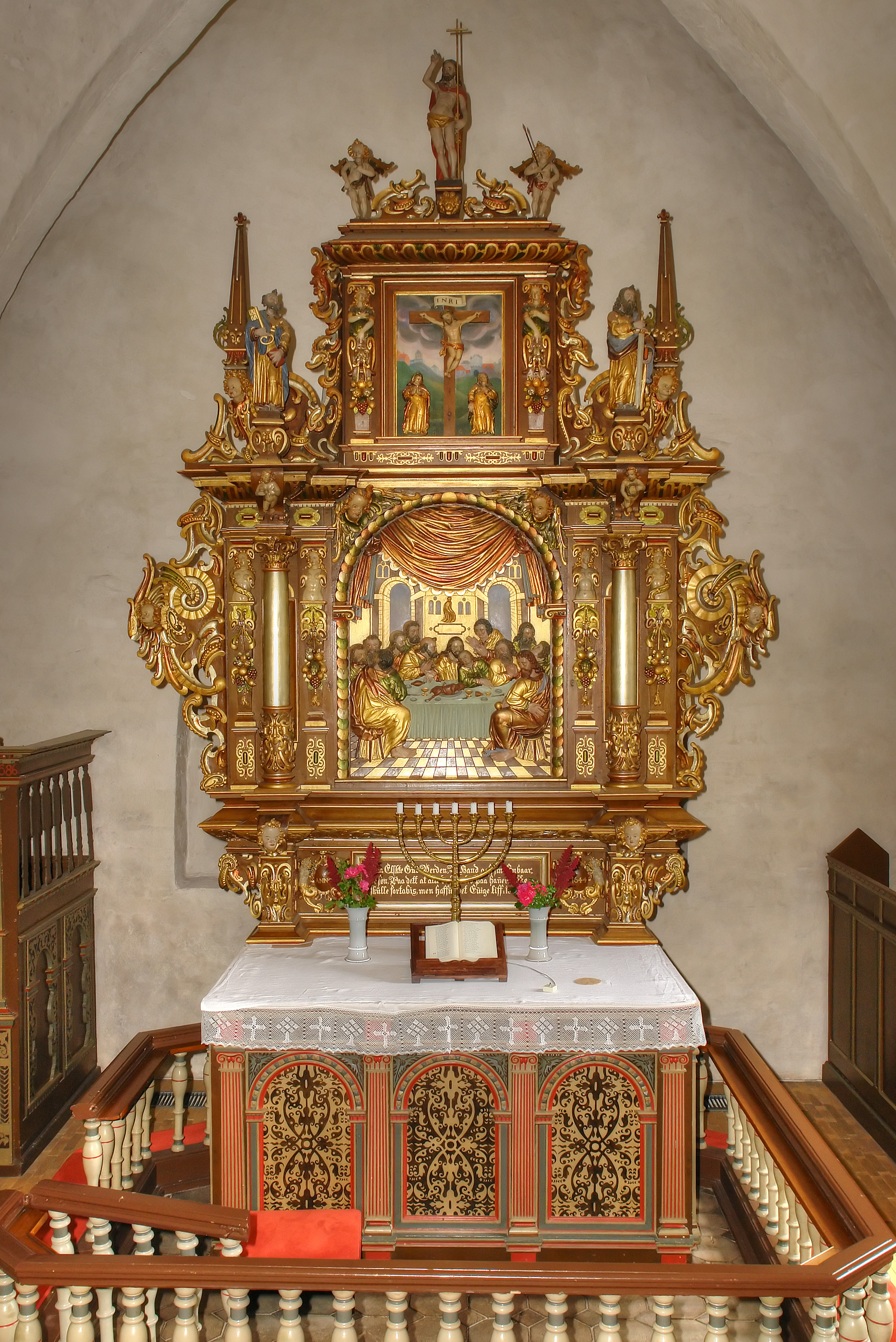
1644 altarpiece in Undløse Church.

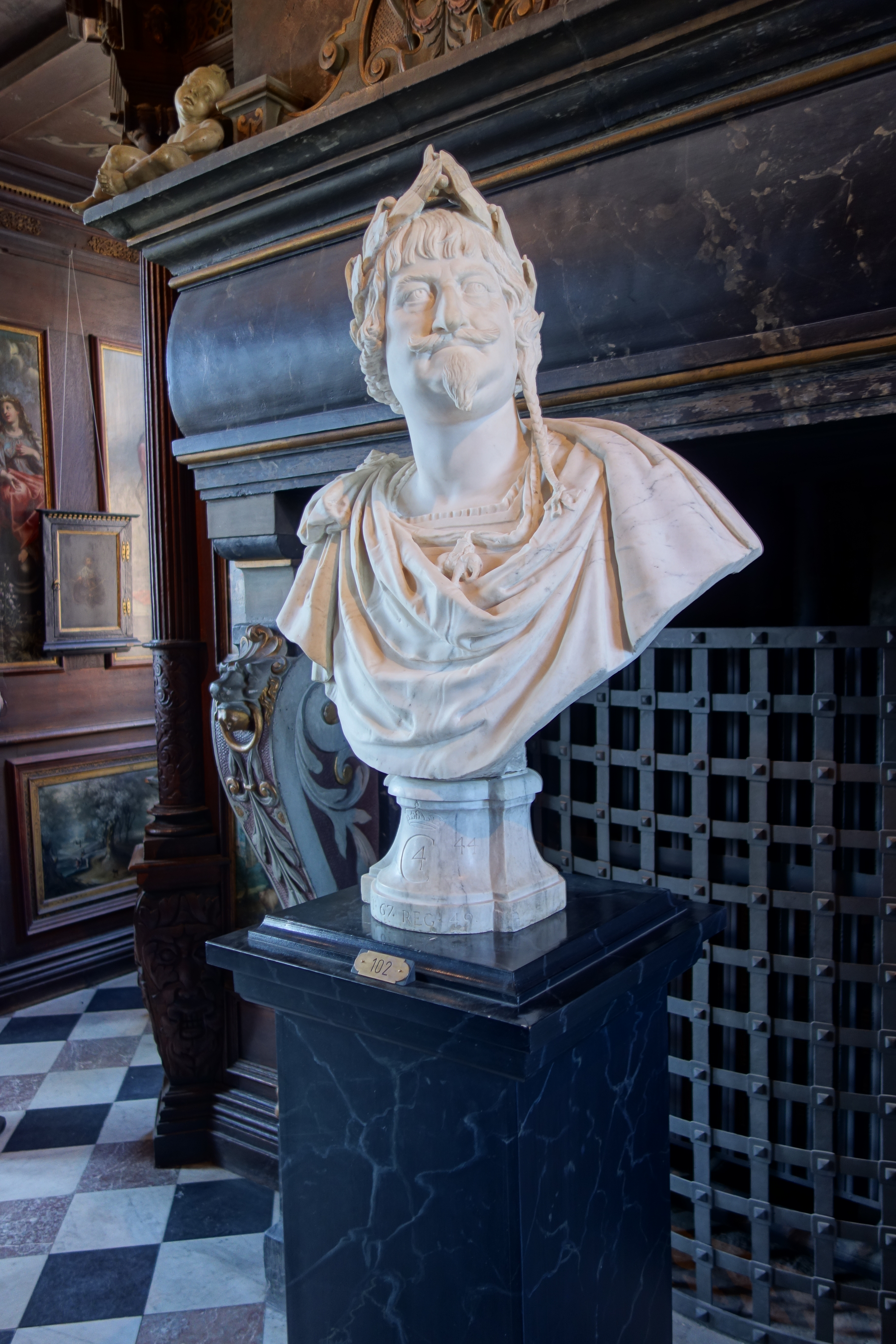
1644 bust of Christian IV in Rosenborg Castle
