= 1645 in Denmark =

- Decades: 1620s; 1630s; 1640s; 1650s; 1660s
- See also: Other events of 1645; List of years in Denmark

Events from the year 1645 in Denmark.

== Incumbents ==
- Monarch — Christian IV
- Steward of the Realm — Corfitz Ulfeldt

== Events ==
- February – The Dano-Carical Conflict begins.
- 3 March — Simon Paulli gives his first public lecture in the new Domus Anatomica in Copenhagen.
- 25 May – HDMS Stora Sofia sinks near Buskär outside the harbour of Gothenburg.
- 13 August — The Second Treaty of Brömsebro is signed, putting an end to the Torstenson War. The island Øsel is ceded to Sweden.

=== Undated ===
- Stephanius publishes Saxonis Grammatici Historiæ Danicæ Libri XVI, a Latin edition of Saxo Grammaticus's Gesta Danorum.

== Culture ==
=== Art ===
- Abraham Wuchters creates a full-length portrait of Ulrik Christian Gyldenløve.
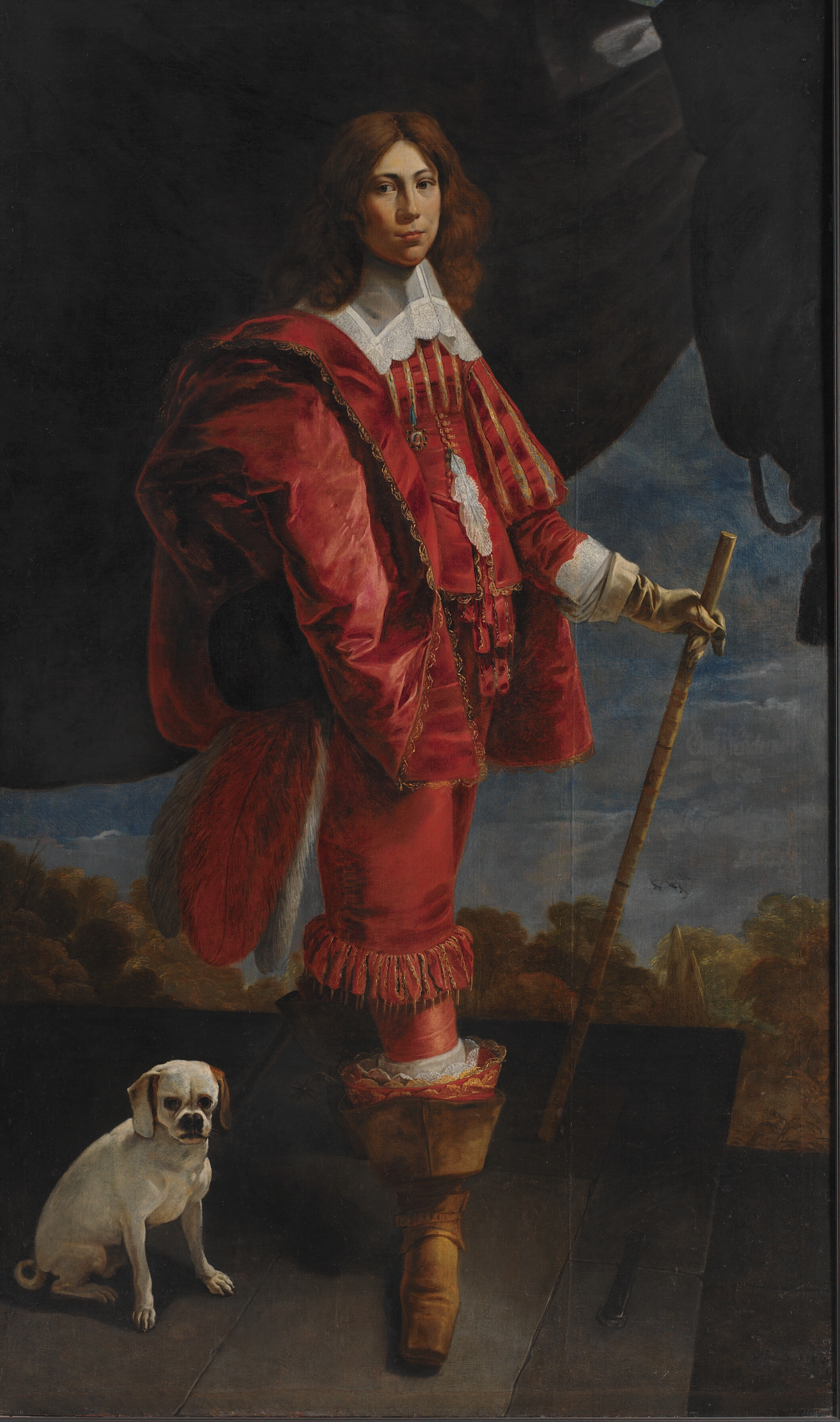
Abraham Wuchters' portrait of Ulrik Christian Gyldenløve.

== Deaths ==
- January 31 — Hans Ulrik Gyldenløve, diplomat, illegitimate son of Christian IV
