= 1648 in Denmark =

- Decades: 1620s; 1630s; 1640s; 1650s; 1660s
- See also: Other events of 1648; List of years in Denmark

Events from the year 1648 in Denmark.

== Incumbents ==
- Monarch — Christian IV (until 28 February), Frederick III
- Steward of the Realm — Corfitz Ulfeldt

== Events ==
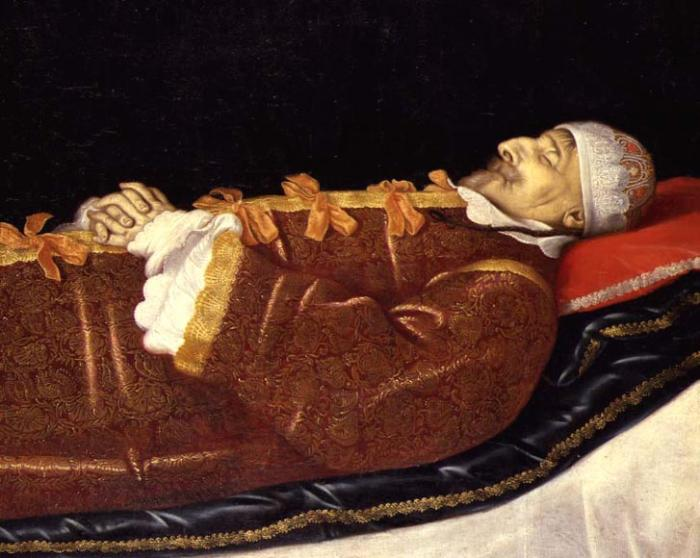
King Christian IV painted on his deathbed

Frederick III's håndfæstning.

- 28 February – King Christian IV dies in his bedchamber at Rosenborg Castle where he has been moved from Frederiksborg Castle upon his own order.
- 6 July – Frederick III signs his håndfæstning, which is the most restrictive of its kind to date.
- 23 November – Coronation of Frederick III.
- 24 November – Coronation of Queen Sophie Amalie. By that time, the triumphal arch has already been dismantled, giving rise to various speculations and rumors, particularly relating to Corfitz Ulfeldt and his party.

=== Undated ===
- Ove Gjedde resigns as Admiral (Rigsadmiral) and settles as a feudal magnate (lensmand) at Helsingborg Castle.
- Nicholas Mercator is employed by University of Copenhagen.

== Publications ==
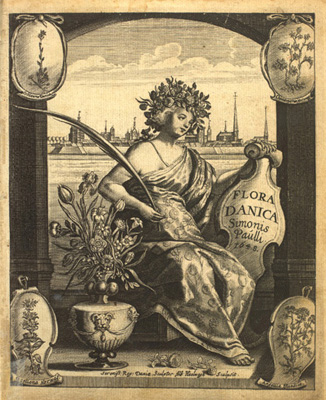
From Simon Paulli's Flora Danica

- Physician and botanist Simon Paulli publishes the first Flora Danica, not to be mistaken with the later, more famous work of the same name from the 18th century. Published in Latin but translated into Danish by a student, it strongly discourages the growing use of tobacco and tea.

== Births ==
- 5 September – Tage Thott, county governor, Supreme Court justice and landowner (died 1707)

=== Full date missing ===
- Poul Christian Schindler, composer (died 1740)

== Deaths ==
- 28 February – Christian IV, King of Denmark (born 1577)
- 27 April – Vibeke Kruse, royal mistress
- 30 September – Steen Beck, statesman and landholder (born 1603)
