= 1646 in Denmark =

- Decades: 1620s; 1630s; 1640s; 1650s; 1660s
- See also: Other events of 1646; List of years in Denmark

Events from the year 1646 in Denmark.

== Incumbents ==
- Monarch – Christian IV

== Events ==
- 30 August – Køge Pharmacy is founded.

=== Undated ===
- Møntergården is constructed by Falk Gøye in Odense.
- August Philipp, Duke of Schleswig-Holstein-Sonderburg-Beck becomes Duke of Schleswig-Holstein-Sonderburg-Beck.

== Births ==
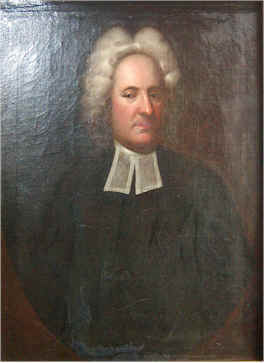
Henrik Bornemanm.

- 3 January – Henrik Bornemannm, clergyman and theologian (died 1710)
- 16 April – Christian V of Denmark (died 1699)

=== Full date missing ===
- Elsje Christiaens, murderer (died 1684)
- Matthias Knutzen, author (died after 1674)

== Deaths ==
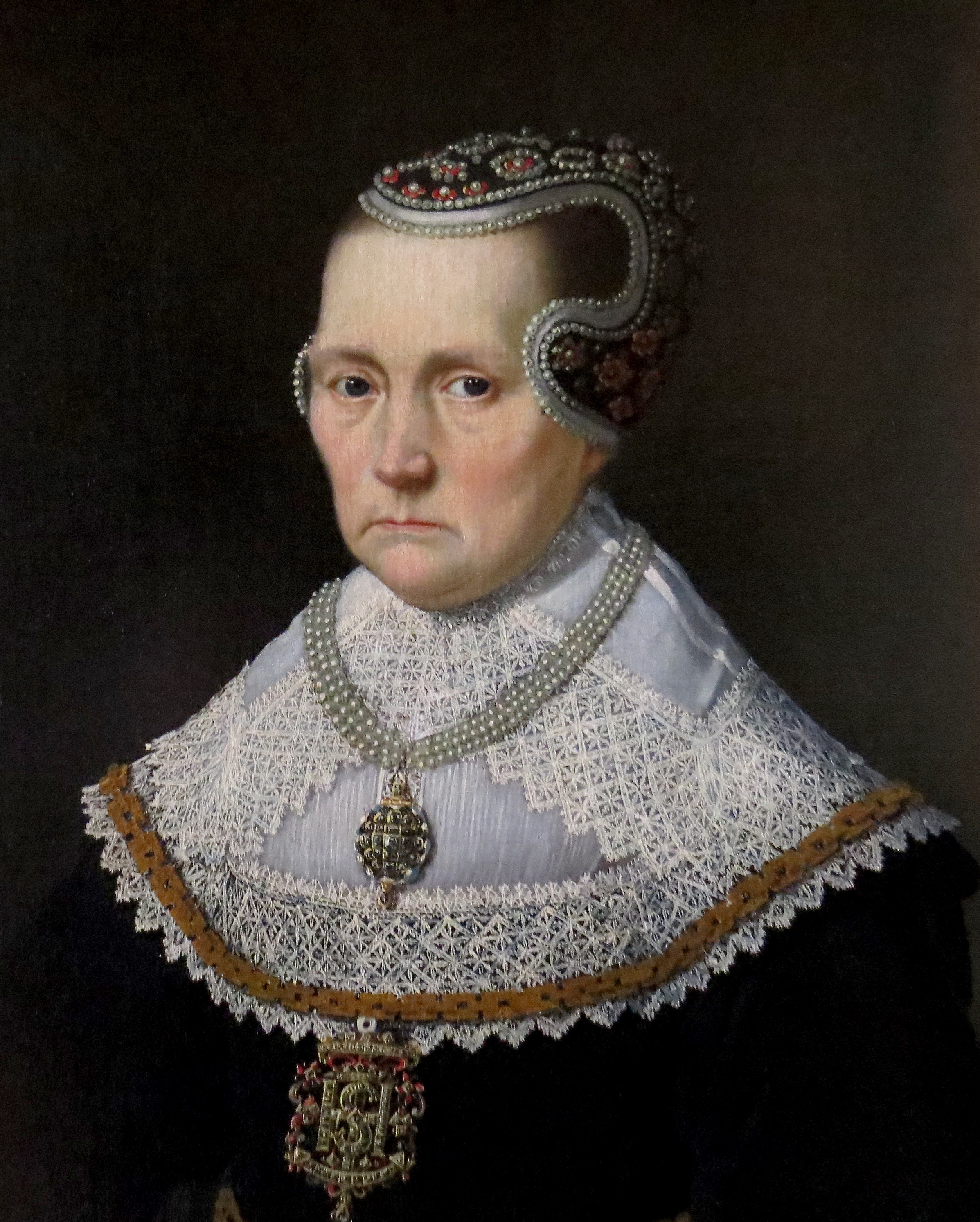
Sophie Axelsdatter Brahe,

- 25 May – Just Høg, statesman and landowner (born 1584)
- 21 December – Sophie Axelsdatter Brahe, noblewoman and landowner (1578)
- 9 December – Morten Steenwinkel, architect and painter (born 1596)

=== Full date missing ===
- Morten Steenwinkel, architect (born 1595)

== Publications ==
- Thomas Bartholin: De Angina Puerorum Campaniae Siciliaeque Epidemica Exercitationes. Paris
- Christen Sørensen Longomontanus: Caput tertium Libri primi de absoluta Mensura Rotundi plani, etc
