= Royal Danish Academy of Surgery =

Coordinates: 55.6859°N 12.5918°E

The Royal Danish Academy of Surgery (Danish: Det Kongelige Kirurgiske Akademi), or Academia Chirurgorum Regia, was an educational institution which existed from 1785 until 1842 in Copenhagen, Denmark. Its former building at Bredgade now houses Medical Museion, University of Copenhagen's museum of medicine.

== History ==
The Academy of Surgery was founded on 22 June 1785 as a replacement for the Theatrum Anatomico-chirurgicum from 1736. Queen Dowager Juliane Marie donated a lot in Bredgade, near Frederiks Hospital, and a building for the new institution was completed in 1787 to a design by Peter Meyn. The first president of the Academy was Alexander Kølpin (1731–1801).

The Academy of Surgery merged with the Faculty of Medicine at the University of Copenhagen on 1 January 1842. The building remained in use for dissections and lectures on surgery. It now houses Medical Museion, the University's museum of medicine.

== See also ==
- Domus Anatomica
