= 1642 in Denmark =

- Decades: 1620s; 1630s; 1640s; 1650s; 1660s
- See also: Other events of 1642; List of years in Denmark

Events from the year 1642 in Denmark.

== Incumbents ==
- Monarch – Christian IV
- Steward of the Realm – Corfitz Ulfeldt

== Events ==
- The Rundetaarn in Copenhagen was completed.

== Deaths ==
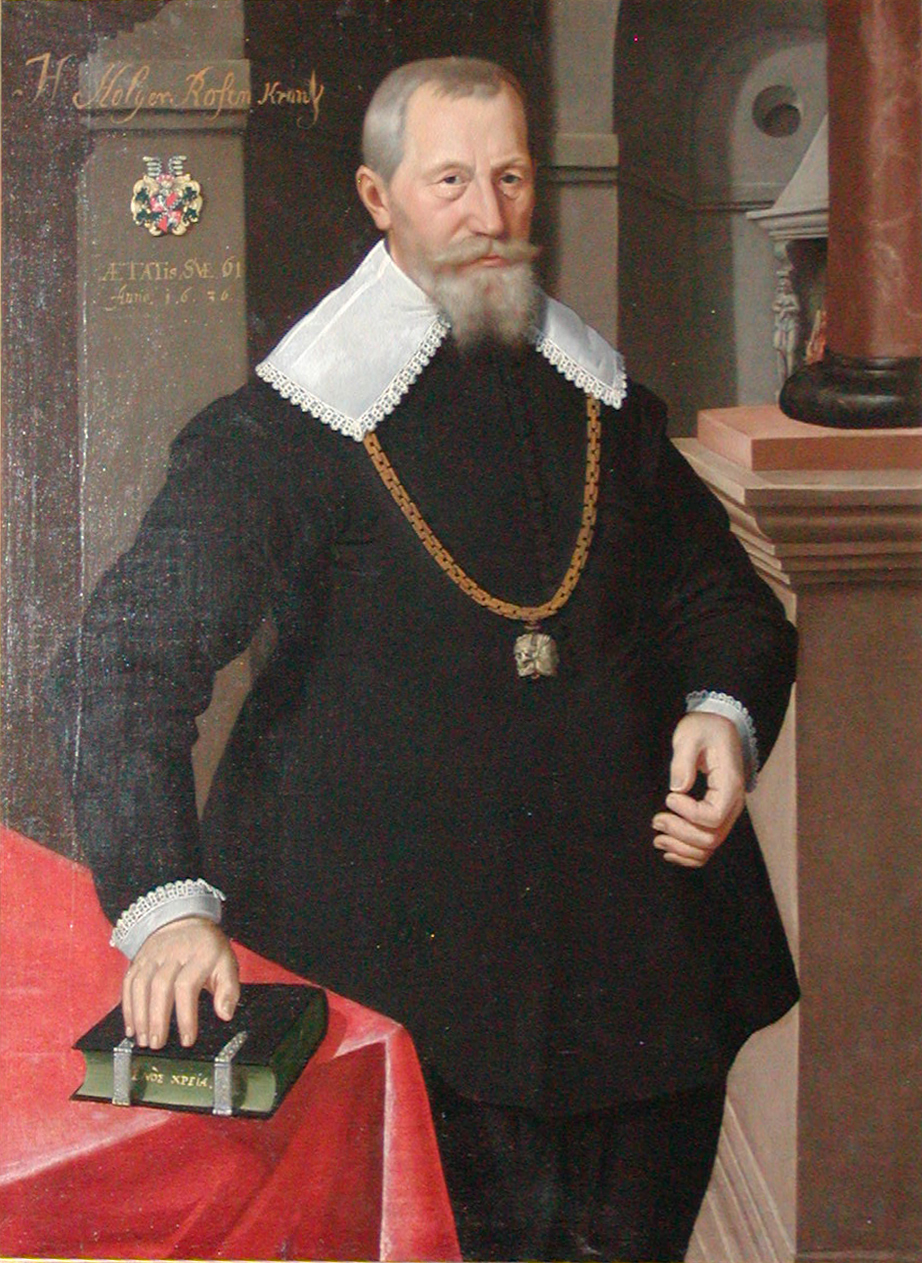
Holger Rosenkrantz.

- 19 February - Jørgen Knudsen Urne, statesman (born 1590s )
- 22 February – Palle Rosenkrantz, landowner (born 1587)
- 27 October – Holger Rosenkrantz, nobleman (born 1574)
