= 1785 in Denmark =

- Decades: 1760s; 1770s; 1780s; 1790s; 1800s
- See also: Other events of 1785; List of years in Denmark

Events from the year 1785 in Denmark.

== Incumbents ==
- Monarch – Christian VII
- Prime minister – Andreas Peter Bernstorff

== Events ==
- 22 June – The Academy of Surgery is founded in Copenhagen, replacing the Theatrum Anatomico-chirurgicum from 1736.

== Births ==
- 4 January – Friedrich Wilhelm, Duke of Schleswig-Holstein-Sonderburg-Glücksburg (died 1831)
- 16 January – Frederikke Løvenskiold, composer (died 1876)
- 25 August – Adam Wilhelm Moltke, landowner and politician (died 1864)
- 10 October – Gerhard Christoph von Krogh, military fficer (died 1860)

== Deaths ==
- 28 May – Johan Peter Suhr, businessman (born 1712)
- 10 September – Otto Thott, count, minister of state and bibliophile (born 1703)
- 29 December – Johan Herman Wessel, poet (born 1742)
