= Ole Borch =

Danish scientist (1626–1690)

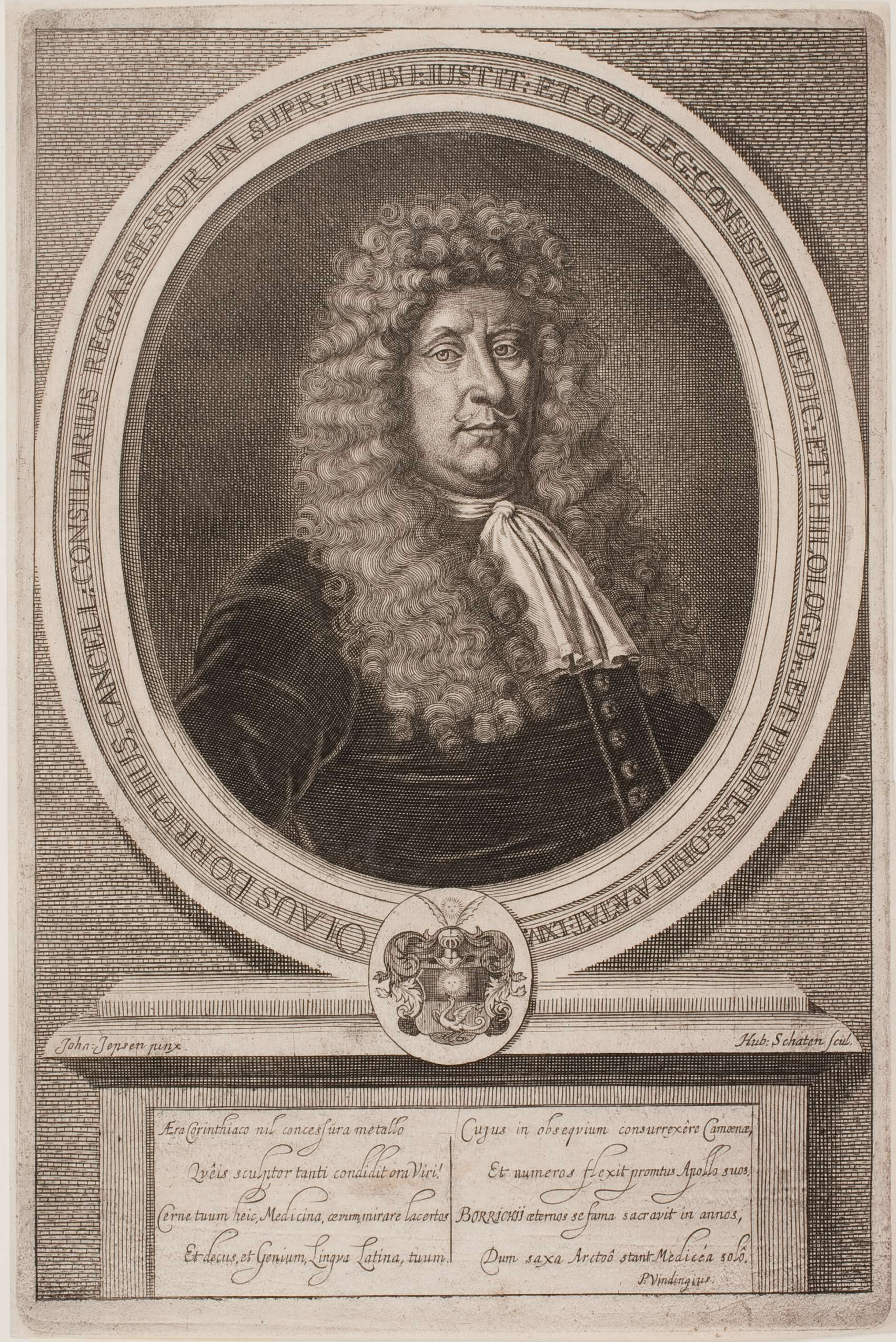
- Ole Borch
- Born: April 7, 1626; Ribe, Denmark
- Died: October 13, 1690 (aged 64); Copenhagen, Denmark
- Education: University of Copenhagen
- Occupation: Danish scientist

Ole Borch (7 April 1626 – 13 October 1690) (Latinized to Olaus Borrichius or Olaus Borrichus) was a Danish scientist, physician, grammarian, and poet. He was royal physician to both Kings Frederick III of Denmark and Christian V of Denmark. He was the founder of Borchs Kollegium and is noted for being the influential instructor of scientist Nicolas Steno.

== Biography ==
Borch was born at Nørre Bork in the Diocese of Ribe, Denmark. He was the son of Oluf Clausen and Margrethe Lauridsdatter. His father was a parish priest, He studied medicine at the University of Copenhagen. He became a lector at Vor Frue Skole in 1650. He distinguished himself in the plague of 1654, when a third of Copenhagen's population died. In 1655 he was patronized by Joachim Gersdorff, the royal seneschal. In 1655, Borch was summoned to raise the sons of Gersdorff, a position he held for five years. Between 1660 and 1665, he visited Germany, the Netherlands, France, England, and Italy with the sons of Gersdorff. He visited his former pupil Nicolas Steno, Johann Glauber, Giuseppe Francesco Borri and Comenius. In England he met Robert Boyle and in France he visited Melchisédech Thévenot. His well recorded journals of his travels are an important document of the European scientific climate in the 17th century.

Returning to Copenhagen in 1665, he assumed the position that he was to hold for nearly thirty years. He became a professor of philology at the University of Copenhagen and in 1666 of chemistry and botany.

Borch is one of the fathers of experimental science in Denmark. He was the founder of Borchs Kollegium in central Copenhagen. It was Borch who first introduced Nicholas Steno to fossils such as glossopetrae which Borch used, as was common for the time, in medicines. He extracted oxygen out of saltpeter in 1678.

== Legacy ==
Borch is commemorated in the scientific name of a species of South American snake, Siagonodon borrichianus. His name is also the genus for several salt-tolerant plants, Borrichia.

== Works ==
- De Ortu et Progressu Chemiae Dissertatio, 1668;
- Hermetis, Aegypiorum et Chemicorum sapientia, 1674;
- Conspectus Scriptorum Chemicorum Celebriorum, 1696 (posthumously).
