= Collegium (disambiguation) =

A collegium (plural collegia) may refer to:

- collegium (ancient Rome), a term applied to any association with a legal personality in ancient Rome
  - College of Pontiffs, the highest-ranking collection of priests of the state religion
- a Latinized form of the Ancient Greek term hetaireia
- Collegium Musicum, any of the university-oriented music societies of Reformation-era Germany and Switzerland
- Collegium (ministry), an executive body of the central government in Russia
- Collegium (school), a French form of schooling that is both a secondary school and a college
- An outdated spelling of kollegium in Scandinavia
  - Hassagers Kollegium, a dormitory at Frederiksberg Bredegade, Frederiksberg, Denmark
  - Borchs Kollegium, a dormitory on Store Kannikestræde, Copenhagen, Denmark
- An alternative term for some meanings of "College" (disambiguation)
