= 1647 in Denmark =

- Decades: 1620s; 1630s; 1640s; 1650s; 1660s
- See also: Other events of 1647; List of years in Denmark

Events from the year 1647 in Denmark.

== Incumbents ==
- Monarch – Christian IV

== Events ==
- 2 June – Crown-Prince Christian dies, leading to a succession crisis in Denmark-Norway.

=== Undated ===
- Prince Frederick organized a trading mission to Barbados.

== Culture ==
=== Art ===
- The group portrait painting of Ole Worm and his family is completed.
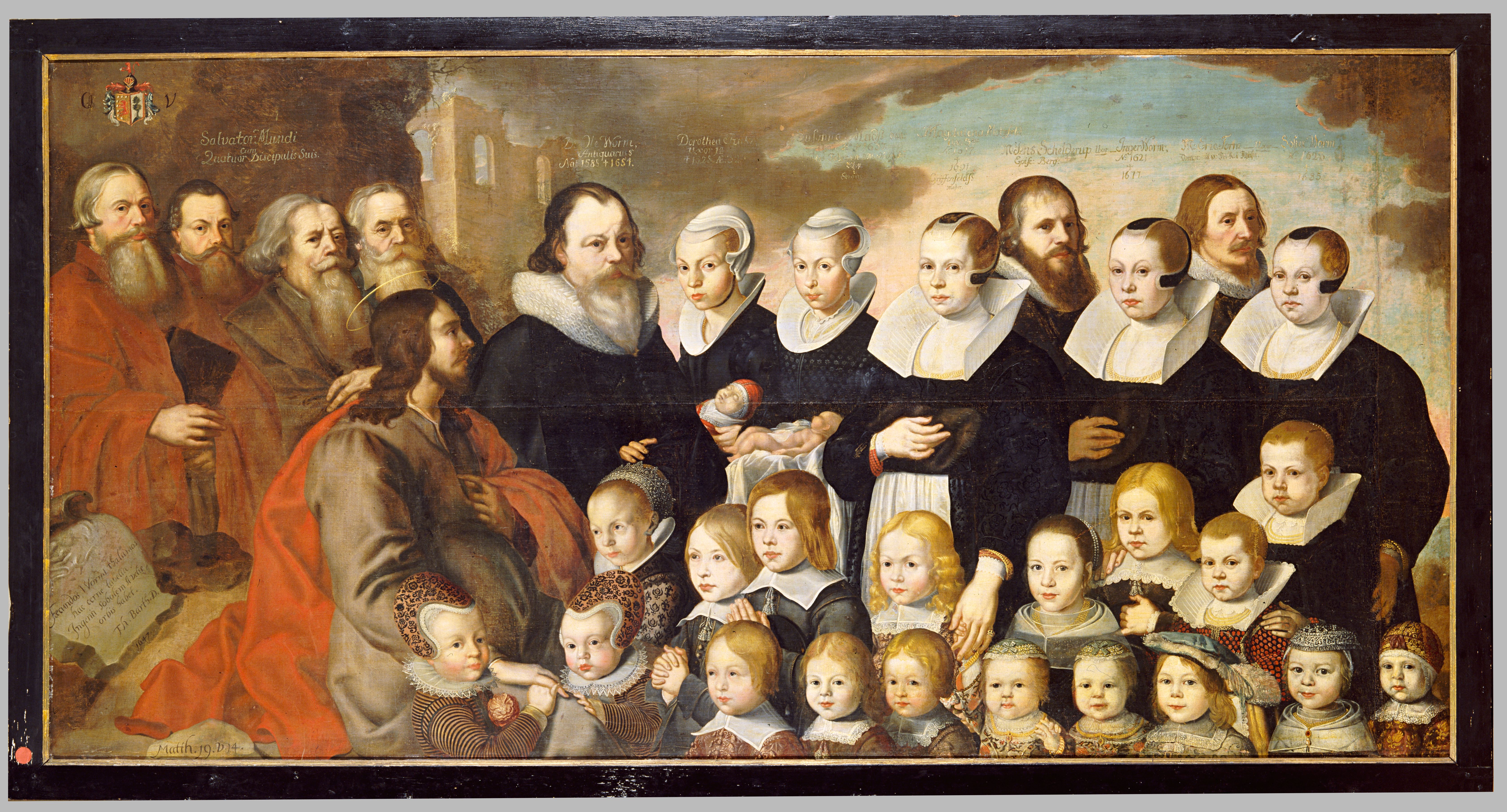
Portrait of Ole Worm and his family.

== Births ==
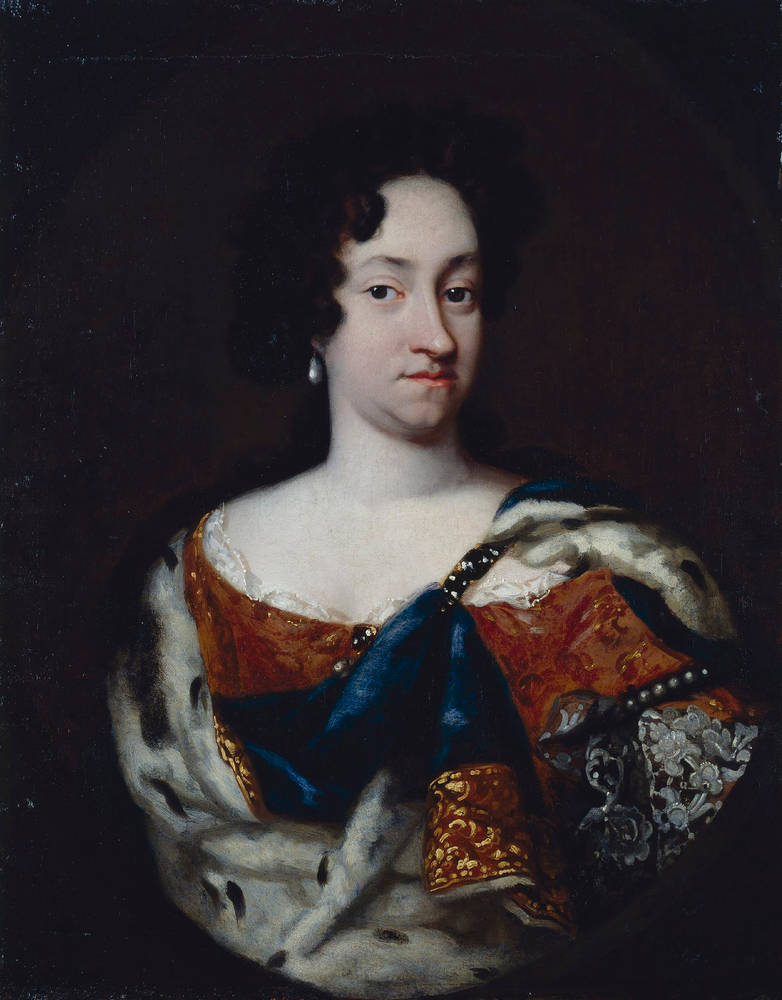
Princess Anna Sophie of Denmark.

- 1 September – Princess Anna Sophie of Denmark, princess (died 1717)

== Deaths ==
- 2 June – Christian, Prince-Elect of Denmark, prince (born 1603)
