= Peder Malling =

Danish architect

Oeder Malling
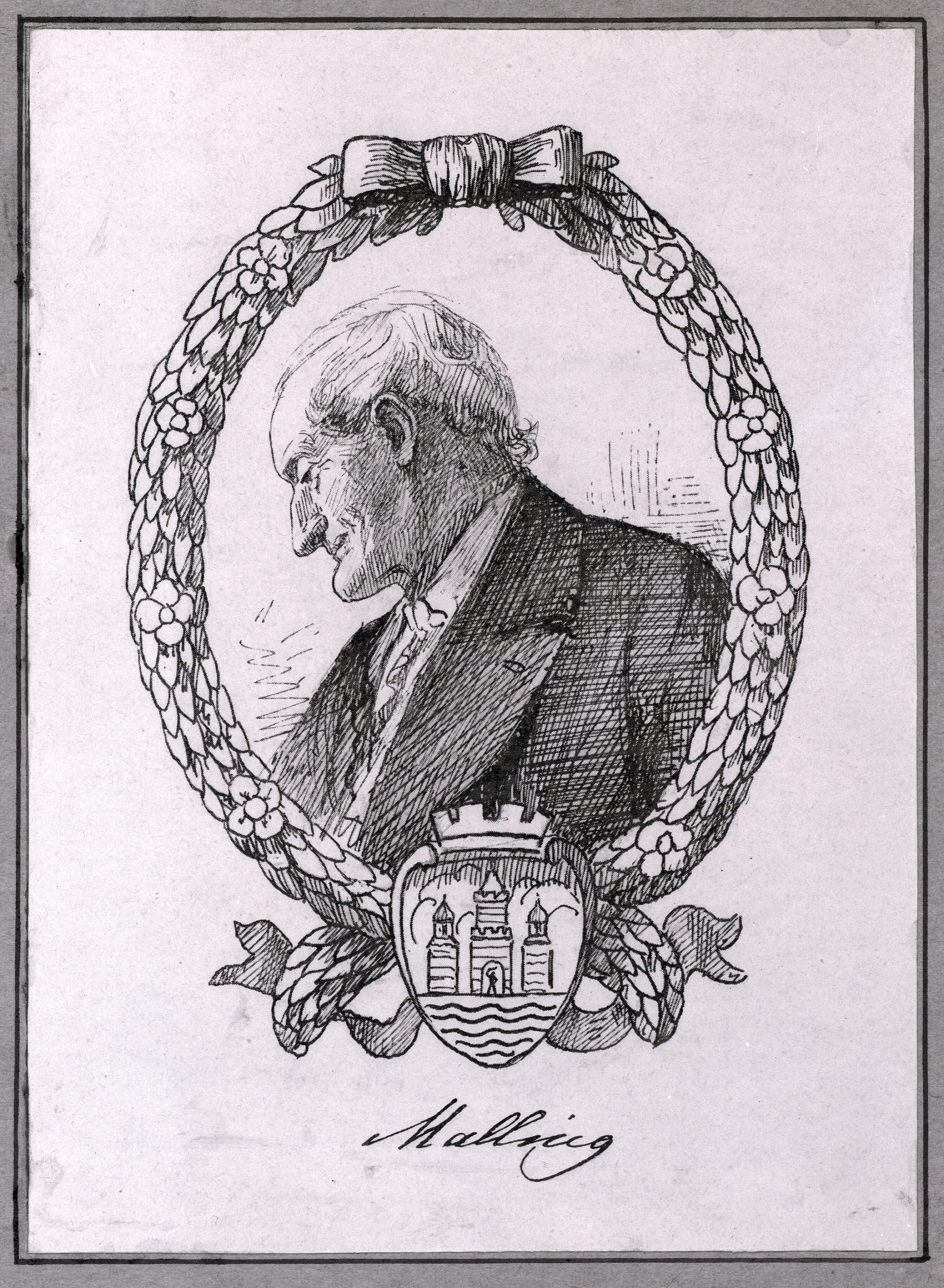
- Born: 22 December 1781; Copenhagen, Denmark
- Died: 3 May 1865 (aged 83); Copenhagen, Denmark
- Occupation: Architect
- Buildings: Sorø Academy (1827), University of Copenhagen (1836)

Signature
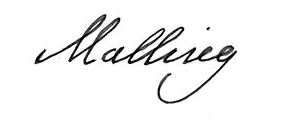

Peder Malling (22 December 1781 – 3 May 1865) was a Danish architect. He served as city architect in Copenhagen from 1809 until his death and as chief architect for the Royal Danish Navy from 1819. None of these appointments resulted in major construction projects, partly because his terms of office fell during a period of economic crisis and partly because C. F. Hansen, his former mentor, had already been assigned the most significant tasks of the time. Malling is best known for designing the main buildings of Sorø Academy in Sorø and Copenhagen University on Frue Plads in Copenhagen.

== Early life and education ==
Malling was born on 22 December 1781 in Copenhagen, the son of Ove Malling (1747–1829) and Christiane Beck (1761–1834). His maternal grandfather was Jens Michelsen Beck. His sister Louise Sophie Malling (1784–1854) was married to the lawyer Peder Hersleb. The sister Charlotte Malling (1786–1879) was married to the landowner, agronomist and botanist Niels de Hofman-Bang. The sister Birgitte Christiane Malling (1800–1866) was married to Johannes Søbøtker Hohlenberg, a jurist who served as governor of Serampore in Danish India. Malling was admitted to the Royal Danish Academy of Fine Arts in 1798. In 1800 he won the acqademy's large silver medal and was subsequently awarded a royal stipend which enabled him to continue his training under Christian Frederik Hansen in Altona.

== Career ==
In 1804, he followed Hansen back to Copenhagen to work in his large studio. He worked as executing architect at the construction of the second Christiansborg Palace. In 1809. he succeeded Peter Meyn as city architect in Copenhagen. In 1810, he received a travel stipend which enabled him to go to Rome. In Rome he joined the circle around C. W. Eckersberg and Bertel Thorvaldsen. He served as one of Thorvaldsen's letter writers. During his stay in Rome, he also persuaded G. F. Hetsch to follow him back to Copenhagen. After his return to Copenhagen, Malling was made an associated member of the academy. In 1819, he was made a full member of the academy. In the same year, he succeeded Boye Magens as naval building master.

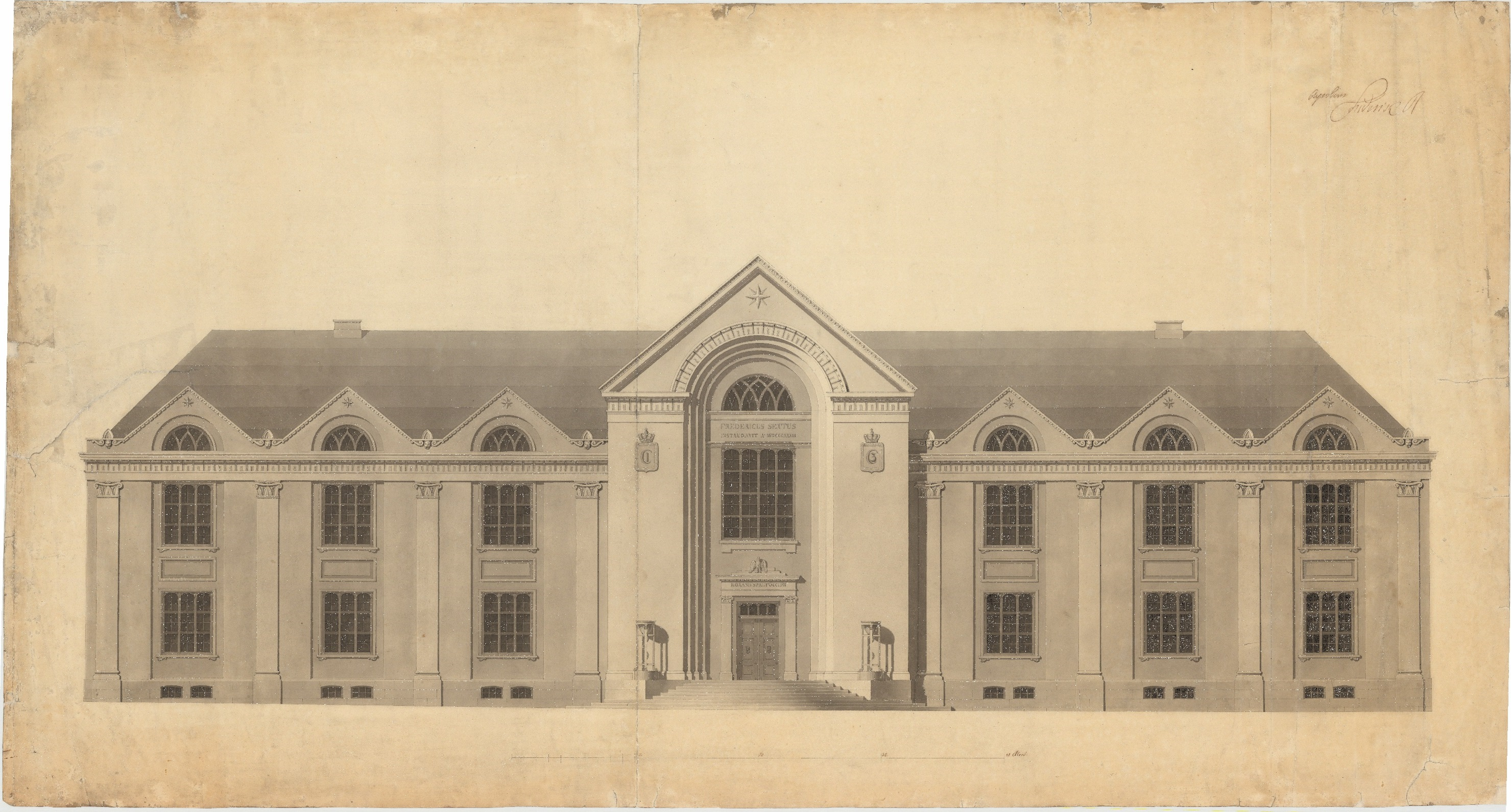
Peder Malling: Copenhagen University.

In 1816, Malling created his first proposal for a new building for Sorø Academy. It was not until 822 that he was charged with designing the building and it was not completed until 1827. In 1819, he was also charged with designing a new main building for the University of Copenhagen on Frue Plads. The project was put on hold after his first proposal had been deemed too costly in 1820. Another proposal was approved in 1826 but the building was not completed until ten year later.

The university's building committee chose not to follow Malling's suggestions for the interior of the building. Malling reacted harshly to this decision, resulting in him being fired from the project prior to its completion. This left Malling bitter and increasingly withdrawn from public life.

== Works ==
Malling is best known for designing the main buildings of Sorø Academy in Sorø and Copenhagen University in Copenhagen. With its combination of inspiration from Medieval architecture and Neoclassicism, the latter of these buildings has been described as one of the finest examples of Romantic architecture in Denmark and the first example of Gothic Revival architecture in the country. Other works by Malling include the Rector's House in Roskilde (1821), Borchs kollegium (1823–24) and the tower of Bringstrup kChurch (1814–18).

Malling was also responsible for refurbishing a number of existing buildings, including the Bishop's House in Aalborg (1819–20) and Church of the Holy Ghost in Copenhagen (1845–46). He has also designed Peder Wessel Tordenskiold's sarcofagis in Holmen Church (1817).

== Gallery ==
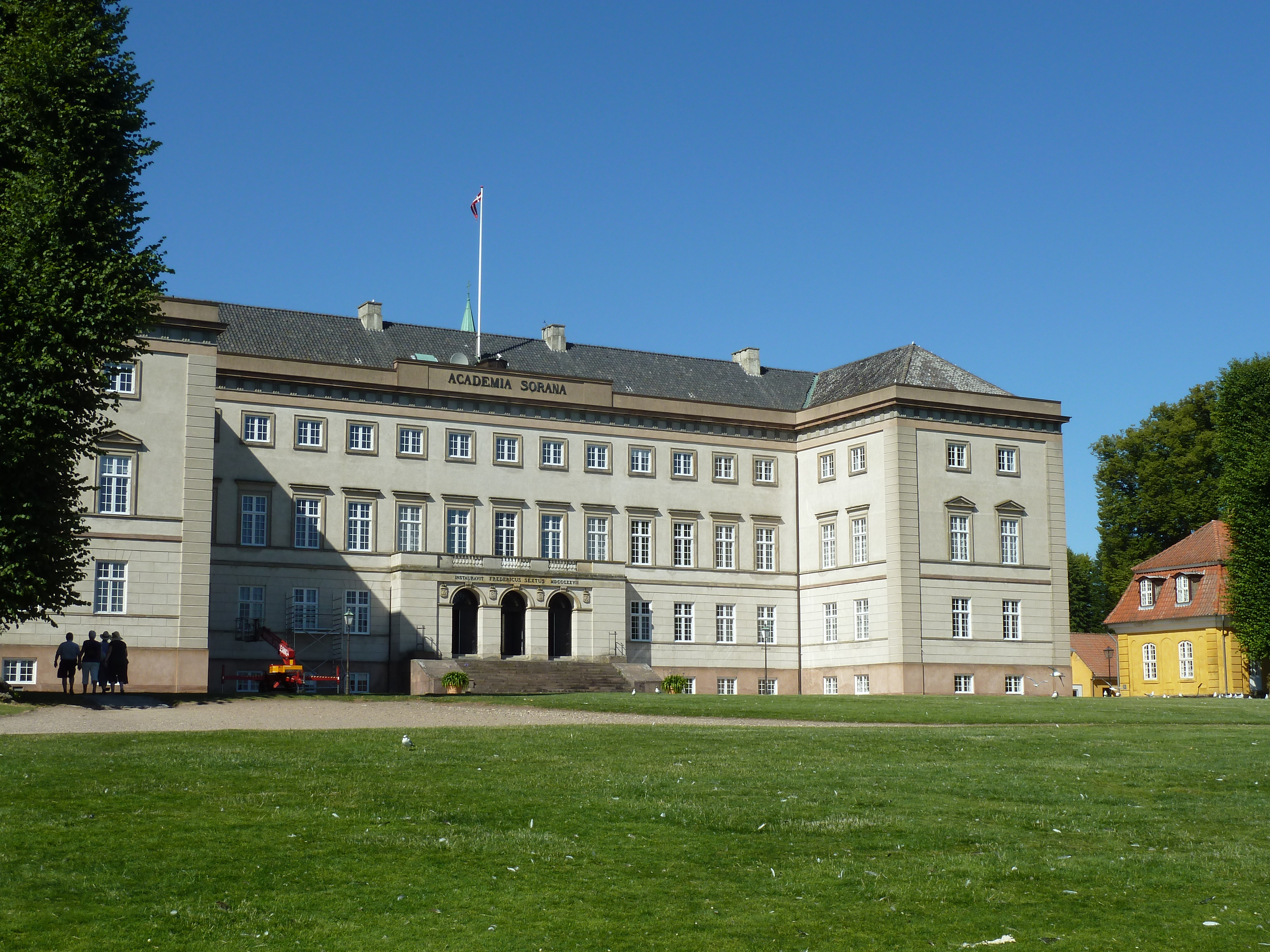
Sorø Academy.

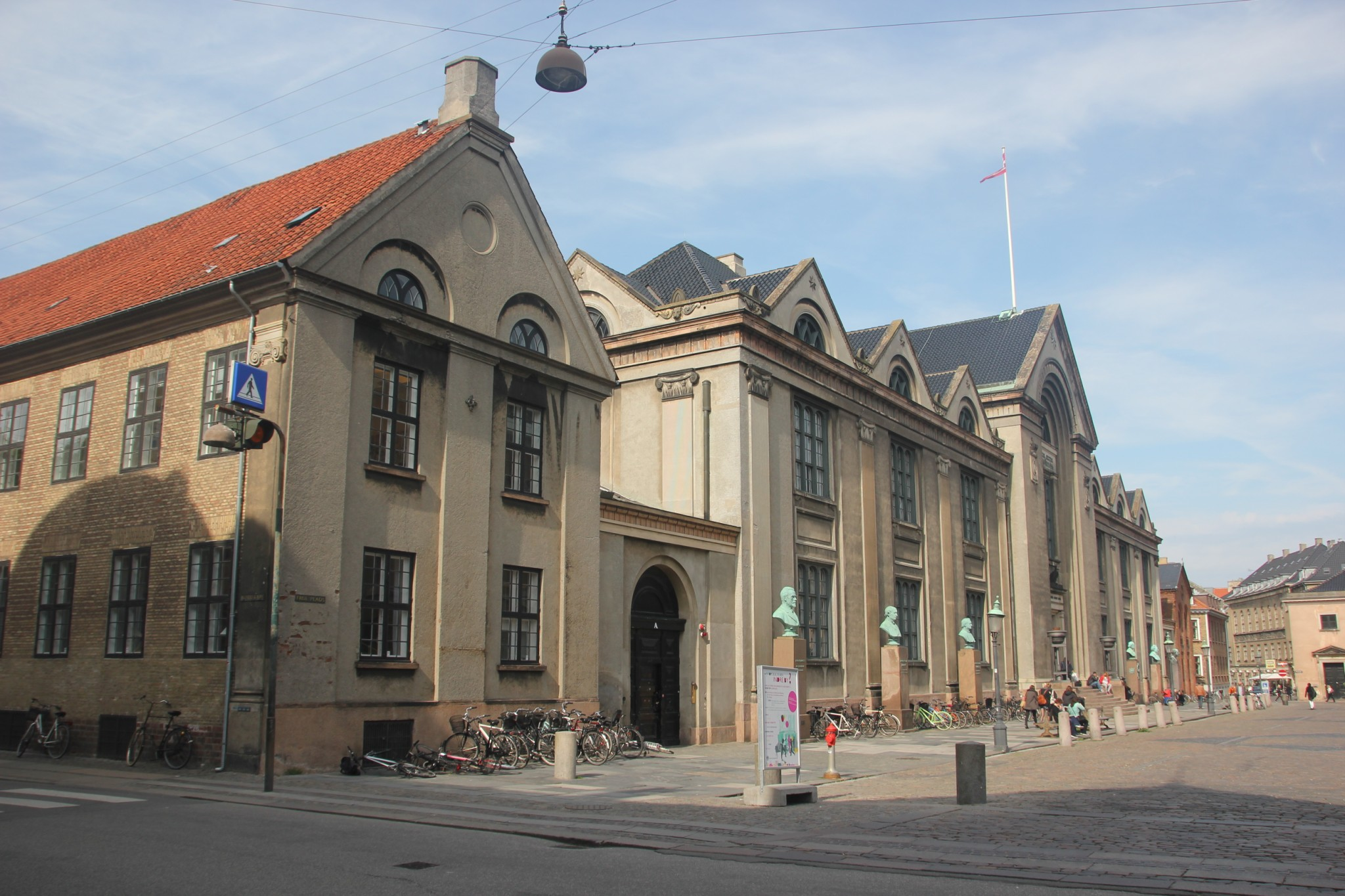
University of Copenhagen.

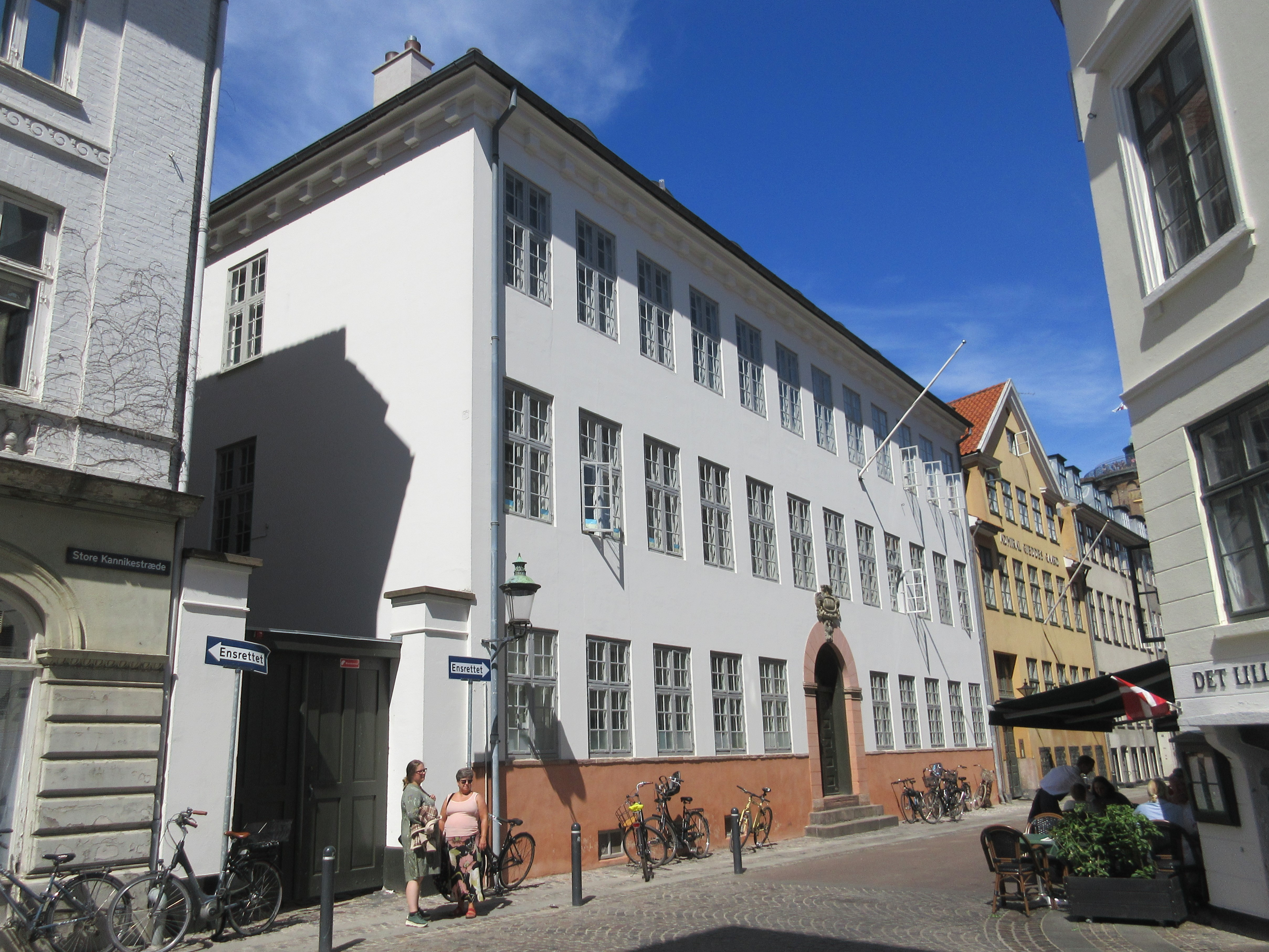
Borchs Kollegium.
