= Bernhard Keil =

Danish Baroque painter

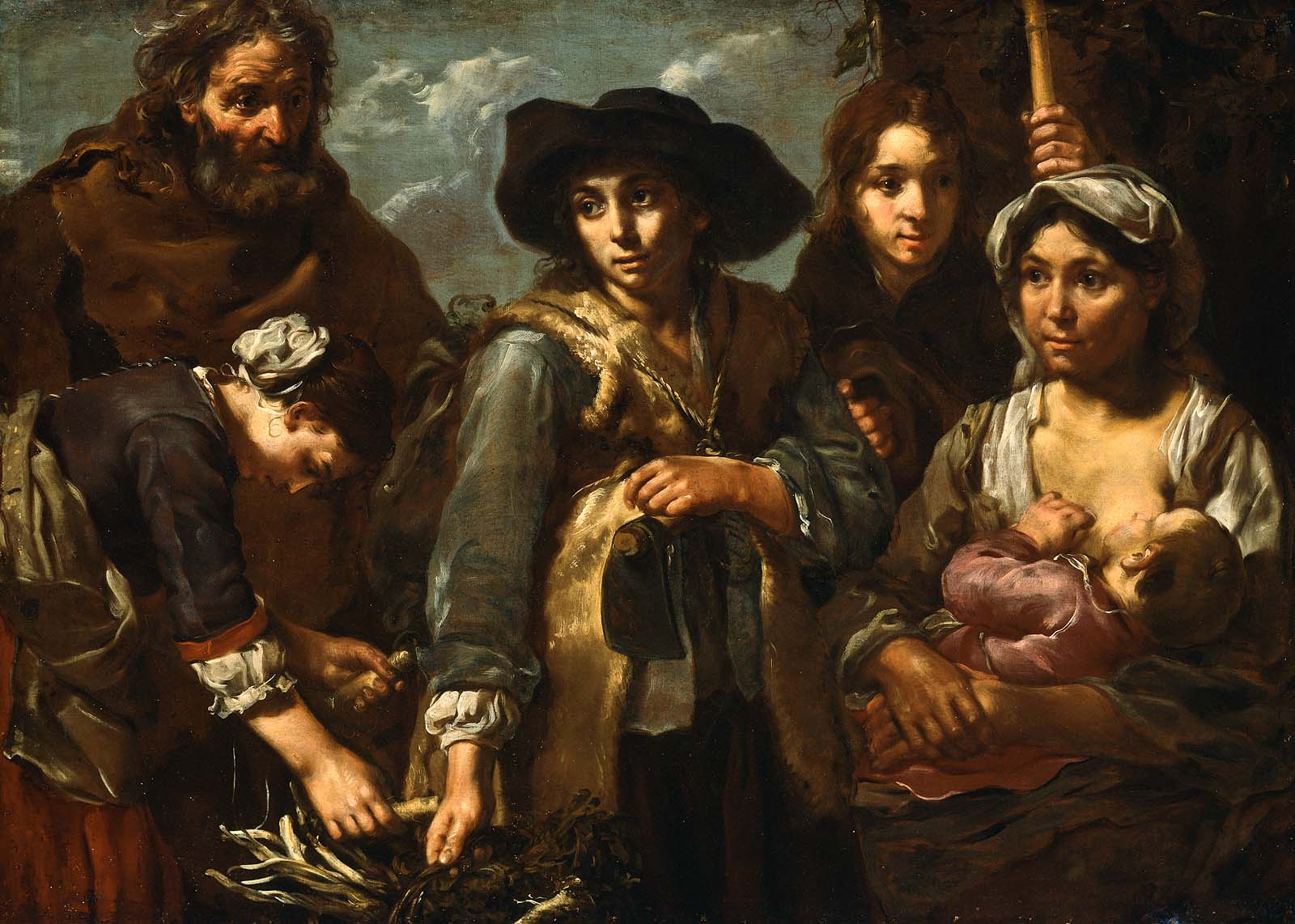
Young Boy Selling Kindling Wood

Bernhard Keil or Keyl (1624 – 3 February 1687) was a Danish Baroque painter who became a pupil of Rembrandt.

== Biography ==
Keil was born in Helsingør. According to the RKD he was a pupil of the Danish painter Morten Steenwinkel and became a pupil of Rembrandt in Amsterdam from 1642 until 1644. From1645 to 1648 he was with Hendrick Uylenburgh and he had a workshop of his own from 1649 to 1651. In 1656 he travelled to Rome, and is registered there until 1687, when he died. He also worked in Bergamo and Venice. He was influenced by Jan Lievens and in turn influenced the painters Pietro Bellotti (1627–1700), Antonio Cifrondi, and Giacomo Francesco Cipper.
