= Jørgen Gudmundsen-Holmgreen =

Danish sculptor (1895–1966)

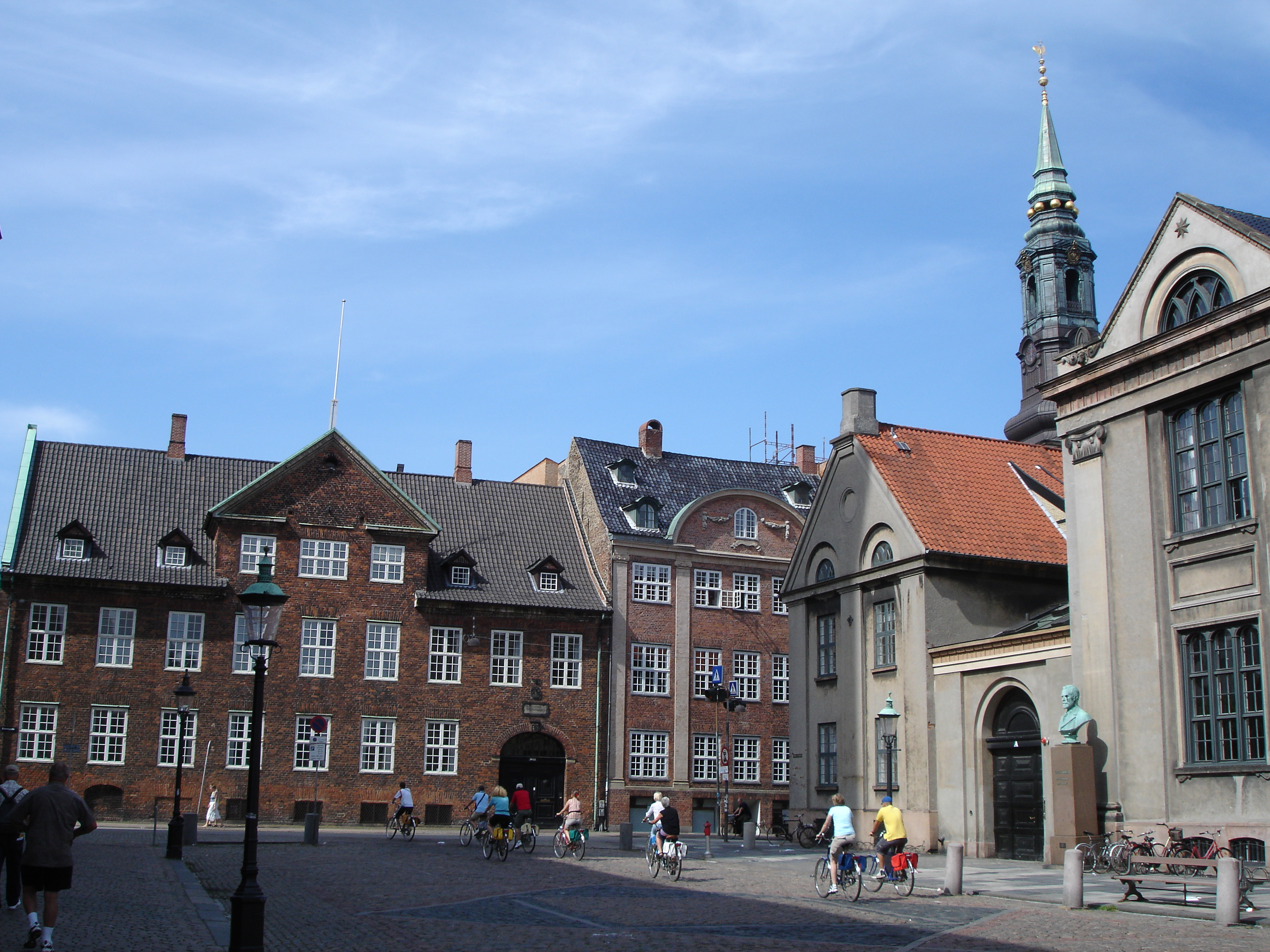
Statue of Niels Bohr (1956) outside the University of Copenhagen

Jørgen Gudmundsen-Holmgreen (15 June 1895 – 14 February 1966) was a Danish sculptor.

== Biography ==
Jørgen Gudmundsen-Holmgreen was born in Copenhagen. Son of the artist Johan Gudmundsen-Holmgreen (1858–1912) and Lauretta Vilhelmine Christensen (1862–1952), he was raised in an artistically gifted family. He spent several months studying with Holger Grønvold at the Copenhagen Technical College. Afterwards he was sent to Hanover to assist Anne Marie Carl-Nielsen in enlarging the sculpture of the horse for her equestrian statue of Christian IX. He studied sculpture under Anders Bundgaard from 1913 to 1915.

In 1915, he presented a statue of a boy, Niobide, at the Charlottenborg Spring Exhibition, earning him a scholarship allowing him to travel widely in Europe. He became interested in classical Greek sculpture which became a constant source of inspiration in his later busts. His bronze masterpiece Josef (1939) was the culmination of several years' work in crafting youthful figures. After visiting Tunis in 1947, he developed a more intuitive approach. Gudmundsen-Holmgreen received many official commissions thanks to his fine eye for facial and psychological expression, although he was less adept in creating clothed figures.

He exhibited at Den Frie Udstilling 1936–39, became a member in 1940 and then exhibited there regularly until his death. He received a number of scholarships including the Anckers Scholarship (1935), Kai Nielsen Memorial Scholarship (1941), Henri Nathansen Memorial Scholarship (1957), Ole Haslund Scholarship (1958) and Viggo Jarls Scholarship (1960). In 1946 he became a member of the Council of the Royal Danish Academy of Fine Arts. He received the Eckersberg Medal in 1946 and in 1965 the Thorvaldsen Medal.

One of Gudmundsen-Holmgreen's best known works is the bust of Niels Bohr (1956) which stands on Frue Plads outside the University of Copenhagen.

== Personal life ==
He was married in 1930 to Grete Søegaard (1908–1996). His brother Anders Gudmundsen-Holmgreen (1892–1967) was also an artist. His son Pelle Gudmundsen-Holmgreen (1932–2016) was a composer. He died at Copenhagen County Hospital in Gentofte. His interment was at Solbjerg Park Cemetery in Frederiksberg.
