= Borchs Kollegium =

Dormitory in Copenhagen, Denmark

Coordinates: 55°40′49.75″N 12°34′27.46″E

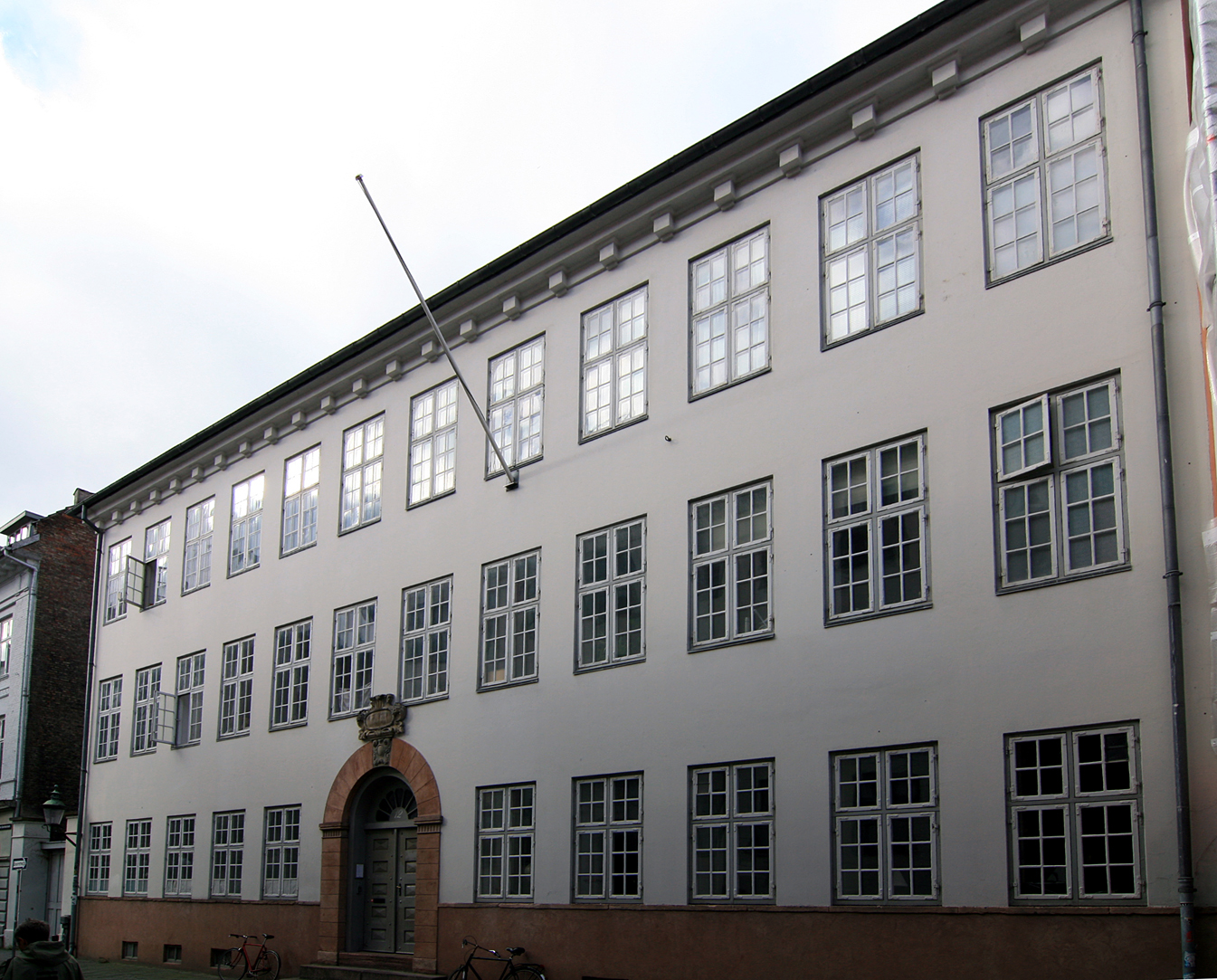
- Interactive map of the Borchs Kollegium area

General information
- Location: Copenhagen, Denmark
- Construction started: 1724
- Completed: 1725

Design and construction
- Architect: Peder Malling

Borchs Kollegium, originally known as Collegium Mediceum, is a university dormitory situated on Store Kannikestræde in the Old Town of Copenhagen, Denmark. It is one of the oldest dormitories of the University of Copenhagen. It was founded in 1691 but its current building, its third, is from 1825.

== The Building ==
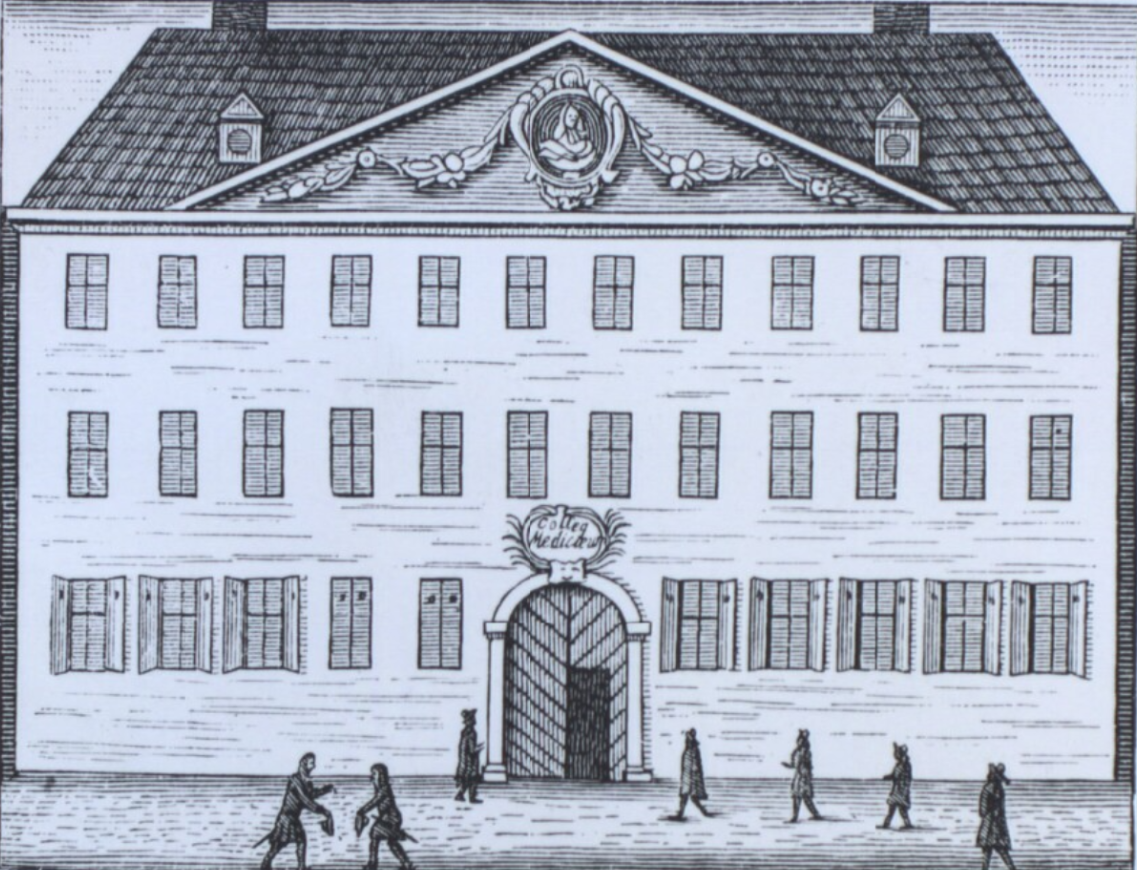
The main original building seen on a vignet from Borch's Conspectus Scriptorum Chemicorum. 1696

Borchs Kollegium was founded in 1690 by Ole Borch who was a chemist at the University of Copenhagen. The original house, complete with Borchs library and chemical laboratories was destroyed, along with much of the city in the Great Fire of Copenhagen in 1728. The house was rebuilt using remnants of the old walls, and stood ready three years and 5500 rigsdaler later, in 1731.

=== The second building ===
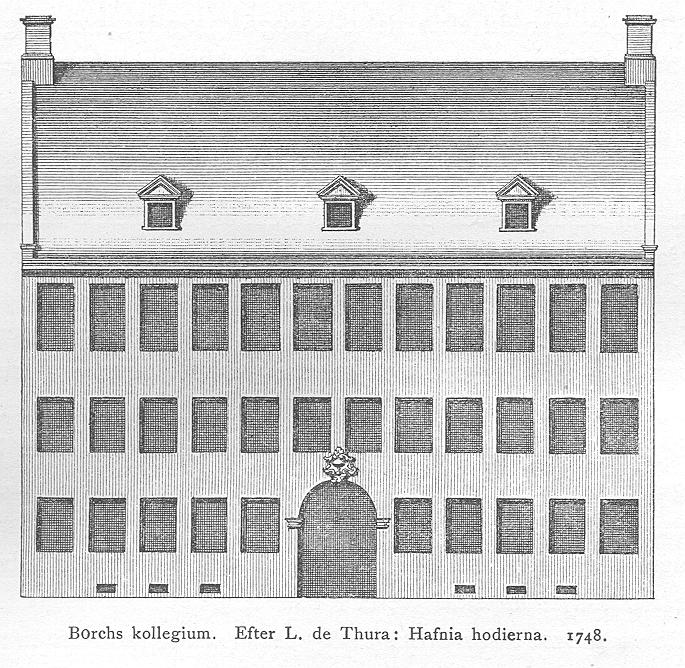
Borchs Kollegium in Lauritz de Thurah's, 1849

Because of Danish foreign policy in the beginning of the 19th century, Copenhagen was the scene of some conflict with the British navy. In the Battle of Copenhagen (1807) British forces decided to prevent Napoleon from getting hold of the Danish fleet. According to the history of Borchs Kollegium (see references) some of students of Borchs Kollegium participated in these skirmishes. Bombardments were especially heavy in the area around Vor Frue Plads and on the third day, September 4, fire broke out in the Kollegium and the building burned to the ground.

=== The third building ===
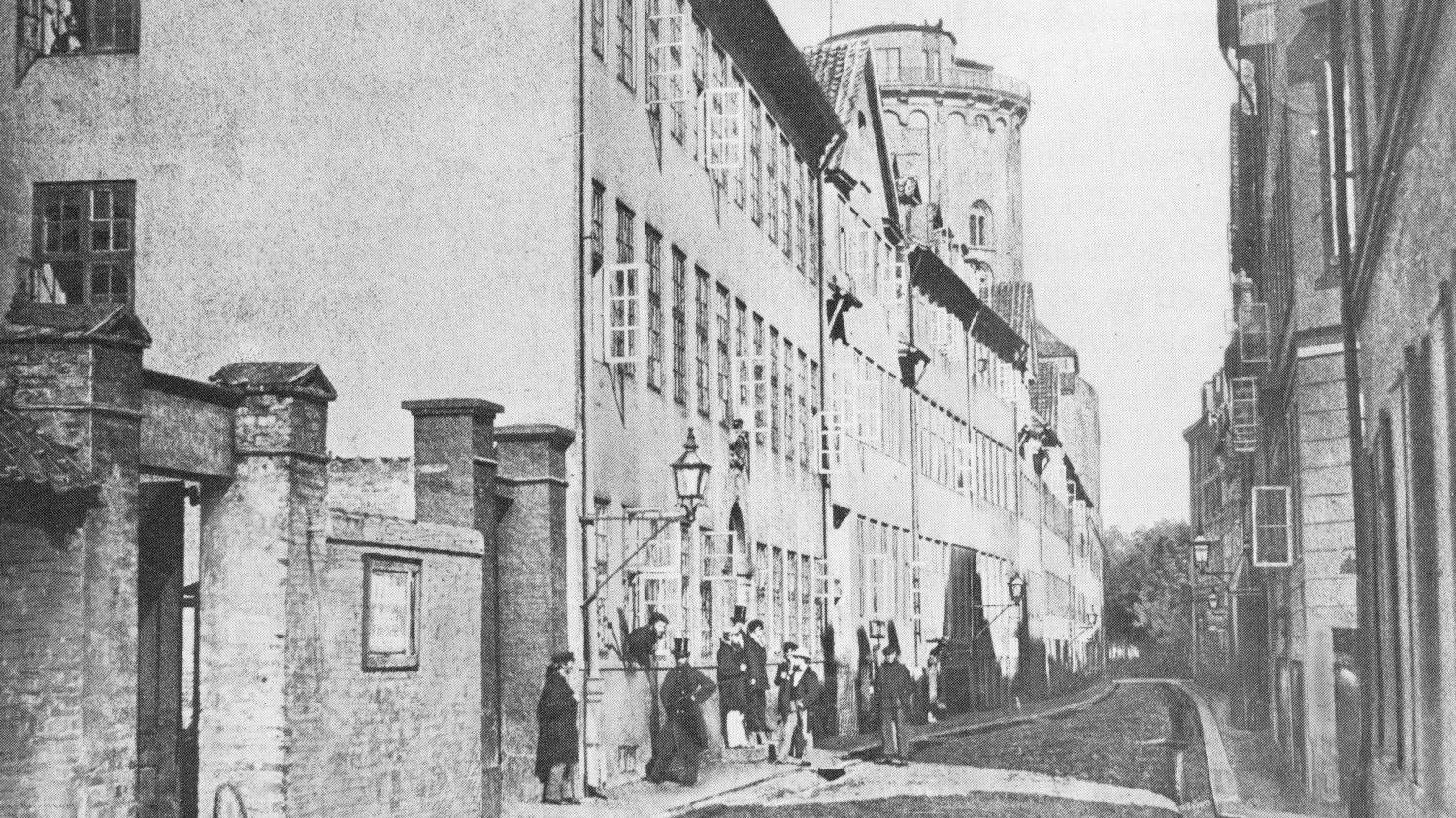
Students in front of Vurchs Kollegium, 1862

The third building – the house that stands today – was built in 1824–25 under supervision of architect Peder Malling. It was inaugurated on May 28, 1825.

== Residents ==
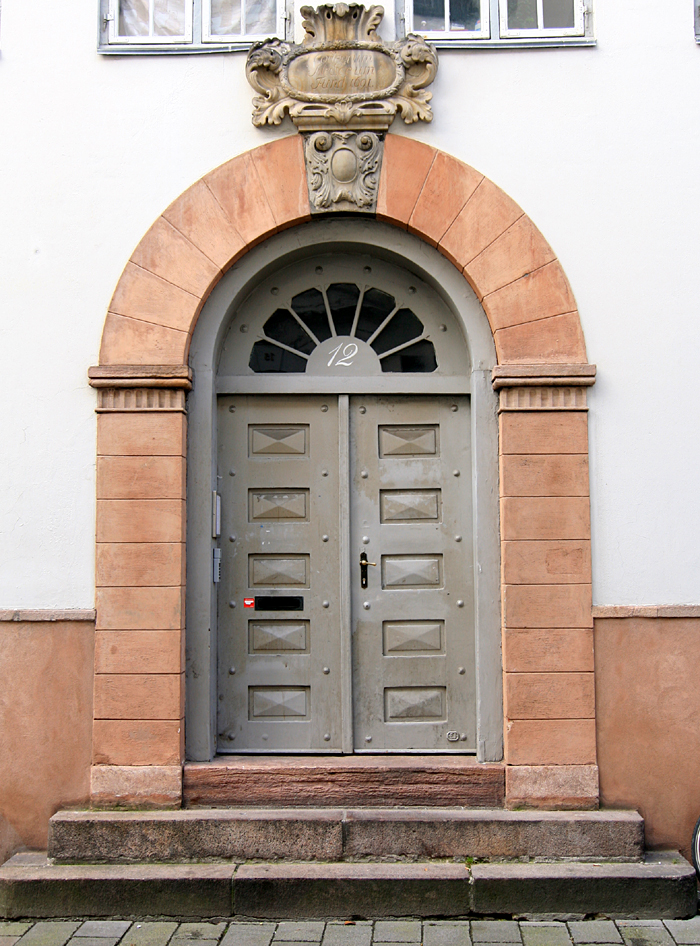
The main entrance

Many famous people have lived in Borchs Kollegium. Especially noteworthy is Ludvig Holberg - a famous Danish dramatist, essayist and historian. From 1748 to 1754 he was efor – head of the Kollegium. Also the Danish war hero Jens Paludan-Müller, student-resident no. 703, lived in Borchs Kollegium for two years before joining the Second war of Schleswig. He was killed near Sankelmark Lake on February 6, 1864, and a memorial stone in the garden of the Kollegium still commemorates this event. It reads:

| Jens Paludan-Müller Falden ved Sankelmark sø: 6. februar 1864; -- Indad Fremad Opad | Jens Paludan-Müller Fallen near Sankelmark Lake 6th of February 1864 -- Inward, Forward, Upward |
