= HDMS Stora Sofia =

Danish ship of the line

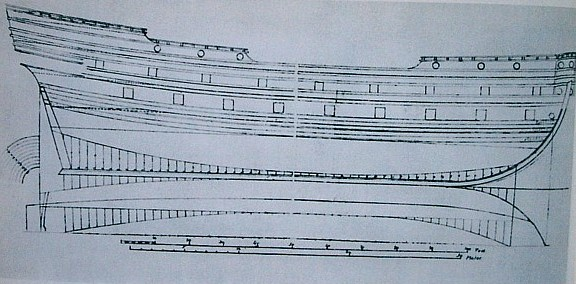
- Draught of Stora Sofia

History

Denmark & Norway
- Name: Stora Sofia
- Builder: Slottö shipyard in Nakskov
- Launched: 1627
- Fate: Sank on 25 May 1645 near Buskär

General characteristics
- Length: 147½ Danish feet
- Beam: 34 Danish feet
- Draught: 14⅓ Danish feet
- Complement: 1644: 280; 1627: 334
- Armament: 54-58 guns

Stora Sofia (Danish: Grand Sofia) (Note: The name is also sometimes spelled Sophia or Sancte Sophia) was a Danish ship of the line that sank on 25 May 1645 near Buskär outside the harbour of Gothenburg.

== Construction and design ==
The ship was built in 1627 on the Slottö shipyard in Nakskov in Denmark after a design of Scottish shipbuilder Daniel Sinclair. Stora Sofia was the flagship of the navy of the Danish king Christian IV. She was armed with 44 cannons on three decks; according to contemporary sources, she had four 48-pounders, eighteen 24-pounders, twenty 8-pounders and several smaller cannons.

== Service ==
During the short Torstenson War between Denmark–Norway and Sweden in 1645, Denmark put an embargo on the young city of Gothenburg, founded in 1621. Stora Sofia was the flagship of a Danish fleet under admiral Ove Gjedde that was ordered to enforce the embargo. Shortly after the arrival of the fleet, a storm broke loose and threw the Stora Sofia onto the rocks. The ship sank to a depth of 27 metres; her crew was saved.

== Discovery of the wreck ==
The wreck was rediscovered only in 1961. More thorough explorations and archeological studies began in the 1980s.

== See also ==
- Regalskeppet Vasa
