= Poul Christian Schindler =

Danish composer

Poul Christian Schindler (1648–1740) was a Danish composer.
