= Morten Steenwinkel =

Danish architect and painter

Morten Steenwinkel (6 July 1595, Varberg – 9 December 1646, Copenhagen), was a Danish architect and painter.

== Biography ==
According to Houbraken he was a good animal painter specialized in horses. In 1640 he came to the court of Christian IV where one of his life-sized horses was so well-painted that a live horse sprang at it thinking it was real.

According to the RKD he was the teacher of the Danish painter Bernhard Keil and the son of Hans Steenwinkel. He traveled to Italy in 1629. In 1632 he was back north where he became a member of the Antwerp Guild of Saint Luke. He was followed by Adriaen Hansz Muiltjes.

Selected works

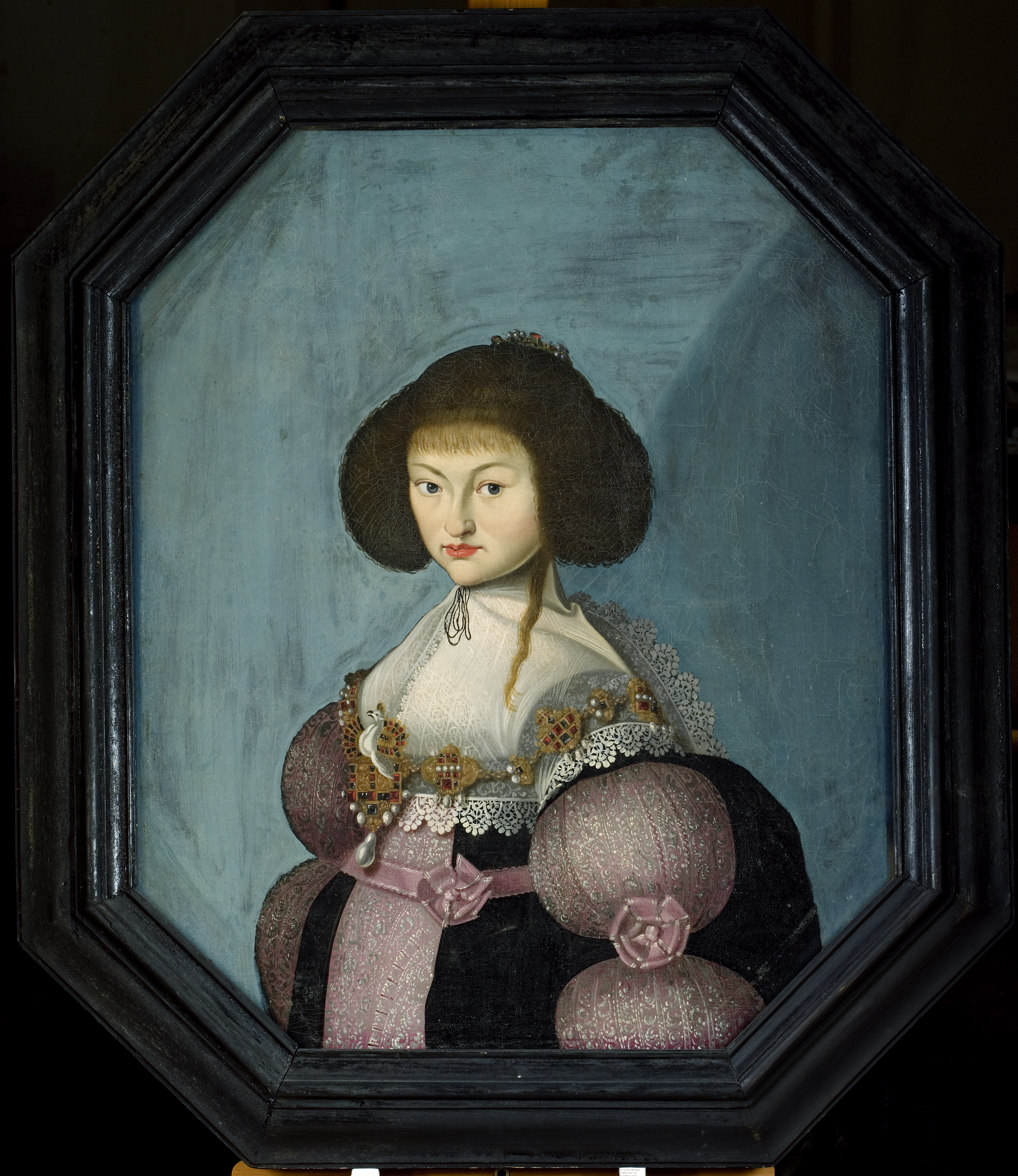
Magdalene Sibylle of Saxony

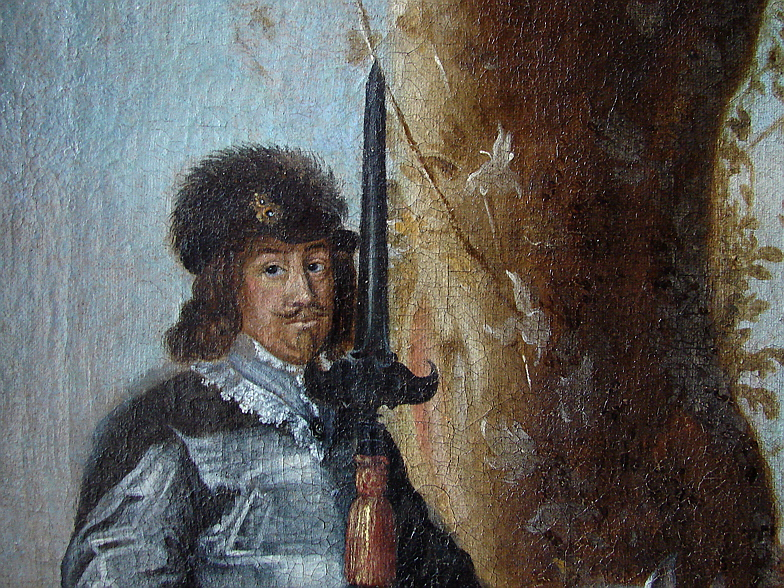
Christian, Prince Elect of Denmark
