= Theatrum Anatomico-chirurgicum =

Former anatomical theatr in Denmark

Theatrum Anatomico-chirurgicum was an anatomical theatre which existed from 1736 until 1785 in Copenhagen, Denmark. It was built as a replacement for Domus Anatomica which had been destroyed in the Copenhagen Fire of 1728 and was itself succeeded by the Royal Danish Academy of Surgery.

== History ==
The Anatomical-Surgical Theatre was inaugurated at Købmagergade on 30 April 1736. An exam in surgery was introduced at the same event. The new institution was independent from the University of Copenhagen and intensified an ongoing dispute between physicians educated at the university and surgeons (previously barbers).
