= Domus Anatomica =

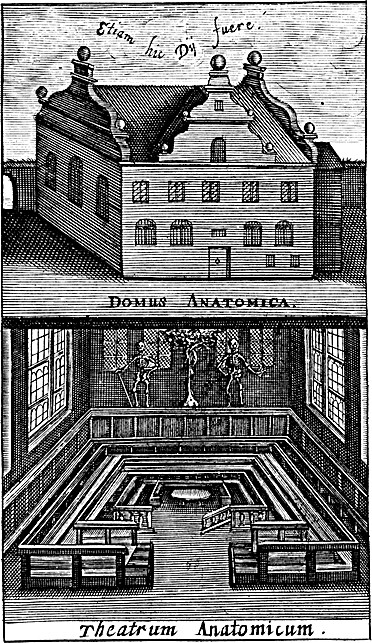
Domus Anatomica depicted in Thomas Bartholin's Cista medica Hafniensis from 1662

Domus Anatomica was an anatomical theatre which existed from 1644 until 1728 in Copenhagen, Denmark.

== History ==
There are references to a modest lectorium medicorum in Copenhagen from 1605 but in 1621 the statutes of the university stressed that the construction of a proper theatrum anatomicum would be desirable. In 1639 Christian IV called Simon Paulli to Copenhagen from Rostock, appointing him professor of anatomy, surgery and botany, and Paulli, in 1643, took the initiative of converting one of the university's buildings overlooking Church of Our Lady's graveyard (later Frue Plads) into the new Domus Anatomica. The new institution was completed the following year although Paulli did not hold his first public lecture until 3 March 1645.

Another scholar associated with the institution was Thomas Bartholin. He provides a detailed description of the building in his book Cista medica Hafniensis from 1662.

After his return to Copenhagen from Florence in 1681, Niels Steensen, who had made a name for himself internationally through his anatomical discoveries, revived the Domus Anatomica. His conversion to Catholicism disqualified him from a professorship; instead he had to make do with the title of Royal Anatomist. In 1674 he returned to Florence.

The building was completely destroyed in the Copenhagen Fire of 1728. Theatrum Anatomico-chirurgicum was built in its place.
