= Simon Paulli =

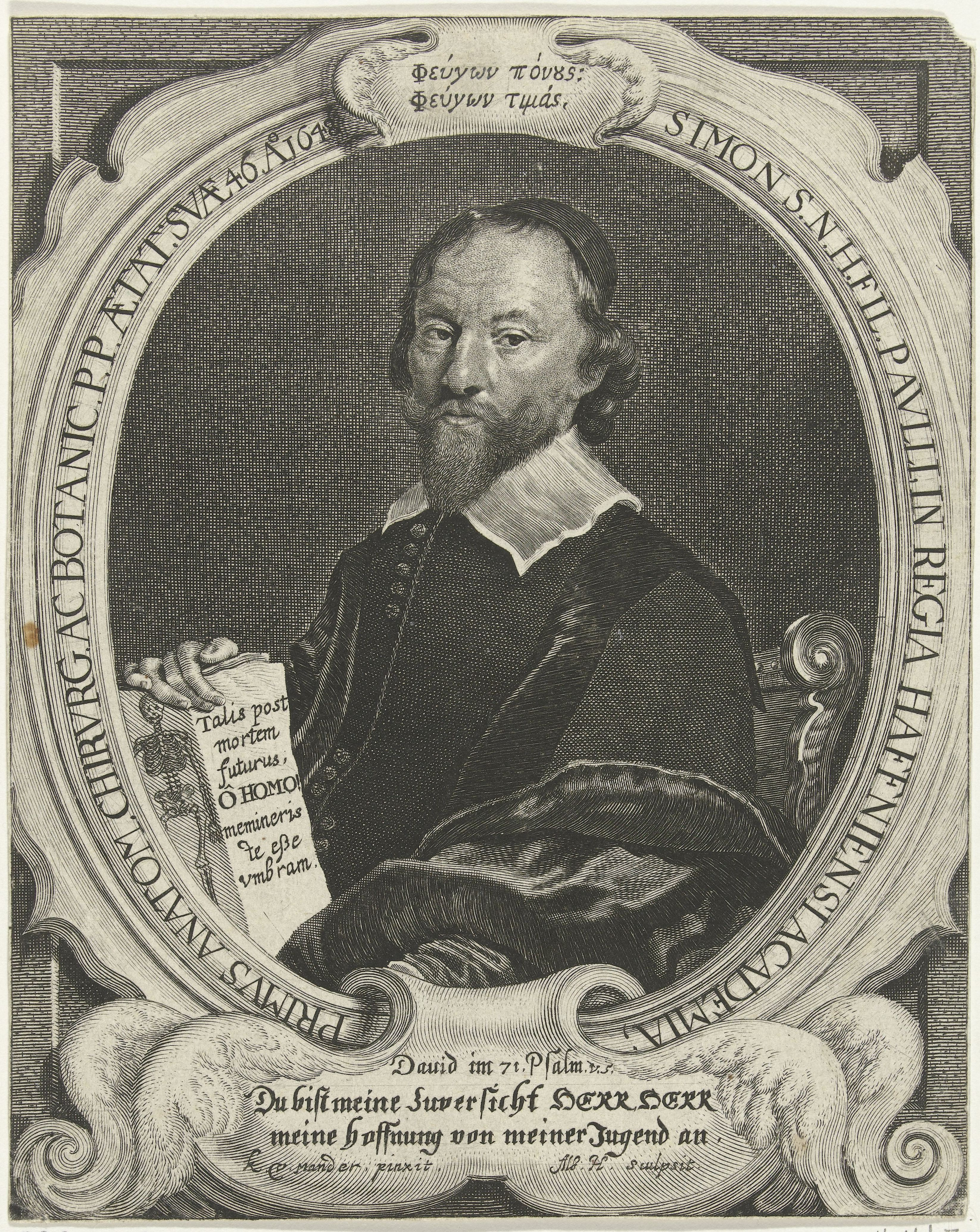
Simon Paulli

Simon Paulli (6 April 1603 – 25 April 1680), was a Danish physician and naturalist. He was a professor of anatomy, surgery and botany at the University of Copenhagen. The genus Paullinia is named after him.

Paulli was the first court physician to Frederick III of Denmark, and made valuable contributions to anatomy and botany. He authored and published several treatises in medicine and botany, notably, Quadripartitum Botanicum. He was also a driving force between the establishment of the Domus Anatomica, the first anatomical theatre in Copenhagen.

== Early life ==
Paulli was born at Rostock on 6 April 1603. His grandfather, Simon Paulli Sr., was a German theologian and first city superintendent of Rostock. His father, Henry Paulli, was a physician to the queen Dowager of Denmark. He had three sons: Jacob Henrik (1637–1702), an anatomist and diplomat in Danish services; Daniel (1640–1684), a bookseller and publisher in Copenhagen, also Simon printer and publisher in Strasbourg; and Olliger (Holger) Paulli (1644–1714), a successful merchant, secretary to the Danish East India Company, journalist and publisher.

Paulli was schooled in several places, including Rostock, Leiden, Paris and Copenhagen. He matriculated from the University of Copenhagen between 1626 and 1629. He received his M.D from Wittenberg. He worked as a physician in Rostock and Lübeck as a medical practitioner and later became professor of anatomy at Finck College. With the aid of Frederick III, he established an "Anatomical theatre" at Copenhangen. He died on 25 April 1680 at Copenhagen.

== Works ==
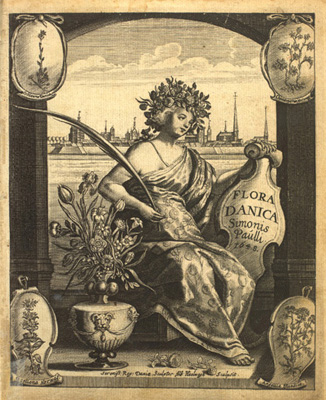
Flora danica front page

- Quadripartitum, De Simplicium medicamentorum Facultatibus. Rostock 1639—New, enlarged edition: Strasbourg, 1667–1668:- a Latin quarto on medicinal plants
- Flora Danica, Det er: Dansk Urtebog. Copenhagen 1648.
- Commentarius De Abusu Tabaci Americanorum Veteri, Et Herbæ Thee Asiaticorum in Europe Novo:- This work against tobacco and tea was published in 1661. It was later translated into English by 'Dr. James' in 1746 as A treatise on tobacco, tea, coffee, and chocolate. In which I. The advantages and disadvantages attending the use of these commodities.
- Anatomisch- und Medizinisches Bedenken. 1672

== Honor ==
The Paullinia, genus of flowering shrubs, small trees and lianas in the soapberry family in botany is named in honour of him.
