= 1643 in Denmark =

Events from the year 1643 in Denmark.

== Incumbents ==
- Monarch – Christian IV
- Steward of the Realm – Corfitz Ulfeldt

== Events ==
- 1 October – The wedding of Crown Prince Frederick (III) and Sophie Amalie of Brunswick-Calenberg takes place at Castle Glücksburg.

=== Undated ===
- Start of the Torstenson War (1643–1645)

== Births ==
- 19 February – Bolle Luxdorph, civil servant and landowner (died 1698 in Sweden)

=== Full date missing ===
- Marie Grubbe, noblewoman (died 1718)

== Deaths ==
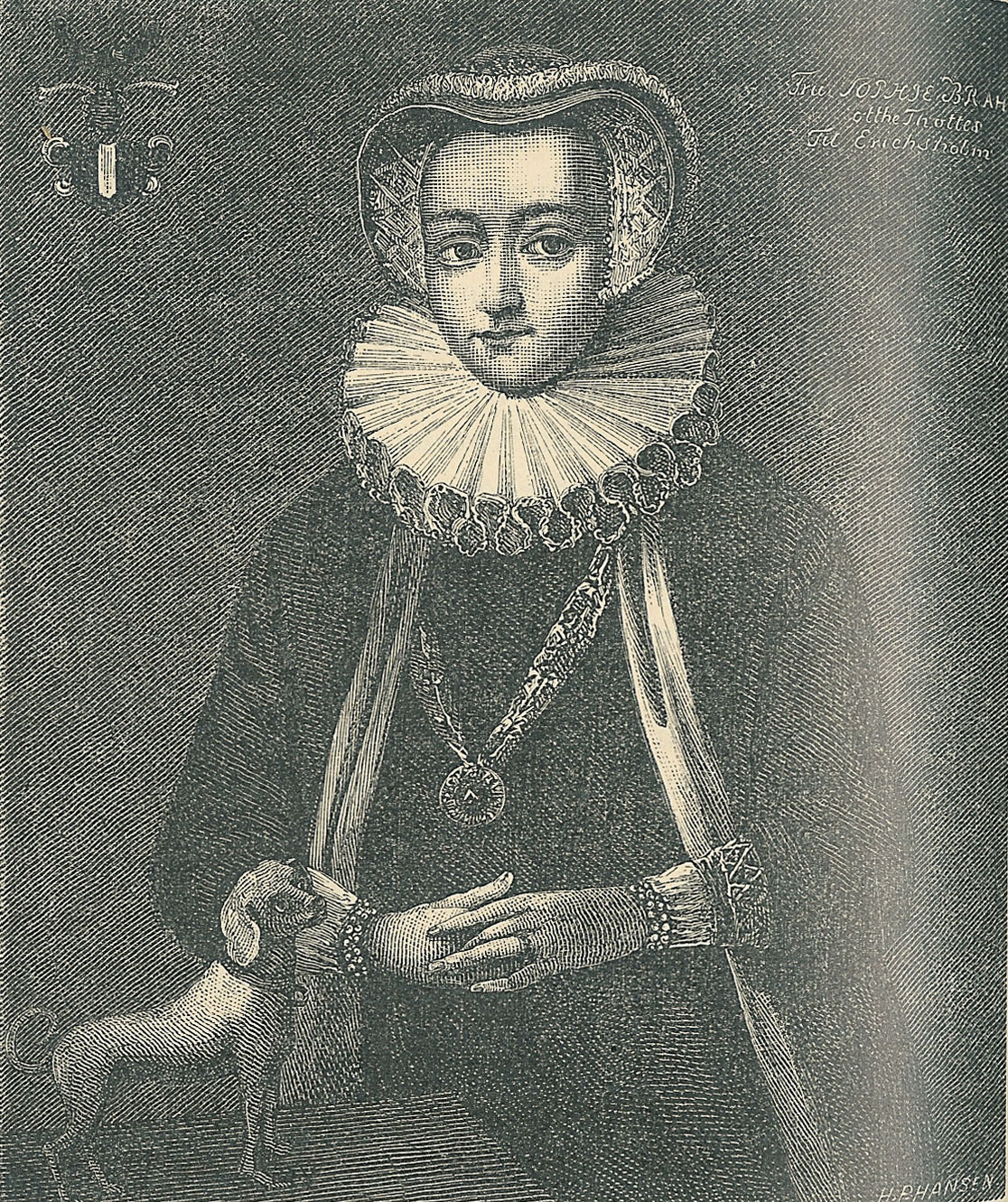
Sophia Brahe.

- Sophia Brahe, horticulturalist and student of astronomy, chemistry and medicine (born 1556)
