= 1560s in Denmark =

Events from the 1560s in Denmark.

== Incumbents ==
- Monarch – Frederick II
- Steward of the Realm – Peder Oxe (from 1567)

== Events ==
- 1561 – Æbelholt Abbey is demolished by royal order and much of its stone is used to construct Frederiksborg Castle.
- 1565 – Herlufsholm School is established in Copenhagen.

=== Northern Seven Years' War ===
The Northern Seven Years' War broke out in 1563 between the Kingdom of Sweden and a coalition of Denmark–Norway, Lübeck, and Poland–Lithuania. The conflict was resolved in 1570 with the Treaty of Stettin.

- 30 May 1563 – Battle of Bornholm
- 11 September 1563 – Battle of Öland
- 9 November 1563 – Battle of Mared
- 30–31 May 1564 – First battle of Öland
- 12 July 1564 – Action of 12 July 1564
- 14 August 1564 – Action of 14 August 1564
- 4 September 1564 – The Ronneby Bloodbath take place in Ronneby.
- 21 May 1565 – Battle of Rügen
- 4 June 1565 – Action of 4 June 1565
- 7 July 1565 – Action of 7 July 1565
- 20 October 1565 – Battle of Axtorna
- 26 July 1566 – Action of 26 July 1566
- 9 August 1566 – Battle of Brobacka
- 18 and 22 November 1568 – the Treaties of Roskilde were negotiated, but ultimately not ratified.
- November 1569 – Siege of Varberg

== Births ==
1561

- 6 January – Thomas Fincke, mathematician and physicist (died 1656)

1562

- 3 March – Gellio Sasceride, astronomer and physician (died 1610)
- 4 October – Christen Sørensen Longomontanus, astronomer (died 1647)

1566

- 18 November – Sivert Beck, landowner and treasurer (died 1623)

1567

- June 25 – Jacob Ulfeldt, diplomat, explorer, and chancellor (died 1630)

Full date unknown

- c. 1569 Pieter Isaacsz, painter (died 1625)

== Deaths ==
1560

- 3 January – Peder Palladius, bishop (born 1503)

1561

- 11 November – Hans Tausen, Lutheran theologian (born 1494)

1565

- 21 June – Jørgen Thygesen Brahe, nobleman (born 1515)
- 25 June – Herluf Trolle, admiral (born 1516)
- 11 October – Otte Rud, admiral during the Northern Seven Years' War, died in Swedish captivity (born 1520)
- 12 December – Johan Rantzau, general and statesman (born 1492)

1569

- 29 June – Otte Krumpen, Marshal (born 1480)
- 9 October – Mogens Gyldenstierne (born 1480s)
