= 1480s in Denmark =

Events from the 1480s in Denmark.

== Incumbents ==
- Monarch — King Christian I (until 21 May 1481), King John
- Steward of the Realm — Erik Ottesen Rosenkrantz (1456–80), Strange Nielsen Strangesen Bild (1482–87), Poul Laxmand (1489–1502)

== Events ==
- 1481 – John becomes King of Denmark
- 1482 – Copenhagen University Library is founded.
- 1484 – Køge Friary is founded on land donated by the king.

== Births ==
- 1 July 1481 – Christian II of Denmark (d. 1559)
- 24 June 1485 – Elizabeth of Denmark, Electress of Brandenburg (d. 1555 in Germany)

=== Date unknown ===
- c. 1480 – Christiern Pedersen, scholar and publisher (d. 1554)
- c. 1480 – Eske Bille, diplomat and statesman (d. 1552)
- c. 1482 – Willehad of Denmark, one of the Martyrs of Gorkum (d. 1572)
- c. 1484 – Jacob the Dacian, Franciscan missionary to the Purépecha (d. 1566)
- c. 1484 – Skipper Clement, leader of the peasant rebellion that was part of Count's Feud (d. 1536)
- c. 1485 – Stygge Krumpen, last bishop of Børglum (d. 1551)
- c. 1489 – Hans Rev, last pre-Reformation Bishop of Oslo (d. 1545)

== Deaths ==
1481

- 21 May – Christian I, King of Denmark, Norway and Sweden (born 1421)

1483

- 18 May – Christina of Saxony, Queen consort of Denmark (born 1461 in Saxony)

1486

- 23 June – Margaret of Denmark, Queen of Scotland (born 1456)
