= 1550s in Denmark =

Events from the 1550s in Denmark.

== Incumbents ==
- Monarch – Christian III (until 1 January 1559), Frederick II
- Steward of the Realm – Eske Bille (until 1552)

== Events ==
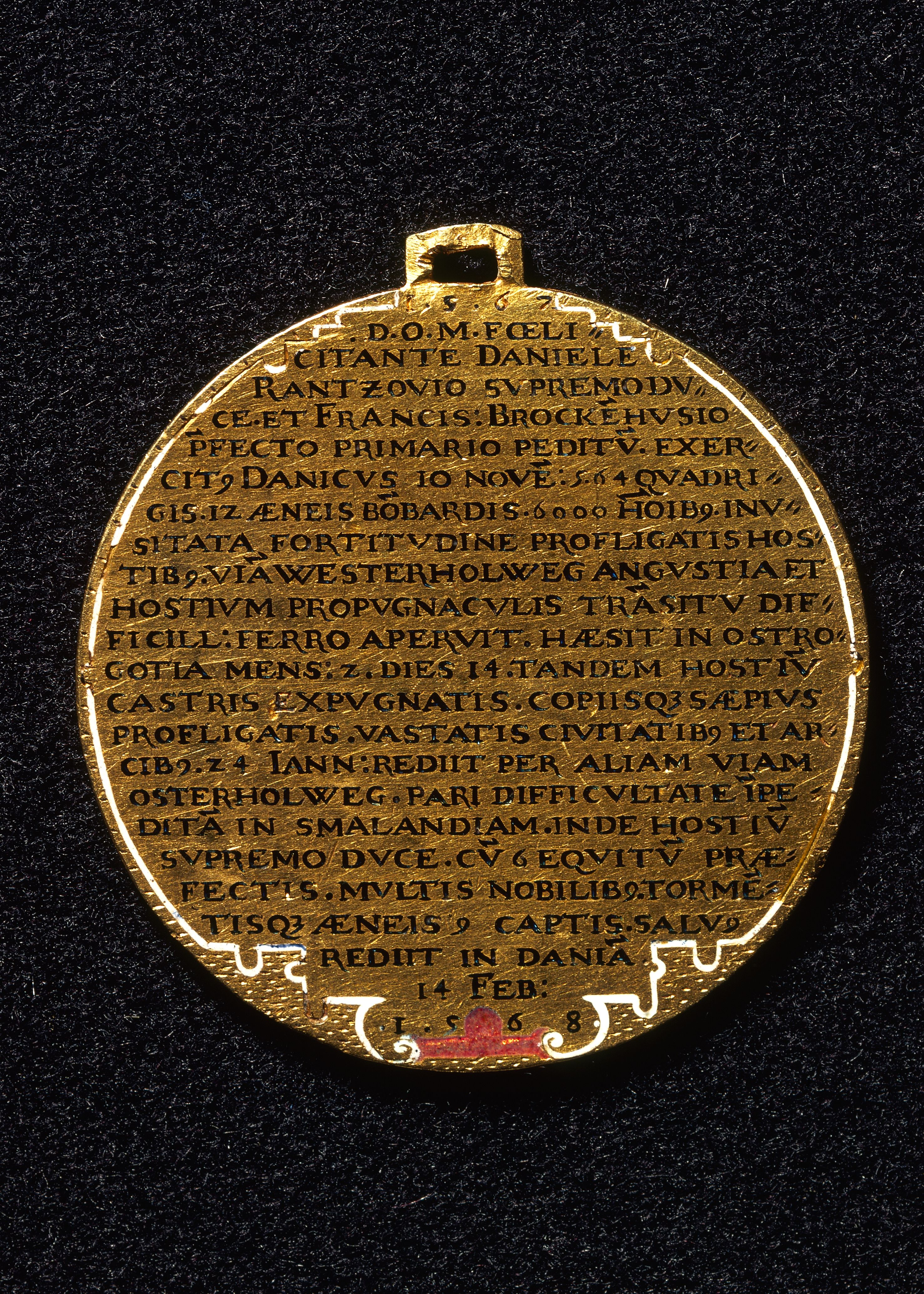
1556: Medal commemorating Daniel Rantzau.

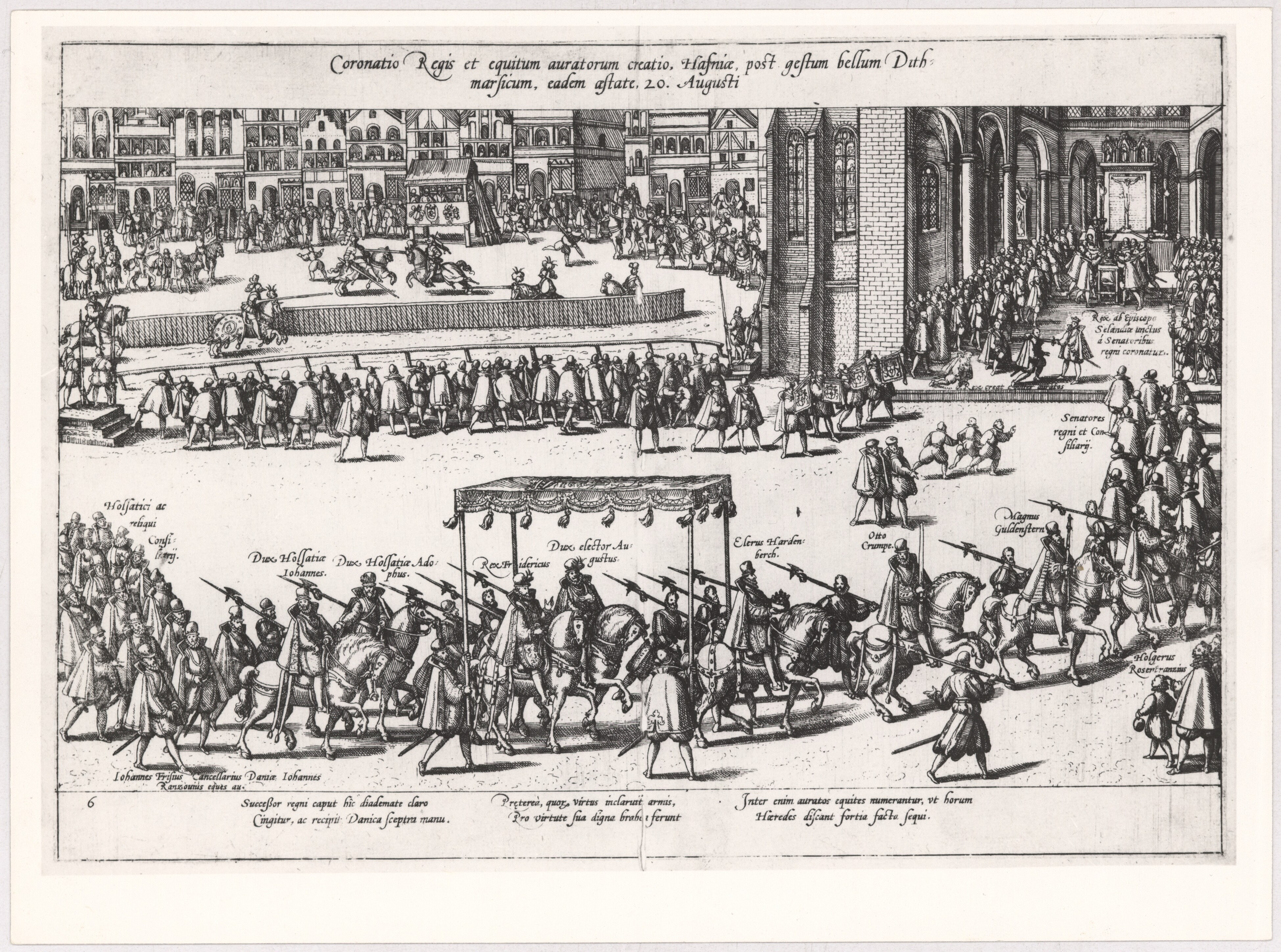
20 August 1559: Coronatio Regis et equitum auratorum creatio, Hafniæ, post gestum bellum Dithmarsicum, eadem æstate, 20. Augusti.

1550

- The construction of Hesselagergård Manor is completed.

1554

- Otte Krumpen succeeds Erik Eriksen Banner as Marshal of the Realm.

1559

- 20 August – The coronation of Frederick II of Denmark.

== Births ==
- 28 October 1554 – Enevold Kruse, noble and Governor-general of Norway (died 1621)
- 24 August 1556 – Sophia Brahe, noble (died 1643)

Undated

- c. 1558 – Christence Kruckow, noble and accused witch (died 1621)

== Deaths ==
1551

- 21 January – Stygge Krumpen, bishop (b. c. 1485)

1552

- 9 February – Eske Bille, diplomat and statesman (b. c. 1480)

1554

- 16 January – Christiern Pedersen, scholar and publisher (b. c. 1480)

1555

- Mads Hak, composer (date unknown)
- 10 April – Ove Bille, bishop and royal chancellor

1556

- Gertrud Skomagers, alleged witch (date unknown)
- 7 October – Frederick of Denmark, bishop and son of Frederick I of Denmark and Sophie of Pomerania (b. 1532)

1558

- 4 January – Claus Bille, nobleman (b. c. 1490)
- 19 September – Cornelis Altenau, Danish-German architect

1559

- 1 January – Christian III, King of Denmark and Norway (b. 1503)
- 25 January – Christian II, King of Denmark, Norway and Sweden, forced to abdicate in 1523 (b. 1481)
- 3 August – Andreas von Barby, nobleman
- 14 October – Jens Tillufssøn Bjelke, Danish-Norwegian nobleman (b. 1508)
- 19 December – Jørgen Sadolin, Lutheran reformer (b. c. 1490)
