= 1530s in Denmark =

Events from the 1530s in Denmark.

== Incumbents ==
- Monarch – Frederick I (until 10 April 1533), Christian III
- Steward of the Realm — Mogens Gøye

== Events ==
1534

- May – After Frederik I's death, a war of succession begins between supporters of the Catholic Christian II and the Protestant Christian III. The conflict becomes known as the Count's Feud.
- 16 October – In the Battles of Svenstrup, Skipper Clement's peasant army, re-enforced with professional soldiers from Count Christoffer, defeats the army of the Jutland nobility that had been sent to crush the revolt.
- 18 December – A royal army led by Johan Rantzau defeats Clement's men at Aalborg where they have sort refuge. Clement is captured a few days later.

1535

- 11 June – In the Battle of Øksnebjerg, on the island of Funen, Rantzau decisively defeats the rest of Count Christoffer's army.

1536

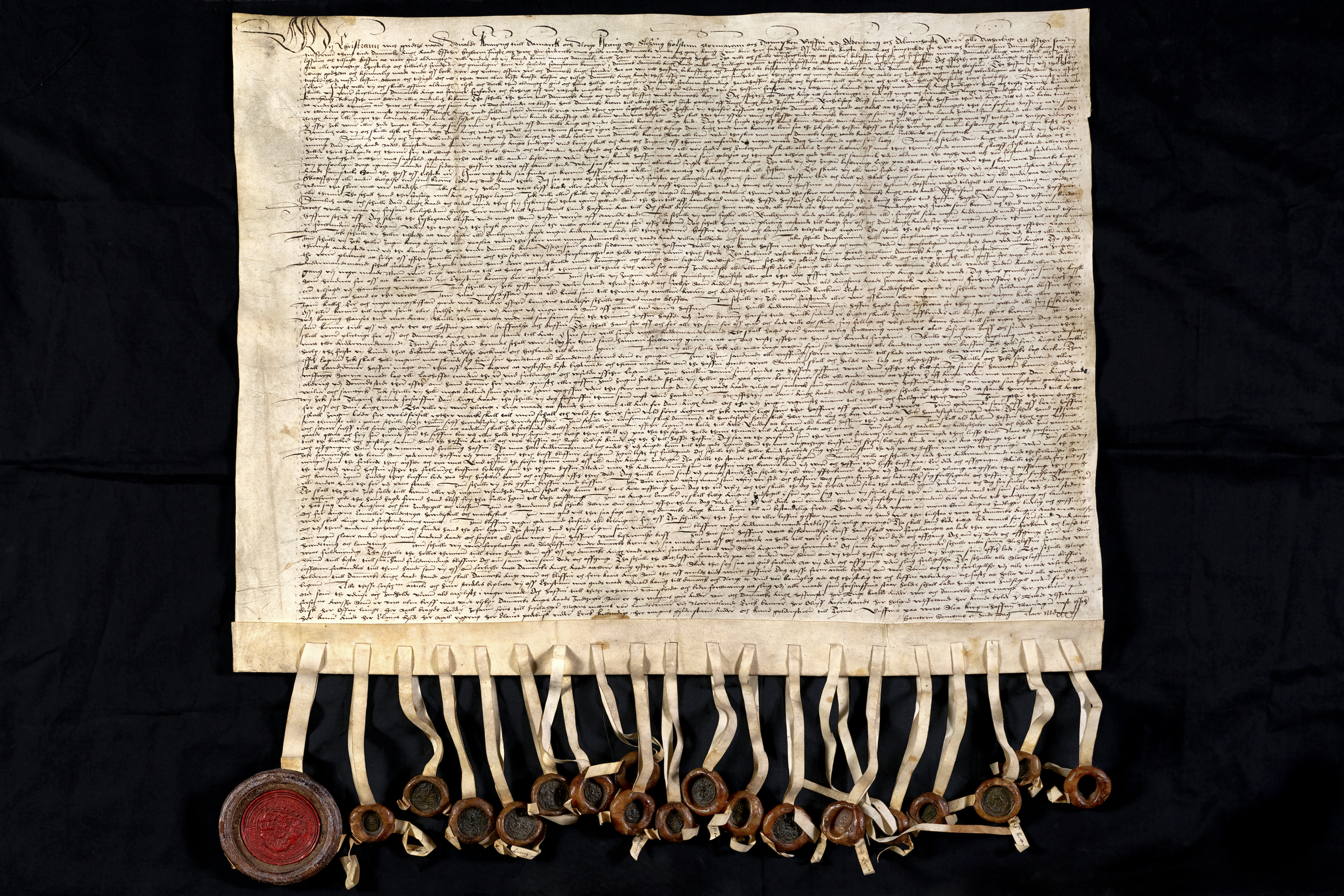
30 October: Christian III's håndfæstning.

- 29 July – The last supporters of Christian II are defeated, ending the Count's Feud.
- 30 October
  - The Council of Noblemen agreed to the introduction of the Reformation 30 October 1536
  - Christian III's håndfæstning-

1537

- Christian III did a coup d'état in Norway and made it a hereditary kingdom in a real union with Denmark that would last until 1814.
- 2 September – Peder Palladius is ordained as the first Lutheran bishop of the Diocese of Zealand.

== Births ==
1532

- 27 March – Eiler Grubbe, statesman and landholder /died 1585)
- 15 April – Frederick of Denmark, bishop and son of Frederick I of Denmark and Sophie of Pomerania (died 1556)
- 22 November – Anne of Denmark, Electress of Saxony, princess of Denmark (died 1585 in Saxony)

1534

- 1 July – Frederick II of Denmark, king of Denmark and Norway (died 1588)

1535

- 13 March – Oluf Mouridsen Krognos, privy councillor and landowner (died 1573)
- Jacob Ulfeldt, diplomat and privy councillor (died 1593)
- Niels Kaas, statesman (died 1594)

1537

- Ludvig Munk, count and governor (died 1602)

== Deaths ==
1530

- Søren Norby, naval officer

1533

- 10 April – Frederick I, King of Denmark and Norway (born 1470)
- 3 May – Henrik Gøye, governor and landowner

1535

- Gustav Trolle, clergy (born 1488 in Sweden)

1536

- 6 September – Skipper Clement, privateer (born 1484)

1537

- Jens Andersen Beldenak, clergy
