= 1470s in Denmark =

Events from the 1470s in Denmark.

== Incumbents ==
- Monarch – Christian I
- Steward of the Realm – Erik Ottesen Rosenkrantz

== Events ==
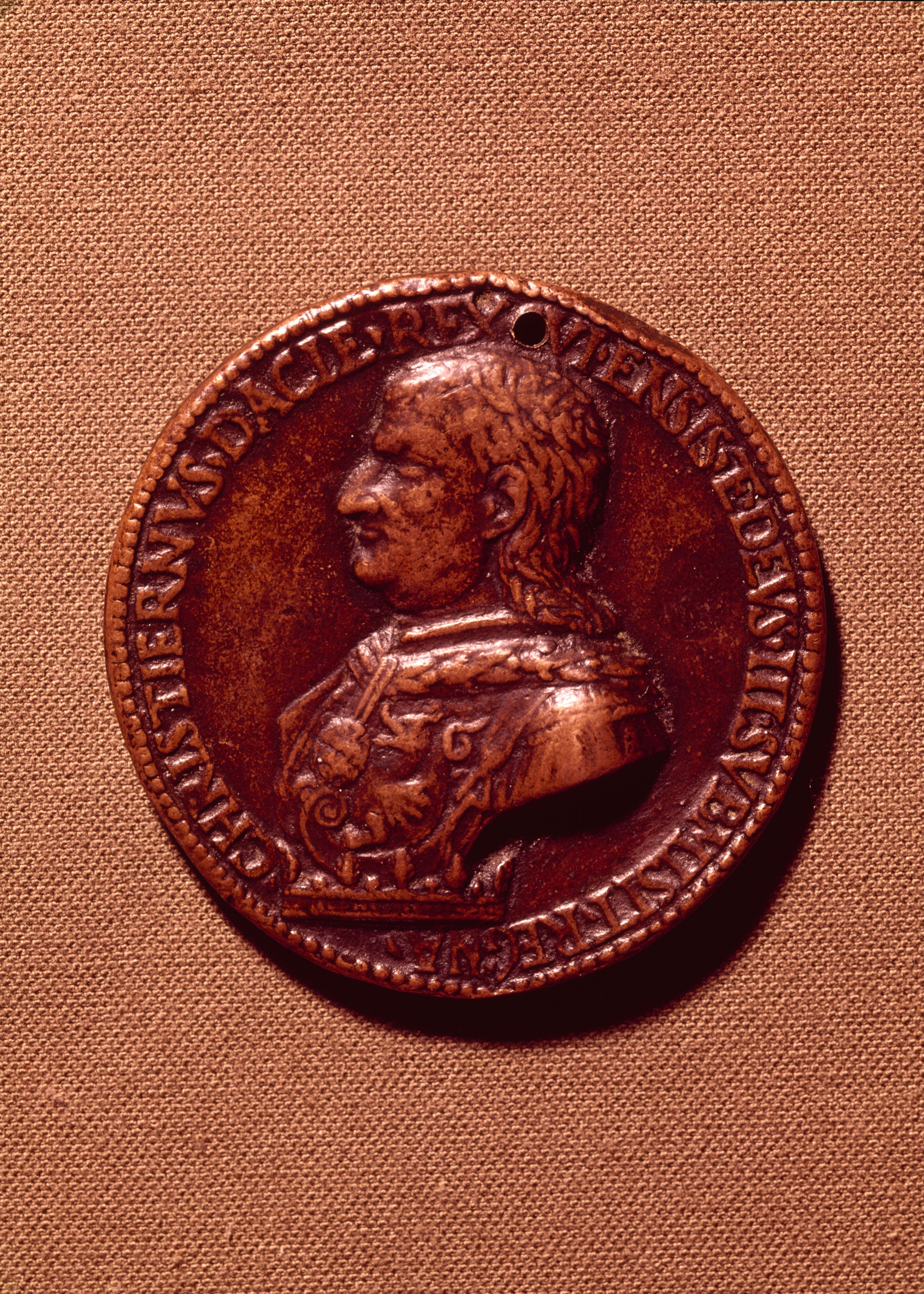
Medal commemorating Christian I's visit to Rome. It is the first medal featuring the portrait of a Danish monarch..

1471

- 10 October – The Battle of Brunkeberg.

1474

- April – Christian I visits Milan and Rome.
- Christian I visits Burgundy.
- 1475
- 30 September – Christian I issues a royal order that farmers are only allowed to trade with citizens from market towns. People in the countryside are only allowed to buy products for their own use.

1479

- 1 June – University of Copenhagen is inaugurated by King Christian I.

== Births ==
- c. 1470 – Mogens Gøye, statesman (died 1544)
- 7 October 1471 – Frederick I of Denmark, King of Denmark and Norway (died 1533)
- 1473 – Otte Krumpen, Marshal (died 1569)

== Deaths ==
=== Full date missing ===
- Tetz Rosengaard. arch dean and Royal Chancellor (born unknown)
