= 1520s in Denmark =

Events from the 1520s in Denmark.

== Incumbents ==
- Monarch – Christian II (until 1523), Frederick I
- Steward of the Realm – Mogens Gøye (from 1523)

== Events ==
1521

- 5 February – the Battle of Falun ignites the Swedish War of Liberation. Falun is captured by Swedish forces.
- early April – Danish and Norwegian forces are driven out of Brunnbäck following their defeat at the Battle of Brunnbäck Ferry.
- 29 April – Västerås is captured by Swedish forces after the defeat of Danish forces in the Battle of Västerås.

1523

- 27 May – Uppsala is captured by Swedish rebels after the defeat of Danish forced at the Conquest of Kalmar.
- 17 June – the Conquest of Stockholm drives out the last of the Danish forces from Stockholm.
- 7 August – Frederick I is crowned King after Christian II is forced to abdicate by the nobility.

1524

- 1 September – the Treaty of Malmö officially ends the Swedish War of Liberation (1521–1523), ending the Kalmar Union between Denmark, Norway, and Sweden by acknowledging the independent status of Sweden and forming the union of Denmark–Norway.
- Undated – Sæby is incorporated as a market town.

1525

- Hans Tausen begins preaching Lutheran doctrines in Viborg.
- Tyge Krabbe succeeds Otte Krumpen as Marshal of the Realm.

== Births ==
1520

- 7 January – Peder Oxe, statesman (died 1575)
- 10 May – Otte Rud, admiral during the Northern Seven Years' War (died 1565)
- 10 November – Dorothea of Denmark, princess of Denmark and Electress Palatine (died 1580)
- Undated – Christen Munk, Governor-general of Norway (died 1579)

1521

- 21 June – John the Elder, prince of Denmark and Duke of Schleswig-Holstein-Haderslev (died 1580)
- November – Christina of Denmark, princess of Denmark and Duchess-consort of Milan (died 1590)

1524

- 14 October – Elizabeth of Denmark, princess of Denmark and a Duchess of Mecklenburg (died 1586)

1525

- 1 September – Christoffer Valkendorff, statesman (died 1601)

1526

- 25 January – Adolf, Duke of Holstein-Gottorp, prince of Denmark (died 1586)
- 30 April – Beate Clausdatter Bille, noblewoman and vassal (died 1605)

1528

- Dorothea of Denmark, princess of Denmark and Duchess consort of Mecklenburg (died 1575)

Undated

- Christen Munk (c. 1520), Governor-general of Norway (died 1579)
- Povel Huitfeldt (c. 1520), Governor-general of Norway (died 1592)
- Melchior Lorck (c. 1526), painter and printmaker (died c. 1583)

== Deaths ==
- 8 December 1521 – Christina of Saxony, Queen consort of Denmark, Norway and Sweden (born 1461 in Saxony)
- 24 January 1522 – Didrik Slagheck, Roman Catholic archbishop of Lund
- 30 May 1526 – Morten Børup, educator and writer (born c. 1446)
