= Treaties of Roskilde (1568) =

1568 peace treaties between Denmark–Norway, Lübeck, and Sweden

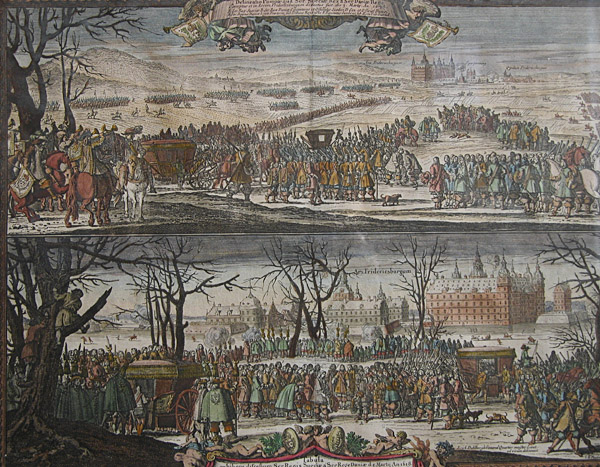
- The procession to Frederiksborg Castle for the peace banquet following the signing of the Treaty of Roskilde
- Type: Trilateral treaty
- Context: Northern Seven Years' War
- Drafted: 18 and 22 November 1568
- Condition: Not ratified
- Parties: Sweden; Denmark–Norway; City of Lübeck

The Treaties of Roskilde of 18 and 22 November 1568 were peace treaties between the kingdoms of Denmark–Norway and the allied Free and Hanseatic City of Lübeck on one side, and the Swedish kingdom on the other side, intended to end the Northern Seven Years' War after the de facto succession of the later king John III. Negotiated on John's initiative, he ultimately refused ratification, viewing the concessions his envoys made in Roskilde as too far-reaching. Most notably these concessions included Swedish obligations to pay Denmark–Norway her war costs and to cede Swedish Estonia.

Thus, the war dragged on until it was concluded by the Treaty of Stettin (1570).

== Background ==
Parties
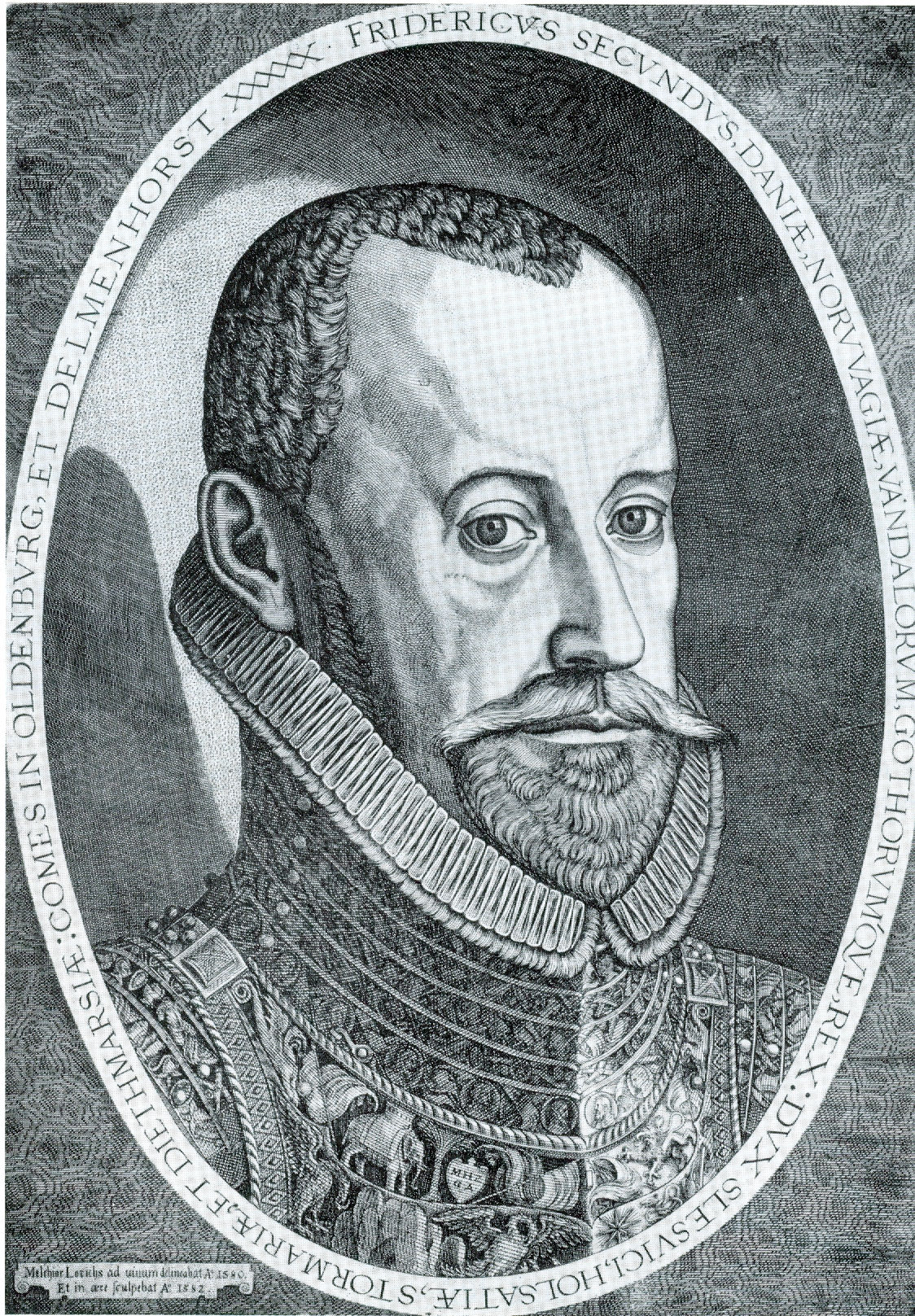
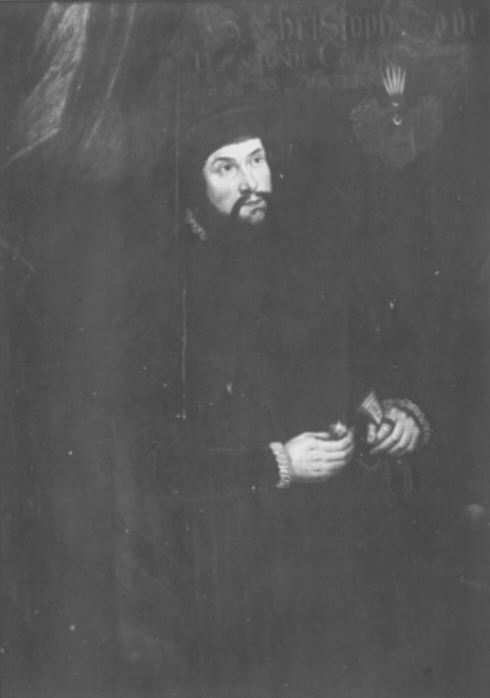
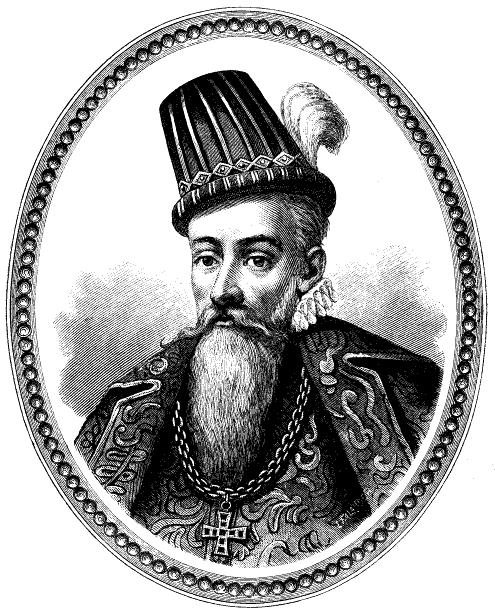
Frederik II of Denmark (left), Lübeck bürgermeister Christoph Tode (centre) and Duke John of Finland, since 1569 king John III of Sweden (right)

After the Swedish King Erik XIV had become insane and murdered leading aristocrats in late 1567, his brother Duke John (the later King John III) assumed control of the kingdom and had Erik imprisoned. When this was accomplished, he sent a delegation to Denmark to negotiate for an end of the Northern Seven Years' War inherited from his brother. Frederik II of Denmark was unable to exploit the inner-Swedish conflict, as his treasury was drained by the costs of his German mercenary armies, on which he had relied throughout the war, and the rebuilding of the Danish navy, finished by the summer of 1567, after a large part of it had sunk in a storm in July 1566. Furthermore, duke John maintained amicable relations to Sigismund II Augustus of Poland–Lithuania, thwarting hopes for an anti-Swedish alliance in the contemporary Livonian War.

== Terms ==
Danish delegation
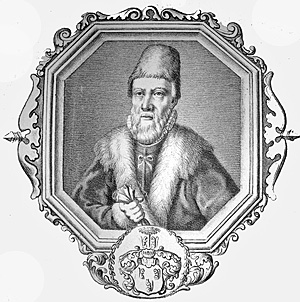
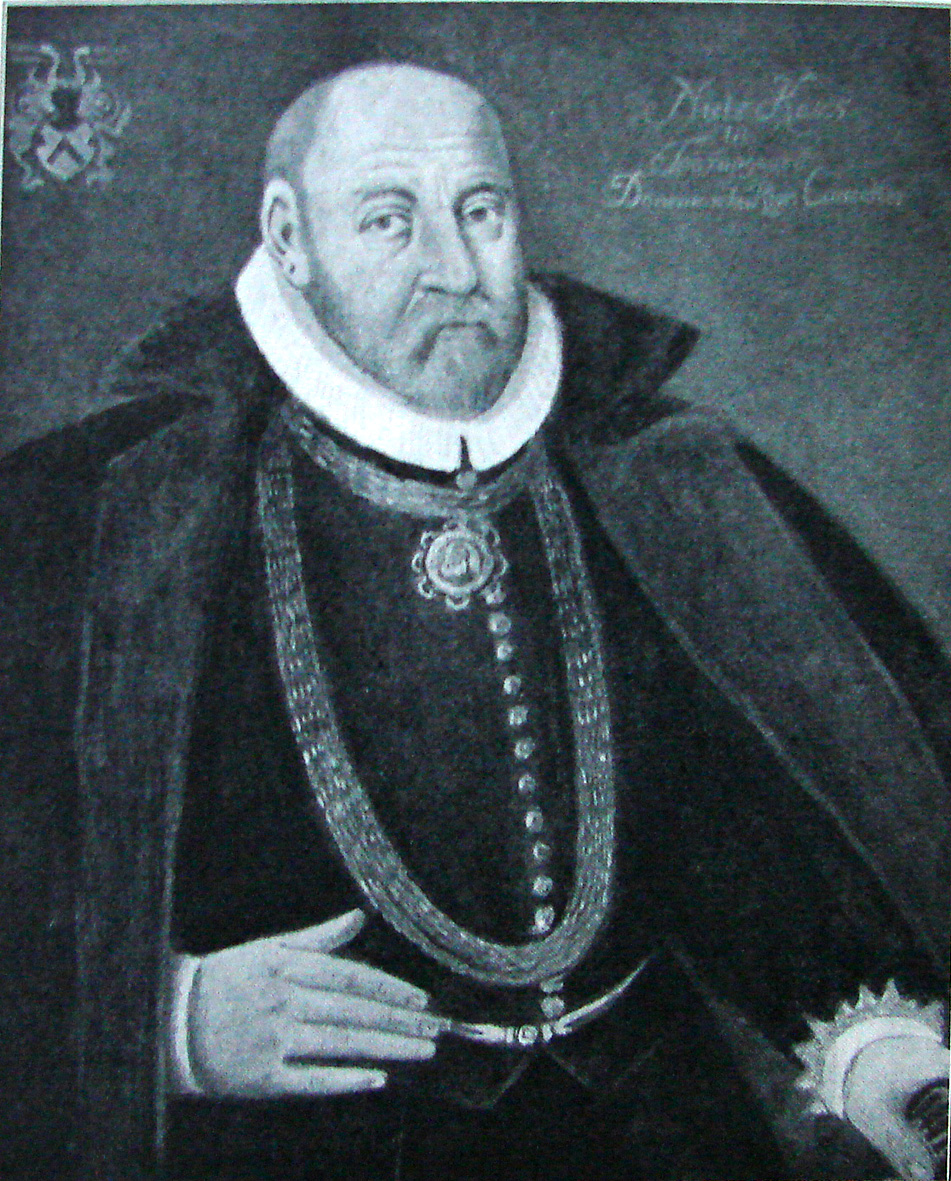
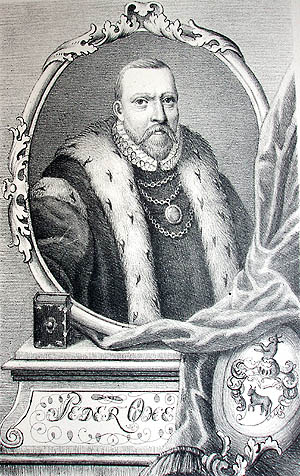
From left to right: chancellor Johan Friis, his secretary Niels Kaas (who later became chancellor himself), hofmester Peder Oxe (Rosenkrantz and Bilde not shown)

The Swedish delegation in Roskilde consented to all Danish and Lübeck demands. The Dano-Swedish treaty thus included the restoration of the pre-war borders between the kingdoms, except for the Swedish dominion in Estonia, established in 1561 during the Livonian War, which was to be ceded to Magnus of Holstein, brother of the Danish king. Furthermore, the Swedish crown was obliged to pay for the Danish war costs from 1563 to 1568. The draft was signed on 18 November 1568 by the Swedish envoys Jören Ericksson Gyllensterne (Jörgen Gyldenstiern of Fouglevig), Ture Bielke (Thure Bielcke of Salestad) and Niels Jensson (secretary), and for the Danish side by Peer Oxsse (Per or Peder Oxe of Gisselfeld, hofmester), Johan Friis (Frijs of Hesselagger, chancellor), Holger Rossenkrantzs (Holger Ottesen Rosenkrantz of Boller, governor in North Jutland), Peder Billde (Bilde of Svanholm, commander of Callundborg) and Nils Kaass (Kaas of Taarupgaard, secretary).

In the treaty between Lübeck and Sweden, the latter confirmed Lübeck's privileges as of 1523, (Note: In 1523, Lübeck was an ally of Sweden in the war against Denmark."WHKMLA : Swedish War of Liberation, 1521–1523". www.zum.de.) and restored peace between the parties. The draft was signed on 22 November 1568 by the same Swedish and Danish envoys who signed the Dano-Swedish agreement, and in addition, by Christoffer Thode (Christoph Tode), Calixtus Schein and Frederijck Kuevell for Lübeck as well as by Caspar Paselick, who signed for Denmark.

By accepting the Danish terms, the members of the Swedish delegation had exceeded their competence, and John (III) refused to ratify the treaties. John had his refusal backed up by a declaration from a Riksdag of the Estates summoned in Stockholm, stating that Frederick II was to receive "powder, lead and pikes" instead of war reparations.

Likewise, Frederick II summoned a Danish riksdag, the only one summoned between 1536 and 1627, in January 1570. By threatening to abdicate, Frederick II secured the riksdag's and the Danish Council's consent to new taxes, which were to finance the planned decisive blow on Sweden in the year 1570. While this blow never materialised, a combined fleet of Danish and Lübeck vessels led by Per Munck had previously bombarded Reval (Tallinn), the principal city in Swedish Estonia, for eleven days in July 1569; In November of the same year, Danish land forces had re-captured Varberg Fortress from the Swedish defendants but lost their commanders Daniel Rantzau and Franz Brokenhuus during the siege.

Lübeck, in addition to war costs and losses amounting to more than 300,000 talers, lost much of her pre-war Swedish trade to other Hanseatic cities. On 13 December 1570, the parties finally settled for peace in the treaty of Stettin.

== Sources ==
=== Bibliography ===
- Bain, Robert Nisbet (2006) [1905]. Scandinavia: a Political History of Denmark, Norway and Sweden from 1513 to 1900. Boston: Adamant Media Corp. ISBN 9780543939005.
- Bes, Lennart; et al., eds. (2007). Baltic Connections. Archival Guide to the Maritime Relations of the Countries Around the Baltic Sea (including the Netherlands) 1450–1800 (in German). Vol. I: Denmark, Estonia, Finland, Germany. Leiden: Koninklijke Brill NV. ISBN 9780543939005.
- Crichton, Andrew; Wheaton, Henry (1838). Scandinavia, Ancient and Modern; Being a history of Denmark, Sweden, and Norway. Vol. 2 (2 ed.). Edinburgh: Oliver & Boyd. OCLC 1017006105.
- Frost, Robert I. (2000). The Northern Wars. War, State, and Society in Northeastern Europe, 1558–1721. Modern wars in perspective. Upper Saddle River, New Jersey: Pearson Education. ISBN 0-582-06429-5.
- Odhner, Clas Teodor (Theodor), ed. (1897). Meddelanden från Svenska Riksarkivet. Vol. 4. Stockholm: Kungl. Boktryckeriet. OCLC 49284794.
- Regesta diplomatica historiae danicae. Index chronologicus diplomatum et literarum, historiam danicam ab antiquissimis temporibus usque ad annum 1660. Vol. II.I. Copenhagen: Royal Danish Academy of Sciences and Letters (Kongelige Danske Videnskabernes Selskab). 1870. OCLC 921900352.
- Roberts, Michael (1968). The early Vasas. A history of Sweden 1523–1611. Cambridge University Press. ISBN 0-521-06930-0.
