= 1450s in Denmark =

Events from the 1450s in Denmark.

== Incumbents ==
- Monarch — King Christian I
- Steward of the Realm – Otte Nielsen Rosenkrantz (1445–52), Niels Eriksen Gyldenstjerne (1453–56), Erik Ottesen Rosenkrantz (1456–1480)

== Events ==
1450

- 13 May – Christian I of Denmark becomes King of Norway
- 29 August – The Treaty of Bergen is signed in Bergen.

1451

- Brønshøj Church is expanded with a tower.

1454

- The Royal Brewery on Slotsholmen is mentioned for the first time.
- The town of Billund ("Byllundt") is mentioned for the first time.

1455

- June – Denmark enters the Thirteen Years' War when Christian I declares war against Poland and the Prussian Confederation. This means nothing more than a disturbance in trade, however, since Denmark is still busy fighting with Sweden.
- 14 September – Christian I confirms Copenhagen's old privileges and orders a refurbishment of its fortifications.

1456

- Christian I reassumes the title of Duke of Estonia in spite of the fact that Danish Estonia was sold in 1446.
- The Battle of Bornholm (1456) takes place near the Danish island of Bornholm, between privateers from the city of Gdańsk (Danzig) and a transport convoy of Danish and Livonian ships which were attempting to bring supplies and reinforcements to the Teutonic Knights in Prussia.

1457

- 23 June – Christian I of Denmark becomes King of Sweden

== Births ==
1452

- Date unknown – Johan Jepsen Ravensberg, clergy ad statesman (died 1512)

1455

- 2 February – Hans, King of Denmark (died 1513)

1456

- 23 June – Margaret of Denmark, Queen of Scotland (died 1486)

== Deaths ==
1459

- c. June – Eric VII, King of Denmark, Norway and Sweden, deposed in 1439 (born c. 1381)
- 4 December – Adolphus VIII, Count of Holstein (born 1401)
