= 1500s in Denmark =

Events from the 1500s in Denmark.

== Incumbents ==
- Monarch — King John
- Steward of the Realm — Poul Laxmand, until 1502

== Events ==
1500

- 17 February – The Danish troops are defeated in the Battle of Hemmingstedt.

1502

- Tyge Krabbe succeeds Eskil Gøye as Marshal of the Realm

== Births ==
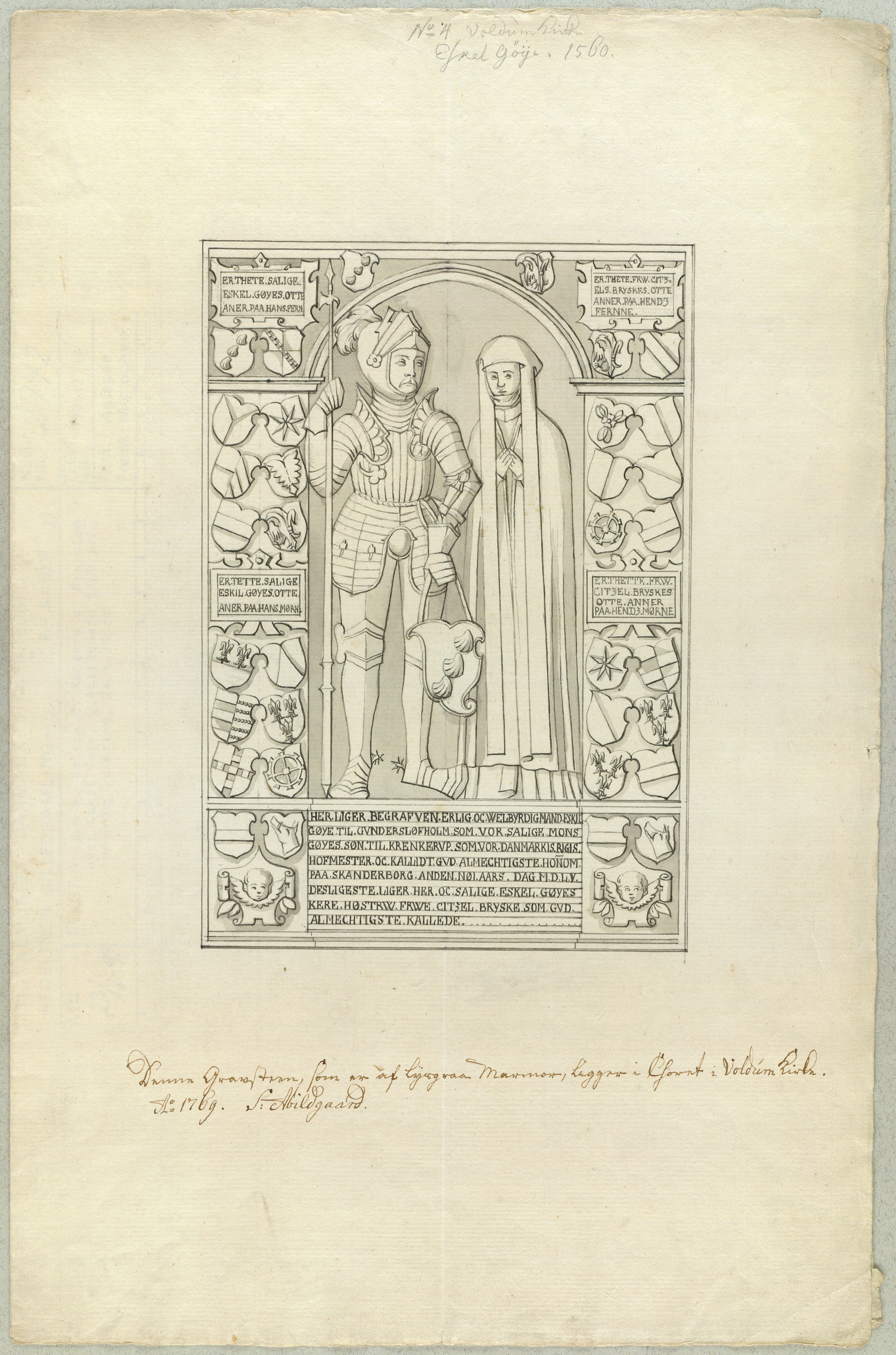
The ledgerstone of Eskul Gøye. Drawing by Søren Abildgaard, 1769.

- August 12 1503 – Christian III, King of Denmark and Norway (died 1559)
- 1503 – Hans Svaning, historian (died 1584)
- 1503 – Peder Palladius, bishop (died 1560)
- 1 August 1504 – Dorothea of Denmark, Duchess of Prussia (died 1547 in Germany)

== Deaths ==
1506

- 20 April – Eskil Gøye, Marshal of the Realm and landowner
