= 1490s in Denmark =

Events from the 1490s in Denmark.

== Incumbents ==
- Monarch — King John
- Steward of the Realm — Poul Laxmand

== Events ==
1492

- Faxe Church is constructed on the foundation of an older church.

1497

- St. Clare's Priory is founded by King John I and Queen Christina with a gift of the former royal vegetable gardens in Copenhagen.

== Births ==
- 12 November 1492 – Johan Rantzau, general and statesman (died 1565)
- 15 July 1497 – Francis of Denmark, son of John of Denmark (died 1511)

Undated

- Jørgen Sadolin (c. 1490), Lutheran reformer (died 1559)
- Peder Skram (c. 1497), naval admiral (died 1581)

== Deaths ==
- 10 November 1495 – Dorothea of Brandenburg, Queen consort of Denmark (born c. 1430 in Brandenburg)

Undated

- After 10 August 1492 — Evert Grubbe, Chancellor of the Realm
