= 1580s in Denmark =

Events from the 1580s in Denmark.

== Incumbents ==
- Monarch – Frederick II (until 1588), Christian IV

== Events ==
1580

- 3 February – A great fire destroys a large part of Ribe. 11 streets and 213 houses burn down.

1581

- The Kronborg Tapestries are commissioned. They are completed in 1596.

1588

- The Dutch architect Philip Brandin oversees the construction of a new Nykøbing Castle.

== Births ==
1580

- 8 January – Jens Hermansson Juel, Governor-general of Norway (died 1634)
- 8 April – Augusta of Denmark, princess of Denmark and Duchess of Holstein-Gottorp (died 1639)

1581

- 5 August – Hedwig of Denmark, princess of Denmark and Electress of Saxony (died 1641 in Saxony)
- 4 November – Christen Friis, nobleman (died 1639)
- 26 November – Frederick, Duke of Schleswig-Holstein-Sønderburg-Norburg (died 1658)

1583

- 2 January – Falk Lykke, nobleman (died 1650)
- 24 February – Margaret of Schleswig-Holstein-Sonderburg, Countess Consort of Nassau-Siegen (died 1658 in Siegen)
- 9 July – John, Prince of Schleswig-Holstein, prince of Denmark (died 1602)

1584

- 15 March – Philip, Duke of Schleswig-Holstein-Sonderburg-Glücksburg (died 1663)

1585

- 12 February – Caspar Bartholin the Elder, polymath (died 1629)
- 5 August – Jesper Brochmand, theologian and Bishop of Zealand (died 1652)
- 14 October – Lisbet Bryske, author and landowner (died 1674)
- Undated – Lorenz van Steenwinckel, architect (died 1619)

1587

- 2 January – Anders Arrebo, poet and bishop of Trondhjem (died 1637)
- 24 June – Hans van Steenwinckel the Younger, architect (died 1639)

1588

- 13 May – Ole Worm, physician and antiquary (died 1655)

Undated

- Mogens Pedersøn (c. 1583) – instrumentalist and composer (died 1623)
- Esaias Fleischer (c. 1586) – pharmacist (died 1663)

== Deaths ==
1580

- 1 October – John the Elder, prince of Denmark and Duke of Schleswig-Holstein-Haderslev (born 1521)

1581

- 11 July – Peder Skram, naval admiral (born c. 1497)

1583

- 26 December – Jørgen Lykke, nobleman (born 1515)

1584

- 23 April – Christoffer Gøye, nobleman and landowner (born c. 1514)
- 20 September – Hans Svaning, historian (born 1503)

1585

- 20 November – Eiler Grubbe, statesman and landholder(born 1532)

1586

- 20 March – Elisabeth of Brunswick-Grubenhagen, duchess of Schleswig-Holstein-Sonderburg (born 1550 in Brunswick-Lüneburg)
- 1 October – Adolf, Duke of Holstein-Gottorp, Prince of Denmark (born 1526)
- 15 October – Elizabeth of Denmark, princess of Denmark and a Duchess of Mecklenburg (born 1524)

1587

- 2 November – Hans Knieper, Flemish court artist

1588

- 4 April – Frederick II, King of Denmark and Norway (born 1534)

1589

- 18 January – Magnus Heinason, Faroese sailor and privateer (born 1548)
- 15 February – Anne Hardenberg, courtier and lady-in-waiting (born c. 1539)

Undated

- Melchior Lorck (c. 1583) – painter and printmaker (born c. 1526)
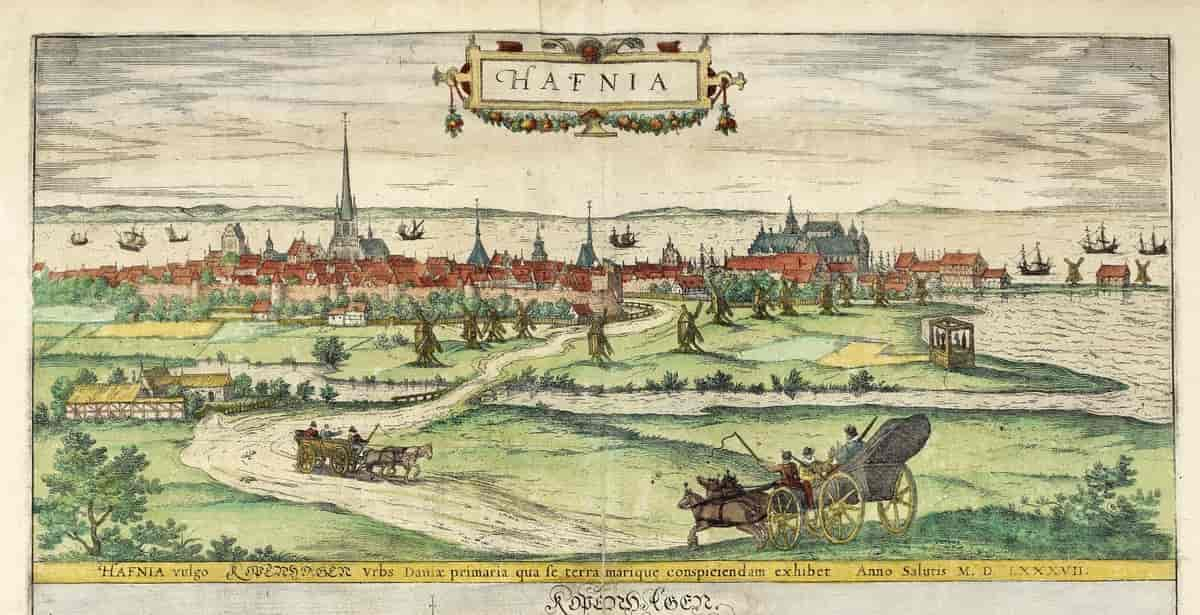
View of Copenhagen from Vesterbro, 1587-
