= Esaias Fleischer =

Esaias Fleischer may refer to:

- Esaias Fleischer (priest) (1633–1697), Danish priest
- Esaias Fleischer (pharmacist) (c. 1586–1663), Danish pharmacist
