= 1400s in Denmark =

Events from the 1400s in Denmark.

== Incumbents ==
- Monarch – Eric of Pomerania

== Events ==
1400

- Jens Due becomes Steward of the Realm.

1403

Præstø is incorporated as a market town.

1409

- 7 December – Nysted is incorporated as a market town.

== See also ==
- 1300s in Denmark
