= 1510s in Denmark =

Events from the 1510s in Denmark.

== Incumbents ==
- Monarch – John (until 20 February 1513), Christian II
- Steward of the Realm – Niels Eriksen Rosenkrantz (1513–1515)

== Events ==
1510

- 10 August – Establishment of the Dano-Norwegian navy.

1512

- 23 April – the Treaty of Malmö is signed, ending the Dano-Swedish War of 1501–1512.

1514

- 11 June – Coronation of King Christian II.

== Births ==
1511

- Birgitte Gøye, county administrator, lady in waiting, landholder and noble (died 1574)

1513

- Niels Hemmingsen, Lutheran theologian (died 1600)

1515

- Jørgen Lykke, nobleman and politician (died 1583)
- Jørgen Thygesen Brahe, nobleman (died 1565)

1517

- Trials and execution of Torben Oxe.

1518

- 21 February – John of Denmark, eldest child of Christian II and Isabella of Austria (died 1532 in Germany)

== Deaths ==
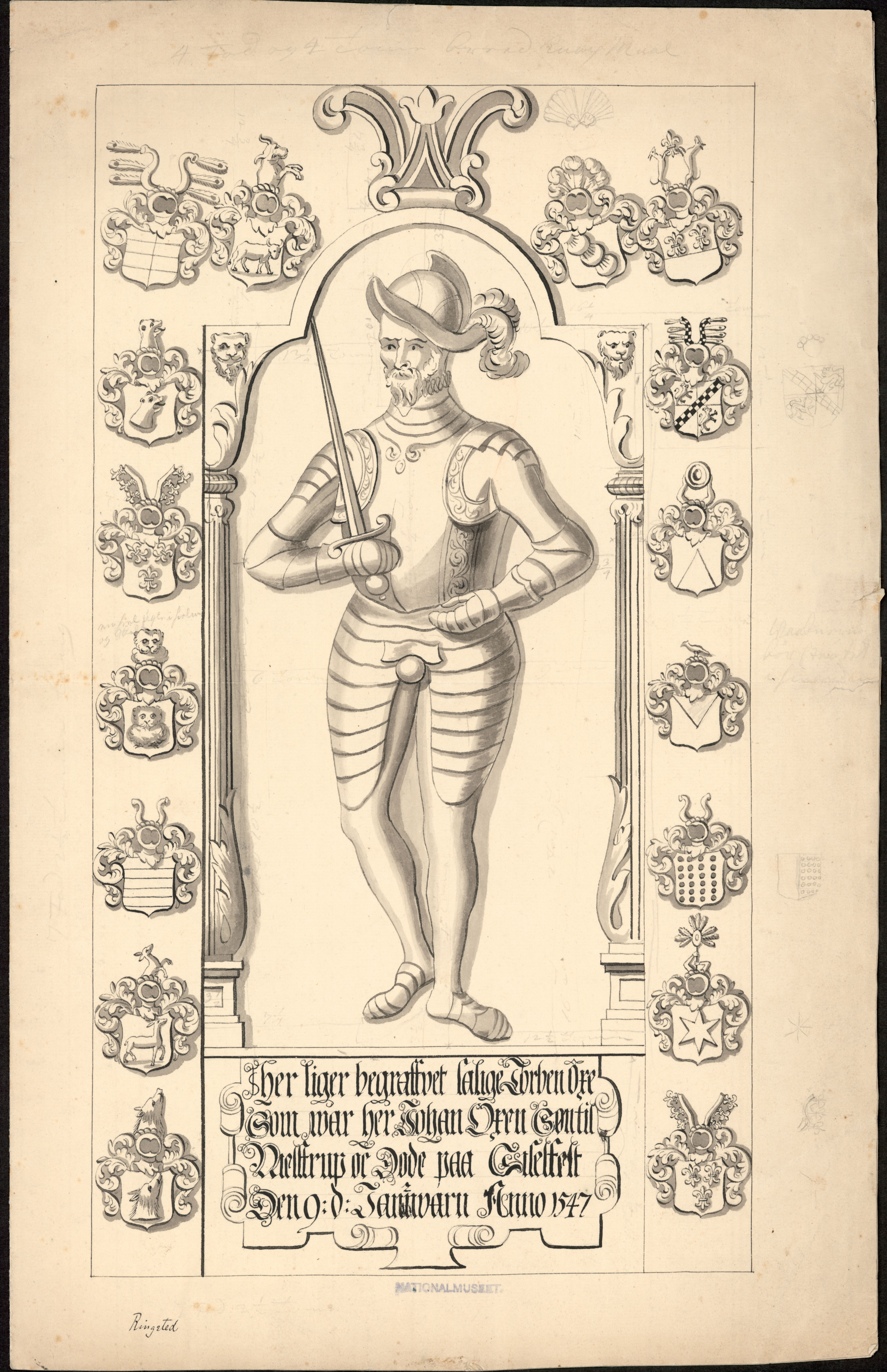
The ledgerstone of Torben Oxe in St. Bendt's Church, Ringsted..

1511

- 1 April – Francis of Denmark, youngest son of King John of Denmark and Christina of Saxony (born 1497)

1512

- 14 April – Johan Jepsen Ravensberg, clergy ad statesman (born 1452)
- Date unknown – Edele Jernskjæg, royal mistress of King John I of Denmark.

1513

- 20 February – John, King of Denmark (born 1455)

1517

- 21 September – Dyveke Sigbritsdatter, royal mistress (born 1490)
- 29 November – Torben Oxe, noble, landowner
