= 1622 in Denmark =

- Decades: 1600s; 1610s; 1620s; 1630s; 1640s
- See also: Other events of 1622; List of years in Denmark

Events from the year 1622 in Denmark.

== Incumbents ==
- Monarch – Christian IV
- Steward of the Realm

== Events ==
Undated

- Christian IV invites Jews to settle in Denmark.
- Christian IV establishes a new deer park at present-day Charlottenlund Palace, which was to replace Rosenborg Deer Park at Rosenborg Castle just outside Copenhagen.
- The Matthias Hansen House on Amagertorv in Copenhagen is built.
- The Neptune Fountain is installed in the forecourt of Frederiksborg Castle.

== Births ==
=== Full date missing ===
- Valdemar Christian of Schleswig-Holstein, son of Christian IV (died 1656)

== Deaths ==
=== Full date missing ===
- Christoffer Dybvad, mathematician (born 1578)

== Publications ==
- Christen Sørensen Longomontanus: Astronomia Danica, etc. (1622)
- Christen Sørensen Longomontanus: Astronomia Danica (in Latin). Amsterdam: Willem Jansz Blaeu. 1622.
- Christen Sørensen Longomontanus: Disputationes quatuor Astrologicae (1622)
