= 1623 in Denmark =

- Decades: 1600s; 1610s; 1620s; 1630s; 1640s
- See also: Other events of 1623; List of years in Denmark

Events from the year 1623 in Denmark.

== Incumbents ==
- Monarch – Christian IV

== Events ==
=== Undated ===
- Frederick III, then Prince Frederick, becomes administrator of the Prince-Bishopric of Verden, a title which he held until being expelled by the Catholic League in 1629, and then regained from 1635 to 1645.
- Ladegården is established by Christian IV.

== Births ==
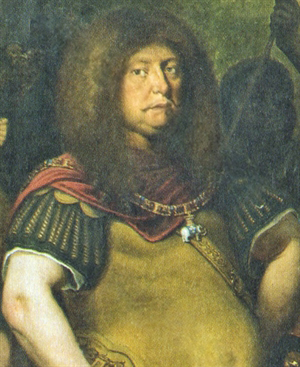
Holger Vind.

- 31 May – Holger Vind, statesman (died 1683)
- 28 August – Steen Ottesen Brahe, military officer and landowner (died 1677)
- 28 December – Elisabeth Augusta Lindenov, daughter of king Christian IV of Denmark and Kirsten Munk (died 1677)

=== Undated ===
- Frederik Ahlefeldt, statesman and Grand Chancellor (died 1686)
- Lucas Debes, priest and author (died 1675 in the Faroe Islands)
- Lucas Debes, clergy (died 1675)

== Deaths ==
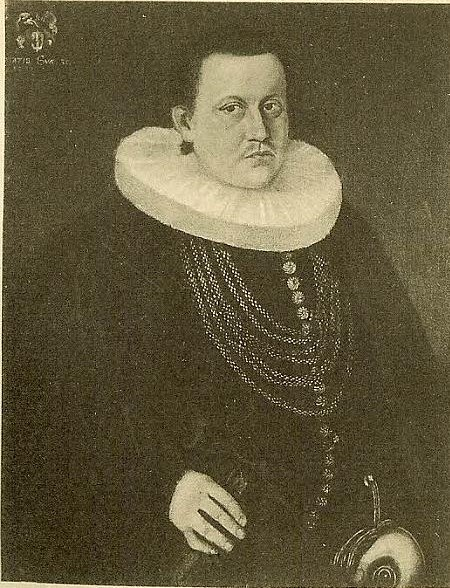
Sivert Beck.

- 2 January – Sivert Beck, landowner and treasurer (born 1566)

=== Undated ===
- Mogens Pedersøn, musician and composer (born c. 1583)
- Peder Munk, ambassador and navigator (born 1534)
