= 1624 in Denmark =

- Decades: 1600s; 1610s; 1620s; 1630s; 1640s
- See also: Other events of 1624; List of years in Denmark

Events from the year 1624 in Denmark.

== Incumbents ==
- Monarch – Christian IV
- Steward of the Realm;

== Events ==
- February 28 – A decree made it explicitly illegal for Jesuits and monks to appear in the country.
- December 24 – Royal Danish Mail is founded.

=== Undated ===
- The market hall Børsen opens in Copenhagen.

== Deaths ==
- 7 February – Cort Aslakssøn, astronomer, theologist and (born 1564)
