= Siege of Varberg =

- Part of Northern Seven Years' War
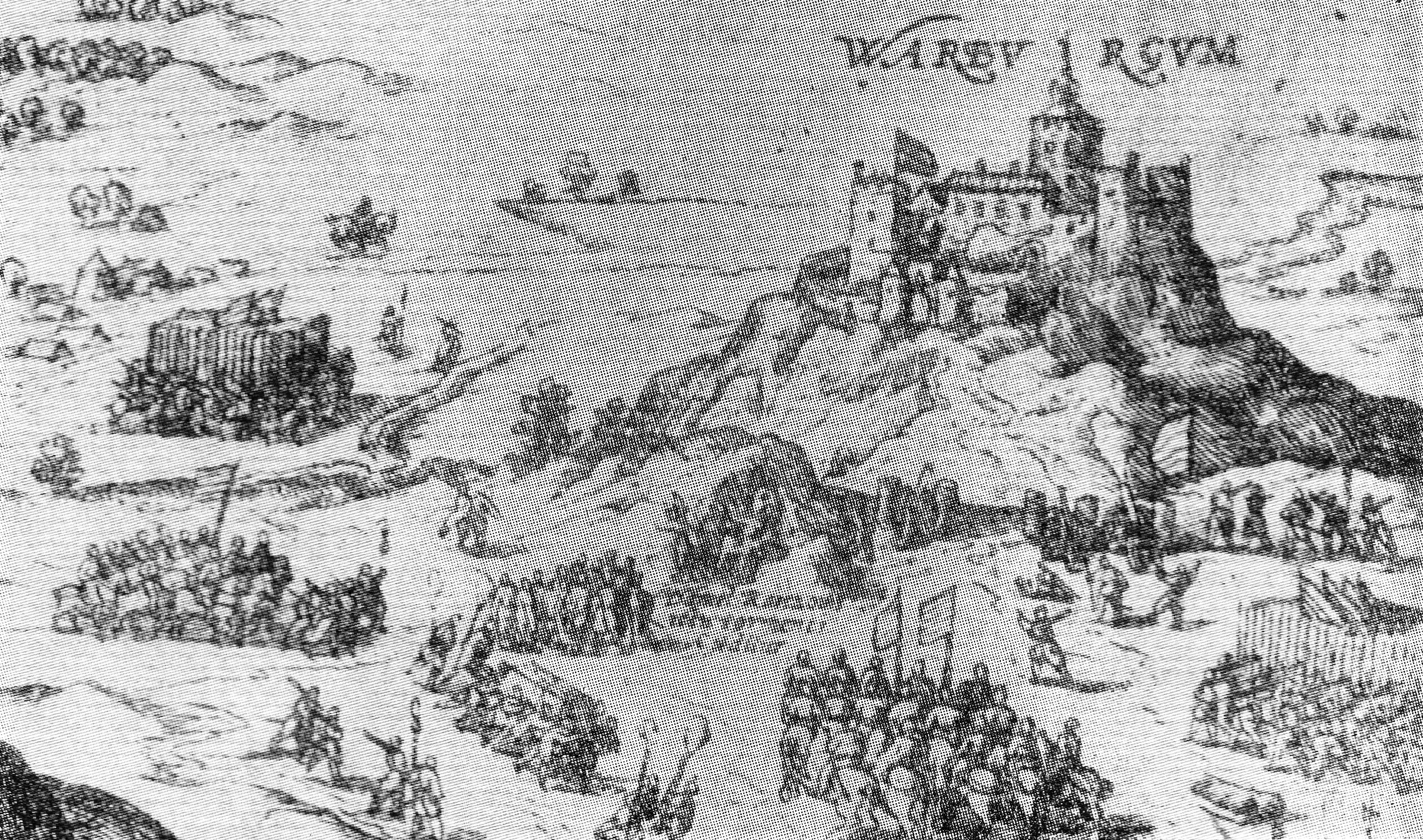
- Danish siege of Swedish-held Varberg Fortress, November 1569
Date	November 1569
Location	Varberg, Halland, Denmark-Norway (present-day Sweden) 57°06′21″N 12°14′24″E
Result	Danish victory

Belligerents
Sweden	Denmark–Norway

Commanders and leaders
(Sweden) Bo Birgersson Grip †	(Denmark–Norway) Daniel Rantzau † (Denmark–Norway) Franz Brockenhuus †

Casualties and losses
Unknown	Unknown

The siege of Varberg was a Danish siege of the Swedish-occupied Varberg Fortress in Halland, Denmark, present-day Sweden, by Danish forces under the Danish-German general Daniel Rantzau. Rantzau was killed by a Swedish cannonball on 11 November. Danish commander Franz Brockenhuus and Swedish commander Bo Birgersson Grip were also killed in the battle.

== Background ==
After Swedish king Eric XIV was deposed in 1568, his brother became king as John III. John sent a delegation to Denmark to negotiate for an end of the Northern Seven Years' War. Frederik II of Denmark was unable to exploit the inner-Swedish conflict, as his treasures were emptied by the costs of his German mercenary armies, on whom he had relied throughout the war, and the rebuilding of the Danish navy. The Swedish delegation in Roskilde consented to all Danish demands. The Dano-Swedish treaty thus included the restoration of the pre-war borders between the kingdoms, except for the Swedish dominion in Estonia, established in 1561 during the Livonian War, which was to be ceded to Frederick's brother, Magnus of Holstein. Furthermore, the Swedish crown was obliged to pay for the Danish war costs from 1563 to 1568. The draft was signed on 18 November 1568 by the Swedish envoys Jören Ericksson Gyllensterne (Jörgen Gyldenstiern of Fouglevig), Ture Bielke (Thure Bielcke of Salestad) and Niels Jensson (secretary), and for the Danish side by Peer Oxsse (Per or Peder Oxe of Gisselfeld, hofmester), Johan Friis (Frijs of Hesselagger, chancellor), Holger Rossenkrantzs (Holger Ottesen Rosenkrantz of Boller, governor in North Jutland), Peder Billde (Bilde of Svanholm, commander of Callundborg) and Nils Kaass (Kaas of Taarupgaard, secretary).

== Bibliography ==
- Frost, Robert I. (2000). The Northern Wars. War, State, and Society in Northeastern Europe, 1558–1721. Modern wars in perspective. Upper Saddle River, New Jersey: Pearson Education. ISBN 0-582-06429-5.
- Odhner, Clas Teodor (Theodor), ed. (1897). Meddelanden från Svenska Riksarkivet. Vol. 4. Stockholm: Kungl. Boktryckeriet.
- Roberts, Michael (1968). The early Vasas. A history of Sweden 1523-1611. Cambridge University Press. ISBN 0-521-06930-0.
