= Niels Kaas =

Danish politician

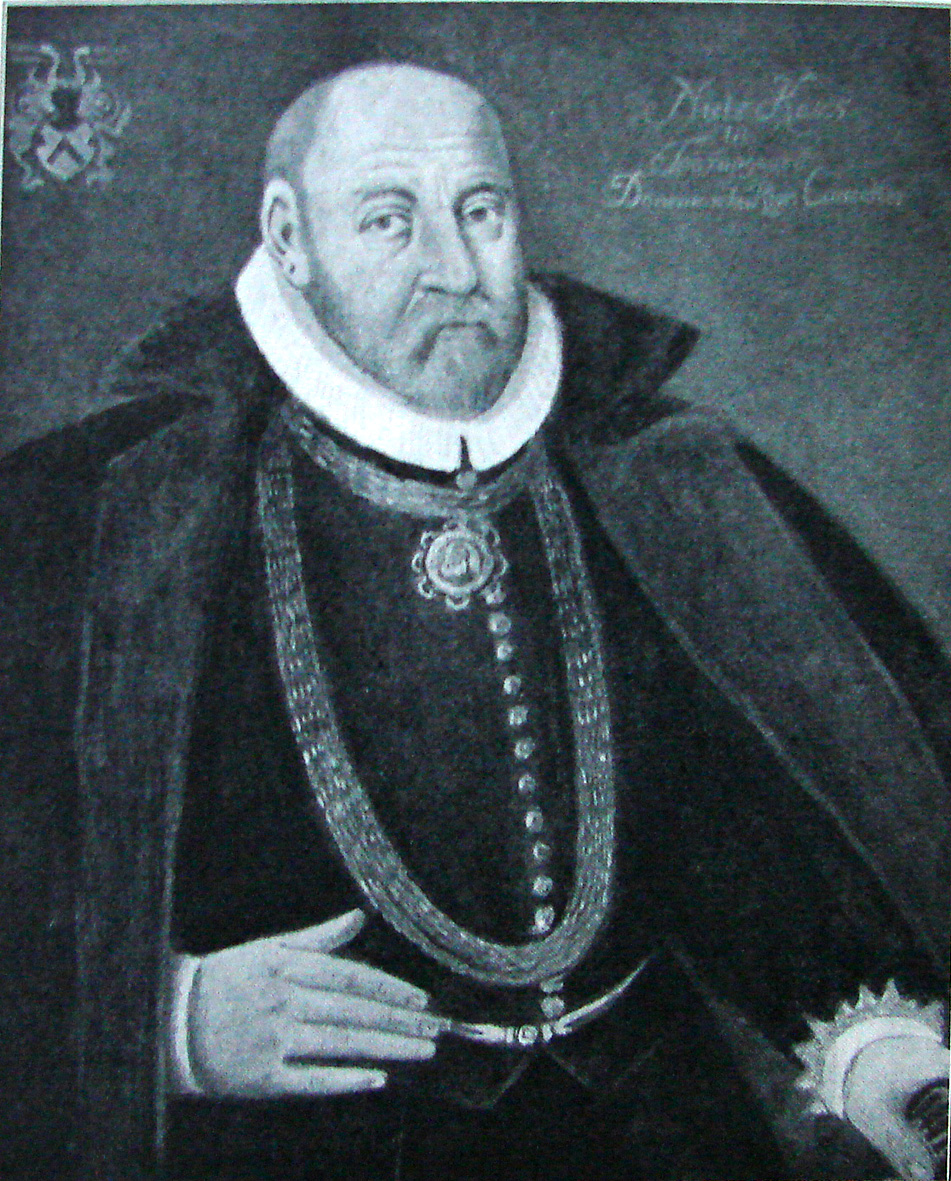

Chancellor of Denmark
- In office 1573–1594
- Monarchs: Frederick II; Christian IV
- Preceded by: Johan Friis

Personal details
- Born: 1535 Stårupgård, Viborg Municipality, Denmark
- Died: 29 June 1594 (aged 59–60) Copenhagen, Denmark–Norway
- Education: Viborg School

Niels Kaas (1535 – 29 June 1594) was a Danish politician who served as Chancellor of Denmark from 1573 until his death. He was influential in the negotiation of the Peace of Stettin and in the upbringing of Christian IV. Kaas also played an important role in the emancipation of Schleswig-Holstein.

== Early life and education ==
Kaas belonged to a noble family. His parents were Niels, who died seven months before he was born, and Anne Bjørn, who died when he was five. As a result, Kaas was raised by his uncle Mogens Kaas, the dean of the district of Jelling, and later cantor of Ribe Chapel. He was educated at the Viborg school, where he studied for nine years, concentrating on theology and classical studies. In 1549, Kaas moved to Copenhagen, where he was taken in by theologian Niels Hemmingsen under the direction of his brother Bjørn. Under Hemmingsen, he completed his theological, Latin, and historical training. In 1554, Kaas began studying under Philipp Melanchthon in Wittenberg. He also studied in Frankfurt and Leuven, and saw the Battle of St. Quentin in 1557.

== Career ==
Kaas returned to Copenhagen in 1557, entering the Danish Chancery three years later. His knowledge of history and Latin became invaluable in negotiations with other countries. During the Northern Seven Years' War, Kaas remained in Copenhagen and helped negotiate with Sweden in Roskilde. In 1570, he helped complete the Peace of Stettin.

After the death of Chancellor Johan Friis in December 1570, Kaas was appointed Chancellor by the Herredag (lords of the realm) in May 1573. In 1575, he became the second-most powerful person in the country on the death of the Steward of the Realm, Peder Oxe. Frederick II greatly relied on Kaas's negotiating skills. As chancellor, Kaas helped solve the question of succession for John II, Duke of Schleswig-Holstein-Haderslev and John II, Duke of Schleswig-Holstein-Sonderburg in 1582. In August 1582, Kaas was involved in the reception of the English ambassador Peregrine Bertie, 13th Baron Willoughby de Eresby at Kronborg.

He also served as the Chancellor of the University of Copenhagen, and under his leadership the university created its first professorship in history. Many of his writings survive from this time. He took special interest in the research of astronomy under Tycho Brahe, and of history in general.

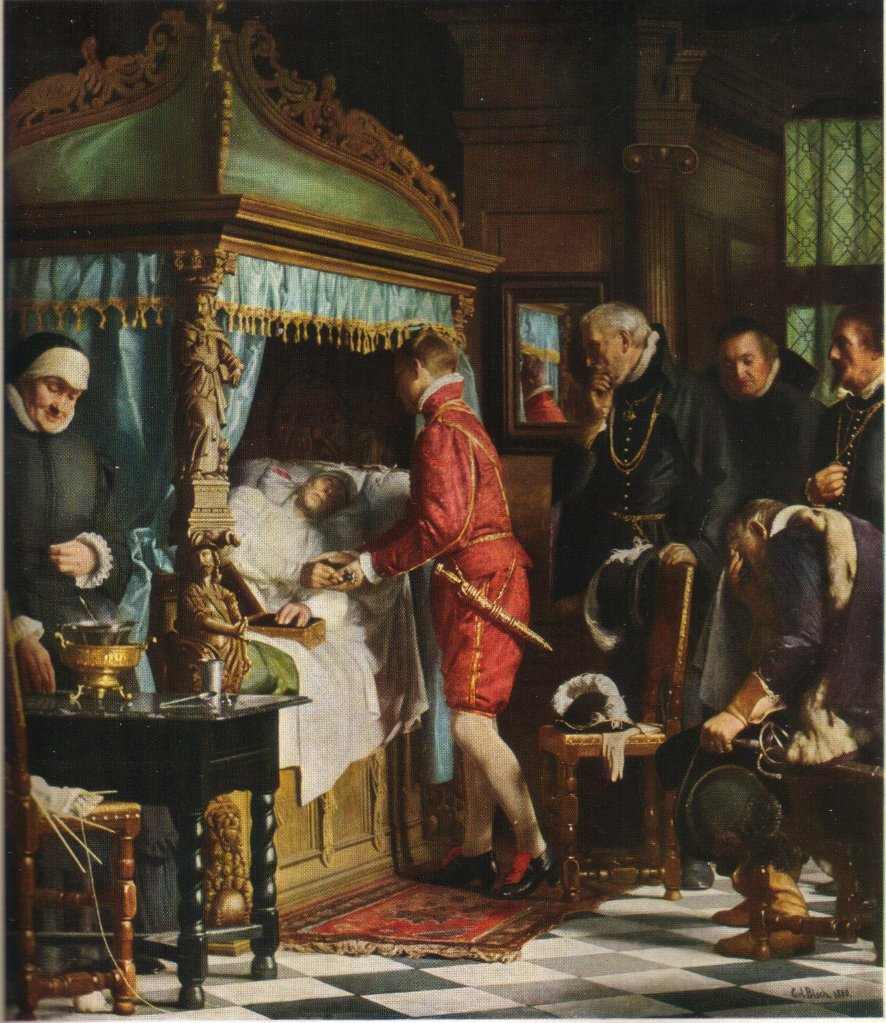
Christian IV receiving the keys of government from Kaas

In June 1587 when Frederick II had toothache, Kaas met the Scottish ambassadors Patrick Vans and Peter Young who wanted to discuss the marriage of James VI to a Danish princess. Upon the death of Frederick II in 1588, Kaas became the guardian of government. During this time, he dealt with many issues, such as the influence wielded by the dowager queen Sophia and her father Duke Ulrich III of Mecklenburg-Güstrow. Kaas was a supporter of the two, but the Folketing opposed their influence and sought to limit it.

James VI married Anne of Denmark and came to Denmark in 1589 and gave Kaas a gold chain worth 900 dalers. On 12 December 1591 he signed the autograph book of Dietrich Bevernest, writing, "Fortuna fugacior undis."

In 1593, Kaas helped emancipate the duchies of Schleswig-Holstein from the Holy Roman Empire and secure the rule over them of Frederick's successor, Christian IV. On his deathbed in 1594, Kaas called Christian IV in order to advise him on government, saying:

Your grace Lord Father, holy remembrance, I promised to his utmost, that I with all power, counsel and faithfulness should ensure that the crown came upon your head. But now prevents death me therein upon the will of God, yet I will do what I can, and provide therefore the honor of your Grace's own hands the key to the vault, where the crown, scepter, sword and orb since his death, having been bestowed. Take therefore the kingdom treasures of God himself, bears the crown with Price and glory reigns spire with wisdom and grace, bring the sword of justice and power and keeps the orb lay with counsel and prudence. God bless the king! Farewell king, farewell kingdoms and lands, father surely all the world! Come, O Jesus, if you will, now I die happy.

— Niels Kaas,

== Sources ==
- Leonard, Forster (1982). Das Album amicorum von Dietrich Bevernest (in German). North-Holland Publishing Company.
- Stevenson, David (1997). Scotland's Last Royal Wedding : The marriage of James VI and Anne of Denmark. John Donald. ISBN 0-85976-451-6. OCLC 36798423.
- Bricka, Carl Frederik (1895). "Niels Kaas". Dansk biografisk Lexikon, tillige omfattende Norge for tidsrummet 1537–1814 Danish Biographic Lexicon, including Norway for the period 1537–1814 (in Danish). Vol. IX (1st ed.). pp. 65–71.
- Kerr-Peterson, Miles; Pearce, Michael (2020). "James VI's English Subsidy and Danish Dowry Accounts". Miscellany of the Scottish History Society. Vol. XVI. Boydell Press. ISBN 978-0-906245-45-3. OCLC 1122799160.
