= Battle of Brobacka =

1566 Swedish-Danish battle

- Part of Northern Seven Years' War
Date	9 August 1566
Location	Alingsås, Sweden 57°55′48″N 12°31′59″E
Result	Swedish victory

Belligerents
Sweden	Denmark–Norway

Commanders and leaders
Charles de Mornay	Daniel Rantzau

Strength
3,700 men	7,500 men

Casualties and losses
550	2,500

The Battle of Brobacka was fought in Alingsås between Sweden and Denmark on 9 August 1566. The Swedish army under command of Charles de Mornay successfully managed to ambush Daniel Rantzau and his Danish army on their arrival back from their looting train in Västergötland, southwest of Sweden.

== Prelude ==
During the mid-1560s, an army of 8,000 men and 600 cavalry under Daniel Rantzau had continuously plundered and looted the Swedish southwest coast of Västergötland and burnt several towns; for instance, Bogesund, Falköping, Skara, and Lidköping were destroyed. However, after repeated raids, diseases as well as subsequent threats from a nearby Swedish army under command of Charles de Mornay, the Danes were forced to retreat back to Denmark. Charles de Mornay was ordered to encounter the Danes with his army stationed in Värnamo. Some skirmishes occurred, one of them at Tråvads bridge where the Danes suffered some heavy casualties.

Charles de Mornay later received orders from the Swedish king Erik XIV to gather the Allmoge (farmers from the agrarian society) in Småland to obtain and build blocking defences in order to halt the Danish retreat. In that way, Erik's force would maybe make it to capture them. Preparations were made and trees, stones, and other wooden material were felled or built across the roads.

The Danish army which was retreating to Alingsås church, realized the risk of the march with the nearby Swedish army of 3,880 infantry and 1,450 cavalry under de Mornay, thus chose to go through Brobacka, meanwhile suffering losses due to sickness and starvation.

== Battle ==
In the eve of 9 August Swedish scouts confirmed possible Danish cavalry arriving in Fjällsjön. The bridge going over the strait had been destroyed by the Swedish defenders at Brobacka consisting of 3,700 mobilized peasants. While Rantzau on his arrival noticed this, he immediately was fired at by the peasants. The Danish soldiers returned an effective fire but chose not to stay, believing the Swedish army to have been superior. Rantzau then started his crossing of the strait to Östad, however, only one cannon or reiter at a time could cross, creating a vulnerable position for the Danes.

The Danish army's access across the strait shocked Rantzau who questioned the Swedes reasons not to attack. However, Charles de Mornay had orders to attack the baggage train and not the main bulk of the Danish army. When it arrived the Swedish cavalry and infantry stormed down from the cliffs north of the road. A riot amongst the Danes occurred and they suffered 900 killed in just half an hour as well as 300 wagons and 600 horses of the stationary wagon train. The Swedes took all of the booty and disappeared as quickly as they came. On believing they faced the whole Swedish army, the Danish rear guard exploited the riot, despite facing numerically disadvantaged Swedes looting the train, and in disorder they fled against Starrkärr and Nödinge.

== Aftermath ==
The four Danish officers; Tomas Kruuse, Krister Scramm, Morten Krabbe, and Josef Muus August Zwertlein all died in the battle along with 2,500 other Danes. The whole wagon train had been abandoned and the Swedish victory had been total. Around 3,143 peasants were alive on 12 August which means about 550 had either been killed or mortally wounded in the battle. On 9 August 1986 a memorial stone was raised in Brobacka for those who fell on 9 August 1566.
