= 1621 in Denmark =

- Decades: 1600s; 1610s; 1620s; 1630s; 1640s
- See also: Other events of 1621; List of years in Denmark

Events from the year 1621 in Denmark.

== Incumbents ==
- Monarch – Christian IV

== Events ==
- Maribo Abbey closes, and its lands eventually become part of Sorø Academy

== Births ==
- 8 July – Leonora Christina Ulfeldt, daughter of Christian IV and Countess of Schleswig-Holstein (died 1698)

== Deaths ==
- 8 March – Enevold Kruse, nobleman who served as Governor-general of Norway (born 1554)
- 26 June – Christence Kruckow, noblewoman and accused witch (born c. 1558)
