= Lisbet Bryske =

Danish landowner and genealogist

- Born: 14 October 1585; Dallund, Denmark
- Died: 4 December 1674 (aged 89); Vejle, Denmark
- Spouses: Mogens Krabbe (m. 1605; died 1614) Henrik Bille (m. 1616; died 1655)

Lisbet Eilersdatter Bryske (14 October 1585 – 4 December 1674) was a Danish author and landowner. She was famous for her books on coats of arms and genealogy, which were consulted, referenced, and expanded by later genealogists of the Danish nobility. She also translated German religious literature, though this work was never published.

Bryske was widowed twice and had thirteen children. She owned several estates and created the eponymous Bryskesborg estate. It was there where she lived out the later part of her life and produced much of her work. At the time of her death, she was the last surviving member of the Bryske family and was survived by only four of her children.

== Early life ==
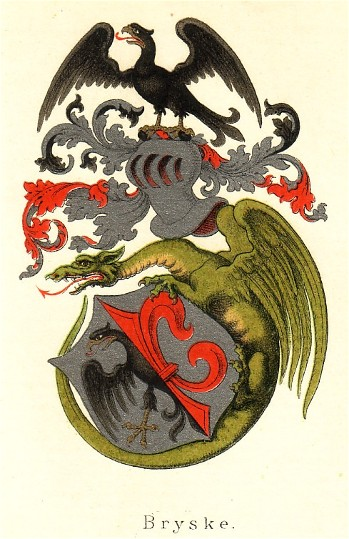
Coat of arms of the Bryske family by Anders Thiset from the 1889 Danmarks Adels Aarbog

Lisbet Bryske was born on 14 October 1585 at Dallund on Funen to Eiler Bryske (1541–1614) and Gertrud Iversdatter Lunge (1543–1614).

She grew up at Skerrildgaard manor, which was owned by her mother and later inherited by Bryske. Until the age of 6, she was educated through catechesis. As a child, she was taught to read and write by a tutor at the estate, alongside her brother, Iuer Bryske, and sister, Maren Bryske.

== Work ==
Bryske is best known for armorial and genealogical works. At least one of her armorial works, which detailed the coats of arms of noble families, had been hand illustrated by Bryske herself. Most of Bryske's books on genaelogy focus on two Danish noble families: the Lunges family and the Thotts family. Manuscripts of these works are preserved in the National Archives in Lund and the Karen Brahe Library. Inscriptions that she made in copies of these works suggest that she had plans to completely rewrite them before her death.

She also translated several works of German religious literature into Danish and claimed to have translated a religious text every Sunday and every holy day during the Northern War. A collection of sermons she had translated, known as Det gyldne Klenodie (lit. 'The Golden Treasure'), was prepared for publication but likely scrapped after a separate translation made it to market before hers.

In 1665, Bryske wrote an autobiography, through which much of what is known of her life survives. In it, she details her charitable work, the religious works she had translated, the loss she had known in her family, and her dedication to literary pursuits. She also took great pride in her ability to read and write without glasses, despite her advanced age. Because the autobiography was written in the third-person, it has been speculated that she prepared it for her own funeral sermon.

== Personal life ==
Bryske married landowner Mogens Krabbe (1576–1614) on 6 October 1605 in Odense. She was widowed for the first time when he died on 17 February 1614 in Copenhagen. She lost both of her parents in the same year as her husband's death. They had five children together: Anne (6 October 1606 – 25 September 1638), Niels (2 March 1608 – 8 October 1630), Lisbeth (9 January 1609 – 21 January 1645), Iver (13 October 1611 – 12 June 1662), and Birgitte (c.1605–1614 – after 1648).

She remarried on 28 August 1616, to landowner Henrik Bille at Stjernholm. Although Henrik came from the Bille noble family, comparatively little is known about his life. She was widowed once again when he died on 3 March 1655 at Tirsbæk, Engum parish. She and Bille established a hospital in Engum parish. After the hospital was destroyed in 1657 by Swedish forces during the Northern War, she paid for it to be rebuilt.

Henrik and Lisbet had eight children together: Mogens (13 June 1617 – 25 April 1648), Knud (after 1617–1623), Eiler (1622 – 21 September 1649), Vibeke (1624–1698), Gertrud (after 1624 – after 1651), Knud (25 January 1627 – 7 August 1684), Hilleborg (after 1627–1679), and Steen (7 February 1630 – 3 October 1686).

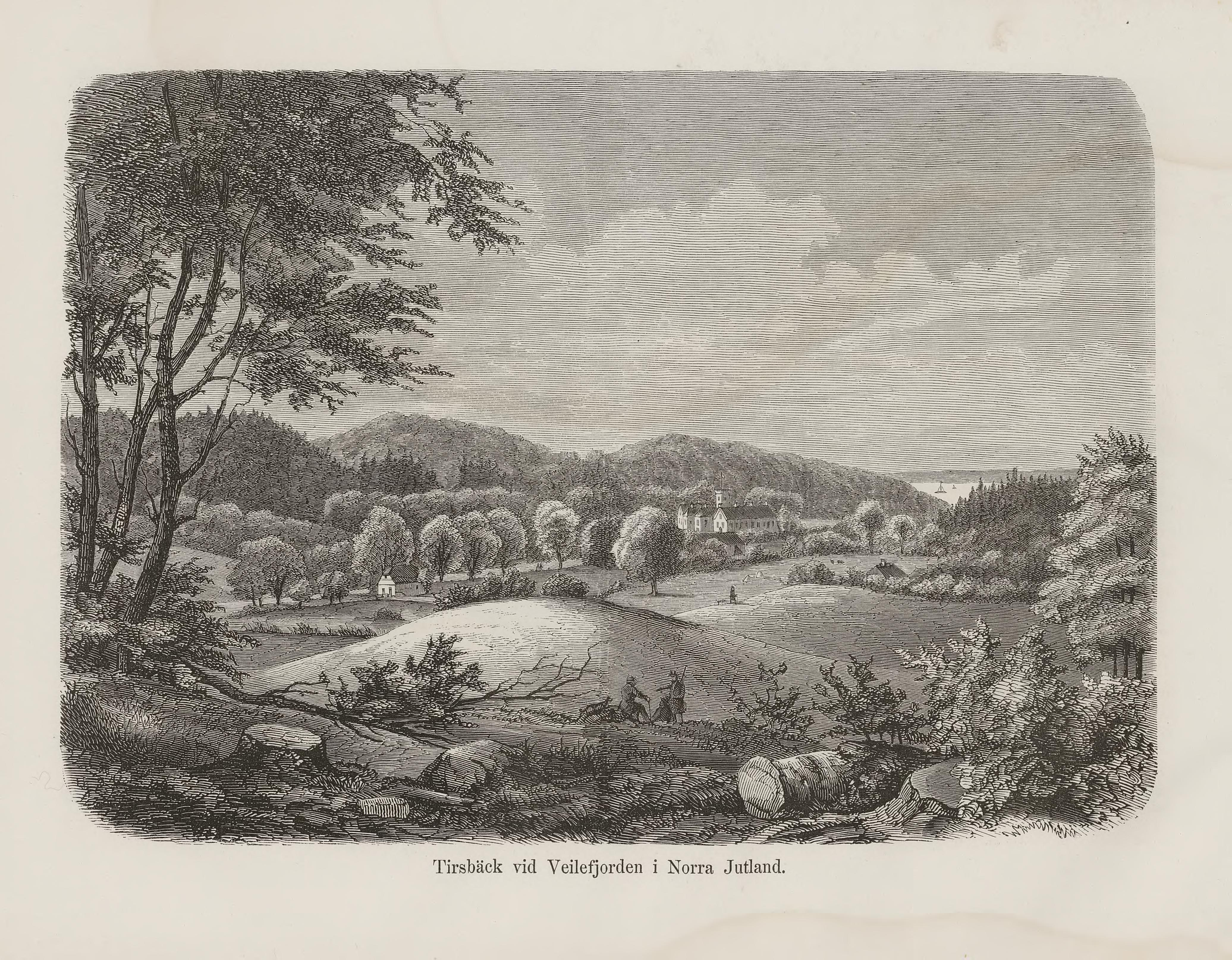
Illustration of Tirsborg by Albert Bonnier from 1868

Bryske owned several estates, having inherited Tirsbæk and Skerrildgård from her parents in 1614. After parts of Tirsbæk were destroyed during the Northern War of 1655–1660, she formed a new estate from the deserted lands. This estate was known as Bryskesborg until 1775 after its founder; today it is known as Williamsborg. After the death of her second husband, she spent the remainder of her life at Bryskesborg and Tirsbæk. She died in Vejle on 4 December 1674. She had outlived nine of her thirteen children and was the last surviving member of the Bryske family.
