= Gertrud Skomagers =

Gertrud Rasmus Skomagers (died 1556) was a Danish alleged witch. The case against her contributed to a change in the law regarding witch trials in Denmark.

Gertrud Skomagers was accused by Hans Ipsen in Rudkøbing of having harmed him and his property by use of magic. The charge was supported by 16 witnesses and the rumors circulating that she was a witch. Skomagers professed her innocence even during torture. She was found guilty as charged and sentenced to be burned. Skomagers was executed without having admitted her guilt.

The year after, her spouse filed a complaint before the monarch. His complaint was deemed as just, the trial was declared a mistrial and the witnesses of the trial were fined. The case of Gertrud Skomagers led to a new law, which banned local judges from executing anyone for sorcery before their verdicts had been confirmed by the High court.
