= 1300s in Denmark =

Denmark-related events during the 1300s

Events from the 1300s in Denmark.

== Incumbents ==
- Monarch – Eric VI of Denmark

== Events ==
1301

- Ebeltoft is incorporated as a market town.
- Slangerup is incorporated as a market town. (later recalled).

1302

- Randers is incorporated as a market town.

1306

- Sakskøbing is incorporated as a market town.

== Births ==
- c. 1307 – Eric Christoffersen of Denmark
- 1308 – Niels Ebbesen, squire (died 1340)

== Deaths ==
- 5 August 1300 – Johannes Krag, bishop
- 29 September 1304 – Agnes of Brandenburg, Queen of Denmark (born c. 1257=

=== Full date unknown ===
- 1304 – Erik, Duke of South Halland
- c. 1309 – Jacob Nielsen, Count of Halland
