= 1420s in Denmark =

Events from the 1420s in Denmark.

== Incumbents ==
- Monarch – Eric of Pomerania

== Events ==
1422

- Erik of Pommeria issues Den store Købstadsforordning which determines that all market towns are to be governed by two mayors.
- 15 February and 28 October – Eric of Pomerania grants the town of Copenhagen market rights.

1422

- Sound Dues are introduced at Helsingør.

1426

- 2 June – Helsingør is granted new and extended market rights.
- Undated – The Dano-Hanseatic War (1426–1435) breaks out.

1427

- 21 July – A fleet from the Hanseatic League has been sent out to attack Copenhagen as a reaction to the Sound Dues but is defeated by a Danish fleet in the Øresund.

1428

- 16 April – 15 June – Bombardment of Copenhagen (1428): A fleet from the Hanseatic League attacks Copenhagen several times, using canons for the first time in the Nordic countries, but ultimately has to withdraw.

1429

- Copenhagen's Goldsmiths' Guild is mentioned for the first time. The town is home to six goldsmiths.
