= Mogens Gyldenstierne =

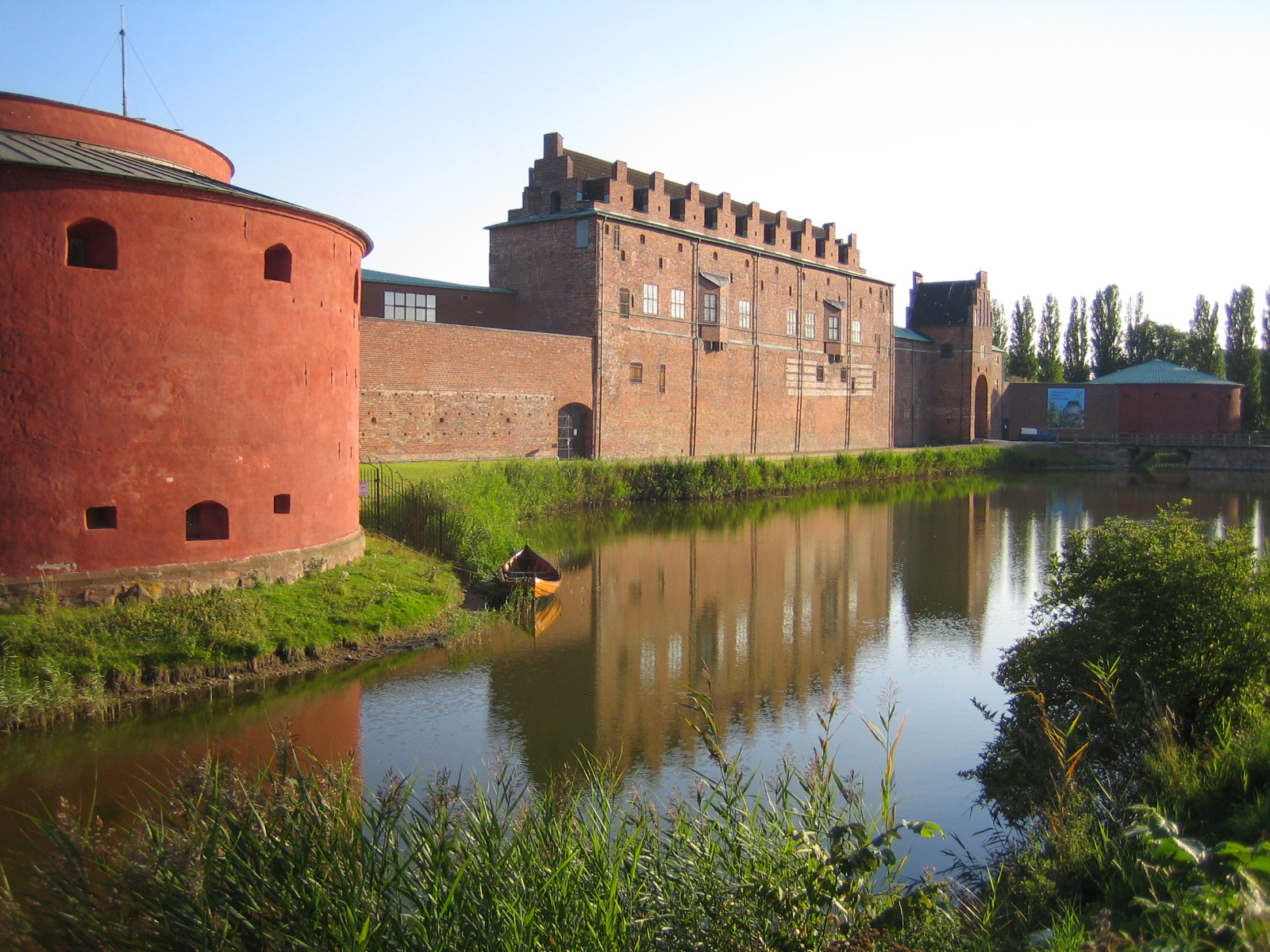
Malmöhus

Mogens Henrikssen Gyldenstjerne of Restrup og Iversnæs (1485 or 1481 – 9 October 1569 in Copenhagen) was a Danish nobleman and member of the Council of the Realm, who belonged to the illustrious Gyldenstierne family. He led the defense of Norway against the deposed King Christian II when the latter attempted to retake Norway.

Mogens Gyldenstjerne was a supporter of the Reformation and King Frederick I's foremost supporter in Norway. Gyldenstjerne later became fiefholder at Malmöhus and was steward of Copenhagen 1558–1566.

== Literature ==
- Breve til og fra Mogens Gyldenstjerne og Anne Sparre. Selskabet for udgivelse af kilder til dansk historie. København 1929-1941.
