= Køge Friary =

Køge Friary was a small Franciscan friary located in Køge, on the east coast of Zealand, Denmark.

== History ==
Køge received its privileges from the king in 1288, but was a relatively unimportant town until the 16th century when it began to grow with the assistance of several monarchs, and was successful in having several seasonal markets moved there from other nearby towns. In 1484 King Hans I of Denmark gave the Franciscans his farm at the west town gate (Vesterport). His mother, Queen Dorothea of Brandenburg, had developed a keen interest in the Franciscans and most of her own properties had been wrested from her control when her sons became kings of Denmark. It was at her behest that Vesterport was given by the king to the Franciscans. (It is unclear whether the property had been one of her own, or donated by the king on her behalf.)

Land for a burial ground was consecrated in 1485 next to the existing farm buildings. The friars modified the existing buildings, adding a chapel in 1509, one of the last Franciscan constructions in Denmark. The friary was dedicated to Saint Mary of Consolation and lay across from the Chapel of Saint Gertrude which had been built about 1330. In addition to the dormitory and refectory, the friars operated a small hospital. In 1523 Mogens Steen and his wife founded an almshouse called "Steen's Nooks" (Steens boder) with apartments for six persons, which was attached to the friary.

The famous bell maker, Johannes Fastenow, cast the chapel bell in 1522. The inscription reads: "When I call (then) hasten the holy Franciscan Brethren to send up their praises and prayers to God. Johannes Fastenow cast me when Brother Bernhard was Guardian in the year of our Lord 1522 for St Mary, the comfortress, friary of the order of friars minor in the town of Køge. O honoured king, bring peace".

== Dissolution ==
In 1530 the town council applied to King Frederick I for a Lutheran pastor to be sent to Køge. The Franciscans were especially targeted for expulsion because many Danes objected to the additional donations requested by the "beggar monks" (tiggermunker), as some Danes derisively referred to the Franciscans and other mendicant orders It was apparent that the citizens of Køge wanted the Franciscans out of town, but were unwilling to force them out, at least early on. When they delayed, a date was set by which they should leave the friary. The Franciscans believed that they were tricked into leaving.

The friars fled to other religious houses or simply took off their habits and became ordinary Danes. One Brother Johannes from Køge went to other towns and provided information which resulted in the expulsion of his former brothers from their friaries. Denmark became officially Lutheran in October 1536. All religious houses including the abandoned friary became crown property. The friary was given to the town and converted into a hospital for common people.

In time the situation of the friary buildings made it a prime location and the town fathers applied to the crown to have the property turned over to the town for the construction of a new town hall. The friary was demolished and the material used to build the new town hall, commensurate with the growing importance of Køge as a port town. St. Gertrude's Chapel was demolished in 1552. The almshouse survived until 1860, when it was also demolished. The bell from the friary chapel was moved to the town hall and is still in use today.

== Sources ==
- Anon, nd: Sct Nickolai Kirke of Gråbrødre Kloster i Køge (in Danish)
