= Esaias Fleischer (priest) =

Danish priest (1633–1697)

Esaias Fleischer (25 October 1633 – 5 February 1697) was a Danish priest.

He was a son of pharmacist Esaias Fleischer, and of Silesian roots. He studied at Sorø Academy before enrolling at the University of Copenhagen in 1652. He was influenced by Niels Svendsen Kronich, but because of this he deviated too much from the state church, and was sentenced to lose his academic rights in 1655. He then studied at the University of Rostock, University of Strasbourg, University of Leiden and University of Oxford, and also stayed in France and Italy. He returned to Denmark in 1664, where his reputation had been restored, partly because of his connection to Hans Nansen. Esaias' maternal aunt was Nansen's wife.

In 1665 Fleischer took his academic degree, and was hired as vicar in the Church of the Holy Ghost, Copenhagen. He was fired by bishop Hans Bagger, who in turn was ordered by the King, in 1679 for protesting the peace arrangements of the Scanian War.

The only known writings of Fleischer is an obituary of Hans Nansen. He supposedly studied and wrote about church history, but the writings are not known. He died in February 1697. He was a great-grandfather of Esaias Fleischer, born 1732.
