= Action of 12 July 1564 =

- Part of Northern Seven Years' War
Date	12 July 1564
Location	Warnemünde 54°10′56.5″N 12°4′48.4″E
Result	Danish victory

Belligerents
Sweden	Denmark-Norway

Commanders and leaders
Björnson	

Strength
1 ships	2 ships

Casualties and losses
1 ship and crew	Negligible

The action of 12 July 1564 was an engagement between naval forces of Denmark-Norway and Sweden during the Northern Seven Years' War.

This battle took place on 12 July 1564 near Warnemünde, when the Danish ships Byens Løffue 56, Morian 47, and David 42 defeated the Swedish ship Hvita Falk, under Captain Björnson, after several hours of fighting. At about noon Björnson blew his ship up so that it wouldn't be captured, and there were only two survivors.
