= Mogens Gøye =

Danish politician

- Born: c. 1470
- Died: 6 April 1544 (aged 73–74)
- Other names: Mogens Gøje, Mogens Gjøe, King of Northern Jutland
- Education: abroad
- Occupation: statesman
- Known for: Royal councillor of Danish Kings
- Father: Eskild Gøye
- Family: Gøye

Mogens Gøye (surname also spelled Gøje or Gjøe) (ca. 1470 – 6 April 1544) was a Danish statesman and Steward of the Realm, whose enormous wealth earned him the derogatory nickname "the King of Northern Jutland". Gøye was the Royal councillor of Danish Kings John I, the feuding Christian II and Frederick I, and Christian III. He was a key supporter of the Reformation in Denmark-Norway and Holstein. Often lauded by elder Danish historians as a knightly, social liberal upper-class idealist, Gøye is today viewed as a realist statesman understanding the need of a government and a moderate political attitude of the nobility.

He was the son of marsk Eskild Gøye, and brother of Royal councillor Henrik Gøye. Mogens Gøye was the father of Birgitte Gøye, who married admiral Herluf Trolle and co-founded Herlufsholm School. He was the grandfather of statesman Peder Oxe.

== Biography ==
Belonging to a very wealthy Jutland magnate family. Being educated abroad, Mogens Gøye was an outstanding man in the times of King John I (Hans). He accumulated large tracts of lands through inheritance, marriage, and large-scale buys, and became one of the richest men in Danish history. He was knighted in 1501, and became a member of the Royal Rigsraadet council of King John I in 1503.

During the reign of Christian II, Gøye was a leading Royal councillor, and performed diplomatic and special assignments for the King. In 1514, he was chosen as the substitute replacement of Christian II at the King's marriage to Isabella of Austria in the Netherlands. After the marriage, Gøye was appointed the marsk of Denmark. In 1516, he sold the house to Christian II, in which the King's mistress Dyveke and her mother Sigbrit Willoms were to reside, and in 1517 he arrested Torben Oxe, the suspected assassin of Dyveke. Though a representative of the great landowners himself, and an avid opponent of the bourgeois influence of Sigbrit, Gøye and Christian II seemed to maintain loyalty towards one another. Gøye even accepted some of the Royal reform plans, while trying to moderate them and to damp the dissatisfaction of his social peers. Sigbrit coined Gøye's derogatory nickname "the King of Northern Jutland", attempting to cast his loyalty to the Christian II in doubt.

Gøye initially supported Christian II during the 1522 nobility and clerical rebellion, but left him in March 1523 apparently under threat, accepting the accession of Frederick I. During the reign of Frederick I, Gøye had his real golden age. He was made Steward of the Realm in 1523, a post he retained until his death in 1544. Gøye again acted as a balancing force, curbing the vengeful attitudes of the nobility towards the peasant supporters of Christian II. He was instrumental in averting a peasant rebellion in Viborg in 1531. In religious matters he became an eager Protestant, openly supporting the work of Lutheran reformer Hans Tausen, in opposition to most of Rigsrådet, which earned him hostility from the Roman Catholic clergy. In spite of all efforts, he did not succeed in damping the social clash of interests.

After the death of Frederick in 1533, Mogens Gøye tried in vain to get Frederick's Lutheran son Prince Christian, Duke of Schleswig-Holstein elected king under the name Christian III of Denmark. At the outbreak of the ensuing Count's Feud civil war, Gøye forced through the nobility's Election of Christian III in Jutland in 1534, and was a most loyal supporter of Christian III for the rest of the war. After the victory of Christian III and the Reformation in Denmark-Norway and Holstein in 1536–1537, Gøye continued as Steward during the new government, but he was weakened by ill health, and was gradually overshadowed by Johan Friis.
