= Peder Palladius =

Danish theologian (1503–1560)

Petrus Palladius
- Bishop of Zealand
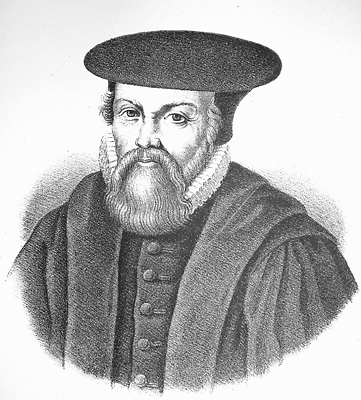
- Church: Church of Denmark
- In office: 1537–1560
- Successor: Hans Albertsen

Personal details
- Born: 1503 Ribe, Denmark
- Died: 3 January 1560 (aged 56–57) Copenhagen, Denmark

Peder Palladius (1503 – 3 January 1560) was a Danish theologian, Protestant reformer, and bishop of Zealand. As the first protestant bishop in Denmark, he oversaw the conversion of ecclesiastic affairs. He helped create the church ordinance which founded the Church of Denmark, produced a Danish translation of the Bible, and removed Catholic images and rituals from his diocese.

== Early life and education ==
Peder was born in Ribe in 1503. Little information is known about his childhood. Palladius’ own published account of his childhood suggests that he grew up near Ribe and attended school there ca. 1510–1515. He describes his father, Esbern Jensen, as a devout layman. Though his father was illiterate, he had memorised much of the gospel and chastised his son when he failed to recite it properly. Peder had a younger brother, Niels Palladius, who was born in 1510. Niels followed in Peder’s footsteps, also becoming a protestant theologian and member of the clergy.

By 1530, Peder was employed as a school teacher in Odense. He was later sponsored by the city’s mayor, Mikkel Pedersen, to study in Wittenberg along with his son, Knud Mikkelsen, and another young man from the city. On September 3, 1531, “Petrus Esbernus Pladius” matriculated at the University of Wittenberg. The origin of his latin name is uncertain. Petrus is the latinized version of his given name, Peder, while Esbernus is in reference to his father, Esbern. However, his chosen surname is of unclear origins. Some sources speculate that he was born Peder Esbern Plade or Plad, having adopted the name Palladius as a latinized version of his surname. Other sources suggest that Plad was a nickname he received as schoolboy, in reference to his father's supposed work as a shoemaker. Alternatively, the name may have been given to him by Philip Melanchthon, in reference to Pallas Athene.

He obtained a master’s degree in 1533 and began working towards a doctorate in theology. Palladius spent approximately six years studying in Wittenberg. While there, he had become closely acquainted with the reformation movement for which the University became famous. Palladius described his own conversion to Lutheranism in a 1550 letter to the Catholic bishop of Holar in Iceland, wherein he illustrated his realisation that the teachings of papism were inconsistent with those of Jesus Christ. His education and proximity to the epicentre of the reform movement brought him to the attention of King Christian III. Having forcefully removed the existing Catholic bishops from Denmark, Christian III needed to establish his own church and clergy. A selection of Danish graduates of Wittenberg were recommended. The king was advised to allow Palladius to complete his doctorate in Wittenberg before he was recalled to Denmark. The completion of his studies were funded by the King, and he then was granted his doctorate in 1537.

== Career ==
After earning his doctorate in 1537, Palladius was invited to the synod which established the Church of Denmark along with fellow Wittenburg graduates Jørgen Sadolin, Hans Tausen, and Frans Vormordsen. Following the church’s formation, Palladius was appointed as the “superintendent” of the Diocese of Zealand on 2 September 1537, a position which replaced the former archbishop. He was also designated as a professor of theology at the University of Copenhagen.

In an effort to reform the church, Palladius directed the removal of what he called “Uryd” from churches within his diocese. Among these were images of saints, altars, relics, and texts for mass services which he considered remnants of the papist era. He also restricted access to pilgrimage sites within the diocese, though he was unable to abolish the practice. His efforts were met with some resistance from clergy within the diocese, though many acquiesced to the reforms to protect their own interests. A 1551 letter from the king mentions that many of the clergy remained steadfast in their beliefs, much to his frustration, and were to be instructed directly by Palladius on his behalf.

Palladius also came into conflict with the noblemen and Danish ruling class. Prior to the reformation, the majority of bishops were from powerful families which could afford to educate their children to a high level. These bishops had ties to the existing hierarchy. By contrast, Palladius had come from humble means and was not beholden to their system of power. As a result, nobles frequently opposed and challenged his authority.

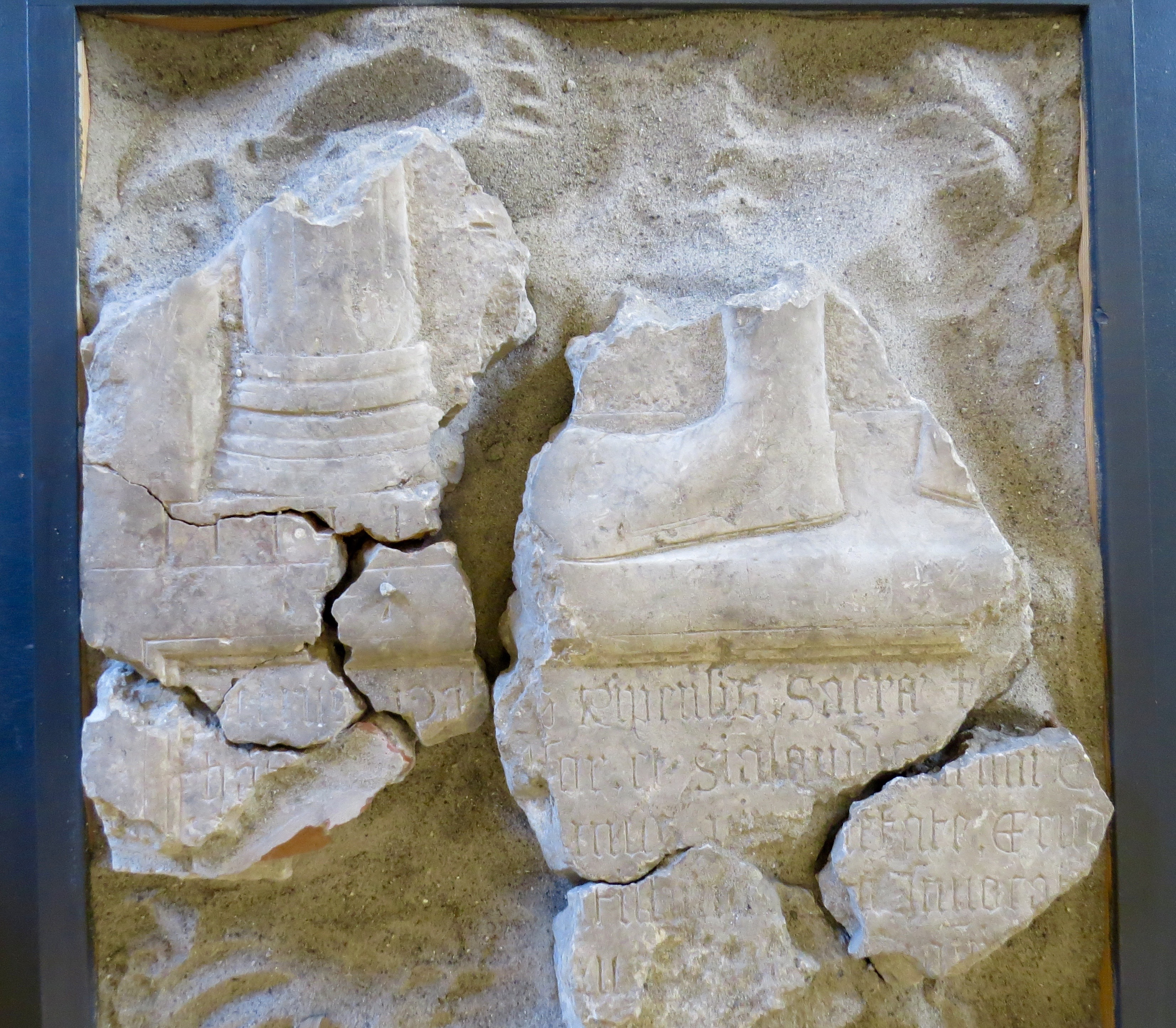
Remnants of Palladius' original tombstone on display at the Church of Our Lady.

Palladius suffered a stroke in 1555 which caused his health to deteriorate. For several years afterwards, he was bedridden. During this period he produced a large number of theological works, many of which gained him international renown and were translated into Polish, German, and English. During Peder’s illness, his brother Niels took over many of his duties, including crowning King Frederik II on 20 August 1559. In 1558, Hans Albertsen was appointed to take over Peder’s role as theological chair at the University of Copenhagen; Albertsen also became Palladius’ assistant during the last years of his life. After a long period of declining health, he died 3 January 1560 in Copenhagen and was buried at the Church of Our Lady. After Peder’s death, Niels Palladius consecrated his brother’s successor, Hans Albertsen.

He was survived by his wife, Kirstine née Pedersdatter. They are not known to have had children. His gravesite was destroyed by a fire in the Church of Our Lady during the Battle of Copenhagen. The remnants of the tombstone are today exhibited on the ground floor of the church.

== Works ==
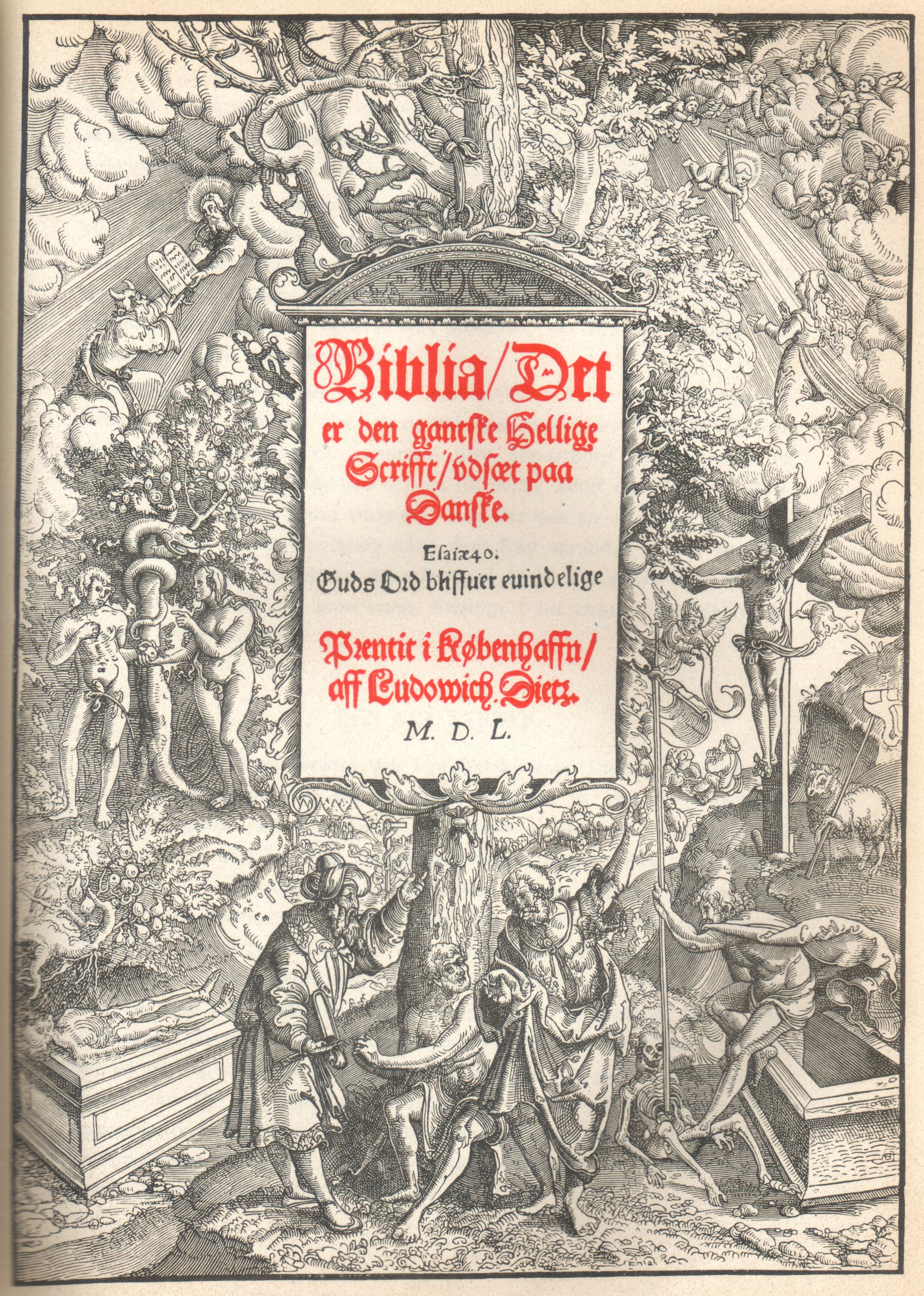
Christian III's Danish bible, 1550

Christian III commissioned a Danish translation of the bible, which Palladius oversaw and published in 1550. As directed by the king, the translation largely followed Luther’s High German translation from 1545. The introduction to the Danish translation, however, is attributed to Palladius. He published a number of short writings during his time as bishop in an effort to promote a new style of worship and theological practice. Several of these are translations of other evangelical works into Danish, mostly authored by Luther. He was also responsible for the Visistatsbogen, which remains an important historical source. Palladius wrote most of his own literary works in Latin.

=== Bibliography ===
- The Little Danish Catechism (Danish: Den lille danske Katekismus), 1537, translation of Luther's Small Catechism
- A Handbook for Parish Priests for Evangelical Church Service (Danish: En Haandbog for Sognepræster til evangelisk Kirketjeneste), 1538, translation of Luther’s work
- The Church Ordinance in Danish (Danish: Kirkeordinansen paa dansk), 1539
- A Rather Simple Prayer Book (Danish: En ret enfoldig Bedebog), 1541, translation of Luther’s work
- A Short Explanation of the Catechism for Norwegian Parish Priests (Latin: Brevis expositio Catechismi pro parochis Norvegianis), 1542
- Daily Life of the Ministers of the Word of God (Latin: De vita ministrorum verbi divini qvotidiana), 1547
- A Spiritual Recipe against Pestilence (Danish: En aandelig Recept mod Pestilence), 1553
- A teaching of the Fruit of Faith Called Mildness and Meekness (Danish: En Undervisning om den Troens Frugt, som kaldes Mildhed of Sagtmodighed), 1553
- The Strangest Places in the Holy Scriptures, which forbid and condemn the former charges (Danish: De mærkeligste Steder i den hellige Skrift, som forbyde og fordømme den formaledidede Aager), 1553
- A New Evangelical Rhyme-collection (Danish: En ny evangelisk Rimstok), 1554
- St. Peter’s Ship (Danish: St. Peders Skib), 1554
- Certain pious songs, which are commonly called responses (Latin: Pia qvædam cantica qvæ vulgo responsoria vocantur), 1554
- On the Honourable Explanation of Our Lord Jesus Christ on Mount Tabor (Danish: Om vor Herres Jesu Chrisiti ærefulde Forklarelse paa Thabor Bjærg), 1555
- Provincial visitation formula (Latin: Formula visitationis provinvialis), 1555
- Om de ukristelige, forskrækkelige og gruselige Gudsbespottelse, some er Sværgen og Banden, 1556
- Drukken-skabs Aflysning, eller Aarsage, hvorfor en Kristen aldeles bør at sky og fly den formaledidede Drukkenskab, 1556
- Advarsel om den lappede og forkludede Hosedjævel, som er opvakt mod al Tugt og Ære, 1556
- Om den hellige Ægteskabs Stat, 1556
- Introduction to the Prophetic and Apostolic Scriptures (Latin: Isagog ad libros propheticos et apostolicos, 1557
