= Esaias Fleischer (pharmacist) =

Danish pharmacist

Esaias Fleischer (c.1586 – 13 January 1663) was a Danish pharmacist.

He hailed from Silesia, and migrated to Denmark in the early 17th century. He is known as a pharmacist at least from 1613. In 1619 he was given the right to open a pharmacy in Bergen in the Province of Norway, but he probably did not take the offer. He continued his career in Copenhagen, and served as pharmacist for the Danish Royal Court from 1633 to 1639.

In 1650 his pharmacy privilege was made heritable, and his son Gregorius Fleischer inherited the pharmacy. Another son Esaias Fleischer became a notable clergyman. Esaias Fleischer was married twice, last to Maren Hansdatter, a sister of Hans Nansen's wife. He died in January 1663.
