= Eske Bille =

Danish diplomat and statesman

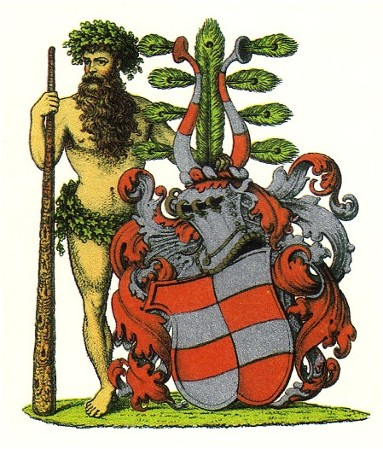
Coat of arms of the Bille family

Eske Bille (c. 1480 – 9 February 1552) was a Danish diplomat and statesman

== Biography ==
In 1510, he was made governor and commander at Copenhagen Castle. In 1514 he was transferred to Hagenskov on Funen.

He served as Commander of Bergenhus from 1529 to 1537 and Steward of the Realm in Denmark from 1547 until his death. He became a member of the Council of the Realm in 1523 in Denmark and member of the Council of the Realm in 1533 in Norway. In 1537, he became a knight, the highest rank of Danish nobility.

Bille is most famous for the churches he had demolished in Bergen, when he was Commander of Bergenhus, and he became known by the nickname "Church Breaker". He completed the demolition of Apostle Church (Apostelkyrkja) and demolished Christ Cathedral (Kristkyrkja). Both churches and other buildings had to be removed in order to enable the defense of the city and port.

Eske Bille was a member of the Bille family, which became the most politically powerful noble family of Denmark during his lifetime. He was a son of Peder Bille til Svanholm and Anne Knudsdatter Gyldenstierne, brother of Bishop Ove Bille and first cousin of statesman Claus Bille.
