= Skipper Clement =

Danish rebel fighter

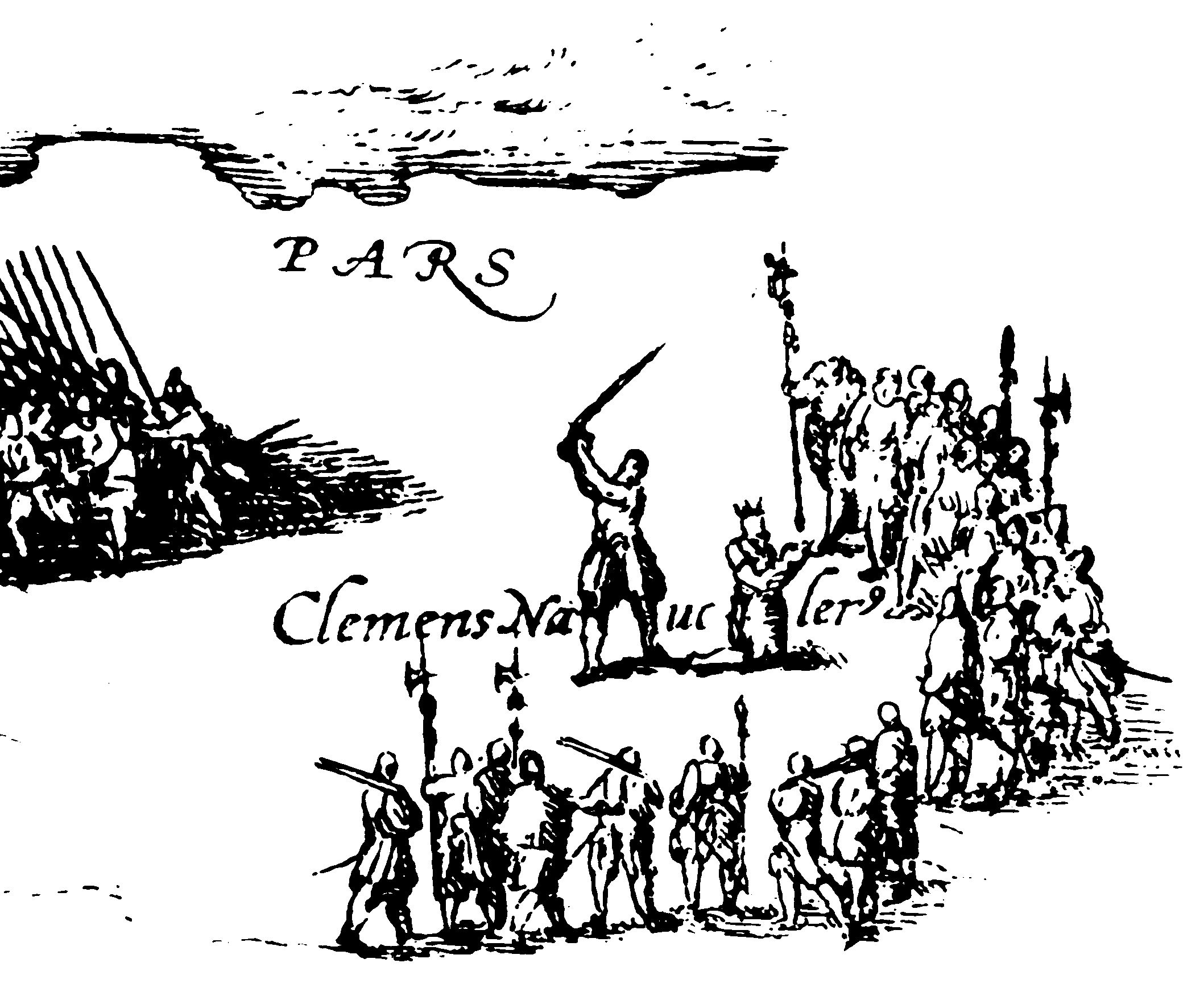
An engraving of 1574 depicting Skipper Clement's execution

Klemen Andersen "Skipper" Clement (c. 1484 – 9 September 1536) was a Danish merchant, captain, privateer who led a peasant rebellion against the Jutlandish gentry that was part of the Count's Feud (Grevens Fejde), a civil war.

== Background ==
Clement was born to a farmer family in Aaby Parish (Aaby Sogn i Kjer Herred) in the district of Vendsyssel in North Jutland. He became a merchant in Aalborg and later captain and vice admiral in the navy of King Christian II of Denmark. In 1523, Christian II was sent into exile and his uncle, Frederick I of Denmark had taken over the throne. In 1525, Clement mutinied and became a privateer.

== Count's Feud ==
Clement later allied himself to Christopher of Oldenburg. At Count Christoffer's instruction, he instigated the peasants of Vendsyssel and North Jutland to rise up against the nobles. On 16 October 1534 the peasant army of Clement, re-enforced with professional soldiers from Count Christoffer, met the army of the Jutland nobility, which had been sent to crush the revolt. The Battle of Svenstrup (Slaget ved Svenstrup) resulted in the defeat of the nobility's army. For a couple of months the revolting peasants controlled a major part of northern Jutland. They expelled the noblemen and burned down many of their manor houses. However, in the long run the peasant army was too poorly armed and too undisciplined. King Christian III of Denmark made a separate peace with Count Christoffer and his general Johan Rantzau was freed to fight the peasant revolt.

In December 1534, the army of Johan Rantzau defeated the peasant army which had retreated to Aalborg and strengthened the defenses of the city. After a hard battle, Rantzau's army overcame the defenses, sacked the city and killed as many as 2,000 people. Clement managed to escape but was betrayed and captured by his enemies. He was kept in prison until the end of the civil war and was then executed by breaking on the wheel in Viborg, Denmark.

== Evaluation ==
Later historians and fiction writers have admired Clement as a revolutionary figure and a champion for the rights of the common man. Also as a local North Jutland hero, he is admired and a statue was erected there in 1931. The depth of his social or ideological engagement is unprovable, but as the last active and perhaps most influential peasant rebel in Danish history, he might be viewed a Danish parallel of Wat Tyler in England, Thomas Müntzer in Germany and Yemelyan Pugachev in Russia.

== Other sources ==
- Dansk Biografisk leksikon, vol.3, (Copenhagen: 1979)
- Politikens Danmarkshistorie, vol 6, by Svend Cedergreen Bech, (Copenhagen: 1963)
