= Daniel Rantzau =

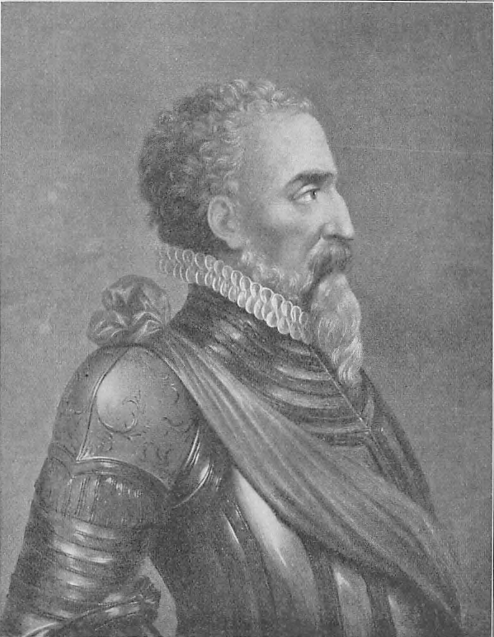
- Born: 1529; Deutsch-Nienhof, Duchy of Schleswig
- Died: 11 November 1569 (aged 39–40); Halland, Denmark
- Burial place: Saint Catherine Church
- Education: University of Wittenberg
- Relatives: Johan Rantzau
- Military career
- Branch: Royal Danish Army
- Rank: Field marshal
- Conflicts: Northern Seven Years' War; Battle of Axtorna; Winter Campaign; Siege of Varberg Fortress †

Daniel Rantzau (1529 – 11 November 1569) was a Danish-German field marshal. He was known for his leadership during the Northern Seven Years' War. For some years, he fought in Germany and Italy, and also took part in the Danish conquest of Dithmarschen in western Holstein during 1559. Rantzau also seems to have been a clear pro-war spokesman before the outbreak of the Northern Seven Years' War with Sweden in 1563.

== Northern Seven Years' War ==
Rantzau was born at Deutsch-Nienhof in Schleswig-Holstein. He studied at the University of Wittenberg. A distant relative of Johan Rantzau, Daniel Rantzau was raised in Holstein, and received a solid academic education but preferred a military career.

At the start of the Northern Seven Years' War, Rantzau was a sub-commander with the rank of colonel but he distinguished himself in some minor struggles during the first fruitless years. In 1565, he was promoted to commander-in-chief, but his position was weak at the start due to a lack of results on the battlefield. However, in December of the same year Rantzau defeated the Swedish army during the Battle of Axtorna, an event which strengthened his position. During the following years, he successfully ravaged Swedish areas and established himself as the most able Danish military leader in spite of the lack of a breakthrough. However, a standing conflict about the pay of the soldiers created serious friction between the Danish noble officers and Peder Oxe, the Steward of the Realm.

From 1567 to 1568, Rantzau carried off what is still considered his main military exploit, his Winter Campaign (Vinterfälttåget) through Småland and Östergötland. During the campaign, he defeated some minor Swedish armies and after having given up an attack on Stockholm, saved his whole army during a risky but successful retreat across the frozen lake Sommen. The campaign had no real military results but shook the Swedish defense. In November 1569, during an attack on Swedish-occupied Varberg Fortress in Halland, Rantzau was killed by a cannonball.

Localities of the Winter campaign. Red dots marks plundered and burned localities. The crossing of Sommen is in blue.

== Legacy ==
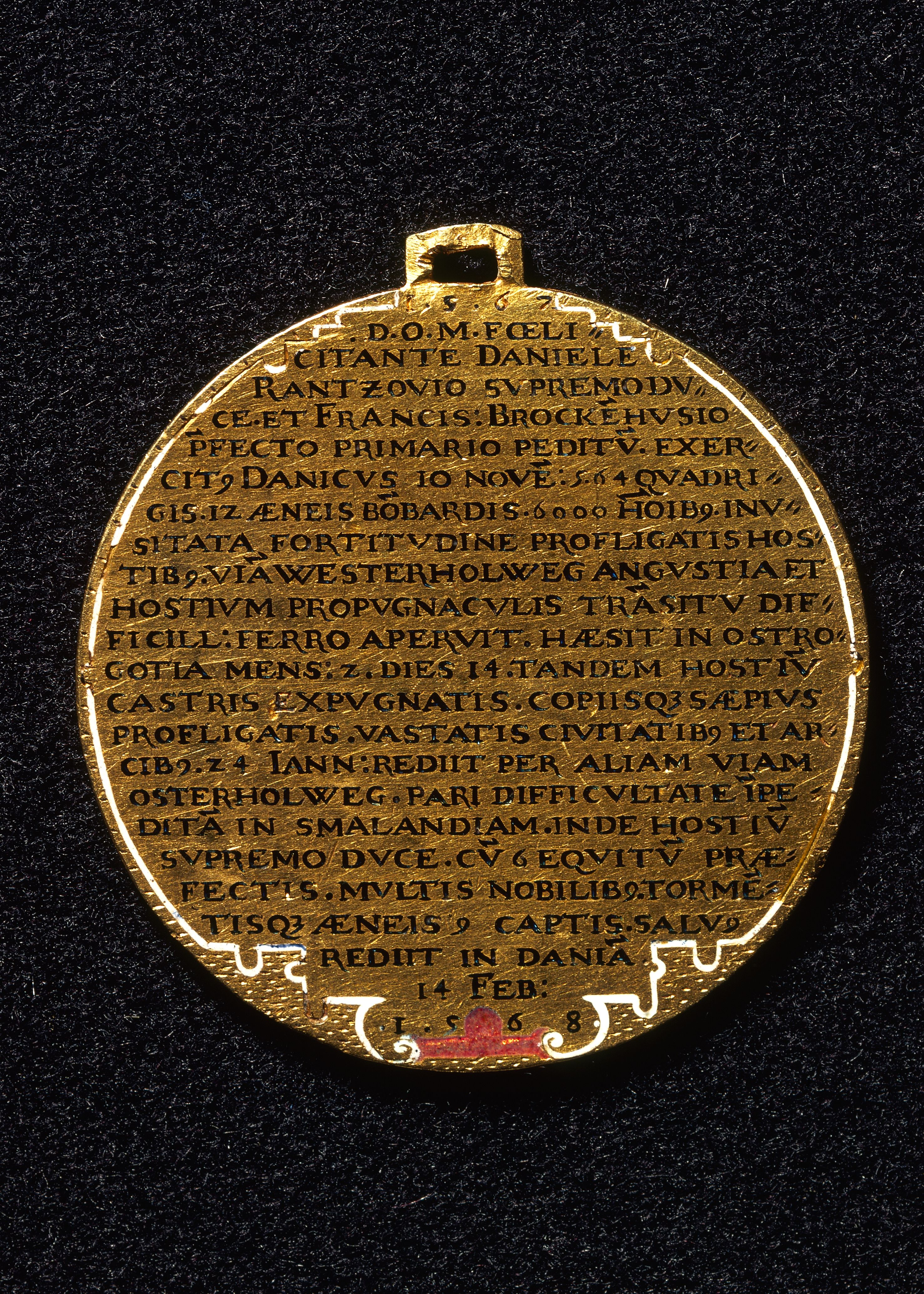
Frederick II's medal commemorating Daniel Rantzau.

Today, although quite overshadowed by his relative Johan Rantzau in public memory, Daniel Rantzau is considered the more brilliant tactician of the two. Military historians in general regard him as one of the few first-rate military leaders of the war from 1563–70.

In 1568, Frederick II had a medal struck in memory of Daniel Rantzau. The reverse side fratures a long inscription.

== Literature ==
- Dansk Biografisk Leksikon, vol. 11, 1982.
- Salmonsens Konversationsleksikon, vol. 19, 1925.
