= Jørgen Sadolin =

Danish bishop (c. 1490–1559)

Jørgen Jensen Sadolin (c. 1490 – 19 December 1559 in Odense) was a Danish reformer and first protestant bishop of the Diocese of Funen.

== Early life and origins ==
He was the son of Jens Christensen, a curate and subsequently a canon of Viborg Cathedral, and likely born c. 1499 out of wedlock, as his Catholic opponents frequently took care to remind him. He himself never used the name Sadolin, which seems to have been invented subsequently by his son Hans, and points to the fact that the family were originally saddle-makers.

== Career ==
First records of Sadolin come are dated to 1 December 1525, when Frederick I permitted him to settle at Viborg to teach young persons of the poorer classes "whatever might be profitable." On this occasion he is described as "magister" and no doubt got his degree abroad, where he seems to have been won for the Reformation.

He sided with Hans Tausen when the latter first began to preach the gospel at Viborg and Tausen, though himself only in priest's orders, shortly before he left the place, ordained Sadolin (1529). Amongst "the free priests" who attended the herredag of Copenhagen in 1530 Sadolin occupied a prominent place. Frederick subsequently transferred him to Funen, where he acted, according to his own expression, as "adjutor in verbo" to the Bishop of Odense.

At the diocesan council on 27 May 1532, during the absence of the bishop, he presented to the assembled priests a translation of Luther's catechism, with Luther's name omitted, preceded earnestly in favour of a better system of education and a more practical application of the Christian life, which occupies a conspicuous place in the literature of the Danish Reformation. In the following year Sadolin published the first Danish translation of the Confession of Augsburg.

On 2 September 1537 he was consecrated by Johann Bugenhagen as the superintendent, or first evangelical bishop, of Funen. As bishop he was remarkable for the success with which he provided the necessary means for the support of churches, schools and hospitals in his widespread diocese, which had been deprived of its usual sources of income by the wholesale confiscation of church property. Towards the Catholics he adopted a firm, but moderate and reasonable, tone, and his indulgence towards the monks in St Knud's cloister drew down upon him a fierce attack from the Puritan clergyman of Odense, who absurdly accused him of being a crypto-Catholic. He gave the funeral oration over Christian III in St John's Church at Odense in February 1559, though now very infirm and blind, and died at the end of the same year.
