= Peder Oxe =

Danish finance minister

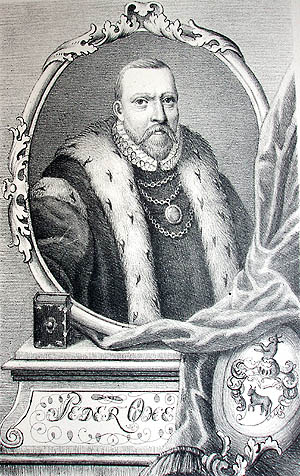
Peder Oxe

Peder Oxe (Peder Oxe til Nielstrup; 7 January 1520 – 24 October 1575) was a Danish finance minister and Steward of the Realm.

== Background ==
At the age of twelve, he was sent abroad to complete his education and resided at the principal universities of Germany, the Netherlands, France, Italy, and Switzerland for seventeen years. On his return, he found both his parents dead, and was appointed the guardian of his eleven young brothers and sisters, in which capacity, profiting by the spoliation of the church, he accumulated immense riches.

== Career ==
His extraordinary financial abilities and pronounced political capacity soon found ample scope in public life. In 1552, he was raised to the dignity of Rigsraad (councillor of state); in 1554, he successfully accomplished his first diplomatic mission by adjusting the differences between the elector of Saxony and Joachim II Hector, Elector of Brandenburg. The same year, he held the post of governor of Copenhagen and shared with Byrge Trolle the control of the treasury.

A few years later he incurred the royal disfavour in the administration of public property. In the spring of 1557, Oxe and the king quarrelled over a mutual property exchange. Failing to compromise matters with the king, Oxe fled to Germany in 1558 and engaged in political intrigues with the adventurer Wilhelm von Grumbach for the purpose of dethroning Frederick II in favor of Christina of Lorraine, the daughter of Christian II. But the financial difficulties of Frederick II during the stress of the Northern Seven Years' War compelled him, in 1566, to recall the great financier, when his confiscated estates were restored to him and he was reinstated in all his offices and dignities.

A change for the better immediately ensued. The finances were speedily put on an excellent footing, means were provided for carrying on the war to a successful issue (one of the chief expedients being the raising of the Sound Dues) and on the conclusion of peace, Oxe, as lord treasurer, not only reduced the national debt considerably, but redeemed a large portion of the alienated crown-lands. He reformed the coinage, developed trade and commerce and introduced numerous agricultural reforms, especially on his own estates, which he was never weary of enlarging, so that on his death he was the wealthiest landowner in Denmark.

Oxe died on 24 October 1575, after contributing more than any other statesman of his day to raise Denmark–Norway, for a brief period, to the rank of a great power in Europe.
