= Steward of the Realm (Denmark) =

Office at the Royal Danish Court

- Rigshofmester (Danish)
- Longest serving Erik Ottesen Rosenkrantz; 1456–1480
- Royal Danish court
- Reports to: the Monarch
- Nominator: Council of the Realm (from 1648)
- Appointer: the Monarch
- Term length: At His Majesty's pleasure
- Abolished: 1665

Steward of the Realm (Danish: Rigshofmester) was an office at the Royal Danish Court. With the coronation of Eric VII of Denmark in 1396, it became an important office, taking over the role of the Seneschal (Danish: Drost) as the de facto prime minister of the country. Prior to that the Rigshofmester had merely been the administrative leader of the Royal Court.

The office was abolished with the institution of absolute monarchy in Denmark-Norway in 1660.

== Danish Stewards of the Realm ==
Year	Steward of the Realm
1373	NN. Frentzel
1385	Degenhard Buggenhagen
1387	Bent Byg Grubbe
1397	Mikkel Rud
1400–1409	Jens Due
1412–1413	Anders Jacobsen Lunge
1414–1416	Jens Due
1417–1423	Anders Jacobsen Lunge
1424	Erik Segebodsen Krummedige
1429–1440	Albrecht Morer
1441–1442	Nielsen Gyldenstjerne
1445–1452	Otte Nielsen Rosenkrantz
1453–1456	Niels Eriksen Gyldenstjerne
1456–1480	Erik Ottesen Rosenkrantz
1482–1487	Strange Nielsen Strangesen Bild
1489–1502	Poul Laxmand
1513–1515	Niels Eriksen Rosenkrantz
1523–1544	Mogens Gøye
1547–1552	Eske Bille
1567–1575	Peder Oxe
1596–1601	Christoffer Valkendorff
1632	Frands Rantzau
1641–51	Corfitz Ulfeldt
1651–60	Joachim Gersdorff
