= 1570s in Denmark =

Events from the 1570s in Denmark.

== Incumbents ==
- Monarch – Frederick II
- Steward of the Realm – Peder Oxe (until 1575)

== Events ==
- 13 December 1570 – the Treaty of Stettin is signed, ending the Northern Seven Years' War.
- 10 May 1572 – Povel Huitfeldt is appointed the first Governor-General of Norway.
- 25 June – Oluf Mouritsen Krognos, privy councillor and landowner (born 1535)
- 1574 – King Frederick II begins rebuilding Kronborg, transforming the medieval fortress into a Renaissance castle.
- 1577 – Ludvig Munk is appointed Governor-General of Norway, succeeding Povel Huitfeldt.
- 1579 – The construction of Skovsbo Castle is completed.

== Births ==
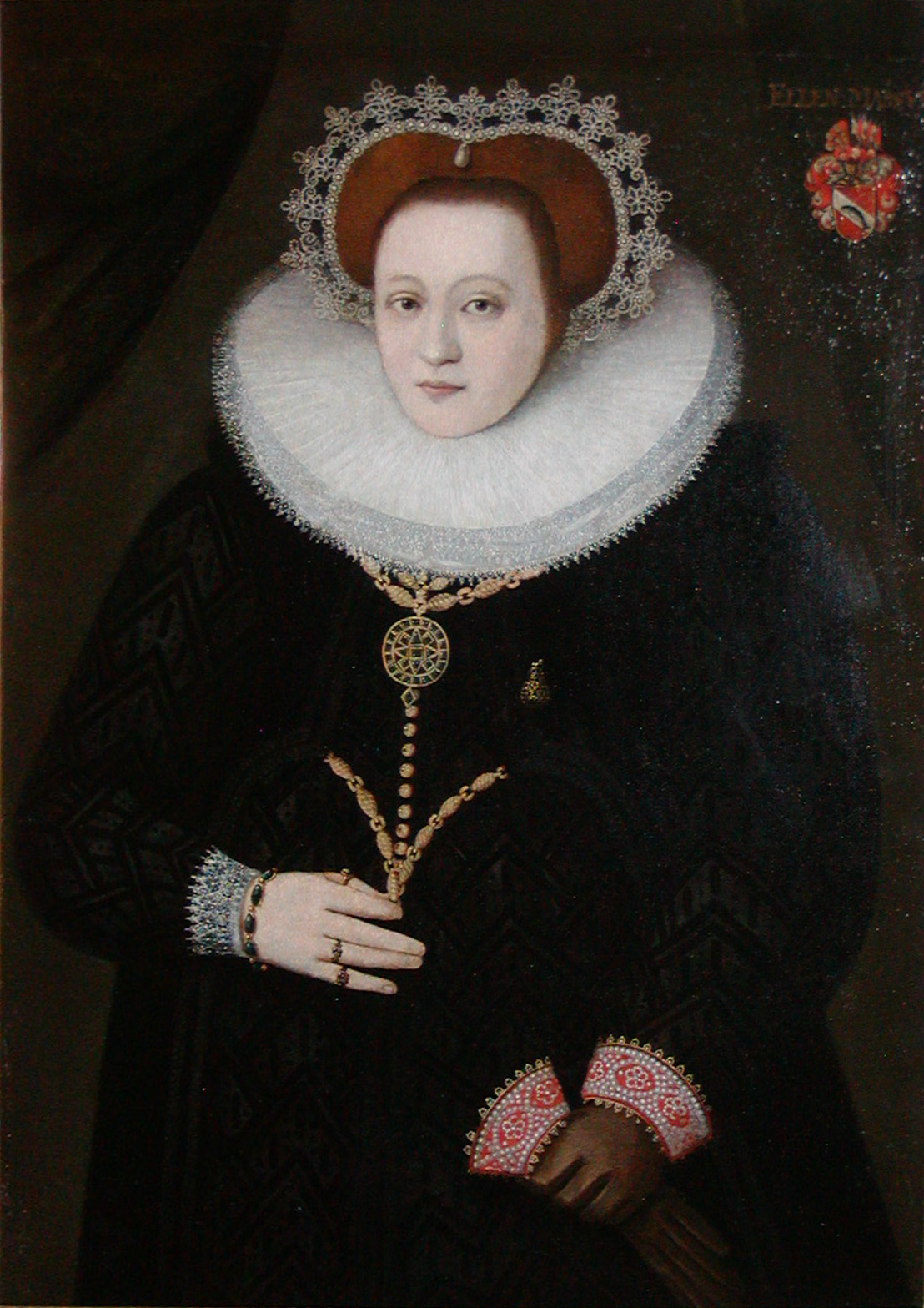
Ellen Marsvin.

1571

- 21 January – Johannes Isacius Pontanus, dutch historiographer (died 1639 in the Netherlands)
- Undated – Jonas Charisius, physician, politician, and ambassador (died 1619)

1572

- 11 February – Ellen Marsvin, noble, landowner (died 1649)
- 23 November – Albret Skeel, Admiral of the Realm (died 1639)

1573

- 25 August – Elizabeth of Denmark, Duchess of Brunswick-Wolfenbüttel (died 1625 in Germany)

1574

- 12 December – Anne of Denmark, Queen Consort of Scotland, England and Ireland (died 1618)

1577

- 12 April – Christian IV, King of Denmark (died 1648)
- 11 October – Jørgen Lunge, Rigsmarsk (died 1619)

1578

- 12 April – Otte Steensen Brahe, landowner and money lender (died 1651)
- 11 May – Sophie Axelsdatter Brahe, noblewoman and landowner (1646)
- 30 December – Ulrik of Denmark, duke of Holstein and Schleswig (died 1624 in Germany)
- Undated – Christoffer Dybvad, mathematician (died 1622)

1579

- 6/10 April – Claus Daa, noble and admiral of the realm (died 1641)
- 3 July – Rigborg Brockenhuus, noble (died 1641)

== Deaths ==
- 7 October 1571 – Dorothea of Saxe-Lauenburg, Queen consort of Denmark (born 1511 in Germany)
- 26 July 1574 – Birgitte Gøye, Danish noblewoman (born 1511)
- 24 October 1575 – Peder Oxe, statesman (born 1520)
- 11 November 1575 – Dorothea of Denmark, princess of Denmark and Duchess consort of Mecklenburg (born 1528)
- 15 April 1578 – James Hepburn, 4th Earl of Bothwell, Scottish nobleman, imprisoned in Denmark (born c. 1534)
- 5 July 1579 – Christen Munk, Governor-general of Norway (born 1520)
