= 1641 in Norway =

- Centuries: 16th; 17th; 18th; 19th
- Decades: 1620s; 1630s; 1640s; 1650s; 1660s
- See also: 1641 in Denmark; List of years in Norway

Events in the year 1641 in Norway.

== Incumbents ==
- Monarch: Christian IV.

== Events ==
- 5 July - The town of Christianssand is formally founded by King Christian IV of Denmark-Norway.

== Arts and literature ==
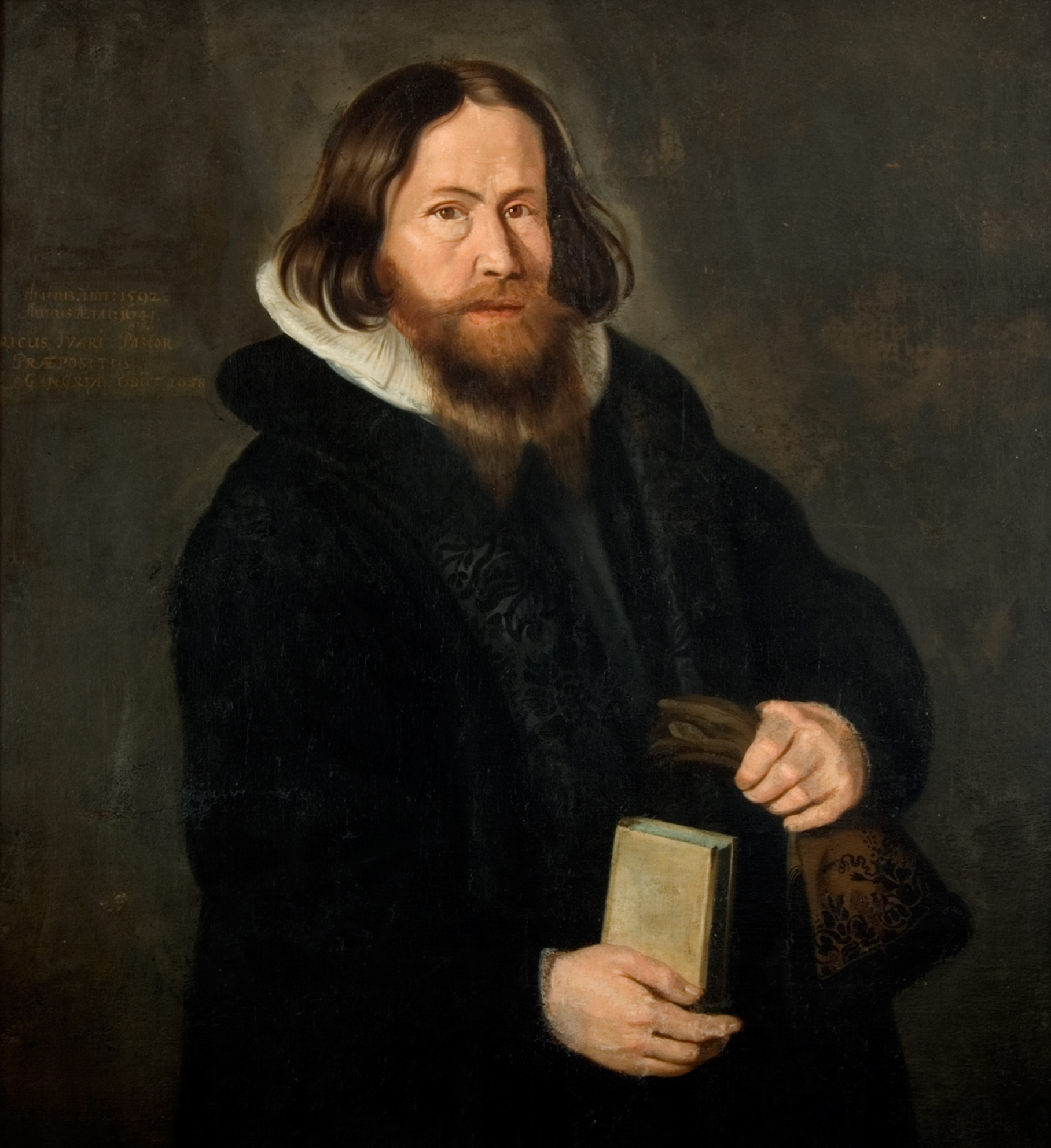
A 1641 portrait of Erik Iversen Nordal, painted by Elias Fiigenschoug

- Elias Fiigenschoug's portrait of Erik Iversen Nordal, is painted. (It is located in Leikanger Church, where Nordal served as priest from 1618 to 1658).
- The construction of a new Town Hall of Christiania was finished (the building is now called the "Old Town Hall") .
