= 1650 in Norway =

- Centuries: 16th; 17th; 18th; 19th
- Decades: 1630s; 1640s; 1650s; 1660s; 1670s
- See also: 1650 in Denmark; List of years in Norway

Events in the year 1650 in Norway:

== Incumbents ==
- Monarch: Frederick III

== Events ==
- Aasgaardstrand is given town status as a ladested under the nearby town of Tønsberg.

== Births ==
- Anders Been, painter and court dwarf (died 1739).
- Hans Hansen Lilienskiold, jurist, government official and civil servant (died 1703).
- Christian Frederik Powisch, government official (died 1711).
