= 1649 in Norway =

- Centuries: 16th; 17th; 18th; 19th
- Decades: 1620s; 1630s; 1640s; 1650s; 1660s
- See also: 1649 in Denmark; List of years in Norway

Events in the year 1649 in Norway.

== Incumbents ==
- Monarch: Frederick III.

== Events ==
- The Hassel Iron Works, starts to operate.

== Births ==
- 25 April – Ludvig Stoud, priest (died 1705).
- 27 September – Jonas Danilssønn Ramus, priest and historian (died 1718).
