= 1653 in Denmark =

- Decades: 1630s; 1640s; 1650s; 1660s; 1670s
- See also: Other events of 1653; List of years in Denmark

Events from the year 1653 in Denmark.

== Incumbents ==
- Monarch – Frederick III
- Steward of the Realm – Joachim Gersdorff

== Culture ==
=== Art ===
- Jørgen Ringnis completes the altarpiece for Nørre Alslev Church.
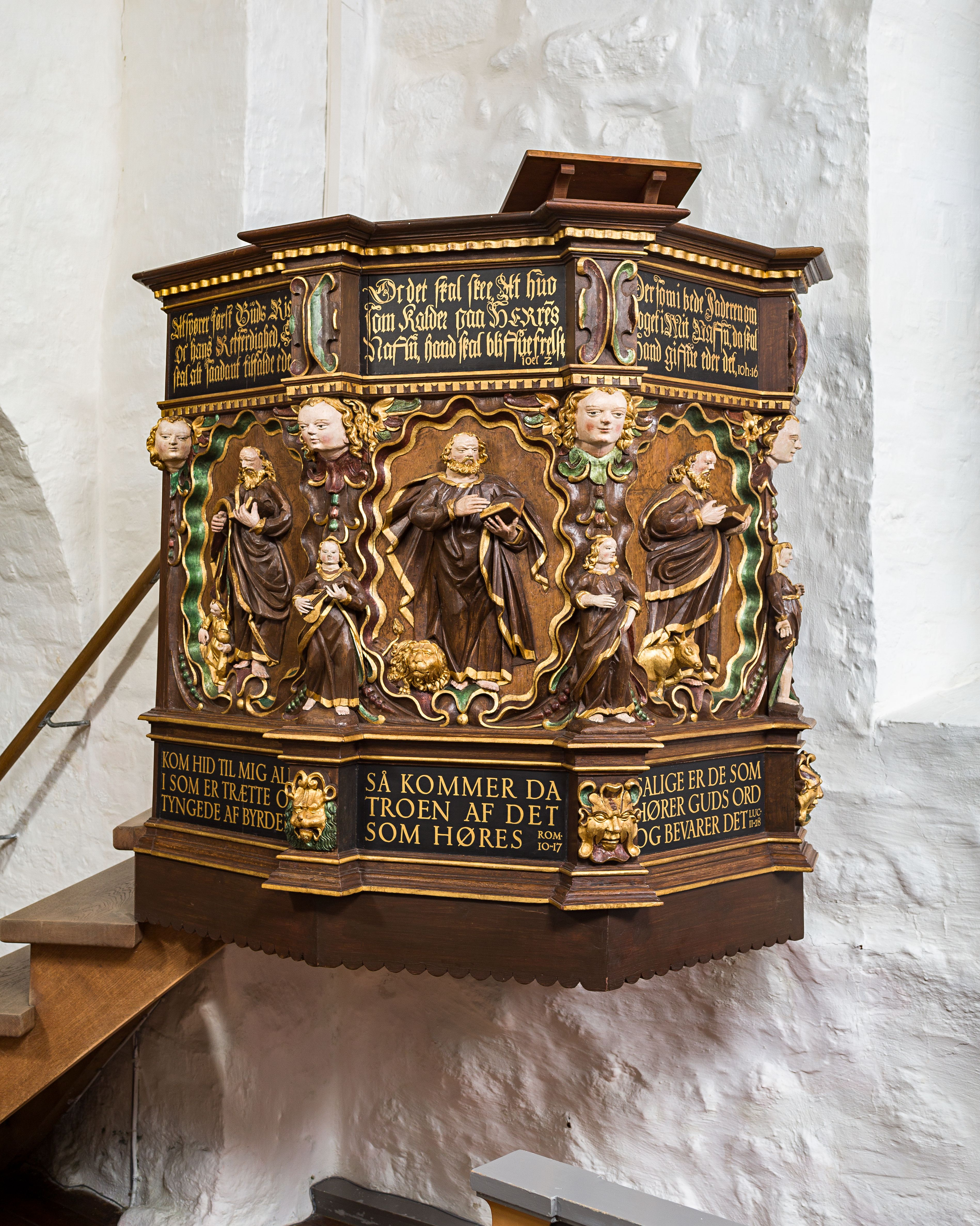
Hans Nielsen Bang's pulpit in Skeby Church.

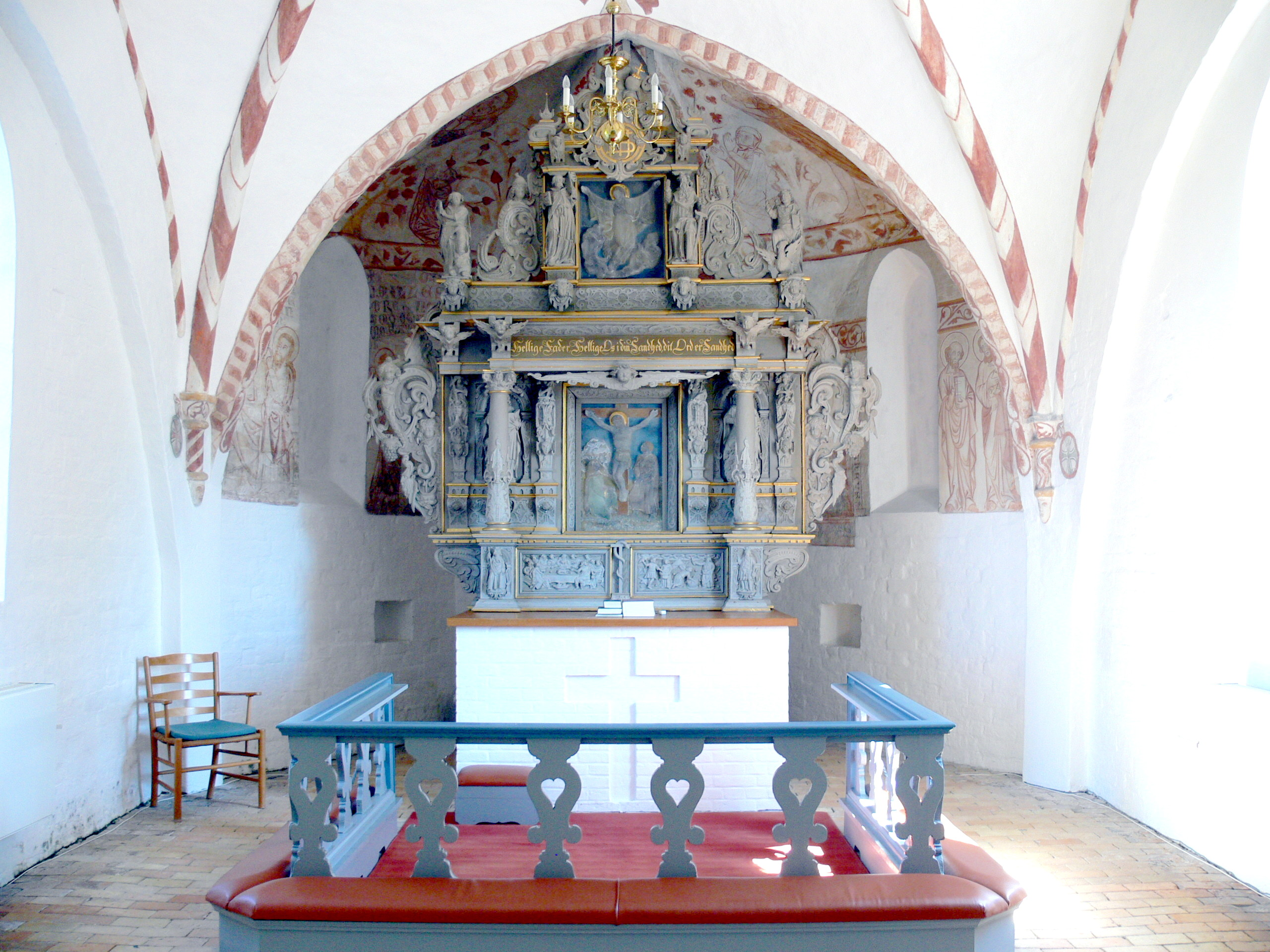
Jørgen Ringnis' altarpiece in Nørre Alslev Church.

== Births ==
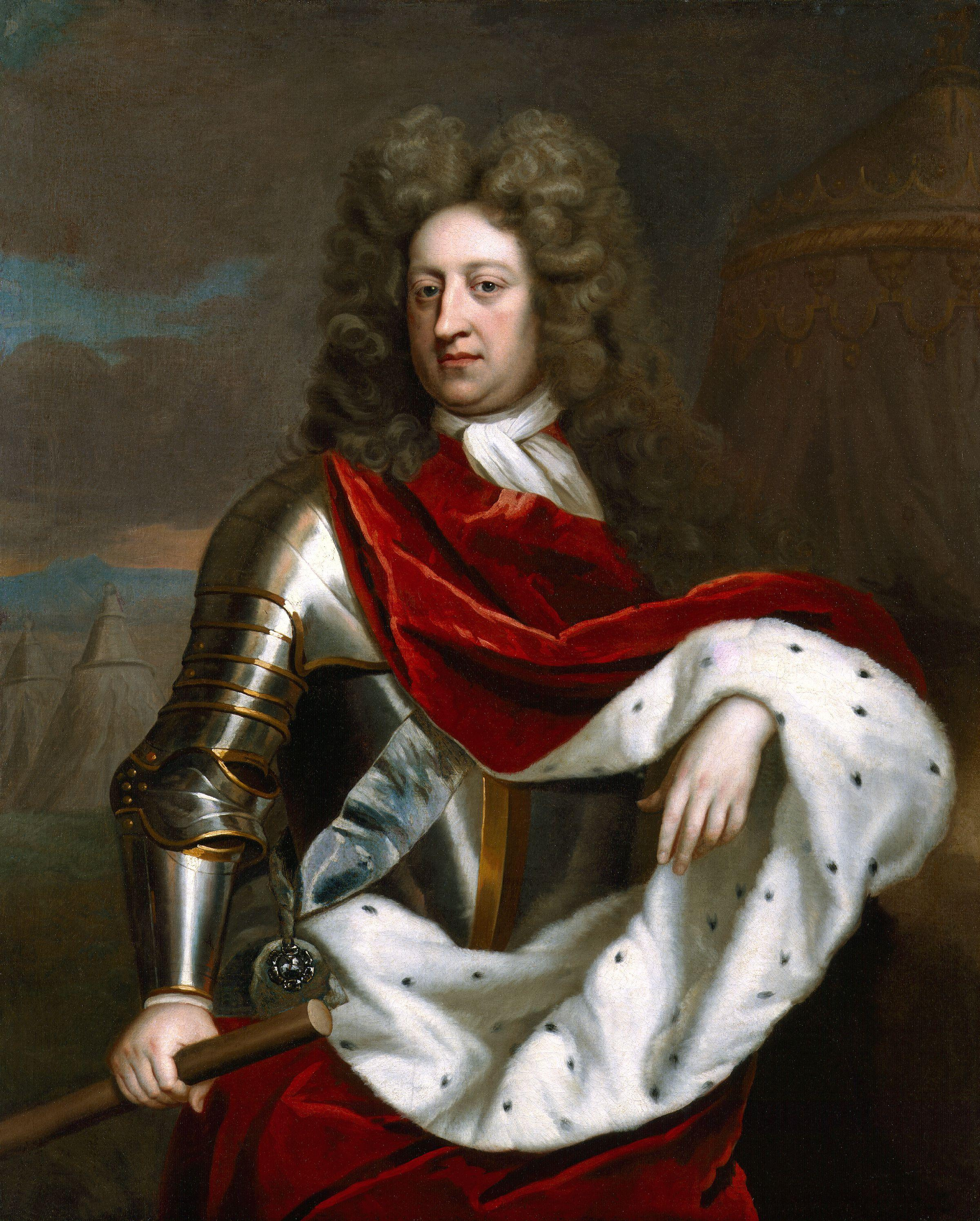
Prince George of Denmark.

- 2 April – Prince George of Denmark, husband of Queen Anne (died 1708 in England)

== Deaths ==
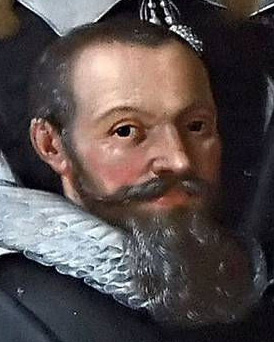
Jacob Madsen.

- 21 May – Jacob Madsen, merchant (born 1597)
