= 1641 in Denmark =

The following is a list of events that occurred in the year 1641 in Denmark.

== Incumbents ==
- Monarch – Christian IV
- Steward of the Realm – Corfitz Ulfeldt

== Events ==
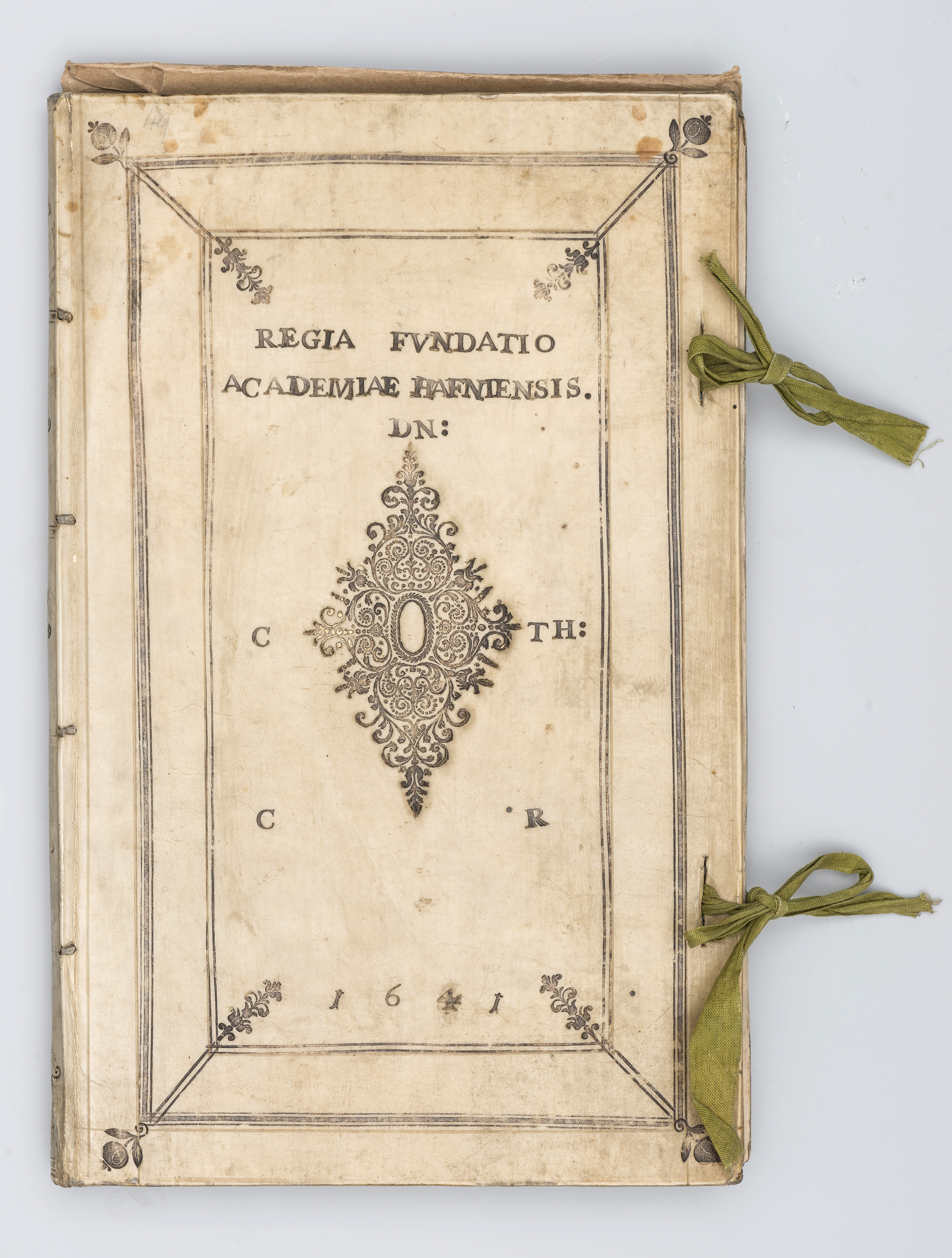
The 1641 Statutes of the University of Copenhagen.

- 18 March – The first diplomatic relations between Denmark-Norway and Portugal are established when Portuguese diplomats Francisco de Sousa Coutinho and António Moniz de Carvalho are sent to Copenhagen. Christian IV chose not to offer the diplomats a formal audience as he did not wish to compromise the neutrality of Denmark-Norway in the Spain as part of the Restoration War.
- 9 November – Maren Spliid, probably the best known alleged victim of the persecution of witches in Denmark, is burned.

=== Undated ===
- A new set of statues for the University of Copenhagen are issued.
- Hans Ulrik Gyldenløve is appointed as lensmand [bailiff] of the three castles, the Kronborg, Frederiksborg and Abrahamstrup (now the Jægerspris Castle).
- Christian IV starts the construction of Roskilde Kongevej (completed in 1642).
- Corfitz Ulfeldt is appointed as Steward of the Realm.
- Jacob Madsen becomes mayor of Copenhagen.

== Culture ==
=== Architecture ===
- Christian IV's Chapel at Roskilde Cathedral is completed by Hans van Steenwinckel the Younger (finishing the work started by his brother Lorenz van Steenwinckel).

=== Art ===
- Altarpiece of Maribo Cathedral.
- The pulpit of Øster Snede Church.
- A chalice created by Klaus Christensen (Odense) is presented to Viby Church by Knud Ulfeld til Urup (1600-46) in commemoration of his wife Anne Lykke of Hverringe (1595-1641).

== Births ==
Full date missing

- Frederik Giedde, admiral (died 1717)

== Deaths ==
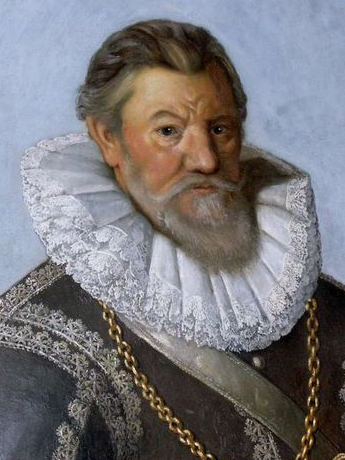
Claus Daa

- 30 March – Claus Daa, admiral and landowner (born 1579)
- 16 September – Rigborg Brockenhuus, noblewoman (born 1579).
- 9 November – Maren Spliid, alleged witch (born c. 1600)
- 26 November – Hedwig of Denmark, princess (born 1581)

Full date missing

- Anne Lykke, noblewoman and landowner (born 1595).
- Rigborg Brockenhuus, lady-in-waiting (born 1579)

== Publications ==
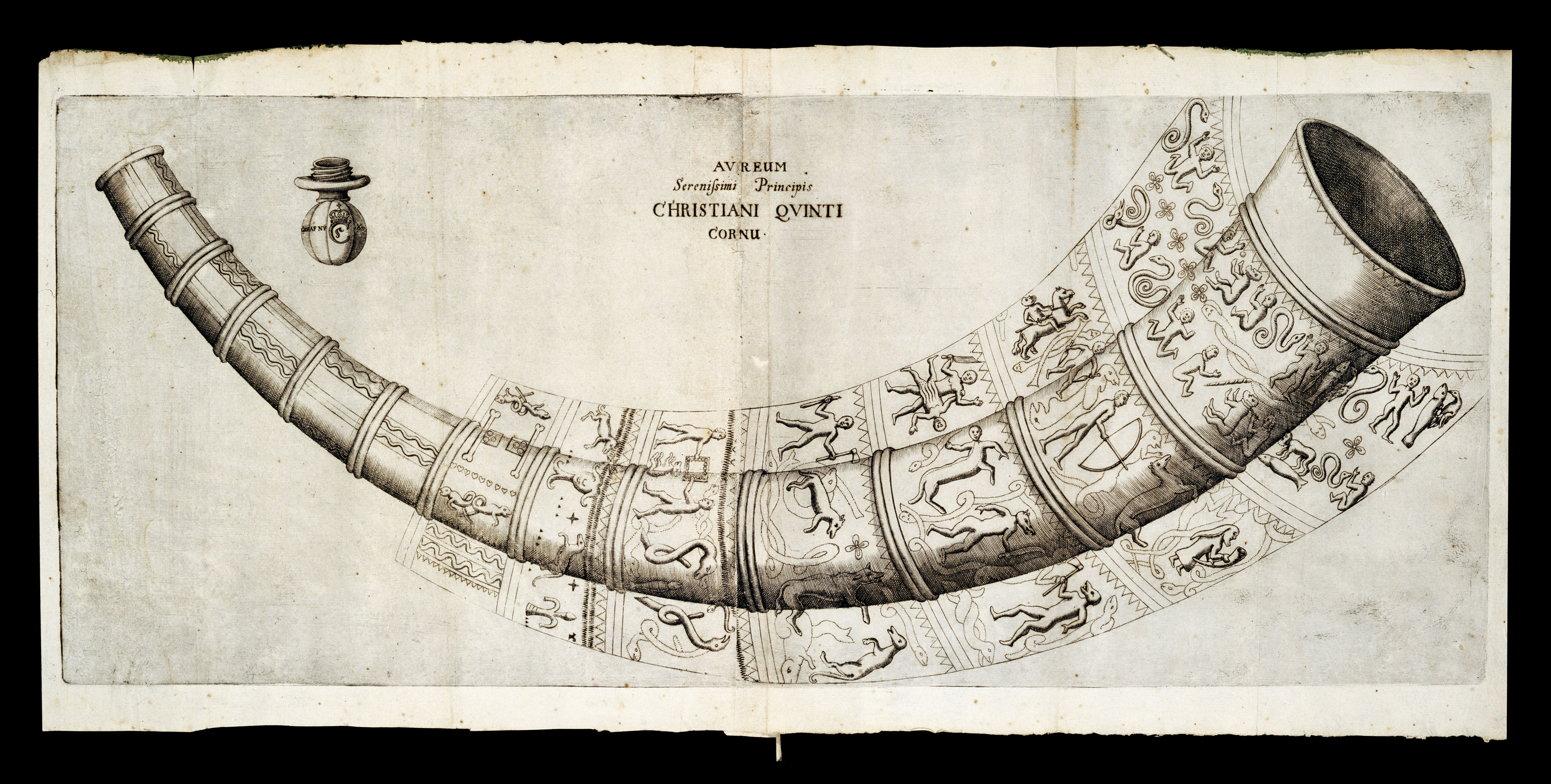
Ole Worm's illustration of the longer of the two Goldens Horns in De aureo cornu, 1641.

- Ole Worm: De aureo cornu
