= 1651 in Norway =

- Centuries: 16th; 17th; 18th; 19th
- Decades: 1630s; 1640s; 1650s; 1660s; 1670s
- See also: 1651 in Denmark; List of years in Norway

Events in the year 1651 in Norway.

== Incumbents ==
- Monarch: Frederick III.

== Events ==
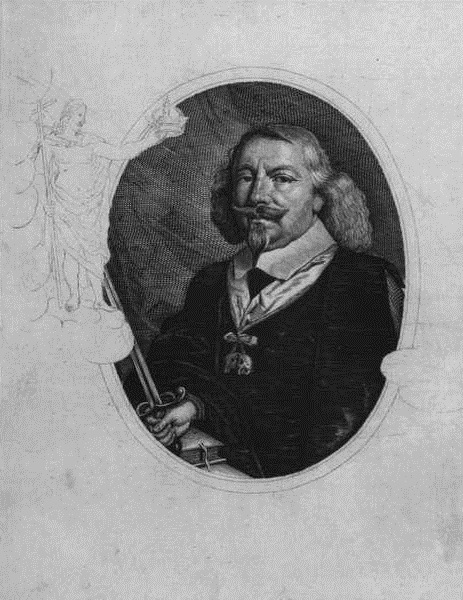
Gregers Krabbe

- May - Hannibal Sehested was sentenced to resigning as Governor-General of Norway and surrendering all his private property in Norway to the crown.
- 29 July - Gregers Krabbe was appointed Governor-General of Norway.
- 1 December - The Vardø witch trials starts.

== Arts and literature ==
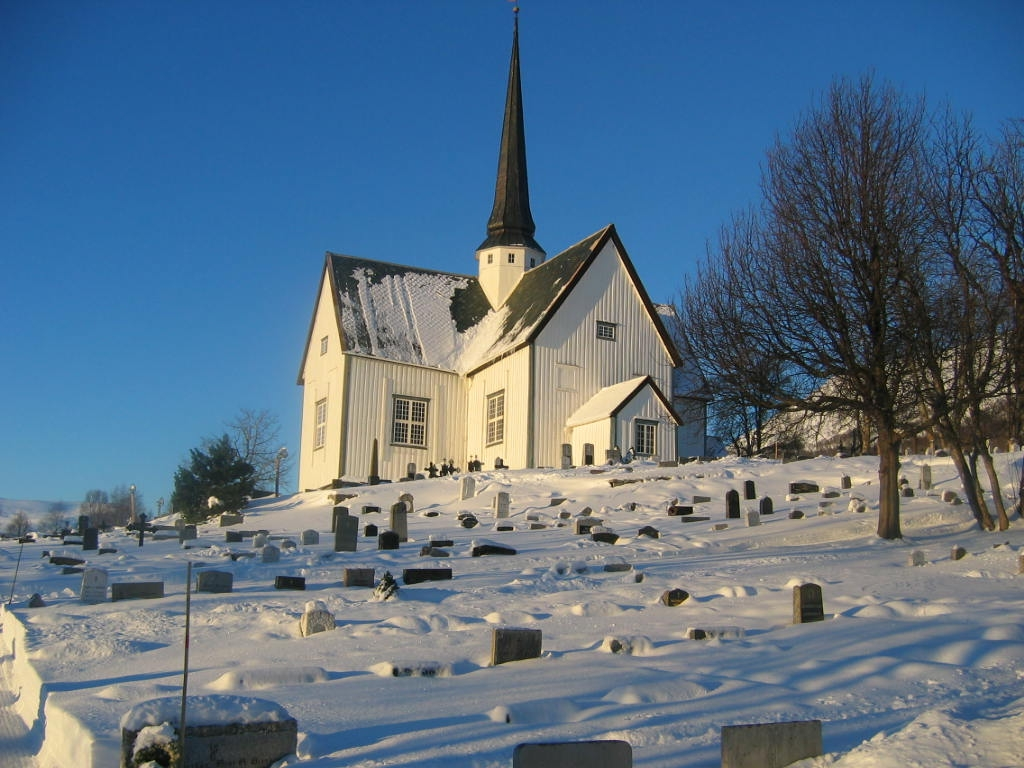
Oppdal Church

- Oppdal Church was built.

== Deaths ==
- 9 February - Herman Krefting, ironworks pioneer (born 1592).
- 22 June - Daniel Knudsen Bildt, military officer (born 1602).
