= 1646 in Norway =

- Centuries: 16th; 17th; 18th; 19th
- Decades: 1620s; 1630s; 1640s; 1650s; 1660s
- See also: 1646 in Denmark; List of years in Norway

Events in the year 1646 in Norway:

== Incumbents ==
- Monarch: Christian IV

== Events ==
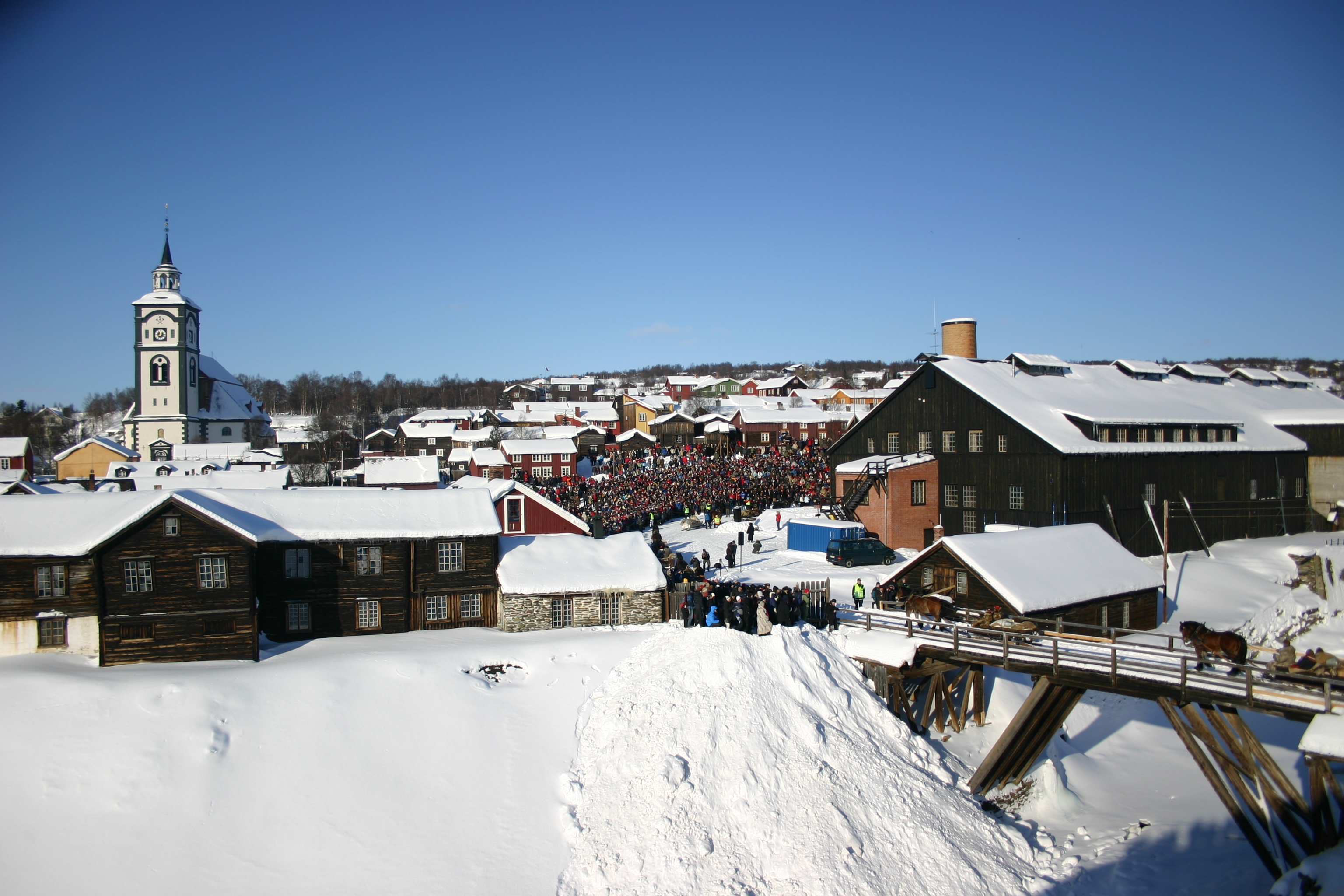
Røros

- 18 July - The Norwegian nobility is bestowed the neck and hand privilege. The privilege allowed nobels to catch, prosecute and pass judgment on criminals.
- The mining community (bergstad) of Røros is founded.
