= 1638 in Norway =

- Centuries: 16th; 17th; 18th; 19th
- Decades: 1610s; 1620s; 1630s; 1640s; 1650s
- See also: 1638 in Denmark; List of years in Norway

Events from the year 1638 in Norway.

== Incumbents ==
- Monarch: Christian IV.

== Births ==
- Mats de Tonsberg, civil servant and timber trader (died 1705).
- Ulrik Frederik Gyldenløve, Governor-general of Norway during the reign of Frederik III, and Christian V from 1664 to 1699 (died 1704).
