= 1645 in Norway =

- Centuries: 16th; 17th; 18th; 19th
- Decades: 1620s; 1630s; 1640s; 1650s; 1660s
- See also: 1645 in Denmark; List of years in Norway

Events in the year 1645 in Norway.

== Incumbents ==
- Monarch: Christian IV.

== Events ==
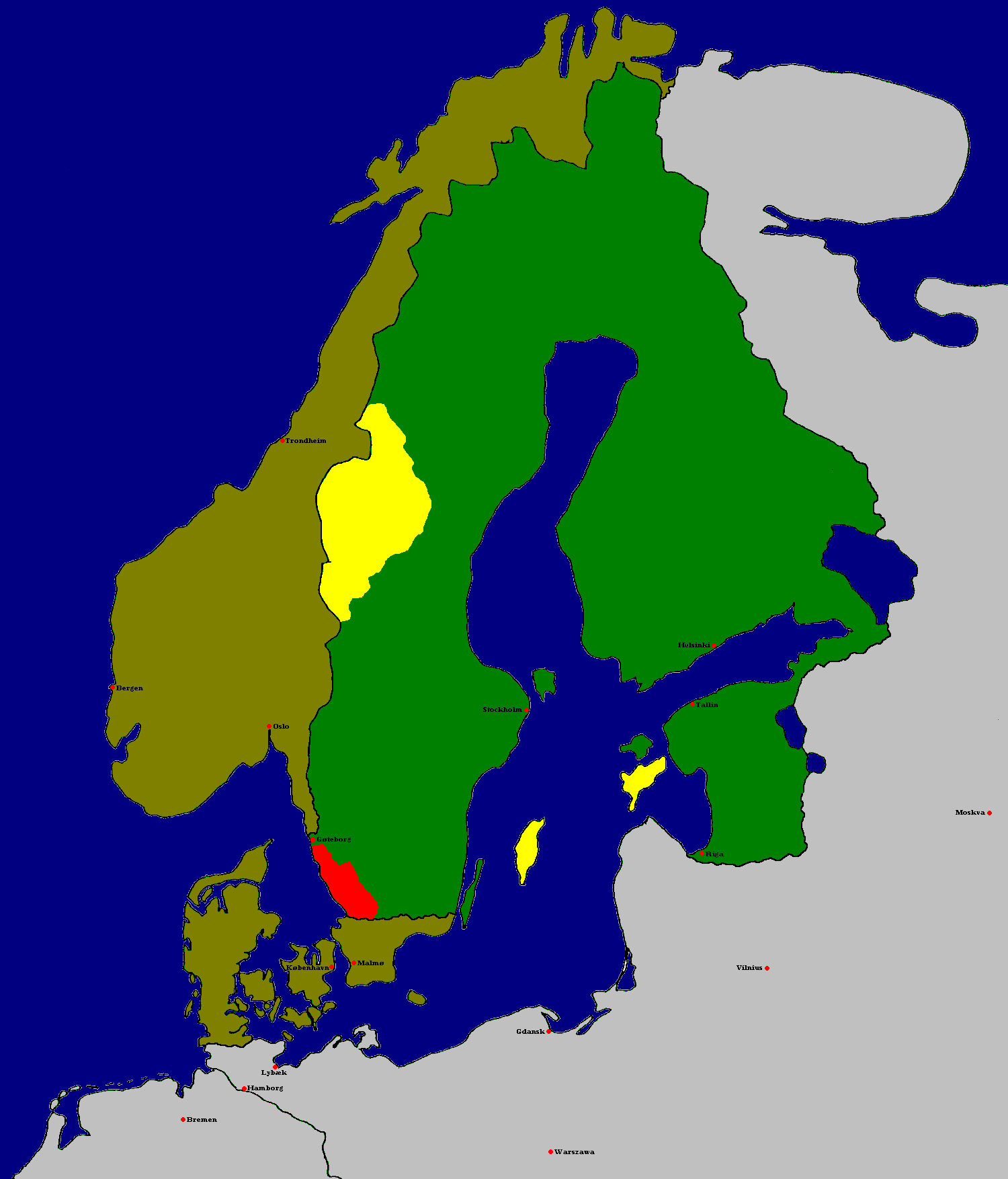
The Treaty of Brömsebro. In yellow; Denmark ceded the Norwegian provinces of Jemtland and Herjedalen and Baltic Sea islands of Gotland and Ösel to Sweden.

- Norwegian troops fought in the Battle of Vänersborg.
- 13 August - The Treaty of Brömsebro resulted in the ceding of the Norwegian provinces of Jemtland and Herjedalen to Sweden.
