= 1643 in Norway =

- Centuries: 16th; 17th; 18th; 19th
- Decades: 1620s; 1630s; 1640s; 1650s; 1660s
- See also: 1643 in Denmark; List of years in Norway

Events in the year 1643 in Norway.

== Incumbents ==
- Monarch: Christian IV.

== Events ==
- 12 December - The Hannibal War starts.

=== Full date unknown ===
- The first professional book publisher to use printing press in Norway is established in Christiania.

== Arts and literature ==
- The first printed book in Norway; "Allmanach paa det aar efter Jesu Christi Fødsel 1644" is printed and published for the first time.
