= 1644 in Norway =

- Centuries: 16th; 17th; 18th; 19th
- Decades: 1620s; 1630s; 1640s; 1650s; 1660s
- See also: 1644 in Denmark; List of years in Norway

Events in the year 1644 in Norway.

== Incumbents ==
- Monarch: Christian IV.

== Events ==
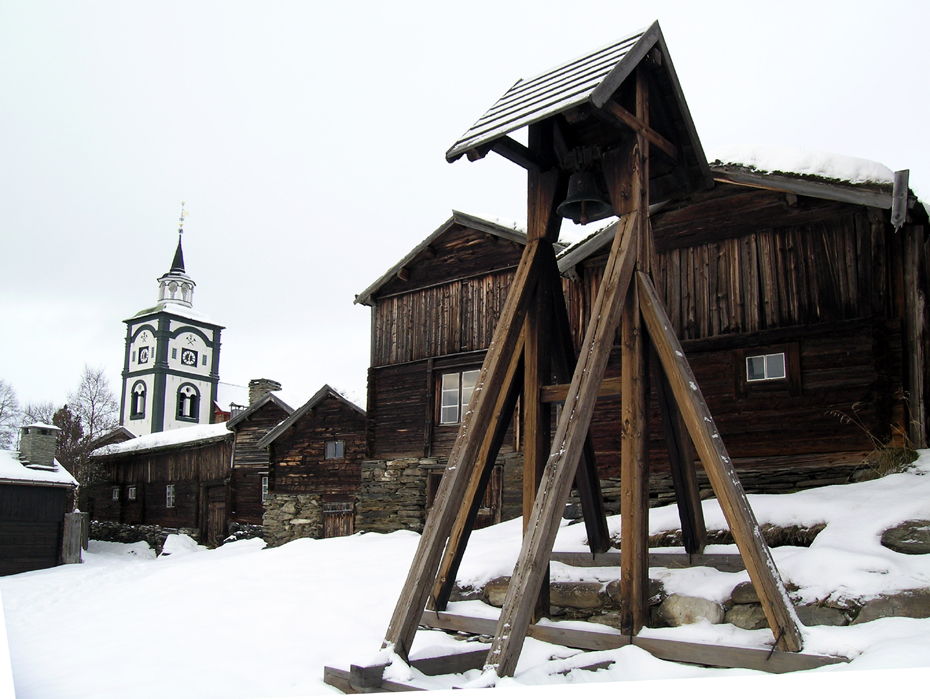
Bell from Røros Copper Works

- Røros Copper Works is established.
- 22 December – Norwegian troops fought in the Battle of Bysjön.
