= 1639 in Norway =

- Centuries: 16th; 17th; 18th; 19th
- Decades: 1610s; 1620s; 1630s; 1640s; 1650s
- See also: 1639 in Denmark; List of years in Norway

Events in the year 1639 in Norway.

== Incumbents ==
- Monarch: Christian IV.

== Arts and literature ==
=== Architecture ===
- The Cathedral Hellig Trefoldigheds Kirke in Christiania completed (burned down in 1686).

== Births ==
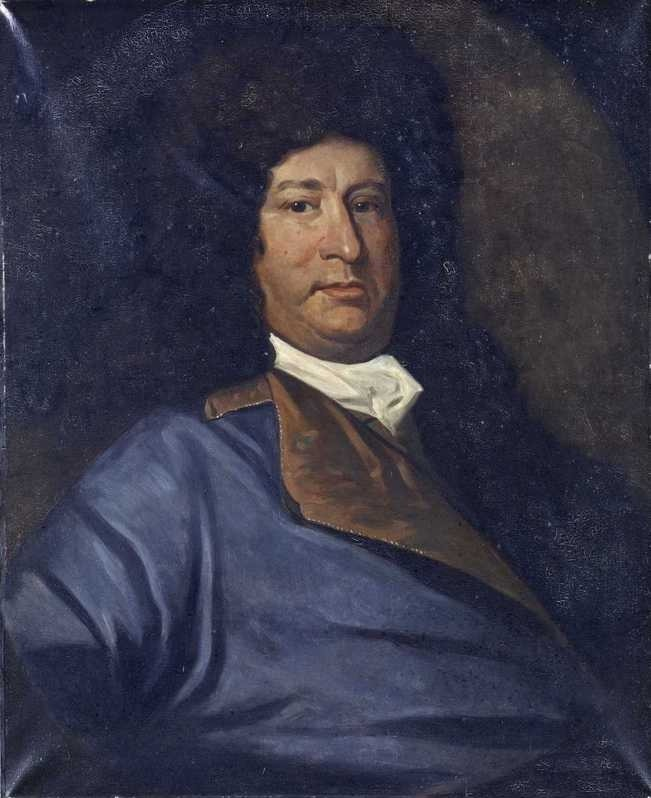
Christian Stockfleth

- Christian Stockfleth, civil servant (died 1704).

== Deaths ==
- 1 June – Niels Simonssøn Glostrup, bishop.
