= 1642 in Norway =

- Centuries: 17th; 18th; 19th
- Decades: 1620s; 1630s; 1640s; 1650s; 1660s
- See also: 1642 in Denmark; List of years in Norway

Events in the year 1642 in Norway.

== Incumbents ==
- Monarch: Christian IV.

== Events ==
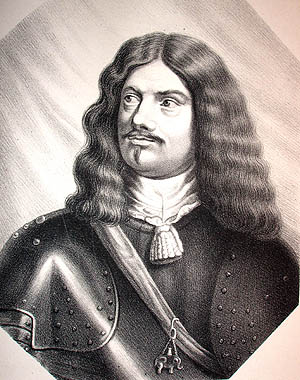
Hannibal Sehested

- April - Hannibal Sehested was appointed Governor-General of Norway, one of the most important person to hold the position.

== Deaths ==
- 8 January – Niels Toller, merchant (born c. 1592).
