= 1652 in Denmark =

- Decades: 1630s; 1640s; 1650s; 1660s; 1670s
- See also: Other events of 1652; List of years in Denmark

Events from the year 1652 in Denmark.

== Incumbents ==
- Monarch – Frederick III
- Steward of the Realm – Joachim Gersdorff

== Culture ==
=== Art ===
- Lorentz Jørgensen completes the altarpiece in St. Nicholas' Church in Køge.
- Erik Brockenhuus of Lerbæk Manor presents a chalice created by Claus Christensen (Odense) to Hover Church.
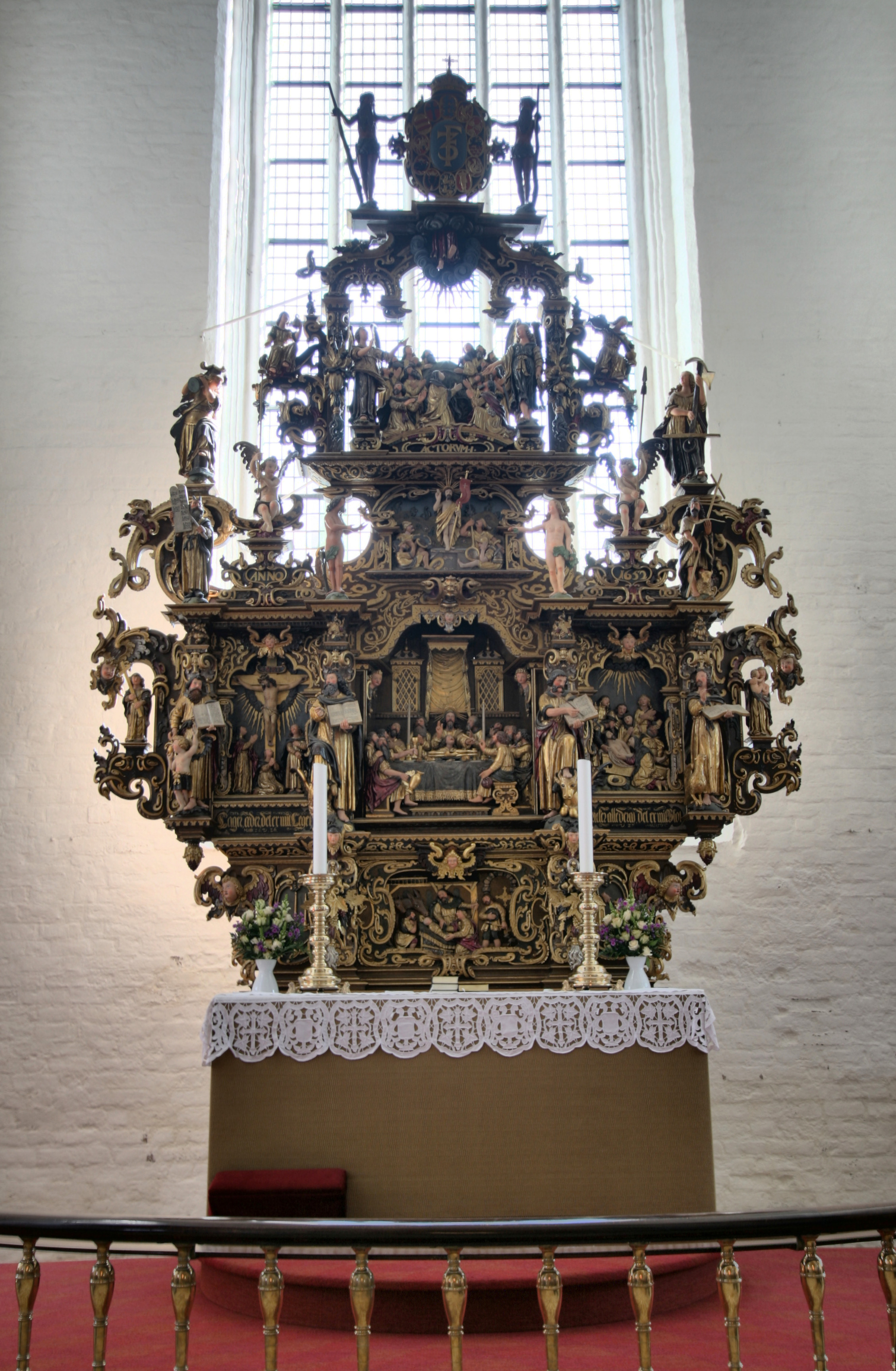
Lorentz Jørgensen's altarpiece in St. Nicholas' Church in Køge

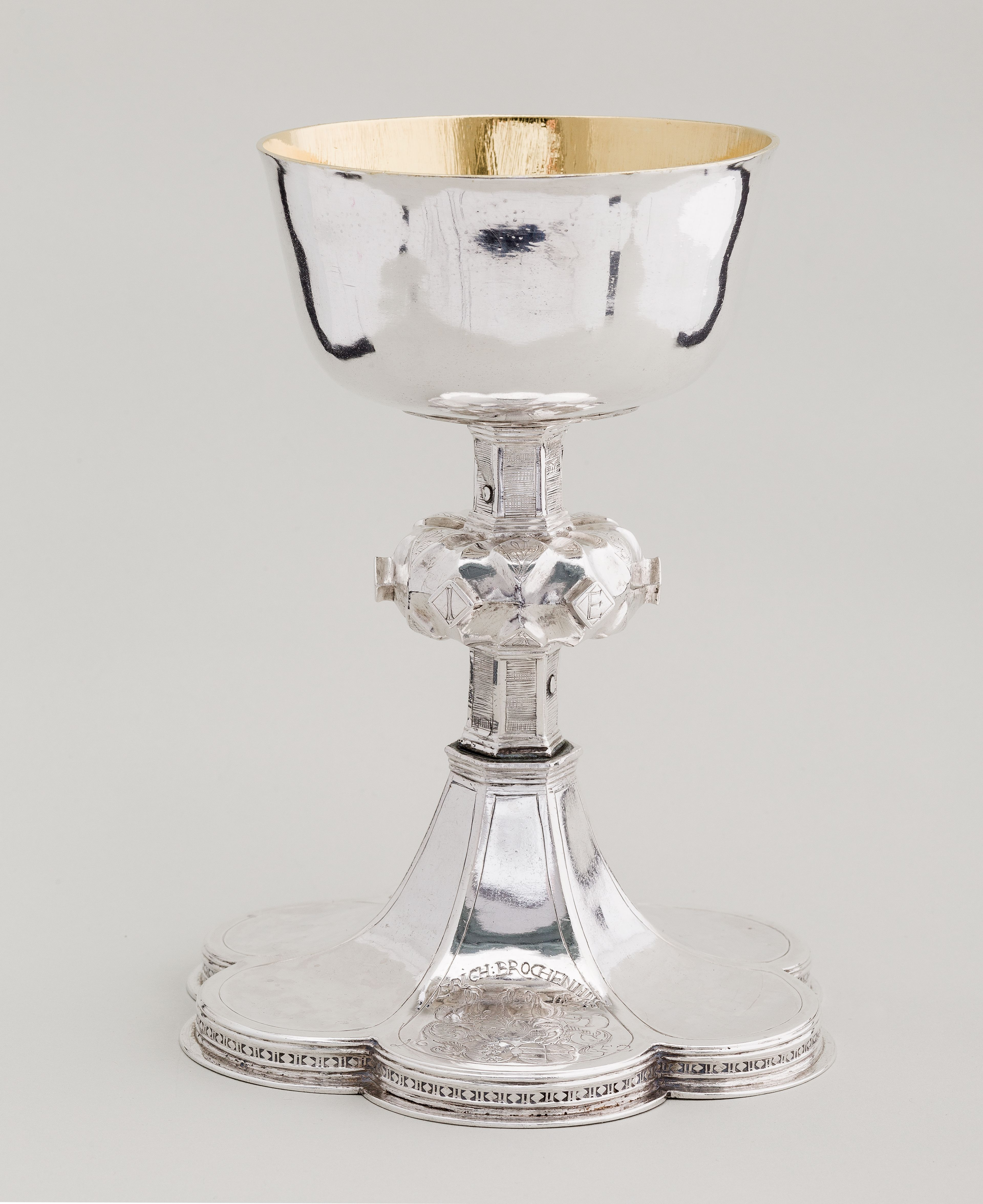
Chalice from Blåhøj Church.

== Deaths ==
- 19 April – Jesper Brochmand, theologian and Bishop of Zealand (born 1585)

Undated

- Jørgen Ringnis, woodcarver
