= 1636 in Norway =

- Centuries: 16th; 17th; 18th; 19th
- Decades: 1610s; 1620s; 1630s; 1640s; 1650s
- See also: 1636 in Denmark; List of years in Norway

Events in the year 1636 in Norway.

== Incumbents ==
- Monarch: Christian IV.

== Events ==
- 8 October - Albert Andriessen Bradt emigrated to New Netherland, one of the earliest Norwegian settlers of the Dutch colony.
- Queen Christina expulse all non-taxpaying Finns (Forest Finns) from Värmland and Dalsland. Most moved across the Norwegian border into Solør, establishing a colony there.

== Births ==
=== Full date unknown ===
- Jens Toller Rosenheim, nobleman and jurist (died 1690).
- Christian Jørgensen Kruse, government official (died 1699).
