= 1648 in Norway =

- Centuries: 16th; 17th; 18th; 19th
- Decades: 1620s; 1630s; 1640s; 1650s; 1660s
- See also: 1648 in Denmark; List of years in Norway

Events in the year 1648 in Norway.

== Incumbents ==
- Monarch: Christian IV (until 28 February); Frederick III. (starting 6 July)

== Events ==
- 6 July - Prince Frederick was accepted as his father's successor, and became king of both Denmark and Norway, as King Frederick III.
- 12 August - King Frederick III was hailed as King of Norway in Christiania.
- Lauritz Galte was ennobled, and given the noble family name Galtung.

== Births ==
=== Exact date missing ===
- Johannes Skraastad, wood carver (died 1700).

== Deaths ==
- 28 February – Christian IV, king of Denmark and Norway since 1588 (born 1577).
