= 1647 in Norway =

- Centuries: 16th; 17th; 18th; 19th
- Decades: 1620s; 1630s; 1640s; 1650s; 1660s
- See also: 1647 in Denmark; List of years in Norway

Events in the year 1647 in Norway.

== Incumbents ==
- Monarch: Christian IV.

== Events ==
- 17 January – Postvesenet is established.
- 2 June – Crown-Prince Christian dies, leading to a succession crisis in Denmark–Norway.

== Arts and literature ==
- Sjernarøy Church was built.

== Births ==
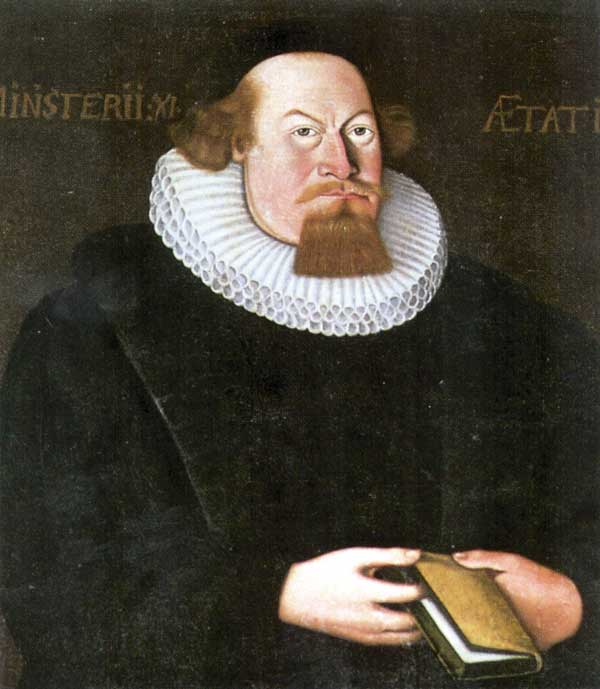
Petter Dass

=== Full date unknown ===
- Petter Dass, poet (died 1707).
