= Povel Huitfeldt =

Danish statesman (1520–1592)

Povel Ottesen Huitfeldt
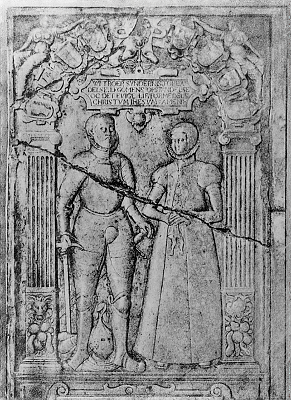
- Huitfeldt's gravestone in St. Nikolai church, Halmstad depicting him and his wife Margrethe Breide.

Governor-general of Norway
- In office 1572–1577
- Monarch: Frederick II
- Preceded by: Christen Munk
- Succeeded by: Ludvig Munk

Personal details
- Born: c. 1520
- Died: September 21, 1592 aged 72 Tryggevælde, Denmark

Povel Ottesen Huitfeldt (c. 1520 – 21 September 1592) was a Danish-Norwegian governor-general of Norway.

== Early life ==
Povel Huitfeldt was born around 1520 (Note: The exact year and place of birth are unknown; the date of birth is approximated from later records.) to Otte Clausen Huitfeldt (who died between 1517 and 1529) and Barbara Eriksdatter Blaa (who died in 1558 at the earliest). He was the youngest of four boys, including Christoffer Huitfeldt (c. 1501–1559) and Peder Huitfeldt (who died in 1584).

Around 1548, Huitfeldt relocated to Bergen to join his brother Christoffer, who was serving as a bailiff in the Bergenhus Fortress at the time. In the summers of 1552–54 and over the winter of 1554–55, Povel served as King Christian III's representative to Iceland, an officially Catholic nation that had been resisting the kingdom's forceful efforts to convert them to Lutheranism, which had become the Dano–Norwegian state religion following the Protestant reformation. Accompanied by a military force, Povel successfully squashed what remained of Catholic resistance in Iceland after the 1550 execution of their bishop, Jón Arason.

On 4 February 1554, Huitfeldt married Margrethe Breide, the daughter of Hans Breide and Thale Emmiksdatter. She was a lady-in-waiting of the king's wife, Queen Dorothea.

Between 1556–59, Huitfeldt served as sheriff at Copenhagen Castle. Upon Christian III's death, the queen lent him Koldinghus, the last of the ancient royal castles in Jutland, for the period from 1559 to 1563.

== Seven Years' War ==
Following the breakdown of the Kalmar Union early in the 16th century, war broke out between its two main constituents, Denmark–Norway and Sweden, on 13 August 1563. In the ensuing Northern Seven Years' War, Povel Huitfeldt was put in charge of Halmstad, a port town in the then-Danish province of Halland, which he held during a siege by Swedish forces in the autumn of 1563.

== Governor-general of Norway ==
=== Background ===
Until 1572, the position of governor-general was only symbolic, and Norway lacked a central government altogether. As such, there was nothing linking the king in Copenhagen to his Norwegian subjects. Each feudal lord (lensherre) was the highest authority in his district and was responsible only to the king. However, the war with Sweden highlighted the strategic weaknesses of this approach; the fact that Norway lacked its own standing army had made the invasion of its territories by even small Swedish forces possible, leading to, among others, the burning of Hamar Cathedral and the destruction of the bishop's fortified palace, Hamarhus.

=== Appointment ===
Following the war, Huitfeldt was dispatched to Norway and assumed the role of feudal lord of Brunla Manor in Larvik from 1570 to 1574. In April 1572, he was also appointed as the feudal lord for Akershus and Tromsø.

On May 10, 1572, Huitfeldt was appointed as the newfangled governor-general of Norway (stattholder). As governor-general, he was responsible for the courts, the supervision of the church and clergy, the resolution of complaints from the various provinces under his jurisdiction, and the management of royal property, which consisted of traditionally owned crown lands in addition to the large amounts of church land that had been confiscated during the Reformation.

He also oversaw feudal lords, with the aim of preventing abuses of power and ensuring faithful and prompt collection of the king's taxes. Simultaneously, he was designated as a judge at lagtings taking place in Oslo, Bergen, and Trondheim. The latter two cities were where Huitfeldt commuted to for administrative meetings, though in 1575 he was granted an exemption by the king from traveling to Bergen due to health issues.

Given his control over the judiciary, it is likely that Huitfeldt played a part in Chancellor Johan Venstermand's ouster in the autumn of the same year.

=== Impact ===
Huitfeldt struggled to exert control over local officials; Ludvig Munk and others persisted in their misuse of tax collections and harsh suppression of peasant resistance, particularly in Trøndelag. Munk would later go on to succeed Huitfeldt as governor-general in 1577.

In church administration, Huitfeldt's efforts yielded better outcomes. In 1574, he appointed three officials to oversee the collection of church tithes and manage the church economy. They also compiled cadastral surveys (jordebøker) that provided comprehensive land registers delineating the metes-and-bounds of ecclesiastical property in Norway. These compilations, entitled Povel Huitfeldt stiftsbok, were published for the Diocese of Oslo in 1575 and for the Diocese of Hamar in 1577. While the originals have been lost, a 1601 copy has been preserved, encompassing additions and corrections up to and including the year 1600. A jordebøker was also prepared for the Diocese of Stavanger, but it has since been lost. This data collection was discontinued after Huitfeldt's tenure as governor-general ended in 1577, resulting in the control of the economy reverting to local church officials and bailiffs.

Huitfeldt was an avid proponent of education, with the city of Oslo purportedly surpassing Bergen, at the time the largest city in Norway, in terms of educational establishments.

In 1576, Huitfeldt chaired a meeting in Skien between farmers and delegates of the clergy in Stavanger county to mediate a conflict regarding tithes. The outcome of the meeting was an agreement that farmers would retain a quarter of the tithe traditionally allocated for the poor, but in return would have to contribute funds to support students at Stavanger Cathedral School. The accord was ratified by the king and adopted as national policy.

== Retirement and death ==
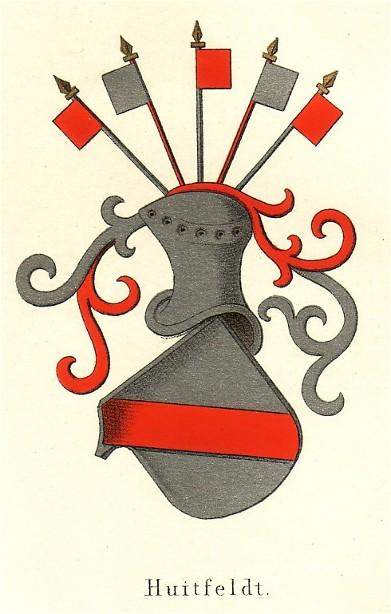
Coat of arms of the Huitfeldt family, depicted by Anders Thiset, 1887.

Povel Huitfeldt stepped down from all roles in 1577 due to health complications and the arduous travel conditions in Norway, characterized by inadequate roads, perilous bridges, and steep cliffs. Post-retirement, he primarily resided in Halland, where he owned property.

From 1581 onward, he held the title of feudal lord of Tromsø.

On 21 September 1592, Huitfeldt died at Tryggevælde Manor during a visit to his nephew, chancellor and historian Arild Huitfeldt. He was interred at Halmstad Church in modern-day Sweden.

== Bibliography ==
- Dansk Biografisk Leksikon, vol. 6. Copenhagen: Gyldendal, 1979-84.
- Gjerset, Knut (1915) History of the Norwegian People, Volumes I & II (New York City: The MacMillan Company)
- Gyldendal og Politikens Danmarkshistorie, vol. 7. Copenhagen: Gyldendal and Politiken, 1988-93.
- S. Kolsrud (red.): Oslo og Hamar bispedømmes jordebok 1574–77, 1929
- O. A. Johnsen: biografi i NBL1, vol. 6, 1934
- H. Larsen: Povel Huitfeldt, norsk stattholder 1572–77, h.oppg. UiO, 1936
- P. Colding: Studier i Danmarks politiske historie i slutningen af Christian IIs og begyndelsen af Frederik IIs tid', København 1939
- S. Supphellen: “Opprettinga av ein norsk statthaldarinstitusjon i 1572”, i HT, vol. 58, 1979, s. 159–175
- Ø. Rian: Den aristokratiske fyrstestaten, vol. 2 i Danmark-Norge 1380–1814, 1997
