= Hans Hansen Lilienskiold =

Norwegian civil servant (c. 1650 – 1703)

- Born: c.1650
- Died: 1703 (aged 52–53)
- Occupations: jurist, government official, civil servant, and land owner
- Notable work: Speculum Boreale (1699)

Hans Hansen Lilienskiold (c.1650 – 1703) was a Norwegian jurist, government official, civil servant, and land owner. He was a member of the Lilienskiold noble family and served as County Governor of Finnmark. He is particularly remembered as an author for his works on the topography and culture of Finnmark.

== Biography ==
Lilienskiold was born in Bergen, Norway. He was the eldest of six in the family of Hans Hansen (Smidt) Lillienskiold (ca. 1610–1681) and Margrethe Jonasdatter (ca. 1624–1654). Hans Hansen Smidt had been born in Tønder, Denmark. He became a lawyer in Bergen in 1650 and later held various government commissions. He was County Governor of Bergenhus len (1667–1669) and Mayor of Bergen (1679–1681). Hans Hansen Smidt was ennobled with the surname Lillienschiold in 1676. He became quite wealthy and owned various properties including Losna-ætta on Losna in Sogn and part of Giskegodset in Sunnmøre. His family also became related to the noble family Svanenhielm through the marriage of his granddaughter Cecilia Christine Lillienschiold (1687–1749) to Morten de Svanenhielm (1690–1749) of Svanøy.

Hans Hansen Lilienskiold was enrolled at the University of Copenhagen in 1668. Later he toured various cities including Leipzig, Rome, and Paris on a journey lasting three and a half years. In 1672, he became a secretary at the Danish-Norwegian Counsellor in Stockholm. In 1673, Lilienskiold was appointed deputy judge of the Bergen District Court and the Gulating Court of Appeal (1673–1684). After the death of his father in 1681, Lilienskiold acquired the Hop farm on Askøy island and Sletten farm in Lindås. He served as County Governor of Finnmark from 1684. He was appointed district governor of Møre og Romsdal in 1702 never to accede because of illness. He died on 12 January 1703, in Copenhagen.

Lilienskiold wrote two volumes of travel records from his journey through Europe, two volumes of general history and three volumes of topographical and cultural depictions of Finnmark. His most notable work was titled Speculum Boreale (1699) which contained an early historical description of the Sami residents of Finnmark. The work also contained colored ink and watercolor drawings of landscapes, towns and people in the county.

== Selected works ==
- Reisejournal 1668–1670
- Reisejournal 1670 over en reise til Italia, Frankrike, Nederland og England
- Finnmarkens beskrivelse
- Trolldom og ugudelighet i 1600-tallets Finnmark
