= Christen Munk =

Danish born Governor-general of Norway and county governor

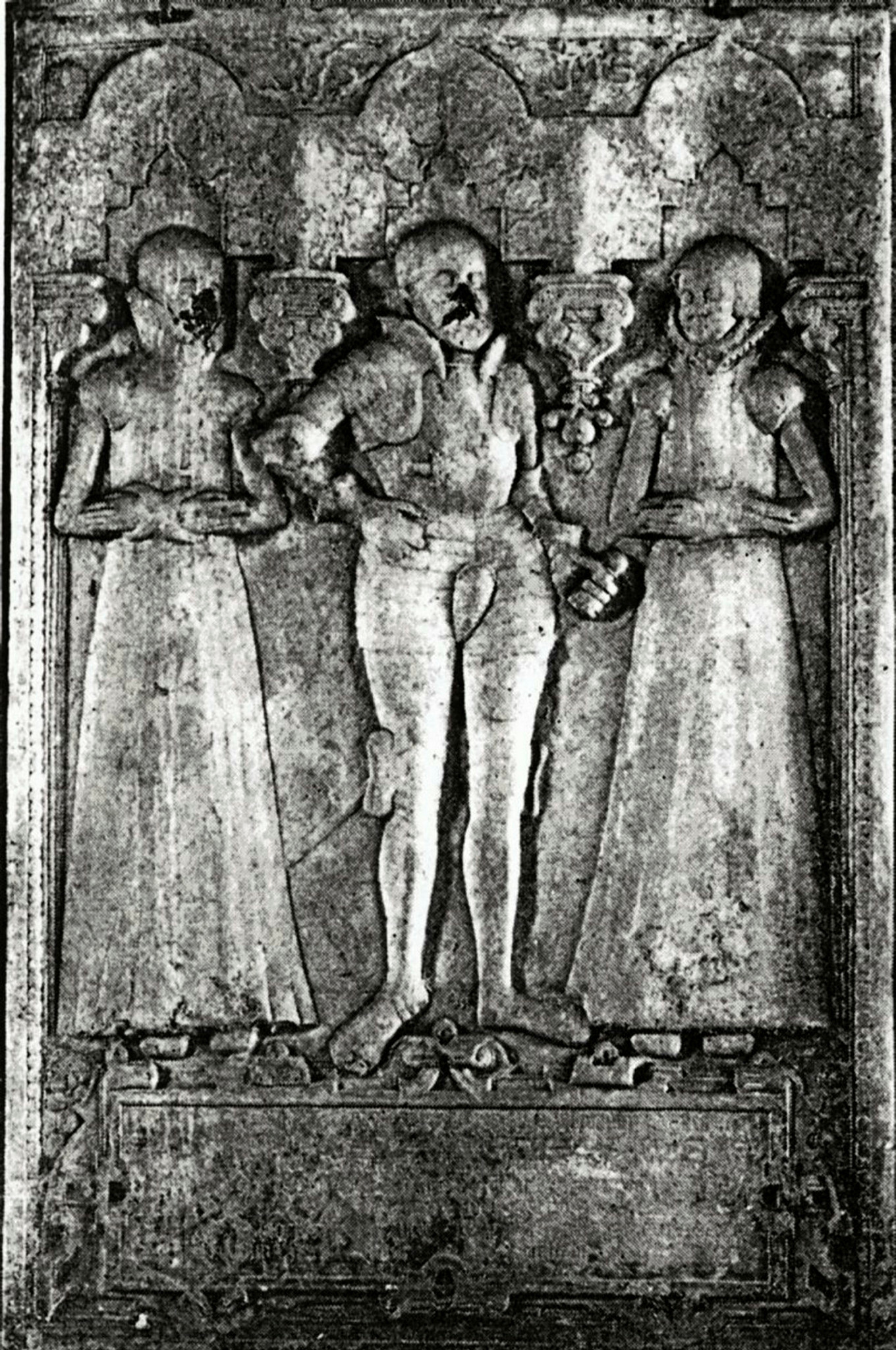
- Depiction of Munk and his wives Else Truidsdatter Ulfstand and Dorothea Mogensdatter in Aarhus Cathedral

1st Governor-general of Norway
- In office 1556–1572
- Monarchs: Christian III and Frederick II
- Succeeded by: Povel Huitfeldt

Personal details
- Born: 1520
- Died: July 5, 1579 (aged 58–59); Åkær, Odder Municipality, Denmark

Christen Munk (1520 – July 5, 1579) was a Danish born, Governor-general of Norway and county governor.

== Biography ==
He came from Danish nobility and was the son of Hans Munk (died 1535) and Maren Christensdatter Spend (died 1543). He started his career at the court of King Christian III of Denmark and Norway in Copenhagen, in Denmark, during 1548. Munk participated in the travel entourage of Princess Anna when she married in Saxony that year.

In 1549 he was appointed feudal overlord of Hamar in Norway, and eventually acquired the properties of a number of monasteries that had become royal property after the Reformation. In 1556, he became the Governor-general of Norway and feudal overlord of Akershus, a position he held until 1572. This statutory position was a precursor to the stewardship that was created and existed with some disruptions until 1814.

In 1558 he became feudal overlord of Sunnmøre. During the 1560s, Munk had control over Hamar County (i.e., len) and Akershus County while residing at Akershus Fortress. He added Værne Kloster in 1571, as well as Ingedal, Eidsberg and Rakkestad in Østfold. In addition, he controlled a number of other smaller territories for a shorter or longer period, among them Bratsberg and Gimsøy Abbey, Tønsberg County.

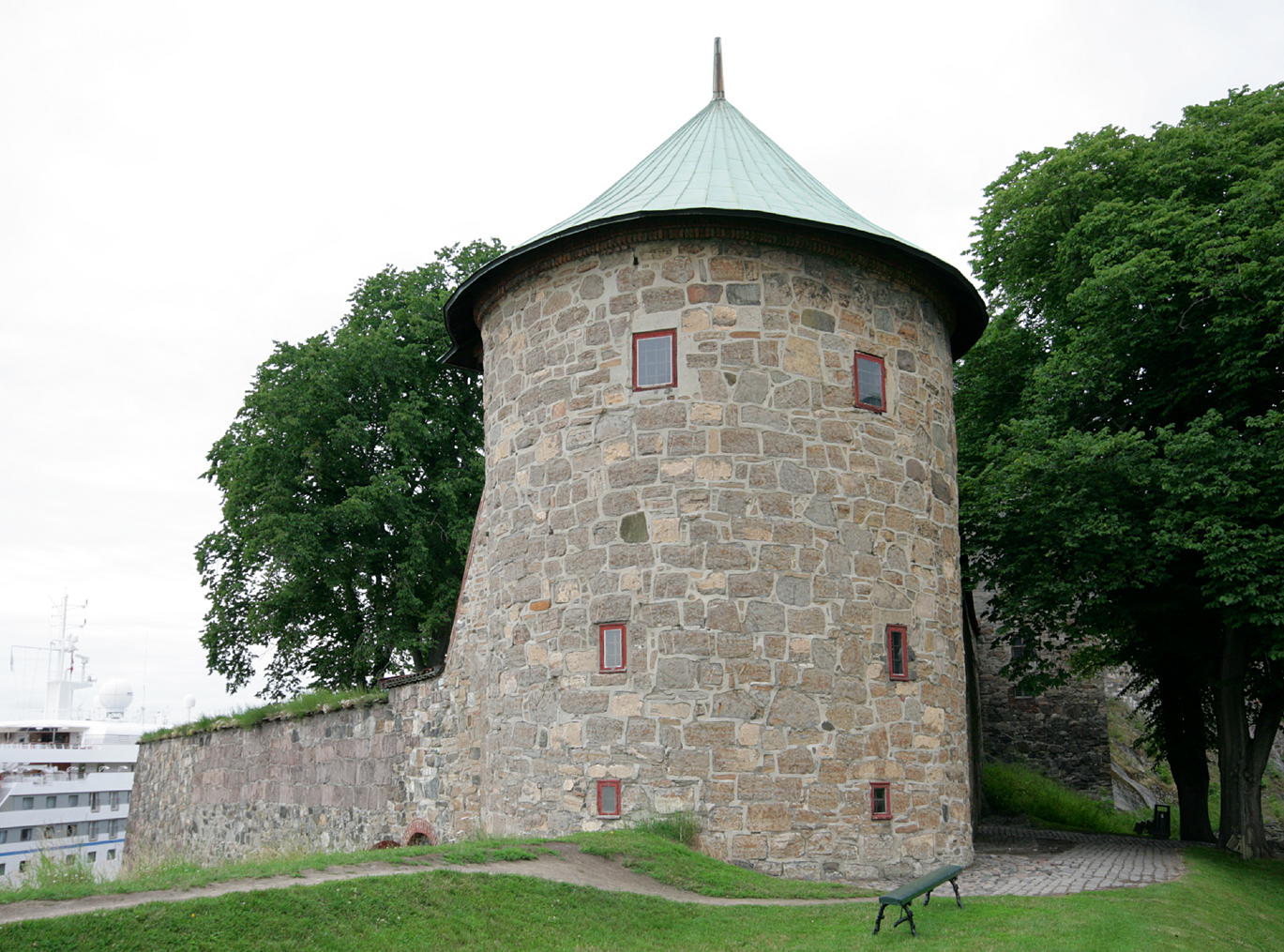
The former water tower at Akershus Fortress, which Munk had rebuilt into a cannon and gate tower in 1559

In 1567, Swedish troops moved against Akershus fortress during the Northern Seven Years' War and, in response to this threat, Munk also allowed Oslo to burn to prevent the Swedes from gaining a foothold in the city. A shortage of artillery and supplies caused the Swedes to withdraw after eight days. A few years later, Munk retaliated by sending troops into Värmland, Dalsland, and Västergötland in Sweden on raiding and plundering missions.

At Akershus Fortress, both Munk Pond (Munkedammen) and the Munk Tower (Munketårnet) are named after him. The Munk Tower was the medieval fortress's water tower, which he converted into a cannon and gate tower in 1559.

In 1572 Munk moved to Jutland, where he died in Aakjær seven years later.

== Other sources ==
- Gjerset, Knut (1915) History of the Norwegian People, Volume 2 (New York City, The Macmillan Company)
