= Elias Fiigenschoug =

- Born: c. 1600
- Died: c. 1660
- Occupation: Painter
- Years active: 17th century

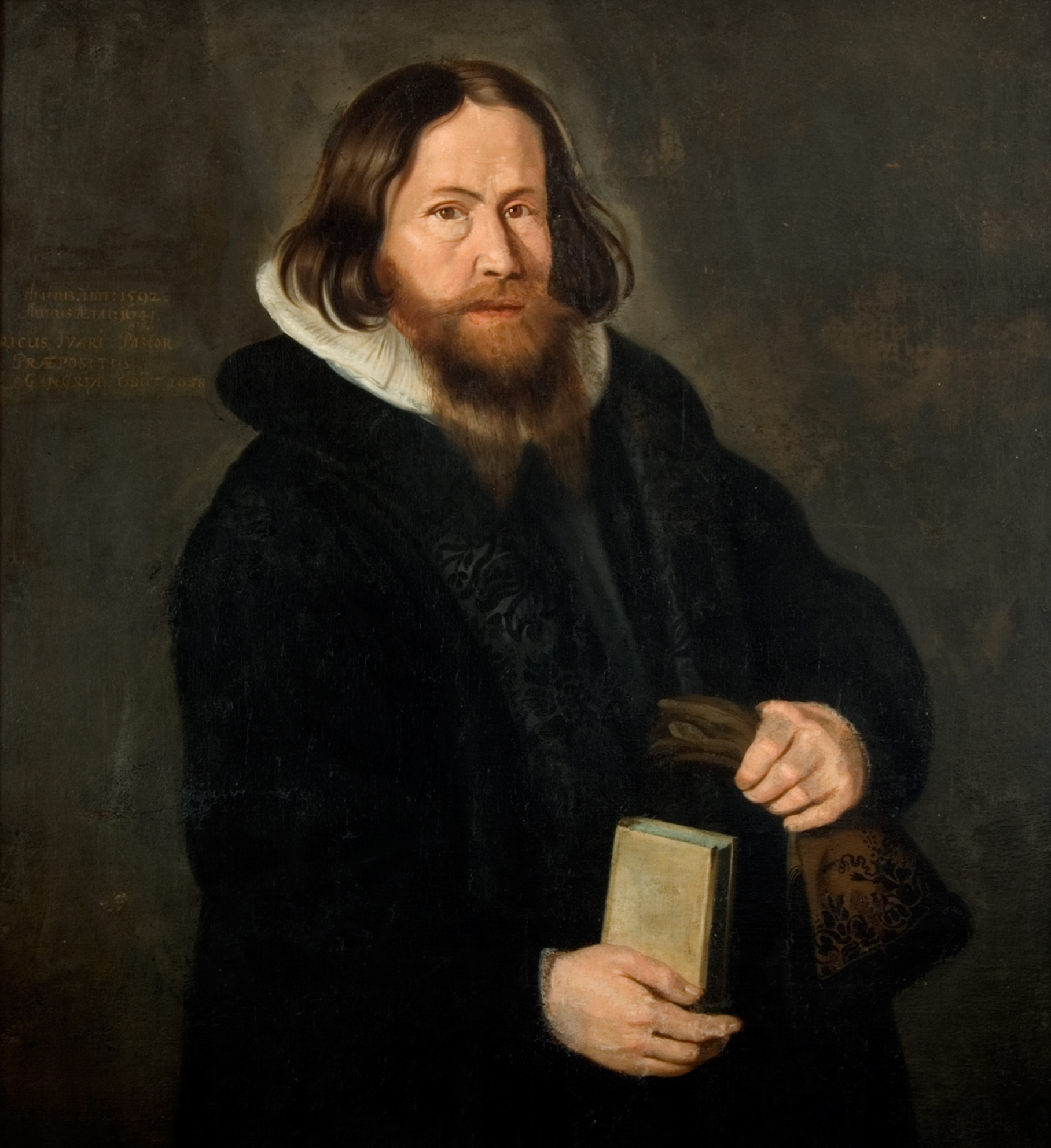
Fiigenschoug's portrait of Erik Iversen Nordal, priest in Leikanger parish from 1618 to 1658

Fiigenschoug's painting of Halsnøy Abbey (1656)

Elias Fiigenschoug (c. 1600 – c. 1660) was a 17th-century Norwegian Baroque portrait and landscape painter.

== Biography ==
Fiigenschoug worked in Bergen, Norway from about 1640 to 1660. He signed most of his work with characteristic EF. His oldest signed work is dated 1641, the last in 1657. Fiigenschoug had contact with artist circles in Amsterdam and was most probably educated in the Netherlands. In portraits he was primarily influenced by Dutch portraiture, in a sober style, with certain personal characteristics and a refined technique. He painted a number of portraits featuring clergymen, merchants and civil leaders.

In addition to portraits, he performed religious motives, both epitaphs and paintings for church altarpieces with biblical motifs. His work appears in Ølve Church in Sunnhordland (1644), at Voss Church (1642) and at Skjerstad Church in Salten (1651-1652). He completed three major epitaphs at St Mary's Church in Bergen (1643). His painting of Halsnøy Abbey on the island of Halsnøya from 1656 is regarded as the first Norwegian landscape painting.

== Personal life ==
Fiigenschoug was married to Anna Christensdatter Bloch (1620–1689), daughter of bailiff Christen Jenssøn Bloch and Berethe Andersdatter Benkestok.
