= 1650 in Denmark =

- Decades: 1630s; 1640s; 1650s; 1660s; 1670s
- See also: Other events of 1650; List of years in Denmark

Events from the year 1650 in Denmark.

== Incumbents ==
- Monarch – Frederick III
- Steward of the Realm – Corfitz Ulfeldt

== Events ==
Undated

- Fredericia is incorporated as a market town.

== Culture ==
=== Art ===
- Hans Nielsen Bang completes a pulpit for Skeby Church.
- Jørgen Ringnis completes an altarpiece for Torkilstrup Church.
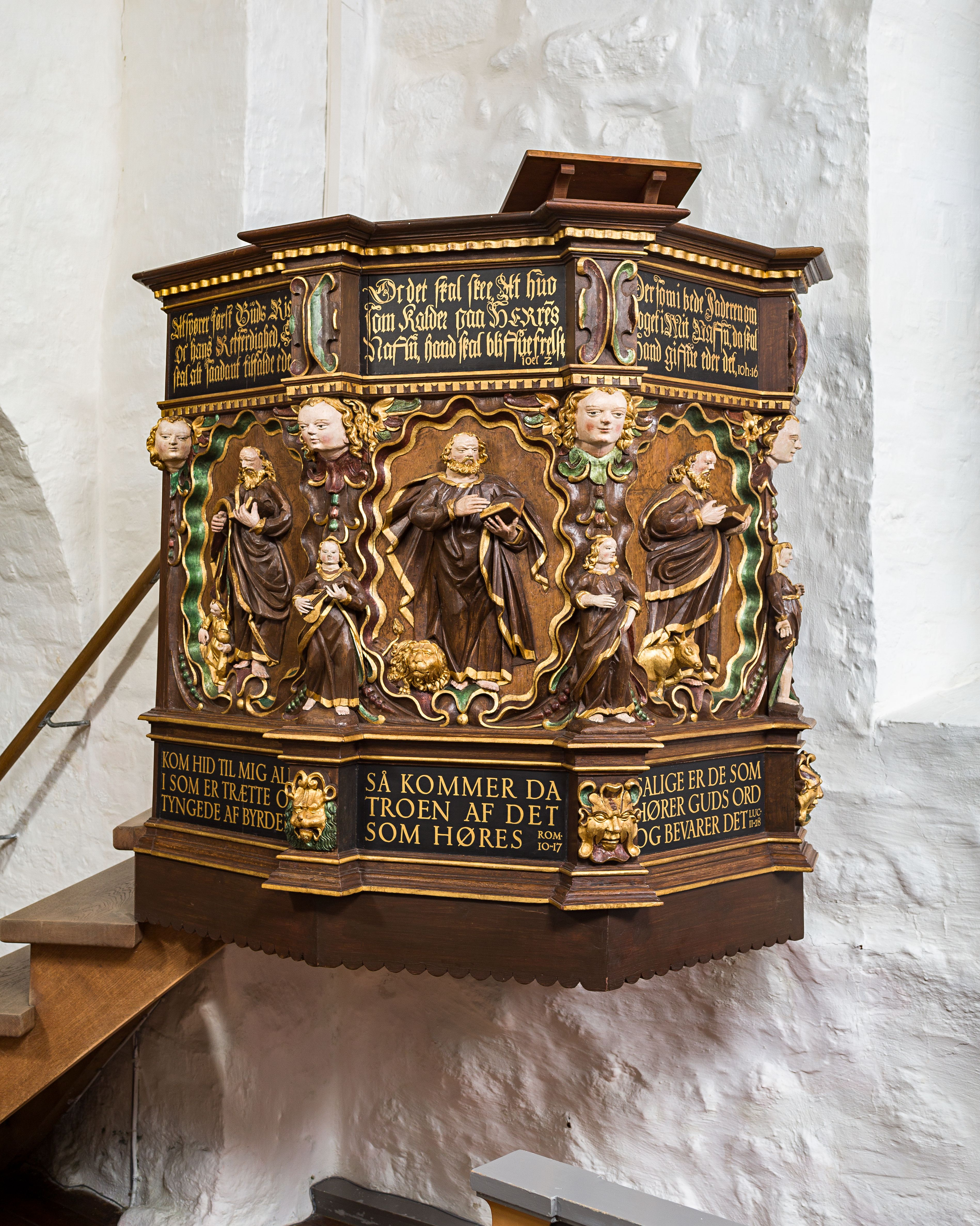
Hans Nielsen Bang's pulpit in Skeby Church.

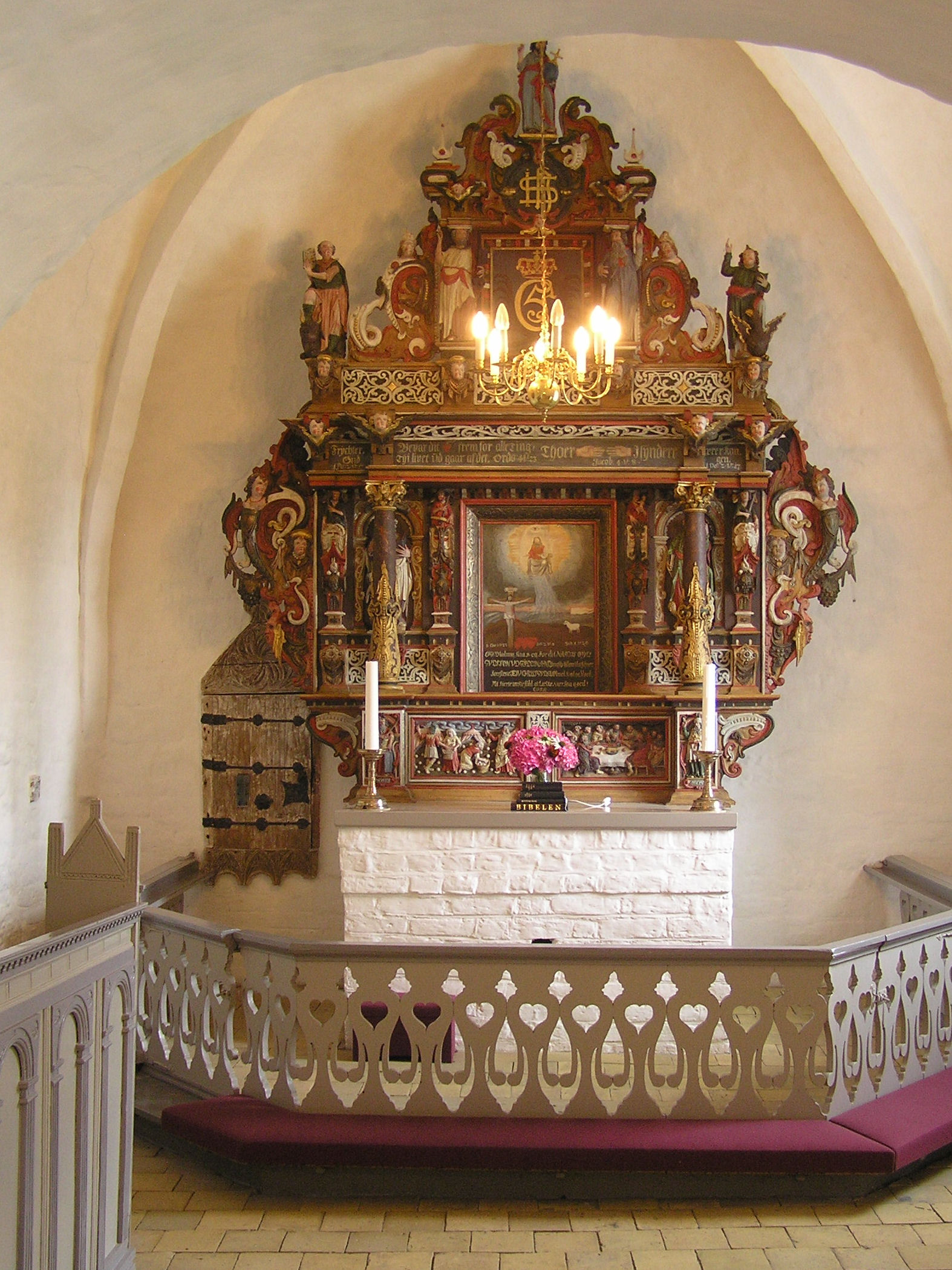
Jørgen Ringnis' altarpiece in Torkilstrup Church.

== Births ==
- June – Princess Wilhelmine Ernestine of Denmark (died 1706 in Germany)
- 24 August – Jens Rostgaard, soldier, civil servant, judge and antiquarian (died 1715)

== Deaths ==
- 22 April – Stephanius, royal historiographer and professor (born 1599)
- 7 July – Falk Lykke, nobleman (born 1583)
