= Nørre Alslev Church =

Church

Coordinates: 54°53′54″N 11°52′24″E

- Nørre Alslev Kirke
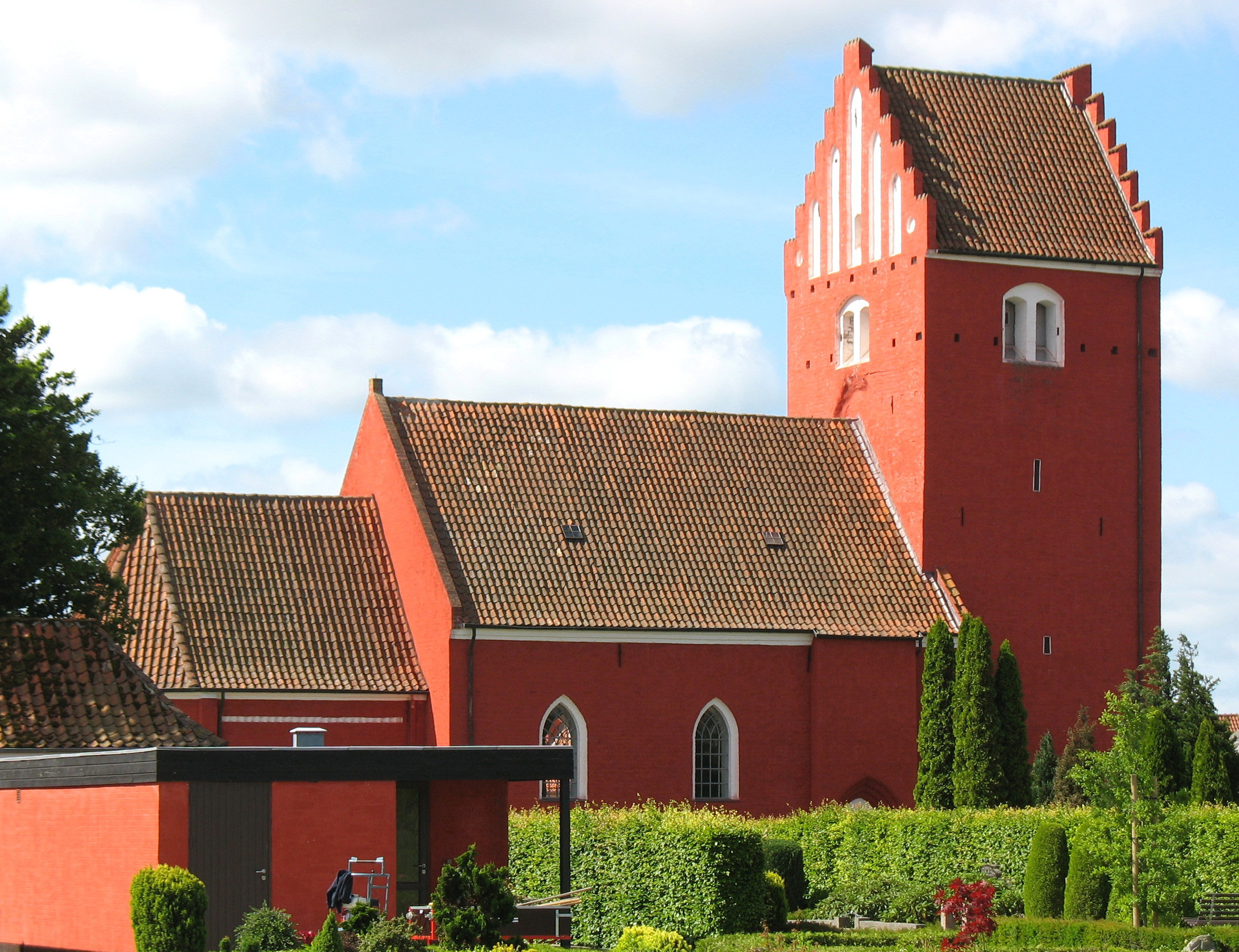
- Nørre Alslev Church
- Location: Nørre Alslev, Falster
- Country: Denmark
- Denomination: Church of Denmark

History
- Dedication: Saint Nicholas

Architecture
- Architectural type: Gothic architecture
- Completed: ca. 1308

Administration
- Diocese: Diocese of Lolland–Falster
- Deanery: Falster Provsti
- Parish: Nørre Alslev Sogn

Nørre Alslev Church (Danish: Nørre Alslev Kirke) in the small town of Nørre Alslev in the north of Danish island of Falster dates from at least 1308, a date found on its early frescos. Built in the Early Gothic style and painted pink according to local tradition, it is best known for its fresco of the death dance.

== History and architecture ==
In the Middle Ages, the church was dedicated to St Nicholas. The Early Gothic chancel and nave are built of brick on a 60 cm (24 in) high sloping foundation. The chancel, with a three-sided end, has a stepped frieze. The tower with its stepped gable and the porch are Late Gothic.

== Interior ==
The chancel has a dome-shaped vault with semicircular ribs on dwarf columns. The chancel arch is pointed while the nave has a humped vault with clover-shaped ribs and webbing. The present vault has possibly been supported by additional masonry after a fall as evidence of a higher vault has been found.

The recently restored altarpiece is the work of Jørgen Ringnis (1653). The central panel contains an alabaster relief by Henry Luckow-Nielsen (1948). The pulpit (1643) is also by Ringis.

== Frescoes ==
Nørre Alslev Church has frescos from four different periods. They have been restored on several occasions, first by Jacob Kornerup (1825–1913) who discovered them in 1895, then in 1911 by Eigil Rothe (1868–1929) and finally by Harald Borre (1891–1964) in 1941. Those in the apse date from the beginning of the 14th century, one apparently dated 1308. The Majestas Domini over the chancel arch is from c. 1350. Rothe discovered a number of frescos in the nave which were from around 1400 but they were again covered with whitewash in view of their fragile condition. Around 1500, the entire nave was decorated with frescoes by the Elmelunde Master and his workshop but many of those discovered have again been whitewashed.

The most interesting of the Elmelunde frescos is the one on the west wall depicting the death dance. While the death dance (which stems from the plague) can be seen in many church decorations across Europe, it is unusual in Denmark, the only other occurrences being in Egtved and Jungshoved. Given the limited space, the fresco in Nørre Alslev is somewhat simplified but it includes a king, a bishop, a lord and a peasant. Unlike the skeletons often represented in the death dance, the figures there are all fully clothed.

== Gallery ==
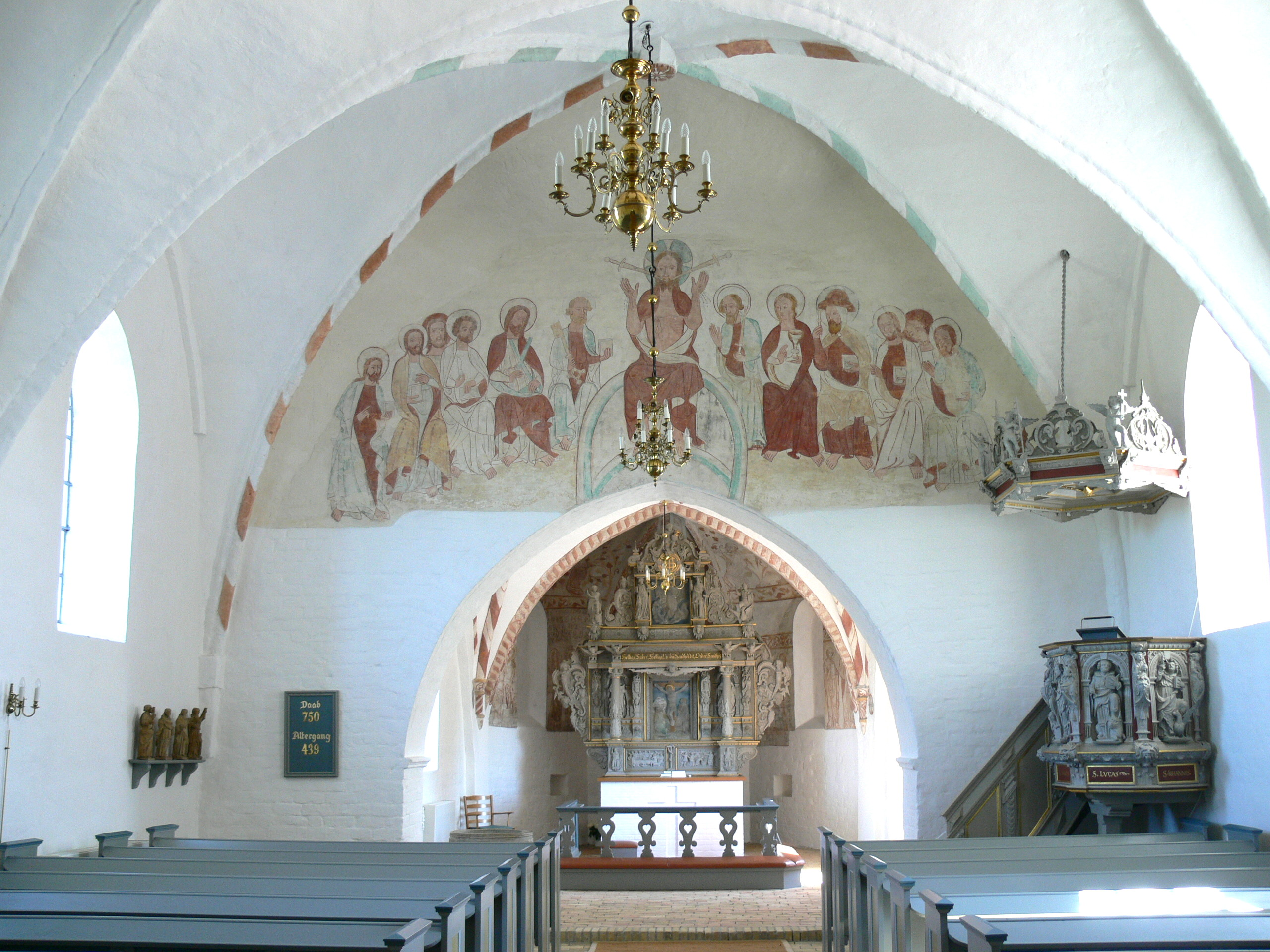
The nave and the Majestas Domini (c. 1350)

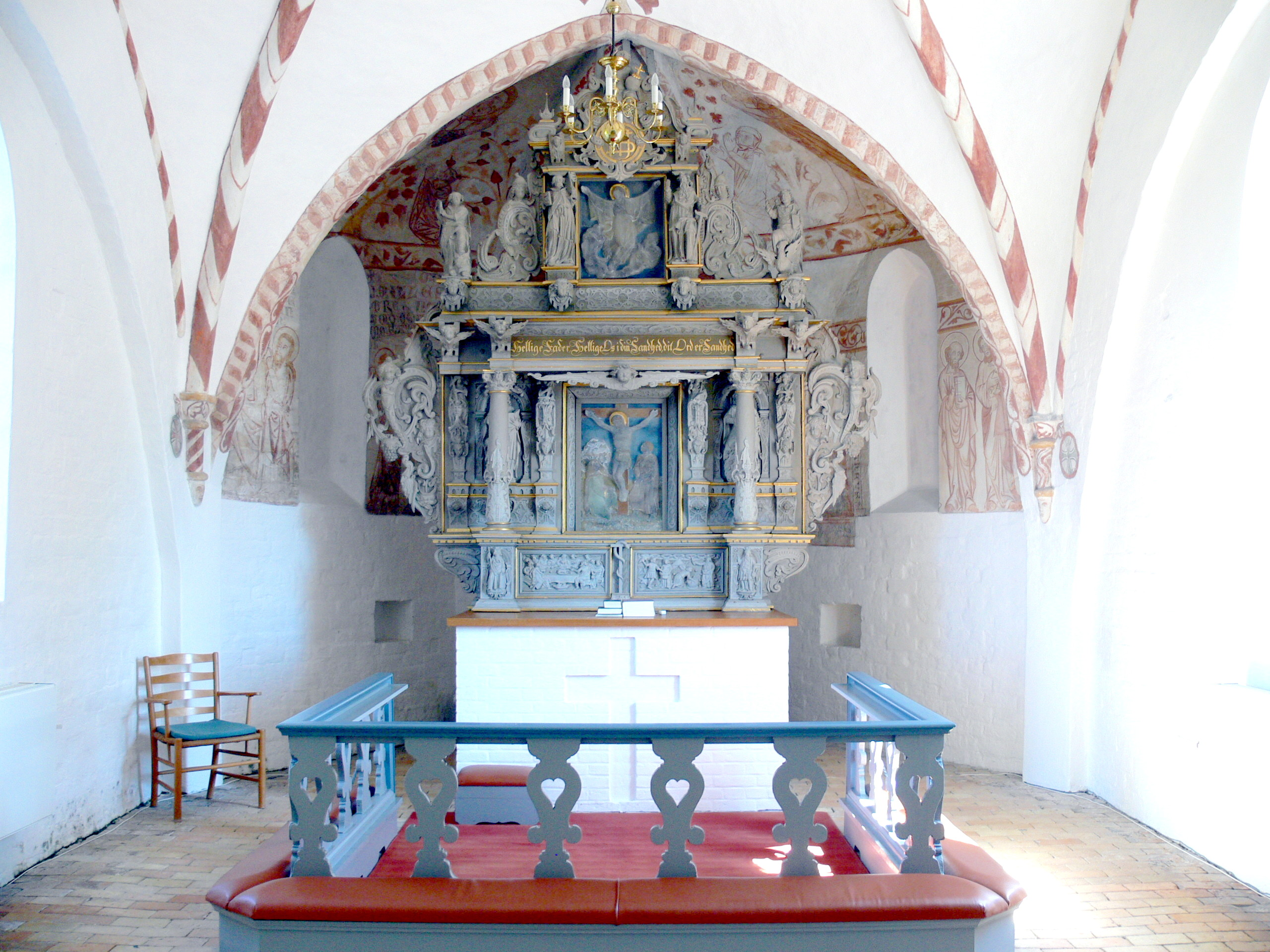
The altarpiece (1653)

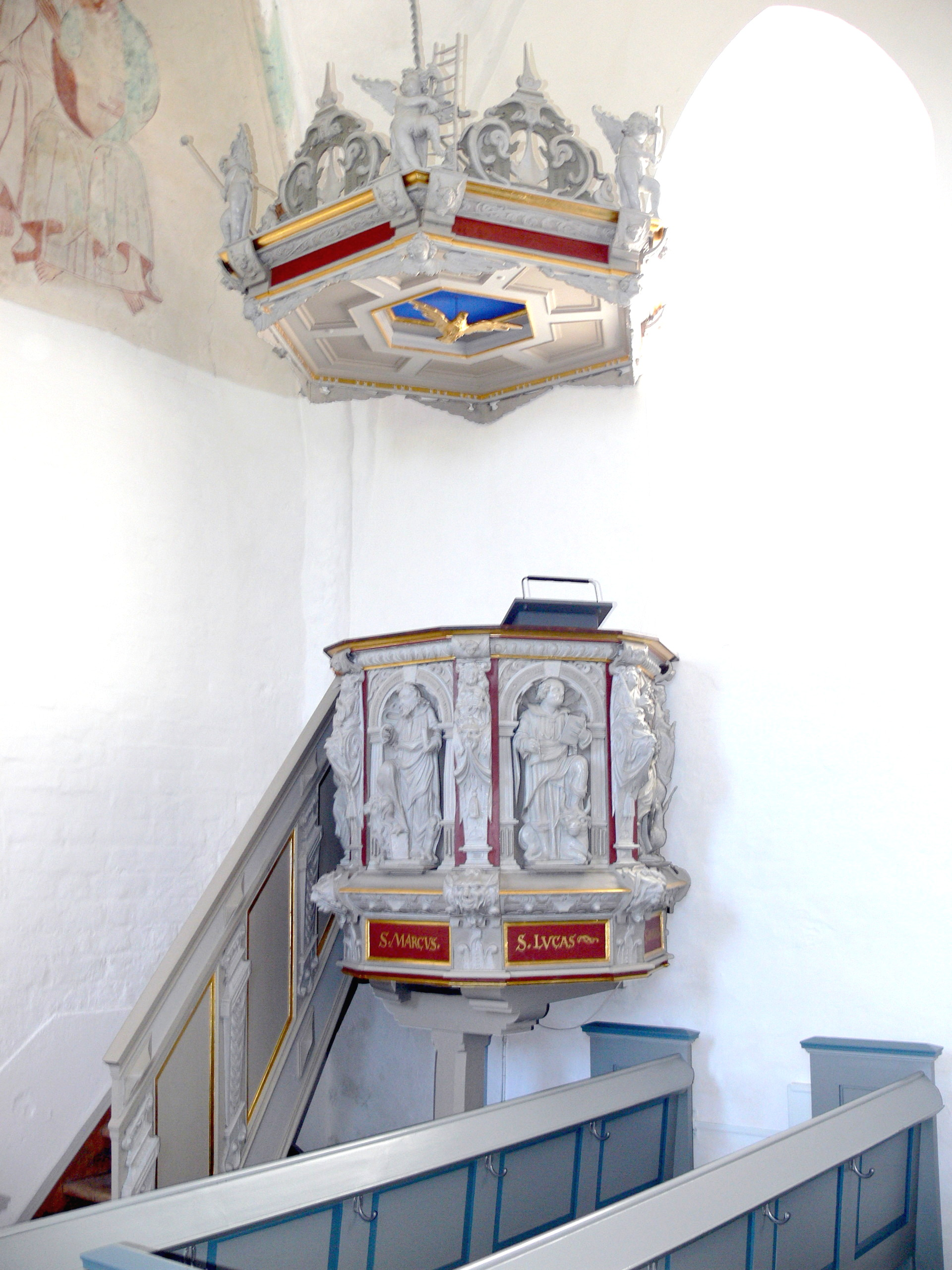
The pulpit (1643)

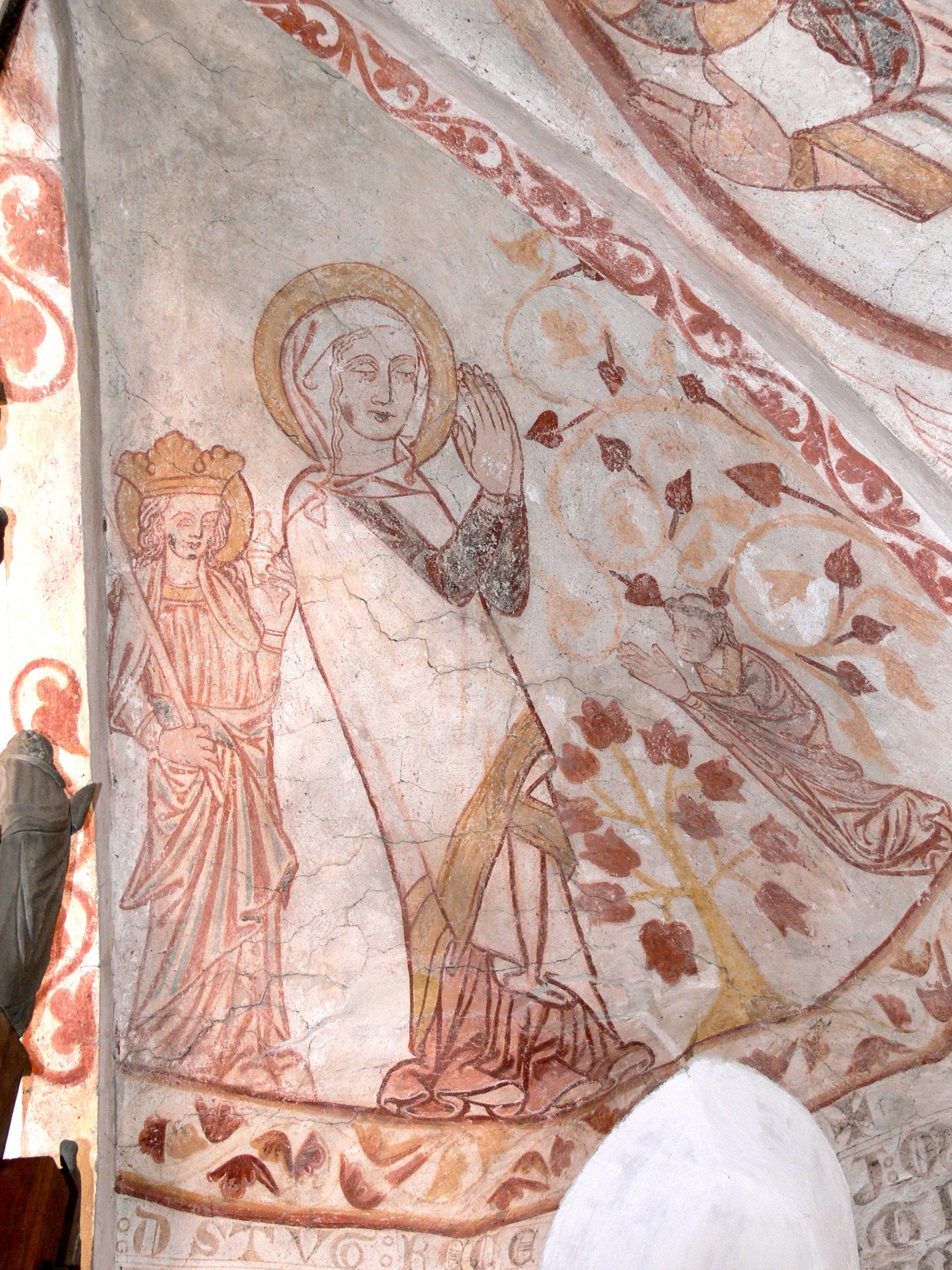
Apse fresco: the Madonna (13th century)

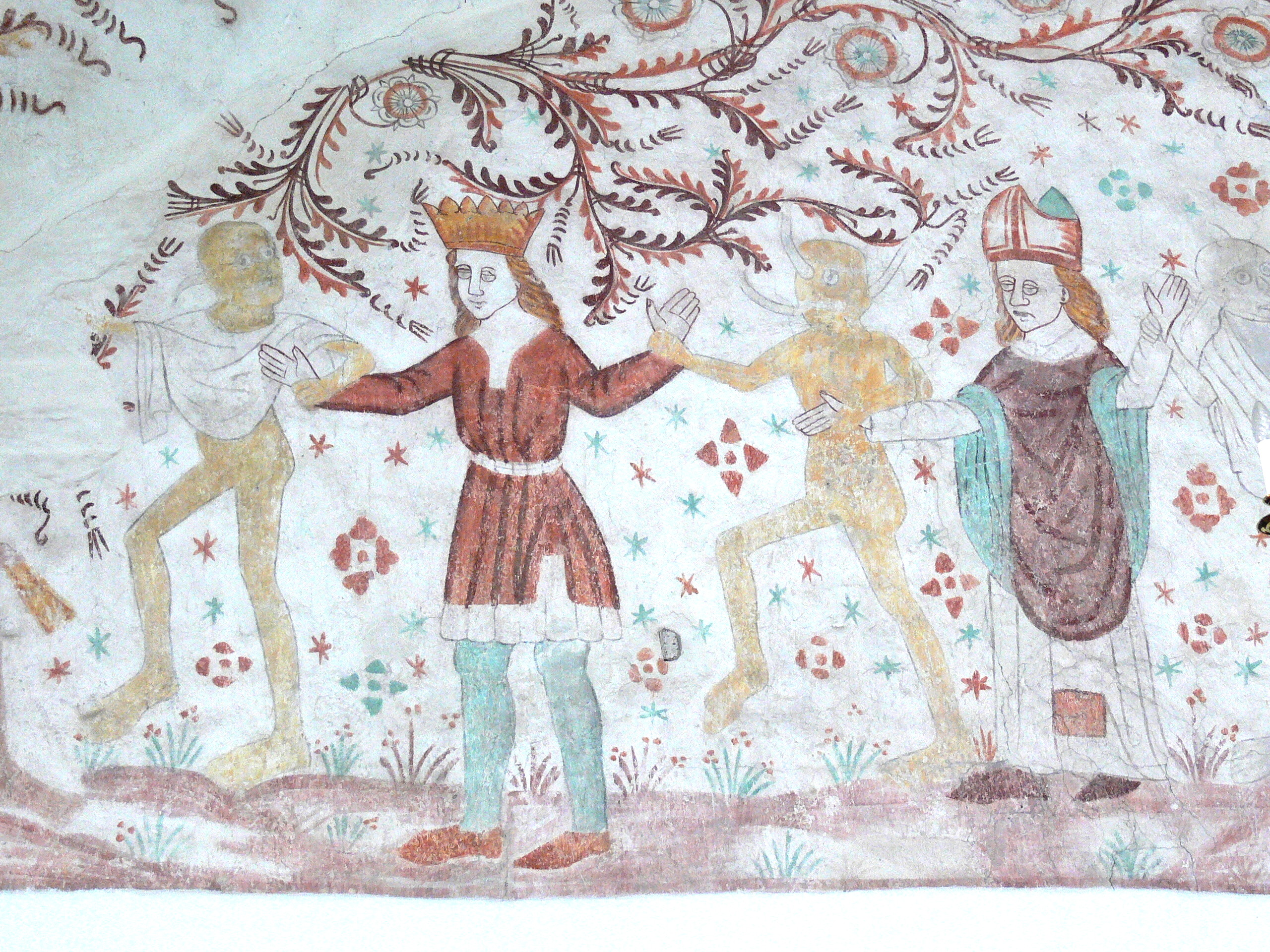
Fresco: the king and the bishop in the death dance (c. 1500)

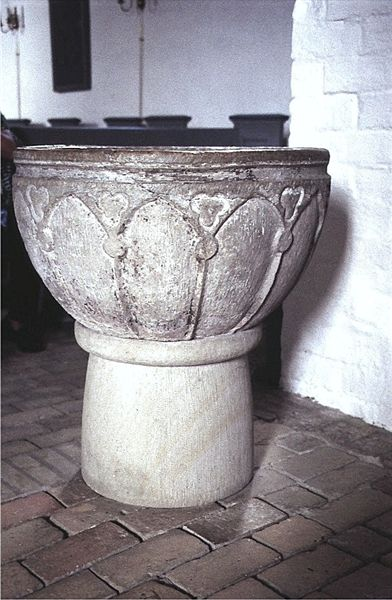
Font of Gotland limestone
