= Denmark–Portugal relations =

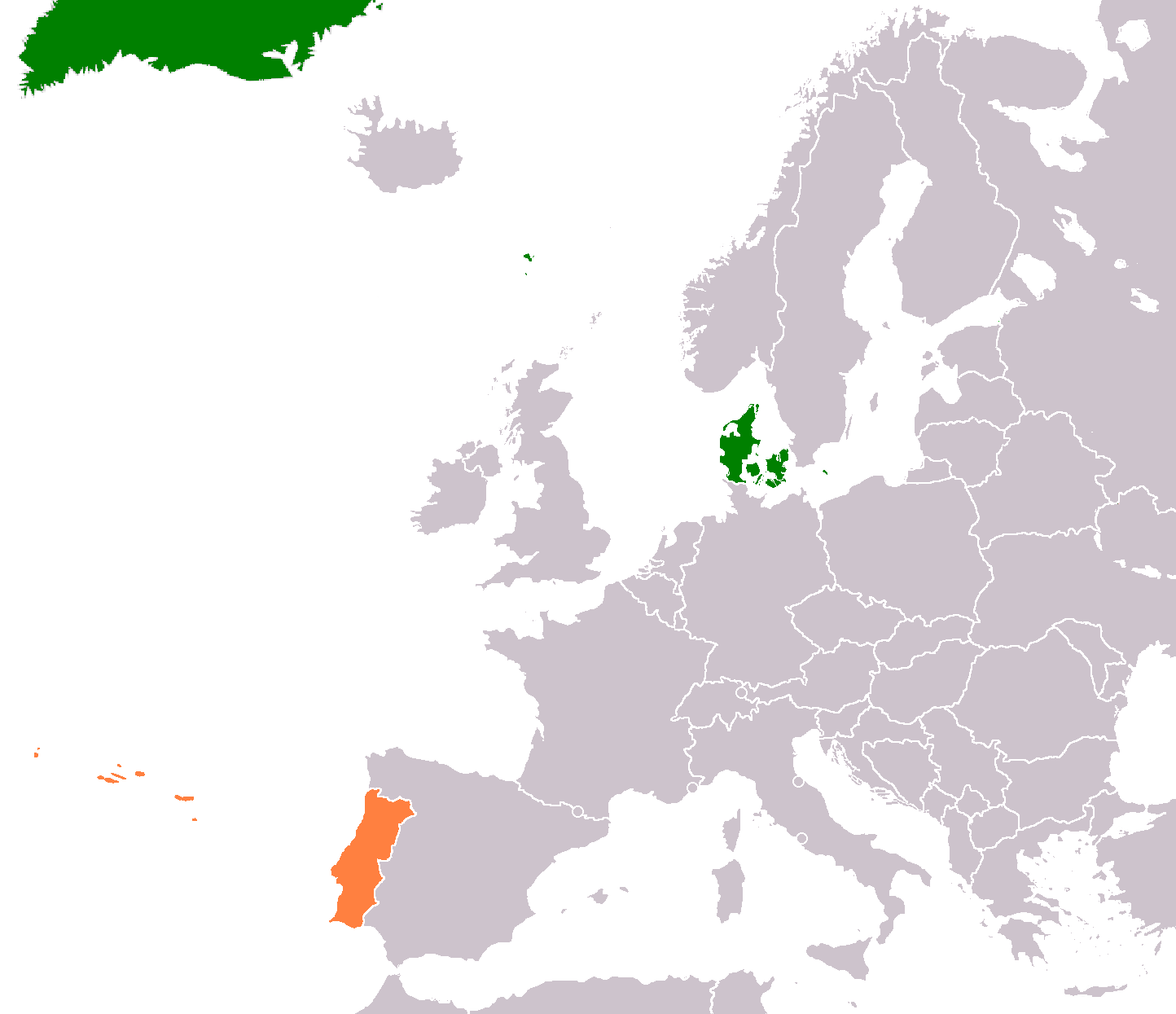
- Denmark: Portugal

Denmark–Portugal relations refers to the current and historical relations between Denmark and Portugal. Denmark has an embassy in Lisbon. Portugal has an embassy in Copenhagen. Both countries are full members of the Council of Europe, the European Union and NATO.

== History ==
Diplomatic relations between Denmark and Portugal were established on 18 March 1641 when Portuguese diplomats Francisco de Sousa Coutinho and António Moniz de Carvalho were sent to Copenhagen. The diplomatic relations were established as Portugal was at war with Spain as part of the Restoration War. King Christian IV chose not to offer the diplomats a formal audience as he did not wish to compromise the neutrality of Denmark in the conflict.

First Portuguese legation in Copenhagen opened officially in January 1769.

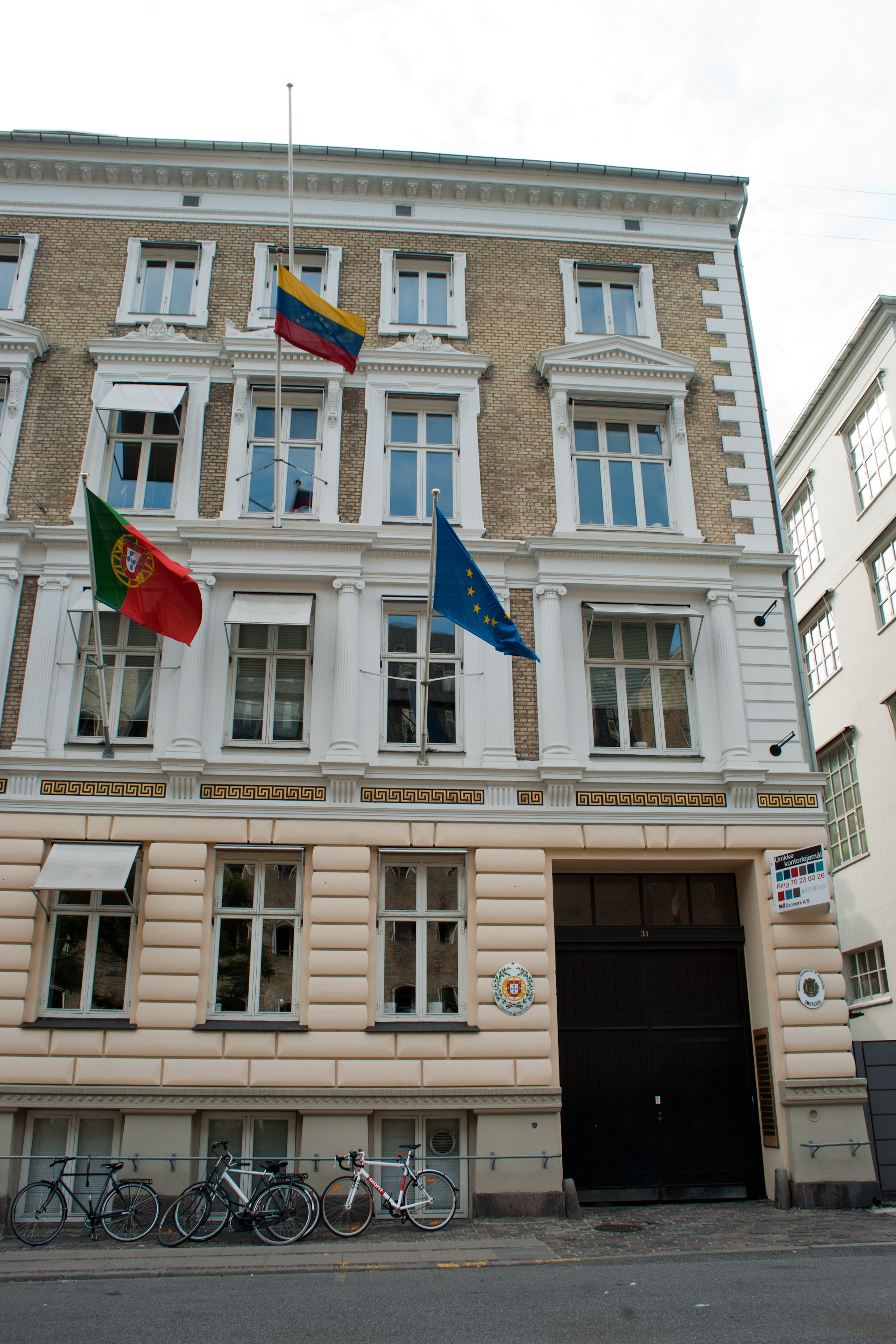
Embassy of Portugal in Copenhagen
