= 1649 in Denmark =

- Decades: 1620s; 1630s; 1640s; 1650s; 1660s
- See also: Other events of 1649; List of years in Denmark

Events from the year 1649 in Denmark.

== Incumbents ==
- Monarch – Frederick III
- Steward of the Realm – Corfitz Ulfeldt

== Births ==
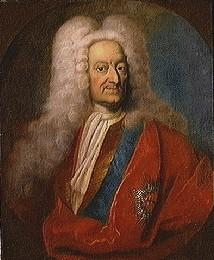
Christian von Lente.

- 29 March – Christian von Lente, statesman and diplomat (died 1725)
- 11 April – Princess Frederica Amalia of Denmark, (died 1703 in Germany)
- 4 July – Sophie Amalie Lindenov, landowner (died 1688)

== Deaths ==
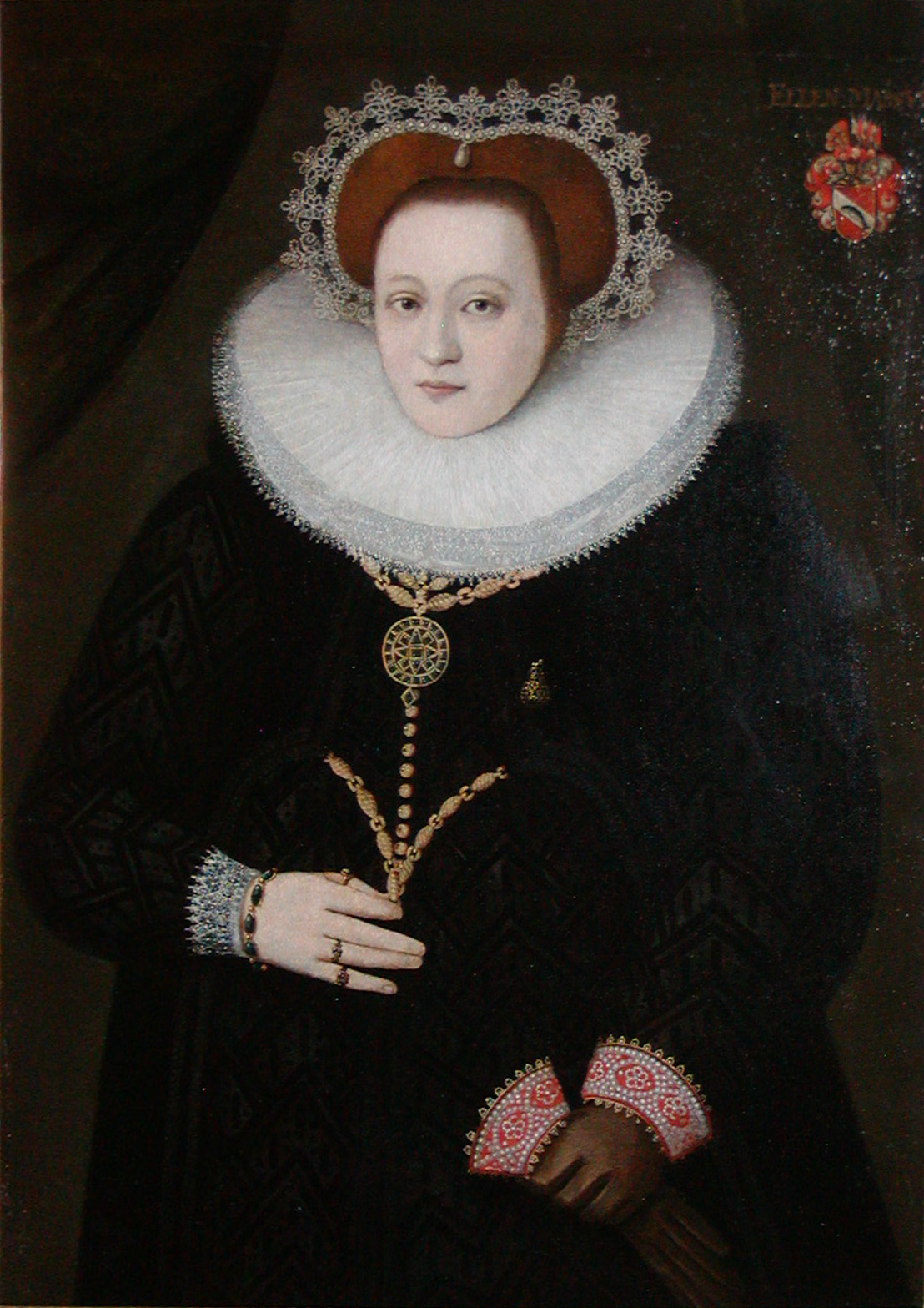
Ellen Marsvin.

- 11 February – Ellen Marsvin, noble, landowner (b. 1572)
