= 1651 in Denmark =

- Decades: 1630s; 1640s; 1650s; 1660s; 1670s
- See also: Other events of 1651; List of years in Denmark

Events from the year 1651 in Denmark.

== Incumbents ==
- Monarch – Frederick III
- Steward of the Realm – Corfitz Ulfeldt (until July), Joachim Gersdorff

== Events ==
- 11 July – The dispute between Corfitz Ulfeldt and Dina Winhofers culminates with the latter's execution. Ulfeldt and his family secretly leave Copenhagen on 4 July.

=== Undated ===
- The House of the Holy Ghost in Copenhagen is turned over to the Church of the Holy Ghost.
- Kunstkammeret ("Royal Art Cabinet") is mentioned for the first time.
- Plague rages in Denmark.

== Births ==
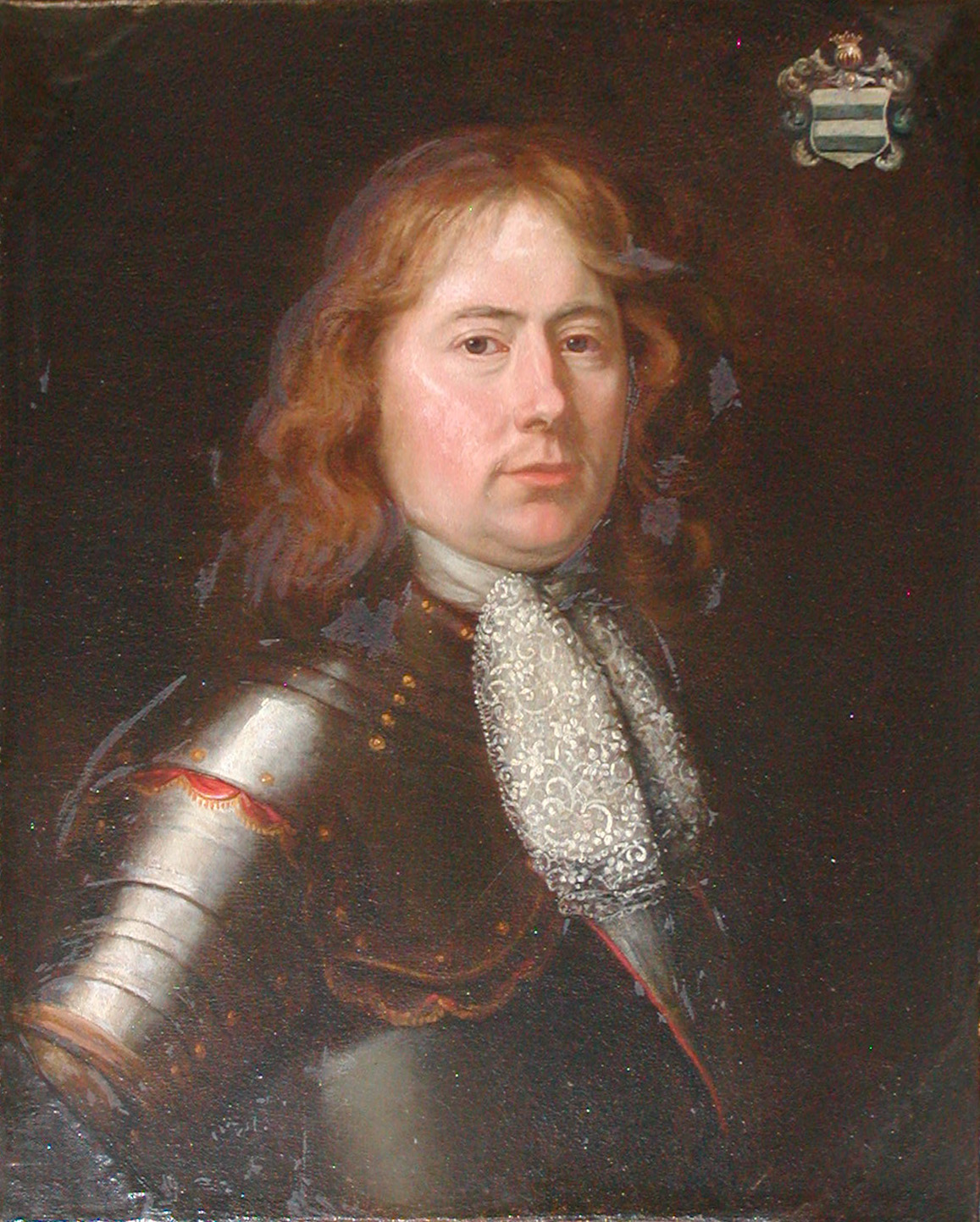
Mogens Skeel.

- 15 July – Mogens Skeel, nobleman (died 1694)
- 22 March – Leo Ulfeldt, nobleman (died 1716 in Austria)

== Deaths ==
- 7 July – Dina Vinhofvers, silk worker and accuser of Corfitz Ulfeldt (born 1620)
