= Rigborg Brockenhuus =

Danish noblewoman and lady-in-waiting

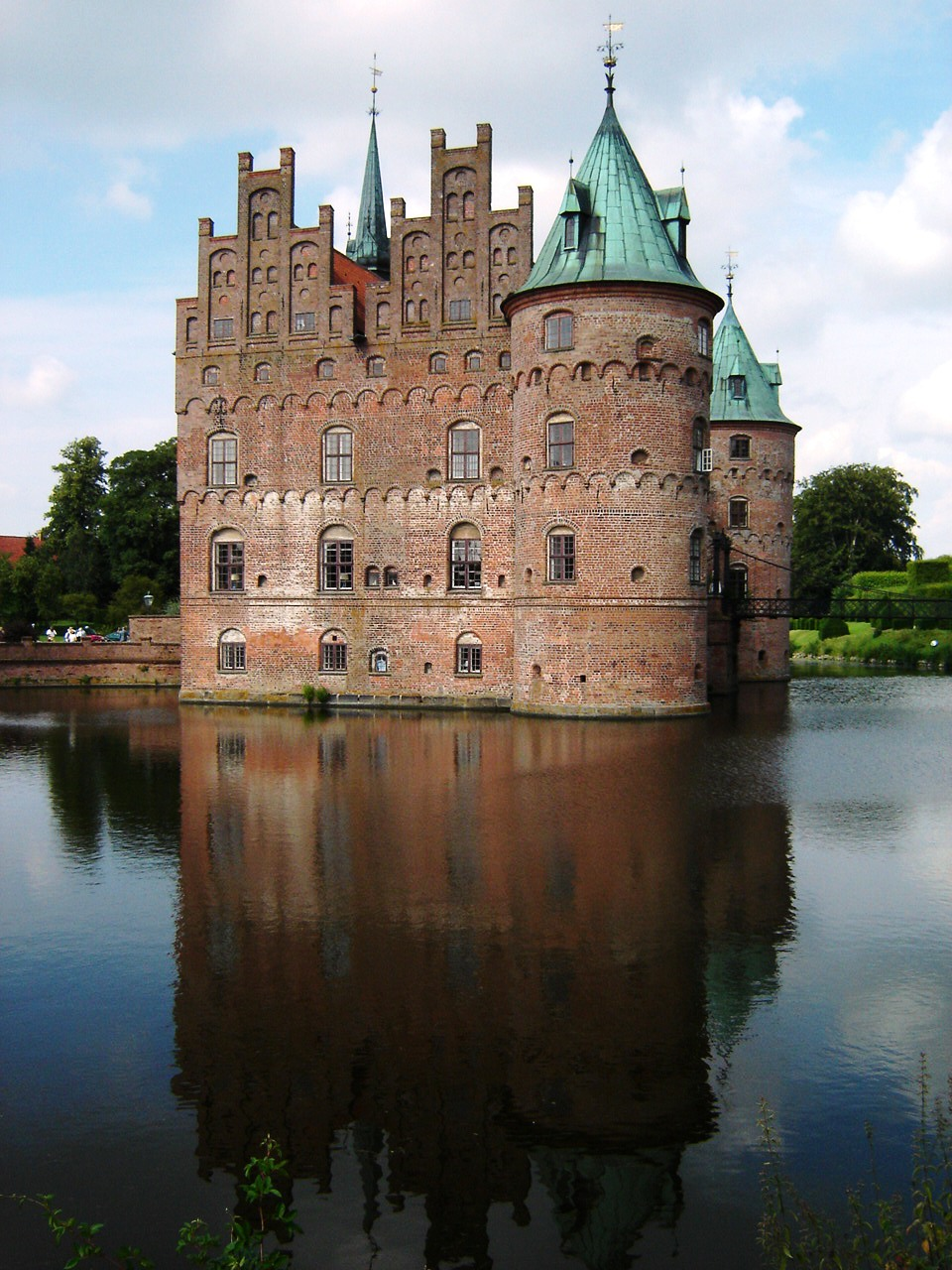
Egeskov Castle, Denmark.

Rigborg Brockenhuus (1579–1641) was a Danish noblewoman and lady-in-waiting. She was the central figure in a famous sexual offence case in 1599.

Daughter of nobles Laurids Brockenhuus and Karen Skrams, she was the sister of Jakob Brockenhuus and the maternal aunt of Corfitz Ulfeldt. She became maid of honor to the queen, Anne Catherine of Brandenburg in 1598.

In 1599, she had an illegitimate son, Holger, with the courtier Frederik Holgersen Rosenkrantz. King Christian IV charged the couple with having broken the conduct of the royal court and the presence of the monarch, as well as the common law of seduction - an exceptional judgment against two nobles. Rosenkrantz was sentenced to have two fingers amputated and to lose his nobility. The seriousness of the sentence was deemed appropriate because Rosenkrantz had been engaged to another woman, Christence Viffert. His sentence was later softened, through the intervention of astronomer Tycho Brahe, to service in the war against the Ottoman Empire, where he died in 1602.

Rigborg Brockenhuus was sentenced to life imprisonment in a room in her father's castle, Egeskov, thirty miles outside of Odense. Her son Holger was turned over to the custody of his father's family. In 1608, the queen dowager Sophie of Mecklenburg-Güstrow obtained permission for Rigborg to leave her room to attend church once a week. In 1616, Rigborg's mother secured permission for Rigborg to live on her own estates, and when her mother died in 1625, this was realized. In 1626 she was reunited with her son, Holger.

Frederik Rosenkrantz, the father of Holger, was – along with his friend Knud Gyldenstierne – the inspiration for the two treacherous characters Rosencrantz and Guildenstern in Shakespeare's Hamlet.
