= Jægerspris Castle =

Danish manor house

Coordinates: 55.8565°N 11.9742°E

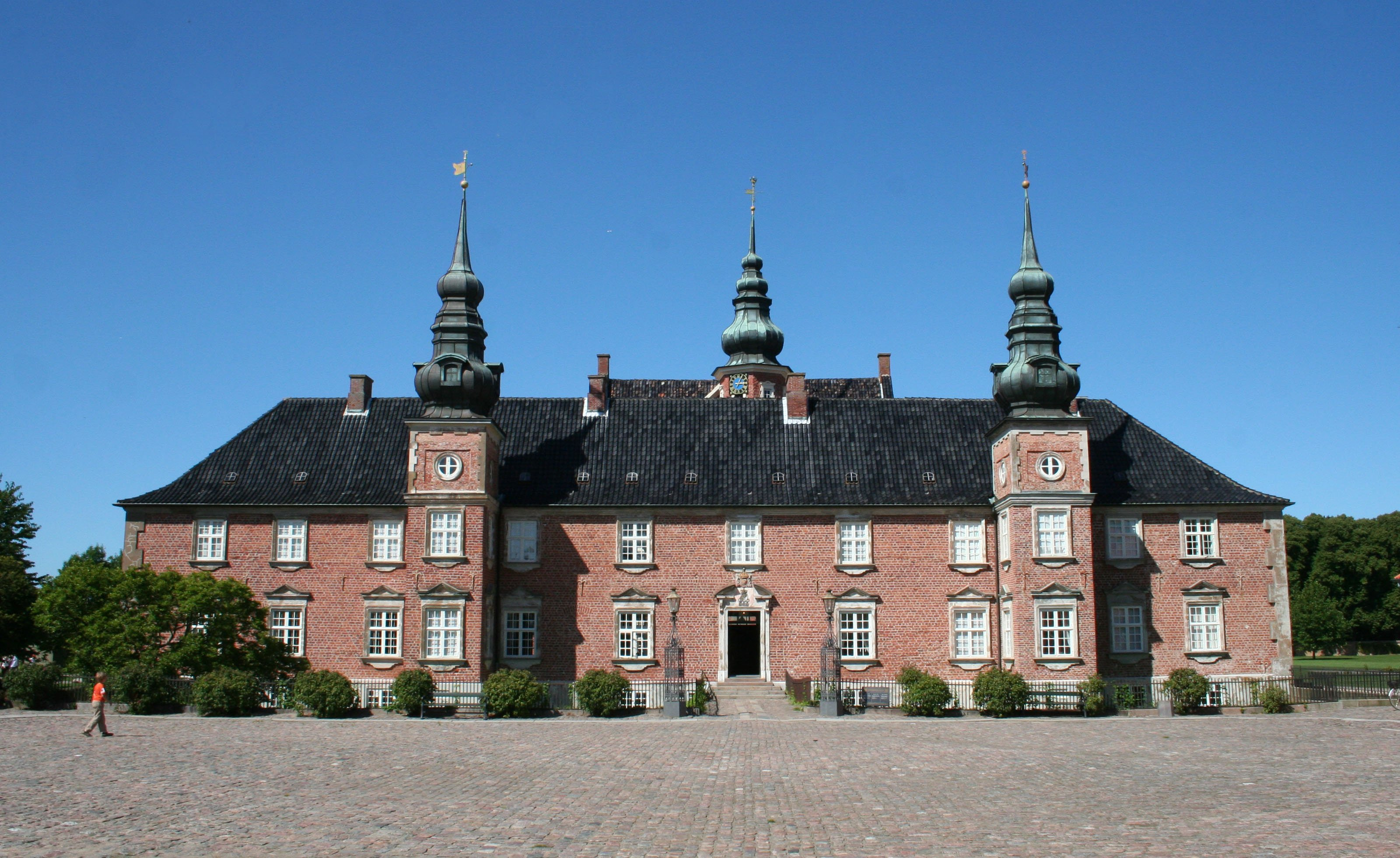
- Jægerspris Castle
- Interactive map of the Jægerspris Castle area

General information
- Architectural style: Baroque
- Location: Jægerspris, Denmark
- Construction started: 13th century
- Completed: 1722
- Client: Prince Charles of Denmark

Jægerspris Castle (Danish: Jægerspris Slot), in Jægerspris on the Hornsherred peninsula west of Copenhagen, is a Danish manor house. It has belonged to the Danish monarchs for most of its history which dates back to the 13th century. In the 1850s it became a retreat for King Frederik VII and his morganatic wife Countess Danner, who sought refuge there to escape the controversy their marriage had caused among the establishment in Copenhagen. After the king's death, Countess Danner turned it into an asylum for women.

Today the castle serves as a historic house museum. It is also noted for its park. In the years around 1770 the sculptor Johannes Wiedewelt erected a large number of monuments in the park commemorating famous Danish and Norwegian men and women. There are 54 monuments in the park and the adjacent forest, Slotshegnet. The park also contains Countess Danner's burial mound and Herman Wilhelm Bissen's bust of Frederik VII.

== History ==
=== Abrahamstrup ===
Until 1677 the estate was known as Abrahamstrup. It is not clear who Abraham was but the name is believed to be a reference to King Valdemar II's son Abel since most of Hornsherred in the 12th century was owned by the king. A source from 1318 refers to the estate as land belonging to the Crown.

In 1673 the castle passed into private ownership when it was acquired by jægermester Vincents von Hahn. In 1677 he renamed it Jægerspris, which literally translates to Hunter's Praise.

=== Prince Charles and his expansion ===
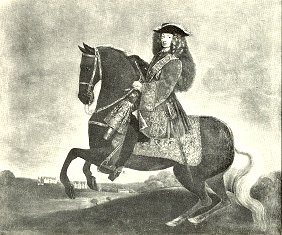
Prince Charles of Denmark mounted on one of his horses

In 1679, the castle passed back into royal ownership and shortly after Frederick IV's ascent to the throne in 1699, he used it as a summer residence for a few years but then gave it to his younger brother Prince Charles of Denmark in 1703. Prince Charles carried out a comprehensive expansion and rebuilding of the castle. The south wing was extended with an extra storey and the single, square guard tower of the southern facade of the castle was given a twin tower to the east to add symmetry to the building. Several buildings associated with the forestry and agricultural operations of the estate were also built on the grounds. They included a pheasantry and a stud farm. The adaptions of the castle were completed in 1722. In 1726, three years before Prince Charles' death, the stud farm relocated to Vemmetofte, one of his other estates.

=== Hunting palace of the Oldenburgs ===
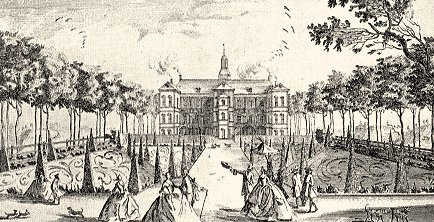
Jægerspris Castle as it appeared in 1746, contemporary tusch drawing

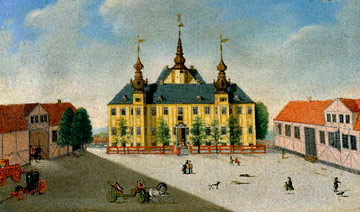
Jægerspris Castle painted by Hans Heinrich Eegberg in 1745

After Prince Charles' death in 1729, Crown Prince Christian (VI) took over the estate. Thereafter the castle continued to serve as a hunting lodge for the Danish monarchs until it was ceded to the Danish state in 1849 in connection with the adoption of the Danish Constitution.

=== Frederik VII and Countess Danner ===
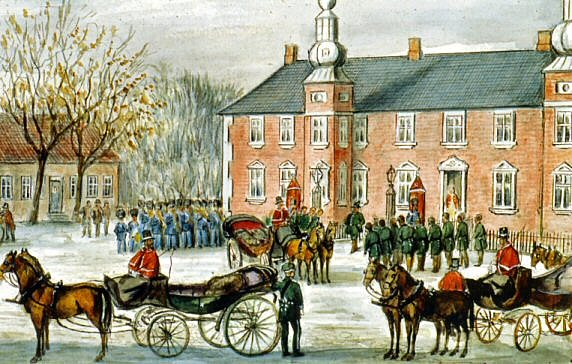
H. P. Klæstrup: Frederick VII joining a hunting party at Kægersåris Castle.

King Frederik VII acquired Jægerspris Castle on 21 April 1854, the birthday of his morganatic wife Countess Danner, as a place to spend their private life, away from the controversy their liaison had caused back in Copenhagen. They carried out a major renovation of the castle assisted by the architect Johan Henrik Nebelong.

After Frederick's death in 1863, Louise lived a discreet life there. In 1866 she opened part of the castle to the public as a historic house museum where everything was left exactly the way it was, thus commemorating the popular king and their lives together.

In 1873, she founded the Frederick VII's Foundation for Poor Women from the Working Class, and the house was called "The Danner House". On her death, she left Jægerspris Castle "to the benefit of poor and destitute servant girls".

== Park ==
In the years around 1770 the sculptor Johannes Wiedewelt erected a large number of monuments in the park commemorating famous Danish and Norwegian men and women. There are 54 monuments in the park and the adjacent forest, Slotshegnet.

The park also contains Countess Danner's burial mound and Herman Wilhelm Bissen's bust of Frederik VII.

The large oak trees in the southern section of the park were planted by Frederik V to ensure the availability of timber for naval construction. To the north there are avenues of lime trees.

=== Memorials ===
Person(s)	Image	Rendering	Event
Absalon			
Benedict			
Thomas Caspersen Bartholin and Thomas Thomasen Bartholin			
Johan Hartwig Ernst Bernstorff			
Ove Bille			
Tycho Brahe			
Peder Colbjørnsen			
Friderich Danneskiold Samsøe			
Jesper Brochmand			
Niels Ebbesen			
Hans Egede and Giertrud Rask			
Ferdinand of Braunschweig-Wolfenbüttel			
Frode Fredegod			
Johan Friis, Christian Friis til Borreby, Christian Friis til Kragerup and Niels Kaas			
Christopher Gabel			
Ove Gjedde			
Gorm the Old			
Mogens Gøye			
Peder Griffenfeld			
Ulrok Christian Gyldenløve			
Ulrich Friderich Gyldenløve			
Harald Fairhair			
Harald Wartooth			
Mogens Heinesen			
Ludvig Holberg			
Henrik Holck and Cort Adeler			
Arild Huitfeldt			
Iver Huitfeldt			
Niels Juel			
Tyge Krabbe			
Jens Lassen, Oluf van Steenwinckel, Lorentz Tuxen and Henrik Gerner			Commemorated for their attempt to win back the control of Kronborg Castle from the Swedes.
Niels Lembak			
Martin Luther			
Iver Lykke			
Hans Nansen			
Peder Palladius			
Daniel Rantzau			
Iohan Rantzow			
Peder Hansen Resen, Hans Gram, Erik Pontoppidan, Jakob Langebek and Gerhard Schøning			
Holger Rosenkrantz			
Hans Rostgaard			
Saxo Grammaticus			
Hans Schack			
Heinrich Carl von Schimmelmann			
Christen Sehstedt			
Hannibal Sehested			
Skjold			
Peder Skram			
Snorre Stvrlesen			
Hans Svane			
Hans Tausen			
Thormodus Torfæus			
Peter Tordenskjold			
Herluf Trolle and Birgitte Gøye			
Widukind			
Ole Worm			

== Legacy on film ==
The castle and its park is the main location of the Danish feature film I Tyrens tegn (1974), the second of the Zodiac-films which famously combine hardcore sex and 'folk comedy', with many familiar mainstream actors in the cast. In the film, Johan Thiersen plays the castles's lascivious owner, Count Lieberhaus, who dies and goes to hell, leaving behind a will with unusual conditions stipulating who will inherit the castle. The film concludes with the count's memory celebrated at the castle with a party including naked can-can dancers, with many of the guests ending up participating in a sex orgy in the castle park. The film was a major box office success in Danish cinemas, and decades later became a bestseller on home video.

== Transport ==
From Copenhagen there is an S-train to Frederikssund, and from there bus 316 connects to Jaegerspris with a bus stop at the castle or 230R with a bus stop close to the castle (500 meters)

== Gallery ==
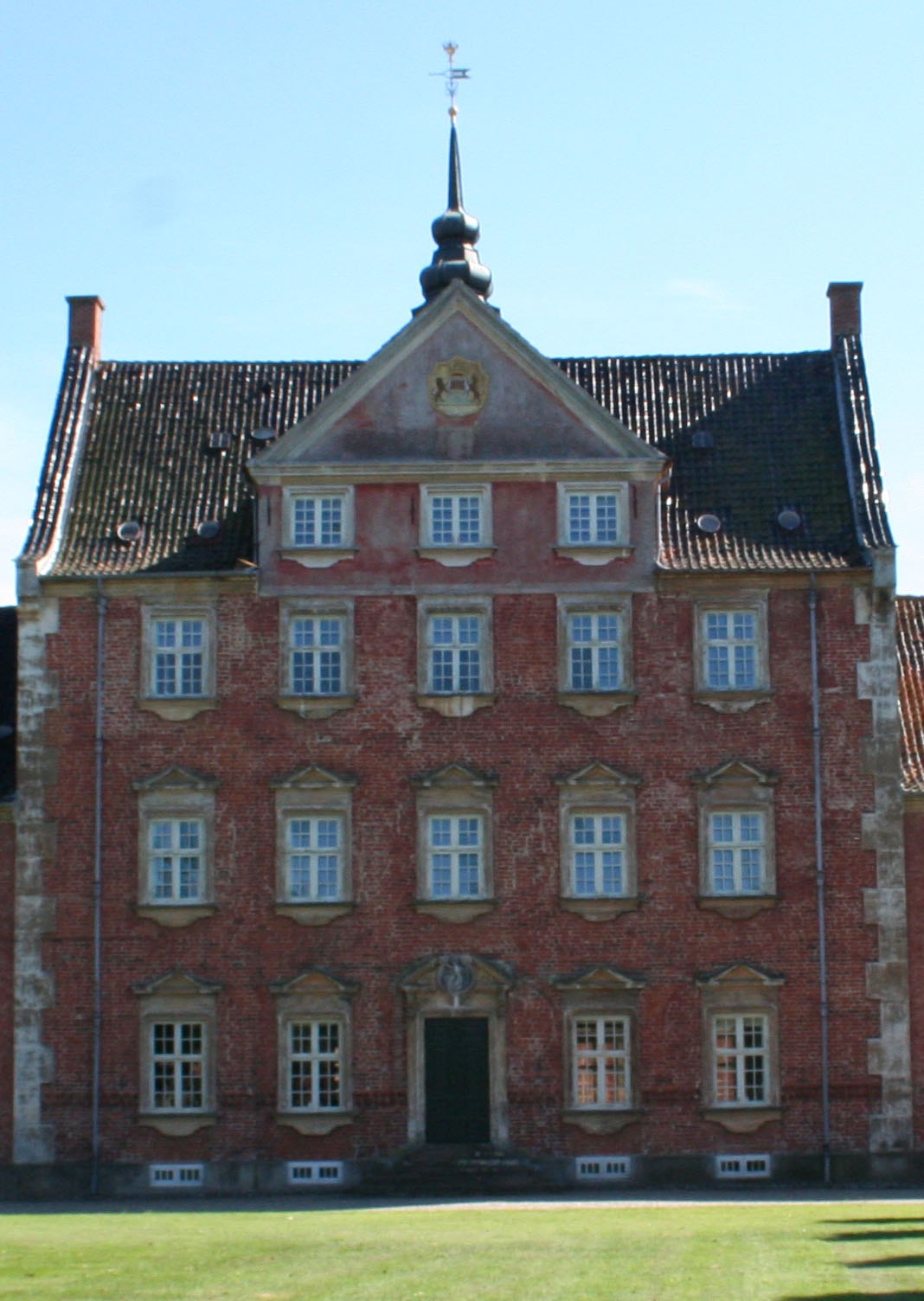
The central portion of the north wing with the oldest part of the castle

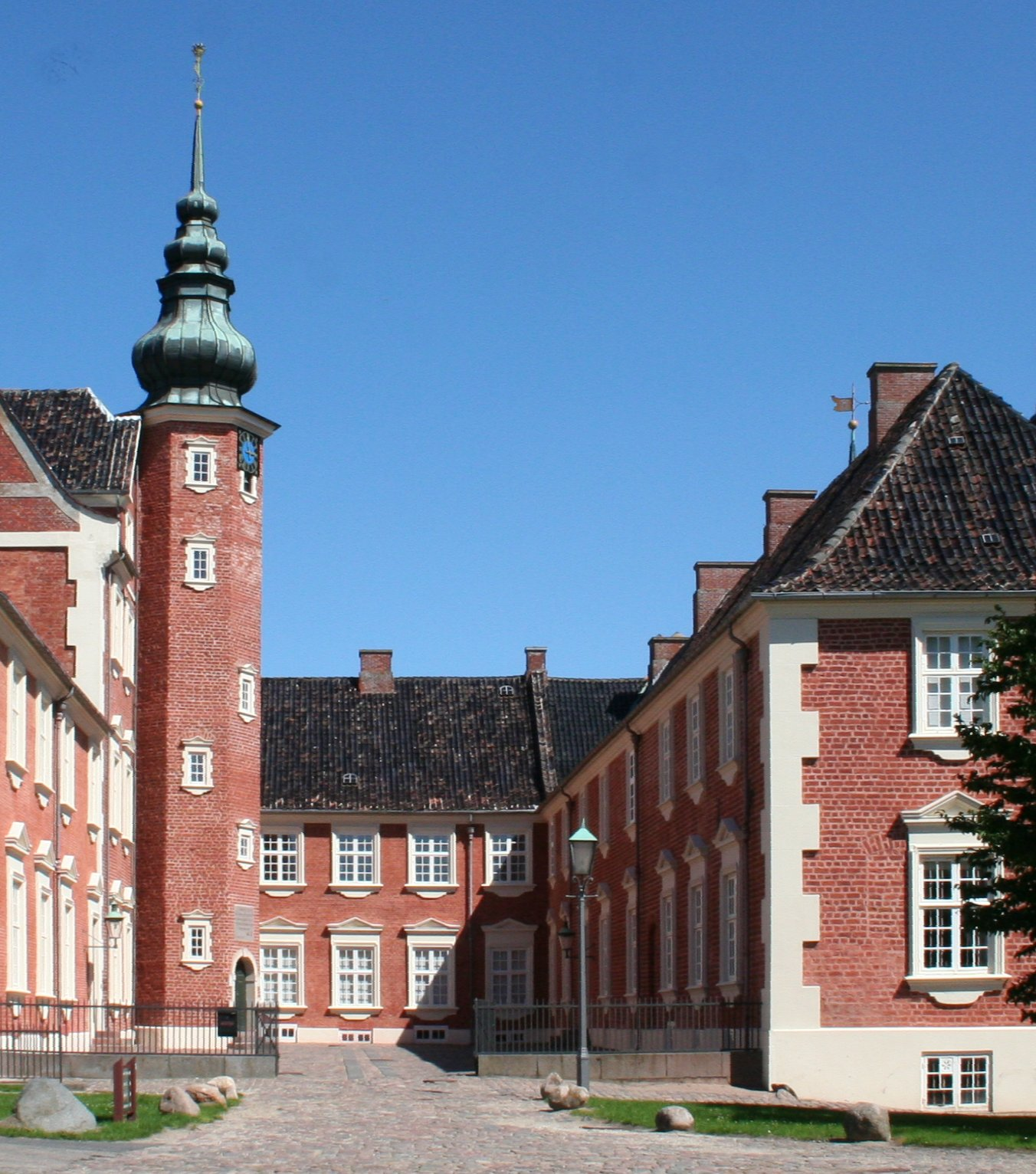
One of the towers
