= 1660 state of emergency in Denmark =

A state of emergency was declared by the King of Denmark, Frederick III in 1660. Its purpose was to put pressure on the nobility of the first estate which in Denmark at the time took the form of the Riksråd, which were reluctant to a proposal from the second (bishoprics) and third estates (burghers) to replace the elective monarchy with hereditary monarchy.

== Background ==
Prior to the state of emergency, Denmark had an elective monarchy. The king was elected upon the death of the previous king by a council of noblemen known as the Riksråd, which also functioned as a counterbalance to the king's power while they were in office.

Frederik III was elected king in 1648, following the death of his father, Christian IV of Denmark. However, the political situation surrounding his election was tense, and following a brief period of interregnum he had to offer several concessions to the riksråd in return for their vote. Part of this process was a concession fixing the number of nobles on the council to 23, when previously the number had been chosen by the king. These concessions meant that Frederik had limited use of his powers early in his reign, until the late 1650s when, using some clever political manoeuvering, the young king was able to oust two of his primary rivals from the council: Hannibal Sehested in 1651 over mismanagement of funds as the Governor-general of Norway, and Corfitz Ulfeldt in 1657 over treasonous conduct in helping Sweden during the Dano-Swedish War (1657–58). This paved the way for him to begin to solidify his power.

=== First war with Sweden ===
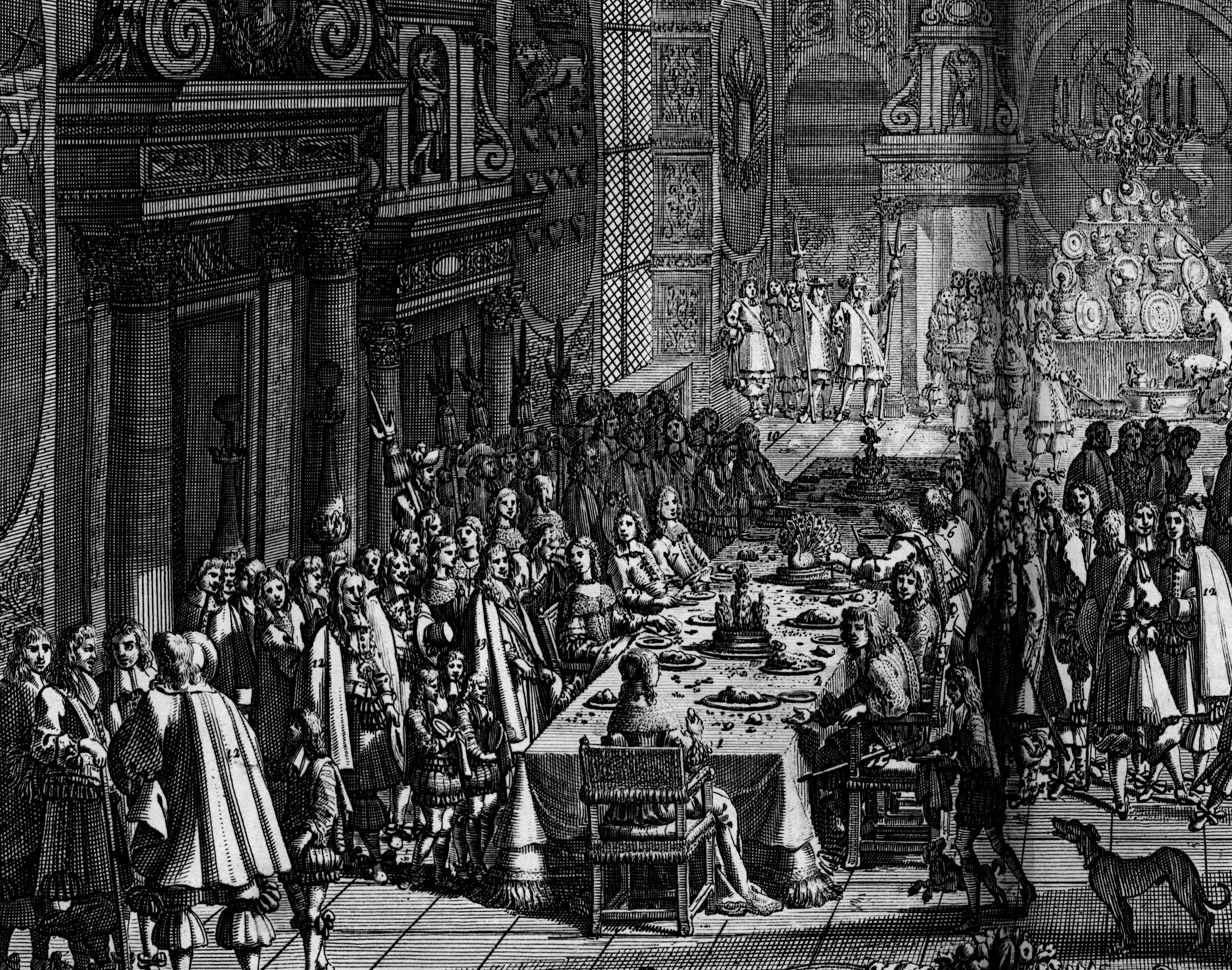
Celebration in Frederiksborg Castle to the Treaty of Roskilde. Painting (1658) by Erik Dahlbergh.

On 6 June 1654, Charles X Gustav became the king of Sweden. This was a source of concern to Frederick, who considered that the new Swedish king's temperament would lead to much aggression. An opportunity came when in July 1655, the Swedish king started a campaign against Poland, the Polish War. This was a source of relief to Frederick, who was concerned about a direct attack on Denmark. He saw this as a distinct opportunity, and with his power in the Riksråd secured, he was able to convince them on 23 February 1657 to grant significant subsidies for a mass military mobilisation for a strike on Sweden while their army was overseas in Poland. On 23 April 1657, he got permission from the council to attack Swedish holdings in Germany, and war was formally declared on 5 June 1657. However, this proved to be a mis-step for the Danish king - the Swedish army quickly abandoned their polish campaign and invaded jutland, and then marched quickly across the frozen sea to unexpectedly conquer the rest of Denmark in the March Across the Belts.

This was a crushing defeat for Frederick, who was forced to sign over almost a third of the territory he controlled in the Treaty of Roskilde. One of the provisions of the treaty was to renounce any anti-Swedish alliances, and a second condition was that Denmark-Norway must provide troops to fight in Sweden's wars, effectively making Denmark-Norway a Vassal of Sweden. Frederick, seeing the precarity of his position, resolved to make amends with his former enemy, inviting Charles X Gustav to his palace as an honoured guest, throwing banquets in his honour. The two kings were observed to speak amicably, and signs pointed towards friendship in the near future.

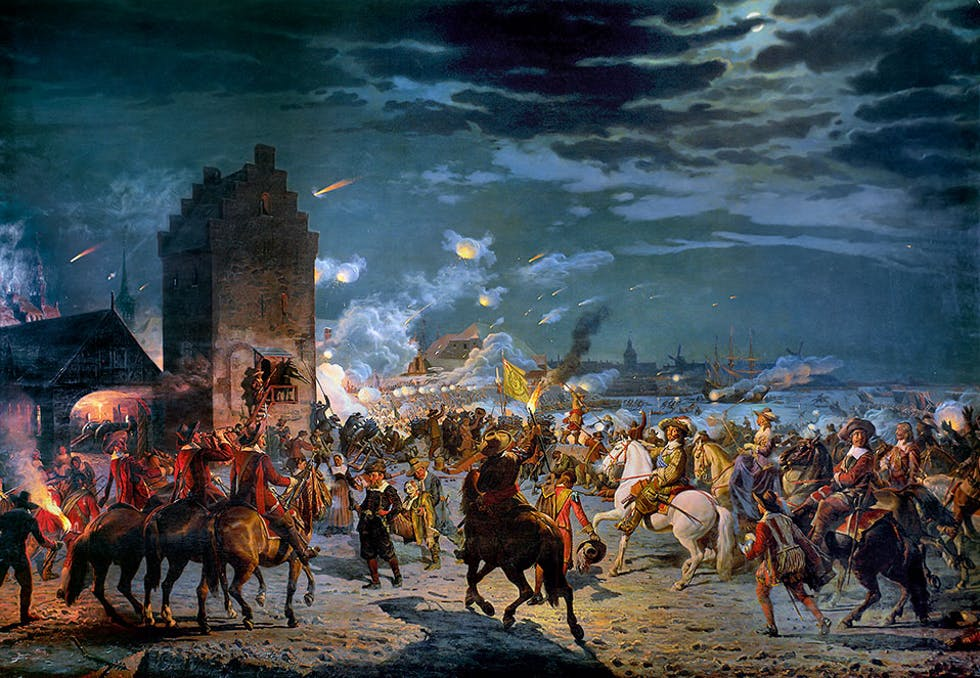
The Assault on Copenhagen in 1659 by Frederik Christian Lund, 1887, Det Nationalhistorike Museum, Frederiksborg.

=== Second war with Sweden ===
However, peace did not last long. The Swedish king was not content with his territorial gains, and made a surprise landing in Zealand on 17 July 1658. Nobody had foreseen the possibility of such a surprise attack, and the defences of the Danish capital, Copenhagen, were not well prepared or garrisoned at all. The situation seemed dire, but impressively the Danish-Norwegian king made a name for himself by dismissing advice given to him by the council to flee the city, famously insisting "Jeg vil dø i min rede", or "I will die in my nest". The king personally led the defence of the city. The Danes had only three weeks of warning of the invasion, and the unprepared and dilapidated line of defence had at first only 2,000 troops garrisoned. However, the city was led well and by September all the breaches in the wall had been repaired, cannons had been hoisted into positions around the walls, and the defending troops had swelled to over 7,000.

It was during this siege that the king worked with and struck up a personal friendship with the merchantman Hans Nansen, who also took a hand in the defence and spent much of his own money to assist in the equipping of the garrison, making him also popular. with the citizens. This friendship proved invaluable to the king later on at the meeting of the estates.

The Swedish king had originally planned to directly assault the capital, but upon seeing the improved defences, began a protracted siege. The siege was broken just over a year after it had begun when the Dutch fleet came to copenhagen's aid, defeating the Swedish naval fleet at the Battle of the Sound and cutting off the besieging Swedish army from supply. The Dutch then assisted in liberating the rest of the Danish isles, and shortly afterwards the Treaty of Copenhagen (1660) was signed on 27 May 1660.

The king's well known and valiant defence as well as refusing to abandon his people caused him to become immensely popular with the people, setting the stage for his consolidation of power.

== Declaration of Emergency ==
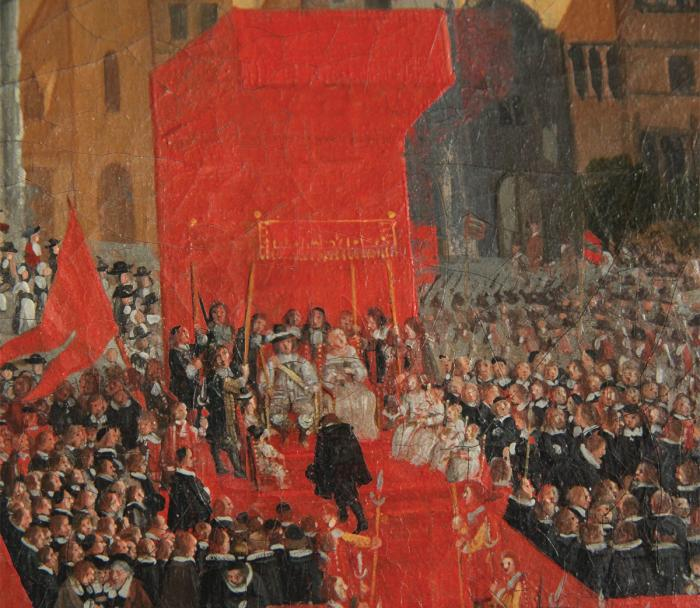
Paying homage to the hereditary king in front of the Castle of Copenhagen. Painted by Wolfgang Heimbach, 1666

Following the second war in under 3 years, Denmark-Norway was on the verge of bankruptcy. Frederick's debts had reached over 5 million rigsdalers, which posed a significant problem.

In September 1660, a Declaration of Emergency was proclaimed. This called the estates together to meet to discuss problems in the realm. At the meeting the estates were to discuss the financial problems caused by the wars, and significant negotiations were made over the issue of tax. The three estates were represented as follows:

- The nobles, represented by the Riksråd.
- The clergy, represented by Hans Svane
- The burghers, represented by Hans Nansen

The nobility were attempting to defend their traditional tax exemptions but were surprised by the fierce opposition from the clergy and the burghers. The nobles dug their feet in and refused to concede any ground, which irritated the leaders of the other two factions to the extent that at a hint from the king Hans Nansen, senior burgomaster of Copenhagen, made an impassioned speech to the other burgesses about a revolutionary proposal for a fundamental restructuring of the Danish state, calling for the abolition of Frederick's election charter, the Haandfæstning, as well as introducing a permanent hereditary monarchy (as Norway had been since 1537) and the abolition of all noble privileges in the form of tax exemptions and land grants. The nobles protested strongly, but the king backed the two non-nobility estates, forming a body that he called the "Conjoined Estates", and appointed the bishop Hans Svane as their chairman. On 8 October 1660 they then met at the bishop's palace. It was here that the bishop made his own motion, stating, "Equal rights for all and a free hand for the king." A document was then made laying out these demands, and was taken to the nobles, who rejected the radical proposal. On the evening of 20 October Frederick made it publicly known that he intended to accept the offer without the position of the council, and placed Copenhagen under martial law, as well as tightened military control across the country. The Riksråd council was unpopular, and with the military acting on the side of the king they were completely outmanoeuvered and decided to yield under this extreme pressure. Three days later, Conjoined Estate representatives and delegates from the Riksråd officially offered the hereditary throne to Frederik and his successors. A Commission was established, in which nobles were heavily outnumbered, to consider the constitutional implications, and on 27 October, Frederik's coronation charter ( Haandfæstning ) was ceremoniously returned to him.

For their parts in this process the King thanked Hans Svane by raising him to the rank of Archbishop, who was the only Danish archbishop to have ever existed. Hans Nansen mostly retired from politics and returned to his merchant work, but in high regard.

== Kongeloven ==
The King's Law (Danish: Kongeloven) was the first assertion of Divine right of kings in Europe in a written constitution, stating that the king "skal være hereffter og aff alle undersaatterne holdes og agtes for det ypperste og høyeste hoffved her paa Jorden offver alle Menniskelige Lowe, og der ingen anden hoffved og dommere kiender offver sig enten i Geistlige eller Verdslige Sager uden Gud alleene." - the king "shall from this day forth be revered and considered the most perfect and supreme person on the Earth by all his subjects, standing above all human laws and having no judge above his person, neither in spiritual nor temporal matters, except God alone." This in effect gave the king the right to overrule and abolish any other position of power unilaterally, which he then used to abolish the Riksråd council, leaving the king without any limitations to his power.

== See also ==
- Aristocracy of officials
- An Account of Denmark, as it was in the Year 1692
