= Christoffer Gabel =

Danish statesman

Christoffer von Gabel
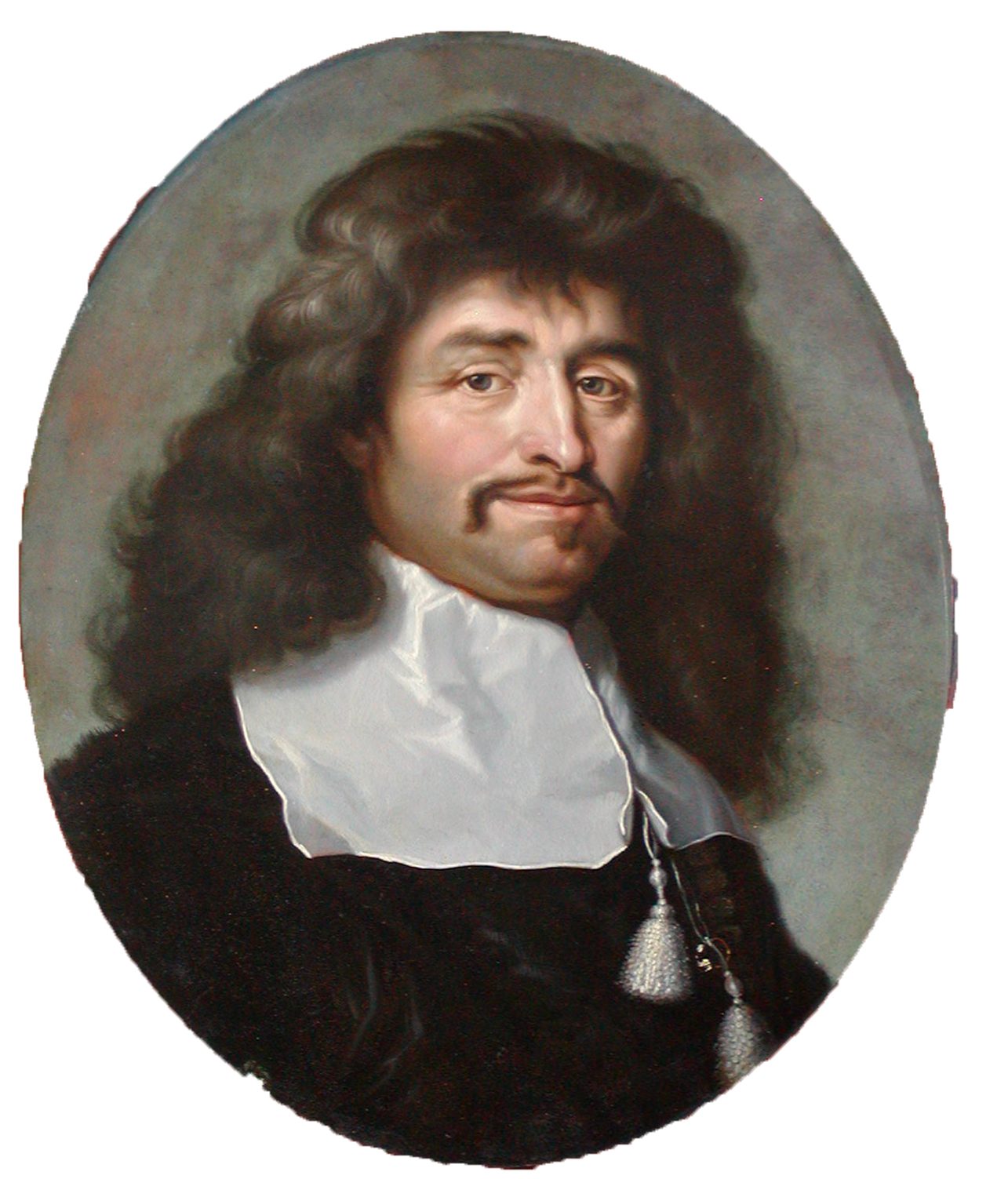
- Portrait of Gabel by Karel van Mander III
- Born: 6 January 1617; Glückstadt, Duchy of Holstein (now Germany)
- Died: 13 October 1673 (aged 56); Copenhagen, Denmark

Christoffer Gabel (6 January 1617 – 13 October 1673) was a Danish statesman. He was the father of Vice Governor-general of Norway, Frederik Gabel.

== Biography ==
He was born on 6 January 1617 at Glückstadt. His father, Wulbern or Waldemar Gabel, originally a cartographer and subsequently recorder of Glückstadt, was killed at the siege of the fortress there, by the German Imperial Army, in 1628. Nothing is known of Christoffer's youth, but it is certain he received a university education. Christoffer's name is first recorded in 1639, as overseer and accountant at the court of the Archbishop of Bremen, Duke Frederick. When the duke ascended the Danish throne as King Frederick III, Gabel followed him to Copenhagen as his private secretary and man of business, holding great influence over the irresolute king.

During the brief interval of peace between King Charles X's first and second attack upon Denmark, Gabel was employed in several secret missions to Sweden; and he took part in the conspiracies that resulted in the autocratic revolution of 1660. While not the originator of the revolution, he was certainly the chief intermediary between Frederick III and the Conjoined Estates in the mysterious conspiracy which established absolutism in Denmark-Norway. His activities won the king's lifelong gratitude. He was enriched, ennobled, and in 1664 made governor of Copenhagen. From 1660 to 1670 he was regarded as the most influential figure at court, and very largely employed in financial and diplomatic affairs. During the early and mid 1660s there was an influential circle around Hannibal Sehested, Frederik Ahlefeldt, Peter Bülche, Hans Svane, Jacob Petersen and Theodor Lente, who became increasingly opposed to Gabel. During this period he carried out a pro-French foreign policy, while his domestic policy was affected by laziness and corruption.

When Frederick III died, in February 1670, Gabel's power was at an end. The new ruler, Christian V did not favour him, and accusations against Gabel poured in from every quarter. When, on 18 April 1670, he was dismissed, there was no public sympathy for a man who had grown wealthy in a time of widespread poverty. He was stripped of all titles and privileges, except the financial control of the Faroe Islands. He spent his remaining time in Copenhagen, and died on 13 October 1673 and was buried in St. Peter's Church.

== Sources ==
- Christian Bruun, "Gunde Rosenkrantz: Et Bidrag Til Danmarks Historie Under Frederik Den Tredie", 2008, ISBN 0-559-24640-4 Google Books edition
- Carl Frederik Bricka, "Dansk biografisk Lexikon : Volume V : Faaborg - Gersdorff", Copenhagen, 1891 Online edition
- Anders Thiset, "Danmarks Adels Aarbog : Volume X, Dansk Adelsforening, 1893
- Dansk Biografisk Leksikon Online Edition
