= Riberhus =

Former royal castle in Ribe, Denmark

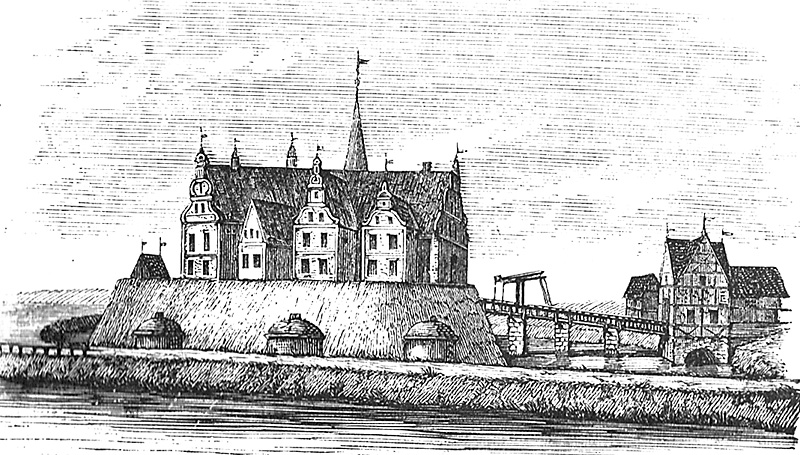
- Riberhus viewed from the north.

General information
- Location: Ribe, Denmark
- Coordinates: 55°19′50″N 8°45′25″E
- Completed: 1260s
- Demolished: 17th century
- Client: Eric V of Denmark

Riberhus was a royal castle situated on the western outskirts of Ribe, Esbjerg Municipality, Denmark. Throughout the Middle Ages, it was one of the more important royal castles in Denmark. In 1537–1543, Christian III undertook a renovation of the building. After the Swedish wars in the 17th century, the castle lost its military importance and fell into disrepair.

The site is now referred to either as Riberhus Slotsbanke or Toberhus Voldsted. It consists of an approximately 8-metre-tall (26 ft), almost quadratic embankment surrounded by moats. On the southern corner of the castle bank stands a bronze statue of Queen Dagmar by Anne Marie Carl-Nielsen.

== History ==
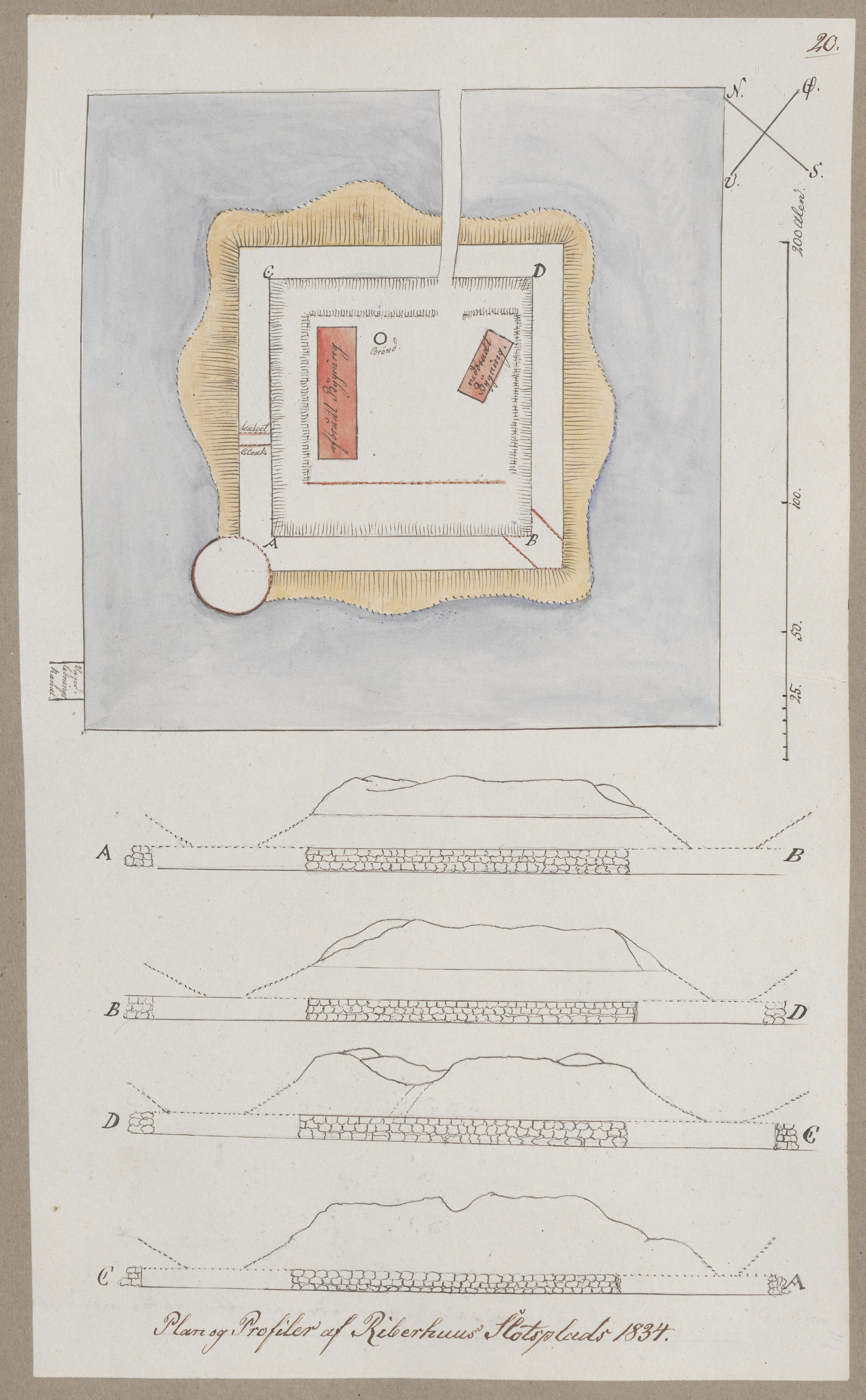
Johann Gottfried Burman Becker: Plan from 1884.

The castle is believed to have been built by King Eric V of Denmark in the 1260s. The name Riberhus is first recorded in 1320 in connection with the håndfæstning Christopher III had to sign in order to become the country's king. The document obliged the king to demolish all his castles in Jutland apart from Skanderborg Castle, Koldinghus and Riberhus.

The castle was initially the seat of the king's vassal of Southwestern Jutland, and thus the centre of local government. During this period, a number of royal castles were built across the country to strengthen the king's power in the regions and guard against attack. They included Koldinghus, Riberhus, Copenhagen Castle, Næsbyhoved Castle near Odense, Sønderborg Castle and Nordborg on the island of Als, Tårnborg near Korsør, Nyborg, Gurre Castle and Søborg in the north of Zealand, Aalholm and Ravnsborg on Lolland and many more.

In 1330, Christoffer II pawned Riberhus to Gerhard III, Count of Holstein. In 1383, it was finally reacquired by Valdemar Atterdag.

The castle was one of the crown's most important castles. Throughout the Middle Ages, it was frequently frequented by the Danish kings. In the beginning of the 16th century, Riberhus had fallen into neglect. In 1537, Christian III embarked on refurbishing the building. This was done with bricks from St. John's Priory. In December 1644, Riberhus was recaptured from its occupying Swedish garrison by an army led by Prince Frederick.

After the Swedish wars in the 17th century, the castle lost its military importance and fell into disrepair. The last lensmand of Riberhus was Otte Krag (1655–1658). Bricks and other building materials from the castle were later used for the renovation of local churches and other construction projects in the area.

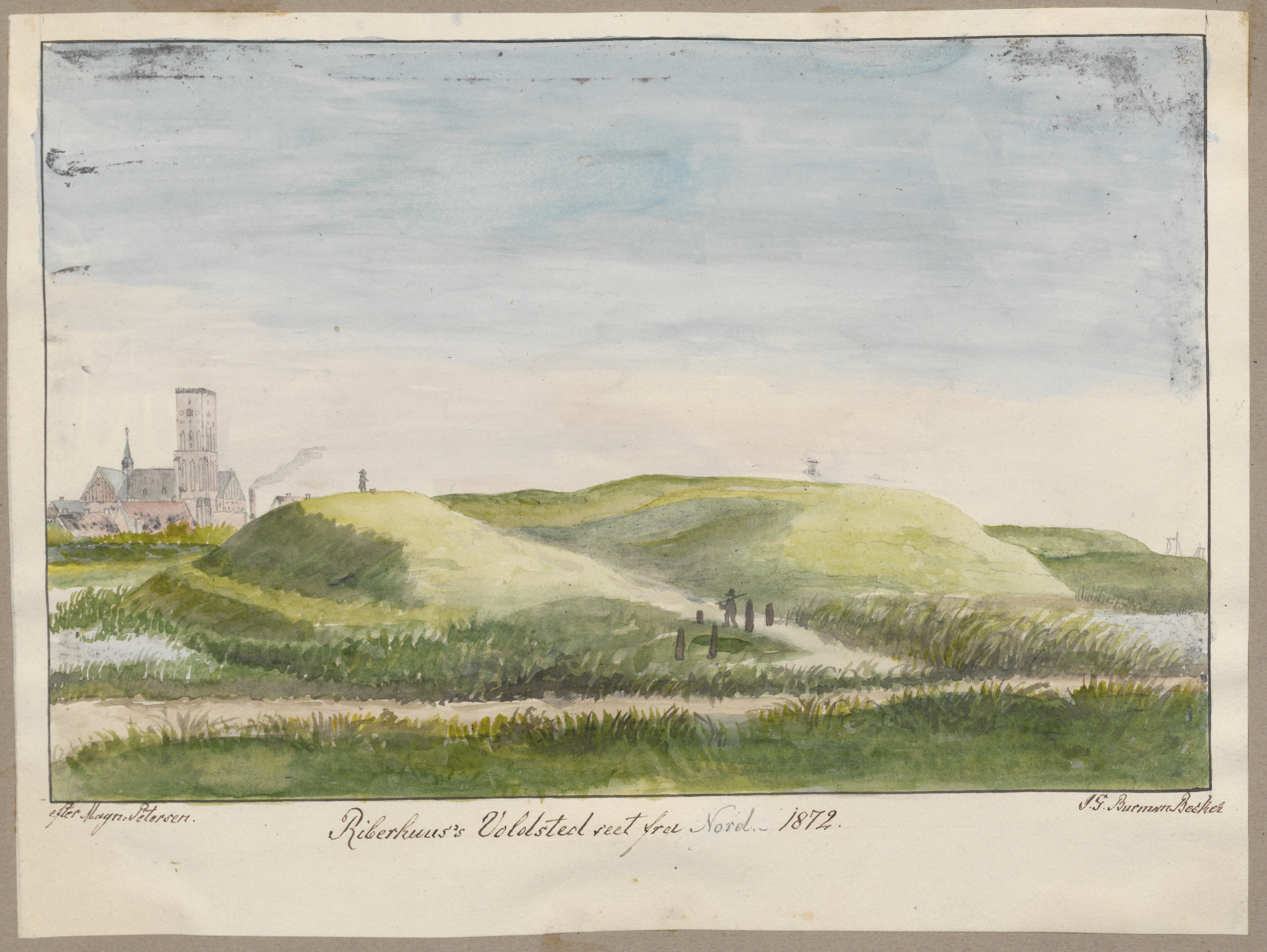
Johann Gottfried Burman Becker: Riberhus Castrle Bank viewed from the north, 1872.

In 1662–1793, Riberhus leant its name to Riberhus Amt.

In 1940–41, the National Museum excavated and restored the site of the grounds.

== Today ==
Riberhus Castle Bank measures approximately 90 metres x 90 metres. It rises approximately eight metres above the surrounding countryside. The remains of Skriverstuen ("The Scribe's House") stands on its eastern corner. A statue of Queen Dagmar stands on the southern corner. It was inaugurated on 24 August 1913. A triangulation station stands on the northern corner.

== Legacy ==
In a number of old Danish folk songs, Riberhus is mentioned as the death place of Queen Dagmar. Mads Pedersen Rostock lamented the sorry state of the castle in 1688. Riberhus is also mentioned in Christian Richardt's 1889 poem Vort land.

A DFDS steam ship was given the name Riberhus in 1875. Another DFDS ship was named after the castle in 1950. Riberhus is also the brand name of an Arla Foods Danbo cheese.

== Works cited ==
- Munthe, Arnold (1908). Klas Fleming, Karl Gustaf Wrangel, Martin Thijsen Anckarhielm, danska kriget 1643–1645: Omfattande tiden juli–december 1644 [Klas Fleming, Karl Gustaf Wrangel, Martin Thijsen Anckarhielm, Danish War 1643—1645: Covering the period July—December 1644] (PDF). Svenska sjöhjältar (in Swedish). Vol. 5:2. Illustrated by Jacob Hägg. Stockholm: P. A. Norstedt & Söners Förlag.
