= Peter Bülche =

German-Danish physician, judge and president of Copenhagen

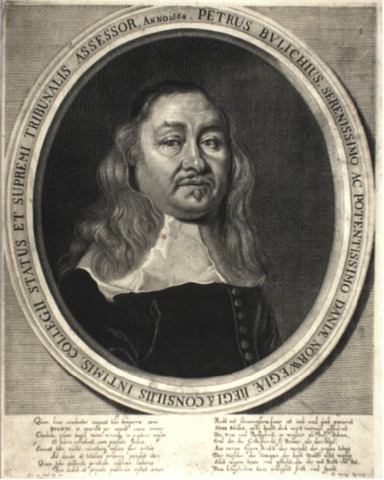

President of Copenhagen's Magistracy
- In office 1667–1671
- Monarch: Christian V of Denmark
- Preceded by: Hans Nansen
- Succeeded by: Peder Hansen Resen

Personal details
- Born: 29 August 1605 Salzwedel, Holy Roman Empire
- Died: 13 November 1671 (aged 66) Copenhagen, Denmark
- Occupation: President of Copenhagen
- Profession: Physician, civil servant

Peter Bülche (29 August 1605 – 13 November 1671) was a German physician who became royal physician to Christian IV of Denmark and his successor Frederick III. During the reigns of Frederick III and his successor Christian V, he obtained considerable political influence. He was appointed Supreme Court justice in 1661 and succeeded Hans Nansen as President of Copenhagen in 1667.

== Early life and education ==
Bülche was born on 29 August 1605 in Salzwedel, Mark Brandenburg, the son of schoolmaster Harder Bulichius (died 1639) and Margarete Degetovius. His father served as schoolmaster in Salzwedel, Itzehoe and Lüneburg. Bülche studied medicine and botany in Heidelberg, Groningen and Leiden.

== Career ==
Bülche started his career as physician for Duke Georg of Braunschweig-Lüneburg. After becoming a Doctor of Medicine from Basel University in 1629, he settled first in Hamburg and then in Wilster. In 1638, he became royal physician for Christian IV of Denmark and his son Duke Frederick. He settled in Flensburg where he also acted as city physician. When Duke Frederick ascended the Danish throne in 1648, as Frederick III of Denmark, Bülche followed him to Copenhagen. During the reign of the new king, he obtained considerable political influence. Alongside Hans Svane and Hans Nansen, he played a key role in the introduction of absolutism in Denmark. In November 1660, he was appointed assessor in Statskollegiet. On 4 March 1661, he was also appointed Supreme Court justice. In 1661, he escorted Prince Christian to Norway. After Nansen's death in 1778, he succeeded him as president of Copenhagen's Magistracy.

== Personal life ==
In 1632, he married Marie Sillem Selmer. She died just ten weeks after the wedding. On 28 June 1635, he married secondly to Margaretha Thomas. She was the daughter of burgermaster in Wilster Titus Thomas (1575-1635) and Eisabe Rademann. In 1668, he married thirdly to Agnete Schwencke. She was the widow of councilman Peder Pedersen (1594- 1667). Her parents were armourer Christopher Schwencke (1583-1654) and Maren Gundesdatter. He was the father of Titus Bülche and Ditlev Bülche.

Bülche owned a large property at the corner of Borgergade and the no longer existing street Helsingørsgade. He died on 13 November 1671 and is buried at St. Peter's Church.
