= Hannibal Sehested =

Hannibal Sehested may refer to:

- Hannibal Sehested (governor) (1609–1666), Danish statesman and Governor of Norway
- Hannibal Sehested (council president) (1842–1924), Danish Council President
