= Councillor =

Member of a local government council

A councillor (or councilor in American English), alternatively councilman, councilwoman, councilperson, or council member, is a person who is a member of a council. This is typically an elected representative of an electoral district in a municipal or regional government, or other local authority. The title of a councillor varies geographically, with a name generally being preceded by their title (or the shortened version Cllr or Cr when written) in formal or council-related situations in many places. In some Indian jurisdictions, notably in municipal corporations, a councillor is referred to as a corporator.

== Finland ==
In Finland councillor (neuvos) is the highest possible title of honour which can be granted by the President of Finland. There are several ranks of councillors and they have existed since the Russian rule. Some examples of different councillors in Finland are as follows:

- Councillor of State: the highest class of the titles of honour
- Mining Councillor/Trade Councillor/Industry Councillor/Economy Councillor: granted to leading industry figures in different fields of the economy

== India ==
As per the Seventy-fourth Amendment of the Constitution of India, municipal governance in India is looked after by elected councillors who are members of either a municipal corporation (for cities) or a municipality (for towns).

== The Philippines ==
Under the Philippine Republic Act No. 7160 (otherwise known as the Local Government Code of 1991), a councilor is a member of a local council that is the legislative body of the local government unit. The English term "councilor" (shortened as "Coun.") term is primarily used to refer to members of barangay, municipal and city councils; in Tagalog, the members of the Sangguniang Barangay (barangay council) and Sangguniang Kabataan (youth council) are called "kagawad", while the members of the Sangguniang Bayan (municipal council) and Sangguniang Panlungsod (city council) are called "konsehal".

Members of the Sangguniang Panlalawigan (provincial board) are never referred to as "councilors" but as "board members" or "Sangguniang Panlalawigan member".

== United Kingdom ==
All local authorities in the United Kingdom are overseen by elected councillors. These include:

1. unitary authorities
2. county councils and district councils
3. parish, town and community councils
4. The Common Council of the City of London (in which councillors are known as aldermen and councilmen)

In 2007 the Electoral Administration Act 2006 reduced the age limit for councillors to 18, leading to younger people standing.

=== Youth councillors ===
Youth councillors are also elected in local areas by organisations that are members of the British Youth Council, such as Salford Youth Council.

=== Remuneration ===
Most councillors are not full-time professionals.

In England, Wales and Northern Ireland most larger borough, unitary authority or county councils do pay them basic allowances and out-of-pocket expenses. In addition, special responsibility allowances are paid to councillors who carry out more senior duties. The basic allowances and special responsibility allowances are theoretically paid to compensate councillors for time spent on council duties and are classed as salaries for tax purposes. Parish, town or community councillors may, since the Local Government Act 2000, be paid for their services.

In Scotland, since 2007, councillors have received a salary of £15,000, as opposed to a series of allowances. This rises annually and as of 1 April 2023 councillor pay in Scotland stands at £20,099 per annum. These are often topped up by special responsibility allowances.

=== Regional government ===
The London Assembly is regarded not as a local authority but as a regional devolved assembly and its members are referred to as Assembly Members, not councillors.

== United States ==
Council member, councilman/councilwoman, councilor, or councillor is a title for a member of a council used in the United States.

In particular, the title is used in the following cases:

- City councils or town councils that do not use the title of alderman.
- County councils or councils in county-equivalents in states that do not style their next-level subdivisions as counties.
- Council of the District of Columbia

== Netherlands ==
In the Netherlands, a member of the municipal council is called a gemeenteraadslid or raadslid. Someone out of this group who is elected to serve on the municipal executive is called a wethouder, which is usually translated as 'alderman' or 'councillor'. The Dutch word for mayor is burgemeester. This is expressed in English as "mayor" or "burgomaster". The municipal executive is referred to collectively as the College van Burgemeester en Wethouders.

== Belgium ==
In Belgium, a member of a municipal council is called a gemeenteraadslid (lit. 'municipal council member') in Dutch, and Conseiller Communal in French. Someone out of this group who is elected to serve on the municipal executive is called a schepen in Dutch or échevin in French. This is usually translated as "alderman" or "councillor" in English. The municipal executive is referred to collectively as the College van Burgemeester en Schepenen or Collège du Bourgmestre et Echevins (lit. 'Collegial Board of Mayor and Aldermen').

== Bangladesh ==
In Bangladesh, a member of the city council is called a Councillor. The Councillor of Bangladesh is a city corporation's ward representatives who are elected City Corporations election by popular vote in every five years. Councilors carry out the developmental works of their elected wards and perform the functions of local government act and assist the City Mayor in all works under the City Corporation and carry out his orders.

== Luxembourg ==
In Luxembourg, an échevin (Luxembourgish: Schäffe, German: Schöffe) is a member of the administration of a Luxembourgian commune.

== Norway ==
In Norway, a member of the municipal council, kommunestyret, is called a kommunestyrerepresentant in Norwegian. The Norwegian word for mayor is ordfører.

== Hong Kong ==
In Hong Kong, members of district councils are also referred to as councillors. Before 1999 the district councils were known as district boards, upon the abolition of the municipal councils (the UrbCo and the RegCo) in December that year. In addition, members of the legislative council are also referred to as councillors. From 1996 to 1998 the Legislative Council were known as "Provisional Legislative Council", upon the abolition of the interim legislature in July 1998.
