= Anna Svane =

Danish merchant (died 1637)

- Born: Anna Hansdatter Svane; Ribe, Denmark
- Died: 9 October 1637; Horsens, Denmark
- Occupation: Merchant
- Spouse: Hans Olufsen Riber (m. 1590; died 1615)
- Children: 7, including Hans Svane
- Father: Hans Svaning

Anna Hansdatter Svane (died 9 October 1637) was a Danish merchant, who founded a home for poor widows called Svaneboligen that was the first of its kind in Horsens and one of the first in Denmark.

== Biography ==
Anna Hansdatter Svane was born in Ribe, and was the youngest of 15 children of historiographer and archdeacon Hans Svaning and Marine Sørensdatter Stage. She grew up in a household that focused on spiritual and intellectual pursuits. On 9 August 1590, she was married to the mayor of Horsens, burgher merchant Hans Olufsen Riber (died 1615). The couple had seven children, two of whom died as infants. Her daughter Anne Svane (c. 1596) was married to mayor of Horsens Ernst von Baden. One son Oluf Svane (c. 1601) became mayor of Horsens like his father. Her youngest son Hans Svane (1606–1668) would become Bishop of the Diocese of Zealand.

After the death of her husband, she took over his business and managed his many properties in Horsens. She became a leading member of the then growing wealthy Danish burgher class. During the sack of Jutland by German troops during the Thirty Years' War in 1627–29, she fled to her son Hans in Frisia, who was studying there at the time. Allegedly during her escape, Svane swore to God that if she ever returned to Horsens, she would help those less fortunate than her. Upon her return to Denmark in 1631, she founded a home for poor widows called Svaneboligen at Fugholm 16 in Horsens. The foundation was the first of its kind in Horsens and one of the first institutions of its kind in Denmark.

Anna Svane died in Horsens on 9 October 1637 and was buried at Horsens Klosterkirke.
