= Scabino =

A scabino (pl. scabini; Latin: scabinus) was a kind of magistrate or alderman in medieval Italy.

== See also ==
- Italian assessors
- Scabinus, the medieval office throughout Continental Europe
