= Danish Court =

Danish Court may refer to:

- the Danish royal family
- the Courts of Denmark
