= Siege of Riberhus =

Part of the Torstenson War

- Part of the Torstenson War
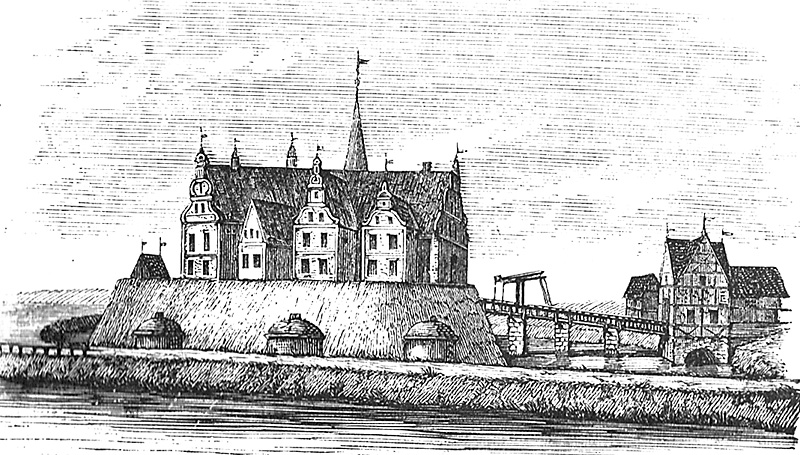
- Depiction of Riberhus by Jens Peter Trap from 1879, based on the Braunii Theatrum Urbium (1587)
Date	22–30 December 1644
Location	Riberhus, Denmark–Norway (present-day Denmark) 55°19′50″N 8°45′25″E
Result	Danish victory
Territorial changes	Riberhus is recaptured by Danish forces

Belligerents
Denmark–Norway	(yes) Swedish Empire

Commanders and leaders
Prince Frederick	(yes) Mortaigne †

Units involved
Holstein army Jutland regiment	(yes) Riberhus garrison

Strength
c. 7,000 men	140–160 men

Casualties and losses
300 killed	Almost everyone killed Some captured

The siege of Riberhus occurred from 22 to 30 December 1644 during the Torstenson War between Denmark and Sweden.

Following a rendevouz at Kolding on 17 December 1644, a Danish army of around 7,000 men began marching toward Ribe to recapture it from its Swedish garrison of 140–160 men. They arrived on 22 December, successfully repelling the Swedish defenders from the town, after which the Swedes withdrew into the fortress of Riberhus.

After the Swedish commander, Mortaigne, refused to surrender, plans for a storming began being drawn up. These plans were finished by 30 December. After three assaults, the fortress was recaptured and most of the garrison was killed.

== Background ==
On 13 December 1643, after months of preparation by Axel Oxenstierna, a Swedish army of 16,000 men invaded Holstein under the command of Lennart Torstensson. The invasion sparked the eponymous Torstenson War between Denmark and Sweden.

In the summer of 1644, Torstensson withdrew from Jutland with his forces. This followed reports that an Imperial army led by Matthias Gallas was on its way north to cut off Torstensson's retreat. As he withdrew, he left garrisons in fortresses around Jutland. (Note: Swedish garrisons were left in Aalborg, Aarhus, Skanderborg, Ribe, Haderslev, Christianspris, Breitenburg, Pinneberg, and Trittau.) By late August, the Danes had mostly taken back control of Jutland.

In September, a detachment from Torstensson's army led by Helmut Wrangel was sent back to Jutland. Wrangel initially attempted to relieve Pinneberg and Breitenburg, which were under siege, but failed. Instead, he captured Kiel, and later recaptured Haderslev and Ribe, installing a small garrison of between 160 and 200 men in the latter.

== Prelude ==
In late November, the Holstein Army, numbering 5,370 men and led by Prince Frederick, cautiously marched from Glückstadt through Schleswig, Flensburg, Aabenraa, and Haderslev. He sent negotiators to Anders Bille on Funen to request as many reinforcements as possible, being promised 1,000 infantry and 500 cavalry. They met near Kolding on 17 December. Instead of attacking along Jutland's eastern coast as Bille hoped, Prince Frederick and his advisors committed to first capturing Ribe.

On 20 December, Prince Frederick left Kolding, marching toward Ribe.

=== Ribe garrison ===
The exact size of the Riberhus garrison is disputed. Historians Christian Axel Jensen and J. Hinch estimated it at 140 men. Swedish historian Arnold Munthe instead estimated some 153 men. Danish historian Frederik Meidell estimated 150–160 men. Citing Theatrum Europaeum, historian Olli Bäckström estimated 160 men. Captured German soldiers from the garrison claimed it consisted of six officers and more than 150 non-commissioned officers and regular soldiers. The garrison was commanded by a Lieutenant named Mortaigne.

== Siege ==
Altogether, Prince Frederick's army, counting his Holsteinian troops, artillery, feudal levies, and volunteers, consisted of some 7,000 men. After two days, the Danish army arrived in Ribe. Prince Frederick immediately requested further reinforcements as he feared Wrangel would come to Ribe's aid. As the Danish army entered the town, 50 German soldiers from the garrison were killed and captured after an unsuccessful defense. These troops had most likely deserted according to Swedish historian Arnold Munthe. Following the unsuccessful defense of the town, the Swedes withdrew into the fortress, Riberhus.

Danish troops took up position in the town's churchyard, keeping fires burning day and night as it was extremely cold. Prince Frederick took up quarters in Councillor Peder Baggesen's house.

Mortaigne refused to surrender following a bombardment, and Prince Frederick held a council of war where it was decided to storm the fortress once preparations had been made.

=== Storming ===
A week later, on 30 December, the storming was carried out by "picked men". This included 500 men from the Jutland regiment and an unknown number of Holsteinian infantry. The fortress was captured following a third assault. Most of the Swedish garrison was killed in the storming, including Mortaigne, except a few who survived and were captured. (Note: Citing a Danish report, Bäckström gives a detailed list of Swedish losses. According to the report, the Swedes suffered 50 killed and captured in the town, and a further 150 killed in the fortress. Additionally, two captains, one major, and lieutenant Mortaigne himself were killed. In terms of those captured, the report gives the regimental quartermaster, one ensign, one lieutenant, and three to four regular soldiers. This is disputed by estimates from Swedish historian Arnold Munthe, who instead estimated that only three Swedes survived.) By comparison, Danish losses amounted to 300 killed, including a lieutenant colonel named Steinberger, who was shot in a trench on 27 December.

== Aftermath ==
Following the capture of Riberhus, Prince Frederick had two choices. Either he could march to Randers and cooperate with Anders Bille in cutting off Wrangel's retreat both the eastern and western coastal road, or unite with Bille in Kolding and march directly at Wrangel along the eastern road. During deliberations with his council of war, many contradictory orders came from King Christian IV himself. The last of them ordered Prince Frederick to return to Kolding, which he did.

However, reports of Wrangel marching toward him arrived on 3 January 1645 and Prince Frederick immediately set out toward Kolding with his army from Riberhus.
