= Scabinus =

Scabinus, sometimes translated as alderman or assessor, was a medieval and early modern municipal office in Continental Europe.

It continued into the present day under a variety of vernacular names:

- échevin or eschevin in French
- scabino in Italian
- Schöffe in German
- Schäffe in Luxembourgish
- schepen in Dutch
- šepmistr in Czech

The equivalent office in southern France and Catalonia was consul or, in Toulouse, capitoul.
