= Hans Svane =

Danish statesman and clergyman (1606–1668)

- Bishop of Zealand
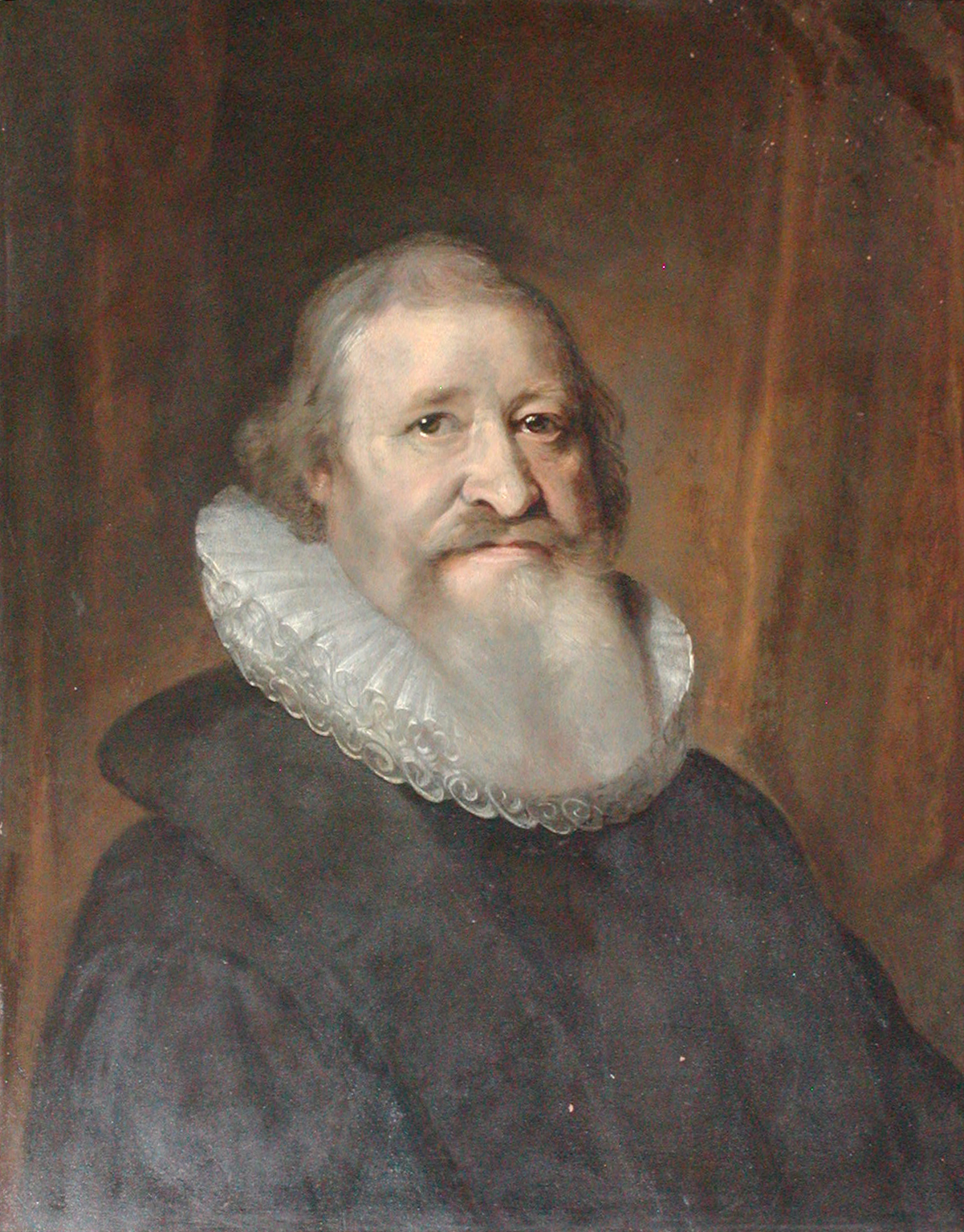
- Church: Church of Denmark
- In office: 1655–1668
- Predecessor: Laurids Mortensen Scavenius
- Successor: Hans Wandal

Personal details
- Born: 27 March 1606 Horsens, Denmark-Norway
- Died: 26 July 1668 (aged 62)
- Denomination: Lutheranism
- Parents: Anna Svane; Hans Olufsen Riber

Hans Svane (Svaning) (27 March 1606 – 26 July 1668) was a Danish statesman and clergy member of the Church of Denmark. He was a professor at the University of Copenhagen from 1635 and Bishop of the Diocese of Zealand from 1655 until his death.

== Biography ==
He was born in Horsens where his father, burgher merchant Hans Olufsen Riber (d. 1615), was burgomaster. His mother, Anna Svane, was a daughter of the historian Hans Svaning, whose surname subsequently altered to Svane, he adopted.

At Copenhagen Svane devoted himself to the study of Oriental languages, and between 1628 and 1635 completed his education abroad, at Franeker in Friesland, Wittenberg, Oxford, and Paris. After seven years' residence abroad Svane returned to occupy the chair of Oriental languages at the University of Copenhagen. In 1646, finding promotion slow, he turned to theology and was created Dr. theol. by his old patron Jesper Brochmand (1585-1652), now Bishop of the Diocese of Zealand, whom he succeeded in the metropolitan see of Denmark on 26 January 1655.

As a theologian he belonged to the severely orthodox Lutheran school. His scholarship, despite the erudition of his commentary to the prophet Daniel in two huge folio volumes, is questionable. But in Latin and Danish he won distinction as a speaker, and his funeral orations in both languages were admired by his contemporaries. At the famous risdag of 1660 he displayed debating talent of a high order and played an important political role. It was Svane who, at the opening of the Rigsdag, proposed that only members of the council of state should be entitled to fiefs and that all other estates should be leased to the highest bidder whatever his social station. During the early and mid 1660s he belonged to the influential circle around Hannibal Sehested, Frederik Ahlefeldt, Peter Bülche, Jacob Petersen and Theodor Lente, who became increasingly opposed to Frederick III's favorite Christoffer Gabel.

At a hint from the king he laboured to get the royal charter abolished and the elective monarchy transformed into an hereditary monarchy. The clerical deputies followed him in a serried band, as the burgesses followed Nansen, and the bishop's palace was one of the meeting-places for the camarilla which was privy to the absolutist designs of Frederick III. Throughout the session Svane was chairman of "the Conjoined Estates" in their attacks upon the nobility, his watchword being: "Equal rights for all and a free hand for the king." It was on his motion (8 October) that the Commons agreed "to offer his majesty the crown as an hereditary crown," to which proposition the nobility acceded, under severe pressure, two days later. When on the 13th, the three estates assembled at the castle, it was Svane's speech, as president of the estate of the clergy, which gave the solemnity its ultra-royalist character. He, too, quashed the timid attempt of the more liberal minded of the deputies to obtain a promise from the king of some sort of a constitution. In fact, excepting the king and queen, nobody contributed so powerfully to the introduction of absolutism into Denmark as the bishop of Copenhagen.

Svane was raised to the dignity of archbishop, a title which no other Danish prelate has since borne, and as president of the academic consistory of the university (an office which was invented for and died with him) he took precedence of the rector magnificus. He was also created a royal councillor, an assessor of the supreme court and a member of the council of state (states kollegiet) . His elevation seems to have turned his head. The university suffered the most from his extravagant pretensions; and his quarrels with all the professors at last caused such a scandal that the king had to interfere personally. A bishop who was at the same time a privy councillor, a minister of state and a judge of the supreme court could have but little time for spiritual duties.

Yet Svane was not altogether neglectful of them. Especially noteworthy is his plan for the erection of a consistorial college for managing all the temporal affairs of the church, including education and poor relief, anticipating to some extent the modern ministries of education and public worship, which unfortunately was not adopted. Moreover, the privileges which he obtained for the clergy did much to increase the welfare and independence of the Church of Denmark in difficult times, while his representations to the king that Danish theology was not likely to be promoted by placing Germans over the heads of native professors bore good fruit.

== Other sources ==
- Detlev Gotthard Zwergius, Sjellandske clerisie (Copenhagen, 1754).
