= Échevin =

Échevin, also anglicized as eschevin, may refer to:

- Échevin (Belgium), a municipal office in present-day Belgium, usually known in English by its Dutch name schepen
- Échevin (France), a municipal office in medieval and early modern northern France
- Échevin (Luxembourg), a municipal office in present-day Luxembourg

== See also ==
- Capitoul, the equivalent office in the city of Toulouse, France
- Consul, the equivalent office in most of southern France and Catalonia
- Jurat, the equivalent office in Bourdeaux, France
- Scabinus (disambiguation), the medieval office throughout Continental Europe
