= Wolfgang Heimbach =

German painter

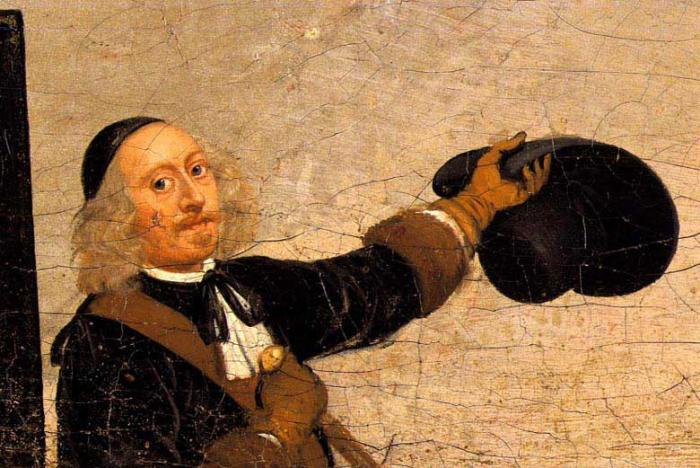
Wolfgang Heimbach, self-portrait, 1666

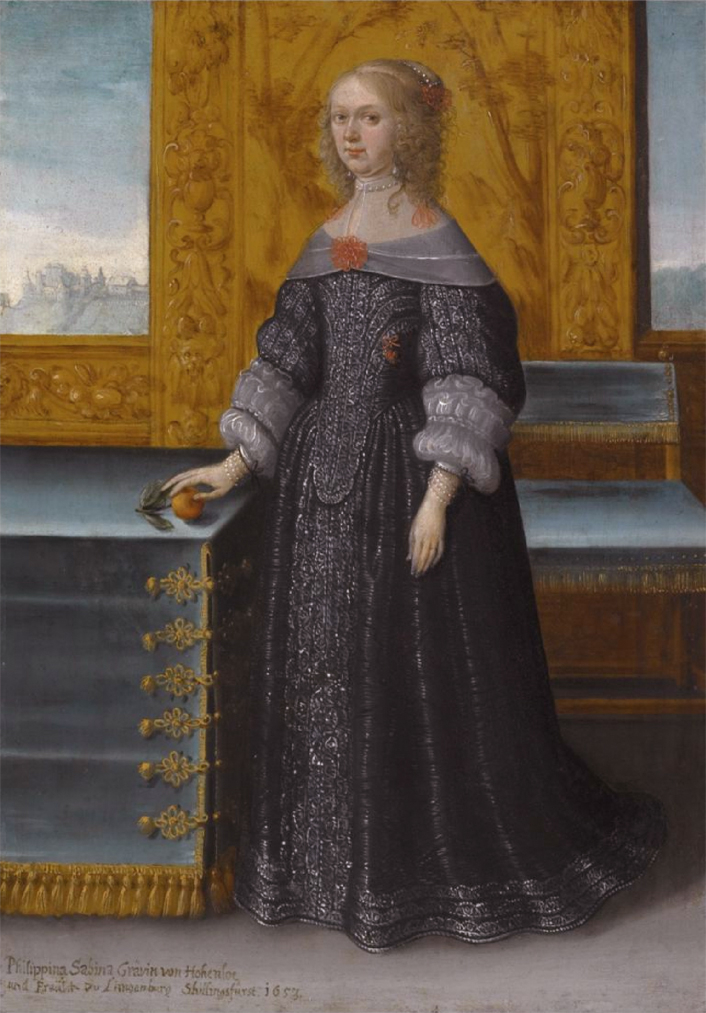
Countess Philippina Sabina von Hohenlohe (1653) by Wolfgang Heimbach

Wolfgang Heimbach (1615 – 1678) was a North German Baroque painter, mostly active in Denmark.

Heimbach was from Oldenburg and studied in Germany and the Low Countries. He was deaf-mute but compensated by being able to read and write several languages. As court painter, he was temporarily in the services of Anton Günter, Count of Oldenburg but remained in the years 1640 to 1651 in Italy. During this period he worked for the noble houses Doria Pamphilj and Medici. From 1653 until at least 1662, he served as court painter to King Frederick III of Denmark-Norway. From 1670 until his death he was in the service of the Prince Bishop of Münster, Christoph Bernhard von Galen.

Heimbach's most important work is his painting of the homage to Frederik III in 1660. The painting, completed in 1666, is an almost photographic report. The artist has put himself in the foreground next to the inscription section; he waves his hat triumphantly. Heimbach left Denmark in 1667; he probably died in Oldenburg.
