= Hans Gram =

Hans Gram may refer to:

- Hans Christian Gram (1853–1938), Danish scientist who invented Gram staining
- Hans Gram (composer) (1754-1804), Danish-American composer and musician
- Hans Gram (historian) (1685–1748), Danish academic

== See also ==
- Hans Gram Holst (1744–1815), Danish-Norwegian army officer
