= Frederick III of Denmark =

King of Denmark and Norway from 1648 to 1670

Frederik III
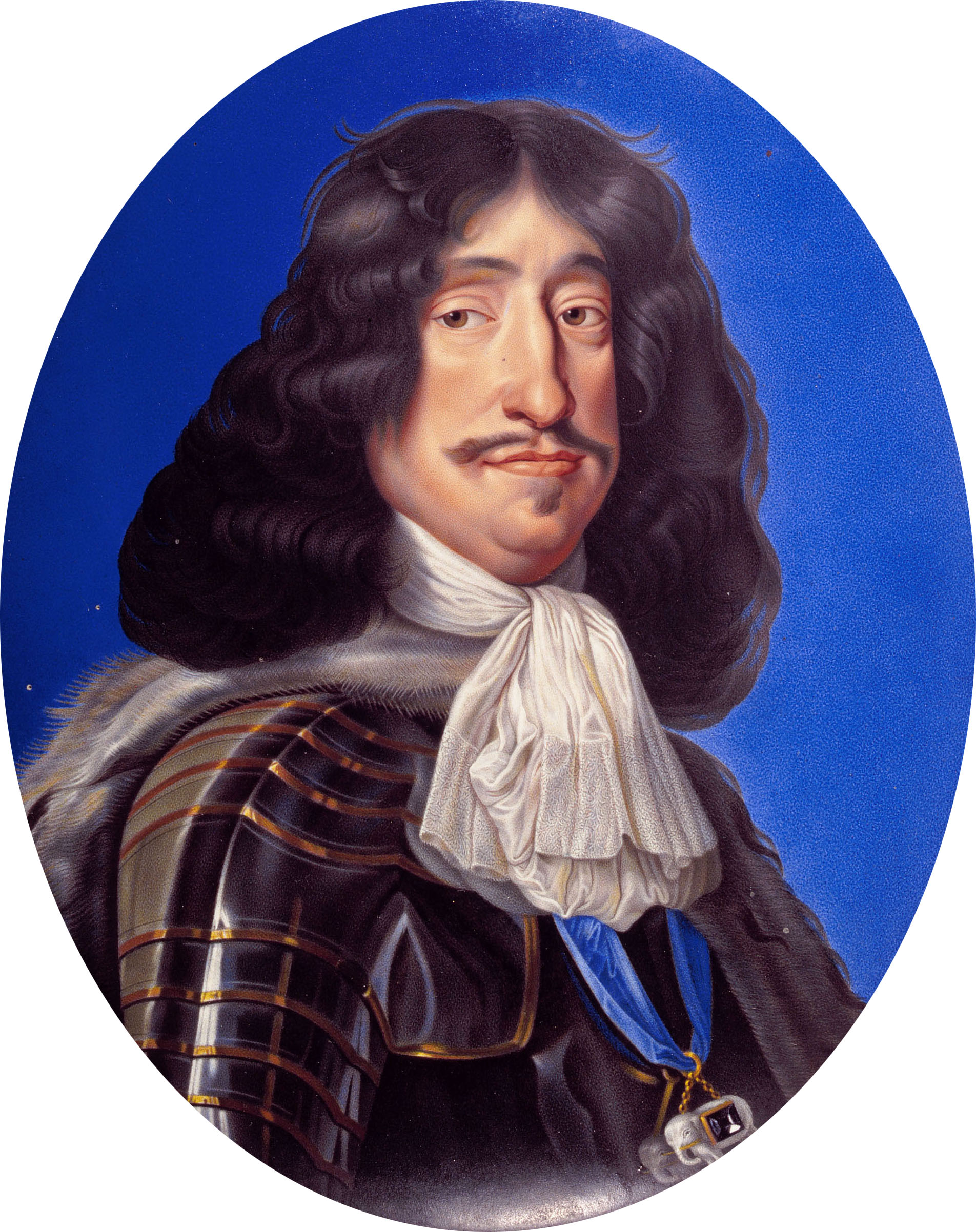
- Portrait by Paul Prieur, 1663

King of Denmark and Norway
- Reign: 6 July 1648 – 9 February 1670
- Coronation: 23 November 1648
- Predecessor: Christian IV
- Successor: Christian V
- Born: 18 March 1609; Haderslevhus Castle, Haderslev, Denmark
- Died: 9 February 1670 (aged 60); Copenhagen Castle, Copenhagen, Denmark
- Burial: Roskilde Cathedral
- Spouse: Sophie Amalie of Brunswick-Lüneburg (m. 1643)
- Issue: Christian V, King of Denmark; Anna Sophie, Electress of Saxony; Frederica Amalia, Duchess of Holstein-Gottorp; Wilhelmina Ernestina, Electress Palatine; Prince George, Duke of Cumberland; Ulrike Eleonora, Queen of Sweden; Ulrik Frederik Gyldenløve (illegitimate)
- House: Oldenburg
- Father: Christian IV of Denmark
- Mother: Anne Catherine of Brandenburg
- Religion: Lutheran

Frederick III (Danish: Frederik; 18 March 1609 – 9 February 1670) was King of Denmark and Norway from 1648 until his death in 1670. He also governed under the name Frederik II as diocesan administrator (colloquially referred to as prince-bishop) of the Prince-Bishopric of Verden (1623–29 and again 1634–44), and the Prince-Archbishopric of Bremen (1635–45).

The second-eldest son of Christian IV and Anne Catherine of Brandenburg, Frederick was only considered an heir to the throne after the death of his older brother Prince Christian in 1647. He instituted absolute monarchy in Denmark–Norway in 1660, confirmed by law in 1665 as the first in Western historiography. He also ordered the creation of the Throne Chair of Denmark.

After failed and costly aggressive wars under Christian IV, most Danes did not want to go to war again. According to Cathal Nolan, when Frederick III became king in 1648, he was excluded from the talks leading to the Peace of Westphalia and had to watch as Bremen was lost to rivaling Sweden, also freed from paying Oresund Tolls. In order to be elected king after the death of his father, Frederick III conceded significant influence to the nobility. As king, he fought losing wars against Sweden. He was defeated in the Dano-Swedish War of 1657–1658, and in the Dano-Swedish War of 1658–1660. However, when it seemed like king Charles X Gustav of Sweden was about to suffer a catastrophic defeat in the Second Northern War, Frederick III declared war on Sweden. Unexpectedly, Charles X Gustav crossed the frozen Belts to Zealand and appeared with 5,000 men near Copenhagen. Frederick III was unprepared and forced to sign the Treaty of Roskilde.

Frederick disbanded the elective monarchy in favour of absolute monarchy, which lasted until 1814 in Norway and 1848 in Denmark. He married Sophie Amalie of Brunswick-Lüneburg, with whom he fathered Christian V of Denmark.

== Early years ==
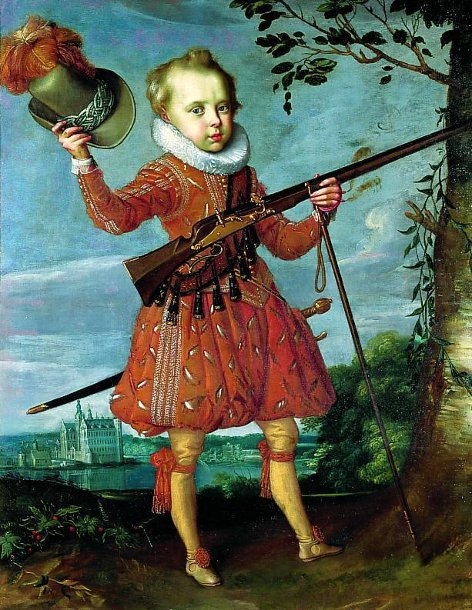
Duke Frederick, painting by Pieter Isaacsz

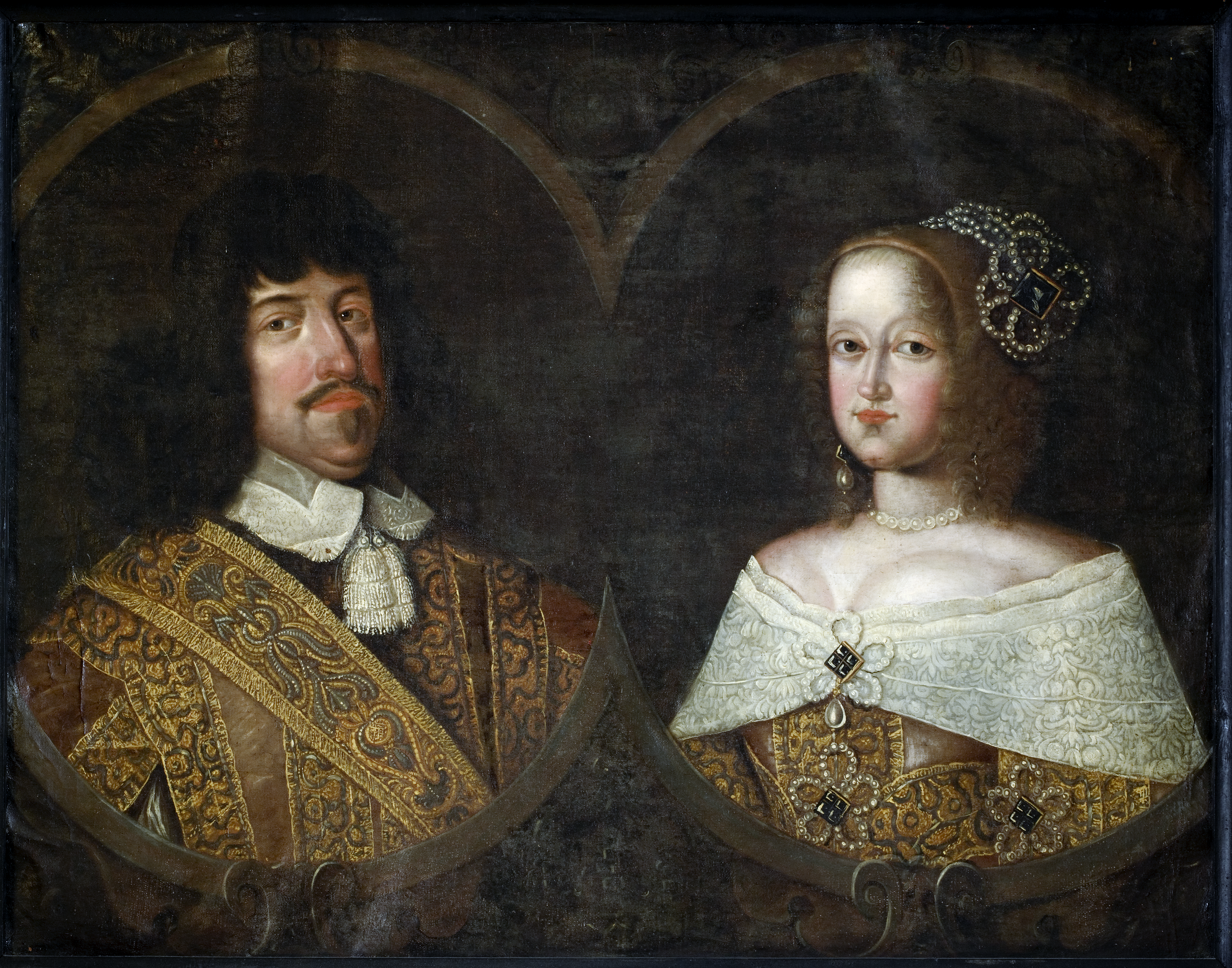
Double portrait of Frederik III of Denmark and his wife Sofia Amalia of Braunschweig-Lyneburg, probably painted shortly after their marriage 1643.

Frederick was born at Haderslev in Slesvig, the son of Christian IV and Anne Catherine of Brandenburg. In his youth and early manhood, there was no prospect of his ascending the Danish-Norwegian throne, as his older brother Christian was elected heir apparent of Denmark in 1608, and was proclaimed as heir apparent of Norway in 1610.

During his early childhood, he was raised under the supervision of Beate Huitfeldt. Frederick was educated at Sorø Academy and studied in the Netherlands and France. As a young man, he demonstrated an interest in theology, natural sciences, and Scandinavian history. He was a reserved and enigmatic prince who seldom laughed, spoke little, and wrote less, a striking contrast to Christian IV. Even though he lacked the impulsive and jovial qualities of his father, Frederick possessed the compensating virtues of moderation and self-control. On 1 October 1643 Frederick wed Sophie Amalie of Brunswick-Lüneburg, the daughter of George, Duke of Brunswick-Lüneburg, who had an energetic, passionate, and ambitious character. He was an enthusiastic collector of books and his collection became the foundation for the Copenhagen Royal Library.

=== Early offices ===
In his youth, Frederick became the instrument of his father's political schemes in the Holy Roman Empire. He was granted administration of the Prince-Archbishopric of Bremen (1635–45), the Prince-Bishopric of Verden (1623–29 and again 1634–44), and named coadjutor of the Bishopric of Halberstadt. Thus, from an early age, he had considerable experience as an administrator. At the age of eighteen, he was the chief commandant of the Bremian fortress of Stade. During the Torstenson War of 1643–45, Frederick led the siege of Riberhus and later lost control of his possessions within the empire. He was then appointed commander in the royal shares in the Duchies of Schleswig and Holstein by his father. His command was not successful, chiefly owing to his quarrels with the Earl-Marshal Anders Bille, who commanded the Danish forces. This was Frederick's first collision with the Danish nobility, who afterwards regarded him with extreme distrust.

== Reign ==
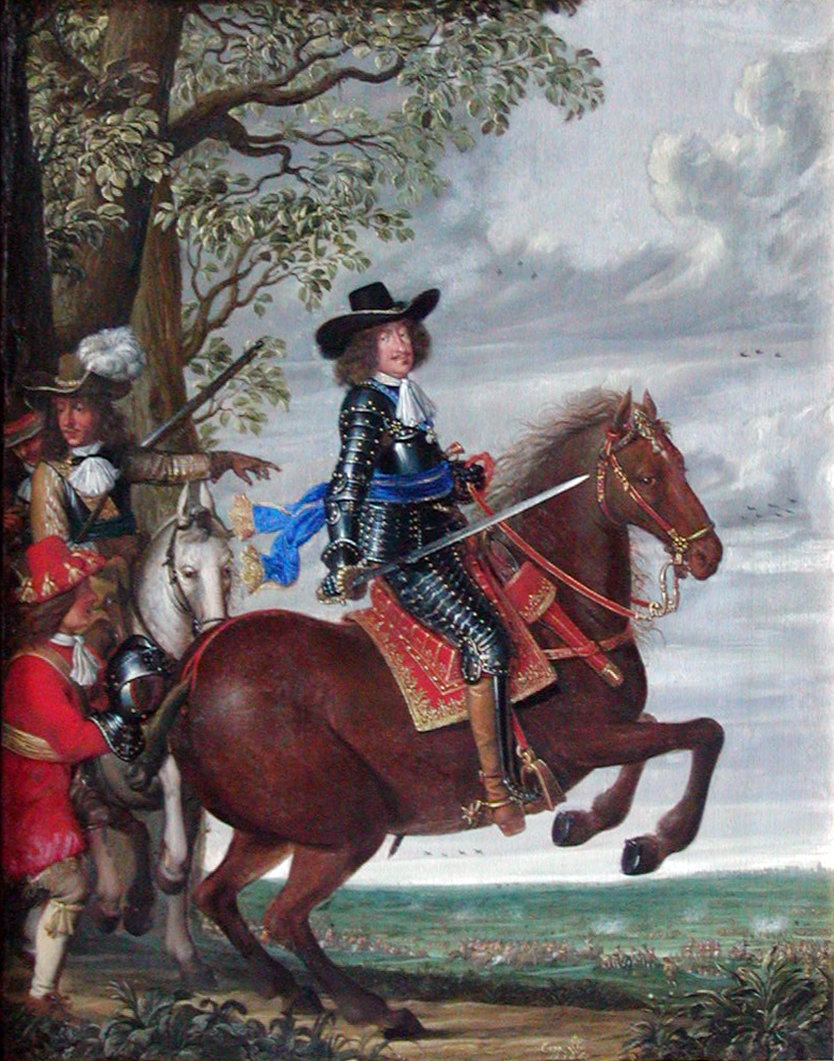
King Frederik III on horseback.Painting by Wolfgang Heimbach.

=== Proclaimed king ===
The death of his elder brother Christian in June 1647 opened the possibility for Frederick to be elected heir apparent to the Danish-Norwegian throne. However, this issue was still unsettled when Christian IV died on 28 February 1648. After long deliberation among the Danish Estates and in Rigsraadet (royal council), he was finally accepted as his father's successor. On 6 July, Frederick received the homage of his subjects, and he was crowned on 23 November. However, due to misgivings about the rule of Christian IV, as well as Frederick's previous confrontational administrations in Bremen and Verden and his quarrels with Anders Bille, he was only elected after he had signed a Haandfæstning charter. The Haandfæstning included provisions curtailing the already diminished royal prerogative in favour of increased influence for the Rigsraadet.

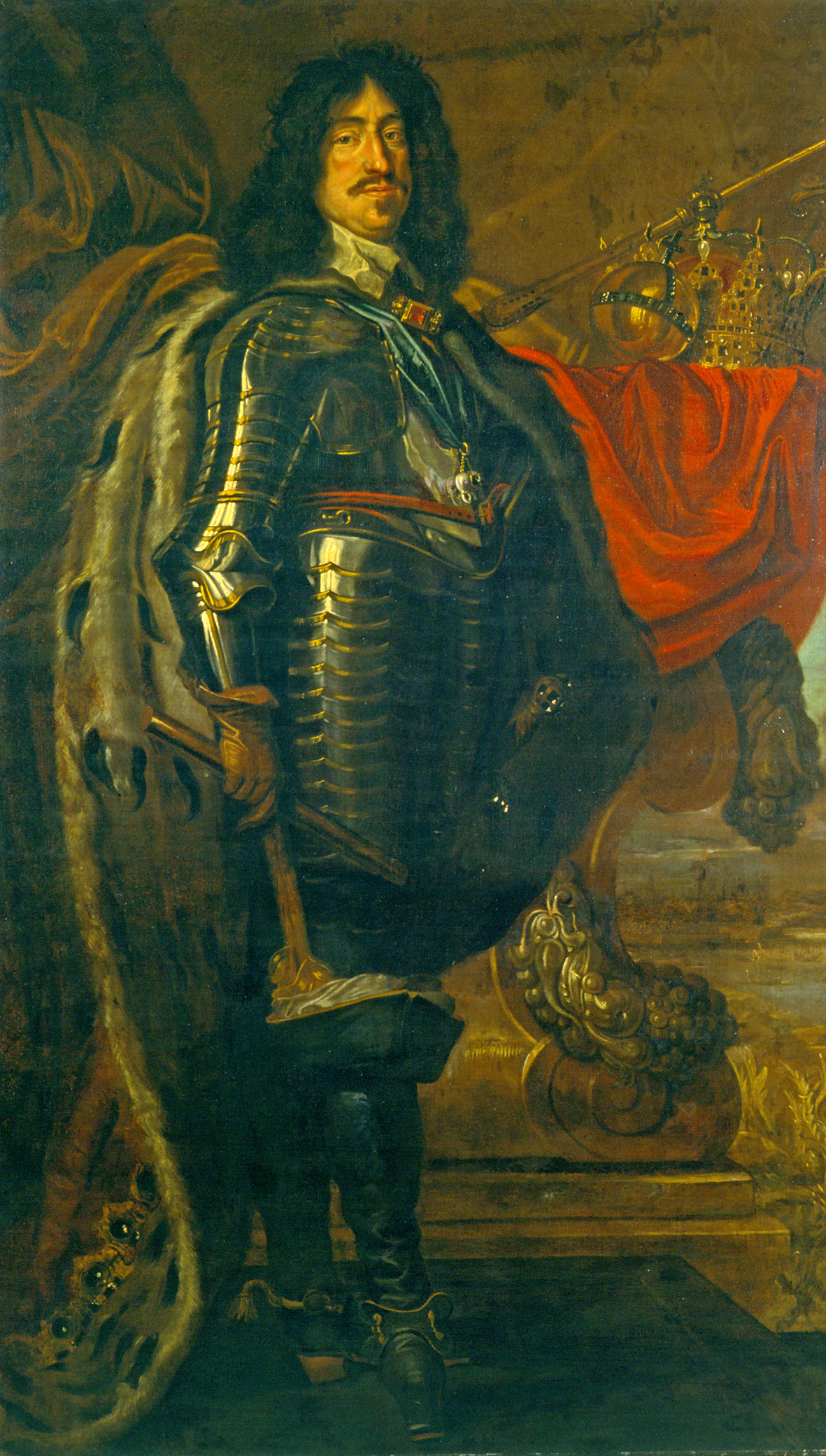
Portrait by Karel van Mander III, 1656

In the first years of his reign, Rigsraadet was the main power center of Danish politics. However, Frederick wielded more effective power than what the Haandfæstning officially granted. He eventually succeeded in removing the two most influential members of Rigsraadet from office in 1651: his brothers-in-law Corfitz Ulfeldt and Hannibal Sehested. Ulfeldt went into exile in Sweden where he turned traitor, while Sehested was restored to favour in 1660.

=== Defeated by Sweden ===
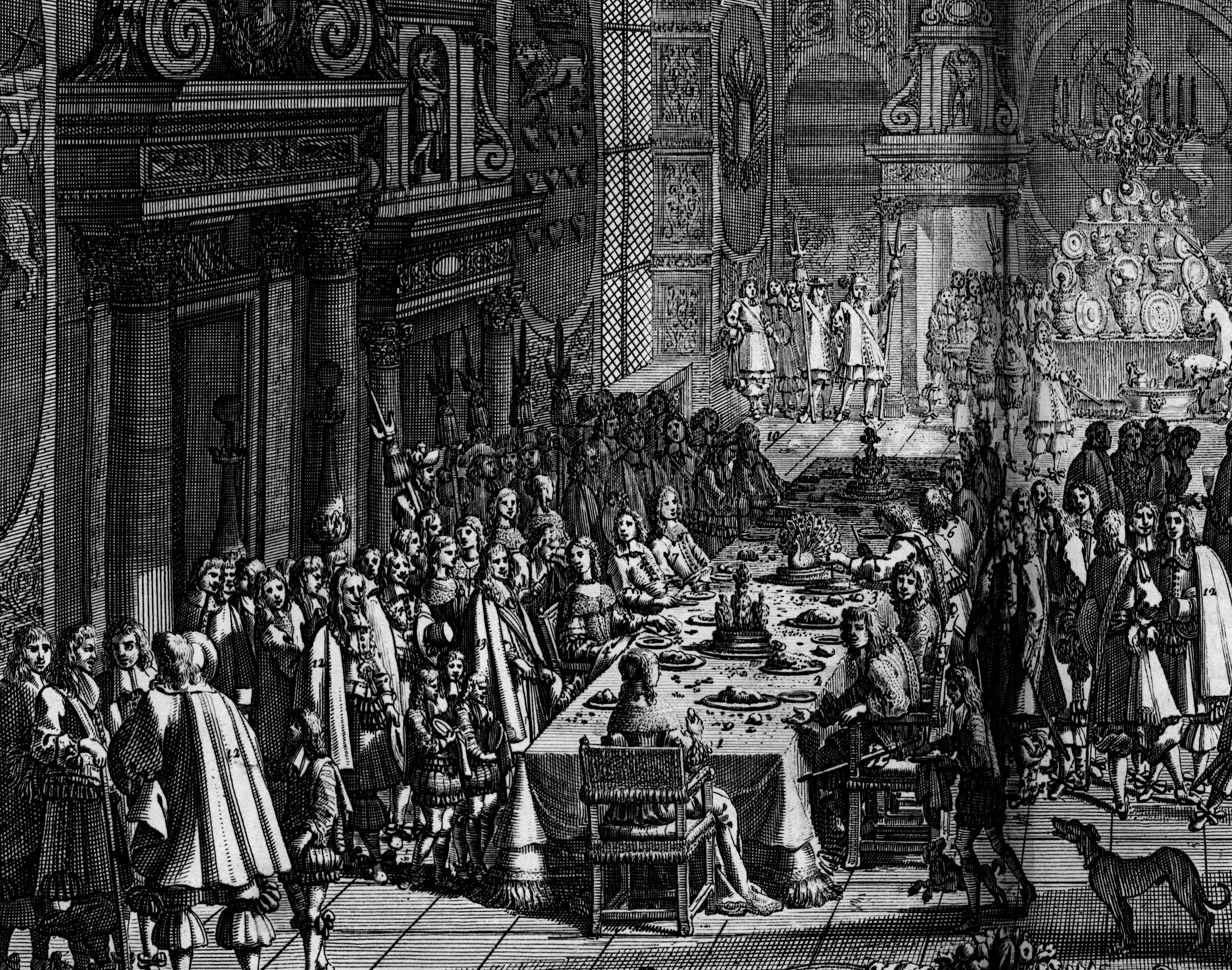
The peace banquet (Fredstaffelet) at Frederiksborg Castle following the signing of the Treaty of Roskilde in 1658.

With all his good qualities, Frederick was not a man to recognize fully his own limitations and that of his country. But he rightly regarded the accession of Charles X of Sweden on 6 June 1654 as a source of danger to Denmark–Norway. He felt that temperament and policy would combine to make Charles an aggressive warrior-king: the only uncertainty was in which direction he would turn his arms first. Charles's invasion of Poland in July 1655 came as a distinct relief to Frederick, even though the Polish War was full of latent peril to Denmark. Frederick was resolved upon a rupture with Sweden at the first convenient opportunity. When Rigsdagen assembled on 23 February 1657, it willingly granted considerable subsidies for mobilization and other military expenses. On 23 April he received the assent of the majority of Rigsraadet to attack Sweden's German dominions. In the beginning of May, the still pending negotiations with that power were broken off, and on 1 June Frederick signed the manifesto justifying a war, which was never formally declared.

The Swedish king confounded all the plans of his enemies with the March across the Belts in January and February 1658. The effect of this unheard-of achievement of crossing the frozen sea to invade Danish territory was crushing. Frederick at once sued for peace. Yielding to the persuasions of the English and French ministers, Charles finally agreed to be content with mutilating, instead of annihilating, the Danish monarchy. The Treaty of Taastrup was signed on 18 February and the Treaty of Roskilde on 26 February 1658. The conclusion of peace was followed by a remarkable episode. Frederick expressed the desire to make the personal acquaintance of his conqueror and Charles X consented to be his guest for three days, 3 to 5 March, at Frederiksborg Palace. Splendid banquets lasting far into the night and intimate conversations between princes who had only just emerged from a mortal struggle seemed to point to nothing but peace and friendship in the future.

=== Assault on Copenhagen repelled ===
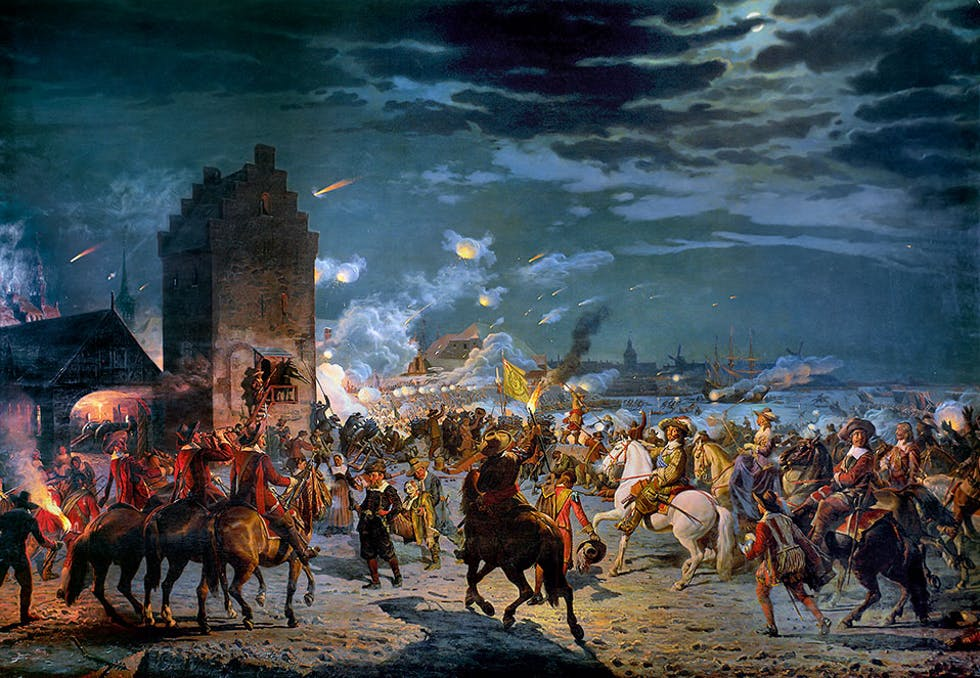
Frederick III on his white stallion at the Assault on Copenhagen. Painted by Frederik Christian Lund, 1887.

Charles's suspicion of Denmark–Norway led him to a further assault on his neighbor. Terror was the first feeling produced at Copenhagen by the landing of the main Swedish army at Korsør on Zealand on 17 July 1658. None had anticipated the possibility of such a sudden and brutal attack, and everyone knew that the Danish capital was very inadequately fortified and garrisoned.

During this war, Frederick attained great popularity in the general public for rebuking the advice of his counsellors to flee Copenhagen with the famous words "I will die in my nest," actively leading the defense of the city. On 8 August, representatives from all Estates in the capital urged the necessity of a vigorous resistance, and the citizens of Copenhagen, headed by the mayor Hans Nansen, protested their unshakable loyalty to the king and their determination to defend Copenhagen to the utmost. The Danes had only three weeks of warning of the approaching danger, and the vast and dilapidated line of defense had at first only 2,000 regular defenders. The government and the people displayed exceptional zeal under the constant supervision of the king and queen and mayor Nansen. By the beginning of September, all the breaches were repaired, the walls were armed with cannons, and 7,000 men were under arms.

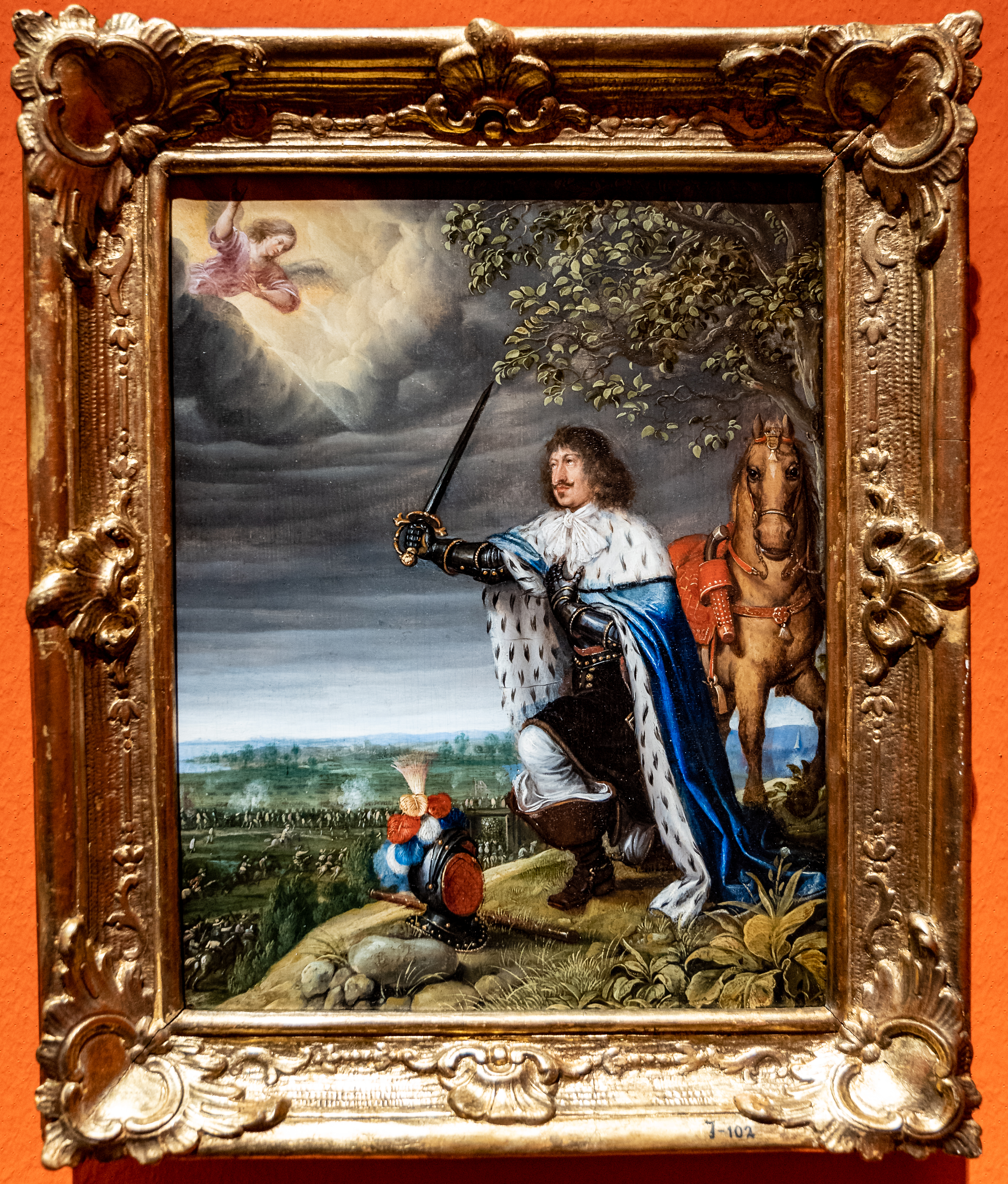
Frederik III during the battle of Nyborg. Painted by Wolfgang Heimbach, 1659. However, Frederik III did not himself attend the battle, making this an effective piece of propaganda

So strong was the city by this time that Charles X, abandoning his original intention of carrying the place by assault, began a regular siege. This he also was forced to abandon when an auxiliary Dutch fleet reinforced and reprovisioned the garrison and defeated him on 29 October in the Battle of the Sound. The Dutch then assisted in the liberation of the Danish Isles in 1659. Thus, the Danish capital had saved the Danish monarchy. The war was ended by the Treaty of Copenhagen in May 1660, which confirmed the cession of Scania, Halland, and Blekinge from the Treaty of Roskilde, while Bornholm and parts of Schleswig reverted to Denmark.

=== Absolute monarchy ===
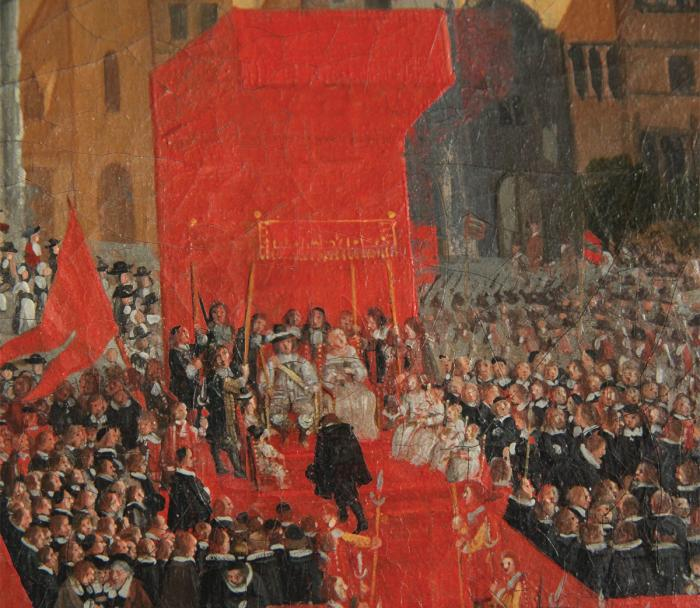
Paying homage to the hereditary king in front of the Castle of Copenhagen, 18 October 1660. Painted by Wolfgang Heimbach, 1666

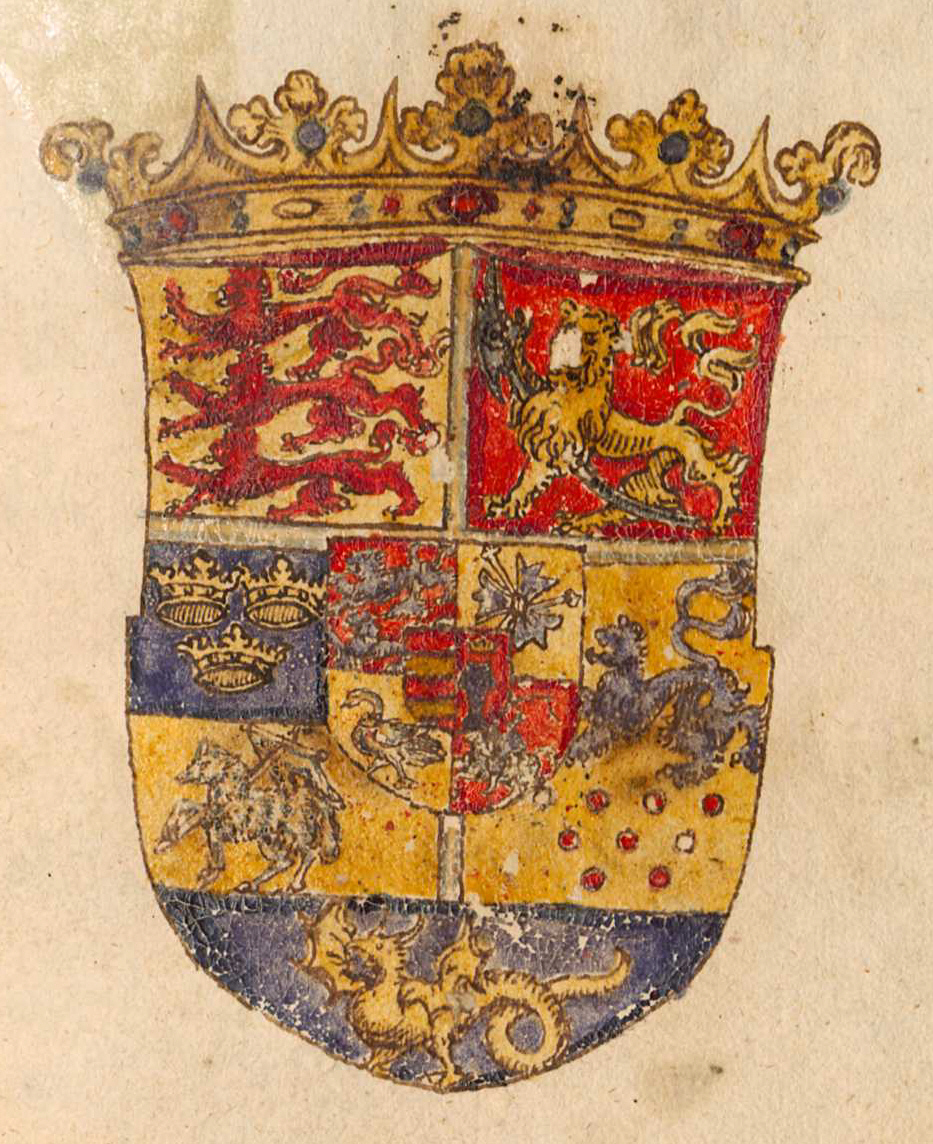
Frederick's Coat of Arms

Frederick III profited by his spirited defense of the common interests of the country and the dynasty. The traditional loyalty of the Danish middle classes was transformed into enthusiasm for the king personally, and for a brief period Frederick found himself the most popular man in his kingdom. He made use of his popularity by converting the elective monarchy into an absolute monarchy by the Revolution of 1660. To ensure this conversion he instituted the 1660 state of emergency in Denmark. At the September 1660 gathering of the Estates, intended to solve the financial problems faced after the wars, Frederick played the different Estates against each other. He succeeded in gaining support for the hereditary monarchy, the annulment of the Haandfæstning, and the institution of absolute monarchical rule by decree.

During the last ten years of his reign, the king again took a relative obscure position while the new monarchy was built up and the country's people tried to recover after the wars. New men came into government, which was marked by a rivalry between the ministers and councillors like Hannibal Sehested and the king's favourite Kristoffer Gabel. During the early and mid 1660s there was an influential circle around Sehested, Frederik Ahlefeldt, Peter Bülche, Hans Svane, Jacob Petersen and Theodor Lente, who became increasingly opposed to Gabel. Frederick concentrated on changing the administrative structure from chancellery to resort colleges and replaced the administrative divisions of fiefs with amt counties. In 1665, the Kongeloven (Lex Regia) was introduced: the “constitution” of Danish-Norwegian absolute monarchy, and the first assertion of divine right underpinned by a written constitution in Europe. It decreed that the Monarch "shall from this day forth be revered and considered the most perfect and supreme person on the Earth by all his subjects, standing above all human laws and having no judge above his person, neither in spiritual nor temporal matters, except God alone." This law consequently authorized the king to abolish all other centers of power. Most important was the abolition of the Council of the Realm.

In 1665, Frederick had an opportunity to repay the Netherlands for their support, by protecting the Return Fleet from the Dutch East Indies from the English navy. The English had blocked the English Channel, forcing the Return Fleet to sail all around the British Isles. The Dutch took refuge in Bergen, Norway, pursued by English warships. There they were protected by the fortress at the harbor, whose commander treated them as Danish allies. The English urged Frederick to seize the Return Fleet for himself, claiming that it was more valuable than the whole of his kingdom. Instead of protecting the Dutch, Frederick agreed to collaborate with the English in seizing the Return Fleet. But before the Danish-Norwegian fleet or word of the deal reached Bergen, the English attacked, and were defeated in the Battle of Vågen by the Dutch, supported by the fortress.

Frederick III died at Copenhagen Castle and is interred in Roskilde Cathedral.

== Marriage and issue ==
Frederick married Sophie Amalie of Brunswick-Lüneburg in Castle Glücksburg on 1 October 1643. The marriage had been arranged in 1640. Frederick was, at the time, archbishop of Bremen and not heir to the throne, and was not expected to succeed to the throne. The couple had eight children:

Name	Birth	Death	Notes
King Christian V	15 April 1646	26 August 1699	Married, 1667, Charlotte Amalie of Hesse-Kassel; had issue, including King Frederick IV
Princess Anna Sophie	1 September 1647	1 July 1717	Married, 1666, John George III, Elector of Saxony; had issue.
Princess Frederica Amalia	11 April 1649	30 October 1704	Married, 1667, Christian Albert, Duke of Holstein-Gottorp; had issue.
Princess Wilhelmine Ernestine	21 June 1650	22 April 1706	Married, 1671, Charles II, Elector Palatine. No issue.
Prince Frederick	11 October 1651	14 March 1652	Died in infancy.
Prince George, Duke of Cumberland	2 April 1653	28 October 1708	Married, 1683, Queen Anne of Great Britain. All their children died young.
Princess Ulrika Eleonora	11 September 1656	26 July 1693	Married, 1680, King Charles XI of Sweden.
Princess Dorothea	16 November 1657	15 May 1658	Died in infancy.
Dates in this table are Gregorian.

Also, he had with Margarethe von Pape one illegitimate son, Ulrik Frederik Gyldenløve.

== Works cited ==
- Munthe, Arnold (1908). Klas Fleming, Karl Gustaf Wrangel, Martin Thijsen Anckarhielm, danska kriget 1643–1645: Omfattande tiden juli–december 1644 [Klas Fleming, Karl Gustaf Wrangel, Martin Thijsen Anckarhielm, Danish War 1643—1645: Covering the period July—December 1644] (PDF). Svenska sjöhjältar (in Swedish). Vol. 5:2. Illustrated by Jacob Hägg. Stockholm: P. A. Norstedt & Söners Förlag.

Frederick III House of Oldenburg Born: 18 March 1609 in Haderslev Died: 19 February 1670 in Copenhagen
Regnal titles
Preceded by Christian IV	King of Denmark and Norway; 1648–1670	Succeeded by Christian V
Preceded by Anthony Günther	Count of Oldenburg; 1667–1670	Succeeded by Christian V
Preceded by Christian IV and Frederick III	Duke of Holstein and Duke of Schleswig; 1648–1670 with Frederick III (Gottorp) (1616–1659); Christian Albert (1659–1695)	Succeeded by Christian V and Christian Albert
Preceded by Philip Sigismund as Lutheran administrator	Administrator of the Prince-Bishopric of Verden as Frederick II; 1623–1629	Vacant Title next held by Francis William as Catholic prince-bishop
Vacant Title last held by John Frederick as Lutheran administrator	Administrator of the Prince-Bishopric of Verden as Frederick II; 1635–1644	Secularised into the Principality of Verden
Vacant Title last held by John Frederick as Lutheran administrator	Administrator of the Prince-Archbishopric of Bremen as Frederick II; 1635–1645	Succeeded by Leopold William as Catholic administrator
