= Assessor =

An assessor may be:

- Assessor (fish), a genus of fishes
- Assessor (law), the assistant to a judge or magistrate
- Assessor (Oxford), a senior officer of the University of Oxford
- Assessor (property), an expert who calculates the value of property
- Collegiate Assessor, a civil rank in Imperial Russia
- Assessor (Italy), a member of the executive board in Italian local government
- Scabinus (disambiguation) or its various derived offices, in English translation
- Assessor (horse)

== See also ==
- Possession (disambiguation)
