= Hans Svaning =

Danish historian

Hans Svaning (1503 – 20 September 1584) was a Danish historian.

== Biography ==
Svaning was born at the village of Svaninge on Funen. He attended Vor Frue skole in Copenhagen and the University of Wittenberg graduating in 1529 and in 1533 receiving his master's degree. Between 1541–52, he was the tutor of Prince Frederick, later King Frederick II of Denmark and became a royal historiographer in 1553. In 1539 he became professor of rhetoric at the University of Copenhagen. In 1547, he received the deanery at Ribe. His main work was a complete Danish history in Latin, Danmarkshistorie, which was completed in manuscript in 1579 and stored in the University of Copenhagen Library but lost in the Copenhagen Fire of 1728. Svaning died in Ribe in 1584, aged 81 years.
