= Hannibal Sehested (governor) =

Danish diplomat and governor-general of Norway (1609–1666)

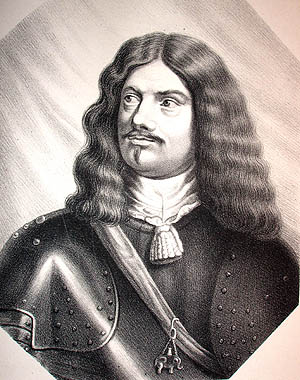

Governor-general of Norway
- In office 1642–1651
- Monarchs: Christian IV, Frederick III
- Preceded by: Christoffer Urne
- Succeeded by: Gregers Krabbe

Personal details
- Born: 1609 Arensborg, Øsel, Denmark-Norway
- Died: September 23, 1666 (aged 56–57) Copenhagen, Denmark-Norway
- Awards: Knight of the Elephant (1648)

Hannibal Sehested (1609 – 23 September 1666) was a Danish statesman and son-in-law of King Christian IV. He served as Governor-general of Norway (then part of Denmark-Norway) from 1642 to 1651. He fought in the Torstenson War against Sweden and implemented many reforms in Norway. After a fall from grace leading to his resignation as Governor-general in 1651, he regained the trust of Frederick III in 1660 and negotiated the Treaty of Copenhagen. He worked as lord treasurer and councillor of state until his death in 1666.

== Early life ==
Sehested was born at Arensborg Castle on Øsel, in Danish Estonia, as the son of Claus Maltesen Sehested (1558–1612) and Anne Nielsdatter Lykke (1568–1645). He was named after his maternal uncle Hannibal Mogensen Gyldenstjerne of Restrup. He was brother of, amongst others, Malte Sehested, Mogens Sehested and Karen Sehested. He attended the Sorø Academy from 1626 to 1629, and then studied abroad in Germany, Holland, France and England from 1629 to 1639. After completing his education abroad, he returned to Denmark and was attached to the court of King Christian IV. In 1639 he was granted the fiefdom of Tranekær, and in 1640 he received the far more lucrative Båhus fiefdom in Norway and was also appointed member of the Danish National Council.

In 1640 and 1641 he was sent to Wismar to negotiate a treaty with the Swedish chancellor, Axel Oxenstierna, and, if possible, to bring about the marriage of Christian's son Frederick and Gustavus Adolphus's daughter Christina. Though failing in both particulars, he retained the favor of the king, who had marked him out as a son-in-law, one of seven by whose influence he hoped to increase the influence of the crown. Accordingly, in 1636 he was betrothed to one of the daughters, the countess Christine, then aged nine, whom he married in 1642.

In May 1640, Sehested became a member of the Rigsråd in Denmark. He believed that the proper field for the exercise of his talents was diplomacy, and he openly aspired to be minister of foreign affairs. Despite a successful embassy to Spain in 1640–1641, he did not obtain the coveted post, but was appointed Governor-General of Norway.

== Governor-general of Norway under Christian IV ==
In April 1642 he was appointed Governor-General of Norway, where he served until 1651. He now had the opportunity of displaying his administrative and organizing abilities, united with a remarkable zeal for reform. He made it his main objective to develop Norway's material resources, reorganize the army, fortifications and fiscal system; and he aimed at giving the country a more independent position in the union with Denmark.

=== Hannibal War ===
During Christian IV's second war with Sweden (1643–1645), Sehested, as Governor-general of Norway, assisted his father-in-law materially. He invaded Sweden four times; successfully defended Norway from attack; and, though without any particular military talent, won an engagement at Nysaker in 1644. The war was unpopular with Norway and was referred to in Norway as the Hannibal war. Concerns centered around high taxes required to support the army and the concern that Sweden would be induced to invade Norway. As part of the peace settlement at Brömsebro, Jemtland and Herjedalen, both Norwegian provinces, were ceded to Sweden by Denmark-Norway with Sehested's acquiescence.

After the war he renewed his reforming efforts, and during the years 1646–1647 strove to withdraw his governorship from the benumbing influence of the central administration at Copenhagen, and succeeded with the help of Christian IV in creating a separate defensive fleet for Norway and giving her partial control of her own finances. He was considerably assisted in his endeavours by the fact that Norway was regarded as the hereditary possession of the Kings of Denmark-Norway. As Governor-general of Norway, he was the virtual ruler of Norway during the two months which elapsed between the death of Christian IV and the election of Frederick III (6 July 1648).

=== Fall from favor ===
At the same time, Sehested freely used his immense wealth and official position to accumulate for himself property and privileges of all sorts. His successes finally excited the envy and disapprobation of the Danish Rigsraad, especially of his rival, Korfits Ulfeldt, also one of the king's sons-in-law. The quarrel became acute when Sehested's semi-independent administration of the finances of Norway infringed upon Ulfeldt's functions as lord treasurer of the whole realm. In November 1647, Ulfeldt carried his point, and a decree was issued that henceforth the Norwegian leaders should send their rents and taxes direct to Copenhagen.

== Governor-general of Norway under Frederick III ==
On the accession of Frederick III (1648) to the throne, Sehested strove hard to win his favor, but an investigation into his accounts as governor conducted by his enemies brought to light such wholesale embezzlement and peculation that he was summoned to appear before a herredag, or assembly of notables in May 1651 to give an account of his whole administration. Unable to meet the charges brought against him, he compromised matters by resigning his governorship and his senatorship, and surrendering all his private property in Norway to the crown.

== After the fall ==
Throughout his trial, Sehested had shown prudence. He gave back three times what he had embezzled. Calculating on the sympathy of Frederick III for a man of his monarchical tendencies, he had nothing to do with the projects of revenge which were the ruin of Korfits Ulfeldt. From 1651 to 1660, he lived abroad. At the end of 1655, he met the exiled Charles II of England at Cologne and lived a part of the following year with him in the Spanish Netherlands. In the summer of 1657, he returned to Denmark, but Frederick III refused to receive him, and he hastily quit Copenhagen. During the crisis of the Second Northern War of 1658, he was at the headquarters of Charles X of Sweden. In seeking the help and protection of the worst enemy of his country, Sehested approached the very verge of treason, but he never quite went beyond it. When, at last, it seemed probable that the war would not result in the annihilation of Denmark-Norway, Sehested strained every nerve to secure his own future by working in the interests of his native land while still residing in Sweden.

== Final years ==
In April 1660, he obtained permission from Frederick III to come to Copenhagen and was finally instructed by him to negotiate with the Swedes. The Treaty of Copenhagen, which saved the honour of Denmark-Norway and brought her repose, was very largely Sehested's work. He was one of the willing abettors of Frederick III during the emergency of 1660, when he re-entered the Danish-Norwegian service as lord treasurer and councilor of state. Both at home and on his frequent foreign missions, he displayed all his old ability. Politically, he played a major role in those years within the queen Sophie Amalie's party, which included men like Jacob Petersen. He was challenged by new rivals like Kristoffer Gabel and his influence seems to have been somewhat fading during his last years but he remained in office until his death. As a diplomat, he in some ways anticipated the views of Peter, count Griffenfeldt, supporting the policy of friendship with Sweden and a French alliance. He died suddenly in Paris, where he was conducting important negotiations. His political testament is perhaps the best testimony to his liberal and statesmanlike views.

== Other Sources ==
- which in turn cites:
  - Thyra Sehested, Hannibal Sehested (Copenhagen, 1886)
  - Julius Albert Fridericia, Adelsvældens sidste Dage (Copenhagen, 1894)
- Carl Olaf Bøggild Andersen (1946) Hannibal Sehested: en dansk statsmand (Universitetsforlaget i Århus)
