= 1637 in Denmark =

- Decades: 1610s; 1620s; 1630s; 1640s; 1650s
- See also: Other events of 1637; List of years in Denmark

Events from the year 1637 in Denmark.

== Incumbents ==
- Monarch – Christian IV

== Events ==
- February – A contract was signed with a Henrik van Dingklage in Emden for the supply of bricks for the construction of Rundetårn in Copenhagen. The first three shiploads are to be delivered in May, the next three loads the following month and the remainder on demand.

=== Undated ===
- Corfitz Ulfeldt is appointed as Governor of Copenhagen.

== Births ==
=== Full date missing ===
- Dieterich Buxtehude, composer (died 1707)
- Ove Ramel, landowner (died 1685)

== Deaths ==
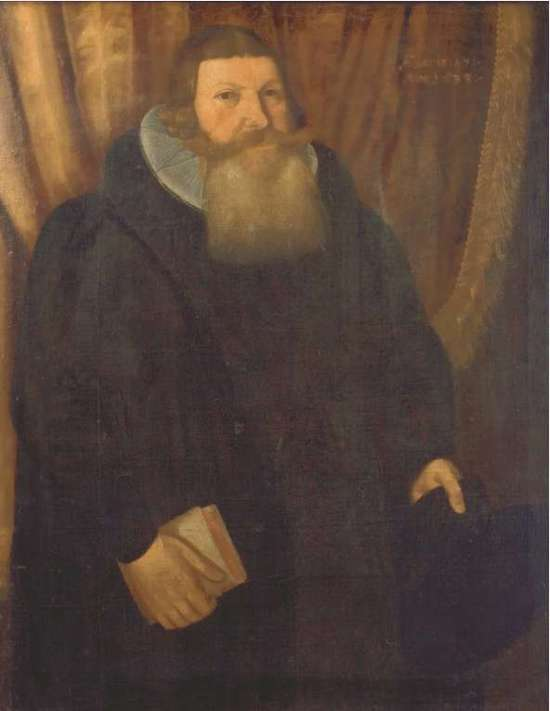
Anders Arrebo.

- 12 March – Anders Arrebo, bishop (born 1587)
- 18 March – Dorothea Elisabeth Christiansdatter, daughter of Christian IV (born 1629)
- 9 October – Anna Svane, merchant (born c. 1573)

== Publications ==
- Christen Sørensen Longomontanus: Coronis Problematica ex Mysteriis trium Numerorum
