= 1638 in Denmark =

- Decades: 1610s; 1620s; 1630s; 1640s; 1650s
- See also: Other events of 1638; List of years in Denmark

The following events occurred in Denmark in the year 1638.

== Incumbents ==
- Monarch – Christian IV

== Events ==
- Sorø is incorporated as a market town.
- Peder Winstrup is installed as Bishop of Lund.
- Jesper Brochmand is installed as Bishop of Zealand.

== Culture ==
=== Art ===
- Henrik Werner completes the Orebygård altarpiece.
- Abraham Wuchters moves to Denmark and created a portrait of Christian IV.
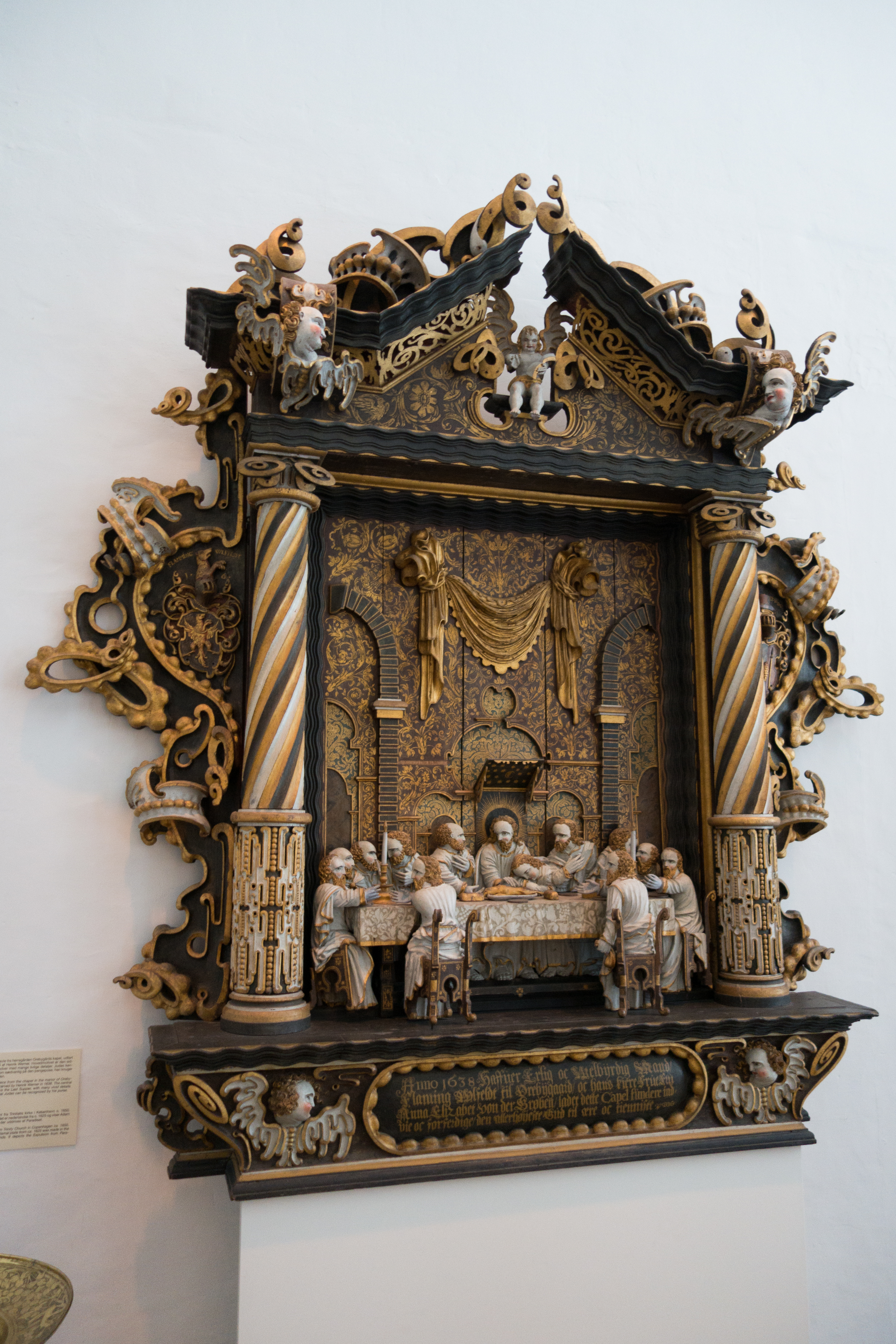
Orebygård altarpiece

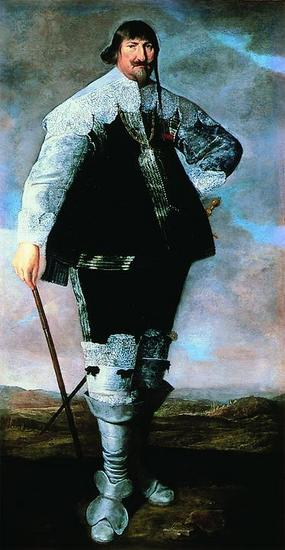
Abraham Wuchters' 1638 portrait of Christian IV.

== Publications ==
- Christen Sørensen Longomontanus, Problemata duo Geometrica
- Jesper Brochmand, Päpstischer Warheit (1638)
- Jesper Brochmand, Sabbati sanctificatio aller Gudelig Betaenkning over alle Evangelier og Epistler paa Sondage og alle hellige Dage

== Births ==
- 1 January – Nicolas Steno, scientist (died 1686)
- 25 February – Jørgen Iversen Dyppel, governor of St. Thomas in the Danish West Indies (died 1683)
- 20 July – Ulrik Frederik Gyldenløve, statesman (died 1704).
- 23 December – Birgitte Skeel, landowner (died 1699)

Full date missing

- Brita Scheel, noblewoman (died 1699)

== Deaths ==
- Hans Poulsen Resen, clergy (born 1561)
