= 1700 in Denmark =

- Decades: 1680s; 1690s; 1700s; 1710s; 1720s
- See also: Other events of 1700; List of years in Denmark

Events from the year 1700 in Denmark.

== Incumbents ==
- Monarch – Frederick IV
- Grand Chancellor – Conrad von Reventlow

== Events ==
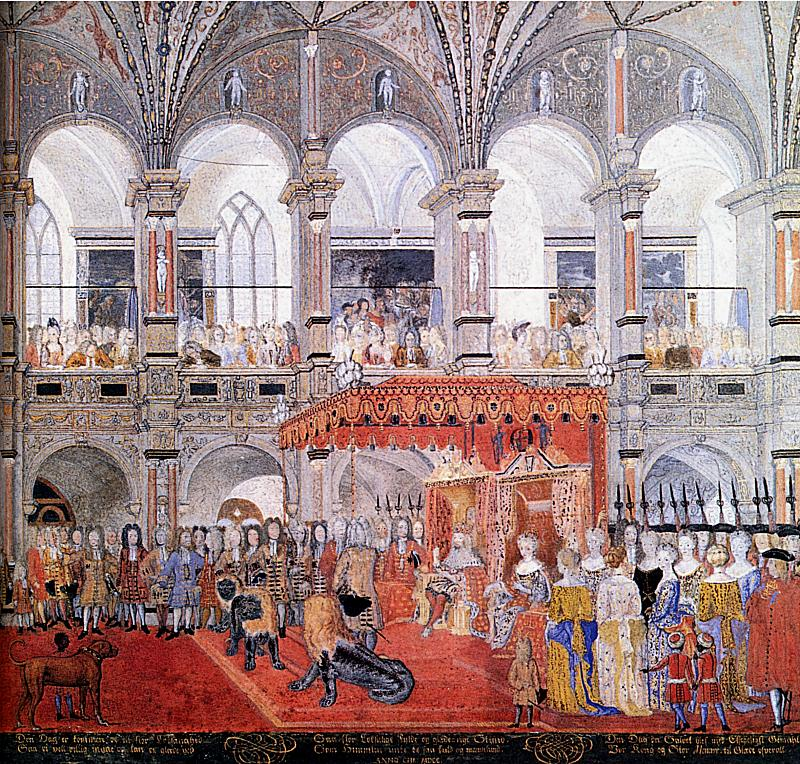
5 April: The coronation of King Frederick IV and Queen Louise

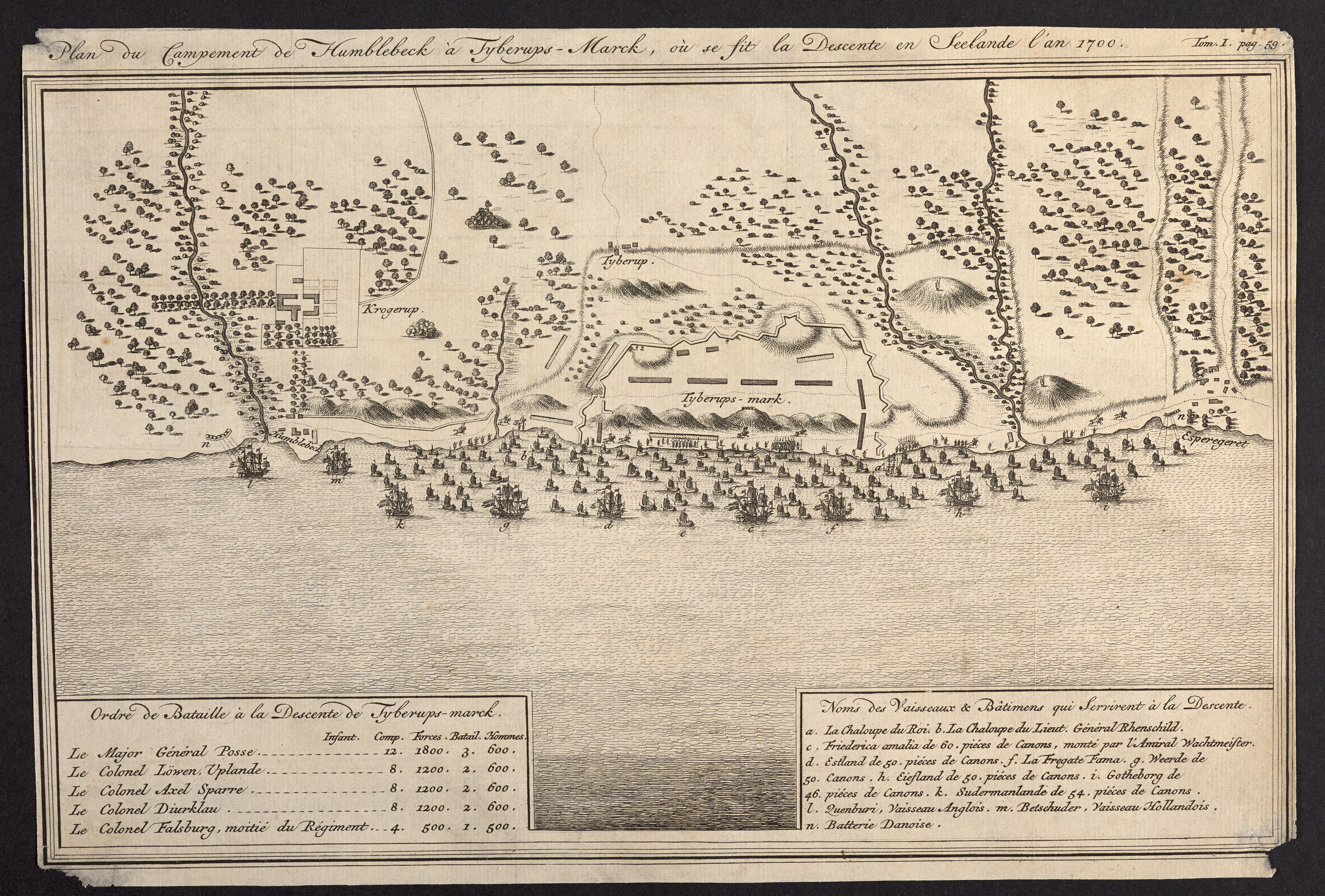
4 August: The Landing at Humlebæk.

- 18 February – Instigated by Ole Rømer, Denmark adopts the Gregorian calendar, although not the Catholic Church's lunar cycle, in place of the Julian calendar.
- February – The Great Northern War breaks out and will last until 1721. Russia has joined a Danish-Polish coalition the previous year against Sweden which forms an alliance with Frederick IV, Duke of Holstein-Gottorp.
- 5 April – The coronation of Frederick IV and Queen Louise at Frederiksborg Castle.
- 4 August – The Landing at Humlebæk: The Swedish King Charles XII lands with an army at Humlebæk north of Copenhagen.
- 12 March – The Swedish troops marches from Humlebæk towards Copenhagen to siege the city.
- 17 August – The Peace of Travendal is concluded when Denmark signs a peace treaty at Traventhal House in Holstein. Denmark has to withdraw from Holstein and Sweden withdraws from Denmark. The peace will last for the next 10 years.

=== Undated ===
- Henrik Brockenhuus, landowner (died 1803)
- Benoît Le Coffre becomes Painter to the Danish Court.
- The first Danish census takes place from 1700 to 17001 but only statistical information about adult men is included. Only about half of it still exists.

== Births ==
14 March – Olfert Fas Fischer, naval officer (died 1761)

- 3 May - Frederik Adeler, government official and landowner (d. 1766)

== Deaths ==
- 5 March – Just Ebel, army officer (born 1620)

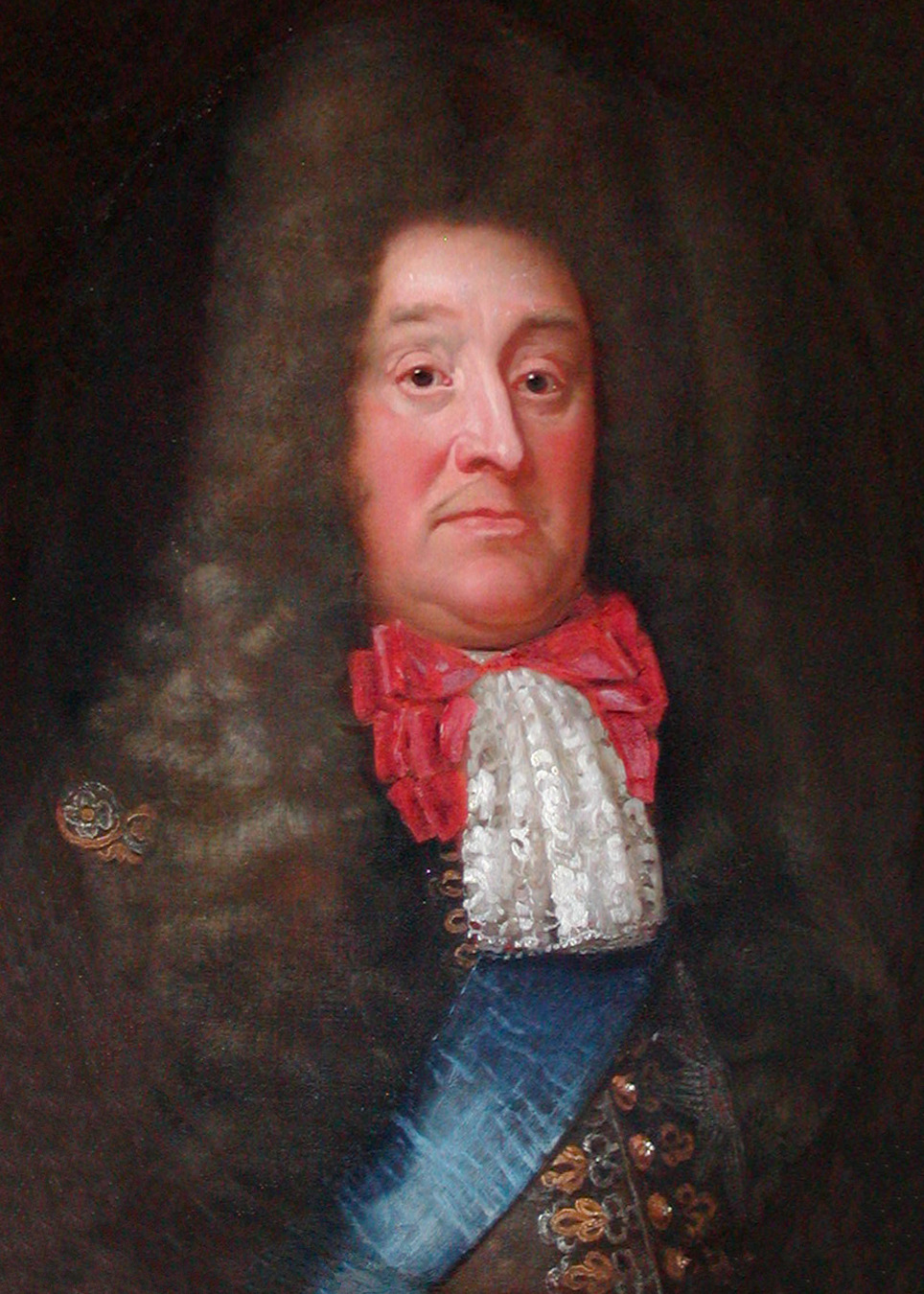
Jens Juel.

- 13 May – Henrik Gerner, clergy (born 1629)
- 23 May – Jens Juel, diplomat, statesman (b, 1631)

=== Full date unknown ===
- Hans van Steenwinckel the Youngest, architect (b. 1639)
