= 1636 in Denmark =

- Decades: 1610s; 1620s; 1630s; 1640s; 1650s
- See also: Other events of 1636; List of years in Denmark

Events from the year 1636 in Denmark.

== Incumbents ==
- Monarch – Christian IV

== Births ==
=== Full date missing ===
- Christian Jørgensen Kruse, government official (died 1699)
- Otto Grote zu Schauen, statesman (died 1693)

== Publications ==
- Ole Worm: Runir seu Danica literatura antiquissima ("Runes: the oldest Danish literature")
- Christen Sørensen Longomontanus: Disputatio de Matheseos Indole
