= 1627 in Denmark =

- Decades: 1600s; 1610s; 1620s; 1630s; 1640s
- See also: Other events of 1627; List of years in Denmark

Events from the year 1627 in Denmark.

== Incumbents ==
- Monarch – Christian IV

== Events ==
- Ole Worm succeeds Hans Poulsen Resen as rector of the University of Copenhagen.

== Births ==
- 29 May – Nikolaj Nissen, judge and landowner (died 1684)
- 4 June – Eiler Holck, nobleman and military officer (died 1696)
- 12 October – Matthias Foss, bishop (died 1683)
- 24 December – Michael Vibe, judge (died 1690)

== Deaths ==
- 13 May – Alexander, Duke of Schleswig-Holstein-Sonderburg, nobleman (born 1573)

== Publications ==
- Christen Sørensen Longomontanus: De Chronolabio Historico, seu de Tempore Disputationes tres
