= 1626 in Denmark =

- Decades: 1600s; 1610s; 1620s; 1630s; 1640s
- See also: Other events of 1626; List of years in Denmark

Events from the year 1626 in Denmark.

== Incumbents ==
- Monarch – Christian IV

== Events ==
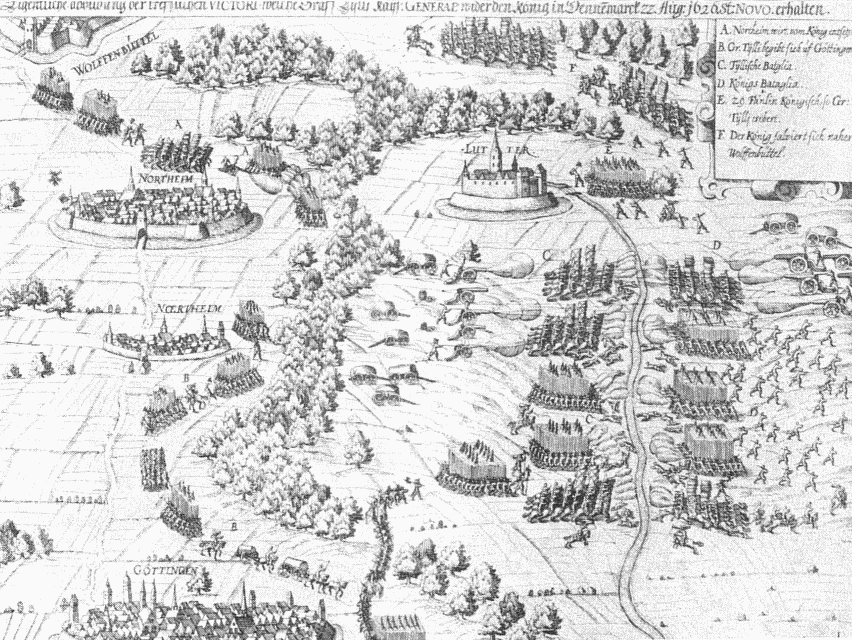
Depiction of the Battle of Lutter, which saw members of the Catholic League defeat an army led by Christian IV of Denmark in 1626

- 27 August – The Battle of Lutter.
- 25 April – The Battle of Dessau Bridge.

=== Undated ===
- Christian IV initiates the construction of Sankt Annæ Skans on the coast north of Copenhagen.
- Hans Poulsen Resen succeeds Christen Sørensen Longomontanus as rector of the University of Copenhagen.

== Births ==
- 7 April – Ole Borch, scientist, physician, grammarian, and poet (died 1690)
- 15 July Christiane Sehested, daughter of Christian IV (died 1670)
- 15 July – Hedevig Ulfeldt daughter of Christian IV (died 1678)

=== Full date missing ===
- Christian Foss, physician and Supreme Court justice (died 1680)
- Abel Cathrine, courtier and philanthropist (died 1676)

== Deaths ==
=== Full date unknown ===
- Hans Nielsen, composer (born 1559)
