= 1701 in Denmark =

- Decades: 1680s; 1690s; 1700s; 1710s; 1720s
- See also: Other events of 1701; List of years in Denmark

Events from the year 1701 in Denmark.

== Incumbents ==
- Monarch – Frederick IV
- Grand Chancellor – Conrad von Reventlow

== Events ==
- 26 April – Commodore C. T. Sehested adjourns as the first chief of the new Royal Danish Naval Academy. The institution is created with inspiration from similar institutions in the Netherlands and France.

=== Undated ===
- A Danish Auxiliary Corps of 8,000 soldiers is garrisoned in Saxony, protecting the hereditary lands of August the Strong,
- Ole Rømer proposes the Rømer scale.
- 25 May – Christian Gyldenløve marries Dorothea Krag in Copenhagen.

== Births ==
- 23 February – Johannes Valeur, judge and vice mayor of Copenhagen (died 1771)
- 4 (or 22) June – Nicolai Eigtved, architect (died 1754)
- 23 September – Bredo von Munthe af Morgenstierne, civil servant, Supreme Court justice and landowner (died 1757)
- 28 September – Stephen Hansen, industrialist, businessman and General War Commissioner (died 1770)

== Deaths ==
=== Full date missing ===
- December – Henrik Ehm, industrialist, coppersmith and alchemist
- Adriaen Foly, painter (born 1664)
- Oliger Jacobaeus, professor, physician and naturalist
