= 1632 in Denmark =

- Decades: 1610s; 1620s; 1630s; 1640s; 1650s
- See also: Other events of 1632; List of years in Denmark

Events from the year 1632 in Denmark.

== Incumbents ==
- Monarch – Christian IV

== Events ==
=== Undated ===
- Christian IV starts the construction of the fortification Christianspris north of Kiel.

== Births ==
- 24 August – Peder Griffenfeld, statesman and royal favourite (died 1699)

== Deaths ==
- 20 December – Melchior Borchgrevinck composer (born 1572)
