= 1639 in Denmark =

- Decades: 1610s; 1620s; 1630s; 1640s; 1650s
- See also: Other events of 1639; List of years in Denmark

Events from the year 1639 in Denmark.

== Incumbents ==
- Monarch – Christian IV

== Events ==
=== Undated ===
- The Rosborg witch trials begin and continue until 1642.
- The first of the two Golden Horns of Gallehus is found. The second one will be found close by in 1734.

== Births ==
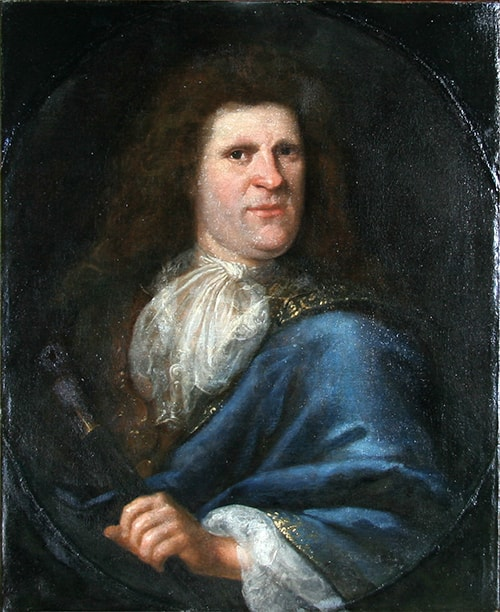
Claus Rasch.

- 7 October – Johann Gottfried Becker, pharmacist (died 1711)
- 23 August – Claus Rasch, chief of police (died 1705)

== Deaths ==
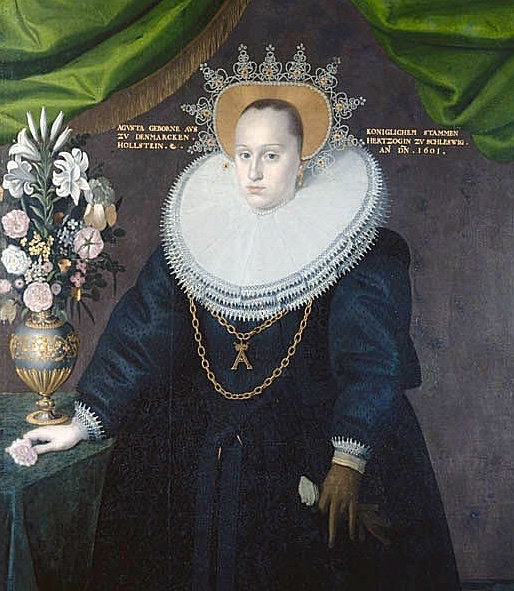
Augusta of Denmark.

- 12 January – Reinhold Timm, painter
- 5 February – Augusta of Denmark, princess (born 1580)
- 9 April – Albret Skeel, nobleman (born 1572)
- 6 August – Hans van Steenwinckel the Younger, architect (born 1587)
- 28 August – Joachim Burser, botanist, physician and pharmacist (born 1583 in Germany)
- 1 October – Christen Friis, nobleman (born 1581)
