= 1699 in Denmark =

- Decades: 1670s; 1680s; 1690s; 1700s; 1710s
- See also: Other events of 1699; List of years in Denmark

Events from the year 1699 in Denmark.

== Incumbents ==
- Monarch – Christian V until 25 August, then Frederick IV.

== Events ==
- ;September
- 14 September – The Treaty of Dresden is concluded, preparing the Great Northern War.

October

- 19 October – The funeral of Christian V takes place at Roskilde Cathedral.

=== Date unknown ===
- The construction of Frederiksberg Palace begins.
- The Kingo's hymnal is approved by the crown for use in Denmark–Norway.
- The Treaty of Preobrazhenskoye is signed.
- Carl von Ahlefeldt replaces Christian Gyldenløve as Lord Chamberlain.
- Siege of Tranquebar.
- Thomas Schmertz replaces Andreas Andræ as Governor of Dannemarksnagore.

== Births ==
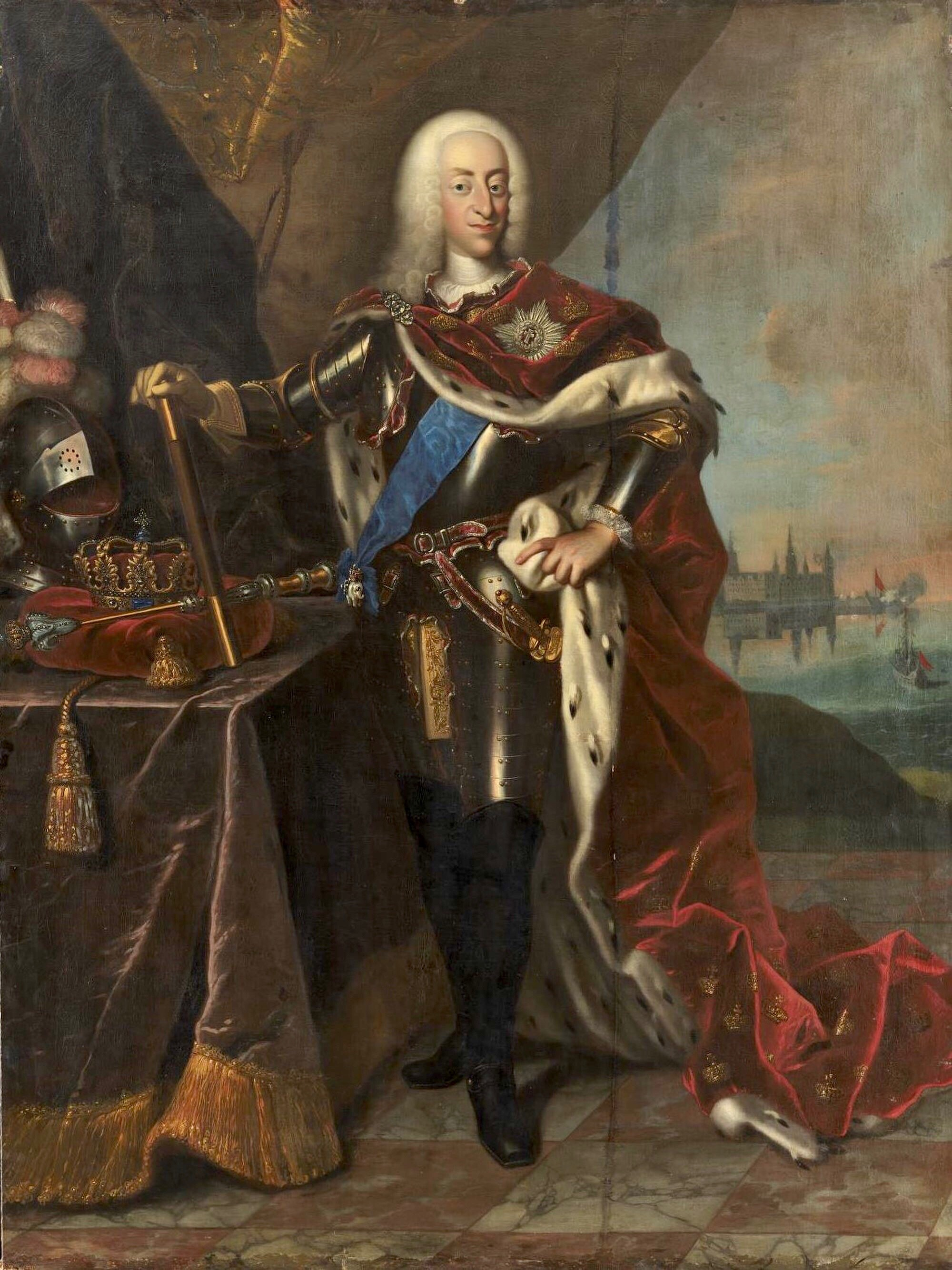
Christian VI.

- 8 March — Johan Friederich Wewer, merchant (died 1759)
- 25 March – Joachim Hartvig Johan von Barner, government official /died 1768)
- 30 November — Christian VI of Denmark, (died 1746)

== Deaths ==
- 13 January – Adam Levin Knuth, landowner, county governor and extraordinary Supreme Court justice (born 1648 in Mecklenburg)

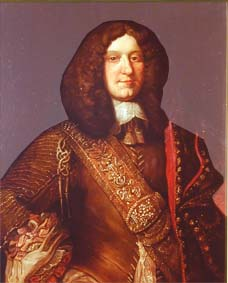
Kai Lykke.

- 12 March — Peder Griffenfeld, statesman and royal favourite (born 1635)
- 31 May – Christoffer Sehested, statesman (born 1628)
- 16 June — Constantin Marselis, nobleman (born 1647)
- 25 August – Christian V of Denmark (born 1646)
- 9 September – Kai Lykke, nobleman (born 1625)
- 29 October – Christian Jørgensen Kruse, government official born 1636)

=== Full date missing ===
- Brita Scheel, noblewoman (born 1638)
