= 1761 in Denmark =

- Decades: 1740s; 1750s; 1760s; 1770s; 1780s
- See also: Other events of 1761; List of years in Denmark

Events from the year 1761 in Denmark.

== Incumbents ==
- Monarch – Frederick V
- Prime minister – Johan Ludvig Holstein-Ledreborg

== Events ==
- 4 January – The Danish Arabia Expedition departs from Copenhagen.
- 13 January – The Fire Insurance for All Danish Market Towns is instituted by law.

=== Undated ===
- Georg Christian Oeder begins the publication of Flora Danica
- Johan Jacob Bruun begins the publication of his Novus Atlas Daniæ

== Births ==
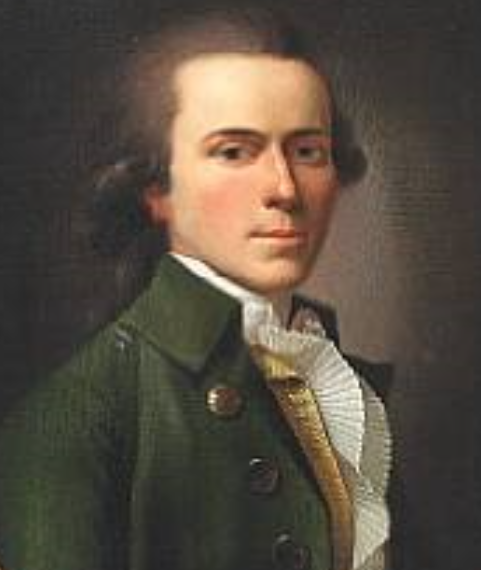
Edmund Burke.

- 22 January – Georg Nikolaus von Nissen, diplomat and music historian (died 1826)
- 27 June – Jens Bloch, theologian and bishop (died 1830)
- 15 October – Peter Grønland, composer (died 1825)
- 2 November – Edmund Burke, diplomat (died 1821 in France)
- 20 November – Carl Conrad Gustav Knuth, landowner (died 1815)

=== Full date missing ===
- Edmund Bourke, diplomat (died 1821)
- Lars Lassen, landowner (died 1823)
- Marie Cathrine Preisler, stage actress (died 1797)

== Deaths ==
- February 17 — Simon Carl Stanley, sculptor (born 1703)
- July 16 - Jacob Fortling, sculptor, architect and industrialist (born 1711)
- Princess Dorothea of Schleswig-Holstein-Sonderburg-Beck
- 7 December – Olfert Fas Fischer, naval offborn (died 1700)
