= 1628 in Denmark =

- Decades: 1600s; 1610s; 1620s; 1630s; 1640s
- See also: Other events of 1628; List of years in Denmark

Events from the year 1628 in Denmark.

== Incumbents ==
- Monarch - Christian IV

== Events ==
- 22 August – Danish forces were defeated in the Battle of Wolgast

== Births ==
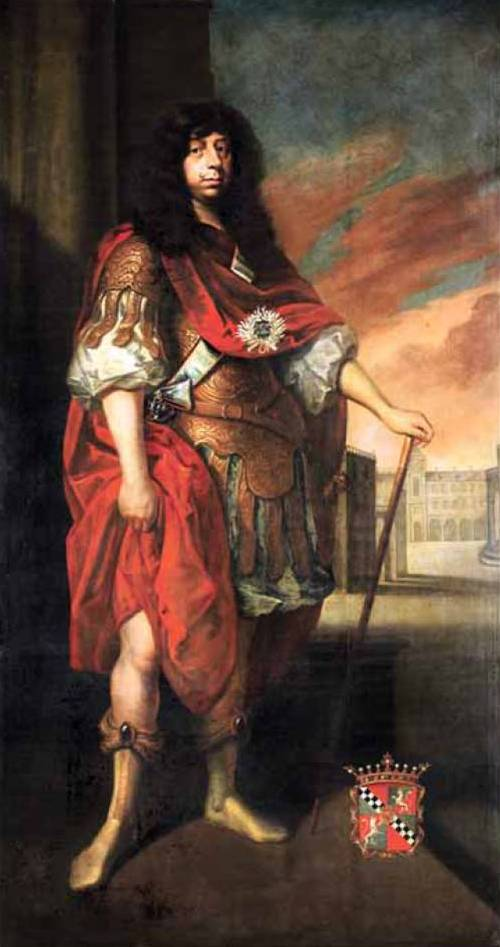
Ludvig Rosenkrantz

- 18 April – Ludvig Rosenkrantz, nobleman and civil servant, the first baron in Norway (died 1685).

=== Full date missing ===
- Christoffer Sehested, statesman (died 1699)

== Deaths ==
- 28 June – Jens Munk, navigator and explorer (born 1579)
