= 1704 in Denmark =

- Decades: 1680s; 1690s; 1700s; 1710s; 1720s
- See also: Other events of 1704; List of years in Denmark

Events from the year 1704 in Denmark.

== Incumbents ==
- Monarch – Frederick IV
- Grand Chancellor – Conrad von Reventlow

== Events ==
=== Undated ===
- Ole Rømer opens his Observatorium Tusculanum in Vridsløselille.
- Vitus Bering enrolls with the Imperial Russian Navy.
- The new Kommercekollegiet is set up,

== Births ==
- 4 April – Andreas Brünniche, painter (died 1769)

== Deaths ==
- 17 March – Willum Worm, judge and royal historiographer (died 1633)
- 17 April – Ulrik Frederik Gyldenløve, statesman and military officer (born 1638)
- 17 June – Georg Franck von Franckenau, physician and botanist (born 1643 in Germany)
- 27 June – Elisabeth Helene von Vieregg, noble and lady-in-waiting (born 1679 in Germany)
- 30 October – Princess Frederica Amalia of Denmark, princess (born 1649)
