= 1635 in Denmark =

- Decades: 1610s; 1620s; 1630s; 1640s; 1650s
- See also: Other events of 1635; List of years in Denmark

Events from the year 1635 in Denmark.

== Incumbents ==
- Monarch – Christian IV

== Births ==
- 24 August – Peder Griffenfeld, statesman and royal favourite (died 1699)
