= 1634 in Denmark =

- Decades: 1610s; 1620s; 1630s; 1640s; 1650s
- See also: Other events of 1634; List of years in Denmark

Events from the year 1634 in Denmark.

== Incumbents ==
- Monarch – Christian IV

== Events ==
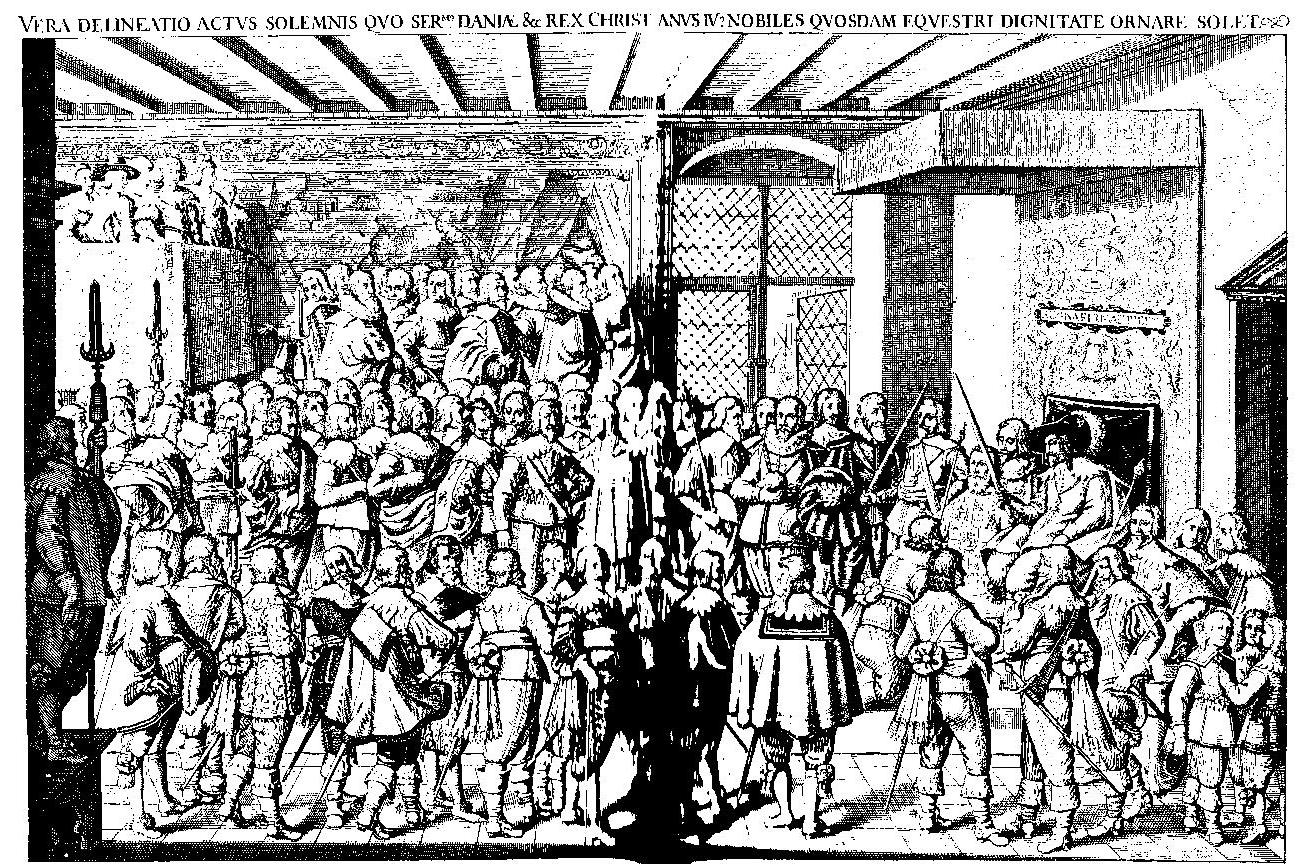
5 October: The grand wedding of Christian, Prince-Elect of Denmark and Magdalene Sibylle of Saxony

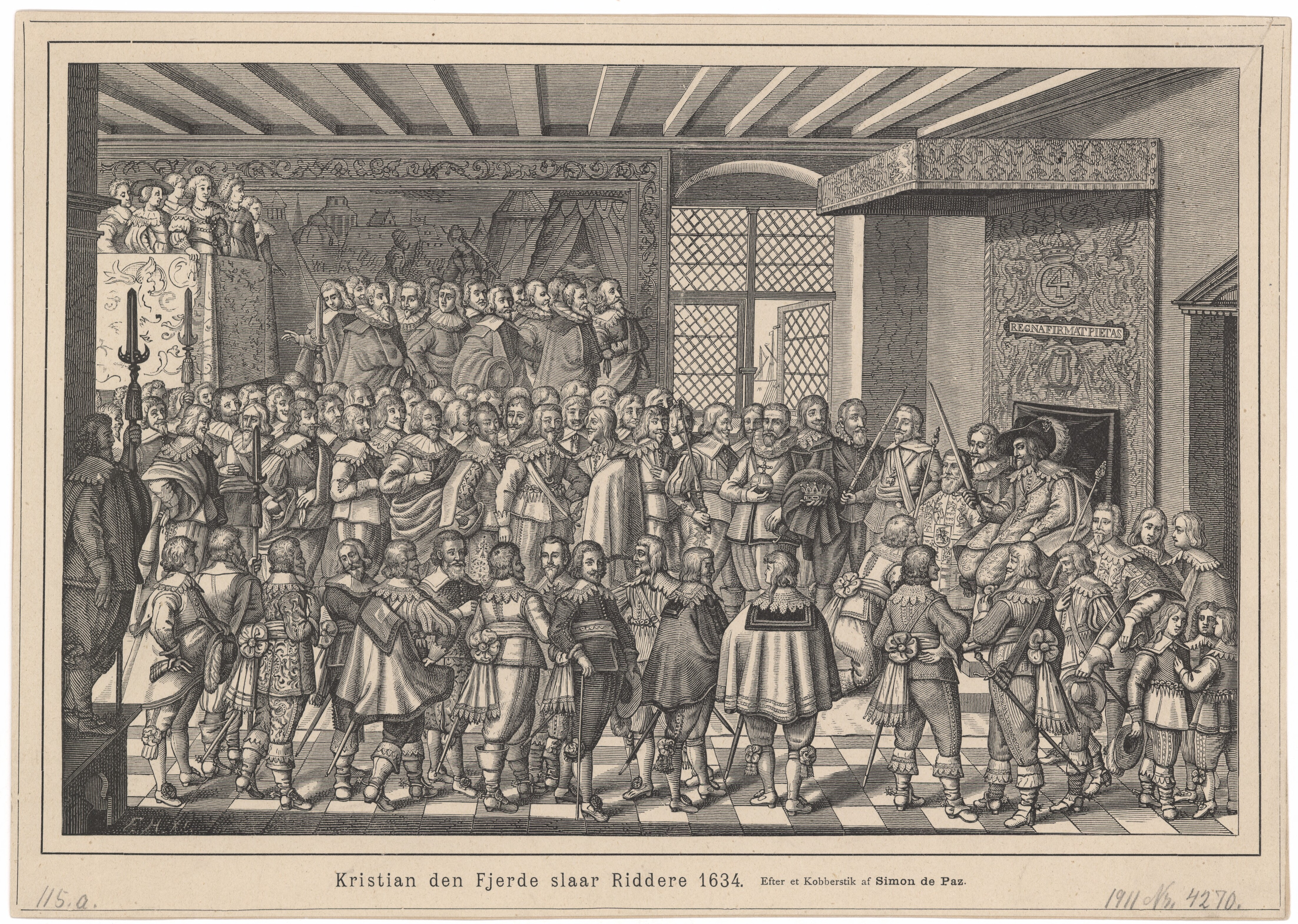
Christian IV at a knighting ceremony in 1634.

- 5 October – The grand wedding of Christian, Prince-Elect of Denmark and Magdalene Sibylle of Saxony is celebrated in Copenhagen.
- 22 December – The Copenhagen Skipper's Guild was founded.

== Culture ==
=== Art ===
- Jørgen Ringnis completes an elaborately carved new pulpit for Stubbekøbing Church.
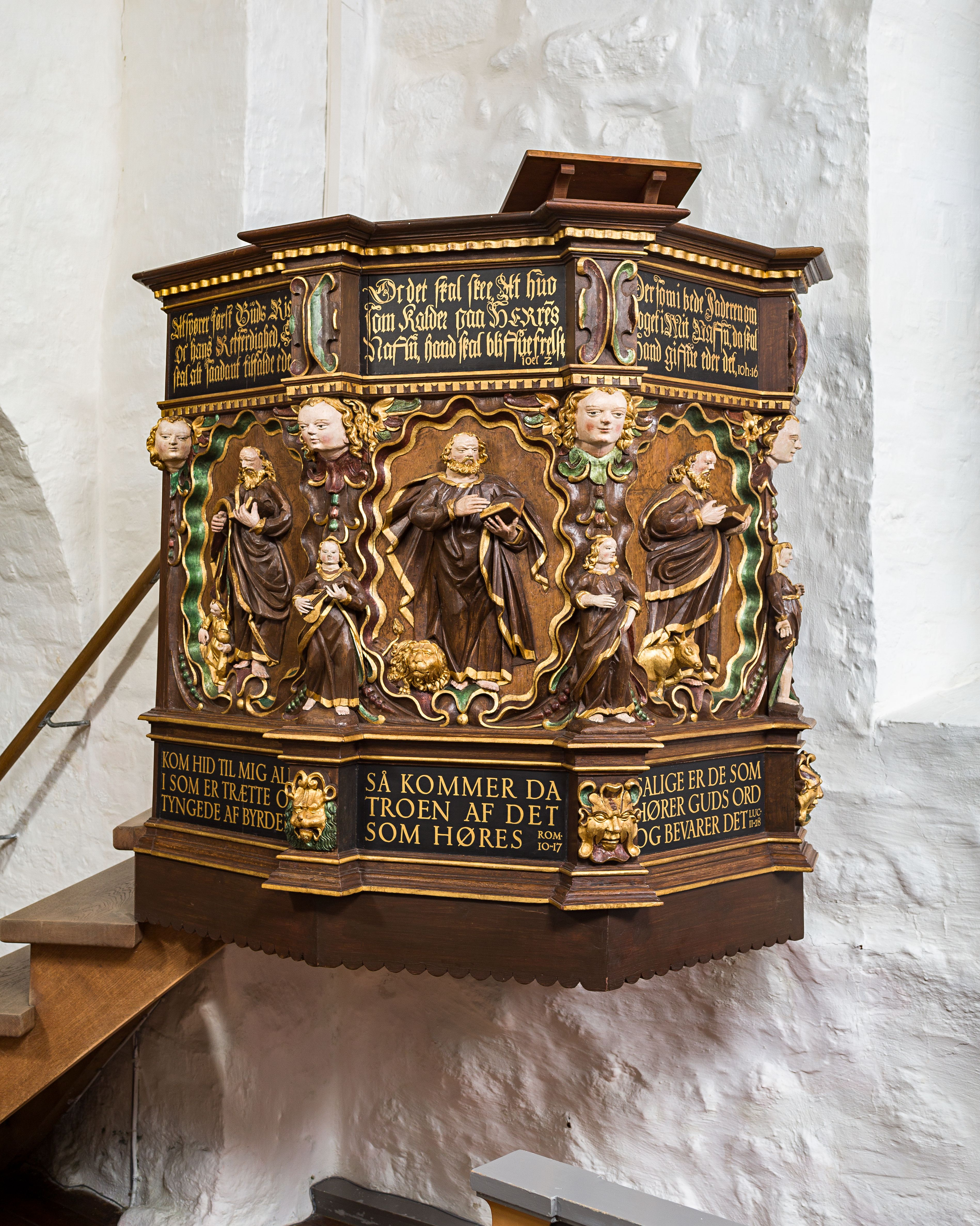
Hans Nielsen Bang's pulpit in Skeby Church.

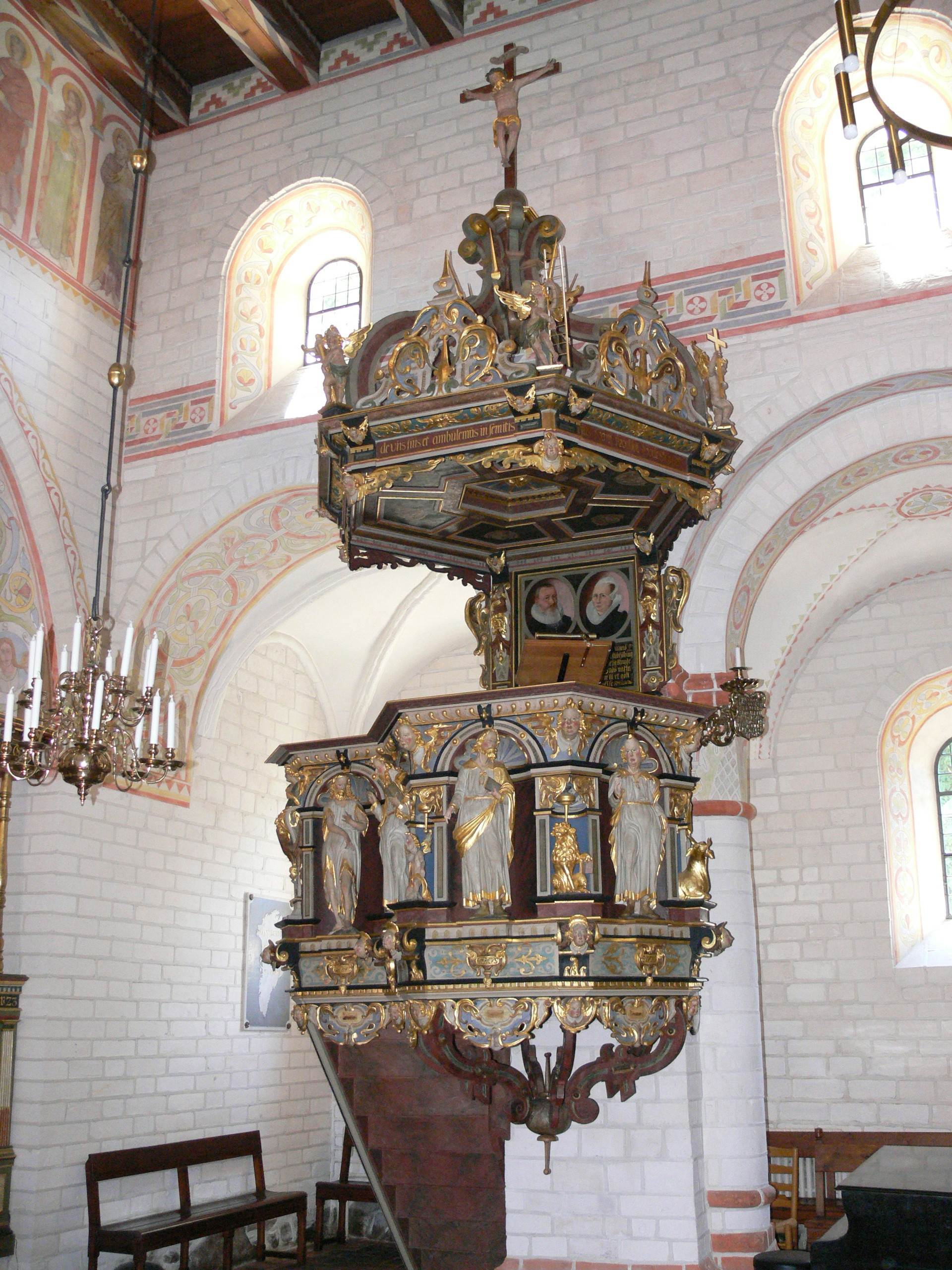
Jørgen Ringnis' pulpit in Stubbekøbing Church.

== Births ==
- 15 December – Thomas Kingo, bishop, poet and hymn-writer (died 1703).

== Deaths ==
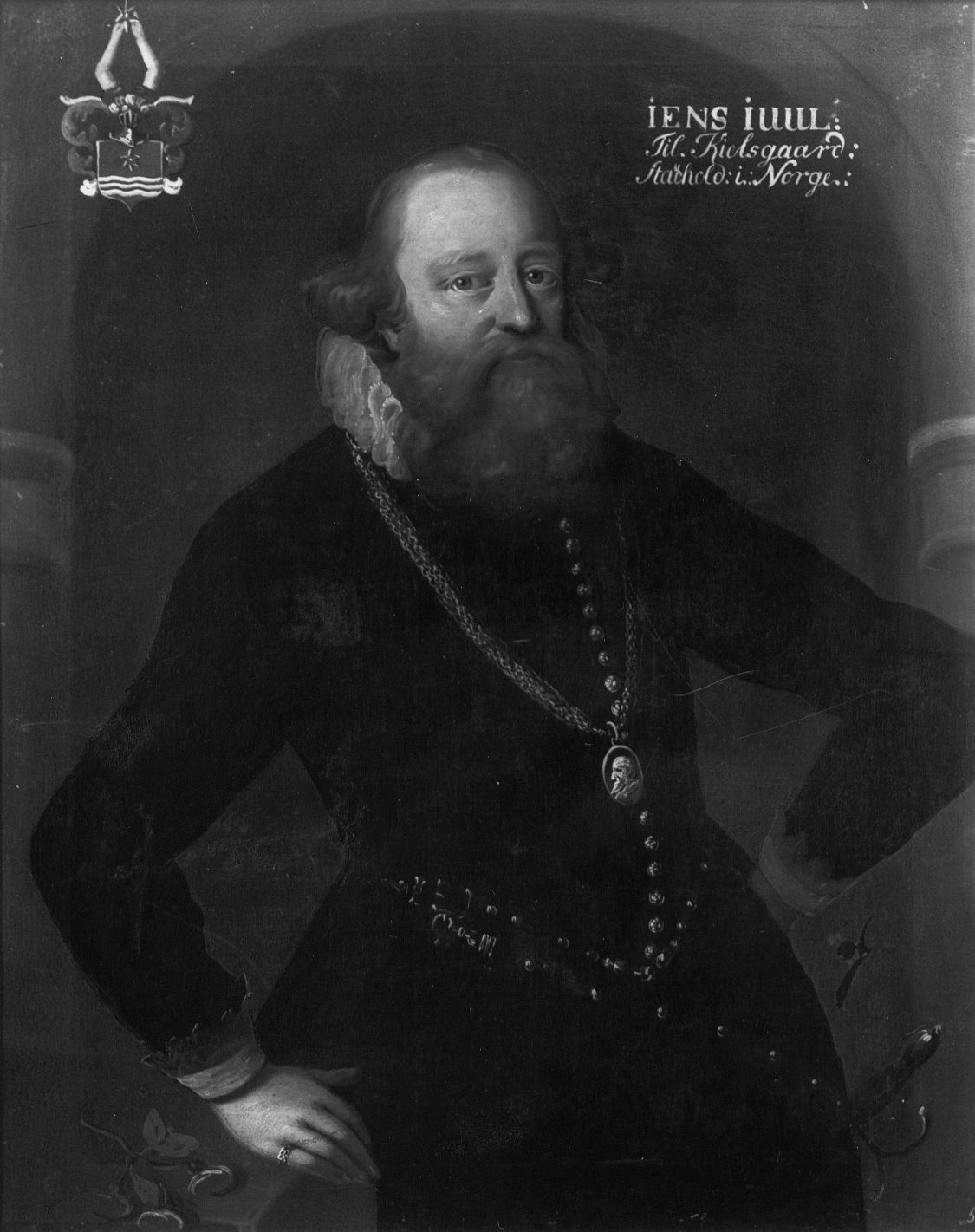
Jens Hermansson Juel.

- 26 March – Jens Hermansson Juel, Danish nobleman who served as Governor-general of Norway (born 1580).
