= 1631 in Denmark =

- Decades: 1610s; 1620s; 1630s; 1640s; 1650s
- See also: Other events of 1631; List of years in Denmark

Events from the year 1631 in Denmark.

== Incumbents ==
- Monarch – Christian IV

== Events ==
- 2 June – Frederik III gave 20 Danish-Dutch peasants the rights to settle at Allégade, founding the settlement of "Ny Amager" (New Amager) or "Ny Hollænderby" (New Dutchman-town) in what would later become known as Frederiksberg.

=== Undated ===
- Construction of Nyboder begins.

== Births ==
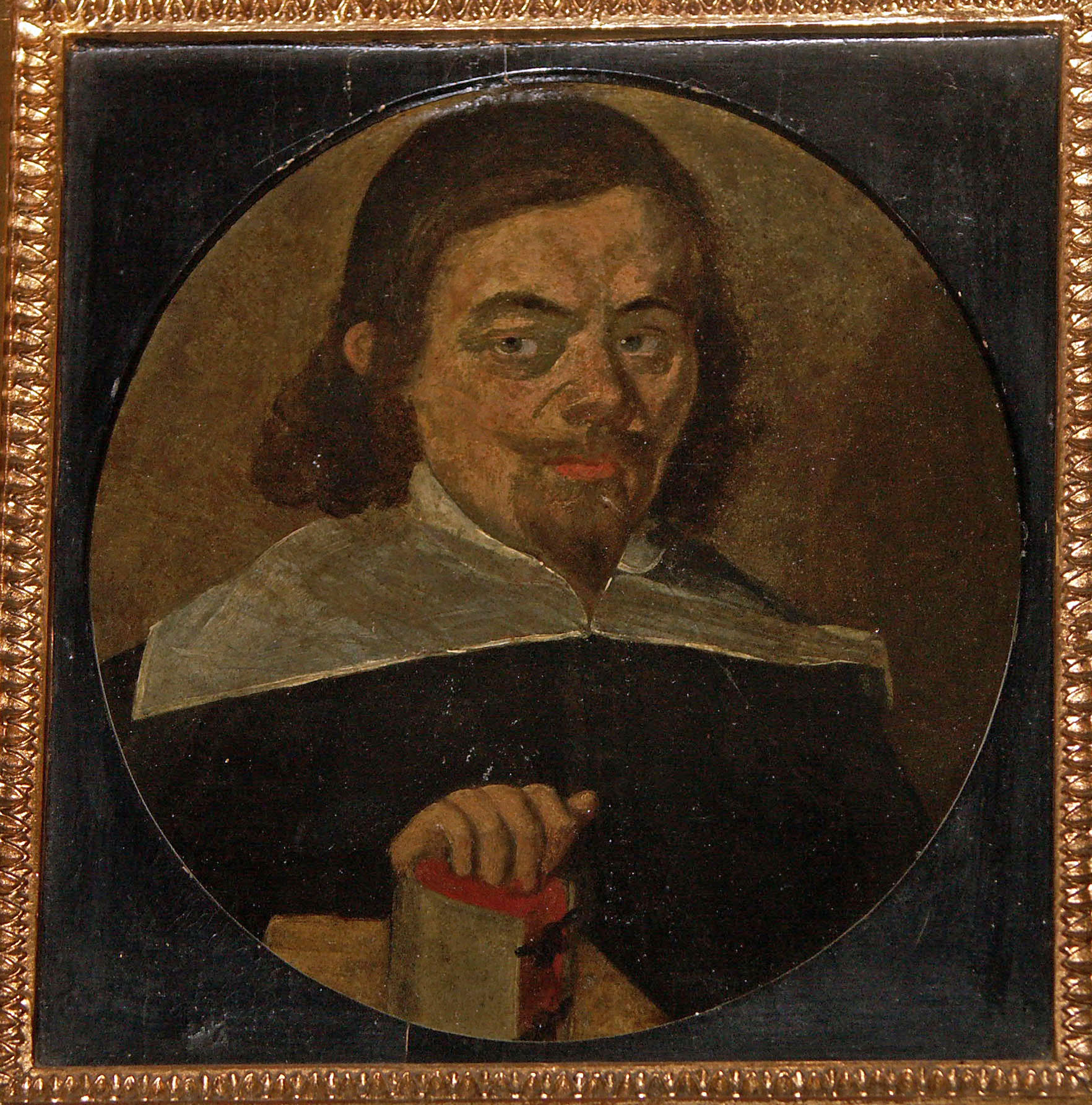
Peder Syv

- 22 February – Peder Syv, philologist, folklorist and priest, known for his collections of Danish proverbs and folksongs (died 1702).
- 15 July – Jens Juel, diplomat and statesman (died 1700)

== Deaths ==
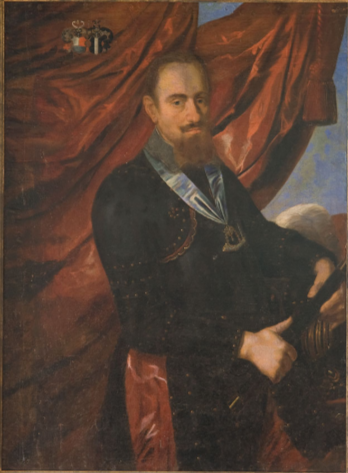
Jørgen Skeel.

- 19 June – Jørgen Skeel, rifsmarsk (born 1578)
- 14 October – Sophie of Mecklenburg-Güstrow, Queen of Denmark and Norway, and mother of King Christian IV (born 1557 in Wismar)
