= 1630 in Denmark =

- Decades: 1610s; 1620s; 1630s; 1640s; 1650s
- See also: Other events of 1630; List of years in Denmark

Events from the year 1630 in Denmark.

== Incumbents ==
- Monarch – Christian IV

== Events ==
=== Undated ===
- A new building for Vartov Hospital is constructed at present-day Trianglen outside Copenhagen's Eastern City Gate.

== Culture ==
=== Art ===
- Jørgen Ringnis completes an elaborately carved new pulpit for Nakskov Church.
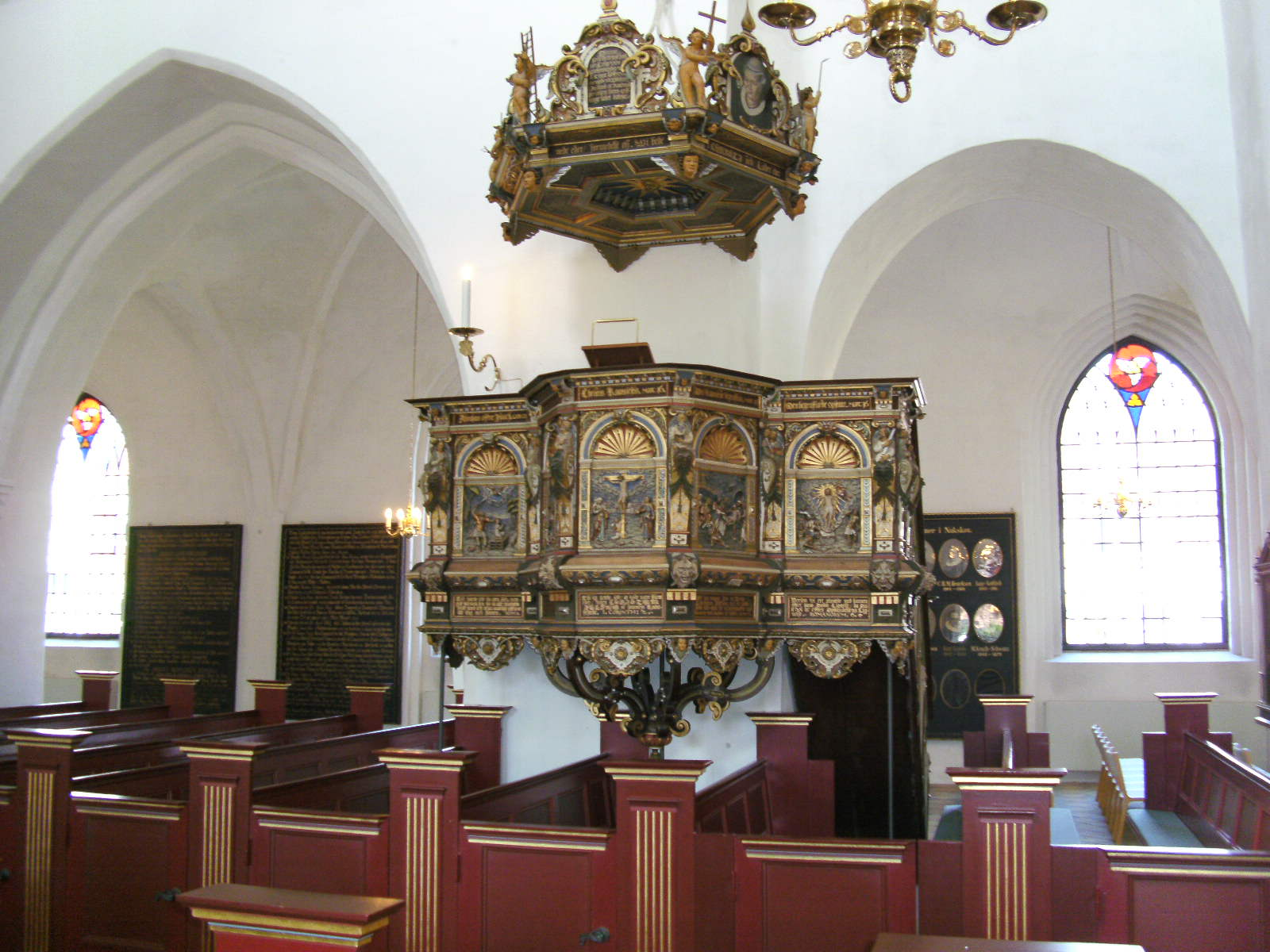
Jørgen Ringnis pulpit in Nakskov Church.

== Births ==
- 7 April – Ulrik Christian Gyldenløve, commander-in-chief of the Danish army (died 1658)
- 16 April – Lambert van Haven, architect (died 1695)

=== Full date missing ===
- Jørgen Hansen Burchart, governor of Norway (died c. 1700)
- Caius Gabriel Cibber, sculptor (died 1700)

== Deaths ==
- 25 June – Jacob Ulfeldt, politician (born 1567)
