= 1702 in Denmark =

- Decades: 1680s; 1690s; 1700s; 1710s; 1720s
- See also: Other events of 1702; List of years in Denmark

Events from the year 1702 in Denmark.

== Incumbents ==
- Monarch – Frederick IV
- Grand Chancellor – Conrad von Reventlow

== Events ==
- 21 February – Vornedskab is abolished on Zealand and Lolland-Falster (already abolished on Møn in 1696).
- 18 July – Charles Frederick, Duke of Holstein-Gottorp succeeds his father as Duke of Schleswig.

=== Undated ===
- Moltke Mansion established
- Vornedskab abolished

== Births ==
- 4 February – Friedrich Carl von Gram, lord chamberlain and county governor (died 1782)
- 10 May – Abraham Lehn, landowner (died 1757)
- 1 August – Christian Danneskiold-Samsøe, Danish nobleman (died 1728)
- 12 September – Bernhard Møllmann, historian, writer, librarian and professor (died 1778)

== Deaths ==
- 5 January – Peder Luxdorph, judge and landowner (born 1648)
- 17 February – Peder Syv, philologist, folklorist and priest (born 1631)
- 24 April – Frederik Vind, landowner and diocesan governor (born 1662)
