= 1629 in Denmark =

- Decades: 1600s; 1610s; 1620s; 1630s; 1640s
- See also: Other events of 1629; List of years in Denmark

Events from the year 1629 in Denmark.

== Incumbents ==
- Monarch – Christian IV

== Events ==
- 22 May – Christian IV signs the Treaty of Lübeck, bringing an end to Denmark-Norway's intervention in the Thirty Years' War.
- 25 July – The County of Christiansborg (from 1741: The County of Christianssæde) is established by Christian Detlev Reventlow from the manors f Christianssæde, Ålstrup, Skelstofte and Pederstrup as well as the farm (parcelgård) Frihedsminde.

=== Undated ===
- A fire destroys much of Kronborg Castle but it is subsequently rebuilt.
- Bech's Windmill is constructed in Svaneke on Bornholm.

== Births ==
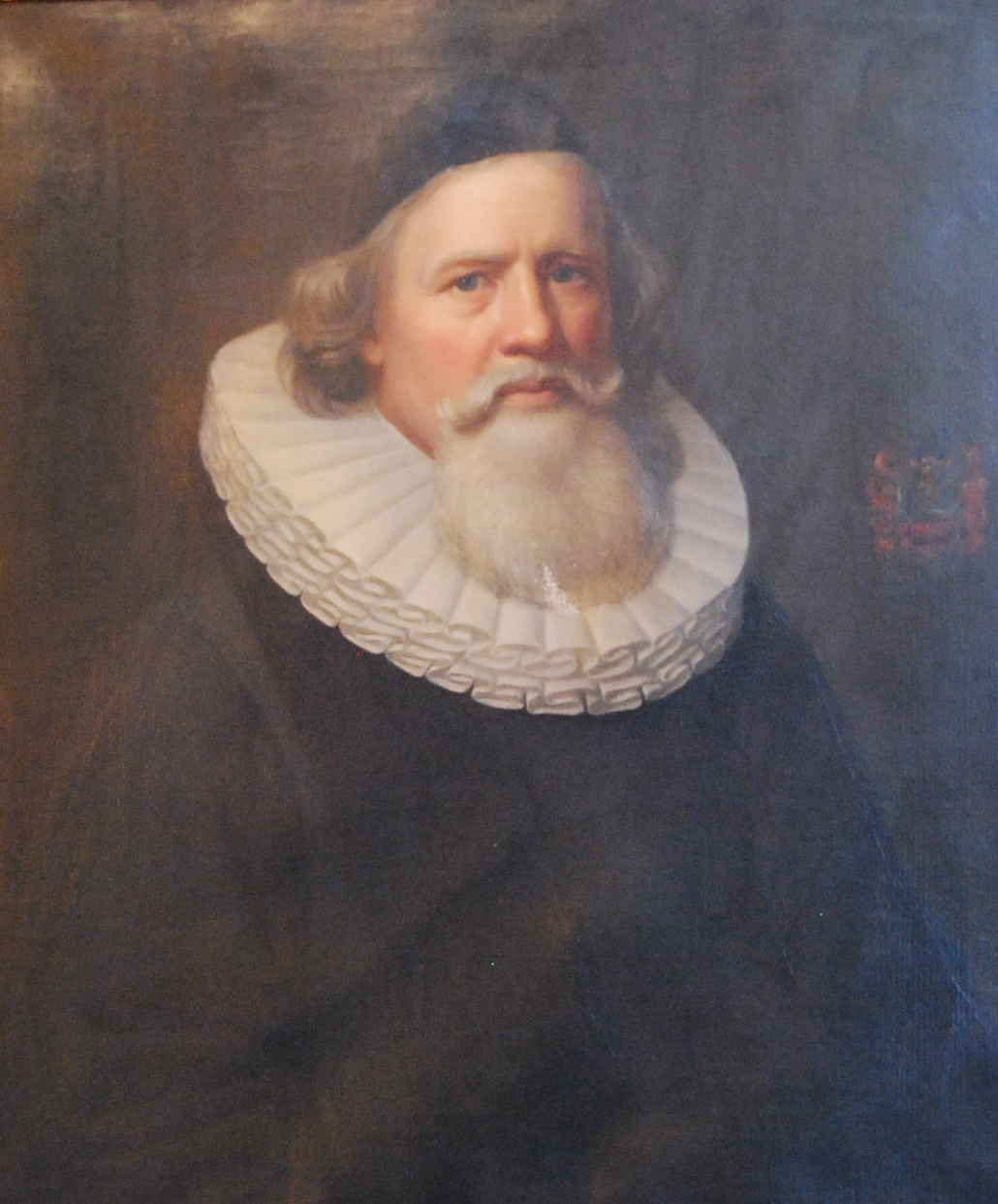
Henrik Gerner.

- 1 September – Dorothea Elisabeth Christiansdatter, daughter of Christian IV and catholic nun (died 1687 in Germany)
- 9 December – Henrik Gerner, clergy (died 1700)

=== Full date missing ===
- Jens Foss, physician (died 1687)

== Deaths ==
- 13 July – Caspar Bartholin the Elder, scientist (born 1585)

=== Full date missing ===
- Kirsten Madsdatter, royal mistress
