= 1703 in Denmark =

- Decades: 1680s; 1690s; 1700s; 1710s; 1720s
- See also: Other events of 1703; List of years in Denmark

Events from the year 1703 in Denmark.

== Incumbents ==
- Monarch — Frederick IV
- Grand Chancellor — Conrad von Reventlow

== Events ==
April

- 14 April – HDMS Elephanten is launched at the Royal Danish Dockyard in Copenhagen.

September

- 6 September Frederick VI is secretly married to Elisabeth Helene von Vieregg and thereby becomes guilty of bigamy.

=== Undated ===
- Frederick IV opens a new opera house in Copenhagen.

== Births ==
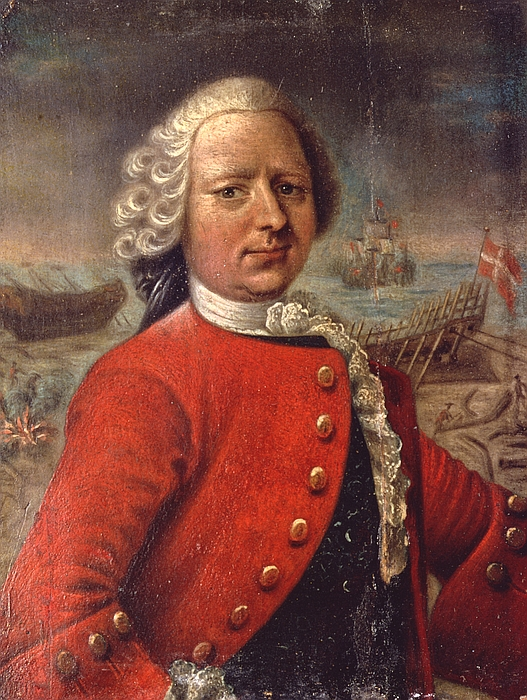
Andreas Bjørn.

- 1 September – Just Fabritius, businessman (died 1766)
- 29 September — Baltzer Fleischer, civil servant (died 1767)
- 1 October – Frederik Danneskiold-Samsøe, admiral, government minister and landowner (died 1770)
- 13 October — Otto Thott, Count, minister of state and bibliophile (died 1785)
- 28 October – Andreas Bjørn, businessman, shipbuilder and ship-owner (died 1750)
- 12 December — Simon Carl Stanley, sculptor (died 1761)
- 24 December – Christen Lindencrone, merchant and landowner (died 1772)

== Deaths ==
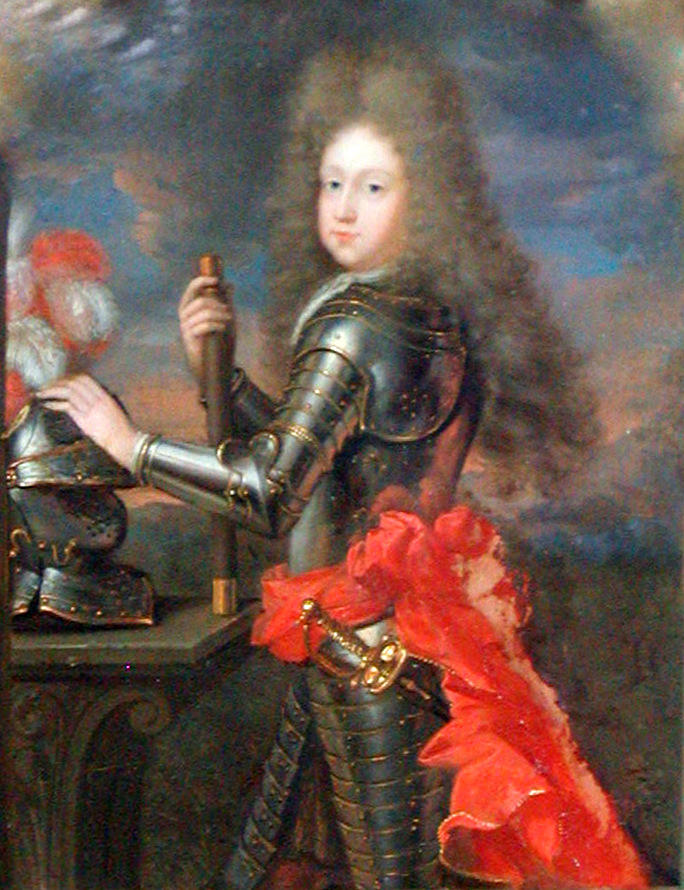
Christian Gyldenløve.

- 16 July — Christian Gyldenløve, Christian V's son (born 1674)
- 14 October — Thomas Kingo, bishop, poet and hymn-writer (born 1634)
