= 1759 in Denmark =

- Decades: 1730s; 1740s; 1750s; 1760s; 1770s
- See also: Other events of 1759; List of years in Denmark

Events from the year 1759 in Denmark.

== Incumbents ==
- Monarch – Frederick V
- Prime minister – Johan Ludvig Holstein-Ledreborg

== Events ==
Undated

- Construction of Christian's Church, Copenhagen is completed.
- The settlement of Aasiaat is founded as Egedesminde in Greenland.
- The village of Havredal is founded.

== Births ==
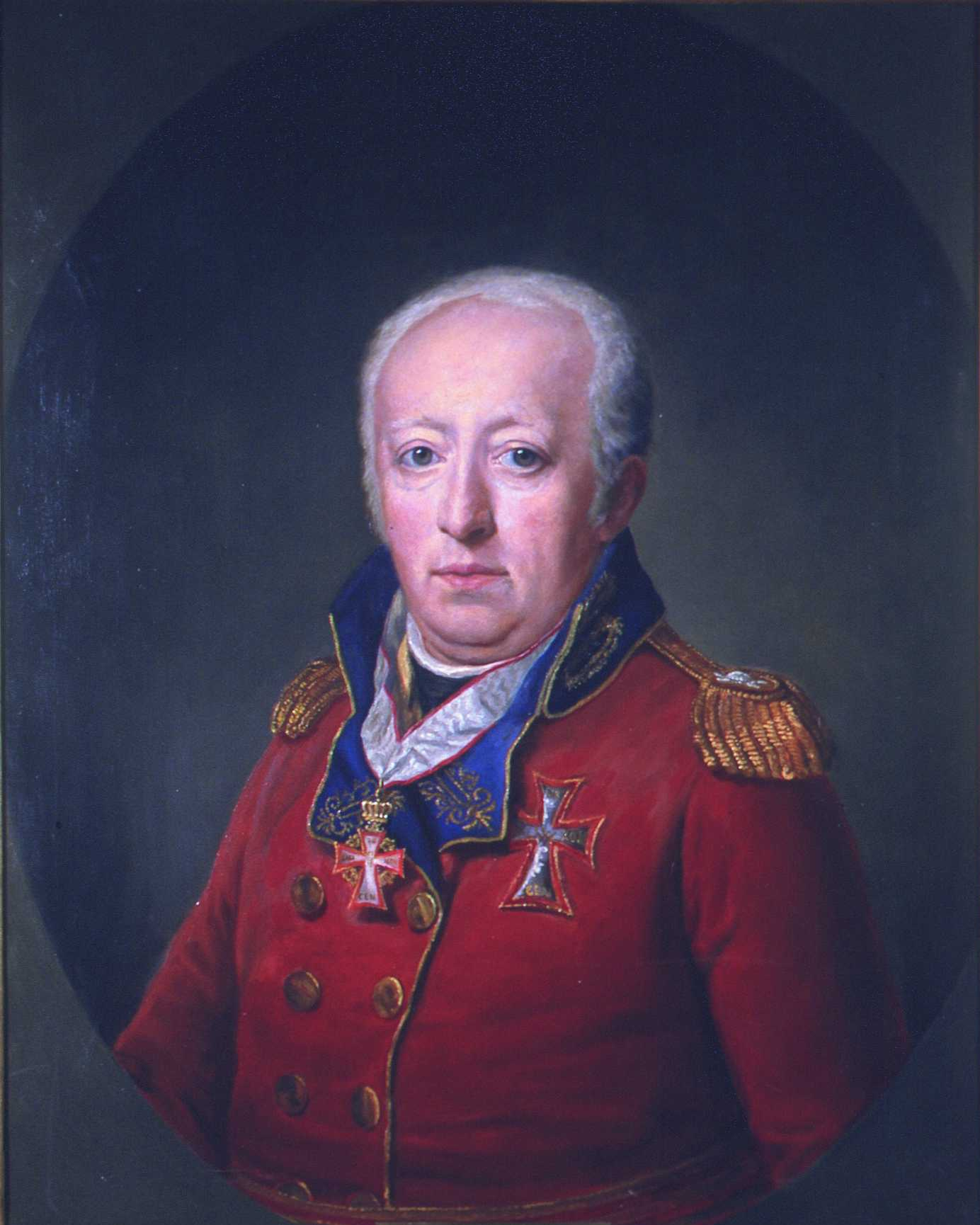
Frederik Gottschalk von Haxthausen.

- 15 January – Jørgen Mandix, judge (died 1835)
- 12 March – Rasmus Nyerup, literary historian, philologist, folklorist and librarian (died 1829)
- 5 April – Erik Viborg, veterinarian and botanist (died 1822)
- 14 July – Frederik Gottschalk von Haxthausen, Danish military officer and Norway's first minister of finance (died 1825)
- 19 July – Christopher Friedenreich Hage, merchant (died 1849)
- 11 December – Johan David Vogel, businessman and brewer (died 1728)

== Deaths ==
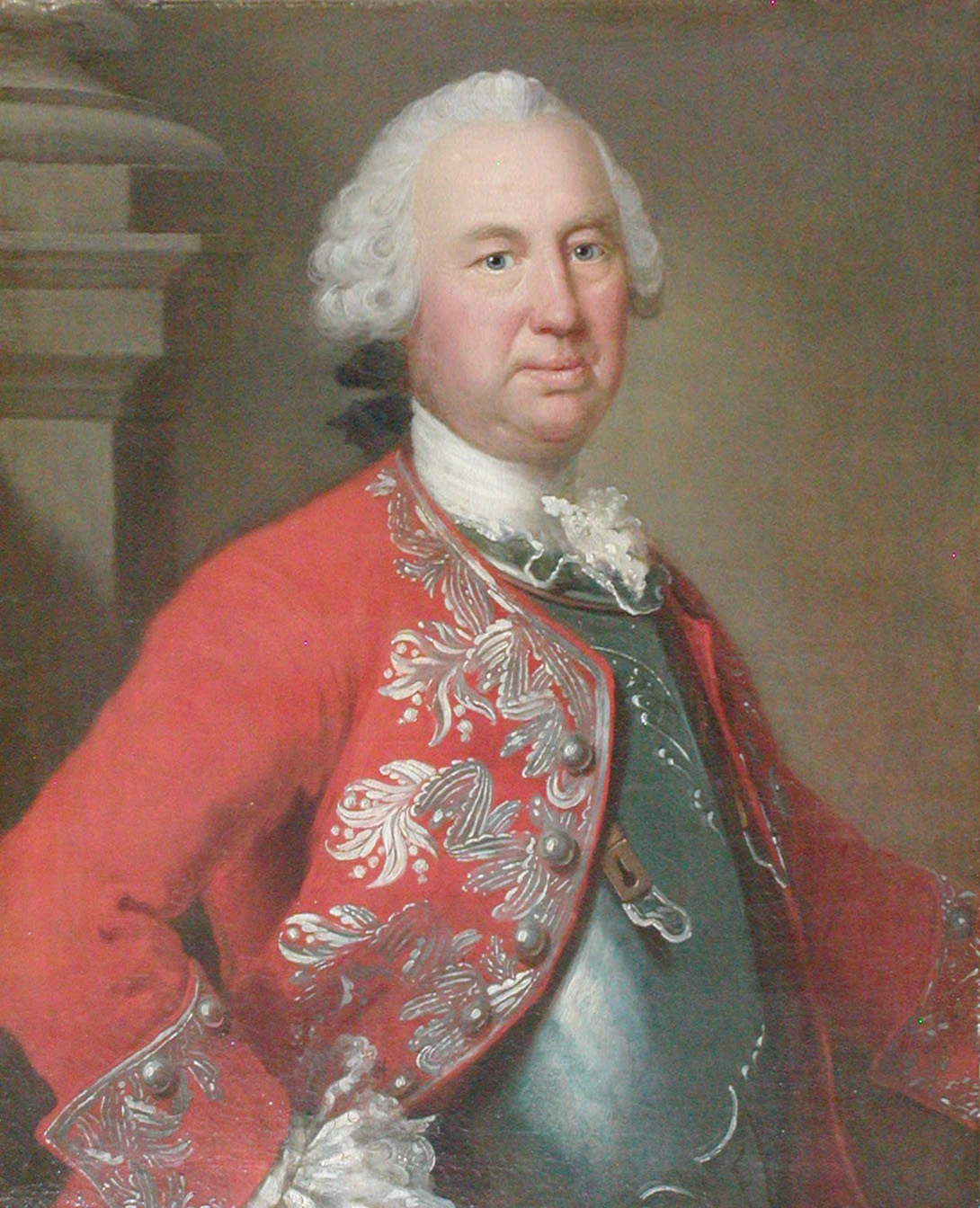
Lauritz de Thurah.

- 4 April – Christoffer Foltmar, painter and organist (born 1718)
- 9 May – Johan Friederich Wewer, merchant (born 1699)
- 5 September – Lauritz de Thurah, architect (born 1706)
- 10 September – Frederik Kaas, naval officer (born 1730)
- 6 October – Johann Gottfried Burman Becker, pharmacist, writer and illustrator (died 1860)
- 29 October – Anne Dorthe Lund, actress (date of birth unknown)
