= 1705 in Denmark =

- Decades: 1680s; 1690s; 1700s; 1710s; 1720s
- See also: Other events of 1705; List of years in Denmark

Events from the year 1705 in Denmark.

== Incumbents ==
- Monarch – Frederick IV
- Grand Chancellor – Conrad von Reventlow

== Events ==
=== Undated ===
- The present Farumgård main building is constructed.
- Staldmestergården on Slotsholmen in Copenhagen is constructed.

== Births ==
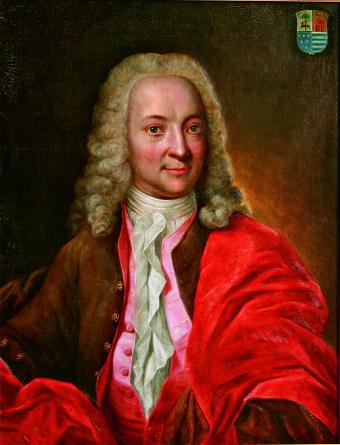
Johan Lorentz Castenschiold.

- 8 March – Margrethe Marie Thomasine Numsen, courtier (died 1776)
- 5 April – Bertha von Holstein, noblewoman
- May – Ambrosius Stub, poet (died 1758)
- 13 May – Johan Lorentz Castenschiold, merchant and landowner (died 1745)
- 27 November – Volrad August von der Lühe, government official (died 1778)

== Deaths ==
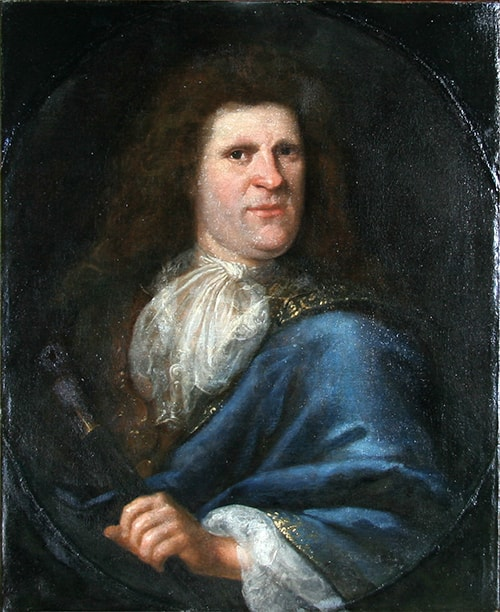
Claus Rasch.

- 8 January – Claus Rasch, chief of police (born 1639)
- 23 November – Prince William of Denmark, prince of Denmark (born 1687)
