= 1625 in Denmark =

- Decades: 1600s; 1610s; 1620s; 1630s; 1640s
- See also: Other events of 1625; List of years in Denmark

Events from the year 1625 in Denmark.

== Incumbents ==
- Monarch – Christian IV

== Events ==
- 25 January – The Danish West India Company is granted an eight-year monopoly on trade with the West Indies, Virginia, Brazil and Guinea.
- 9 December – The Treaty of The Hague leads to Denmark-Norway's intervention in the Thirty Years' War.

== Births ==
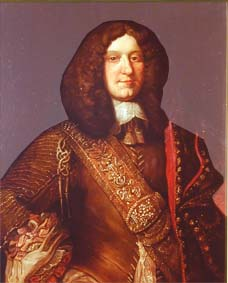
Kai Lykke.

- 16 March – Kai Lykke, courtier (died 1699)
- 15 April – Hans Rostgaard, bailiff, resistance fighter and landowner (died 1684)
- 15 June – Frederik Giese, civil servant, county governor and landowner (died 1693)
- 17 June – Peder Hansen Resen, historian and legal scholar (died 1688)
- 13 August – Rasmus Bartholin, physician and grammarian (died 1698)
- 31 October
  - Markor Rodsteen, naval officer (died 1681)
  - Christen Jensen Lodberg, bishop (died 1693)

=== Full date missing ===
- Heinrich Jansen, painter (died 1667)

== Deaths ==
- 8 July – Elizabeth of Denmark, Duchess of Brunswick-Wolfenbüttel, princess (born 1573)
- 14 September — Pieter Isaacsz, painter (born c. 1569)

=== Full date missing ===
- Truid Aagesenm composer (born 1593)
