= 1633 in Denmark =

- Decades: 1610s; 1620s; 1630s; 1640s; 1650s
- See also: Other events of 1633; List of years in Denmark

Events from the year 1633 in Denmark.

== Incumbents ==
- Monarch – Christian IV

== Births ==
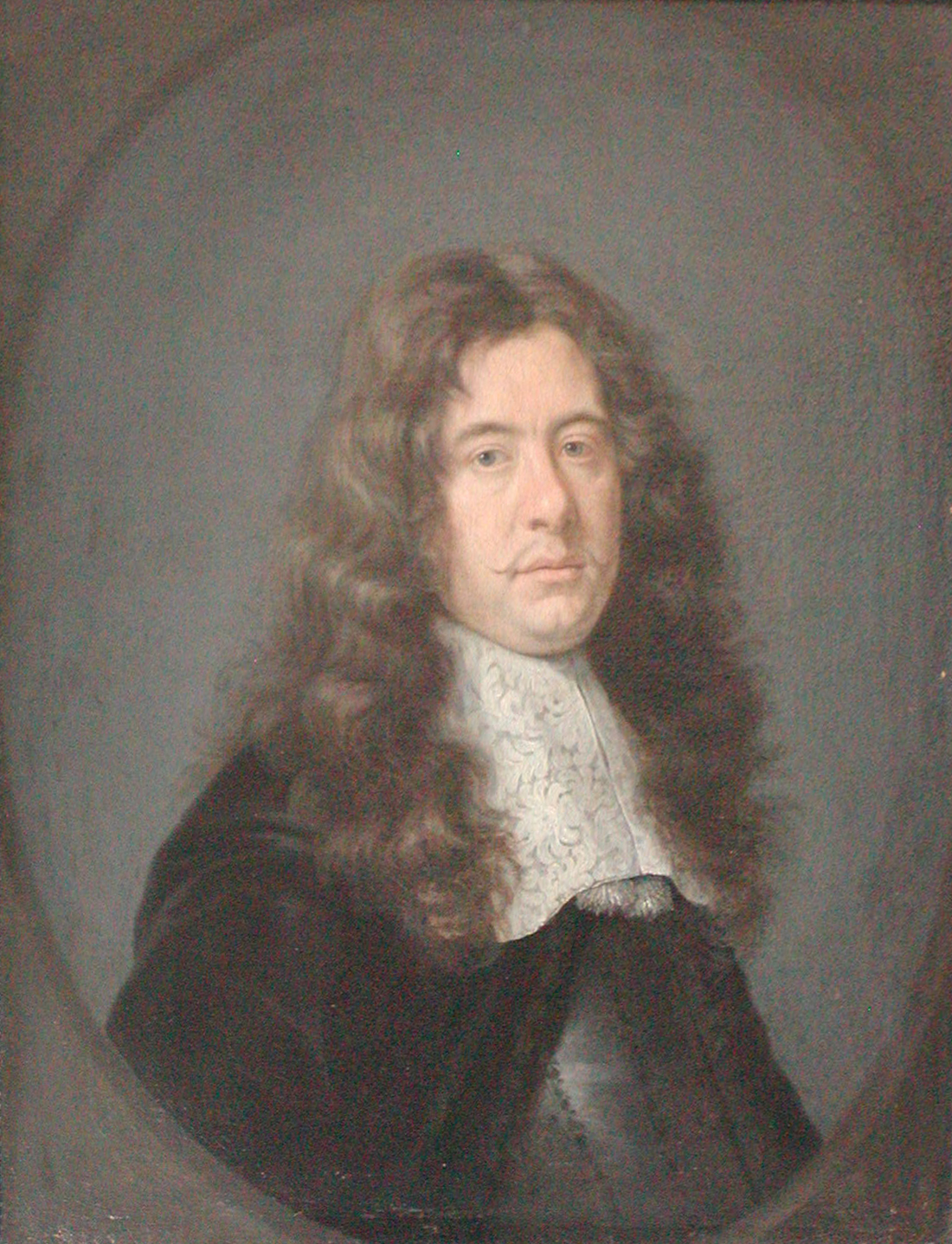
Willum Worm.

- 11 September – Willum Worm, judge and royal historiographer (died 1704)

=== Full date missing ===
- Jacob Jensen Jersin, theologian (died 1694)

== Deaths ==
- 14 June – Christian, Duke of Schleswig-Holstein-Sonderburg-Ærø, first and only Duke of Ærø (born 1570)
- 12 August – Ulrik of Denmark, prince (born 1611)
