= 1706 in Denmark =

- Decades: 1680s; 1690s; 1700s; 1710s; 1720s
- See also: Other events of 1706; List of years in Denmark

Events from the year 1706 in Denmark.

== Incumbents ==
- Monarch – Frederick IV
- Grand Chancellor – Conrad von Reventlow

== Events ==
- 16 January – Stege Pharmacy is established in the town of Stege on Møn.
- 24 May – Garrisnon Church is inaugurated in Copenhagen.

=== Undated ===
- The Tranquebar Mission is established.
- The country house Nlågård outside Copenhagen's northern city gate is constructed by Prince Charles of Denmark.

== Publications ==
- Thormodus Torfæus: Gronlandia antiquæ, Copenhagen 1706 (new edi. w/notes 1947)

== Births ==
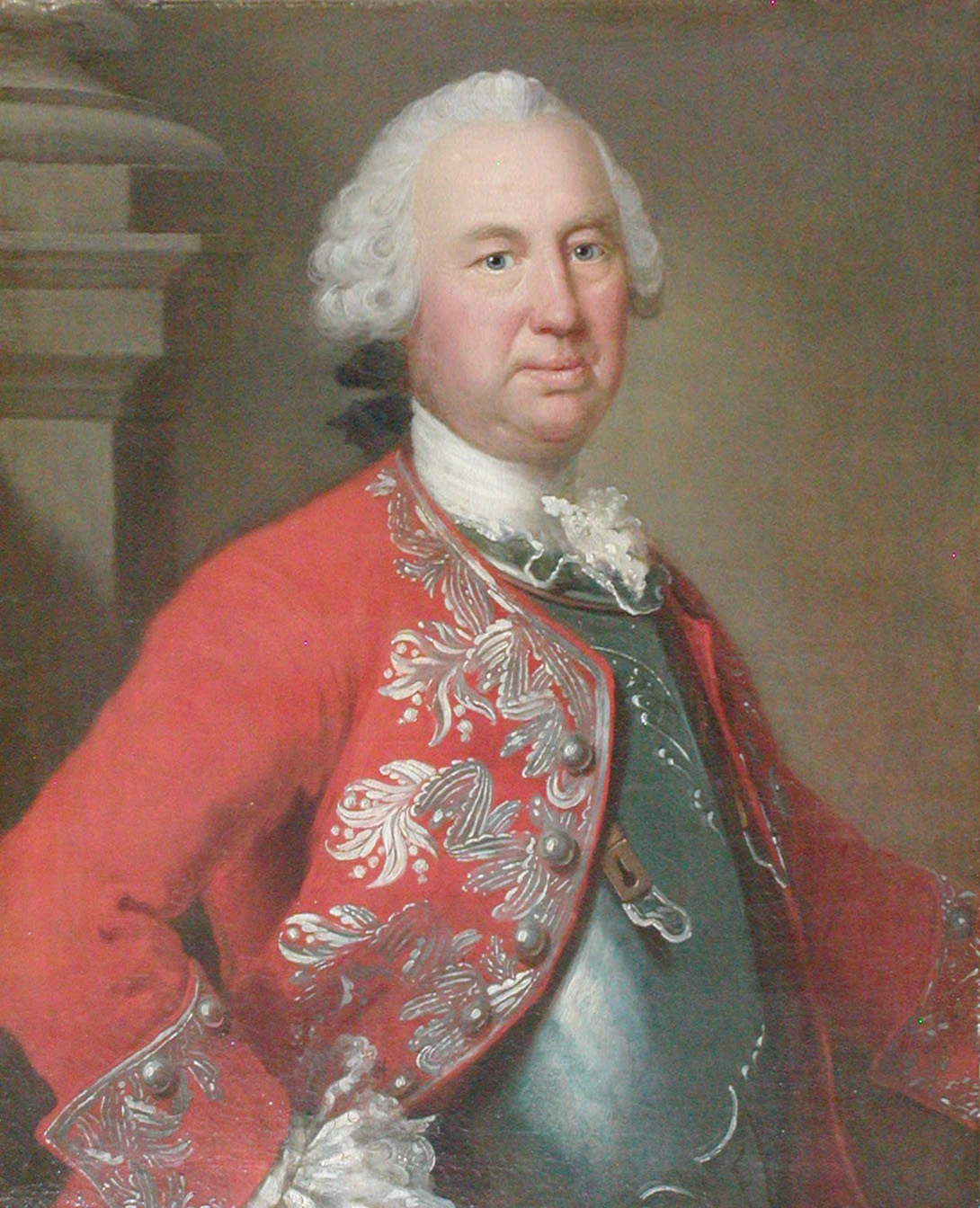
Lauritz de Thurah.

- 4 March – Lauritz de Thurah, architect (died 1759)
- 18 June – Herman Lengerken Kløcker, merchant, landowner, Supreme Court justice and vice mayor of Copenhagen (died 1765)
- 22 June – Carl Juel, statesman, councillor, and diocesan governor (died 1767)
- 6 October – Princess Charlotte Amalie, princess of Denmark (died 1782)

== Deaths ==
- 6 February – Claus Hansen, Governor of the Danish West Indies
- 22/23 April – Princess Wilhelmine Ernestine of Denmark, princess (born 1650)
