= Rosborg witch trials =

The Rosborg witch trials took place at Rosborg manor on Jylland in Denmark between 1639 and 1642, becoming one of the most notable witch trials in Denmark. It was the first large-scale witch trial in Denmark since the widespread Danish witch hunt of 1619-1632.

Niels Munk, the landowner and nobleman, who owned Rosborg Manor, accused twelve people of bewitching his ailing children, and causing their illnesses through witchcraft. As the landlord, Monk had feudal rights to arrest, interrogate and judge people on his estate, making his trial an example of how a single private individual could almost entirely conduct a witch trial. The trial resulted in the prosecution of twelve people, one suicide during imprisonment, and the execution of three people by burning at the stake.
