= 1430s in Denmark =

Events from the 1430s in Denmark.

== Incumbents ==
- Monarch – Eric of Pomerania (until 1439)

== Events ==
1435

- July – The Dano-Hanseatic War (1426–1435) ends when a peace treaty with the Hanseatic League is concluded in Vordingborg.
- Undated – The Priory of Our Lady in Helsingør is established for a group of Carmelite friars from Landskrona.
- Undated – Mariager Abbey is established on a hill overlooking the ferry across Mariager Fjord by the Bridgettines, the last monastic order to reach Denmark before the Reformation, on land acquired in the late 1420s from the dissolved Randers Abbey.

1439

- Eric of Pomerania is deposed by the National Councils of Denmark and Sweden, succeeded in the following year by his nephew Christopher of Bavaria.

== Deaths ==
1431

- 15 July – Jens Andersen Lodehat, bishop
