= Anders Arrebo =

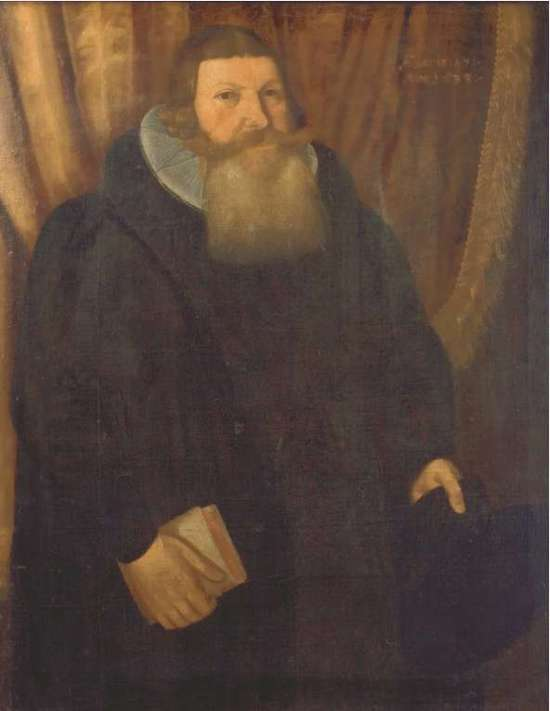
Anders Arrebo

Anders Christensen Arrebo (2 January 1587 in Ærøskøbing – 12 March 1637) was a Danish poet and Lutheran bishop. He was appointed bishop to the Diocese of Trondhjem in 1618, but had to leave office in 1622. His main contribution to literature is the poem Hexaëmeron.

Church of Norway titles
Preceded by Isak Grønbech	Bishop of Trondhjem; 1618–1622	Succeeded by Peder Skjelderup
