= Otto Grote zu Schauen =

German politician (?-1693)

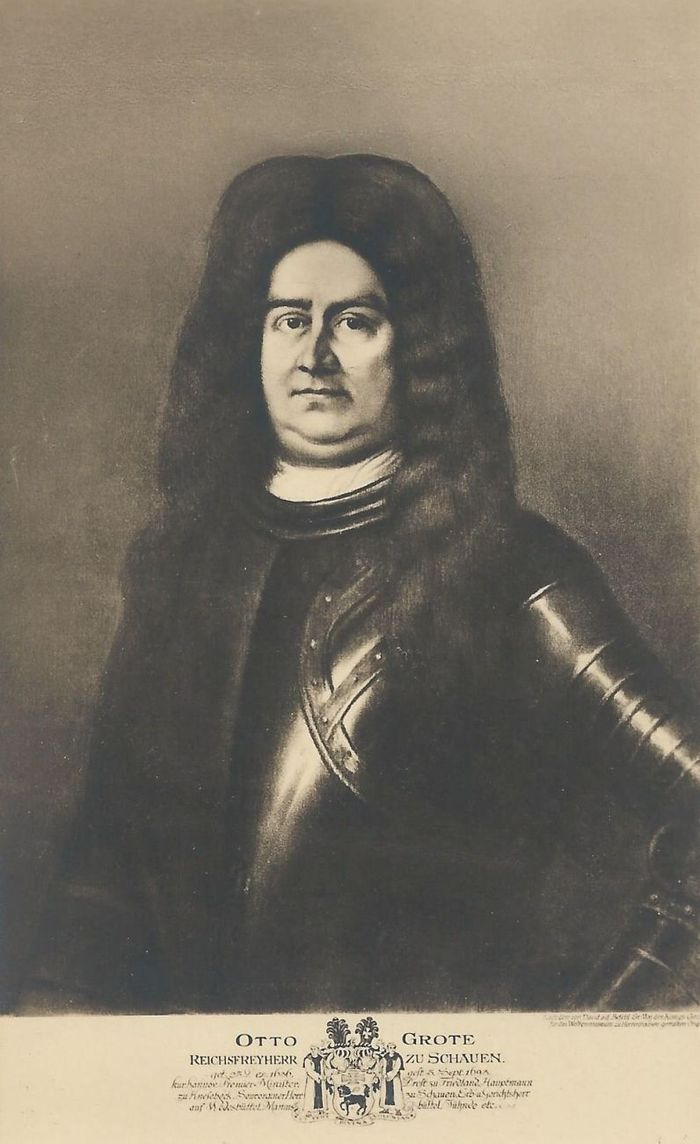
Otto Grote Reichsfreyherr zu Schauen with Allonge wig and in body armor

Baron Otto Grote zu Schauen (25 December 1636 O.S. / 4 January 1637 N.S. – 5/15 September 1693) was a Hanoverian statesman. His correspondence with Gottfried Wilhelm Leibniz is now part of UNESCO’s Memory of the World Programme.

== Life ==
He was born in Sønderborg (Duchy of Schleswig), and came from a noble lineage. After the Thirty Years' War, he studied at the University of Helmstedt and the University of Leiden and then went traveling.

From 1665, he was privy councilor and chamberlain of initially Johann Friedrich, Duke of Brunswick-Lüneburg, and then the duke's younger brother and successor, Ernest Augustus, Elector of Hanover. De facto he was eventually the Prime minister what became due to his efforts in 1692 the Electorate of Hanover.

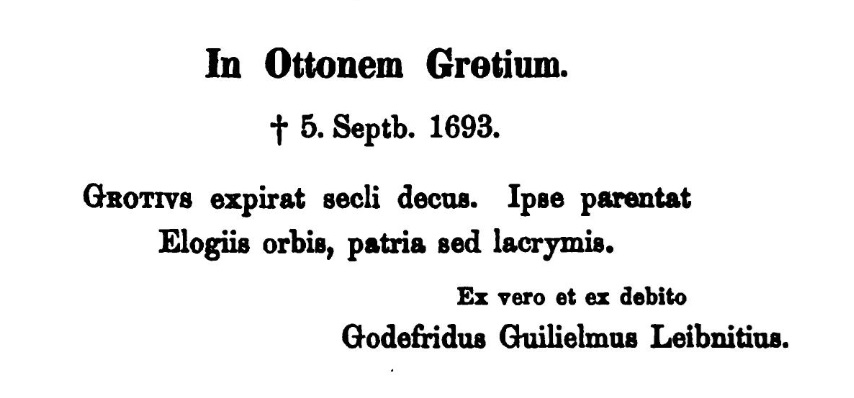
Distich from Leibniz (in Latin)

He died in Hamburg in the midst of negotiations with Denmark over Saxe-Lauenburg. Gottfried Wilhelm Leibniz wrote a couplet on his death.
