= Oliger Jacobaeus =

Oliger Jacobaeus (1650-1701), also known as Holger Jacobi, was a Danish physician and naturalist. He was professor of medicine, philosophy, history, and geography at University of Copenhagen.

He authored several treatises, notably, Compendium Institutionum Medicarum, De Ranis dissertatio, Romae, Bartholomei Scalae equitis Florentini historia Florentinorum and others. He was appointed by Frederick IV of Denmark as counsellor in his court of justice in 1698 as a token of appreciation.

== Early life ==
Oliger Jacobaeus (1650-1701), also known as Holger Jacobi, was born in Aarhus, Denmark, in 1650. He dedicated his early academic pursuits to the study of anatomy, attending both the University of Copenhagen and the University of Florence. Jacobaeus embarked on extensive travels across several European countries, including France, Germany, Italy, Hungary, England, and the Netherlands. His formal medical training culminated in receiving his Doctor of Medicine degree from Leiden University.

Jacobaeus was married twice. His first marriage, to Anne Marguerete Bartholin, lasted seventeen years and produced six sons. After his first wife's passing, he married Anne Tistorph. He was the son-in-law of the prominent Danish anatomist, physician, and theologian Thomas Bartholin, and was also a leading figure within Bartholin's organization of comparative anatomists. Jacobaeus later became a professor of medicine, philosophy, history, and geography at the University of Copenhagen. He died in 1701.

== His works ==
- De Ranis dissertatio, Romae in 1676.
- Bartholomei Scalae equitis Florentini historia Florentinorum in 1677.
- Oratio in obitum Tho, Bartholini in 1681.
- Compendium institutionum medicarum in 1684.
- De Ranis & Lacertis dissertatio in 1686.
- Francisci Ariosti de oleo mentis Zibinii, seu petroleo agri Mutinensis in 1690.
- Panegyricus Christiano Vto dictus in 1691.
- Gaudia Arctoi orbis ob thalamos augustos Frederici & Ludovicae in 1691.
- Museum regium, sive catalogus rerum, &c. quee in basilica bibliotheca Christiani V. Hafnise asservantur in 1696.
