= Heinrich Jansen =

Danish Baroque painter

Heinrich Jansen (1625 – 1667), was a Danish Baroque painter.

== Biography ==
He was born in Flensburg and trained under Rembrandt during the years 1645–1648. He worked in Copenhagen 1657–1661 as court painter to Frederick III of Denmark and in 1662 returned to live in Flensburg.
