= Henrik Gerner (bishop) =

Danish bishop

Right Reverend Henrik Gerner
- Bishop of Diocese of Viborg
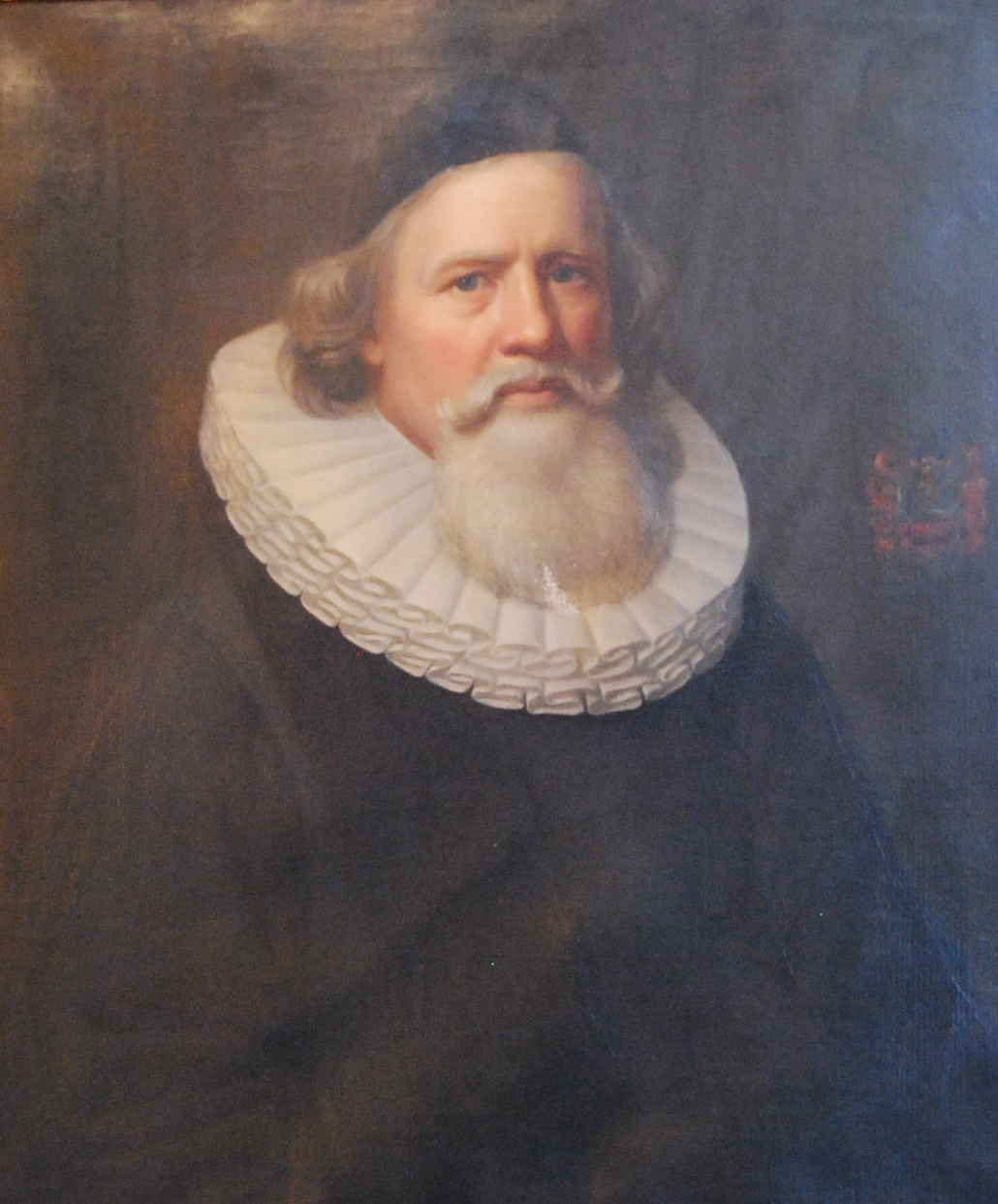
- Portrait painting in Birkerød Church
- Church: Church of Denmark
- Diocese: Diocese of Zealand
- In office: 1693–1700
- Predecessor: Søren Glud
- Successor: Bartholomæus Deichman

Personal details
- Born: 9 December 1629 Copenhagen, Denmark
- Died: 13 May 1700 (aged 70) Viborg, Denmark
- Denomination: Christian
- Occupation: Priest/bishop

Bishop Henrik Gerner (9 December 1629 – 13 May 1700) was a Dane who studied theology and travelled extensively in England. From 1656, at the age of 27, he became the parish priest for Birkerød (north of Copenhagen) and in 1693 until his death, he was appointed bishop of Viborg.

== Early life and education ==
Gerner was born on 9 December 1629 in Copenhagen, the son of merchant Thomas G. (died ca. 1673) and Karen Henriks-datter. He was originally intended for a commercial career, but a private tutor convinced his father that he should have an academic education. Gerner matriculated from Our Lady's School in 1650. He earned an attestats certificate in 1652. For two years, he then worked as an assistant for rector Zacharias Lund at Herludsholm School, In 1654, he earned a bachelor's degree from Sorø Academy. In 1654, he continued his studies in England and the Netherlands.

== Captivity ==
In 1659, during the Second Northern War, Gerner was briefly imprisoned, tortured, held in chains and sentenced to death, by Swedish authorities for plotting the recapture of Kronborg. The sentence was not carried out after the Danish King Frederick III threatened reprisals. He was instead held imprisoned for eighteen weeks and had to pay a hefty fine before release. On release, he took his 36 pound chains with him to Birkerød church, where they are now displayed. The scars from his treatment in prison were a constant reminder for the rest of his life.

== Intellectual interests ==
A man of lively literary interests, he published two works in Latin in 1662 promoting a form of social ethics. He translated the works of the Greek poet Hesiod and several lesser poets. He was in disagreement with his fellow priest Peder Syv's attempts at spelling reform of the Danish language, and an avid opponent of the use of foreign words in the Danish language. He also contributed to Peder Lauridsen Kylling's botanical work Viridarium Danicum.

== Personal life and legacy ==
In 1656, Gerner married Dorothea Jensdatter Bircherod (1636–1705). She was a daughter of Lutheran minister in Birkerød Jens Hermansen Bircherod (1588–1657), and his second wife Maren Jacobsdatter (1593–1665).

The street Henrik Gerners Vej in Birkerød was named in honour of Gerner. A granite bust of Gerner created by the sculptor Johannes Kragh was installed opposite Birkerød Church in 1917. A modern church extension housing the church administrative offices plus meeting rooms and a memorial hall was completed in 1979. A copy of Gerner's shackles hangs near the entrance and is used in historic reenactments.

== Gallery ==
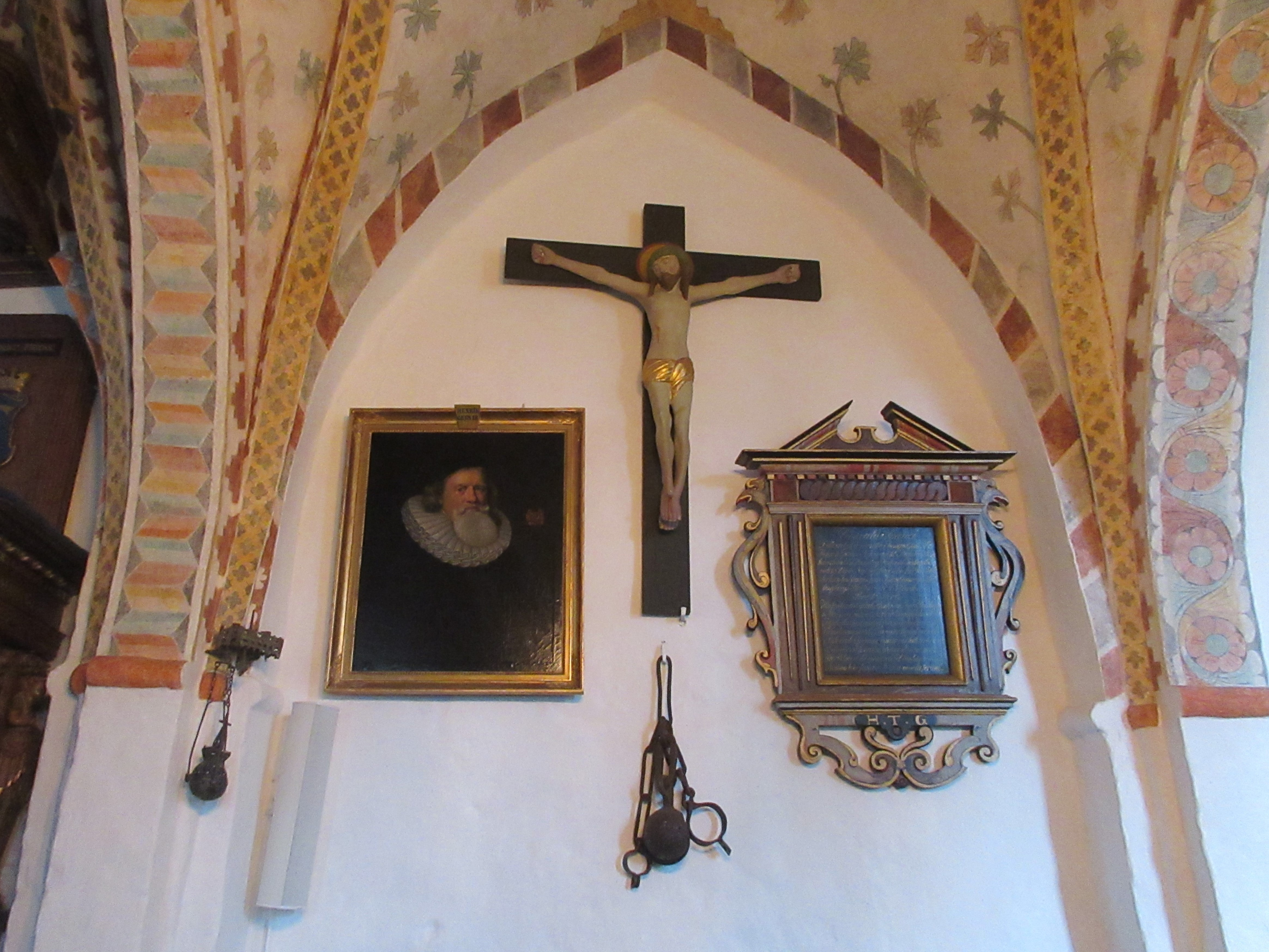
Epitaph to Gerner, as well as a portrait painting of him and his chains in Birkerød Church

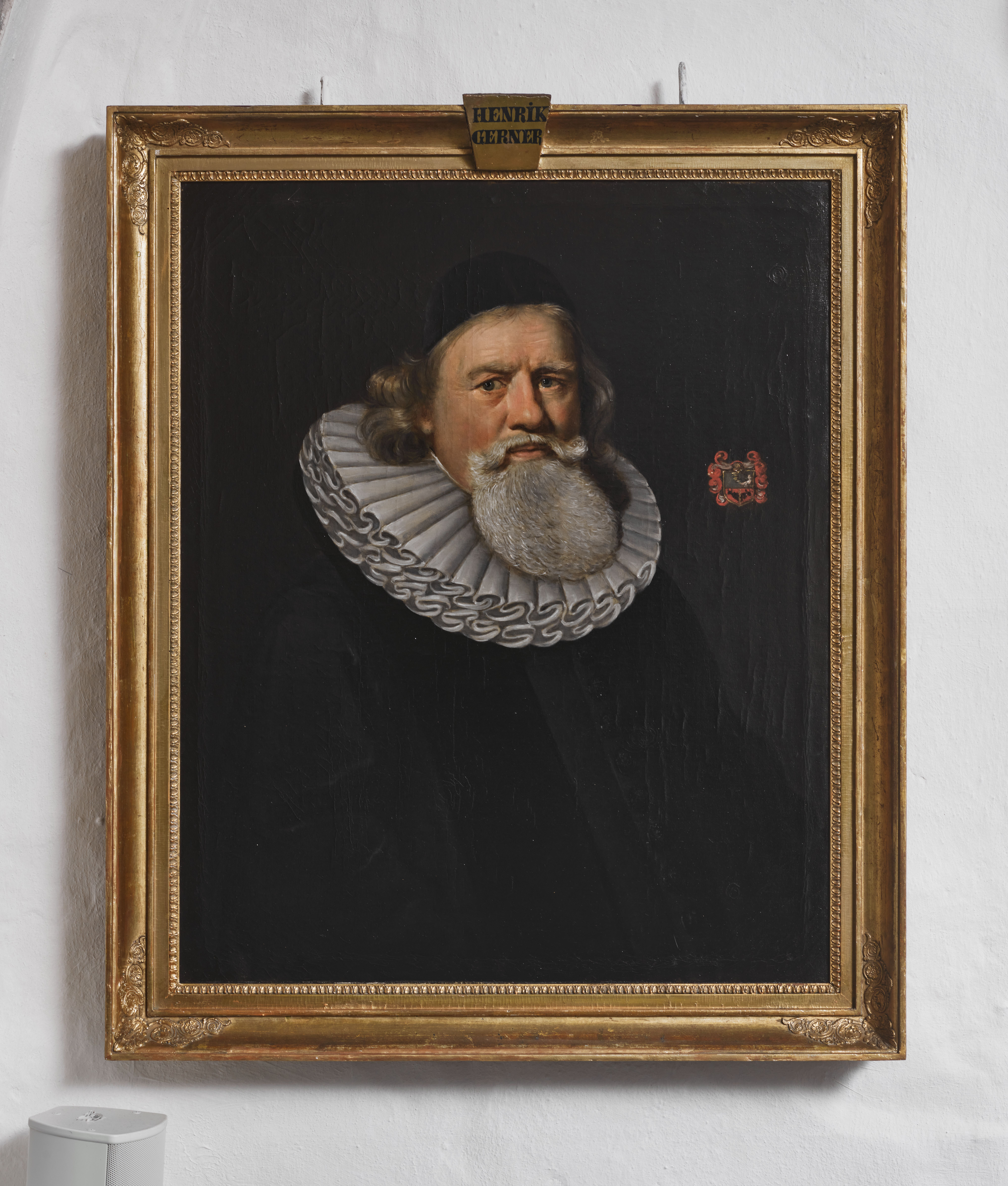
Close-up of the portrait of Gerner in Birkerød Church

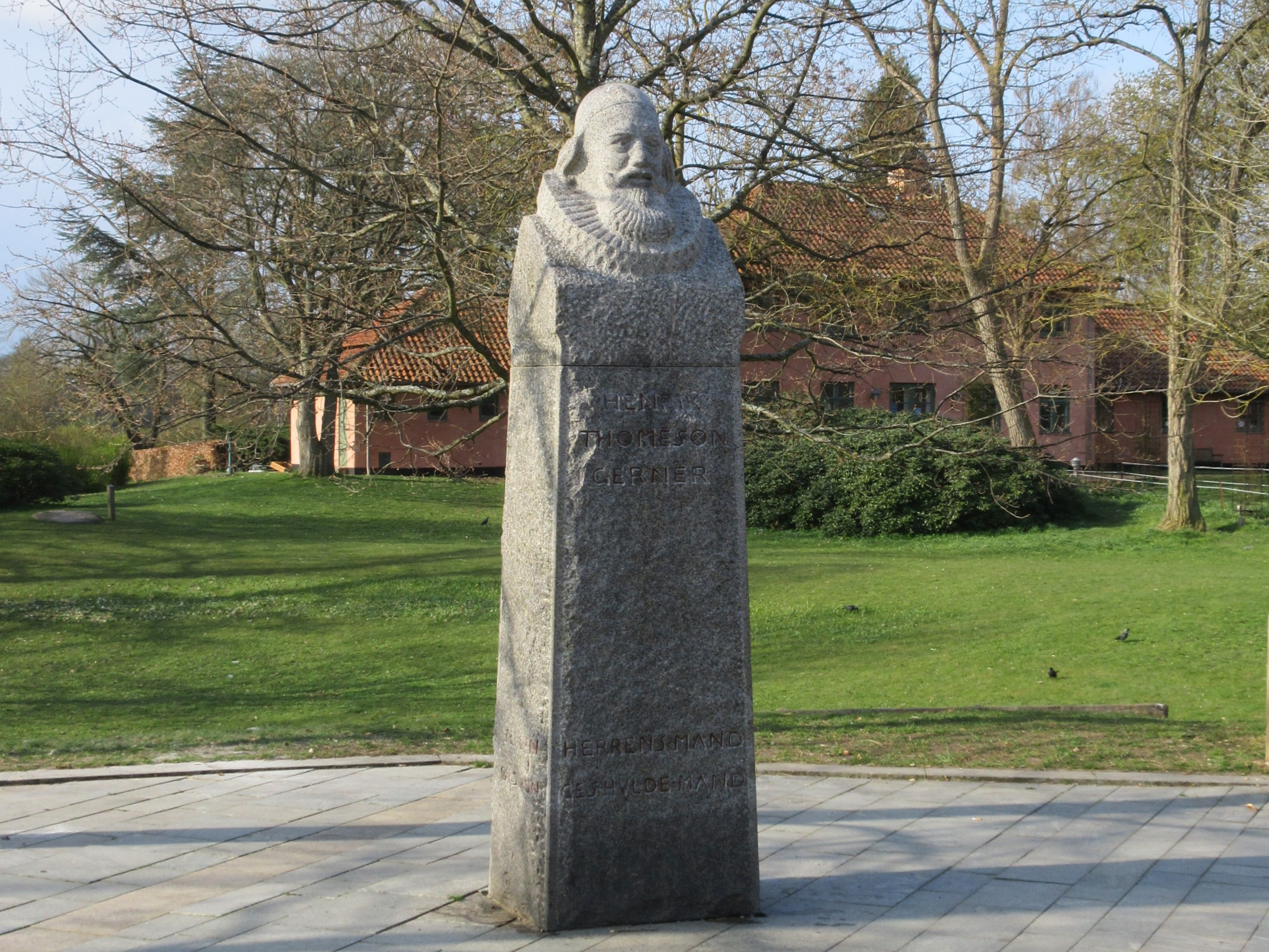
Bust of Gerner in front of Birkerød Church

== See also ==
Articles on Danish Wikipedia:

- His greatgrandson da:Henrik Gerner (skibskonstruktør)
- da:Henrik Gerner (biskop)

== Citations in Danish ==
- Salmonsens konversationsleksikon (under Projekt Runeberg). Both Gerners appear on the same page.
- Bricka, C F in Projekt Runeberg, Dansk Biografisk Lexikon. Vol 5 Page 607 - 614 - Henrik Gerner
- Bistrup Kirke (Birkerød) Gerner building
