= Brita Scheel =

Birgitte "Brita" Scheel (1638–1699), was a Danish noblewoman who married a Danish nobleman who became Swedish with the annexation of Denmark's eastern provinces. For that reason, Birgitte belongs both to Danish and Swedish history, and her family lives on in the now Swedish province of Scania (Skåne).

== Biography ==
Birgitte Scheel (Skeel) was the daughter of the Danish chancellor Christen Albretsen Scheel (1603–59) and Birgitte Rud (1612–45). She married the vice president of the High Court of Western Sweden Göta Hovrätt, the Scanian nobleman Christian Barnekow (1626–66) in 1660, the Danish chancellor count Christoffer Parsberg (1632–71) in 1669 and then the powerful Scanian nobleman and Danish Chancellor of the Realm Knud Thott (1639–1702) in 1682.

Scheel made herself much talked about by her contemporaries. She was close friends with the powerful courtier and politician Griffenfeld who later fell into disgrace. In 1659, at her father's funeral in Copenhagen, Brita Scheel took possession of the document where the Danish nobility gave its consent to the Danish absolutism and turned it over to the Swedish Royal House despite demands from the Danish royal House to have it back. An incident for which she became renowned occurred during a visit in Zealand Själland. During a stay at an inn while travelling, her Coachman was murdered by highwaymen without her notice, and one of them took his place with the intent to attack her out on the road. During the trip, however, Scheel threw her Garter (stockings) around the neck of the false usher and strangled him from behind, after which she took over the reins. For this act, she was depicted holding a Garter (stockings)

While she dwelled in Scania with her family there, her estate in Denmark proper, Køgegård, was given rights as an independent Jurisdiction area. She was a competent and efficient estate manager. In 1678, she was the target of a famous attempted murder by her lady's companion Agnete Sophie Budde. Between 1679 and 1682, she lived on her estate Vittskövle in the eastern province of Scania (Skåne) which had been conquered by the Swedes in 1658 and then ravaged by various bitter wars. In Scania, she tried to oppose the Swedification policy by insisting on appointing Danish vicars. In 1682, she married the Scanian nobleman Knud Thott who had been governor of the district of Landscrone (now Landskrona in Sweden) during the Scanian War. He was one of the most powerful Scanians of his day and together with his sister Jytte's husband Jörgen Krabbe, he participated actively in Swedish politics, representing Scania and the Scanians, but he and his family became embittered against the Swedes. During the war, the entire Danish-born nobility in Scania was deported north of the border and Jörgen Krabbe was executed by the Swedes. Knud chose to participate in the battle for Scania and Denmark. The rest of the Thotts fled for their lives to Denmark proper. Knud Thott was sentenced to death in his absence by the Swedes in 1678, and executed in effigie in Malmö. Later, he was pardoned and some of his Scanian estates were given back to him, but he chose never to return home again. Because of her new husband's situation, the Skeel-Thotts stayed in Denmark for the rest of their lives, although Birgitte had a son in Scania and Knud also had children and other family there.
