= 1640 in Denmark =

Events from the year 1640 in Denmark.

== Incumbents ==
- Monarch – Christian IV

== Events ==
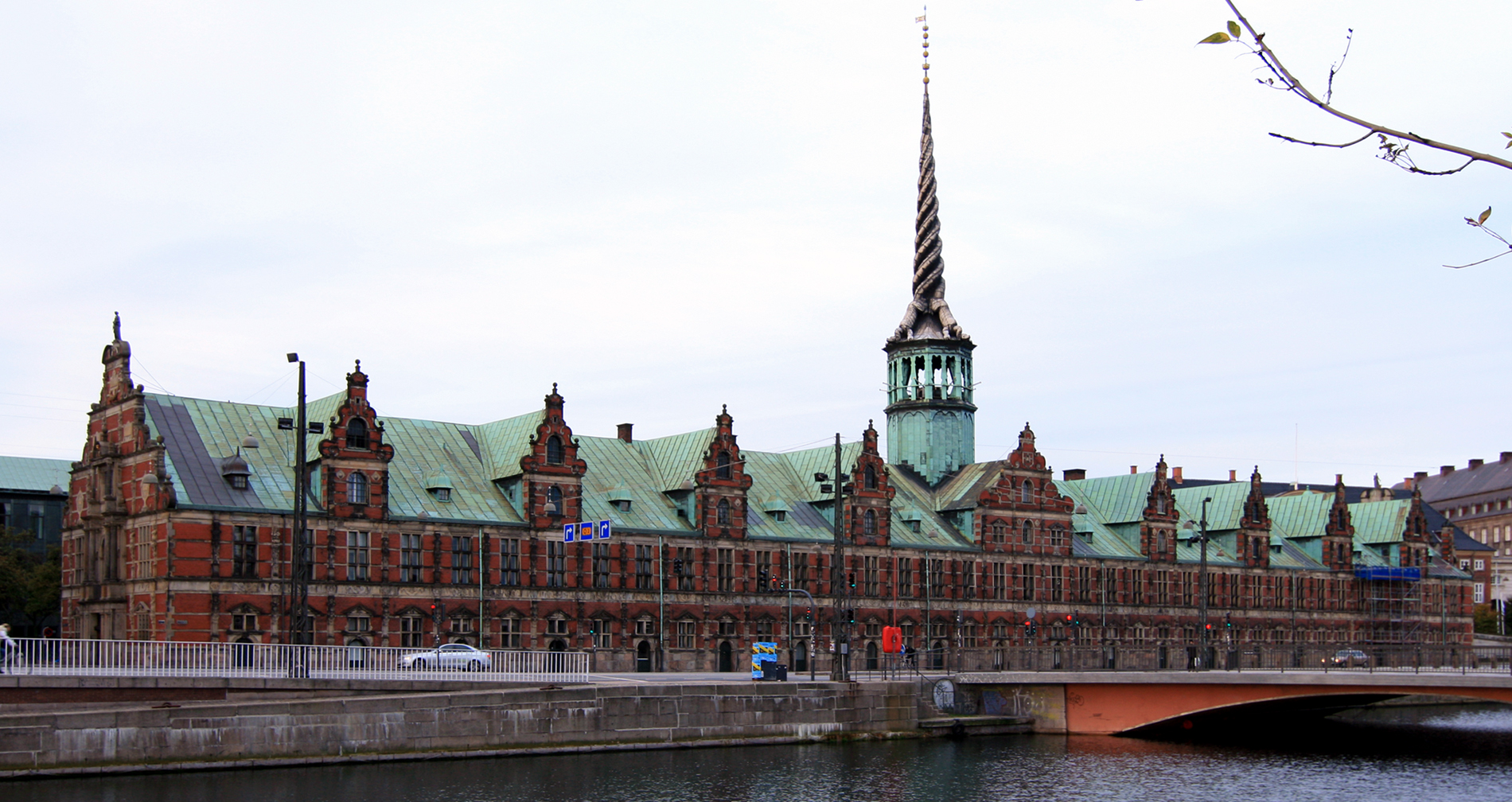
Børsen, completed in 1640 (construction started in 1619).

- Børsen (the stock exchange in Copenhagen) was finished. It is considered to be an example of Dutch Renaissance style in Denmark. It’s located in Slotsholmen next to The Parliament of Denmark’s building: The Christiansborg Palace. Børsen is a popular tourist attraction and is known for its distinctive spire, which is shaped like the tails of four dragons twined together.

== Births ==
- 6 October – Christian Ulrik Gyldenløve, military officer and diplomat (born 1611).

== Deaths ==
- 1 April – Georg Mohr, mathematician (died 1697)
