= Christen Sørensen Longomontanus =

Danish astronomer (1562-1647)

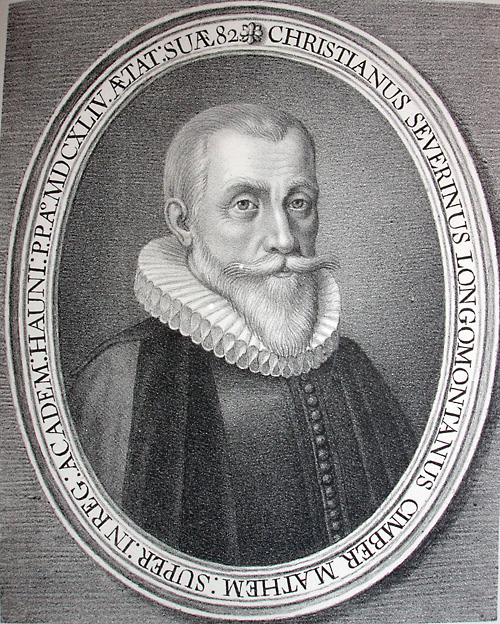
- Christen Sørensen Longomontanus
- Born: 4 October 1562; Jutland, Denmark
- Died: 8 October 1647 (aged 85); Copenhagen
- Education: University of Rostock
- Scientific career
- Fields: Astronomy
- Workplaces: University of Copenhagen

Christen Sørensen Longomontanus (also as Longberg or Severin) (4 October 1562 – 8 October 1647) was a Danish astronomer.

The name Longomontanus was a Latinized form of the name of the village of Lomborg, Jutland, Denmark, where he was born. His father, a laborer called Søren, or Severin, died when Christen was eight years old. An uncle took charge of the child, and had him educated at Lemvig; but after three years sent him back to his mother, who needed his help to work the fields. She agreed that he could study during the winter months with the clergyman of the parish; this arrangement continued until 1577, when the ill-will of some of his relatives and his own desire for knowledge caused him to run away to Viborg.

There he attended the grammar school, working as a labourer to pay his expenses, and in 1588 went to Copenhagen with a high reputation for learning and ability. Engaged by Tycho Brahe in 1589 as his assistant in his great astronomical observatory of Uraniborg, he rendered invaluable service for eight years. He held Tycho Brahe in the highest regard and always supported his system and tried to improve upon it throughout his life. However, he did disagree with the Tycho Brahe's system in some regards, he believed that the earth rotated unlike his master's theory that it was immobile. During this time, Kepler joined the two in trying to come up with a theory on how to predict longitude at oppositions with complete accuracy. Longomontanus used Mars as a model for this. Having left the island of Hven with his master, he obtained his discharge at Copenhagen on 1 June 1597, in order to study at some German universities. He rejoined Tycho at Prague in January 1600, and having completed the Tychonic lunar theory, turned homeward again in August. Soon after this, Tycho Brahe's untimely demise happened. After Tycho managed to become a mathematician that served the Emperor Rudolph II, he died in October 1601. The Emperor had to appoint a new Mathematician. When doing so, the expected choice would have been Longomontanus since he was Tycho's preferred choice. However, Longomontanus was in Denmark at this time, whereas Johannes Kepler was there, so he was appointed.

He visited Frauenburg, where Copernicus had made his observations, took a master's degree at Rostock, and at Copenhagen found a patron in Christian Friis, chancellor of Denmark, who employed him in his household. Appointed in 1603 rector of the school of Viborg, he was elected two years later to a professorship in the University of Copenhagen, and his promotion to the chair of mathematics ensued in 1607. This post was held by Longomontanus till his death in 1647.

He adhered to Tycho's erroneous views about refraction, believed that comets were messengers of evil, and imagined that he had squared the circle. He found that the circle whose diameter is 43 has for its circumference the square root of 18252 which gives 3.14185... for the value of π. John Pell and others tried in vain to convince him of his error. In 1632 he started the construction of the Rundetårn (a stately astronomical tower in Copenhagen), but did not live to witness its completion. King Christian IV of Denmark, to whom he dedicated his Astronomia Danica, an exposition of the Tychonic system of the universe, conferred upon him the canonry of Lunden in Schleswig.

Longomontanus's major contribution to science was to develop Tycho's geoheliocentric model of the universe empirically and publicly to common acceptance. When Tycho died in 1601, his program for the restoration of astronomy was unfinished. The observational aspects were complete, but two important tasks remained, namely the selection and integration of the data into accounts of the motions of the planets, and the presentation of the results on the entire program in the form of a systematic treatise. Longomontanus assumed the responsibility and fulfilled both tasks in his voluminous Astronomia Danica (1622). Regarded as the testament of Tycho, the work was eagerly received in seventeenth-century astronomical literature. The book was highly accredited and many famous owners included Christopher Wren, Christiaan Huygens as well as the Royal Greenwich Observatory in England. The book mainly compared the three world systems of the time, these included the Copernican, Tycho Brahe and Ptolemy schools of thought. But unlike Tycho's, the geoheliocentric model of Longomontanus gave the Earth a proper daily rotation which he kept from the Copernican model. (as in the models of Ursus and Roslin. Longomontanus in Astronomia Danica points out that Ursus's model wrongly has the orbit of Mars fully encircling the Sun's, which he copied from a crude drawing he had once seen at Tycho's mural wall.). It is therefore sometimes called the 'semi-Tychonic' system. The book was reprinted in 1640 and 1663, which indicates its popularity and the interest in the semi-Tychonic system in this period.

Having originally worked on calculating the Martian orbit for Tycho with Kepler, he had already modelled its orbit in his geoheliocentric model to an error in longitude of under 2 arcminutes when Kepler had still only achieved 8 arcminutes error in his heliocentric system, as he had not yet used elliptical orbits.

Some historians claim Kepler's 1627 Rudolphine Tables, based on Tycho Brahe's observations, were more accurate than any previous tables. But nobody has ever demonstrated they were more accurate than Longomontanus's 1622 Danish Astronomy tables, also based upon Tycho's observations.

== Publications ==
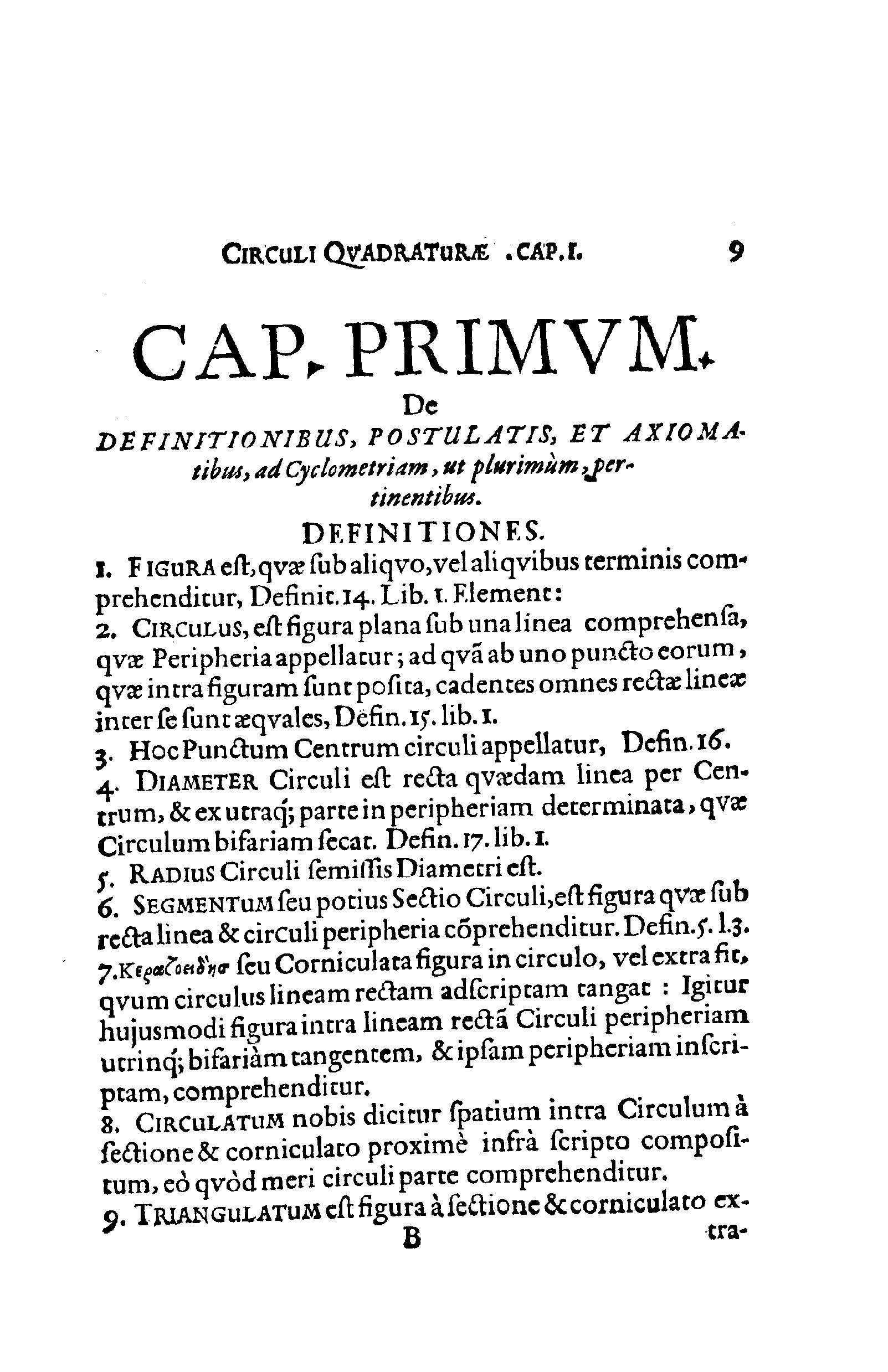
Inventio quadraturae circuli, 1634

His major works in mathematics and astronomy were:

- Systematis Mathematici, etc. (1611)
- Cyclometria e Lunulis reciproce demonstrata, etc. (1612)
- Disputatio de Eclipsibus (1616)
- Astronomia Danica, etc. (1622)
- Astronomia Danica (in Latin). Amsterdam: Willem Jansz Blaeu. 1622.
- Disputationes quatuor Astrologicae (1622)
- Pentas Problematum Philosophiae (1623)
- De Chronolabio Historico, seu de Tempore Disputationes tres (1627)
- Geometriae quaesita XIII. de Cyclometria rationali et vera (1631)
- Inventio Quadraturae Circuli (1634)
- Disputatio de Matheseos Indole (1636)
- Coronis Problematica ex Mysteriis trium Numerorum (1637)
- Problemata duo Geometrica (1638)
- Problema contra Paulum Guldinum de Circuli Mensura (1638)
- Introductio in Theatrum Astronomicum (1639)
- Rotundi in Plano, etc. (1644)
- Admiranda Operatio trium Numerorum 6, 7, 8, etc. (1645)
- Caput tertium Libri primi de absoluta Mensura Rotundi plani, etc. (1646)

== Eponymy ==
- The lunar crater Longomontanus was named after him. It is located near the Tycho crater.
