= 1657 in Denmark =

- Decades: 1630s; 1640s; 1650s; 1660s; 1670s
- See also: Other events of 1657; List of years in Denmark

Events from the year 1657 in Denmark.

== Incumbents ==
- Monarch – Frederick III
- Steward of the Realm – Joachim Gersdorff

== Events ==
- 14 August – The first execution at Nytorv in Copenhagen takes place.

== Births ==
- 1 December – Karen Brahe, book collector (born 1736)

Undated

- Hans Nobel, landowner and civil servant (died 1732)

== Deaths ==
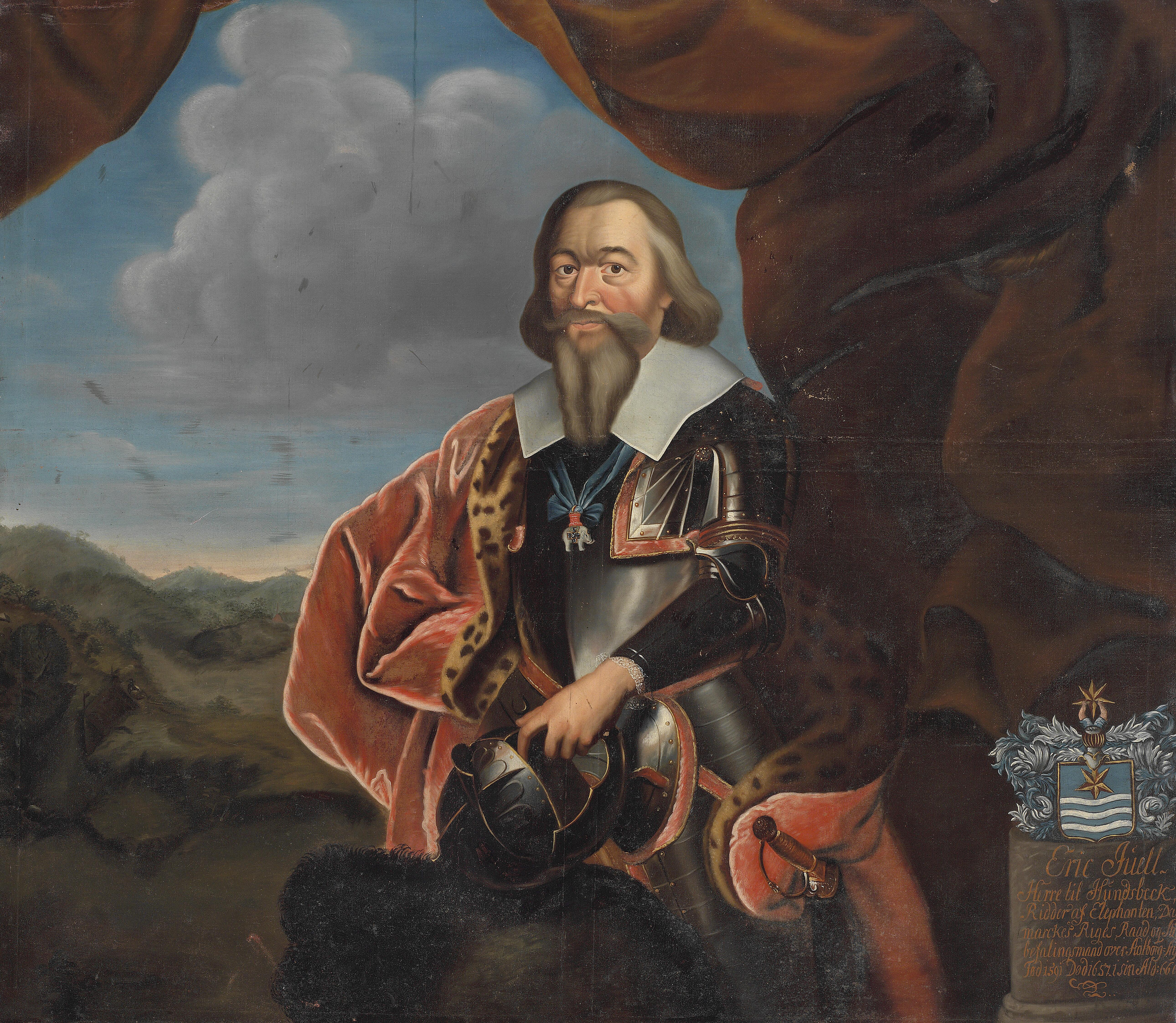
Erik Juel.

- 13 February – Erik Juel, noble Privy Councillor (born 1591)
- 23 February – Erik Juel, statesman (born 1691)
- 29 April – Sophie Elisabeth Pentz, countess (born 1619)
- 10 November – Anders Bille, Marshal of the Realm (born 1600)

Undated

- c. 22 January – Niels Aagaard, librarian and scholar (born 1612)
