= 1659 in Denmark =

- Decades: 1630s; 1640s; 1650s; 1660s; 1670s
- See also: Other events of 1659; List of years in Denmark

Events from the year 1659 in Denmark.

== Incumbents ==
- Monarch – Frederick III
- Steward of the Realm: Joachim Gersdorff

== Events ==
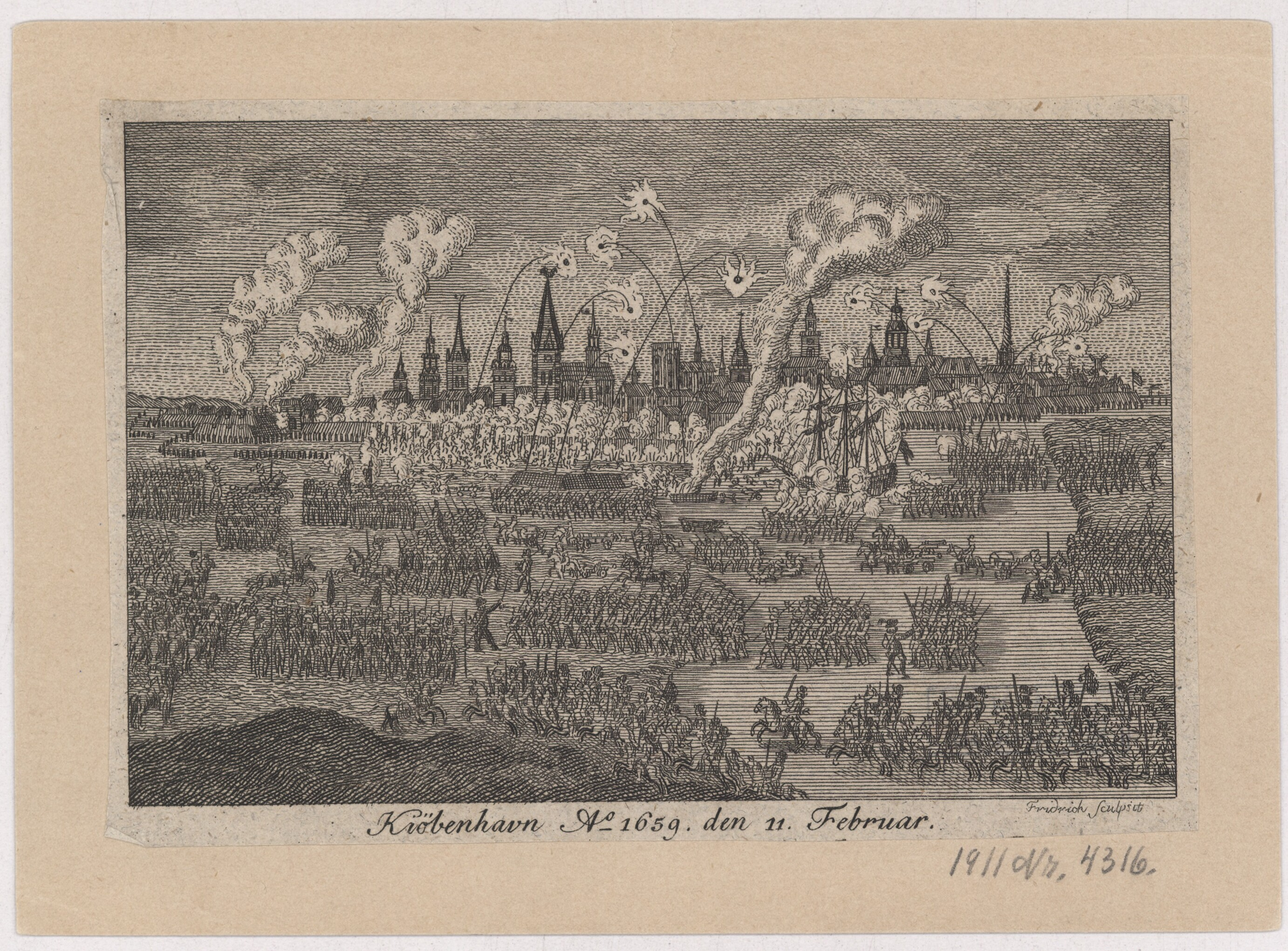
The Assault on Copenhagen on 11 February.

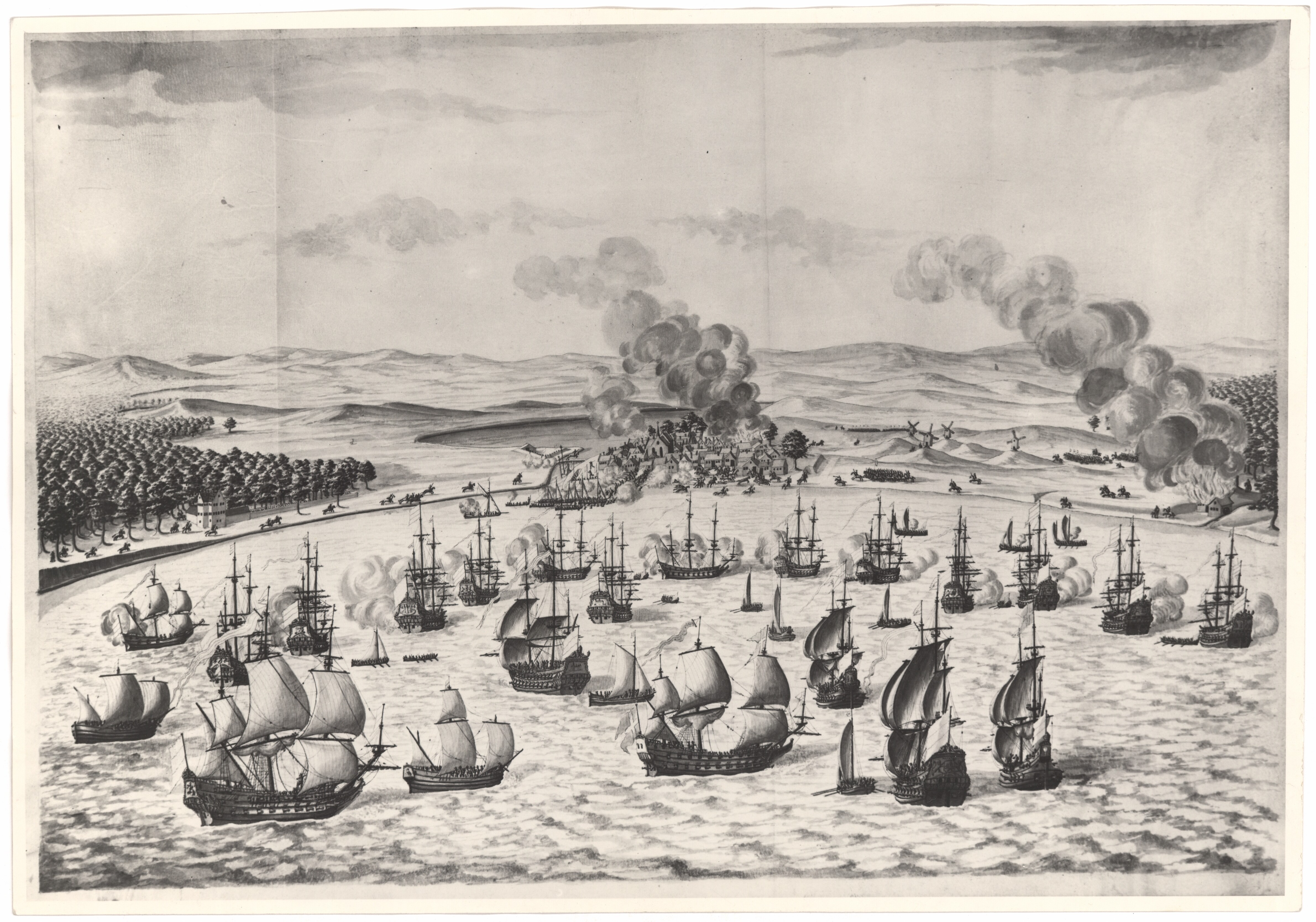
31 October: Dutch ships arrive at Kerteminde to assist Denmark against the Swedish invaders.

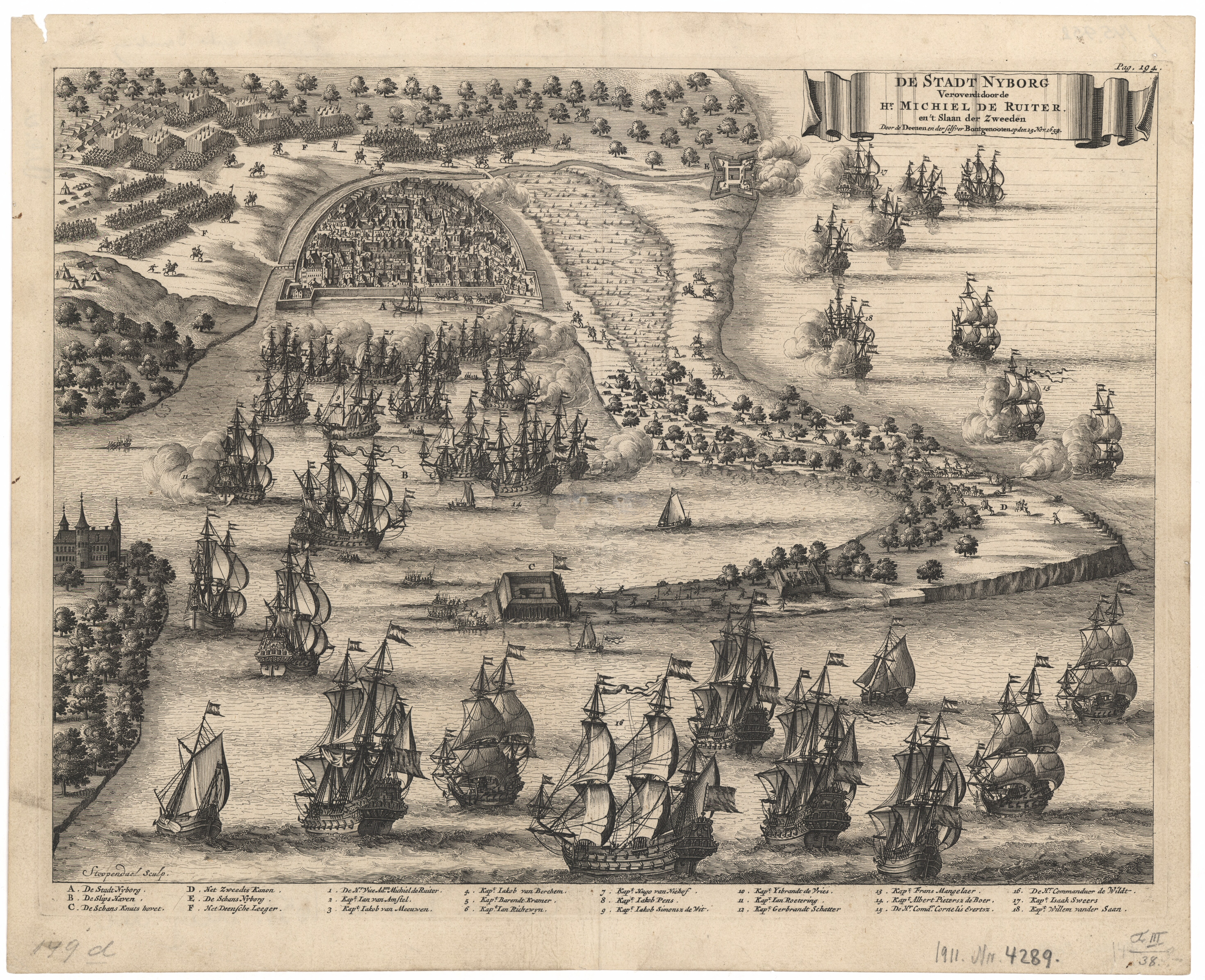
14 November. The Battle of Nyborg..

February

- 10 February and 11 – A Swedish siege of the city during the Second Northern War culminates in the Assault on Copenhagen results in Danish victory.

March

- March – The Danish Africa Company is founded in Glückstadt.
- 24 March – The citizens of Copenhagen are granted privileges of freedom as a reward for their contribution to the defence of the country.

April

- 14 April – The first meeting in CopenhagenCouncil of 32 Men is held.
- 21 May – Signing of the Concert of The Hague, an outline of the common stance of England, France and the Dutch Republic regarding the Second Northern War. The powers agree that the Swedish and Denmark shall settle for a peace treaty based on the Treaty of Roskilde, including free navigation through The Sound and the Baltic Sea based on the Treaty of Elbing. The subsequent Dano-Swedish Peace of Copenhagen largely followed the terms dictated by the Concert of the Hague.

June

- June – A Danish attempt to recapture Kronborg Castle fails. Oluf van Steenwinckel, believed to be the son of the architect Hans van Steenwinckel the Younger, is one of the Danish participants in the attack and is afterwards executed by the Swedish.

August

- August 25 – Armistice followed by five days of peace negotiations in Copenhagen.
- 31 October – Dutch troops land at Kerteminde to assist Denmark against the Swedish invaders. Hans Schack, de Reyter and Henrik Bielke forces the Swedes out of the town.

November

- 14 November – The Battle of Nyborg results in Danish victory.

=== Undated ===
- The plague ravages Denmark, particularly Jutland, probably brought to the country by German and Polish mercenaries.
- Bornholm, previously part of Skåneland, rebels against Sweden, leading to its return to Denmark with the Treaty of Copenhagen the following year..
- Niels Stensen, later known as Nicolas Steno, embarks on his scientific research which will in time gain him a reputation as the father of both anatomy and geology.
- Simon van Slingelandt is appointed Dutch ambassador to Denmark.

== Births ==
- 19 October – Wilhelm Edinger, merchant and ship-owner (died 1733)

=== Full date unknown ===
- Margrethe Lasson, (first ever Danish) novelist (d. 1738)
- Justine Cathrine Rosenkrantz, lady-in-waiting, noble and spy (d. 1746)

== Deaths ==
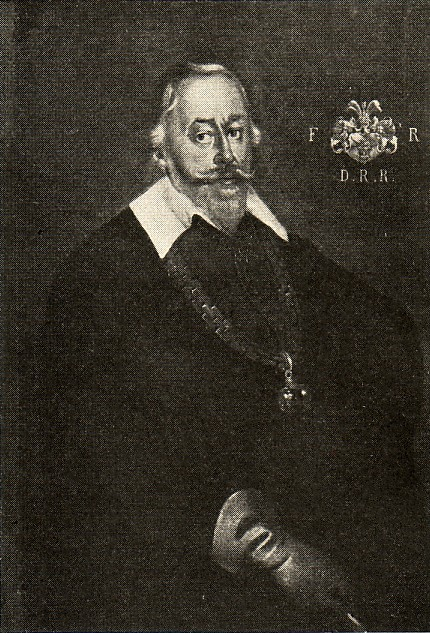
Frederik Reedtz.

- 8 June – Frederik Reedtz, statesman (born 1585)
- 10 August – Frederick III, Duke of Holstein-Gottorp (b. 1597)

=== Full date unknown ===
- Oluf van Steenwinckel, builder, engineer, soldier
- Brita Scheel, noblewoman (b. 1638)
