= 1661 in Denmark =

- Decades: 1640s; 1650s; 1660s; 1670s; 1680s
- See also: Other events of 1661; List of years in Denmark

The following is a list of events that occurred in the year 1661 in Denmark.

== Incumbents ==
- Monarch – Frederick III

== Events ==
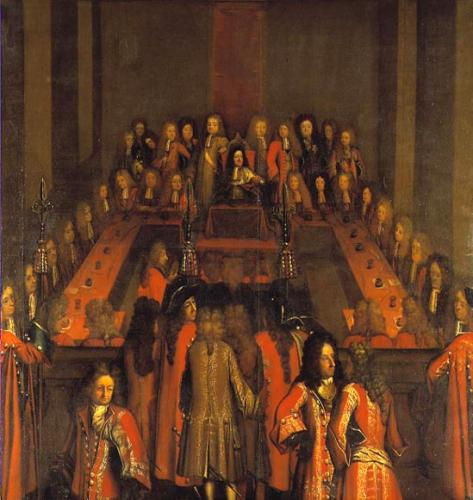
Supreme Court of Denmark, founded on 14 February 1661. Painting from 1694

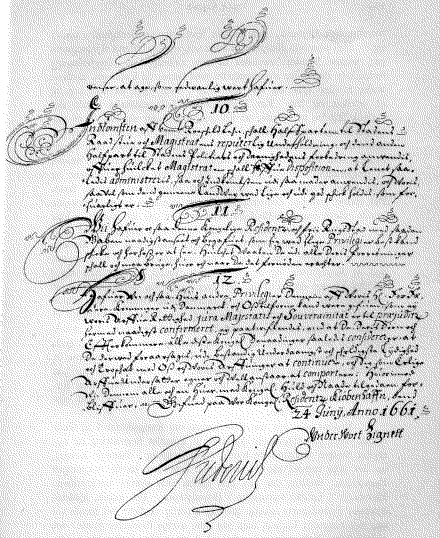
24 June: The last page of the royal letter of privileges issued to the City of Copenhagen

January

- 10 January – The decision to introduce absolute monarchy from the previous year enters into effect.
- 12 January – The State College proposes a comprehensive codification of Danish law, later resulting in the Danish Code of 1683.
- January – The Royal Horse Guards is founded. It is discontinued in 1866.

February

- 14 February – The Supreme Court of Denmark is established.

April

- 16 April – Joachim Gersdorff dies suddenly, giving rise to rumours that he has been poisoned. His wife Øllegaard Huitfeld and a maidservant are convicted of murder.
- 24 April – Auctions are first authorized in Copenhagen and an auction master is engaged.
- 7 May – A tax on marriage is introduced (the so-called kopulationspenge)

June

- 4 June – The so-called Demarcation Line around Copenhagen is introduced when it is prohibited to build in the zone between the city's Fortification Ring and The Lakes.
- 24 June – The Coat of arms of Copenhagen is granted to the city by the king in appraisal of its citizens' efforts in repelling the Swedish siege and attack on the city the previous year. An accompanying royal letter of privilege also introduced various privileges which, however remained of relatively minor importance. The city is also granted the fief Roskilde (Bidstrup estate).* September – Corfitz Ulfeldt and Leonora Christina are released from their imprisonment at Hammershus on the island of Bornholm.

=== Undated ===
- Market towns are given a monopoly on trade and crafts.
- Møgeltønderhus is granted to Count Hans von Schack who demolishes most of it and builds the current Schackenborg Castle.
- Fort Frederiksborg is built on the Danish Gold Coast.

== Births ==
- 27 February – Johannes Møller, educator and writer (died 1725)

== Deaths ==
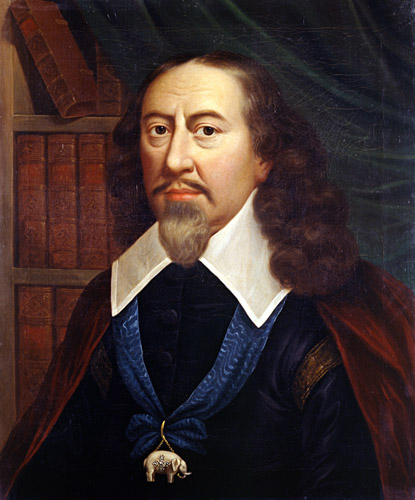
Joachim Gersdorff.

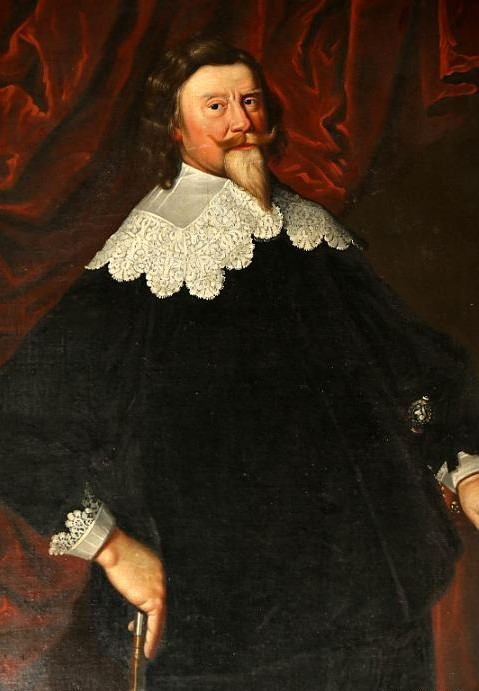
Malte Sehested.

- 19 April – Joachim Gersdorff, Steward of the Realm (b. 1611)
- 19 July – Oluf Parsberg, pricy councillor and landowner (born 1590)
- 20 July – Malte Sehested, military officer and landowner (born 1596)
