= 1734 in Denmark =

- Decades: 1710s; 1720s; 1730s; 1740s; 1750s
- See also: Other events of 1734; List of years in Denmark

Events from the year 1734 in Denmark.

== Incumbents ==
- Monarch – Christian VI
- Prime minister – Iver Rosenkrantz

== Events ==
- 16 April – The County of Christiansholm is established by Christian Raben from the manors of Aalholm, Bramsløkke, Egholm and Stenvængegården.
- 25 October – The Royal Danish Nautical Charts Archive is established.

=== Undated ===
- The shorter of the two Golden Horns of Gallehus is found close to the place where the first one had been found in 1639.

== Births ==
- 8 March– Knud Reedtz, naval officer (born 1663)
- 8 April Georg Hjersing Høst, government official and writer (died 1794)
- 4 October – Heinrich Levetzau, county governor (died 1820)
