= 1656 in Denmark =

- Decades: 1630s; 1640s; 1650s; 1660s; 1670s
- See also: Other events of 1656; List of years in Denmark

Events from the year 1656 in Denmark.

== Incumbents ==
- Monarch – Frederick III
- Steward of the Realm – Joachim Gersdorff

== Births ==
- 11 September – Ulrika Eleonora of Denmark, Queen consort of Sweden (died 1693 in Sweden)

== Deaths ==
- 24 April – Thomas Fincke, mathematician and physicist (b. 1561)
