= 1655 in Denmark =

- Decades: 1630s; 1640s; 1650s; 1660s; 1670s
- See also: Other events of 1655; List of years in Denmark

Events from the year 1655 in Denmark.

== Incumbents ==
- Monarch – Frederick III
- Steward of the Realm – Joachim Gersdorff

== Events ==
=== Undated ===
- Paul Kurtz comes to Denmark from Germany where he later becomes Goldsmith to the Danish-Norwegian Court

== Culture ==
=== Art ===
- Abel Schrøder completes an elaborately carved Cartilage Baroque-style altarpiece for Vester Egesborg Church in Næstved.
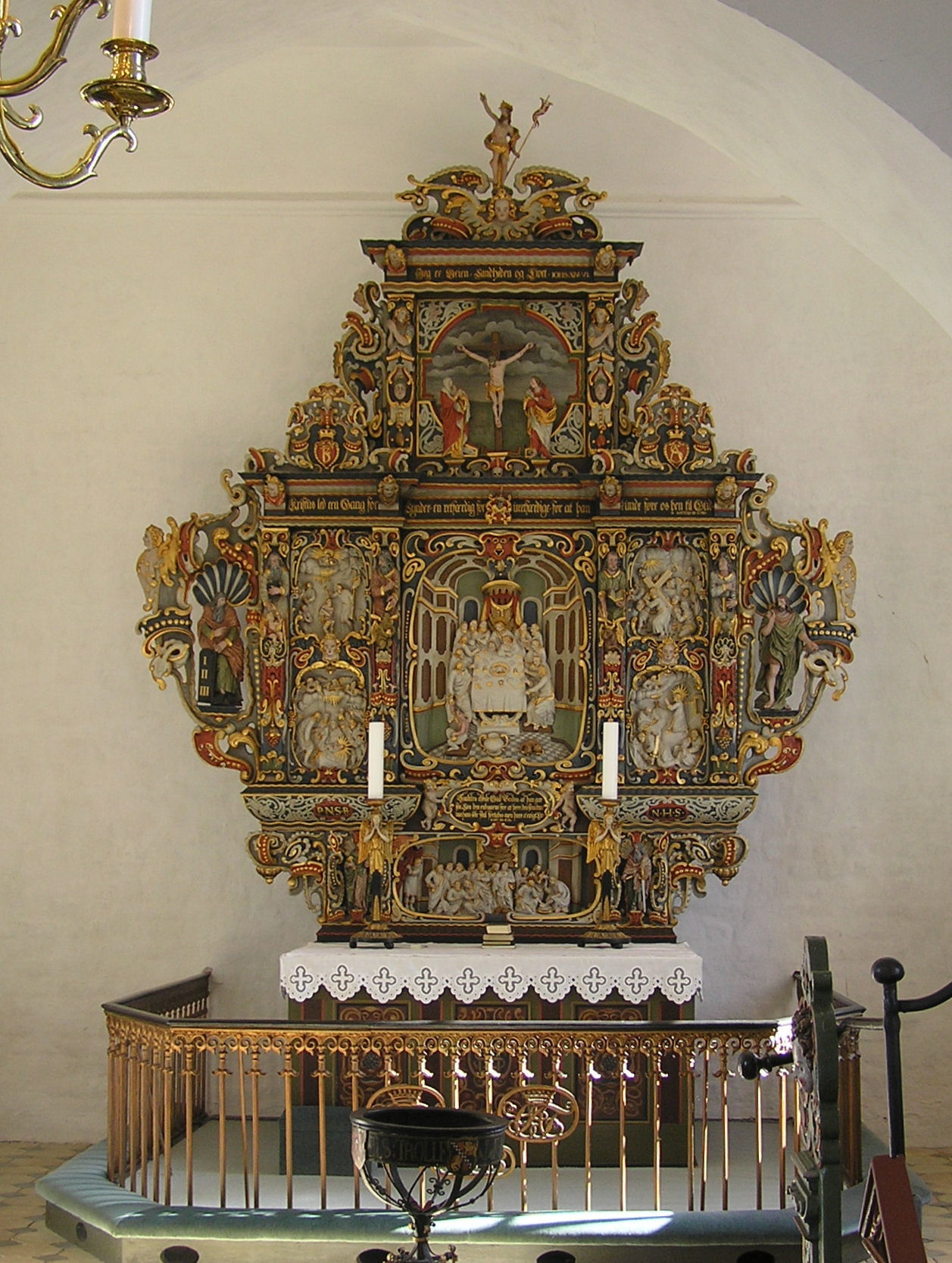
Abel Schrøder's altarpiece in Vester Egesborg Church.

== Births ==
- 6 March – Frederik Krag, civil servant (died 1728)
- 7 July – Axel Juel, governor of Danish India (died 1720)
- 10 September – Caspar Bartholin the Younger, anatomist (died 1738)
- 1 December – Bendix Grodtschilling the Younger, painter (died 1707)

== Deaths ==
- 9 February – Caspar Fincke, court smith (born 1584)
- 9 June – Laurids Mortensen Scavenius, clergyman (born 1599)
- 31 August – Ole Worm, physician and antiquary (born 1588)

=== Full date missing ===
- Poul Hansen Korsør, colonial administrator
