= 1654 in Denmark =

- Decades: 1630s; 1640s; 1650s; 1660s; 1670s
- See also: Other events of 1654; List of years in Denmark

Events from the year 1654 in Denmark.

== Incumbents ==
- Monarch – Frederick III
- Steward of the Realm – Joachim Gersdorff

== Events ==
- 12 August – Total solar eclipse across large parts of Jutland, Funen and Zealand.
- 1 October – Formal diplomatic relations with the United Kingdom begins: The United Kingdom opens an embassy in Copenhagen. Denmark has an embassy in London.

Undated

- John Maurice, Prince of Nassau-Siegen presents Frederick III with a collection of works by Albert Eckhout from Brazil, comprising eight full-length portraits of local people of varying ethnicity, 12 still lifes of local produce and vegetation and three portraits.

== Births ==
- 28 March – Sophie Amalie Moth, royal mistress (died 1719)
- 5 June – Hans Munch, theologian and priest, bishop of Christianssand and of Christiania (died 1712).
- 8 April – Peder Krog, bishop (died 1731 in Norway)
