= 1736 in Denmark =

- Decades: 1710s; 1720s; 1730s; 1740s; 1750s
- See also: Other events of 1736; List of years in Denmark

Events from the year 1736 in Denmark.

== Incumbents ==
- Monarch – Christian VI
- Prime minister – Johan Ludvig Holstein-Ledreborg

== Events ==
- 30 April – Theatrum Anatomico-chirurgicum is inaugurated in Copenhagen and an exam in surgery is introduced.
- 7 November – Laurits S. Winther establishes a ropewalk at Sortebrødre Torv in Odense which will eventually become Roulunds Fabrikker.

=== Undated ===
- Kurantbanken is established.
- The University of Copenhagen introduces a Candidate of Law degree.

== Culture ==
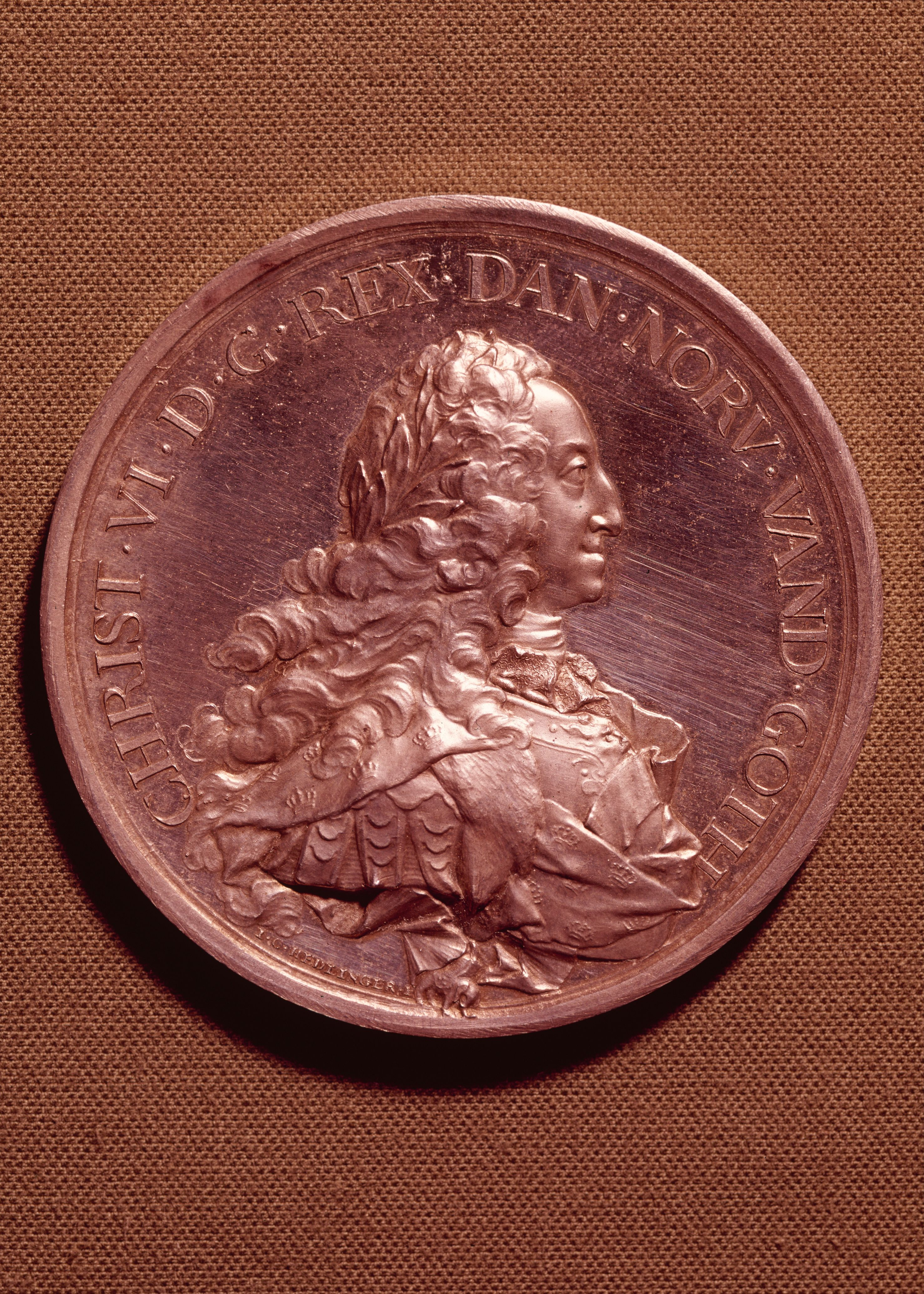
Medal commemorating Christian VI's expansion of the fleet.

- The Hermitage Hunting Lodge in Jægersborg Dyrehave is completed.
- North wing of house at Bregentved is constructed.
- Roskilde Royal Mansion is completed.
- The architects Lauritz de Thurah and Nicolai Eigtved are put in charge of designing the interior of the first Christiansborg Palace.
- A medal designed by Johann Carl Hedlinger is struck in commemoration of Christian VI's expansion of the royal naval fleet.

== Births ==
- 11 January – Christian Joseph Zuber, architect (died 1802)
- 24 January – Jacob Nicolai Wilse, priest and meteorologist (died 1801)
- 30 January – Johan Rudolph Thiele, book printer, company founder (died 1815)
- 21 July – Jean Abraham Grill, businessman (died 1792)
- 25 August – Frederik Georg Adeler, county official and landowner (died 1810)
- 16 September – Johannes Nikolaus Tetens, philosopher, statesman and scientist (died 1807)

Full date missing

- Henrich Brandemann, architect (died 1803)
- Johann Clemens Tode, physician (died 1807)
- Helferich Peter Sturz, Postmaster-General (died 1779)

== Deaths ==
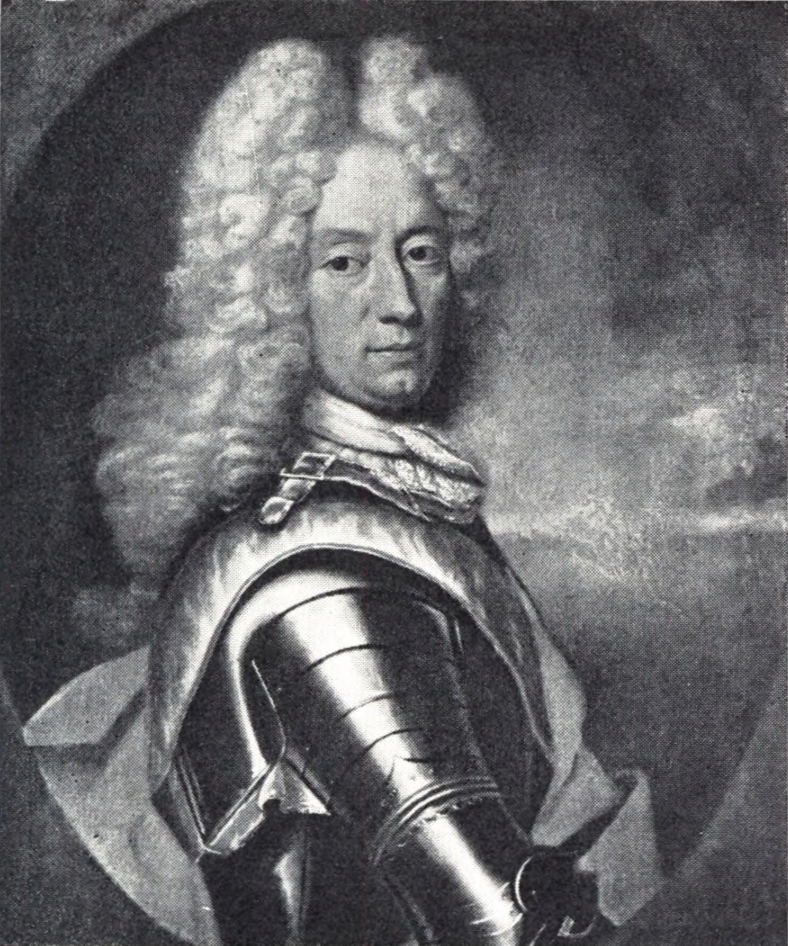
Christen Thomesen Sehested,

- 23 January – Adam Christopher Knuth, 1st Count of Knuthenborg (born 1687)
- 13 September – Christen Thomesen Sehested, admiral (born 1664)
- 27 September – Karen Brahe, book collector (born 1657)
- 31 October – Patroclus Rømeling, army officer (born 1662)
