= 1658 in Denmark =

- Decades: 1630s; 1640s; 1650s; 1660s; 1670s
- See also: Other events of 1658; List of years in Denmark

Events from the year 1658 in Denmark.

== Incumbents ==
- Monarch – Frederick III
- Steward of the Realm – Joachim Gersdorff

== Events ==
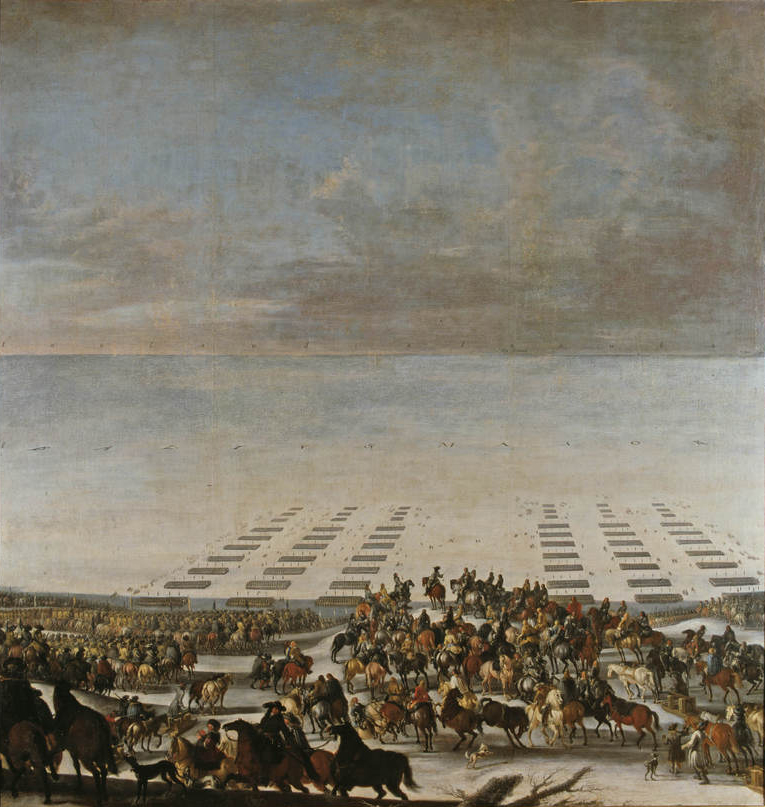
Swedish crossing of the Great Belt on 5 February

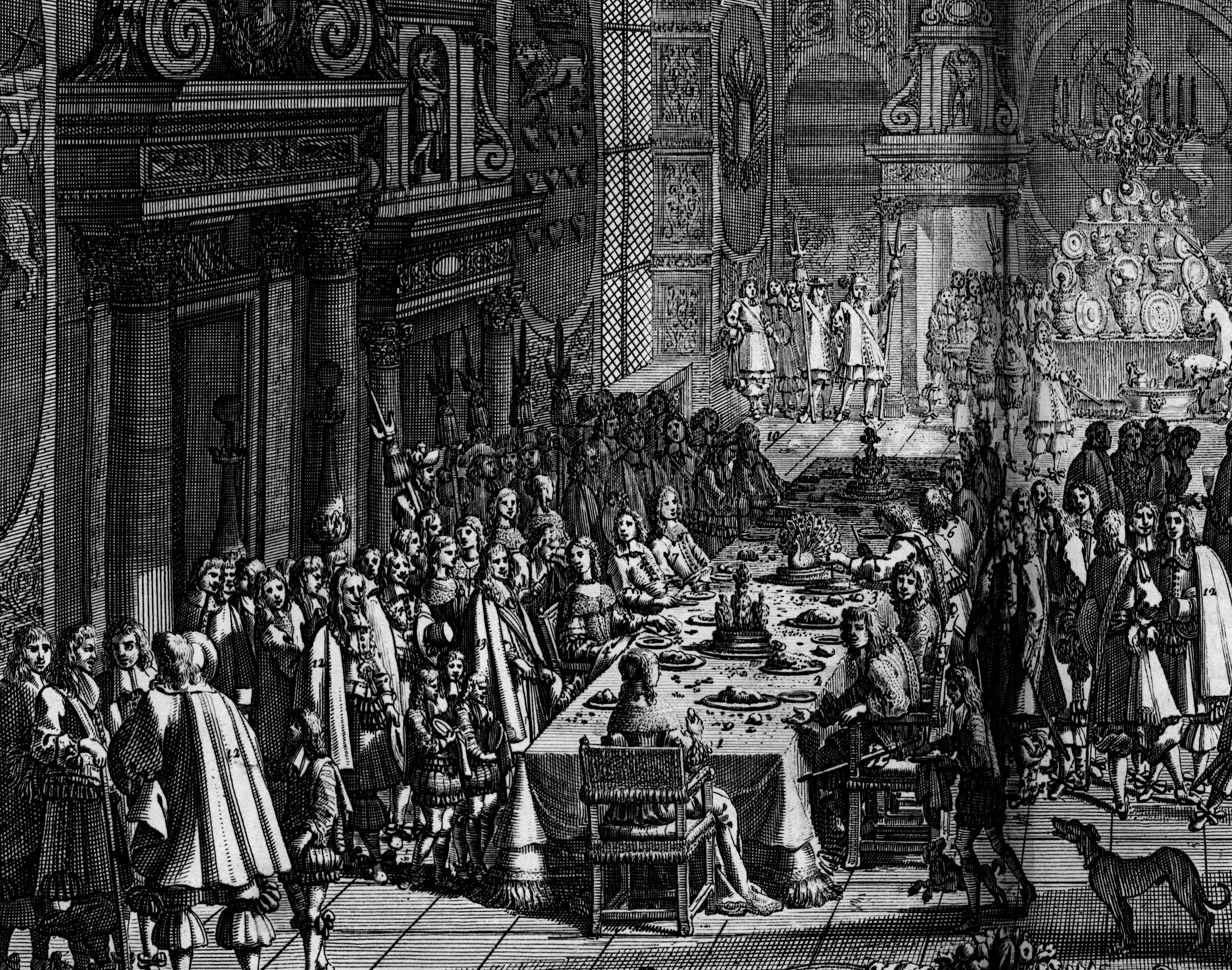
The peace banquet at Frederiksborg Castle following the signing of the Treaty of Roskilde on 26 February

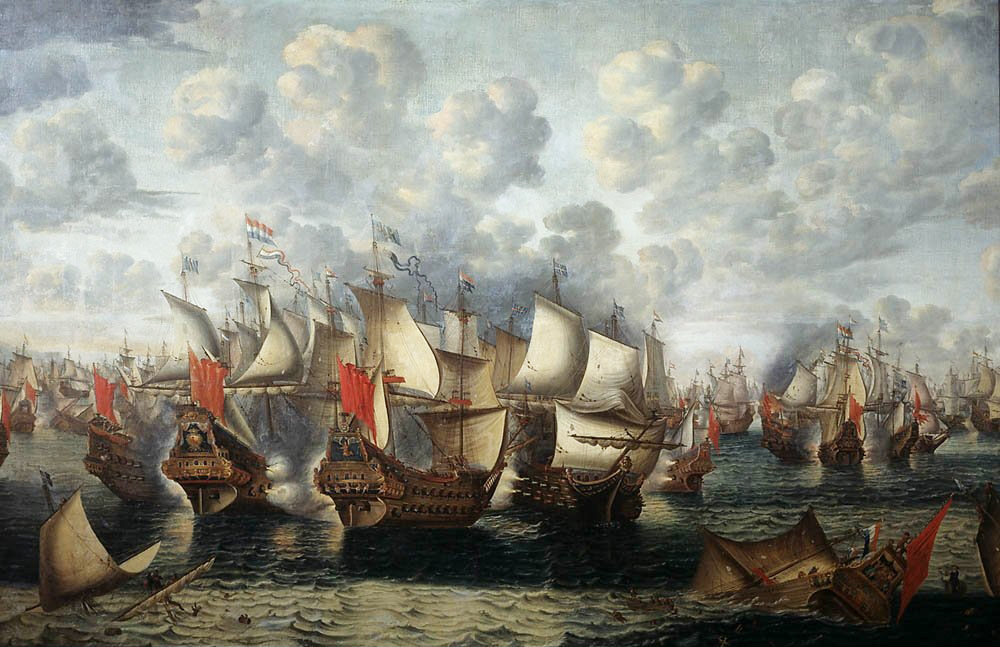
Battle of the Sound ion 29 October

January

- 30 January – The March across the Belts begins when the harsh winter weather, which has also forced the Danish fleet to port, enables a Swedish army of 9,000 cavalrymen and 3,000 foot soldiers to move across the ice of Little Belt from Jutland to Gunen.

February

- 5 February – The Swedish King and cavalry cross the Great Belt from Langeland to Lolland and the infantry and the artillery follow the next day.
- 8 February – The Swedish host reaches Zealand.
- 11 February – Having not expected a Swedish offensive until spring at the earliest, Denmark panics and yields. The Treaty of Taastrup is signed as a preliminary accord and negotiations continue.
- 26 February
  - The negotiations are finalized with the signing of the Treaty of Roskilde in Roskilde. It cedes Scania, Halland, Blekinge and Bornholm as well as two provinces in Norway to Sweden. Even after the treaty enters into force, the Swedish forces continue their campaign.
  - After the signing of the treaty, the Danish king hosts a peace banquet (Danish: Fredstaffelet) at Frederiksborg Castle.

June

- 9 June – In a letter to the king, citizens of Copenhagen make a demand for special privileges and a City Council of 32 men.

August

- 30 August – The Royal Life Guards on foot is founded.
- 10 August – As Swedish troops approach Copenhagen once again, the king, in a letter, promises that Copenhagen and Christianshavn will be free rigsstæder and heard on all matters of national importance, particularly those relating to customs and octroi.
- 11 August – The Swedish army resumes its siege of Copenhagen.
- 29 October – In the Battle of the Sound, a Dutch fleet come in support of Denmark which forces the Swedish fleet to end the blockade of Copenhagen. Soon after, Sweden has to abandon the siege of the city and withdraw from the Danish isles while they remain present in Jutland.

December

- 8–9 December – The Bornholm uprising: Resistance fighters on Bornholm try to capture the Swedish commander on the island, Redigerer Printzenskiöld, who is killed in the subsequent uproar.
- 25 December – The Battle of Kolding results in Danish-Polish victory against Sweden.

=== Undated ===
- Ulstrup Castle is completed.

== Deaths ==
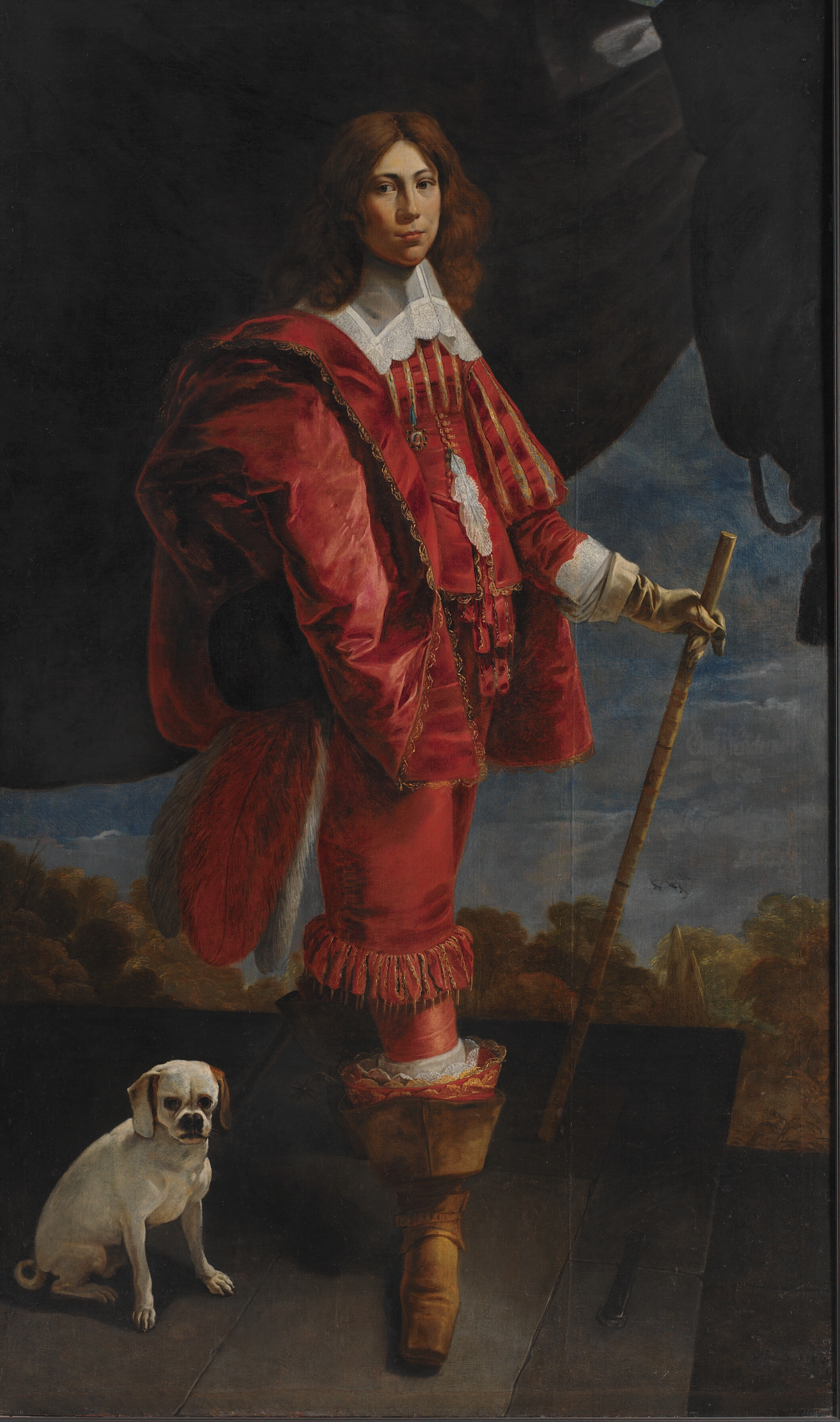
Ulrik Christian Gyldenløve.

- 17 February – Iver Vind, statesman, diplomat and landowner (born 1590)
- 19 April – Kirsten Munk, noble, royal spouse (born 1598)
- 22 July – Frederick, Duke of Schleswig-Holstein-Sønderburg-Norburg (born 1581)
- 11 December – Ulrik Christian Gyldenløve, commander-in-chief of the Danish army (born 1630)
