= 1660 in Denmark =

- Decades: 1640s; 1650s; 1660s; 1670s; 1680s
- See also: Other events of 1660; List of years in Denmark

Events from the year 1660 in Denmark.

== Incumbents ==
- Monarch – Frederick III
- Steward of the Realm – Joachim Gersdorff (until October, office disbanded)

== Events ==
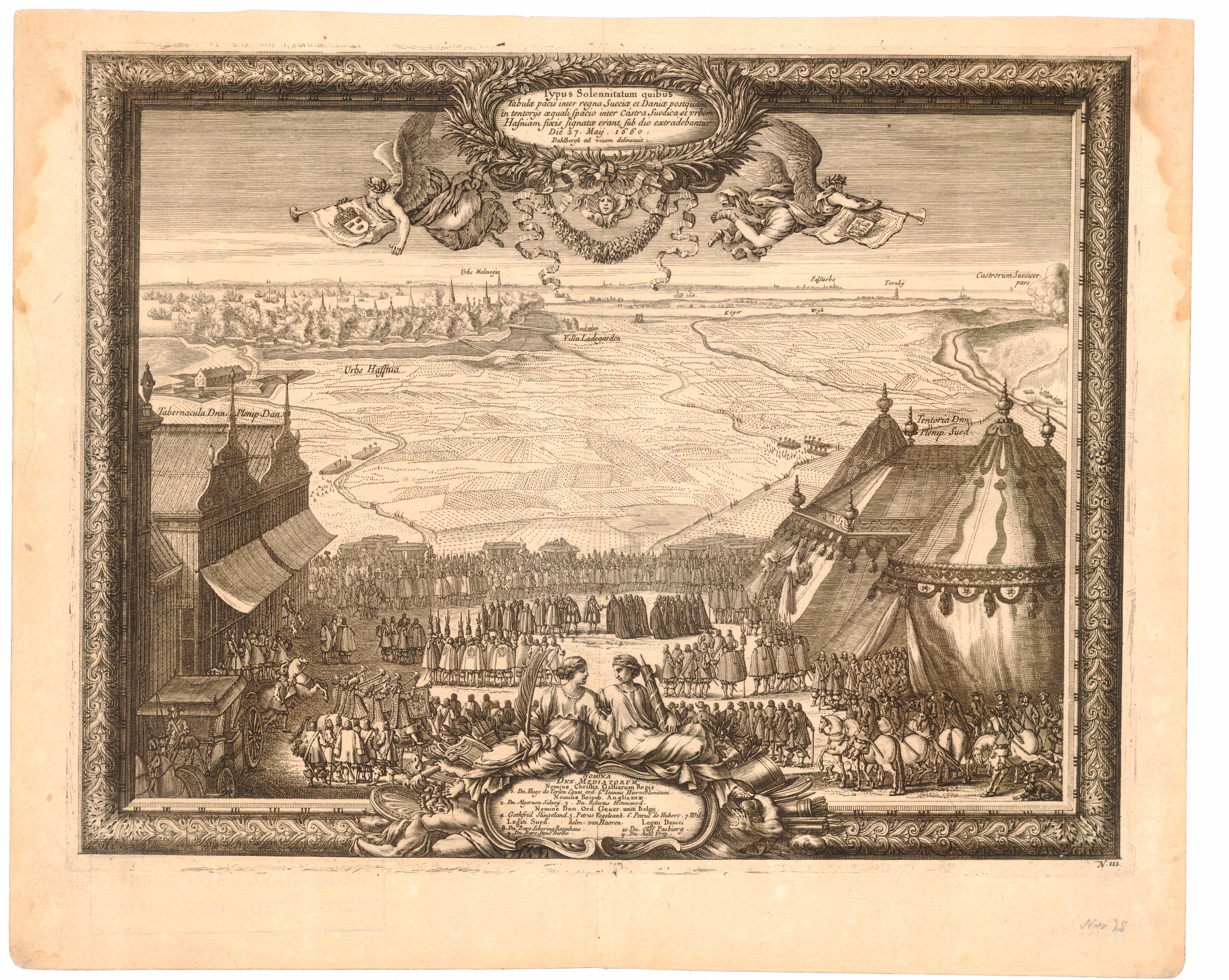
Danish and Swedish peace negotiators, 1660.

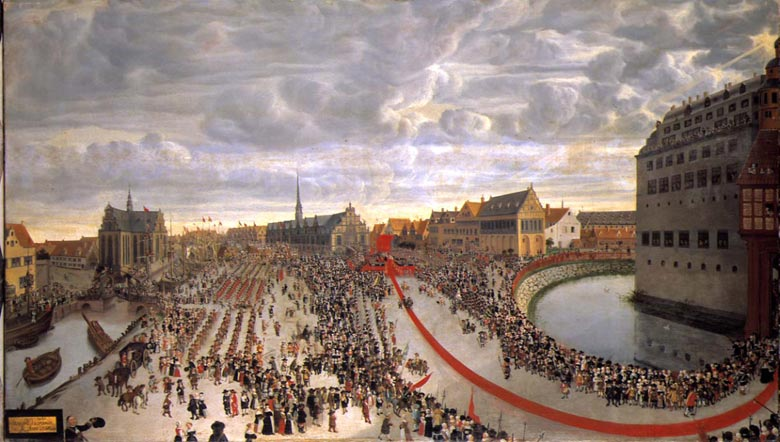
Paying Homage to the Hereditary King in Front of Copenhagen Castle, 18 October 1660 Wolfgang Heimbach, (1666)

- 27 May – The Treaty of Copenhagen is signed, marking the conclusion of the Second Northern War.
- 31 May – The Swedish troops depart from their camps outside Copenhagen.
- 11 July – The city gates of Copenhagen re-opens and trade returns to normal.
- 10 September – The estates gather at Copenhagen Castle to solve the financial problems faced after the wars and Frederick plays the different estates against each other.
- 10 October – The 1660 Danish state of emergency is declared by the king with the purpose of putting pressure on the nobility, a move which proves successful.
- 13 October – Bishop Hans Svane publicly offers the Heraldry Kingdom to the annulment of the Håndfæstning, and the institution of absolute monarchy is instituted by decree.
- 14 October – A Constituent Commission set up by the king meets for the first time to embark on the task of drawing up a new constitution but unable to agree it simply decides to cancel the existing Håndfæstning and leave it to the king to write the new constitution.
- 17 October – Extensive celebrations pay homage to the new Heraldry King.
- 4 November – The Chancellery and the "Geheime-statsrådet" are established.

== Deaths ==
- 5 June – Anne Holck, noblewoman (born 1602)
- 19 December – Ove Gjedde, admiral (born 1594)
