= 1663 in Denmark =

- Decades: 1640s; 1650s; 1660s; 1670s; 1680s
- See also: Other events of 1663; List of years in Denmark

Events from the year 1663 in Denmark.

== Incumbents ==
- Monarch – Frederick III

== Events ==
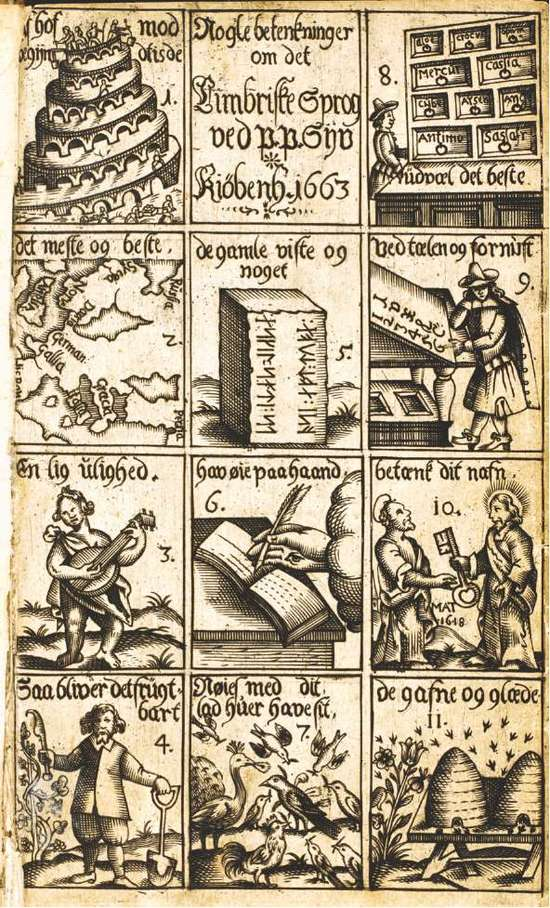
Nogle Betenkninger om det Cimbriske Sprog (1663)

- April 20 – The Danish seizure of Fort Christiansborg and Carlsborg (Cape Castle) completes the annexation of the Swedish Gold Coast settlements, the beginning of the Danish Gold Coast.

=== Undated ===
- Peder Syv publishes Nogle Betenkninger om det Cimbriske Sprog .

== Publications ==
- Thomas Bartholin: De pulmonum substantia et motu. Copenhagen, 1663.

== Births ==
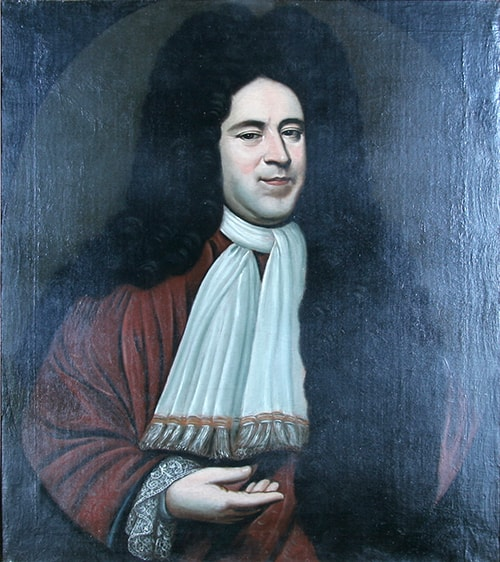
Johan Bertram Ernst.

- 15 July – Knud Reedtz, naval officer (died 1734)
- 30 October 1663 – Johan Bertram Ernst, chief of police in Copenhagen (died 1722)

== Deaths ==
- 13 January – Esaias Fleischer, pharmacist (born c. 1586)
- 27 September
  - Philip, Duke of Schleswig-Holstein-Sonderburg-Glücksburg (born 1584)
  - Christoffer Urne, statesman and landholder (died 1593)
