= 1738 in Denmark =

- Decades: 1710s; 1720s; 1730s; 1740s; 1750s
- See also: Other events of 1738; List of years in Denmark

Events from the year 1738 in Denmark.

== Incumbents ==
- Monarch – Christian VI
- Prime minister – Johan Ludvig Holstein-Ledreborg

== Births ==
- 7 September – Enevold Brandt - Danish courtier (d. 1772)

== Deaths ==
- 11 June - Caspar Bartholin the Younger, anatomist (born 1655)
- 18 November – Hendrick Krock, painter to the Danish Court (born 1671)

=== Full date unknown ===
- March - Margrethe Lasson, (first ever Danish) novelist (born 1659)
