= Hans van Steenwinckel the Younger =

Flemish-Danish architect

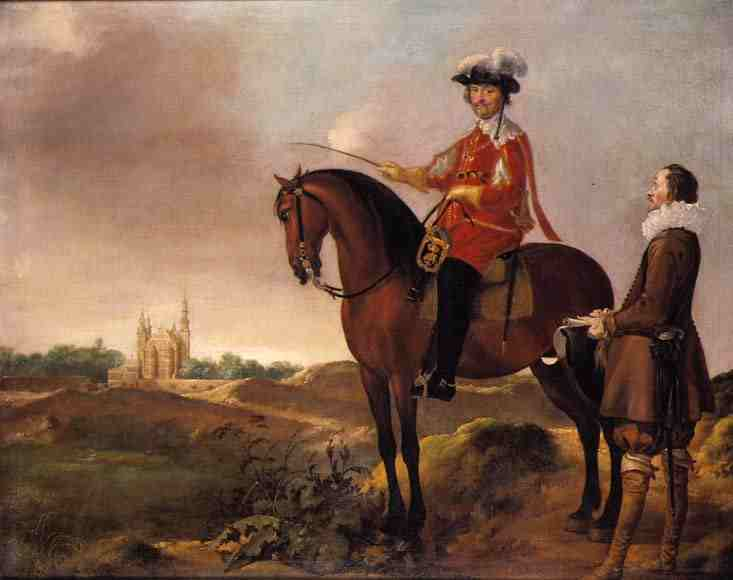
- Hans van Steenwinckel the Younger (right) with Christian IV on horse (1638)
- Born: 24 June 1587; Copenhagen, Denmark
- Died: 6 August 1639 (aged 52)
- Occupation: Architect
- Buildings: Christian IV's Stock Exchange; Rosenborg Castle; Frederiksborg Palace; Kronborg Castle; Round Tower

Hans van Steenwinckel the Younger (24 June 1587 – 6 August 1639) was a Flemish-Danish architect who specialised in the Dutch Renaissance style, typical of prestigious Danish buildings from the first half of the 17th century. Along with his brother Lorenz van Steenwinckel he was responsible for most of King Christian IV's many ambitious building projects.

He was the son of Hans van Steenwinckel the Elder and the father of Hans van Steenwinckel the Youngest and probably also the building master and engineer Oluf van Steenwinckel.

== Career ==
Hans and Lorenz van Steenwinckel were sons of the prime contractor and stonecutter Hans van Steenwinckel the Elder who was originally from Antwerp but had come to Denmark in 1576 to work on Kronborg Castle and subsequently became the preferred architect of Frederick II. It was natural that he followed in his father's footsteps and together with his brother Lorenz he went to the Netherlands to study architecture and stone carving.

Back in Denmark, Hans and Lorenz van Steenwinckel would become involved in most of Christian IV's numerous huge building projects in the first decades of the 17th century, though it is often not clear exactly what their share was. Often many people have participated in the design of a building, both because of the extensive construction times from initial plans to completed building which was common at that time. In the same time large prestige buildings were far from static entities, rather it was normal for them to see numerous extensions and reconstructions, developing gradually over the years. The enthusiastic king Christian IV himself is also known to have taken active part in the design of his many large buildings. To make matters even less clear, it was a strategy of Christian IV, and possibly his advisors, to keep the authorship of a building hidden to suggest that king himself was the author.

In the beginning of his career, Hans van Steenwinckel worked mainly as a sculptor, executing works both for Kronborg Castle and Frederiksborg Palace. He is credited for the octagonal tower at Rosenborg Castle.

After Lorenz' death in 1619, Hans was appointed new Royal Master Builder, and took over ongoing projects, such as Christian IV's Chapel at Roskilde Cathedral, under development since 1613, and the newly commenced Stock Exchange in Copenhagen.

With the Trinitatis Complex, which includes the Round Tower and Trinitatis Church, he turned to the new Dutch Baroque style, abandoning the Dutch Renaissance style which had until then been synonymous with his name. It was not completed until after his death.

== Selected works ==
Hans van Steenwinckel the Younger's contributions included:

- Rosenborg Castle - the octagonal tower (1616)
- Christian IV's Chapel, Roskilde Cathedral - after Lorenz' death in 1619 (1613–41)
- Christian IV's Stock Exchange - after Lorenz's death (1619–23)
- Frederiksborg Palace
- Valdemars Castle - first castle (1631–39)
- Nyboder - First, one-storied stage (1631–41)
- Kronborg Castle - rebuilding after the castle burned down in 1629 (1637)
- The Round Tower - completed after his death (1637–42)
- Trinitatis Church - completed after his death (1637–57)

== See also ==
- Hans van Steenwinckel the Elder
