= 1590s in Denmark =

Events from the 1590s in Denmark.

== Incumbents ==
- Monarch – Christian IV
- Steward of the Realm – Christoffer Valkendorff (from 1596)

== Events ==
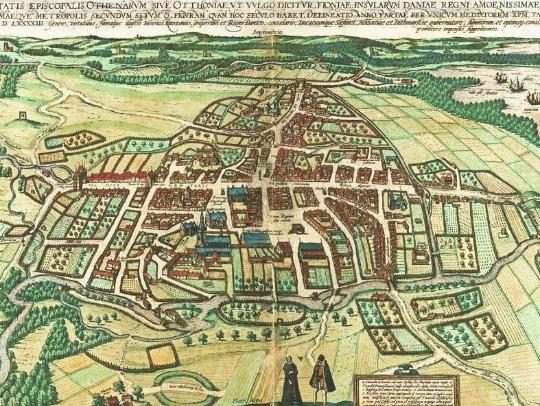
Braniuss' topographical image of Odense from 1593

1591

- 4 July – Christopher Perkins has his first audience with Christian IV after his appointment as British ambassador to Denmark
- Katholm Castle is completed on the Djursland peninsula.

1592

- 23 May – Mariager is incorporated as a market town.

1593

- 7 July – da:kørgen Vind, Admiral of the Realm (died 1744)
- Arngrímur Jónsson publishes Brevis commentarius de Islandia, a Brief Commentary on Iceland

1594

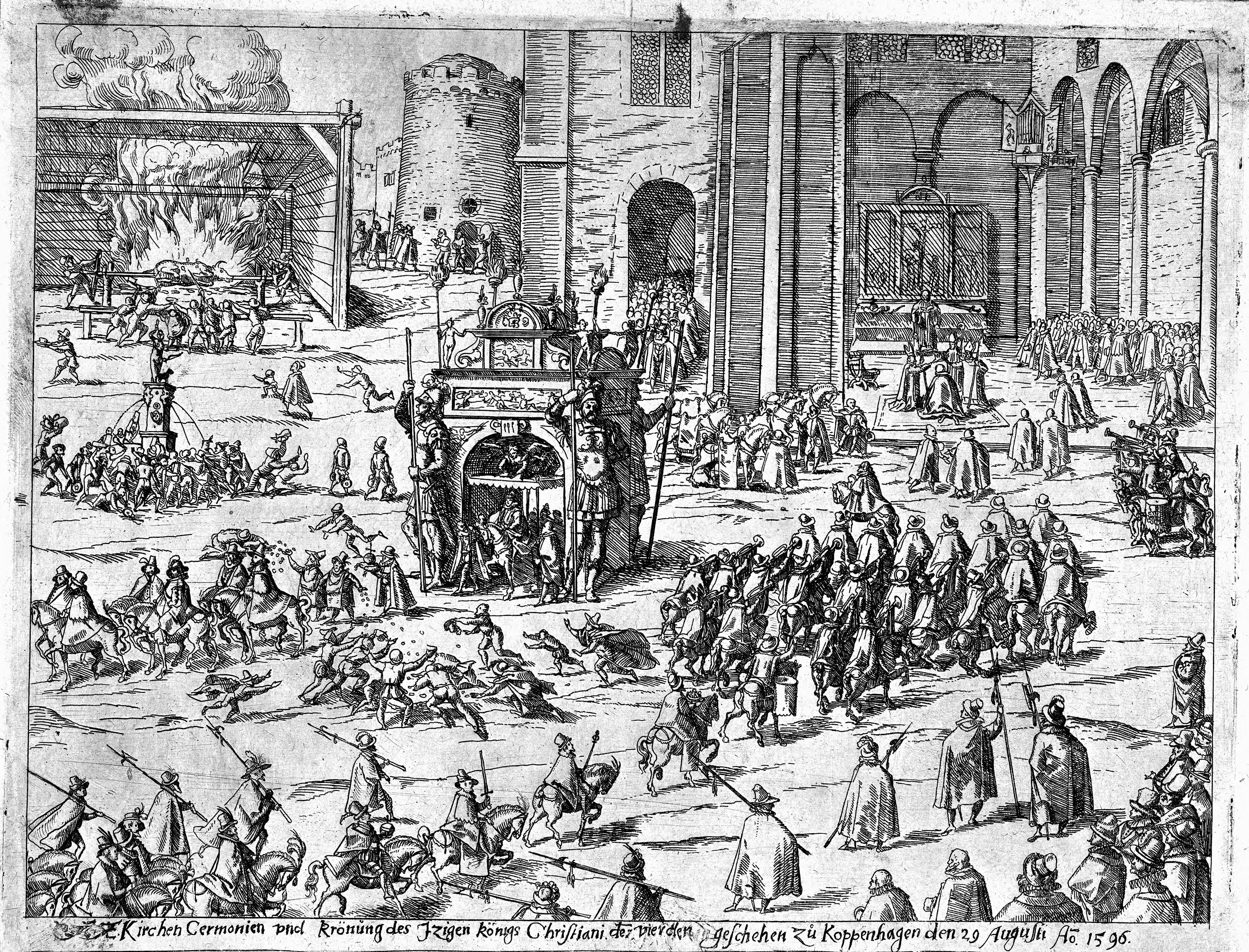
26 August 1596: Kirchen Cermonien und Krönung des Zwigen Königs Christiani des Vierden geschehen zu Koppenhagen den 29 Augusti Ao. 1596.jpg.

- Giacomo Castelvetro visits Denmark

1596

- 26 August – The coronation of Christian IV of Denmark.

1597

- 27 November – The wedding of Christian IV and Anne Catherine of Brandenburg takes places at Haderslevhus, making Anne Catherine queen consort of Denmark.

== Births ==
1590

- 11 June 1590
  - Oluf Parsberg, pricy councillor and landowner (died 1661)
  - Iver Vind, statesman, diplomat and landowner (died 1658)

1593

- 27 October 1593 – Christoffer Urne, statesman and landholder (died 1663)
- 12 January 1594 – Gregers Krabbe, Governor-general of Norway (died 1655)

1594

- 29 December 1594 – Ove Gjedde, admiral (died 1660)
- 30 April 1595 – Anne Lykke, noble (died 1641)
- 13 November 1596 – Malte Sehested, military officer and landowner (died 1771)

1598

- 6 July 1598 – Kirsten Munk, royal spouse (died 1658)
- 17 October 1598 – Jørgen Knudsen Urne, statesman (died 1642)
- 28 November 1598 – Ulrik of Denmark (1578–1624), statesman (died 1667)

1599

- 18 April 1599 – Heinrich Holk, mercenary (died 1633)
- 23 July 1599 – Stephanius, royal historiographer and professor (died 1650)
- 2 August – Ludvig Munthe, bishop (died 1649 in Norway)
- 20 December 1599 – Niels Trolle, Governor-general of Norway (died 1667)

Unknown date

- c. 1590 – Hans Brachrogge, singer and composer (died c. 1638)

== Deaths ==
- 1590 – Karen Kotte, merchant
- 21 September 1592 – Povel Huitfeldt, governor (born c. 1520)
- 8 October 1593 – Jacob Ulfeldt, diplomat and privy councillor (born 1535)
- 29 June 1584 – Niels Kaas, statesman (born 1535)
- 1584 – Erik Munk, officer and administrator
