= Isgård =

Manor house in Syddjurs Municipality, Denmark

Isgård Manor House
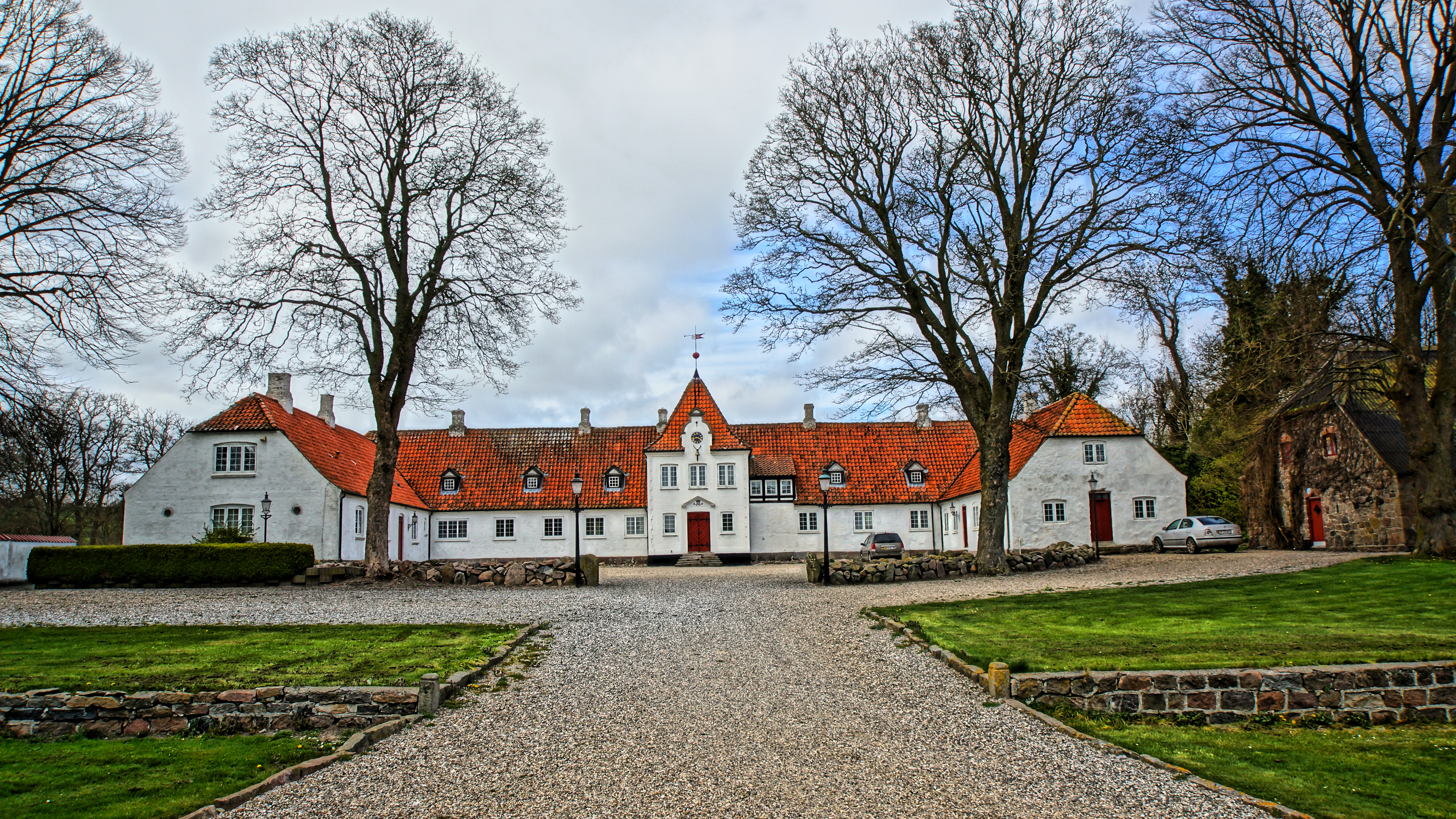
- Isgård in Denmark

- Location within Denmark
- Former names: Eg

General information
- Location: Isgårdsvej 7, 8420 Knebel, Denmark
- Coordinates: 56.18°N 10.42°E
- Construction started: 1100s
- Completed: Main building from 1890

Isgård is a Danish manor house and farm close to the sea on the hilly southern part of the peninsula Djursland in the Kattegat Sea between Denmark and Sweden at the entrance to the Baltic Sea in Northern Europe. Isgård is located on the Tved peninsula flanking the east coast of Århus Bugt (Århus Bay) to the west and Begtrup Vig (Begtrup Bay) to the east. Isgård lies 10 kilometers from the city Århus in a straight line across Århus Bugt, but 47 kilometers by road around the bay.

As of 2011 Isgård includes 263 hectares of land. There are modern pig farm buildings with a registered production capacity of 12.000 piglets weighing 7 to 30 kilos per year. These buildings are located out of sight of the main buildings, but are visible from the southern sea front in Begtrup Vig. The oldest of Isgård's buildings are about 300 years old dating back to the 1700s.

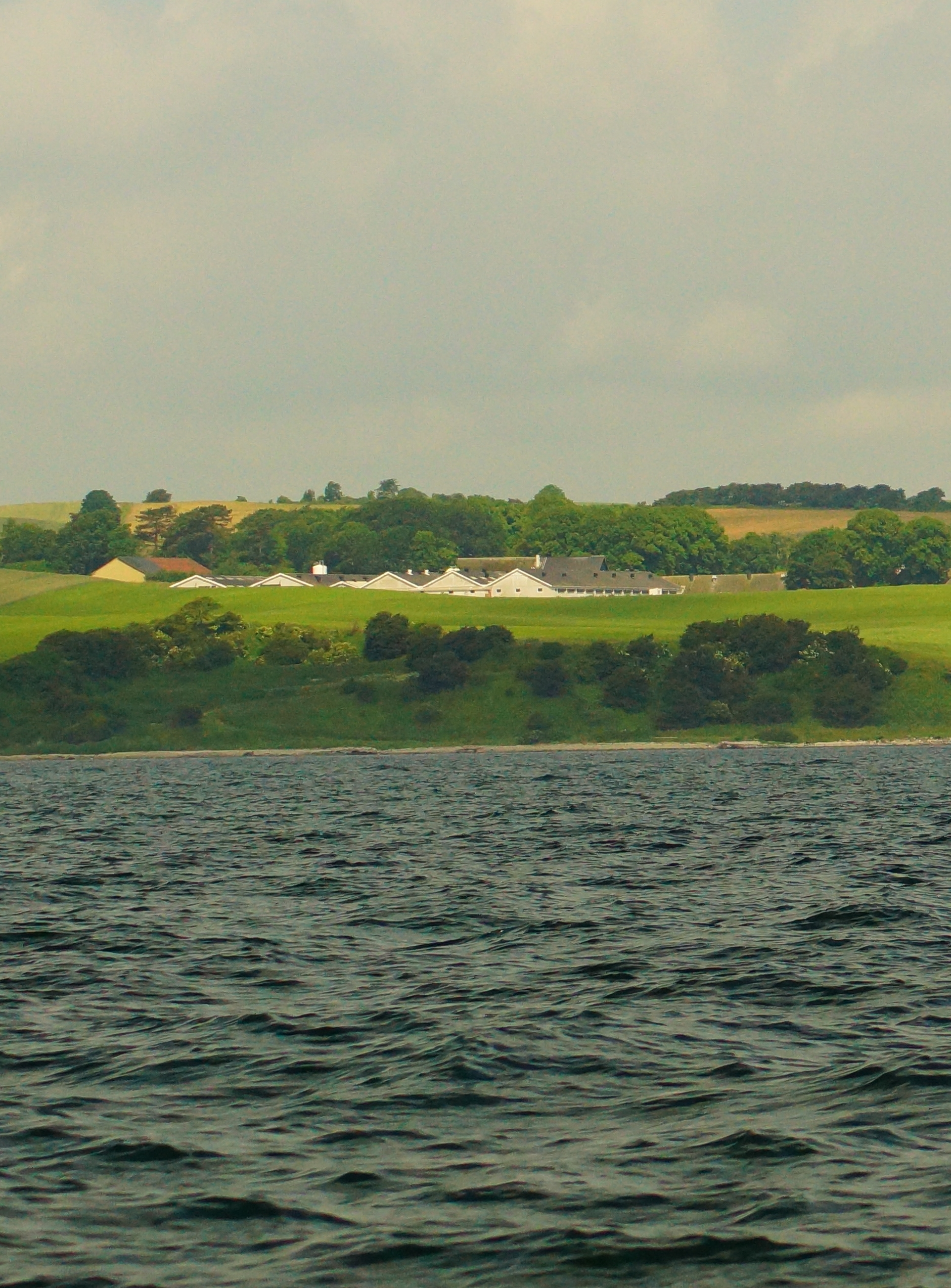
Isgård viewed from Begtrup Vig (Begtrup Bay) with newer farm buildings specialized for breeding piglets in the foreground

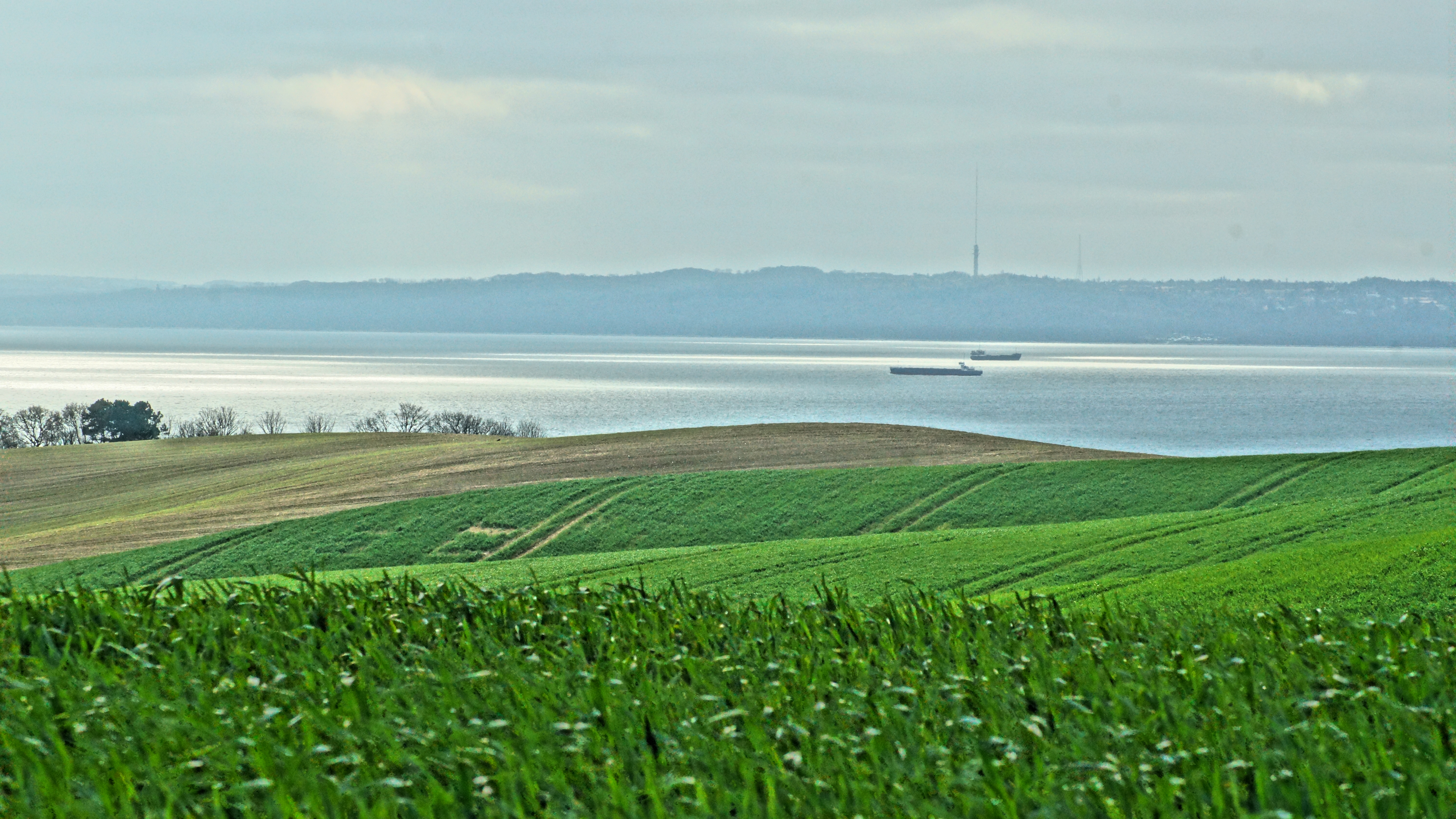
View from the hills above Isgård over Århus Bay towards the west in direction of mainland Jutland and the southern outskirts of Århus

The small public country road leading to Isgård, Isgårdsvej, runs through the main yard continuing under a narrow archway through one of the old farm buildings, turning up a hill as an unpaved road to Landborup. Here the road passes a viewpoint 80 meters above sea level. From this spot there is a view of many of southern Djursland's bays, as well as 10 kilometers across Århus Bugt to mainland Jutland with the seaport of Århus clearly seen. Århus is Denmark's second largest city lying south of the peninsula, Djursland, where Isgård is located on the southern part. In his 2022 book Tolkien og det mytiske Jylland (Danish: Tolkien and the mythical Jutland), historian Casper Clemmensen suggests that Isgård inspired J. R. R. Tolkien in his development of the fortress Isengard in The Lord of the Rings.

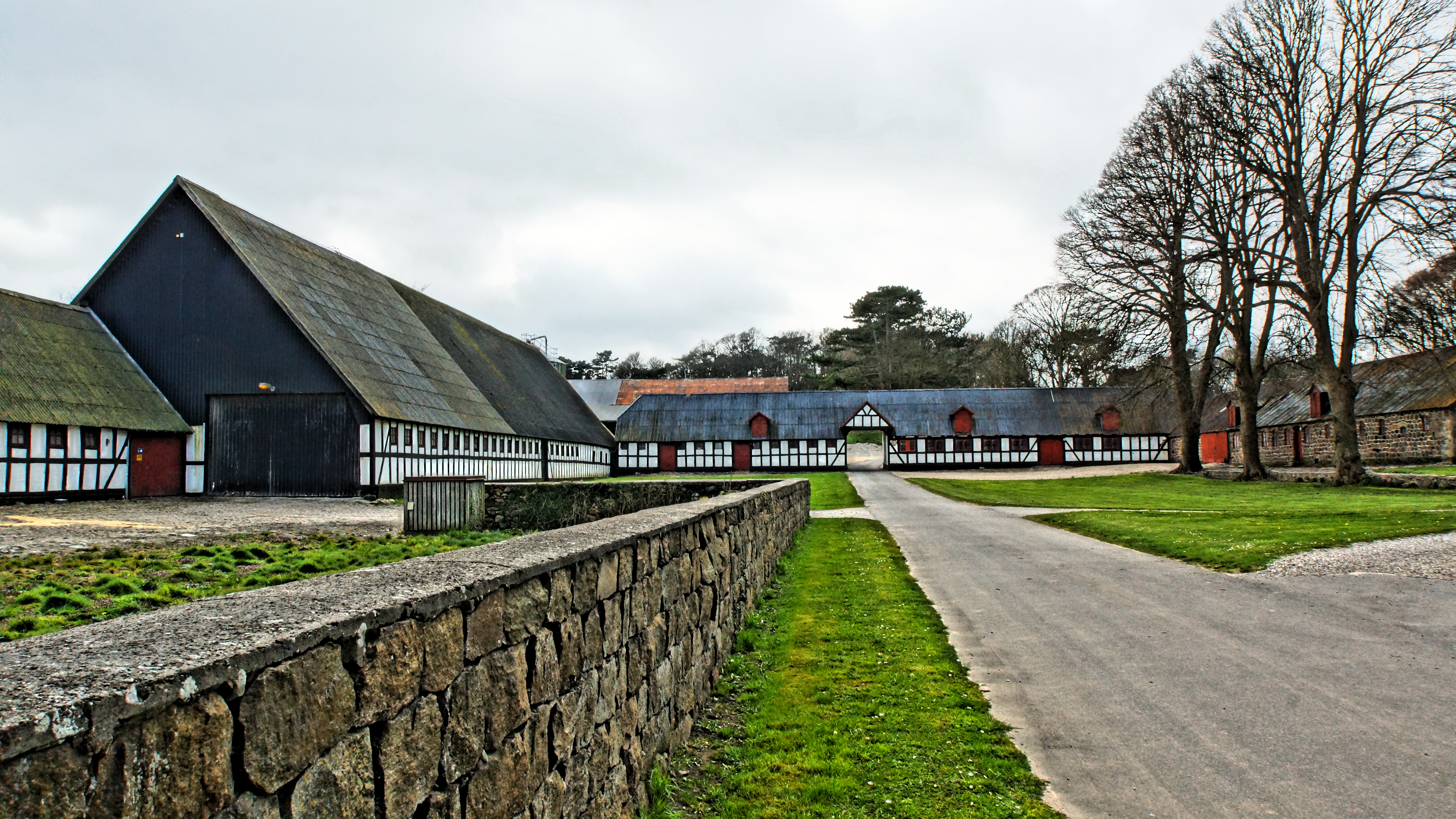
The public road to Isgård goes through the main yard continuing through one of the farm buildings via an archway.

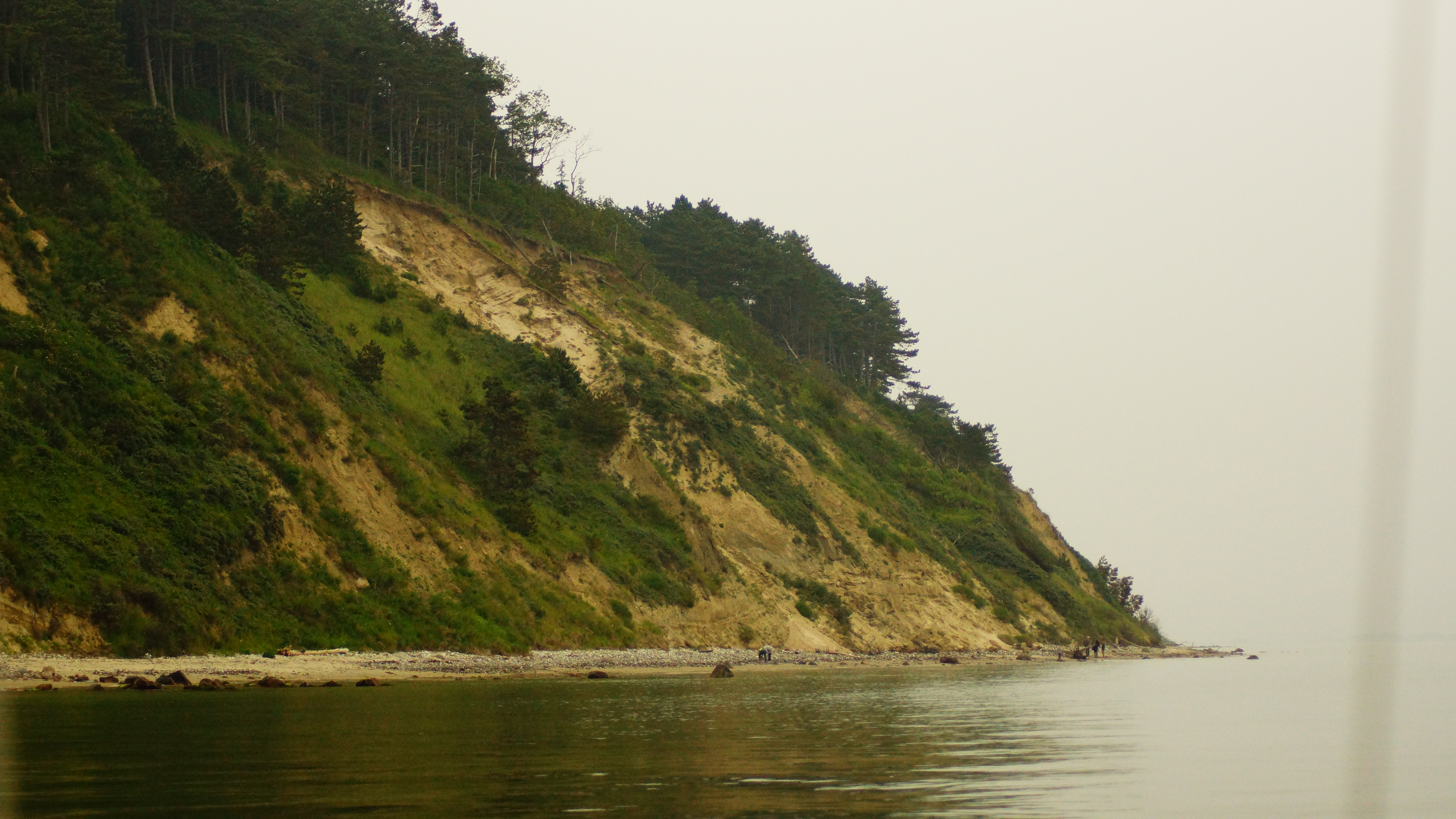
Steep slopes with coastal erosion by Isgård. For scale click the picture to see the people on the beach on the right side.

== Owners ==
In the Middle Ages Isgård was called Eg (Oak). A nearby village still bears this name today. Isgård has been owned by bishop Skjalm Vognsen, who was one of the builders of Århus Cathedral in the 1100s and 1200s. From the hills up from Isgård, the cathedral in Århus, with its 96 meter high tower, could clearly be seen in olden days. Today the built up harbor area partly obscures the view to the cathedral.

When the Reformation came to Denmark around 1536, with the shift from Catholicism to Protestant Lutheranism, church belongings were confiscated by the king, including Isgård, that was part of Århus Cathedral's estate.

Eight years later, in 1544, the king sold Isgård to a neighboring squire in the area, High Court judge, Anders Christiernsen Sandberg of Quelstrup.

In the early 1600s Isgård-owner Joachim Gersdorff bought three other estates around Århus Bugt including Rolsøgård, Vosnæsgård and Quelstrup. In the late 1700s this conglomerate was split up again.

Through the 1800s Isgård often changed owners. In 1890 the existing main building was built by court squire Just Henrik Krieger, and his wife, baroness Ellen Gyldenstjerne.

As of June 2016 Isgård is owned by Ole Danmark Knudsen.

== Surroundings ==
The coastline of Isgård to the south and the east consists of steep, often eroding, slopes down to the sea with a walkable beach, where the tidal difference is normally less than one foot. The hilly moraine deposits in the area are dominated by different types of clay with spots of sandy material in between.

Isgård's 3 kilometers of rarely visited scenic coastline is described as good for angling on various anglers' websites. Fish caught here include sea trout and flounders, plus, more seasonally, garfish and mackerel.

It takes some local knowledge to get down to this coast as an angler or hiker. One way is from Isgårdsvej east of Isgård between Isgård and the village E.g., turning south down an easily overlooked, unpaved forest road recognizable by a small information poster at the roadside. This leads to a public footpath going to the sea. All in all it is about one kilometer from Isgårdsvej. Via the path one can walk along the shoreline round Mols Hoved (Mols Head) including along Isgård's coastline towards the summer house settlement, Skødshoved Strand, and Hundshoved. In Denmark access to all coastlines is public, secured by law. From Skødshoved Strand there is also access to the coastline from the northwest. The walk between Skødshoved Strand around Mols Hoved along the coast is about 6 kilometers. One can also walk part of the way along the fields at the top of the coastal slopes giving a better view, but with problems as to going down the steep slopes, if one wants to walk along the shore part of the way.

From Isgård, one kilometer to the west, at the end of the partly gravel road, Molshovedvej, lies a minor summer house settlement in the hills next to Århus Bugt and close to the steep and largely impassable slope down to the sea. In this summer house area there is a stairway down the slope to the sea. Nonresident driving is prohibited on Molshovedvej as a way of access to the sea, but one is allowed to walk or ride a bike on the road. This is another way to reach the coastline down from Isgård.

823 hectares in the proximity of Isgård were protected in 1982, with the purpose of securing the nature assets of the hilly landscape and securing better public access to the area and the sea.
