= Jens Nielsen Kragh =

Danish West Indies colonial administrator (1729–1773)

Jens Nielsen Kragh (c. 1729 – 29 April 1773) was a Danish West Indies colonial administrator and plantation owner. He served as Commandant of St. Thomas and St. John.

== Biography ==
Kragh was born around 1729. By 1754, Kragh served as the Danish West India Company's chief trader (overkøbmand) on Saint Thomas. After the Danish colonies came under royal administration in 1755, he entered Crown service as a bookkeeper and warehouse manager. He left those posts that same year. Kragh later served as vice commandant and was appointed interim commandant of Saint Thomas and Saint John in 1767. He became commandant in 1770. In 1772, as his health declined, the civilian responsibilities associated with his position were transferred to his son-in-law, Georg Hjersing Høst. On 29 April 1773, Kragh, who was still Commandant, died in Saint Thomas. He was married to Elisabeth Hoffmann (née Esmith, 1711–1782). His son Augustus Kragh went on to own Mary Point Plantation in the late 18th century.
