= 1662 in Denmark =

- Decades: 1640s; 1650s; 1660s; 1670s; 1680s
- See also: Other events of 1662; List of years in Denmark

Events from the year 1662 in Denmark.

== Incumbents ==
- Monarch – Frederick III

== Events ==
- 19 February – A royal decree introduces the subdivision Amt as a replacement for the len subdivision.

=== Undated ===
- First Danish cadastral survey is completed over the summer.

== Births ==
- 22 June – Peter Rodsteen, government official and landowner (died 1714)
- 29 June – Frederik Vind, landowner and diocesan governor (died 1702)

== Deaths ==
- 8 April – Birgitte Thott, translator, writer and feminist (born 1610)
