= Johannes Moller (headmaster) =

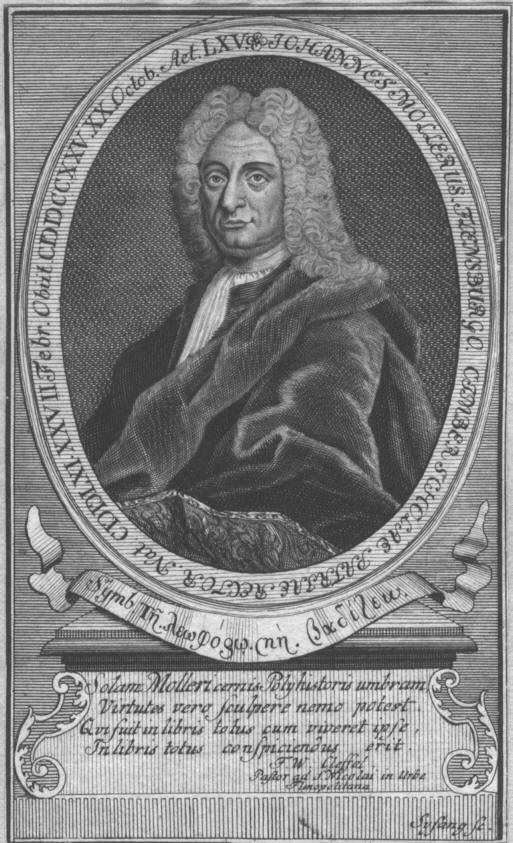
Johannes Moller

Johannes Moller (27 February 1661, Flensburg – 2 October 1725, Flensburg) was a Danish Pietist, headmaster of Flensburg's Latin School, and author of a noted biography of North German scholars „Cimbria literata".

He studied theology, philosophy and history at the Universities of Kiel and Leipzig, then continued his education by conducting research in libraries at Hamburg (1681–84) and Copenhagen (1684/65). From 1685 until his death in 1725, he was associated with the Flensburg school, eventually attaining the positions of conrector (1690) and rector (1701). In 1711 he founded the school library.

His most famous work, Cimbria literata, sive, Scriptorum ducatus utriusque Slesvicensis et Holsatici, was first published after his death by his son in three folio volumes (1744).

For the historian see Johannes Möller
