= Karen Kotte =

Danish merchant (died 1591)

- Died: 6 July 1591
- Occupation: Merchant
- Spouse: Claus Mikkelsen
- Children: 2

Karen Kotte (died 6 July 1591) was a Danish merchant, who helped fund the Danish crown with supplies during the Northern Seven Years' War.

== Life ==
Karen Kotte was born into one of the most prominent trading families in Odense. She was the daughter of the mayor of Odense, merchant Jørgen Nielsen Kotte (died 1584) and Kirsten Peder Christophersdatter (died 1583). She was married to merchant Claus Mikkelsen (died 1572). She had two daughters.

During the Northern Seven Years' War, she, along with Oluf Bager and Hans Mule, financed the Danish military with war goods on credit and as a result, fared much better than other merchants in the aftermath of the war.

In 1572, she hosted Ulrich, Duke of Mecklenburg and his retinue while they were travelling to his daughter, Sophie of Mecklenburg-Güstrow's wedding to Frederick II of Denmark. Kotte received the highest compensation from the duke among all the hosts of his trip. In comparison, Kotte's father received the second highest amount, which was only half of what Kotte received.

Kotte used her farm as a debtor's prison, where inmates stayed at their own expense and had to remain until their debt was paid off.

Kotte died on 6 July 1591. After her death, a dispute over inheritance arose between her son-in-law Christoffer Bang and her other heirs. He alleged that Kotte had prevented his wife and her daughter Kirstine from accessing her inheritance from her father. As well as that, the other heirs had borrowed money from Kotte and failed to repay it before her death. The king had to intervene repeatedly, ordering them to appear before a magistrate and either reconcile amicably or have the magistrate settle the dispute.
