= Georg Hjersing Høst =

Danish government official and writer

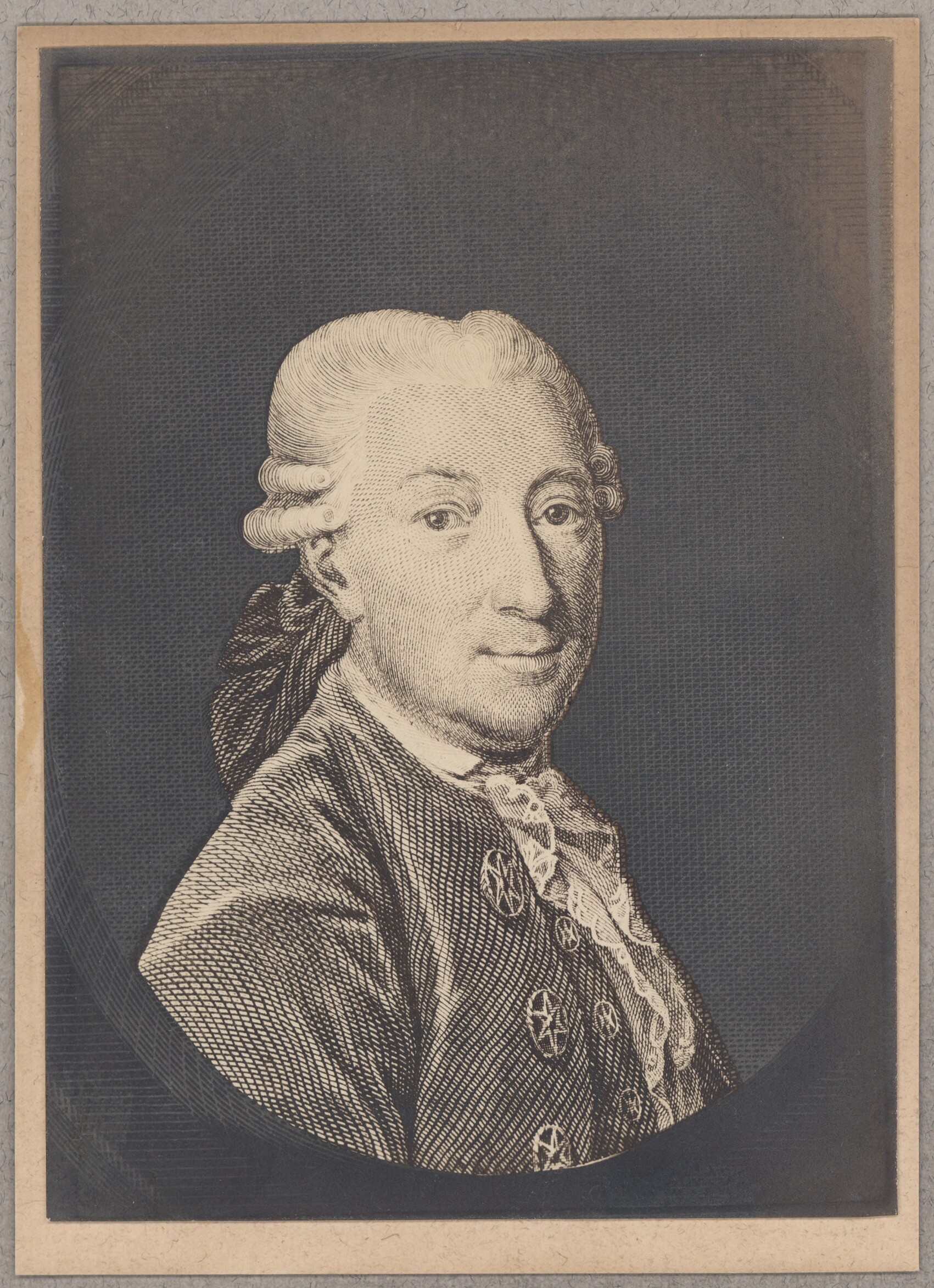
Georg Hjersing Høst

Georg Hjersing Høst (8 April 1734 – 22 April 1794) was a Danish government official and writer whose career took him both to Marocco and the Danish West Indies. His book Georg Hjersing Høst’s Account of the Island of St. Thomas and Its Governors Recorded there on the Island from 1769 until 1776 has been translated into English.

== Early life and education ==
Høst was born on 8 April 1734 in Vitten, the son of provost Christen Jensen Høst (1708–52) and Nille Hjersing (1713–59). His mother was, after his father's death in 1759, married to Lieutenant Gotfred Manniche (c. 1711–73). Høst matriculated from Aarhus Latin School in 1752. In 1755, he earned a Candidate of Theology degree from the University of Copenhagen.

== Career ==
In 1760, Høst was employed by the Danish African Company as an assistant in Morocco. He learned Arabic, was promoted and saw himself appointed as vice consul in Mogador. He returned to Denmark when the short-lived Danish Arica Company was dissolved.

In 1769, he was appointed to secretary and member of the Secretary Counsilor Saint Thomas in the Danish West Indies. In 1772, when his father-in-law Jens Nielsen Kragh became derelict, Høst took over the civilian part of his duties as commandant, although with an obligation to consult either Kragh or the governor-general in all important matters. He briefly served as interim commandant of Saint Thomas and Saint John following his father-in-law's death. In 1776, he resigned and returned to Denmark.

He was awarded the title of Kammerråd in 1770, Justitsråd in 1776 and Etatsråd in 1784. In 1780, Høst was appointed as secretary of the Department of Foreign Affairs in Copenhagen.

== Writings ==
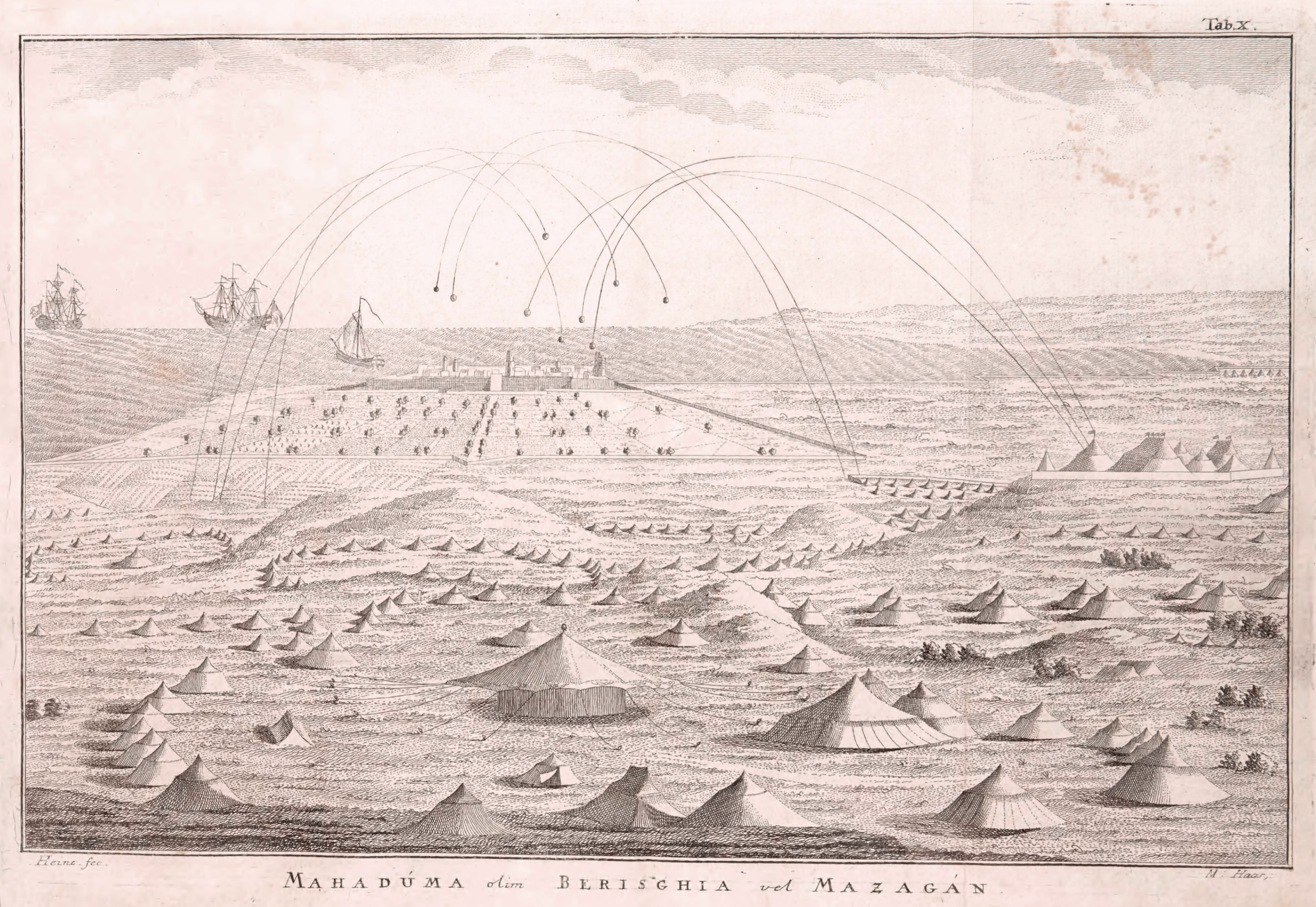
Illustration from Høst's Efterretninger om Marokos og Fes, samlede der i Landene fra 1760 til 1768

In 1779, instigated by Carsten Niebuhr, Jøst published Efterretninger om Marokos og Fes, samlede der i Landene fra 1760 til 1768. It was later translated into German and possibly French. The publication was followed by Den Marokanske Kajser Ben Abdallahs Historie (1791) and Efterretninger om Øen Sanct Thomas og dens Gouverneurer optegnede der paa Landet fra 1769 indtil 1776 (1791) The latter publication was published in an English-language translation by Arnold R. Highfield with assistance from Kristoffer F. Bøegh as Georg Hjersing Høst's Account of the Island of St. Thomas and Its Governors Recorded there on the Island from 1769 until 1776 in 2018.

== Personal life ==
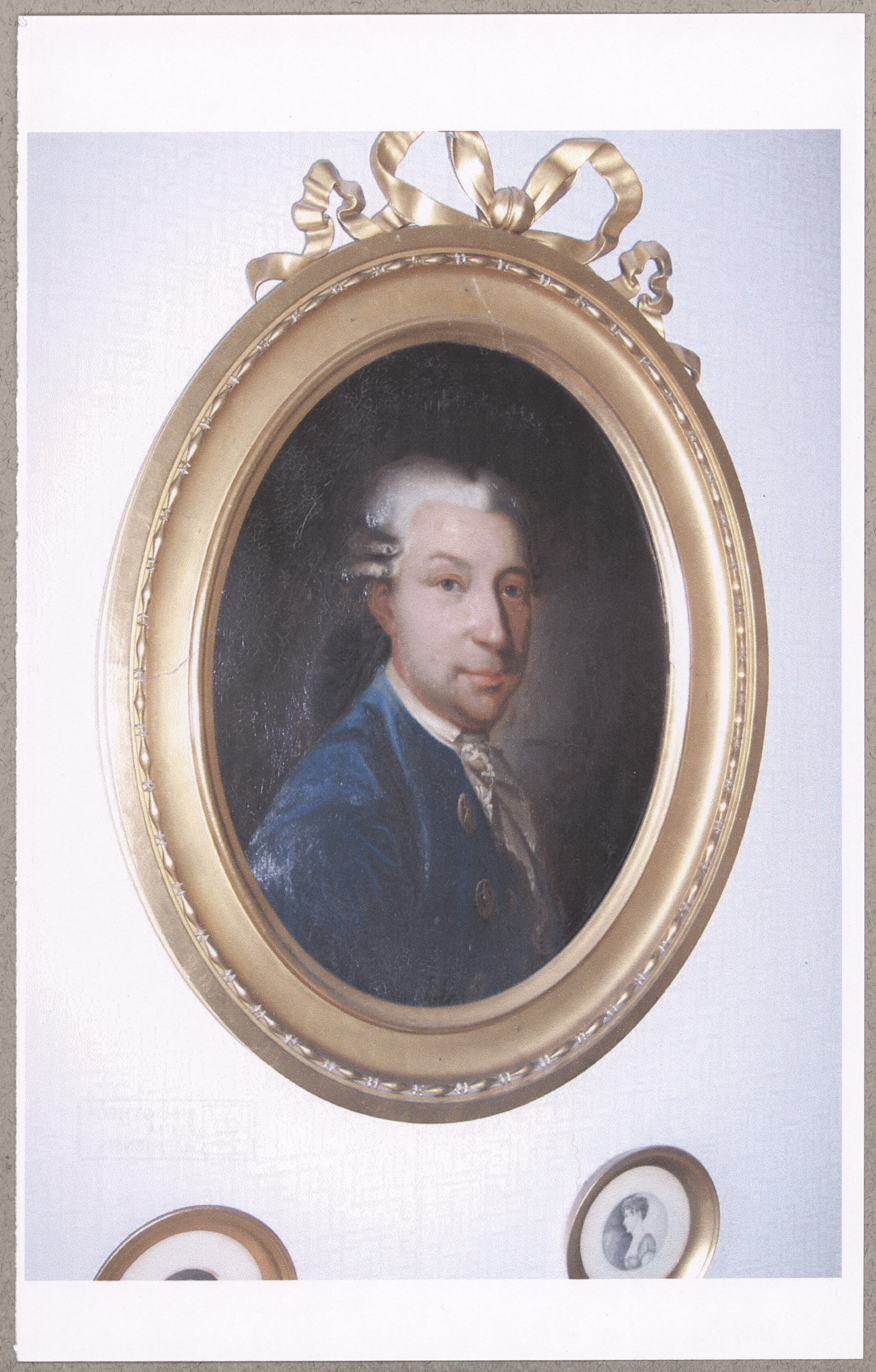
Georg Hjersing Høst

Høst married Birgitta Henrika Kragh (3 January 1754 – 28 January 1831) on 1 August 1771 on Saint Thomas. She was the daughter of commandant Jens Nielsen Kragh (c. 1729–73) and Elisabeth Hoffmann (née Esmith, 1711–82). They were the parents of the following children:

- Far til Jens Kragh Høst (1772–1844)m a writer and publisher
- Christen Georg Høst (1776–1825), customs inspector with title of justitsråd
- Johannes Nicolai Høst (1780–1854), surgeon, lawyer, and bookprinter
- Marcus Gerhard Høst (1782–1846), medical doctor
- Anna Birgitte Høst (1784–1867)
- Andreas Petrus Høst (1787–1829), birk judge on Fanø
- Elise Elisabeth Høst (1794–1851), married to businessman Andreas Frederik Beyer

Høst bought a large house at Ylfeldts Plads after his return to Copenhagen. The building faced the square, Kejsergade and Skindergade. He and his wife kept a large household with a busy social life. His granddaughter Sille Beyer has described the family in her memoirs Erondringer om slægterne Beyer og Høst (1862).
