= Oluf van Steenwinckel =

Danish engineer (died 1659)

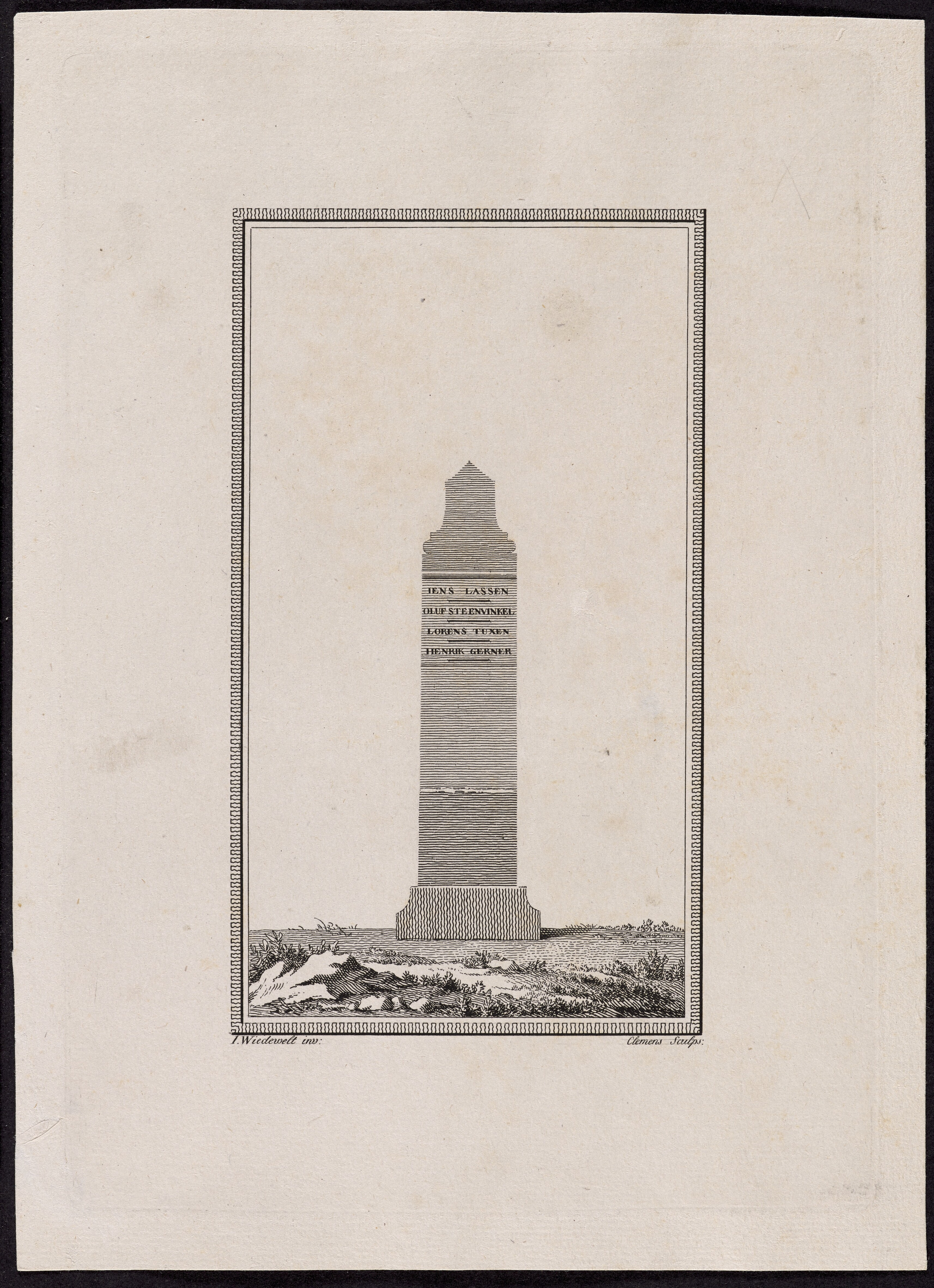
Monument in Jægersåris Memorial Park

Oluf van Steenwinckel (died 1659) was a Danish building master and engineer, probably the son of Hans van Steenwinckel the Younger.

== Biography ==
In the 1640s he worked at Nykøbing Castle among other places and from 1651 to 52 he was Copenhagen's first City Surveyor (Danish: Stadskonduktør), involved in the cedestral registration and parcelling of Frederick III's New Copenhagen. In June 1659, during the Northern Wars, he participated in a failed attempt to recapture Kronborg Castle and was executed by the Swedish.

== Legacy ==
A monument to Steenwinckel, Hans Lassen, Lorenz Tuxen and Henrik Gerner was later erected in the Jægersåris Memorial Park.

== See also ==
- Hans van Steenwinckel
