= Bramsløkke =

Manor house in Guldborgsund Municipality, Denmark

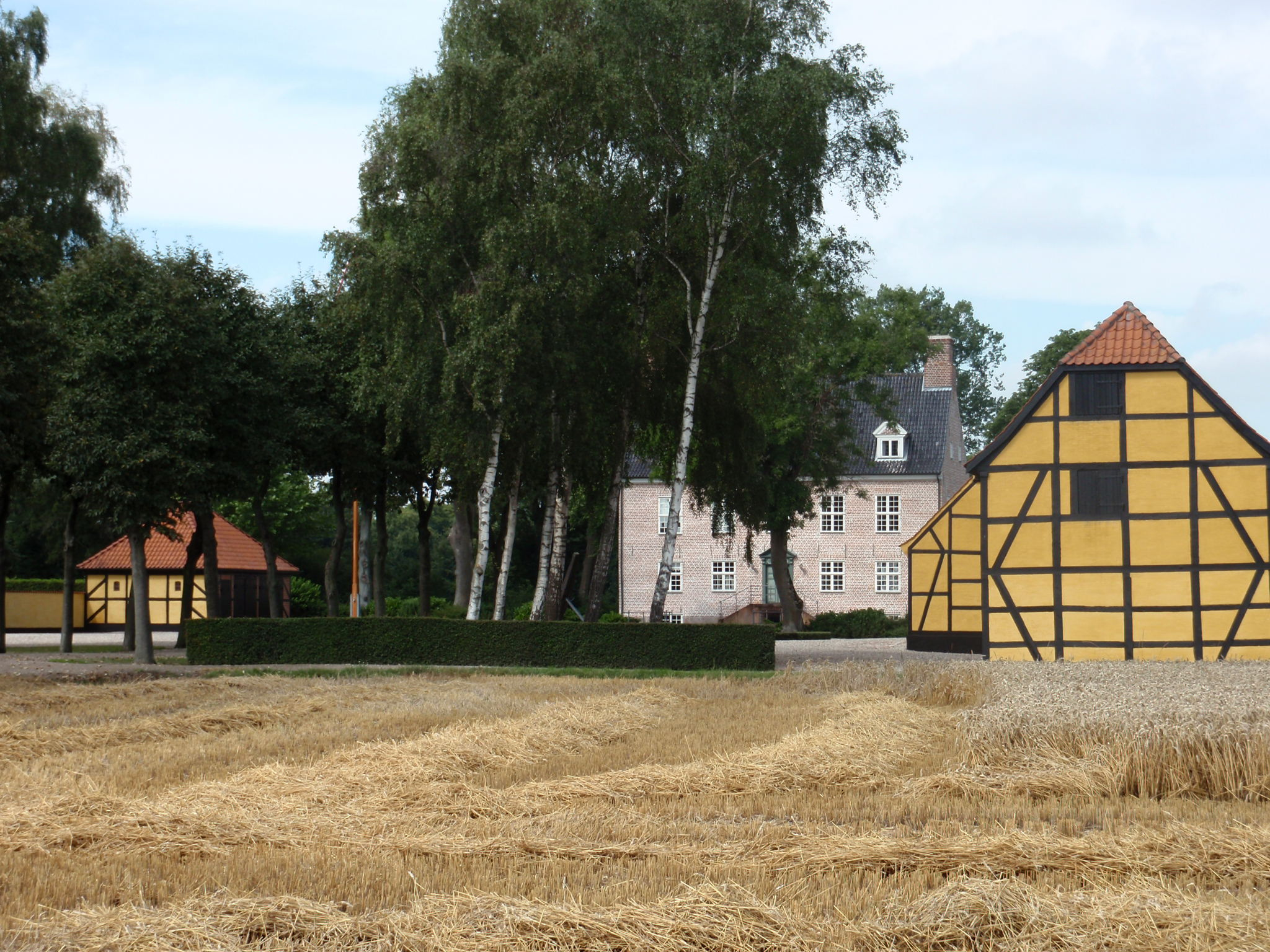
- Interactive map of the Bramsløkke area

General information
- Architectural style: Late Neoclassical
- Location: Lolland, Denmark
- Coordinates: 54°43′46.54″N 11°39′37.51″E
- Completed: c. 1690
- Renovated: 1760s, 1927
- Client: Hans Tersling

¨Bramsløkke is a manor house on the island of Lolland in southeastern Denmark. The main building is from c. 1690 and was listed on the Danish registry of protected buildings and places by the Danish Heritage Agency on 31 December 1959. The estate has been owned by the Mærsk Mc-Kinney Møller since 1939. It covers 243.1 hectares.

== History ==
Bramsløkke was in 1423 owned by the Holsteinan nobleman Oluf Pedersen Godov and the estate was later passed on to his brother Anders Pedersen Godov. A Henning van Hafn is in 1449 mentioned as a co-owner but Anders Pedersen Godov seems still to have been among the owners in 1456.

Im 1472, Bramsløkke was owned by Anders Pedersen Godovs's son-in-law Claus Reberg. His daughter Marine Clausdatter Reberg inherited the estate after his death in about 1493. Bramsløkke came into the possession of the noble Mormand through her marriage to Erik Mogensen Mormand in about 1520. He owned the property until his death in 1745 and the estate was then passed on to their son Mogens Eriksen Mormand. After his death in 1586, Bramsløkke was passed on to his two sons, Erik Mogensen Mormand and Claus Mogensen Mormand, who shared the ownership until Erik Mogensen bought out his brother. His widow, Anne Brok, became the owner after his death in 1603. When Erik Mormand's and Anne Brok's daughter, Barbara Mormand, married Erik Steensen 1625, Bramsløkke was ceded to them. The house was in disrepair and the couple therefore took up residence at Søllestedgård after acquiring it in 1629. Erik Steensen sold Bramsløkke in 1647.

The new owner was Lisbet Lunge, the widow of Palle Rosenkrantz of Krenkerup. Their daughter, Lisbet Rosenkrantz, inherited the estate which was ceded to her husband Frantz Rantzau after their marriage in 1649. He died just 26 years old in 1657 and the estate was then passed on to their son Johan Rantzau.

Johan Rantzau reached the rank of ritmester in the Royal Lige Guard and served as officer in the Scanian War. In 677 he sold Bramsløkke to Major-General Joachim Schack who already owned Kærstrup and Sneumgaard. He constructed the current main building. After his death in 1700, Bramsløkke w1800 passed on to one of his younger sons, Hans Schack, a lieutenant, while Kærstrup was taken over by his oldest son Otto Schack.

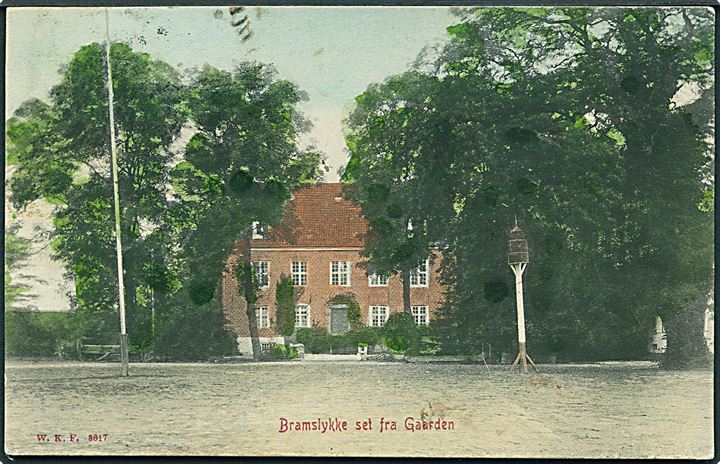
Bramsløkke

In 1705, Bramsløkke was taken over by Hans Schack's son, Niels Rosenkrantz Schack. He sold the estate to Otto Schack in 1715 but he died in 1719 and Niels Rosenkrantz Schack reacquired the estate in 1724. Rosenkrantz Schacks died in 1731, leaving the estate to his son Joachim Otto Schack. His guardian, Michael Numsen, sold the estate to Emerentia von Levetzau, Niels Rosenkrantz Schack's mother-in-law. Emerentia von Levetzau became a major landowner on Lolland founding the countship of Christiansholm for her grandson Christian Raben from Bramsløkke, Aalholm and Egholm in 1734. She retained control of the estate until her death in 1746. The young count, Christian Raben, died in 1750. The countship was then passed on to his younger brother Otto Ludvig Raben. The countship of Christiansholm was owned by his descendants until it was dissolved as a result of lensafløsningsloven 1921. The Raben-Levetzau family ceded Bramsløkke as a result of the requirements that followed from the new act. 20 smallholdings was established on part of the land. The rest of the estate was sold to Frederik Thy who had until then served as manager of the estate. He sold Bramsløkke to ship captain H. C. Lundgreen in 1927. He owned the estate to Mærsk McKinney Møller in 1939.d

== Architecture ==
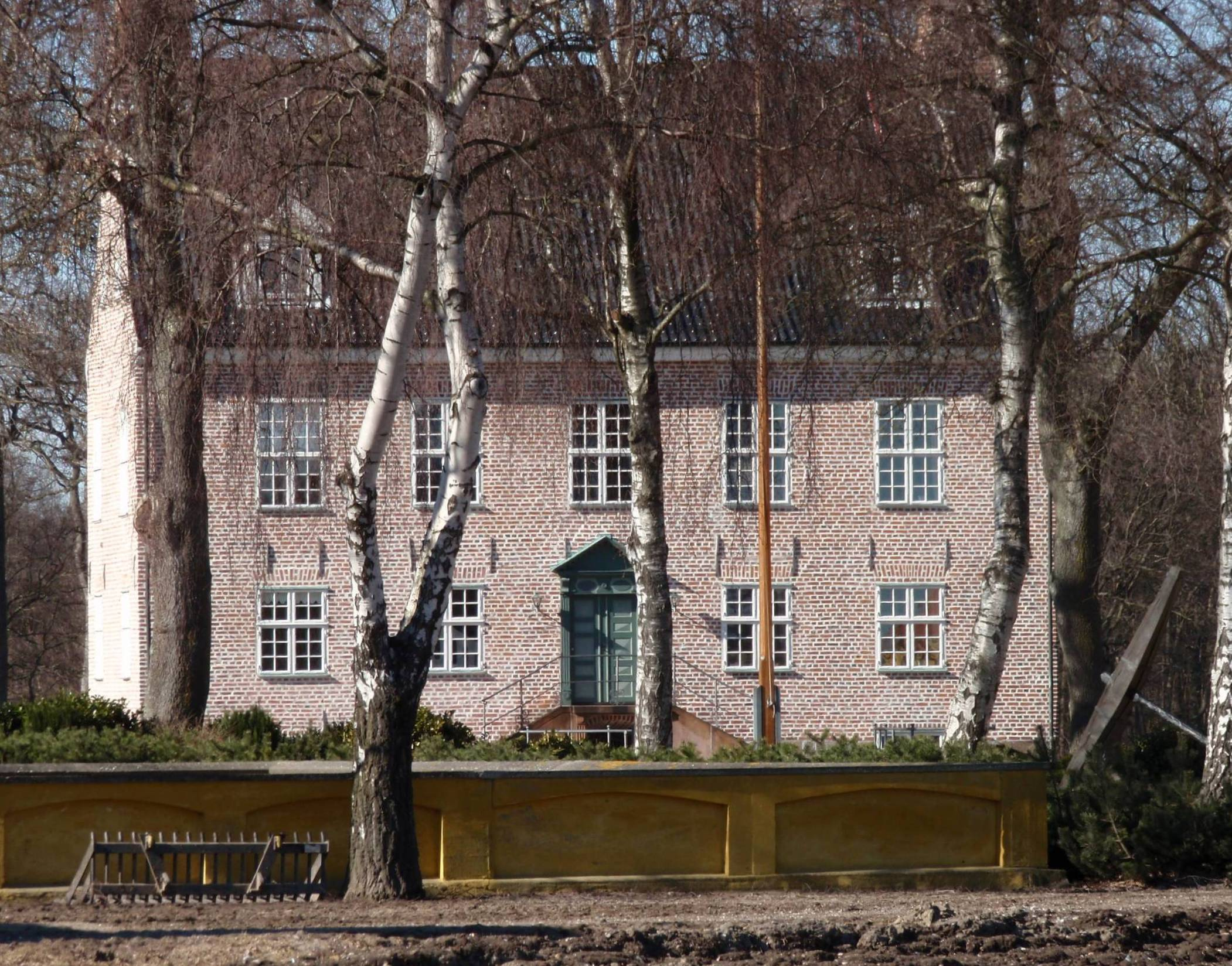
The main building

The main building was built shortly before 1900 for Joachim Schack and represents the transition from the Renaissance to the Baroque. It is a two-storey building with high cellar built in large, red brick and topped by a glazed tile roof. A tall chimney is located at each gable. Two small appendices are located on the west side (garden side) of the building. One of them originally contained a so-called "secret", that is toilets, while the other one was used for residential purposes.

A refurbishment of the house carried out by Frederik Raben in the 1760s resulted in the glazed tile roof, larger windows and the sandstone staircase in front of the main entrance. H.C. Lundgreen carried out a comprehensive renovation of the building in 1927. Water, electricity and central heating were installed.

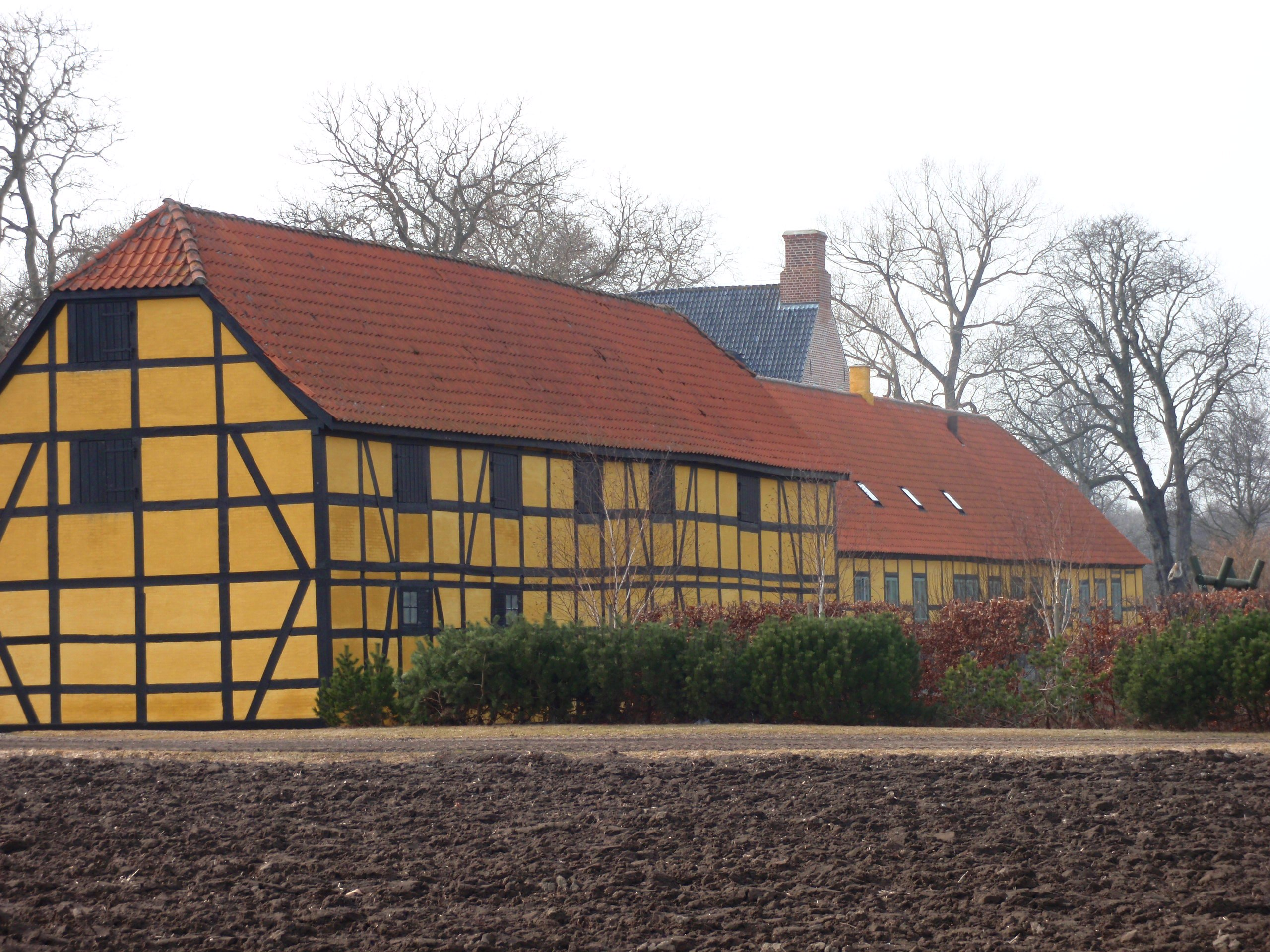
The building from 1854

The farm buildings were originally an asymmetrical, three-winged complex of half-timbered buildings from c. 1700. Much of it was destroyed in a fire in 1930. The barn and stables were rebuilt the same year but the original closed courtyard was not reconstructed. The courtyard is to the north now defined by a residence for the estate manager, a grain storage and a gateway built with timber framing in 1854.

== Today ==
Bramsløkke is today owned by Leise Mærsk Mc-Kinny Møller.

The estate has a total area of 243.1 hectares of which 173.1 hectares is farmland and 68hectares. The park covers two hectares.

== List of owners ==
- (O. 1423) Oluf Pedersen Godov
- (C. 1439-1460) Anders Pedersen Godov
- (O. 1449) Henning van Hafn
- (O. 1472) Claus Reberg
- (Beg. 1500-tal) Marine Clausdatter Reberg, gift med Erik Mogensen Mormand
- (1520-1545) Erik Mogensen Mormand
- (O. 1557) Mogens Eriksen Mormand
- (O. 1591) Erik Mogensen Mormand / Claus Mogensen Mormand
- (1545-1603) Claus Mogensen Mormand
- (1603-1625) Anne Brok, gift Mormand
- (1625) Barbara Clausdatter Mormand, gift Steensen
- (1625-1647) Erik Steensen
- (1647-1649) Lisbeth Rosenkrantz née Lunge
- (1649) Lisbeth Pallesdatter Rosenkrantz, gift Rantzau
- (1649-1657) Frantz Rantzau
- (1657-1677) Johan Rantzau
- (1677-1700) Joachim Schack
- (1700-1705) Hans Schack
- (1705-1715) Niels Rosenkrantz Schack
- (1715-1719) Otto Schack
- (1719-1731) Niels Rosenkrantz Schack
- (1732-1734) Emerentia Taben née von Levetzau
- (1734-1750) Christian Raben
- (1750-1791) Otto Ludvig Raben
- (1791-1838) Frederik Christian Raben
- (1838-1875) Gregers Frederik Raben
- (1875-1879) Julius Raben
- (1879-1889) Josias Raben-Levetzau
- (1889-1921) Frederik Christopher Otto Raben-Levetzau
- (1921-1927) Frederik Thy
- (1927-1939) Hans Carl Lundgreen
- (1939-1998) Arnold Mærsk Mc-Kinney Møller
- (1998-2009) Bramsløkke Landbrug A/S
- * (2009–present) Leise Mærsk Mc-Kinney Møller
