= Roulunds Fabrikker =

Danish component manufacturer

Roulunds Fabrikker was a manufacturer of vehicle brake pads, brake shoes & brake discs.

== History ==
The company dates to 7 November 1736 in Odense, Denmark. The company was founded when Laurits Winther (1705-1791) was granted citizenship as a ropemaker. His rope works was located at Sortebrødre Torv. It was continued by his son Søren Michael Winther (1755-1802) and grandson Rasmus Winther (1783-1823). Rasmus Winther's widow, Christiane Benedicte Winther née Ottesen took over the operations after her husband's death and ran the company until her own death in 1831. The company was then passed on to Rasmus Roulund (1806-1870), the son of the founder's daughter. His son, Peter Roulund (1839-1915), started a production of drive belts in 1872. The company was converted into a limited company (aktieselskab) in 19303.

Hans W. Andersen was appointed to CEO in 1911 and the company moved to new premises on Rugårdsvej in 1917. Andersen was succeeded as CEO by Erik Scheibel in 1923. The company began the manufacturing of V-belts, car brakes and other components for the automotive industry in 1926. The company continued to grow after World War II and reached 600 employees in the 1950s. It later moved to new premises at Hestehaven in Hjallese. It was acquired by thebusiness conglomerate A.P. Møller-Mærsk in 1961. It was sold in 2003 and divided into several smaller companies.

== Legacy ==
Roulunds Braking ApS which continues as a manufacturer of drive belts. Some of the building has been taken over by Coop Danmark. Coop Danmark constructed a 35 meter high warehouse at the site in 2009 as a replacement for their former non-food warehouse in central Odense.
