= Joachim Gersdorff =

Danish politician

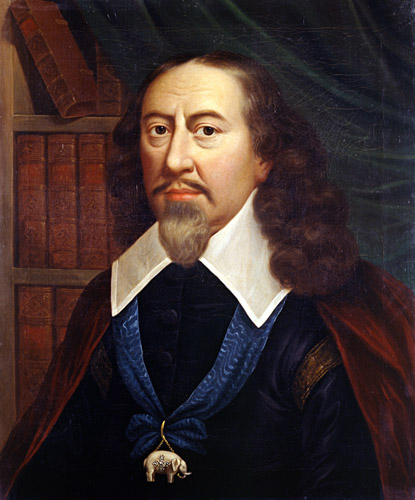
- Joachim Gersdorff, painted posthumously by Hans Hansen

Danish Steward of the Realm
- In office 1651–1660
- Monarch: Frederick III
- Preceded by: Corfitz Ulfeldt
- Succeeded by: None

Personal details
- Born: 12 November 1611 Søbygaard, Jutland, Denmark
- Died: 19 April 1661 (aged 49) Copenhagen, Denmark
- Profession: Statesman, Land owner
- Awards: Knight of the Elephant (1648)

Joachim Gersdorff (12 November 1611 - 19 April 1661) was a Danish politician, from 1650 to 1660 Steward of the Danish Realm. It was Gersdorff who negotiated the Treaty of Roskilde on Denmark's part during the Second Northern War, a war he had himself been in favour of entering. Through this treaty, which was concluded in Roskilde on 8 March 1658 (NS), the eastern Danish provinces of Scania, Halland, Blekinge and Bornholm were ceded to Sweden.

== Early life ==
Joachim Gersdorff was born at Søbygaard near Hammel in Jutland to German-born Christoffer von Gersdorff, an immensely rich magnate who, over the course of his lifetime, also accumulated numerous other estates such as Palstrup, Isgård, Vosnæsgård and Udstrup. Not much is known about Joachim Gersdorffs's early life, only that he attended Herlufsholm Boarding School from 1624 to 1629. His father died in 1635 and Joachim Gersdorff was accepted into the Danish nobility, choosing Søbygaard as his residence. In the late 1630s, he made a study trip to northern Germany, returning in 1640. In 1643, he married the young Øllegaard Henriksdatter Huitfeldt. In so doing, he added a number of estates in the Scanian provinces to his holdings.

== Political career ==
From 1646, he was promoted through the ranks at the Royal Court, culminating with his acceptance into the Danish Council of the Realm in late 1649. He was a popular and respected figure among the nobility and was held in high regard by the King, Frederick III, who had ascended the throne in 1648. In 1651 he was appointed Danish Steward of the Realm, at the same time receiving the island of Bornholm as a fief.

Gersdorff's marriage to Øllegaard Huitfeld was an unhappy one. She fell in love with Kai Lykke, a young military officer and womanizer from Gisselfeldt, and called for divorce in 1654. This was a hard blow to his esteem and several times he had to swallow the indignity of being refused lodging when calling on castles and manor houses around the country. In 1655, he led the process against Corfitz Ulfeldt, his predecessor as Steward of the Realm, who had been charged with embezzlement and treason and Ulfeldt's conviction restored Gersdorff's reputation.

From 1657 to 1660, Denmark was at war with Sweden and Gersdorff negotiated the peace on Denmark's behalf, leading to the Roskilde Treaty in 1658 which the east Danish Scanian provinces (Scania, Halland, Blekinge and Bornholm)were ceded to Sweden. At the signing of the treaty, Gersdorff is reported to have exclaimed:

If only I were unable to write, then I could never be accused of abandon and manslaughter for the many thousands of souls who have now been left behind in the bloody hands of the Swede. .

— Joachim Gersdorff

== Death ==
In 1661, Gersdorff became seriously ill and died shortly after. Rumour had it that he had been poisoned. Øllegaard and Gersdorff's servant, Godtfred, were both indicted and convicted. She was beheaded and he was exiled.

== See also ==
- List of Danish Stewards of the Realm
