= Siege of Aalborghus =

Part of the Torstenson War

- Part of the Torstenson War
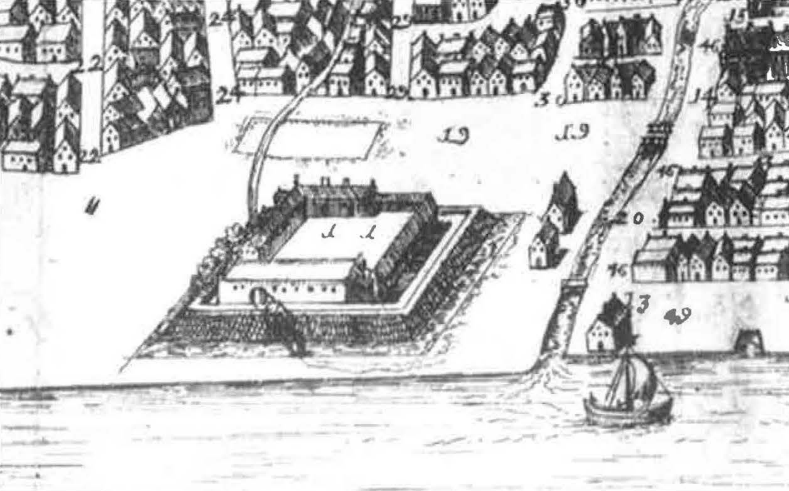
- Engraving of Aalborghus from Atlas Danicus by Peder Hansen Resen in 1677
| Date | 21 July – 4 August 1644 |
| Location | Aalborghus, Denmark–Norway (modern-day Denmark) 57°2′58″N 9°55′27″E |
| Result | Danish victory |
| Territorial changes | Aalborghus is recaptured by Danish forces |

Belligerents
| Denmark–Norway | (yes) Swedish Empire |

Commanders and leaders
| Vogn Vognsen; Jakob Andersen; Bernt Mogensen | (yes) Unk. quartermaster general (POW) |

Units involved
| Sankt Jan | (yes) Aalborghus garrison |

Strength
| Unknown number of men 2 warships | Unknown number of men 3 ships 19 guns |

Casualties and losses
| At least one killed | Most captured 3 ships destroyed |

The siege of Aalborghus (Note: Danish: belejringen af Aalborghus) occurred from 21 July to 4 August 1644 during the Torstenson War between Denmark and Sweden.

On 17 January, a Swedish cavalry regiment led by Helmut Wrangel captured Aalborg without a fight, and defeated a peasant force at Nørresundby the following day. Wrangel consolidated Swedish control of Aalborg, but that summer, the majority of Swedish forces in Jutland withdrew to respond to a threat posed by an imperial army led by Matthias Gallas. The Swedes left five garrisons behind, including one in Aalborghus.

On 21 July, a hastily assembled force of peasants and soldiers arrived to Aalborg under the command of Vogn Vognsen. The force entered the town unhindered, and two Danish warships arrived the next day. The Swedes received support from three Swedish "defense ships", but these were likely boarded by the Danes between 21 and 24 July.

Despite the loss of the three ships, the Swedes did not surrender. On 1 August, Vognsen took command of the Danish forces after having captured Voergaard, opting for a siege of Aalborghus to starve and bombard the Swedes into surrendering.

After the Swedish garrison had been weakened enough, Vognsen launched an assault on Aalborgus on 4 August, which succeeded.

== Background ==
On 13 December 1643, after months of preparation by Axel Oxenstierna, a Swedish army of 15,000 or 16,000 men invaded Holstein under the command of Lennart Torstensson, sparking the eponymous Torstenson War with between Denmark and Sweden.

After invading Holstein, Swedish forces quickly captured multiple towns before taking Christianspris on 19 December and Snoghøj on 14 January 1644.

As it had a harbor and granted access to the Kattegat, Norway, the Limfjord countryside, and Vendsyssel, Aalborg was an important objective for the Swedes. Accordingly, Torstensson sent a regiment of cavalry led by Helmut Wrangel on 16 January to capture Aalborg. Wrangel captured the town without a fight on 17 January.

On 18 January, a peasant force assembled at Nørresundby, but was defeated after the Swedes commanded by Wrangel attacked across the frozen Limfjord. Some 400 to 800 peasants died in the fighting, (Note: Estimates vary by source. According to Jakob Ørnbjerg, 400–600 peasants were killed. However, Niels Slange gave an estimate of 600–700 while Peder Dyrskjøt estimated 400. Additionally, a German chronicle from 1649 estimated 800 were killed.) while another 100 were captured and imprisoned inside the dungeon at Aalborghus.

Following the Swedish victory at Nørresundby, Wrangel consolidated Swedish control of Aalborg, stationing a Swedish garrison in Aalborghus and confiscating all the inhabitants' weapons. They also constructed a bridge across the Østerå and a pontoon bridge across the Limfjord.

Ships owned by Aalborg's citizens were seized and equipped for war, being manned by Swedish sailors. Heavy artillery was taken from three seized "defense ships" and brought into Aalborghus.

== Prelude ==
On 16 May 1644, the Danes defeated a Dutch auxiliary fleet hired by Sweden in the battle of Listerdyb, thwarting Swedish plans for an invasion of the Danish islands. That summer, an Imperial army led by Matthias Gallas entered northern Germany to cut Torstensson's retreat route. Torstensson withdrew most of his army southward to respond to the threat, leaving five garrisons in Ribe, Haderslev, Aarhus, Voergaard Castle, and Aalborghus.

After Torstensson retreated, the Danes moved to regain the initiative, and the Danish nobleman and oberst, Vogn Vognsen, was put in charge of recapturing Voergaard and Aalborghus. On 9 June, he was given 300 rigsdaler by Anders Bille to fund Danish operations in northern Jutland.

== Siege ==
On 15 July, the Swedes evacuated Vendsyssel and Aalborg, leaving the garrisons in Voergaard and Aalborghus to sustain Swedish control. On 21 July, Vognsen arrived in Aalborg with a hastily assembled force of peasants and soldiers, and his entry into the town was unhinered by the Swedes. Two Danish warships arrived on the same day, commanded by Bernt Mogensen and Jakob Andersen, the former of whom commanded the Sankt Jan, which had 13 guns and a crew of 50 men.

The ships anchored off Aalborghus and began bombarding the castle. The Swedes defended Aalborghus with the 19 guns in the castle and received support from three nearby Swedish ships on the Limfjord. The Swedes bombarded the narrow strait between Aalborg and Nørresundby, preventing Vognsen from shipping troops and supplies to Vendsyssel to facilitate the capture of Voergaard. The exchange of fire was fierce, and Mogensen wrote that:

On the same day, by order of the oberst in Aalborg, the noble Vogn Vognsen, I was thus commanded to proceed out before the castle’s redoubts to see if it was possible to capture them. To this end, I exerted my utmost and greatest diligence and fired 123 shots at and upon the same redoubts.

Between 21 and 24 July, the Danes likely managed to board the Swedish ships, as they dismantled the guns on board the ships from 24 to 26 July. As the Danes did not have enough manpower to crew the ships, they were set on fire and allowed to drift away. The guns seized from the Swedish ships were used for the attack on Voergaard.

With the Swedish ships destroyed, the Danes regained control of the Limfjord, and it was thus possible for the Danes to ship troops across it to capture Voergaard and Vendsyssel. Voergaard was captured on 31 July by Vognsen. Meanwhile, Danish forces remaining at Aalborg continued bombarding Aalborghus, and Mogensen wrote:

When I again sailed out before the Castle, fired three pieces [cannons] loaded with double shot, which were fired upon the redoubt and the castle wall.

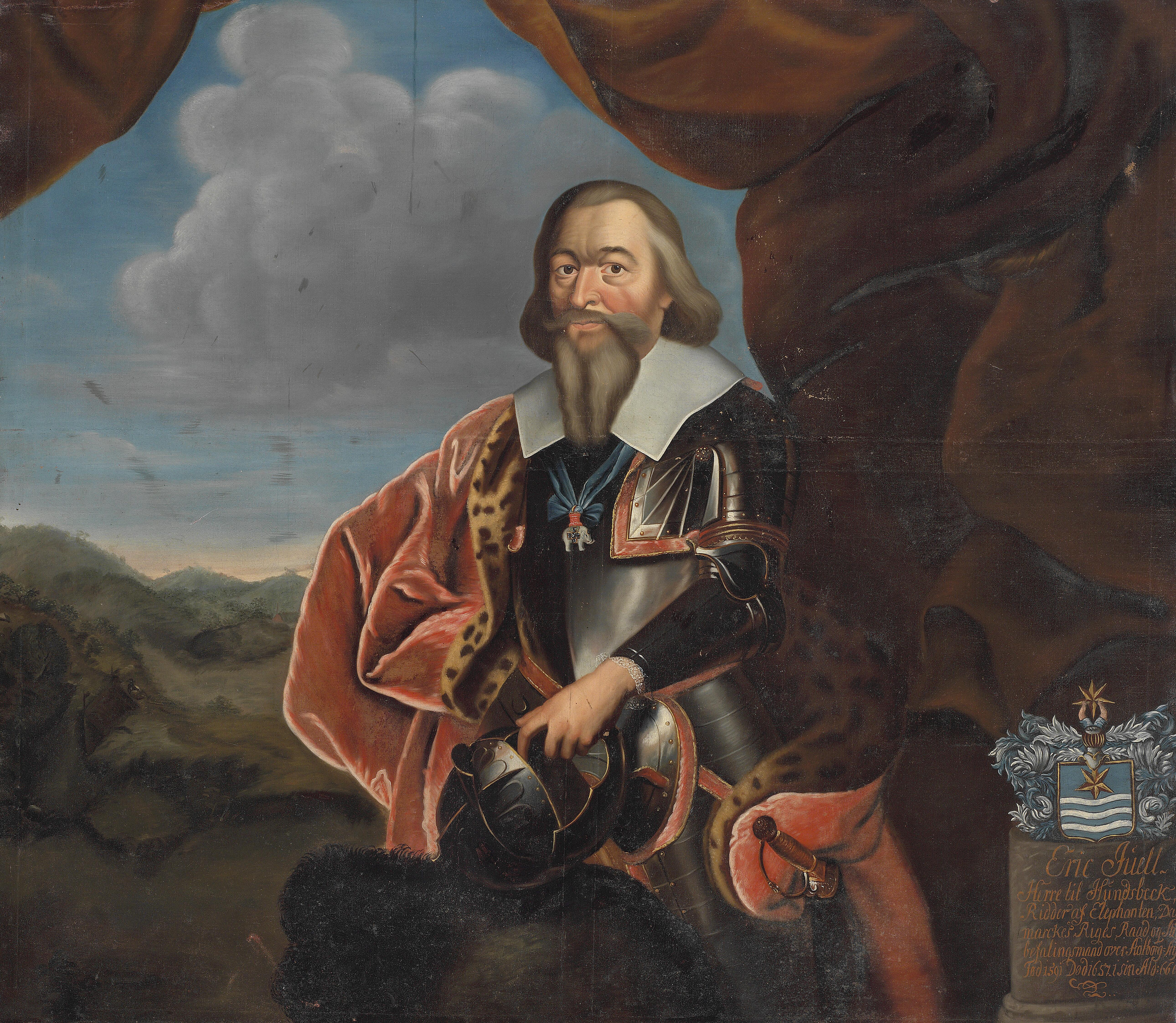
18th-century portrait of Erik Juel

Despite the loss of the three ships, the Swedes refused to surrender, and the Swedes and Danes exchanged fire on 30 July. Niels Krag and Erik Juel, responsible for Jutland's defense, also arrived in Aalborg with pay and reinforcements for Vognsen's force. With the ships lost, the Swedish communication lines and escape routes had been cut. Fighting moved into Aalborg, and Vognsen took command on 1 August. Instead of launching an assault on the castle, which had moats, redoubts, palisades, alongside heavy artillery, Vognsen besieged the castle to starve and bombard the Swedes into surrendering.

Because his men were in need of supplies, Vognsen purchased these from Christen van Ginchel. The supplies included ten firearms, eight swords, six bandoliers, and 38 oak poles to serve as pikes. He also purchased a ship-pound of casting musket balls and 157 cannonballs. Furthermore, Christen van Ginchel purchased ladders from Peter Henriksen in case Aalborghus was stormed and the Danes had to scale the ramparts.

To clear space for artillery batteries and obtain material for cover works, Vognsen tore down some houses in Aalborg. Vognsen established a position with 12 guns in and around Poul Jørgensen Pop's merchant house, south of Aalborghus. Meanwhile, the Danes on the Limfjord continued bombarding Aalborghus from the north. After establishing his position, Vognsen began bombarding the castle, and the Danish bombardment eventually "made a large hole in the wall up toward the rampart". The Swedes returned heavy fire from the castle.

Fighting was concentrated between Vognsen's position at the merchant house and the Swedish guns on the castle's southern rampart. Fighting also took place at Slotsgade, where the Danes had set up another position. At Slotsgade, the Swedes managed to set fire to one of the houses on 4 August. Eventually, the Swedish garrison was so weakened by the Danish bombardment that Vognsen launched an assault on the castle on 4 August, which was successful. According to a testimony during a dispute over a horse trade on 17 October, the Swedes had been forced to flee from the castle and the Danish cavalry pursued the Swedes.

== Aftermath ==
Despite some possibly escaping, the majority of the Swedish garrison was captured, including Helmut Wrangel's quartermaster general. Not much is known about the casualties suffered on either side during the siege. However, a man named Peder Koffertsen was buried on 28 July, being recorded as having been "shot by the Swedes".

Before sending the captured Swedes to Copenhagen, an inspection of Aalborghus was conducted by Vognsen. They also examined the captured quartermaster to find out how the confiscation of the fief lord's money had taken place, back in January.

== See also ==
- Battle of Nørresundby – Part of the Torstenson War
- Siege of Snoghøj – Part of the Torstenson War
