= 1540s in Denmark =

Events from the 1540s in Denmark.

== Incumbents ==
- Monarch – Christian III
- Steward of the Realm – Mogens Gøye (until 1544), Eske Bille (from 1547)

== Events ==
1541

- The Royal Mint relocates to the former St. Clare's Priory in Copenhagen.
- Eriksen Banner succeeds Tyge Krabbe as Marshal of the Realm.

== Births ==
1540

- 5 September – Magnus, Duke of Holstein, prince of Denmark and titular King of Livonia (died 1583 in Latvia)

1542

- 9 November 1542 – Anders Sørensen Vedel, priest and historiographer (died 1616)

1543

- Anders Foss, bishop (died 1607)

1544

- 26 November – Hans Christensen Sthen, clergy (died 1610)

1545

- 25 March – John II, Duke of Schleswig-Holstein-Sonderburg (died 1622)
- 29 June – Dorothea of Denmark, duchess (died 1617 in Germany)

1546

- 11 September 1546 – Arild Huitfeldt, historian (died 1609)
- 14 December – Tycho Brahe, astronomer (died 1601)

1547

- 21 December – Steen Ottesen Brahe, privy counsellor and landowner (died 1620)

1548

- Magnus Heinason, Faroese sailor and privateer (died 1589)

Date unknown

- Axel Gyldenstierne (c. 1542), Governor-general of Norway (died 1603)
- Ingeborg Skeel (c. 1545), landowner and county sheriff (died 1604)

== Deaths ==
1543

- Gyde Spandemager, alleged witch

1544

- 6 April – Mogens Gøye, statesman (born c. 1470)

1547

- Jørgen Friis, clergy
