= 1602 in Denmark =

- Decades: 1580s; 1590s; 1600s; 1610s; 1620s
- See also: Other events of 1602; List of years in Denmark

Events from the year 1602 in Denmark.

== Incumbents ==
- Monarch – Christian IV

== Events ==
- The Danish–Icelandic Trade Monopoly is enacted.
- Hedevig, the king's older sister, marries Elector Christian II of Saxony.

== Births ==
- 22 March – Iver Krabbe, nobleman and military officer (died 1666)
- 7 December – Anne Holck, noblewoman (died 1660)

== Deaths ==
- 21 February – Anne Oldeland, noblewoman
- 8 April – Ludvig Munk, nobleman (born 1537)
- 14 May – Niels Krag, academic and diplomat (born 1550)
- 28 July – Peder Sørensen, physician (born c. 1542)
- 28 October – John, Prince of Schleswig-Holstein, prince of Denmark (born 1583)
