= 1611 in Denmark =

- Decades: 1590s; 1600s; 1610s; 1620s; 1630s
- See also: Other events of 1611; List of years in Denmark

Events from the year 1611 in Denmark.

== Incumbents ==
- Monarch – Christian IV
- Steward of the Realm –

== Events ==
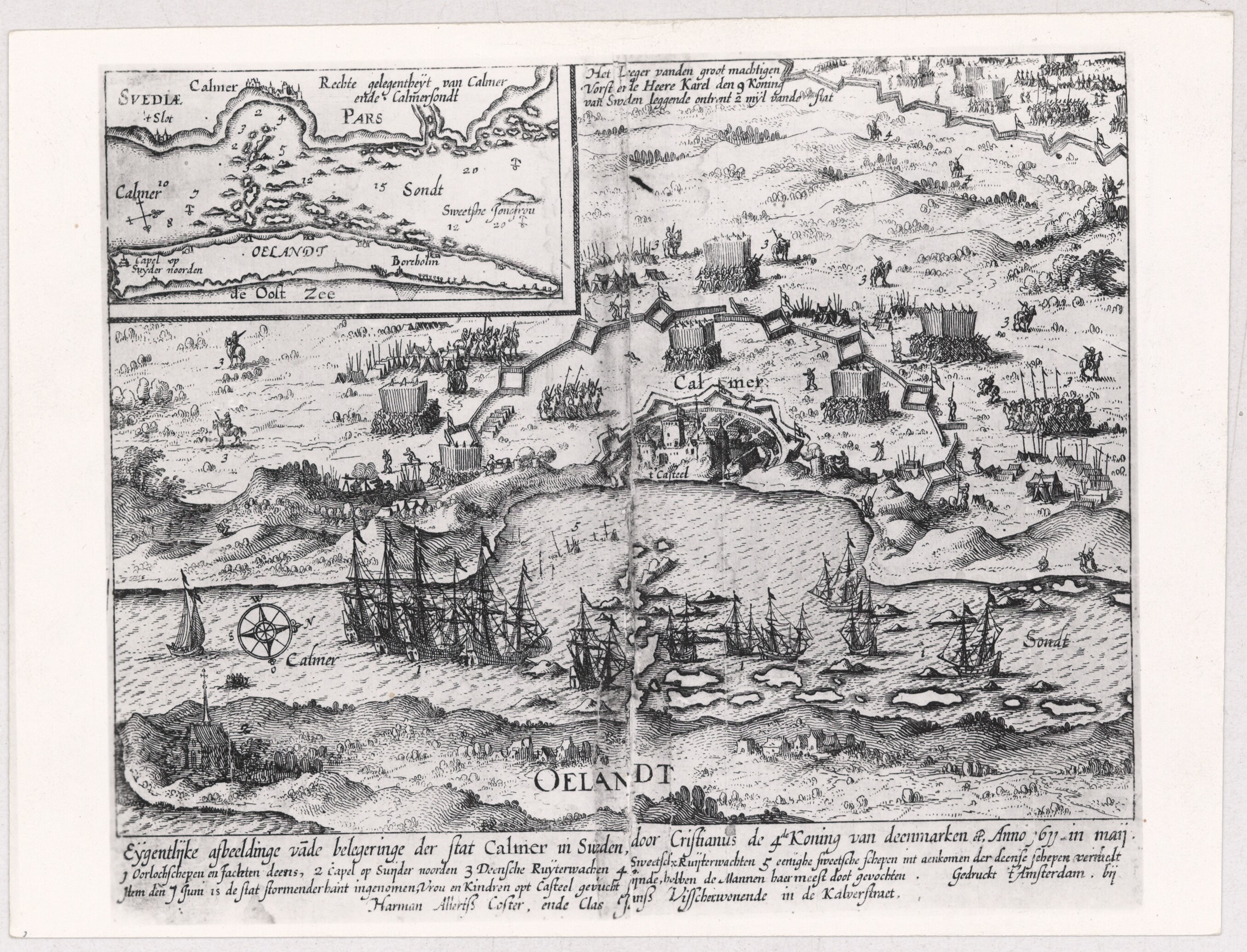
The Siege of Kalmar

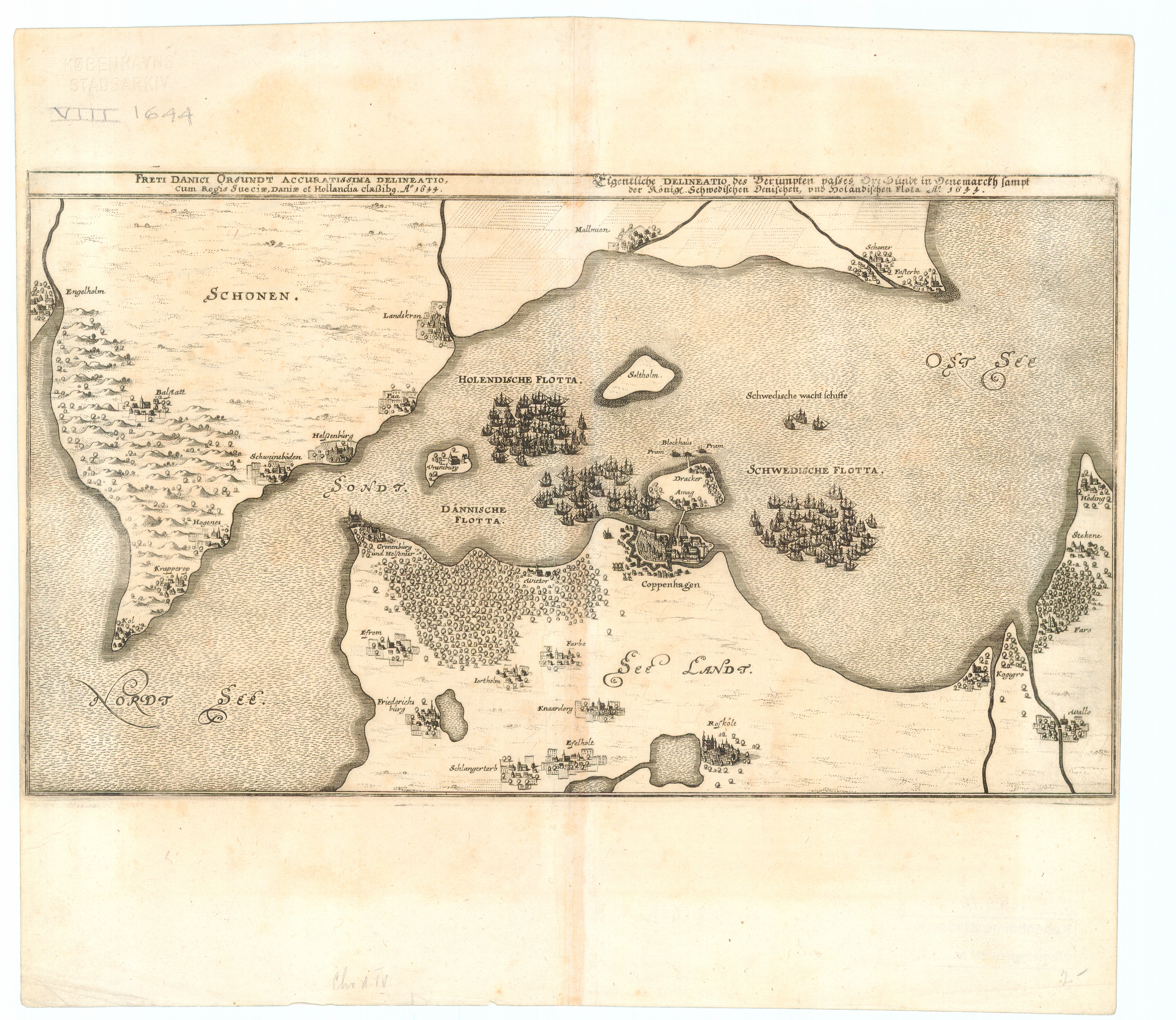
The Swedish attack on Zealand

- April – The Kalmar War begins as Denmark-Norway declares war upon Sweden.
- 3 May – Danish forces lay siege to Kalmar. The Siege of Kalmar ends on August 3.
- 26 June – The Swedish Storming of Kristianopel.
- 3 July – Battle of Risbye.

Undated

- A Statue of Leda and the Swan is mounted on a tall column an installed on an artificial islet in the Port of Copenhagen.

== Births ==
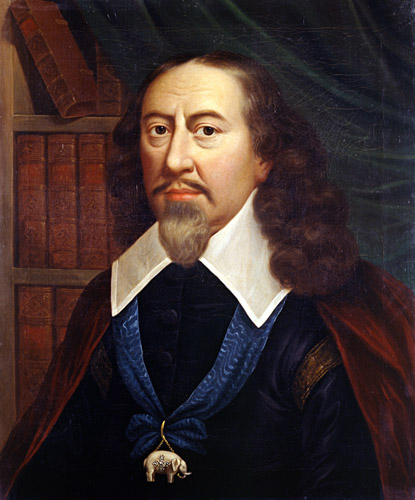
Joachim Gersdorff.

- 2 February – Ulrik of Denmark, Prince of Denmark (died 1633 in Poland)
- 3 February – Christian Ulrik Gyldenløve, military officer (died 1640)

Undated

- 12 November – Joachim Gersdorff, statesman (died 1661)

== Publications ==
- Caspar Bartholin the Elder, Anatomicae Institutiones Corporis Humani (1611)
