= 1604 in Denmark =

- Decades: 1580s; 1590s; 1600s; 1610s; 1620s
- See also: Other events of 1604; List of years in Denmark

Events from the year 1604 in Denmark.

== Incumbents ==
- Monarch - Christian IV
- Steward of the Realm;

== Events ==
=== Undated ===
- Christian IV's Arsenal is completed at Slotsholmen in Copenhagen

== Deaths ==
- May 13 – Christine of Hesse, Duchess consort (born 1543)
- 17 October – Ingeborg Skeel, noble, land owner and county sheriff (b. c.1545)
