= 1616 in Denmark =

- Decades: 1590s; 1600s; 1610s; 1620s; 1630s
- See also: Other events of 1616; List of years in Denmark

Events from the year 1616 in Denmark.

== Incumbents ==
- Monarch – Christian IV

== Events ==
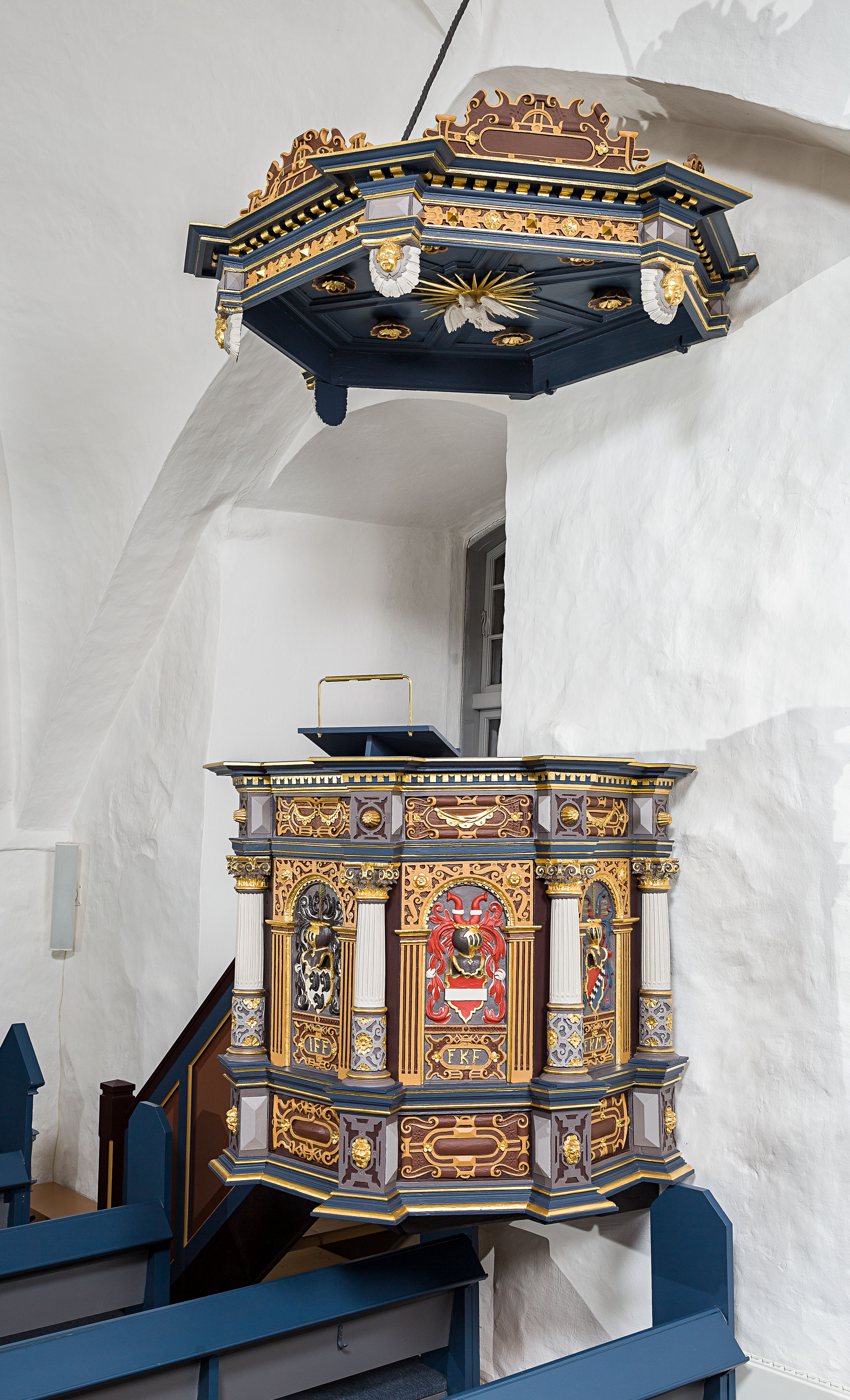
Pulpit of Otterup Church

- 17 March – Danish East India Company receives a monopoly on trade on Danish India.
- 29 November – The first fleet of the Danish East India Company departs from Copenhagen under the command of Ove Gjedde.
- 2 December – The Order of the Armed Arm is bestowed for the first and only time, at the great celebrations that took place in Kolding, on the occasion of the enfeoffment of Slesvig to the King's nephew,

Undated

- Johan Friis and Karen Krabbe presents a new pulpit to Otterup Church.

== Births ==
- 27 or 28 January – Christen Aagaard, poet (died 1664)
- 20 October – Thomas Bartholin, physician, mathematician, and theologian (died 1680)

== Deaths ==
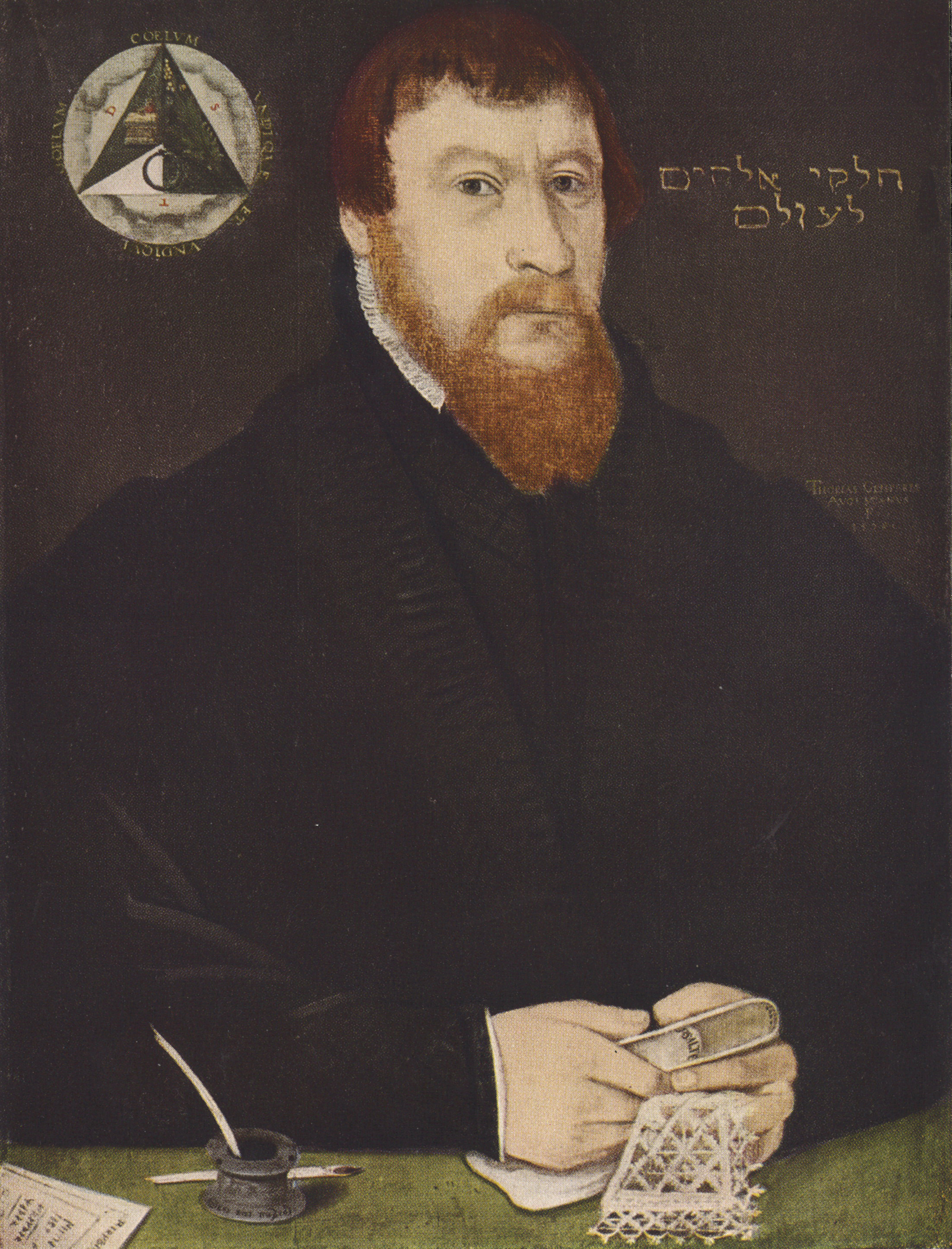
Anders Sørensen Vedel.

- 13 February – Anders Sørensen Vedel, priest and historiographer (born 1542)

Undated

- Jørgen Friis, Governor-general of Norway
