= Battle of Nørresundby =

Part of the Torstenson War

- Part of the Torstenson War
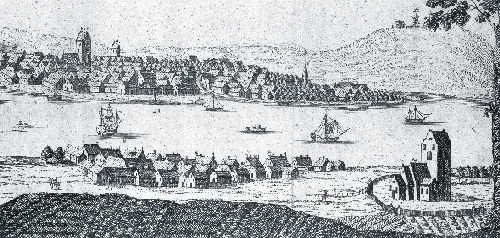
- Channel between Nørresundby and Aalborg in 1769, by Erik Pontoppidan
Date	18–19 January 1644
Location	Nørresundby, Denmark–Norway (modern-day Denmark) 57°04′N 9°55′E
Result	Swedish victory
Territorial changes	Vendsyssel is occupied by Swedish forces

Belligerents
(yes) Swedish Empire	Denmark–Norway

Commanders and leaders
(yes) Helmut Wrangel (yes) Unknown commander †	Lars Dyrskjøt †; Jens Høeg

Units involved
(yes) One cavalry regiment	Peasant militia

Strength
Unknown	Unknown

Casualties and losses
75 killed	400–800 killed 100 captured

The battle of Nørresundby (Note: also called the massacre in Nørresundby,) occurred from 18 to 19 January 1644 during the Torstenson War between Denmark and Sweden.

After seizing Snoghøj, Lennart Torstensson sent a cavalry regiment under the command of Helmut Wrangel to Aalborg. Aalborg was an important objective for the Swedes as it provided access to the Kattegat, Norway, the Limfjord, and Vendsyssel. After arriving on 17 January, the town immediately surrendered, and Wrangel was able to capture the merchant fleet in Aalborg's harbor.

The following day, a peasant force under the command of Lars Dyrskjøt and Jens Høeg assembled north of the Limfjord, armed with swords, homemade spears, and firearms. The peasants did not wait for reinforcements, and after the Swedes charged across the frozen Limfjord, the peasant force dissolved after firing a single volley. Fighting continued into Nørresundby on 19 January, but ended soon after.

== Background ==
Frustrated by perceived Danish disruptions of Swedish activities in the Thirty Years' War, Axel Oxenstierna, the chancellor of Sweden, began planning a preemptive war with Denmark in May 1643. According to his plan, a Swedish army under the command of Lennart Torstensson was to invade Jutland from Germany and then be transported to the Danish islands. Another army under the command of Gustav Horn would invade Scania.

After being ordered to attack Denmark in October 1643, Torstensson prepared defenses on the borders of Bohemia and Moravia before marching northwest. He led about 15,000 or 16,000 men in total, 12,000 of whom were national troops. Only after arriving at Havelberg on 6 December were Torstensson's officers informed of the attack on Denmark.

The Swedish army assembled at Ratzeburg on 11 December and invaded Holstein on 13 December. They captured Segelburg, Itzehoe, Kiel, and Breitenburg, and then moved toward Christianspris. Christianspris would be captured on 19 December, after which Swedish forces defeated a Danish force at Kolding. Swedish forces then captured Snoghøj.

== Prelude ==
Due to its harbor and the access it provided to the Kattegat, Norway, the Limfjord countryside, and Vendsyssel, Aalborg was an important objective for the Swedes.

After Viborg fell on 16 January, Torstensson sent Helmut Wrangel with one regiment of cavalry to Aalborg. Despite having ramparts on the roads approaching the town, Gunde Lange, who held Aalborghus as a fief, and the town magistracy, did not attempt to defend the town. When Wrangel arrived outside the town on 17 January, Anders Andersen Ringkøbing, the bishop of the Diocese of Aalborg, alongside a deputation of Aalborg's priests, went to meet Wrangel to surrender the town. They did so because a rumor had spread that Wrangel intended to burn down the town.

Wrangel personally guaranteed Anders Andersen that his residence would not be plundered. The Swedes were also able to confiscate the merchant fleet at Aalborg and a large amount of goods, as storms, frost, and contrary winds prevented them from leaving.

Aalborghus initially resisted, although the garrison only had 10 firearms. However, it capitulated after 24 hours of fighting, during which 29 people were killed.

== Battle ==
On 18 January, it became known that a force of armed peasants under the command of local noblemen and wealthy farmers had blocked the road to Vendsyssel. According to an account by Peder Dyrskjøt, the "captain of the peasants" was Peder's father, Lars Dyrskjøt. Additionally, Jens Høeg of Vang commanded the peasants.

The peasants were armed with swords, firearms, and homemade spears and took up positions on the north side of the Limfjord, roughly opposite Aalborghus. According to tradition, the peasants killed a negotiator at Sundby Kær that the Swedes had sent over. The peasants were also "utterly furious" and would not wait for reinforcements from nearby districts.

The cold weather caused the Limfjord to freeze over, allowing Wrangel to launch a frontal assault across the ice against the peasants. The attack either came directly from Aalborghus or across the channel between Signalbakken and Sundby Hage.

In Peder Dyrskjøt's account, the Swedes "came as if in a flying, broad formation." If classic Swedish tactics were followed, the Swedish cavalry fired their pistols before drawing their swords. After firing a single volley at the Swedish cavalry, the peasant force collapsed while trying to reload. The Swedes pursued the peasants into Nørresundby, where urban warfare broke out the following day. During the urban fighting, the Swedes set fire to the houses from which peasants were firing on them, burning the peasants alive.

== Aftermath ==
Estimates of the casualties suffered by the peasants vary. According to Jakob Ørnbjerg, some 400–600 peasants were killed, and another 100 were captured. Niels Slange gives a figure of 600 to 700 peasants killed, while Peder Dyrskjøt gives an estimate of 400. A German chronicle from 1649 gave an estimate of 800.

The captured peasants were packed into the dungeons in Aalborghus, where most of them died from heat and thirst. They also cannibalized each other. In a later account from 1677, Peder Hansen Resen stated that 71 Swedish cavalrymen and their commander were killed (who was not Wrangel). Additionally, Lars Dyrskjøt shot three Swedish cavalrymen before being killed by a shot between the shoulders.

After defeating the peasants, Wrangel occupied Vendsyssel and then consolidated control of Aalborg. The Swedes confiscated all the inhabitants' weapons, and a Swedish garrison was stationed in Aalborghus. They also strengthened its fortifications, built a bridge across the Østerå, and constructed a pontoon bridge across the Limfjord.

== See also ==
- Siege of Snoghøj – Part of the Torstenson War
- Siege of Hammershus – Part of the Torstenson War
