= 1612 in Denmark =

- Decades: 1590s; 1600s; 1610s; 1620s; 1630s
- See also: Other events of 1612; List of years in Denmark

Events from the year 1612 in Denmark.

== Incumbents ==
- Monarch – Christian IV

== Events ==
- 11 February – Danish forces attack the Swedish army at the Battle of Vittsjö, forcing the army to flee north from Scania.
- 21 February – The Battle of Skillingehed takes place in Halland between the Swedish army and forces led by Christian IV. Christian Barnekow famously sacrifices his life to save King Christian IV's.
- 26 August – A Norwegian peasant militia is ambushed by Scottish mercenaries at the Battle of Kringen as part of the Kalmar War.

Undated

- Johanne Thomes is accused of witchcraft as part of the Køge Huskors witch trials.

== Births ==
- 11 November – August Philipp, Duke of Schleswig-Holstein-Sonderburg-Beck, (died 1675 in the Holy Roman Empire)

Undated

- Niels Aagaard, librarian and scholar (died 1657)

== Deaths ==
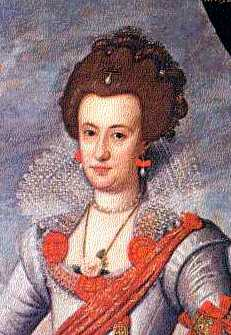
Anne Catherine of Brandenburg.

- 8 April – Anne Catherine of Brandenburg, Queen consort of Denmark and Norway (Born 1575 in the Holy Roman Empire)

Undated

- Godske Lindenov, arctic explorer
- Jørgen Dybvad, theologian and mathematician
