= Listed buildings in Brønderslev Municipality =

This list of listed buildings in Brønderslev Municipality lists listed buildings in Brønderslev Municipality, Denmark.

== The list ==
Listing name	Image	Location	Year built	Contributing resource	Ref
Dorf Vandmølle og Dorf Møllegård (5)		Storskovvej 39, 9330 Dronninglund		19th-century water mill and the miller's house consisting of a main building from 1925, stables, barn, chicken coop, notary's house and cobbled courtyard	Ref4
Dorf Windmill		Slotsgade 2, 9330 Dronninglund	1887	Wind mill from 1887	Ref
Dronninglund Manor (2)		Skjoldenæsvej 136, 4174 Jystrup Midtsj		Dronninglund Manor is a three-winged complex situated northwest of Dronninglund Castle	Ref
Dronninglund Castle		Hammelmosevej 21, 9700 Brønderslev		Three-winged castle	Ref
Hammelmose		Hammelmosevej 21, 9700 Brønderslev		Main building's eastern wings	Ref
Hjermitslevgård (3)		Skjoldenæsvej 106, 4174 Jystrup Midtsj		Three-winged complex consisting of a west wing in brick from c. 1575-1600, a half-timbered south win from c. 1650-1700) and an eastern main wing from 1883	Ref
Voergård Castle		Voergård 6, 9330 Dronninglund		16th-century, Renaissance-style, four-winged castle wit surrounding moats	Ref
