= 1620 in Denmark =

- Decades: 1600s; 1610s; 1620s; 1630s; 1640s
- See also: Other events of 1620; List of years in Denmark

Events from the year 1620 in Denmark.

== Incumbents ==
- Monarch – Christian IV

== Events ==
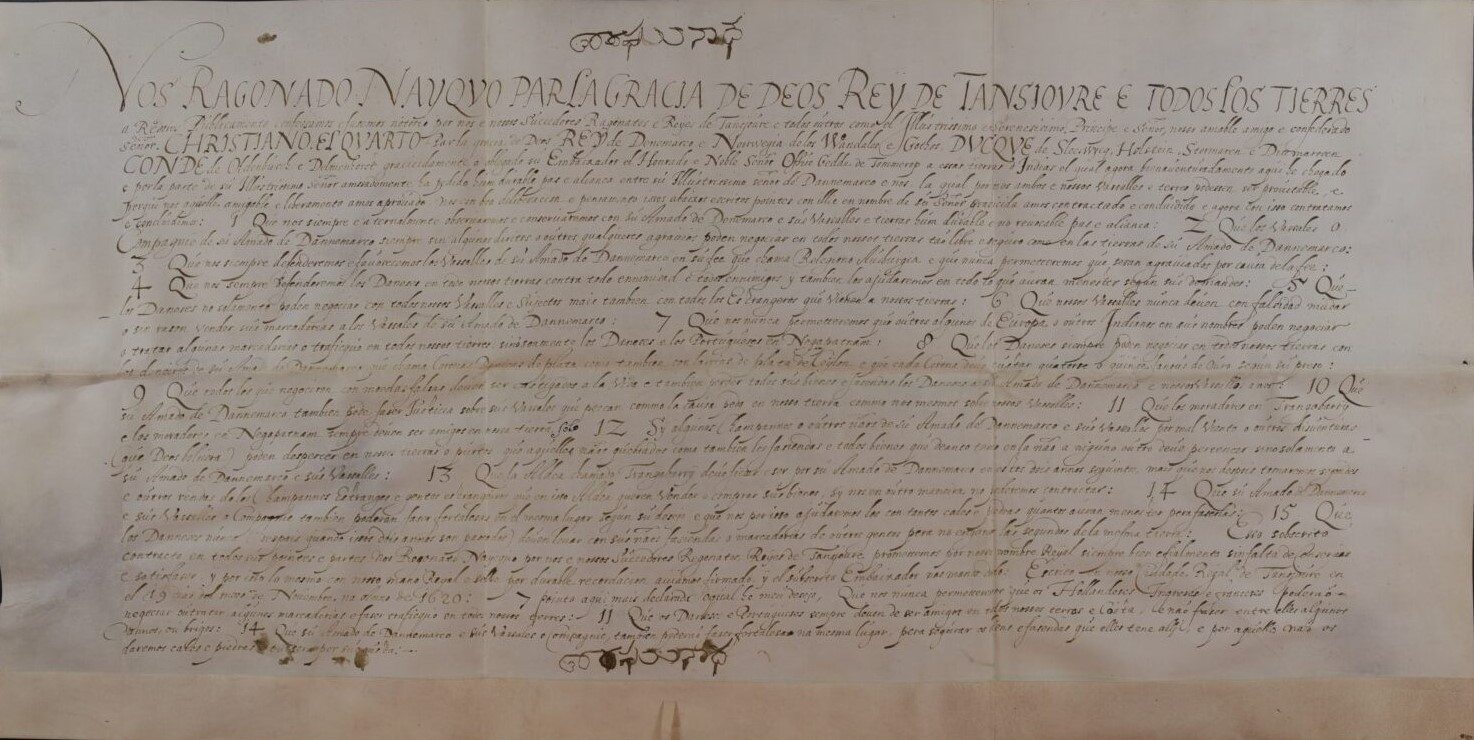
18 November: The Tranquebar Treaty of 1620 is signed.

- 10 May – An expedition led by Admiral Ove Gjedde arrives in Ceylon
- 19 November – The Tranquebar Treaty is signed with the Nayak of Tanjore, giving Denmark possession of Tharangambadi (Danish: Trankebar) and the right to construct Fort Dansborg.

Undated

- The construction of the original Knippelsbro is completed.

== Births ==
=== Full date unknown ===
- Just Ebel, army officer (died 1700)
- Dina Vinhofvers, silk worker and accuser of Corfitz Ulfeldt (died 1651)

== Deaths ==
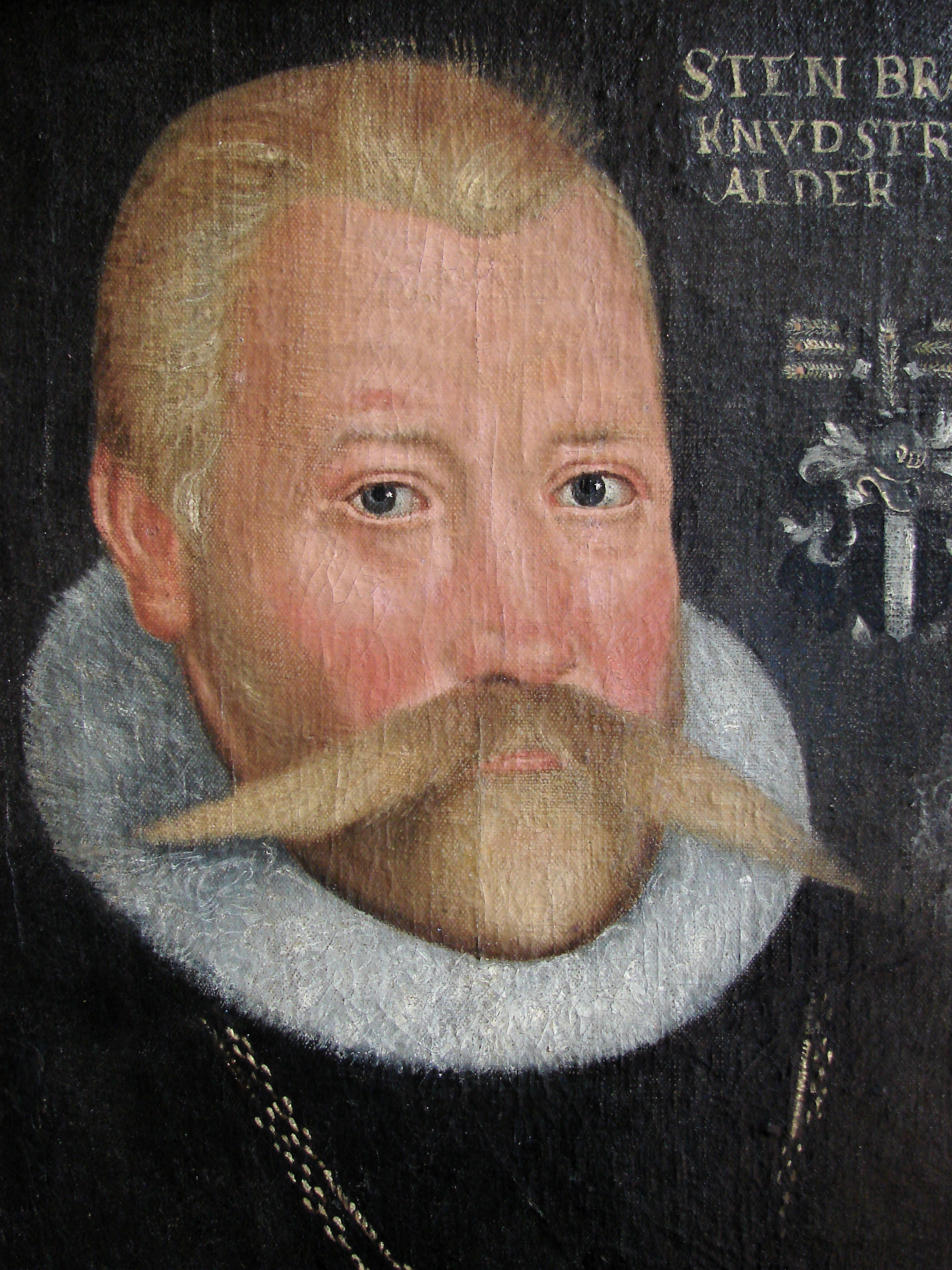
Steen Ottesen Brahe.

- 11 April – Steen Ottesen Brahe, privy counsellor and landowner (born 1547)
- 4 August – Karen Roeds, accused witch
