= 1601 in Denmark =

- Decades: 1580s; 1590s; 1600s; 1610s; 1620s
- See also: Other events of 1601; List of years in Denmark

Events from the year 1601 in Denmark.

== Incumbents ==
- Monarch — Christian IV
- Steward of the Realm — Christoffer Valkendorff (until 17 January)

== Events ==
- King Christian IV orders the construction of a permanent wooden bridge over the Børsgraven canal to improve access to the Copenhagen shipyard.

== Births ==
- 13 September – Axel Urup, military officer and supreme court justice (died 1671)

== Deaths ==
- 17 January – Christoffer Valkendorff, Danish-Norwegian statesman and Steward of the Realm (born 1525)
- 24 October – Tycho Brahe, astronomer and alchemist (born 1546)
