= 1605 in Denmark =

- Decades: 1580s; 1590s; 1600s; 1610s; 1620s
- See also: Other events of 1605; List of years in Denmark

Events from the year 1605 in Denmark.

== Incumbents ==
- Monarch – Christian IV

== Events ==
- 31 March – Isaac Pieterszoon van Amsterdam is appointed 'commissioner of the Sound', to ensure that Dutch trade ships would return to the Netherlands.

=== Undated ===
- Christian IV's 1st Greenland Expedition, consisting of the ships Trist Den Røde Løve and Katten, commanded by John Cunningham, is sent to Greenland to reestablish contact with the lost Norse settlements and then to exploit the silver and gold ore supposedly returned by the first expedition.

== Births ==
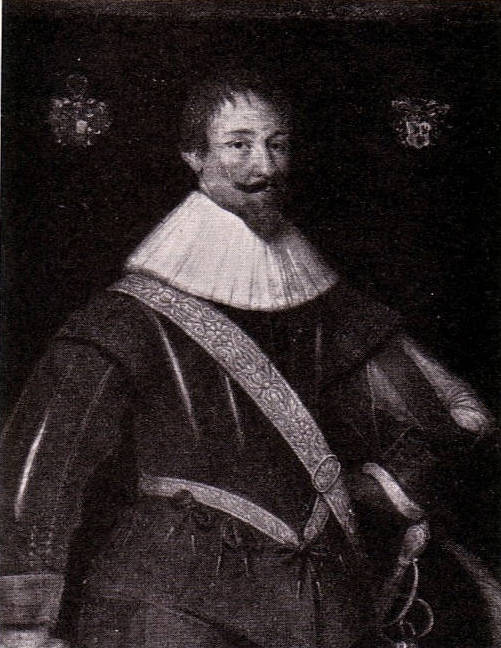
Otto Skeel.

- 6 April – Simon Paulli, physician and naturalist (died 1680)
- 10 April – Christian, Prince-Elect of Denmark, prince of Denmark (died 1647)
- 30 April – Peder Winstrup, clergy (died 1679)
- 29 November– Otto Skeel, naval officer (died 1644)

== Deaths ==
- 18 October – Beate Clausdatter Bille, noblewoman and Chief Lady-in-Waiting (born 1526)
