= 1603 in Denmark =

- Decades: 1580s; 1590s; 1600s; 1610s; 1620s
- See also: Other events of 1603; List of years in Denmark

Events from the year 1603 in Denmark.

== Incumbents ==
- Monarch – Christian IV

== Events ==
- King Christian IV founds the fortified town of Kristianopel in Blekinge (then part of Denmark) to strengthen the border against Sweden.
- Denmark suffered a severe famine caused by multi-year crop failures from a "volcanic winter." The acute food shortage triggered soaring prices and deadly epidemics, leading to high mortality rates.

== Births ==
- 6 April – Simon Paulli, physician and naturalist (died 1680)
- 10 April – Christian, Prince-Elect of Denmark (died 1647 in Dresden)
- 8 December – Steen Beck, statesman and landholder (died 1648)

== Deaths ==
- 13 July – Axel Gyldenstierne, Governor-general of Norway (born c. 1542)
