= 1606 in Denmark =

- Decades: 1580s; 1590s; 1600s; 1610s; 1620s
- See also: Other events of 1606; List of years in Denmark

Events from the year 1606 in Denmark.

== Incumbents ==
- Monarch – Christian IV

== Events ==
- 20 March – Sorø Pharmacy is established in Sorø.

=== Undated ===
- The first part of Rosenborg Castle is constructed.
- Christian IV's 2nd Greenland Expedition is sent to Greenland under the command of Godske Lindenov.
- Christian IV embarks on a comprehensive upgrade of Copenhagen's fortifications which will last 20 years.
- The main building of Trods Katholm is constructed.

== Births ==
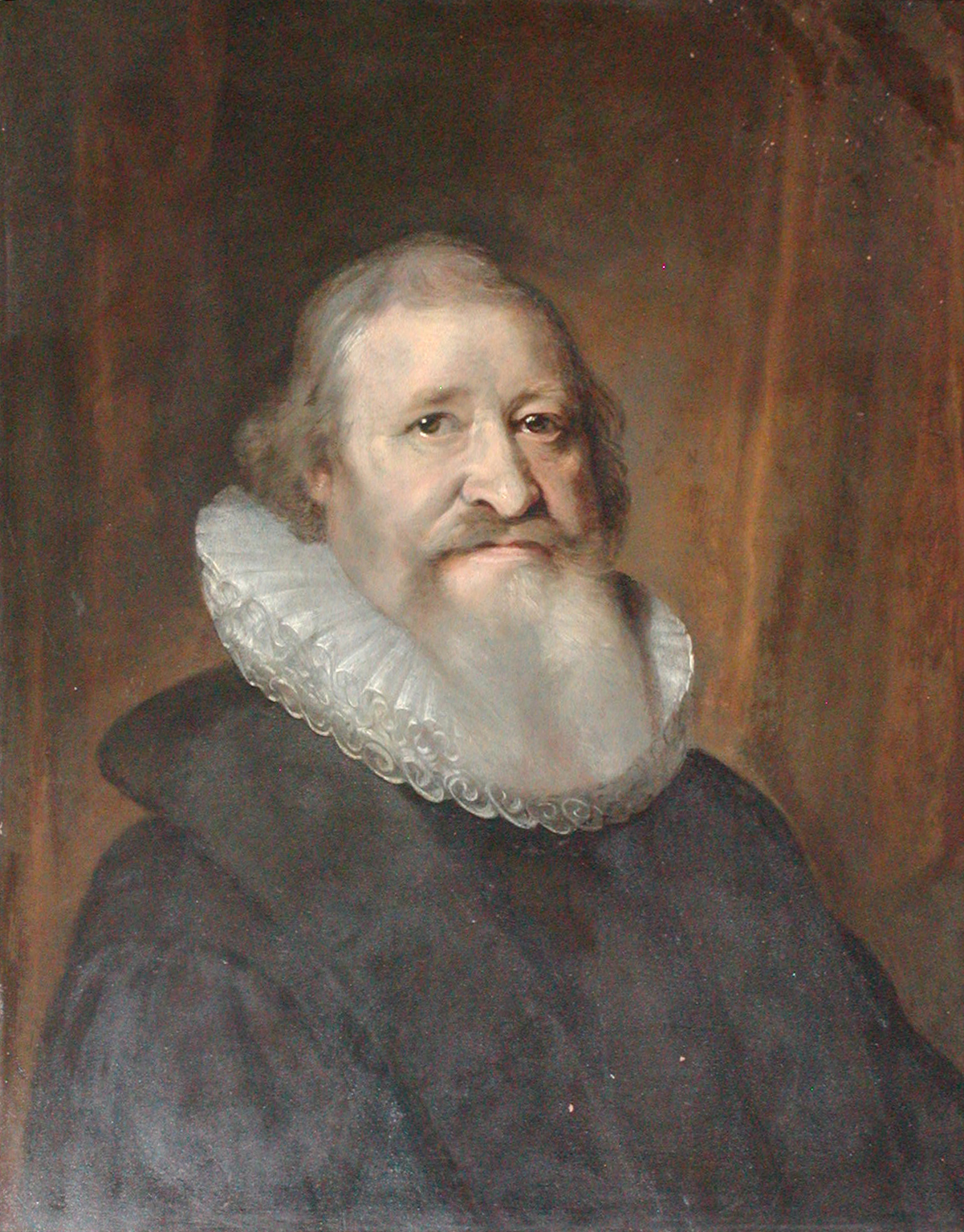
[[[Hans Svane

.]]

- 27 March – Hans Svane, statesman (died 1668)
- 10 July Corfitz Ulfeldt, statesman, and one of the most notorious traitors in Danish history (died 1664)

=== Full date missing ===
- Karen Sehested, court official and landowner (died 1672)
- Henrik Thott, fiefholder, army officer and government official (died c. 1676)
