= 1613 in Denmark =

- Decades: 1590s; 1600s; 1610s; 1620s; 1630s
- See also: Other events of 1613; List of years in Denmark

The following is a list of events that occurred in the year 1613 in Denmark.

== Incumbents ==
- Monarch – Christian IV

== Events ==
- 20 January – The Treaty of Knäred is signed, officially ending the Kalmar War.

=== Undated ===
- Ole Worm returns to Denmark joining the University of Copenhagen.

== Births ==
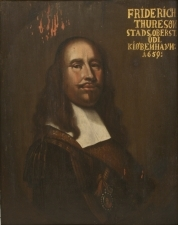
Frederik Thuresen-

- 8 December – Frederik Thuresen, businessman (died 1675)
