= 1618 in Denmark =

- Decades: 1590s; 1600s; 1610s; 1620s; 1630s
- See also: Other events of 1618; List of years in Denmark

Events from the year 1618 in Denmark.

== Incumbents ==
- Monarch – Christian IV

== Events ==
- November 16 – The first Danish voyage to India departs from Copenhagen under the command of Ove Giedde.
