= 1614 in Denmark =

- Decades: 1590s; 1600s; 1610s; 1620s; 1630s
- See also: Other events of 1614; List of years in Denmark

The following is a list of events that occurred in the year 1614 in Denmark.

== Incumbents ==
- Monarch – Christian IV

== Events ==
- 17 November – the Royal Danish Army army is established along with several infantry regiments, including: the Funen Life Regiment, Scanian Regiment, and Zealand Life Regiment.

Undated

- Kristianstad is founded by Christian IV in Scania, then a part of Denmark.

== Births ==
- 17 November – Peder Reedtz, judge (died 1674)

=== Full date missing ===
- Daniel Danielsen Knoff, politician (died 1687 in Norway)
