= 1615 in Denmark =

- Decades: 1590s; 1600s; 1610s; 1620s; 1630s
- See also: Other events of 1615; List of years in Denmark

Events from the year 1615 in Denmark.

== Incumbents ==
- Monarch – Christian IV

== Events ==
- 31 December – King Christian IV marries Kirsten Munk.

== Births ==
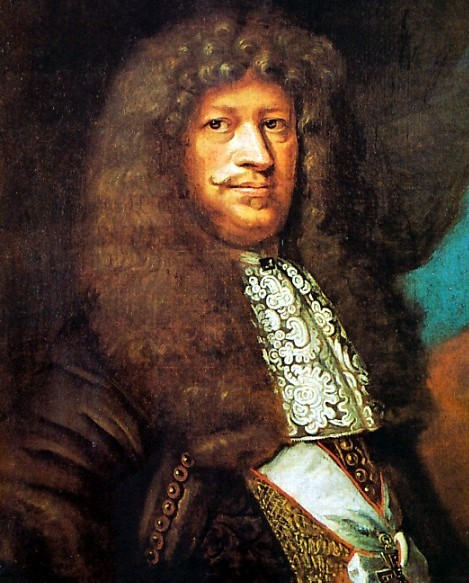
Ove Juul.

- 10 March – Hans Ulrik Gyldenløve, naval officer and illegitimate son of Christian IV (died 1645)
- 23 October – Ove Juul, vice Governor-general of Norway (died 1686)
- 31 October – Cornelius Pedersen Lerche, nobleman (died 1681)

== Deaths ==
- Jan Mendoses, pirate executed in Copenhagen
