= 1619 in Denmark =

- Decades: 1590s; 1600s; 1610s; 1620s; 1630s
- See also: Other events of 1619; List of years in Denmark

Events from the year 1619 in Denmark.

== Incumbents ==
- Monarch – Christian IV

== Events ==
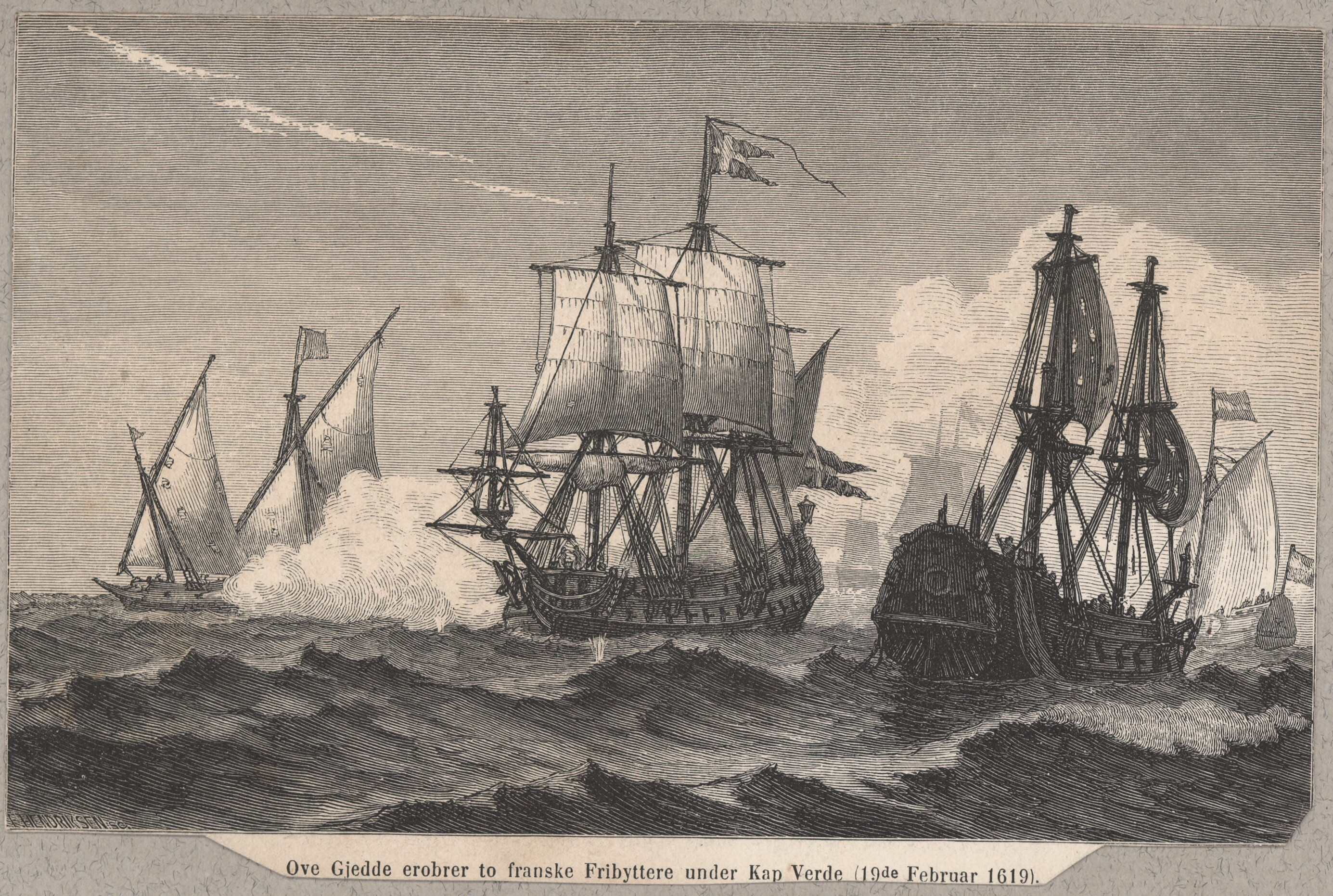
19 February: Ove Gjedde captures two French privateers at Cape Verde.

- 19 February – Ove Gjedde captures two French privateers off Cape Verde.
- 6 April – A royal decree states that everybody who builds a "good house" in Christianshavn will get a deed on the lots and several years of tax discounts.
- 9 May – King Christian IV sends out an expedition led by Jens Munk to find the North-West Passage. On board is also Rasmus Jensen, the first Lutheran cleric in Canada.
- 5 September – Church of Holmen is inaugurated in the former naval anchor forge in Copenhagen.

=== Undated ===
- An outbreak of plague hits Copenhagen, killing 7,000 people in the period 1619-20.
- Reinhold Timm is engaged as drawing teacher at Aorø Academy.

== Births ==
- 21 January – Anders Bording, poet and journalist (died 1677)
- 17 April – Birgitte Thott, translator, writer and feminist (died 1662)
- 20 September – Sophie Elisabeth Pentz, countess (died 1657)

Full date unknown

- Anne Palles, alleged witch (died 1693)

== Deaths ==
- 19 August – Jørgen Lunge, Rigsmarsk (born 1577)
- November – Jonas Charisius, physician, politician, and ambassador (born 1571)

Full date unknown

- Lorenz van Steenwinckel, architect (born 1585)
