= 1600 in Denmark =

- Decades: 1580s; 1590s; 1600s; 1610s; 1620s
- See also: Other events of 1600; List of years in Denmark

The following is a list of events that occurred in the year 1600 in Denmark.

== Incumbents ==
- Monarch – Christian IV

== events ==
=== Undated events ===
- A strange aerial phenomenon over the Aarslev meadows is witnessed by local peasants and documented by scholar Holger Rosenkrantz.

== Births ==
- 19 March – Anders Bille, Marshal of the Realm (died 1657)

Undated

- c. 1600 – Corfits Mogensen Ulfeldt, naval officer (died 1644)

== Deaths ==
- 11 March – Hans von Andorf, architect
- 23 May – Niels Hemmingsen, theologian (born 1513)
