= 1607 in Denmark =

- Decades: 1580s; 1590s; 1600s; 1610s; 1620s
- See also: Other events of 1607; List of years in Denmark

Events from the year 1607 in Denmark.

== Incumbents ==
- Monarch - Christian IV
- Steward of the Realm

== Births ==
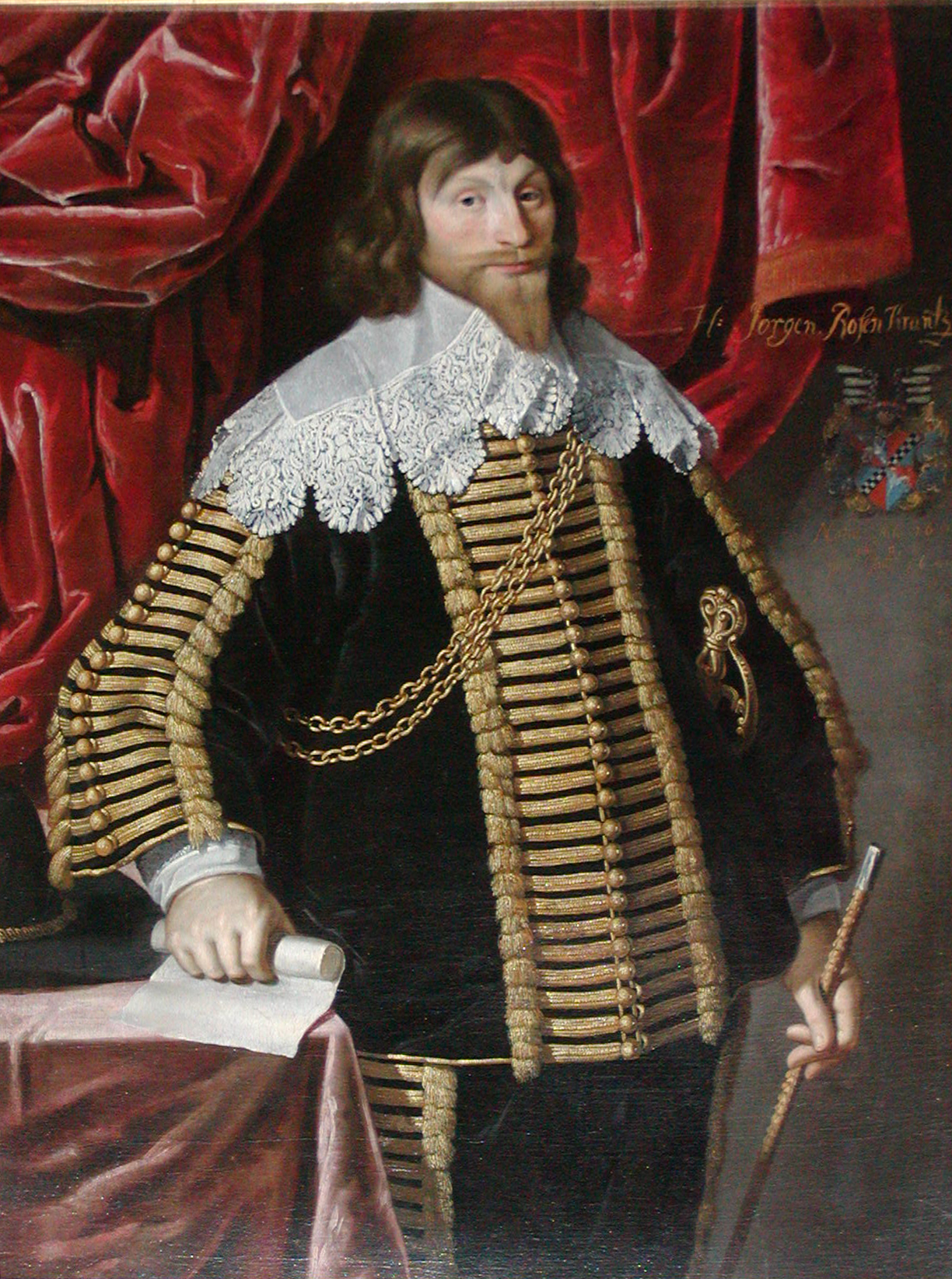
Jørgen Rosenkrantz

- 11 July – Jørgen Rosenkrantz, educator and county governor (died 1675)
- 10 December – Kjeld Stub, priest (died 1663)

== Deaths ==
- 14 May – Lauge Beck, landholder, judge and royal treasurer (born c. 1530)
