= 1617 in Denmark =

- Decades: 1590s; 1600s; 1610s; 1620s; 1630s
- See also: Other events of 1617; List of years in Denmark

The following is a list of events that occurred in the year 1617 in Denmark.

== Incumbents ==
- Monarch – Christian IV

== Events ==
- 12 October – The Witchcraft Act of 1617 (Danish: Trolddomsforordningen af 1617) is signed into law by Christian IV, leading to a surge in witch trials in Denmark from 1617 to 1625 referred to as The Great Witch Hunt.

Undated

- Glückstadt is founded by Christian IV in the Duchy of Holstein.
- Trinity Church begins construction in Kristianstad, then a part of the Kingdom of Denmark.

== Births ==
- 6 January – Christoffer Gabel, statesman (died 1673)
- 6 October – Vitus Bering, poet and historian (died 1675)
