= 1608 in Denmark =

- Decades: 1580s; 1590s; 1600s; 1610s; 1620s
- See also: Other events of 1608; List of years in Denmark

Events from the year 1608 in Denmark.

== Incumbents ==
- Monarch – Christian IV

== Events ==
=== Undated ===
- Rumors and accusations about sorcery began to spread in the town of Køge, starting what will eventually turn into the Køge Huskors witch trial.
- The privy Council and representatives of the Estates support the King in naming Prince Christian heir apparent.
- A corner bastion–some ten years later adapted into what is now known as Christian IV's Brewhouse – is constructed on Slotsholmen in Copenhagen.
- The Caritas Well is constructed on Gammeltorv in Copenhagen.
- Frederiksborg Castle in Hillerød is expanded with a new east wing (The Princess's Wing).

== Births ==
- 7 May – Peder Pedersen, merchant and burgermaster (died 1669)
- 28 October – Hans Schack, military officer (died 1676)

=== Full date missing ===
- Matthias Hermansen Kalthoff, gunsmith (died 1681)

== Deaths ==
- 30 January – Jon Jakobsen Venusinus, theologian, naturalist and historian (born c. 1558)
