= 1610 in Denmark =

- Decades: 1590s; 1600s; 1610s; 1620s; 1630s
- See also: Other events of 1610; List of years in Denmark

Events from the year 1610 in Denmark.

== Incumbents ==
- Monarch – Christian IV

== Events ==
- Christian, Prince-Elect of Denmark is publicly hailed in Denmark and Norway.

== Births ==
- 17 June – Birgitte Thott, writer and feminist scholar (died 1662)

Undated

- c. 1610 – Otto Pogwisch, government official (died 1684)
- c. 1610 — Svend Poulsen, Danish-Norwegian military commander (died c. 1680)

== Deaths ==
- Henrik Ramel, politician and ambassador
