= Siege of Kalmar =

1611 siege

- Part of the Kalmar War
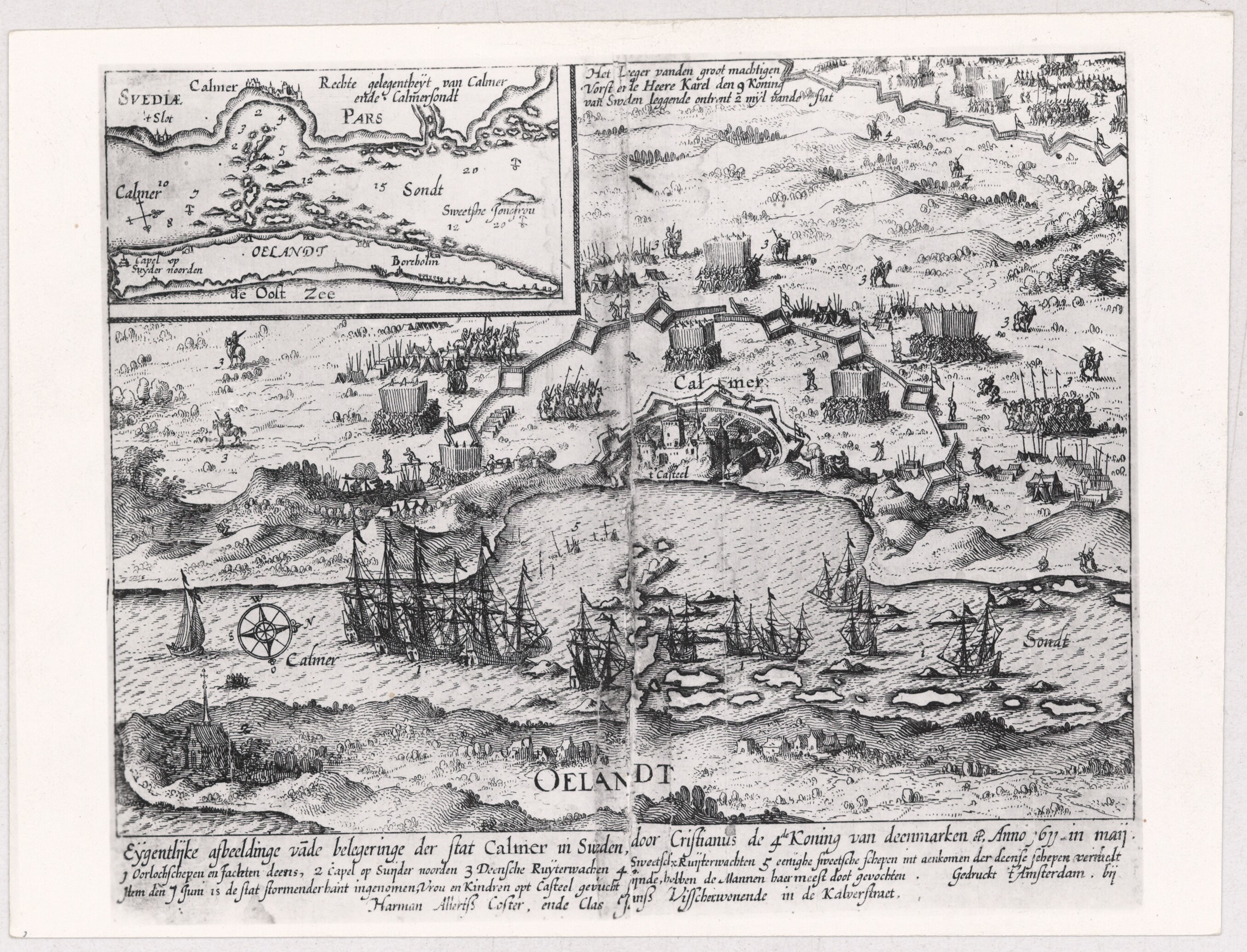
- Contemporary Dutch depiction of the siege
Date	May 3 – August 3, 1611
Location	Kalmar, Sweden 56°39′41″N 16°21′46″E
Result	Danish victory

Belligerents
(yes) Sweden	Denmark–Norway

Commanders and leaders
(Swedish Empire) Bo Bååt (Swedish Empire) Jakob Snakenborg (Swedish Empire) Peder Hammarskjöld	(Denmark–Norway) Christian IV (Denmark–Norway) Sven Sehested

Strength
770 Infantry; 100 cavalry 200–400 armed city residents	4,500 Infantry; 1,200 cavalry Later on 7,000 men

Casualties and losses
700 dead	200 dead

The siege of Kalmar occurred in 1611 during the Kalmar War and constituted the major part of an intensive conflict between Denmark–Norway and Sweden for control of the strategically important city of Kalmar and its castle. For centuries, Kalmar was, from a strategic point of view, considered 'to be the key to Sweden'. The country that was in charge of the city with its fortified castle would reign over the Kalmar Strait and have free access to the north, along the Swedish east coast towards Stockholm. From this southern fulcrum in Sweden, a land-based attack against Danish territory and a naval attack with the Swedish navy could have been made possible.

The battle of Kalmar occurred during the summer in the same year.

== Bibliography ==
- F.H. Jahn: Historie om Kalmarkrigen Köpenhamn, 1820 (in Danish)
- Axel Larsen: Kalmarkrigen: et Bidrag til de nordiske Riges Krigshistorie - efter trykte og utrykte kilder Köpenhamn, 1889 (in Danish)
- Jonas Hedborg: Kungl. artilleriet. Yngre vasatiden 1985 (in Swedish)
