= 1609 in Denmark =

- Decades: 1580s; 1590s; 1600s; 1610s; 1620s
- See also: Other events of 1609; List of years in Denmark

Events from the year 1609 in Denmark.

== Incumbents ==
- Monarch - Christian IV
- Steward of the Realm;

== Births ==
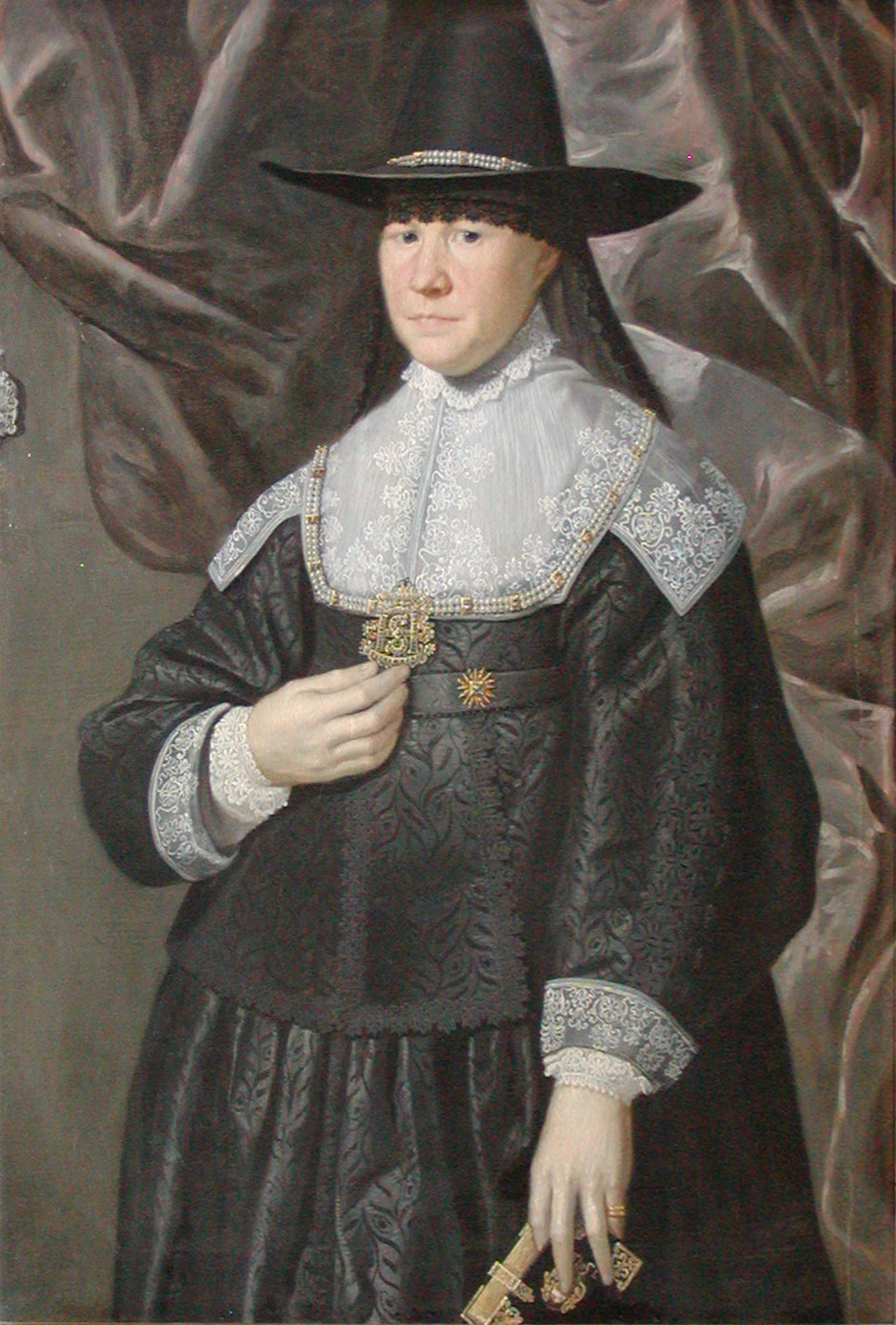
Anne Gøye.

- 18 March – Frederick III of Denmark, king of Denmark and Norway (died 1670)
- 23 August – Ove Skade, fiefholder, Supreme Court justice (died 1664)
- 14 October – Ernest Gunther I, Duke of Schleswig-Holstein-Sonderburg-Augustenburg (1689)
- 16 December – Anne Gøye, noblewoman and book collector (died 1681)

=== Full date missing ===
- Hannibal Sehested, statesman (died 1666)

== Deaths ==
- Arild Huitfeldt, historian (born 1536)
