= Christen Aagaard =

Danish poet (1616–1664)

Christen Lauritsen Aagaard (27 or 28 January 1616, in Viborg, Denmark – 5 February 1664, in Ribe) was a Danish poet. He studied from 1635 to 1639 in Copenhagen. Since 1647 he was professor of poetry at the University of Copenhagen. In 1651 he became rector and in 1658 lecturer in theology at Ribe, in Jutland and also preacher at Vester-Vedsted. Among other Latin poems, he wrote Threni Hyperborei [Lamentations of the North], published, in folio, in 1648, on the death of Christian IV, King of Denmark. Several of his pieces are inserted in the first volume of Rostgaard's Deliciae Poëtarum Danorum (Copenhagen 1693).

== Further works ==
- Laurus cimbrica, poema heroicum de Victoria Christiani IV adversum classem Sueco-Batavam die 16 maj 1664 (Copenhagen 1644)
- De Homagio Frederici III, Daniae et Norvegiae regis (Copenhagen 1660)

== See also ==
- Niels Aagaard, his brother
