= Niels Aagaard =

Danish poet, theologian, philosopher and writer

Niels Lauritsen Aagaard (1812— abt. 22 January 1857), was probably the brother of the poet Christen Aagaard, was professor at Sorø Academy, in Denmark, where he also occupied the office of librarian. He died in 1657, at the age of forty-five, and left behind him several philosophical and critical works, written in Latin, among which are, A Treatise on Subterraneous Fires; Dissertations on Tacitus; Observations on Ammianus Marcellinus; and a Vindication of the Style of the New Testament.

== See also ==
- Christen Aagaard
