= Anne Oldeland =

16th Century Danish woman

Anne Oldeland (died 21 February 1602) was a Danish noblewoman and landowner. She is known for the feud she had with the local representatives of the Danish church on Funen from 1561 to 1567.

She was born to Hans Oldeland and Sophie Munk and married the noble landowner Hans Norby til Uggerslevgård (d. 1565). From 1561, the couple was involved in a famous conflict with the Danish church through its local representatives, three parish vicars in succession of the Ugglerslev parish. They actively tried to stop the sermons by having the church doors locked to the vicar. The legal process was represented by her spouse, but she was the dominant party in the conflict. In 1567, she was forced to submit to the church.
