= Aalborghus =

Building in Aalborg, Denmark

Coordinates: 57°2′58″N 9°55′27″E

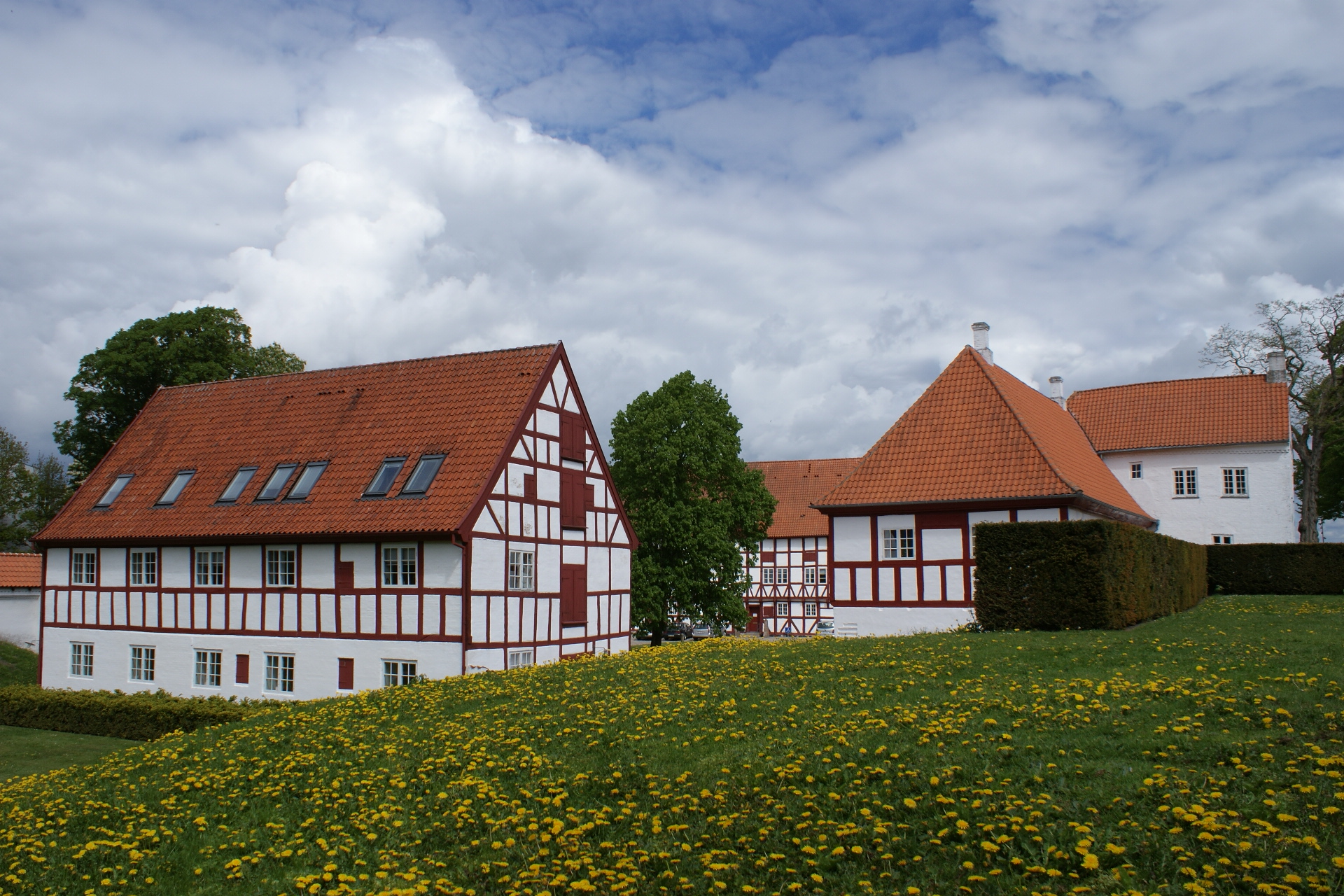
The castle as seen during a sunny day in 2011.

Aalborghus Castle (Danish: Aalborghus Slot) is a castle in Aalborg, Denmark. It is a half-timbered (bindingsværk) castle built by King Christian III from 1539 to around 1555 initially as a fortification.

A building had existed at the site before Christian III's castle. It stood south of the castle and is mentioned in the first documentation of Aalborghus, dating back to 1340. It was owned by Margrethe I and was the death place of King Hans in 1513 who died in a horse riding accident.

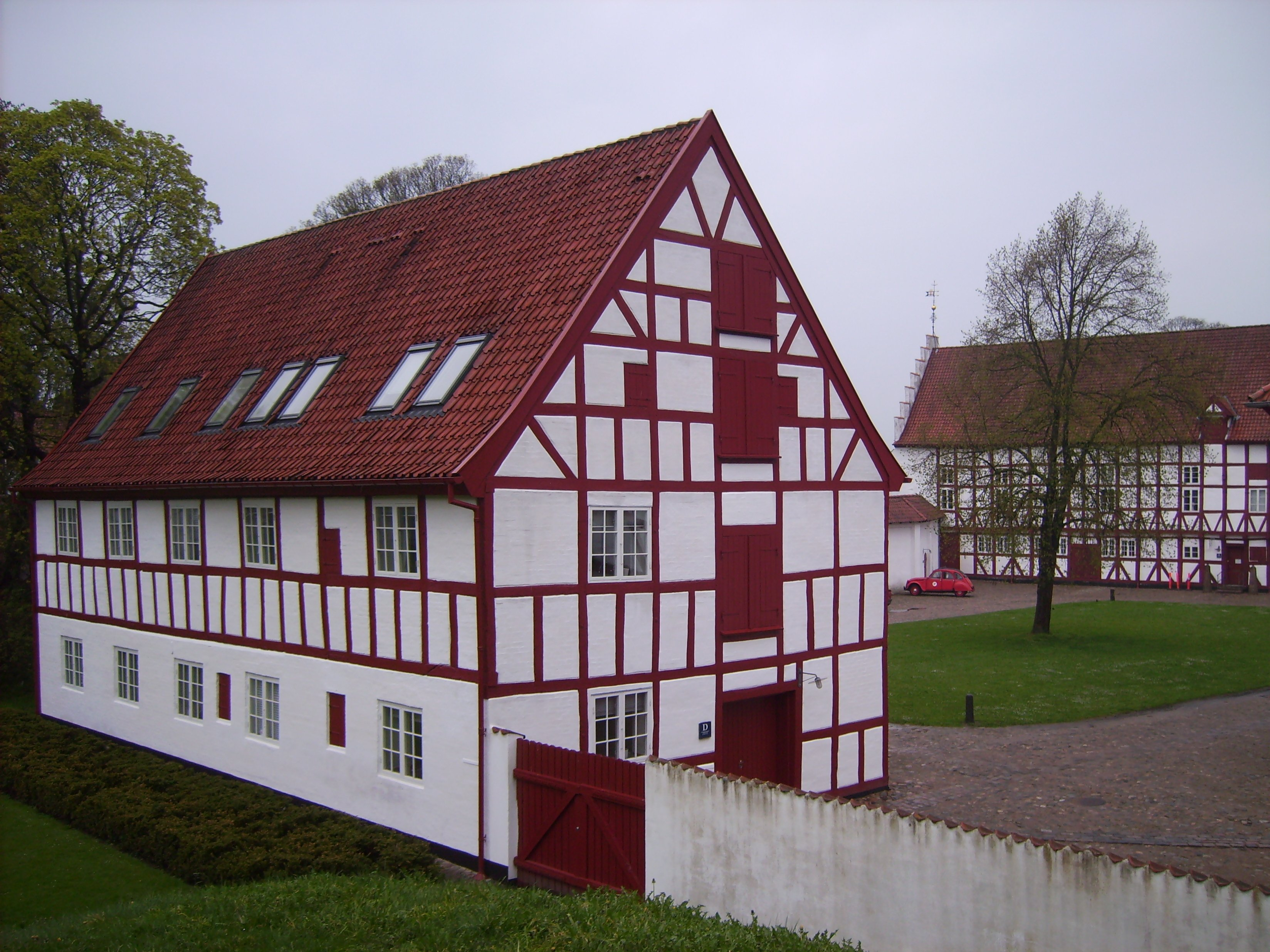
The castle Aalborghus in Aalborg, Denmark was built between 1539 and 1555.

King Frederik I had originally intended to destroy the initial building around 1530 and moving to a different site to convert Aalborg's Franciscan monastery into a castle. However he left the decision to his son Christian III, who later decided to demolish the original in 1539 and contracted the royal architect Morten Bussert to build a new fortified castle north of the old site, near the Limfjord. A barrier wall was built alongside the fjord, and later in 1633, King Christian IV built a north wing facing the port, which was used as a granary for the storage of food supplies such as grain. A western wing was built to the same effect later, holding other supplies such as meats and fish. In 1644, Aalborghus was besieged by Danish forces led by Vogn Vognsen, recapturing it from the Swedes who had captured it in January.

The south-facing wing was created between 1808 and 1809 but all that remains today of the original castle is the east wing.

Between 1954 and 1964 the old granaries underwent full renovation by the Royal Inspector of Listed Buildings, Leopold Teschl, who converted them into council offices.

== See also ==
- Ley tunnel

== Works cited ==
- Ørnbjerg, Jakob (2010). Slaget om Aalborg 1644 [Battle of Aalborg 1644] (PDF). Fra Himmerland og Kjær Herred (in Danish). Historisk samfund for Himmerland og Kjær Herred. ISSN 0107-9301.
