= Karen Roeds =

Karen Roeds (died 1620), was a Danish woman who was executed for witchcraft. She was one of the victims of the great Danish witch hunt of 1617–1625, and a typical example of those accused; almost all of the characteristics of her trial were typical of the trials during the witch hunt of 1617-1625.

== Background ==
In October 1617, the witchcraft act Trolddomsforordningen af 1617 was introduced in Danish law, which made witch persecutions much easier and which was accompanied with an instruction by the king to local authorities and parish vicars to make use of it by investigating any suspected sorcery in their parishes. This resulted in the outbreak of a witch panic and a witch hunt in Denmark lasting for eight years until 1625, the documentation of which are preserved from the region of Jylland.

Karen Roeds was a poor married woman from the peasantry in about sixty years of age, who had been reputed to be involved in witchcraft for many years and who appears to have been named a witch by an already accused "witch" under torture, all of which made her a typical representative of the people who were charged for witchcraft during the great Danish witch hunt of 1617-1625. Her spouse attempted to gather witnesses willing to testify to her defense, but failed because such testimonies would risk them to become incriminated as well, which was also typical.

== Trial ==
Roeds was put on trial in Ribe on 13 July 1620. As was customary in the Danish witch trials of 1617-25, when a suspect was put on trial, any one with any knowledge of potential witchcraft was invited to testify. She was accused of owning a wax doll given to her by a male lodger; the doll had been carried close to a woman who had then ritually given birth to it. Such dolls were common in Danish magic, and used as voodoo dolls do cause harmful magic on others. She admitted having owned such a doll but claimed that she had destroyed it. Secondly, she was accused of having caused a man to become ill and die after a conflict and an argument about money; the widow testified that her late spouse had become ill and died after an argument with Roeds. Thirdly, she was accused of having caused a boy to become ill after he had harassed her grandchild for being the grandchild of a witch. This granddaughter was questioned and was made to confirm that she had once claimed that Roeds had taken her to a Witches' Sabbath. A woman who was married to Karen Roeds former stepfather claimed that Roeds' had made her husband impotent. A fisherman named Anders testified that he had a conflict with Roeds, and that she had sent him on an errand to a wizard, and that the travel there, which normally took 24 hours, had only taken five. A number of other people accused her of having caused illness and death by use of witchcraft.

== Verdict and execution ==
Karen Roeds denied all accusations except the one about the wax doll and the story of her granddaughter: she claimed that she had owned a wax doll once but destroyed it, and when it came to the story of her granddaughter, she refused to comment at all. This, in combination with the fact that so many had testified against her and no one on her behalf, resulted in a conviction. After conviction, she was subjected to torture, which made her confess her own guilt and name twelve accomplices, all of them either already arrested or executed, or members of the poorest of society.

She was sentenced to be burned alive at the stake on 4 August 1620.
