= Anders Foss =

Norwegian bishop

Anders Foss (1543 – 25 January 1607) was a Norwegian clergyman and Bishop of Bergen.

Anders Michaelsen Foss was born in Denmark. He was the son of Catharina Tausen (ca 1535–1592), eldest daughter from the first marriage of Hans Tausen (1494–1561), Bishop of the Diocese of Ribe . Foss took his magister degree in divinity during 1564 in Copenhagen. He was employed as rector of the convent school at Antvorskov Kloster on Zealand . After 1570, he was parish priest at Stege Church on the island of Møn. He served as Lutheran Bishop in Bergen stift from 1583 until he died in 1607.

Religious titles
Preceded by Jens Pedersen Schjelderup	Bishop of Bjørgvin; 1583–1607	Succeeded by Anders Mikkelsen Kolding
