= Østerå River =

River in Denmark

Coordinates: 57°N 9.9°E

Østerå River ("East Stream"; also Kjærs Mølleå) is a Danish waterway located in the northern reaches of tunnel valley between Viborg and Aalborg. It measures approximately 15 kilometres (9 mi) long. Its original outlet was at the center of Aalborg where it functioned as a harbor, providing a water supply and power source. Aalborg grew up around Østerå and Versterå (West Stream), two wide-mouthed streams, which flowed into the Limfjord, providing access to shipping. Østerå served as a harbour for light ships until the second half of the 19th century. Though the river was piped in the late 1800s to bypass the city center, its original course is noted in place names such as Østerå, Aagade and Mølleplads.
