= Ingeborg Skeel =

Danish noblewoman and county sheriff (c. 1545–1604)

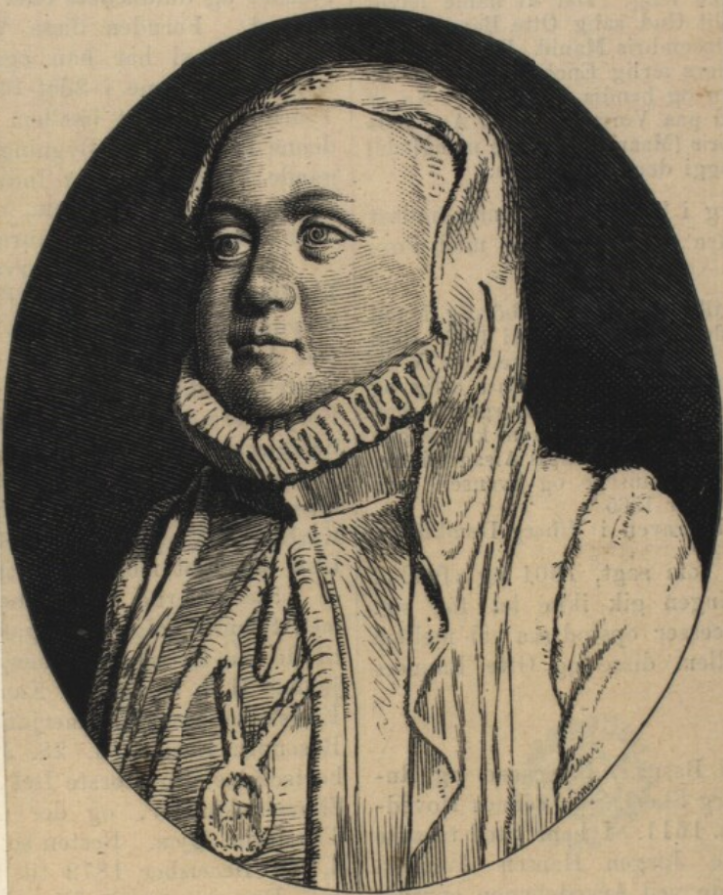
Ingeborg Skeel

Ingeborg Skeel (c. 1545 – 17 October 1604) was a Danish noblewoman, a major land owner and a county sheriff in the Vendsyssel region of northern Jutland, Denmark. She resided at Voergaard, a large estate which she expanded into a fine Renaissance castle between 1588 and 1591. A skilled businesswoman, she personally managed her estates and held several lifelong endowments. In her own day, she had an infamous reputation for greed and cruelty but there is no historical evidence for any of the rumours associated with her name.

== Biography ==
Ingeborg Skeel was born at Nygaard between Vejle and Kolding, the daughter of Niels Skeel (1480–1561) and Karen Globsdatter Krabbe (–1586). Her elder brother, Hans Skeel (1530–1565), was killed in the Battle of Axtorna in 1565, and her younger sister, Dorte Skeel (1547–1578), died in childbirth in 1578. On 31 August 1560, at Nygaard and in the presence of King Frederick II, Ingeborg Skeel was married to Otte Eriksen Banner, the son of former Rigsmarsk Erik Eriksen Banner and Mette Rosenkrantz. This brought Ingeborg Skeel to the far north of Jutland where her new husband owned Asdal in Vendsyssel.

In 1578, after several years of negotiations, Ingeborg Skeel and her mother acquired the large Voergaard estate from the Crown in exchange for Nygaard. The estate received status as a local judicial unit, Voer Birk, a so-called birkeret, for the parishes of Voer, Albæk og Skæve. In 1586, after she had become a widow, Skeel carried out an extension of Voergaard, possibly with the assistance of master builder and sculptor Philip Brandin.

Skeel was an industrious woman. She seems to have personally managed her estate and her holdings were regularly expanded through new acquisitions. Voergaard alone comprised more than 300 farms. Otte Banner and Ingeborg Skeel were granted ownership of Sejlstrup for life and after Banner's death in 1575 Skeel held it alone. From 1586, she was also granted lifelong ownership of Amtofte in Thy and Strekhals on Mors.

She was very active in trade with grain and other goods. In 1587 citizens of Aalborg complained that she was guilty of unauthorized trade in the town's market rights (so-called "landprang"), and that she kept a tent at markets, selling German beer and other items. As was often the case with strong and independent women of the time, Skeel was met with various accusations of greed, cruelty, and even witchcraft and being in a pact with the devil. There is no historical evidence for any of the rumours associated with her name.

Skeel was involved in several philanthropic efforts during her lifetime. She restored and partly refurnished the churches which belonged to Voergaard and Asdal. The tower of Voer Church was built by her and her husband according to an inscription in the church. She also financed the limewash frescos in Skæve Church. In 1588 she established a hospital in Sæby, although it had to close following her death due to lack of a signature from her husband on a letter of gift. In her old age she took two orphaned children of noble descent into her care.

She died on 17 October 1604 at Voergaard.

== Gallery ==
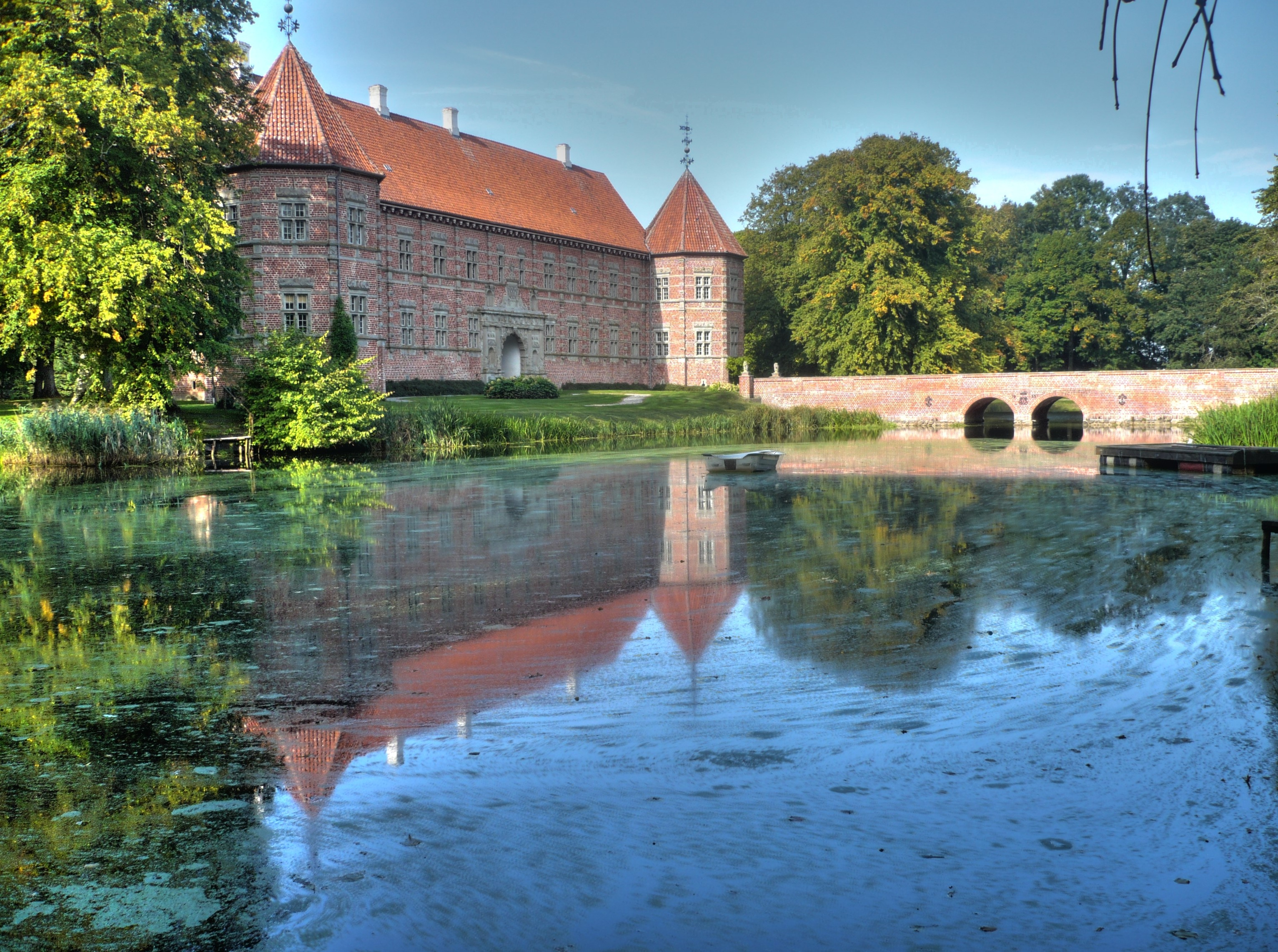
Voergaard, Ingeborg Skeel's estate

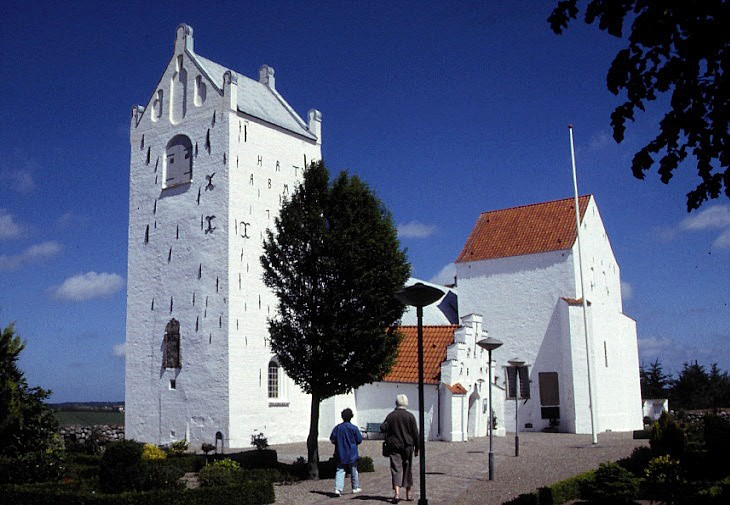
Voer Church

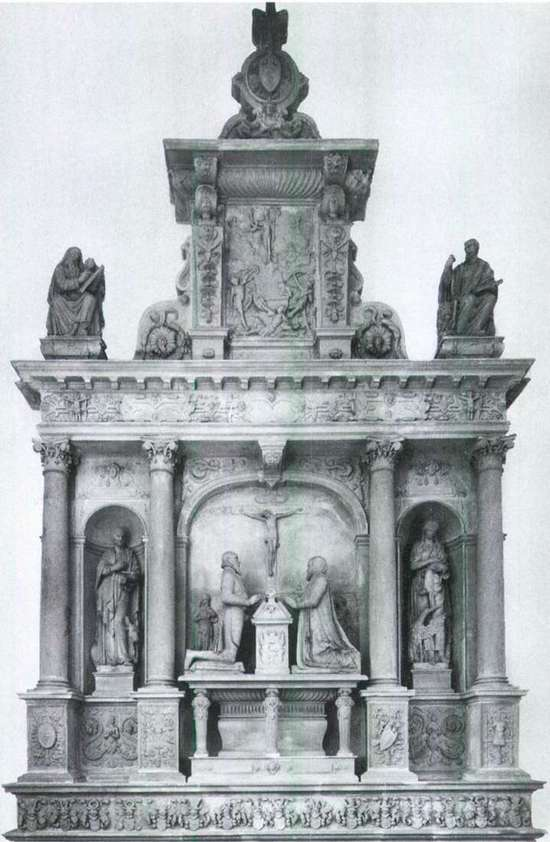
Memorial sculpture in Voer Church, depicting Ingeborg Skeel and her husband, Otto Banner, kneeling before a crucifix.
