= Voergaard Castle =

Manor house in Brønderslev Municipality, Denmark

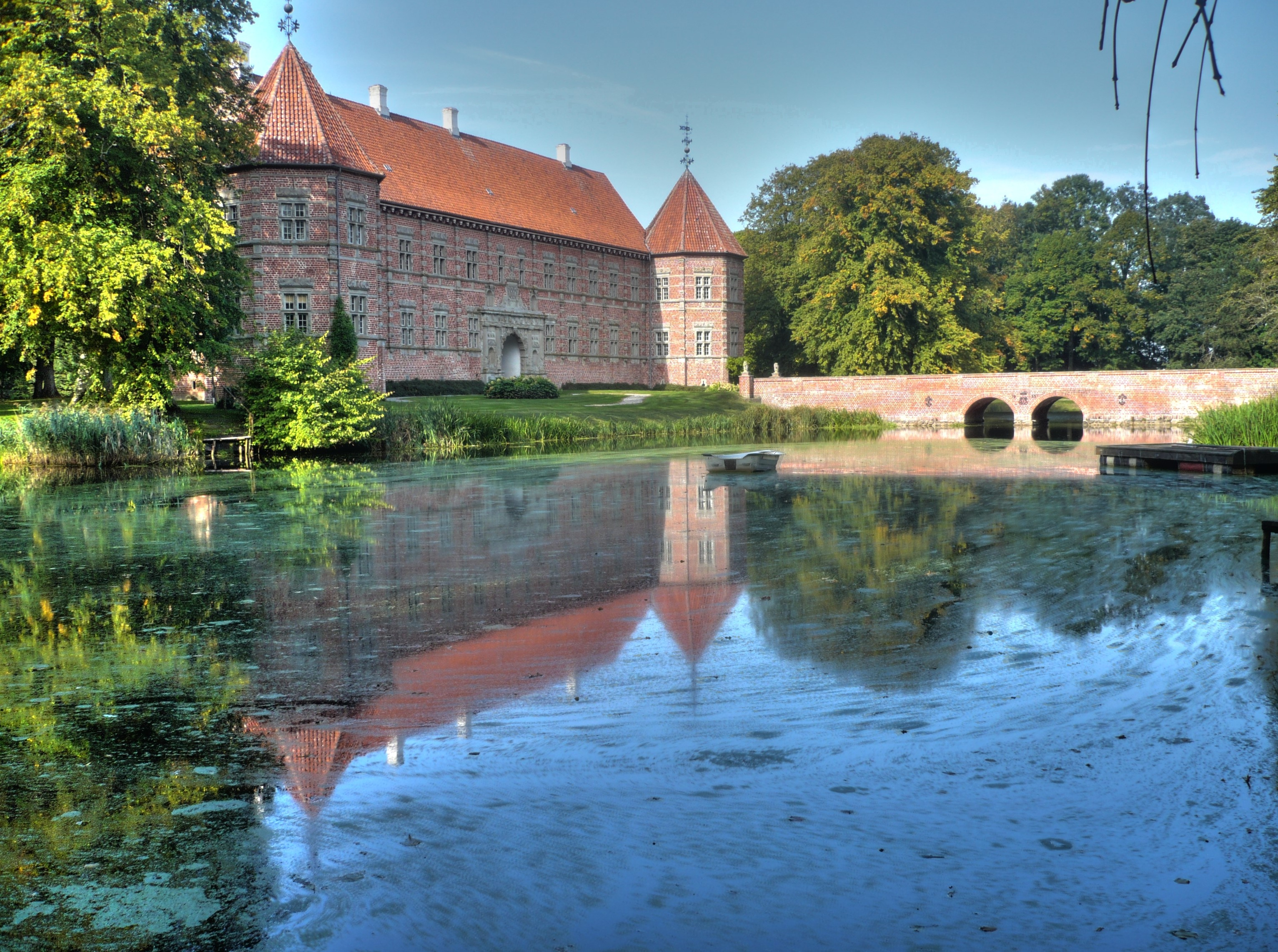
- The east wing and bridge
- Interactive map of the Voergaard Castle area

General information
- Architectural style: Renaissance
- Location: Brønderslev Municipality, Denmark
- Coordinates: 57.2425°N 10.3354°E
- Construction started: 1520
- Completed: 1588

Design and construction
- Architect: Philip Brandin

Website
- https://www.voergaardslot.dk/

Voergaard Castle (Danish: Voergaard Slot) is a moated Renaissance manor house located 10 km north of Dronninglund on the North Jutland peninsula in north-western Denmark. It is open to the public and houses a significant art collection.

== History ==
=== Early history ===
Voergaard's recorded history goes back to 1481. At the outbreak of the Count's Feud it was owned by Stygge Krumpen, Bishop of Børglum, taken by Skipper Clement's army of peasants and then, after the Reformation, confiscated by the Crown in 1536.

=== Ingeborg Skeel's castle ===
In 1578, King Frederick II ceded the property to Karen Krabbe in exchange for Nygaard, an estate located between Vejle and Kolding. Krabbe's daughter, Ingeborg Skeel, took over the property from her mother and carried out an expansion which was completed in 1588.

Over the following two centuries, Voergaard changed hands many times. Much of the land was sold.

=== Scavenius era ===
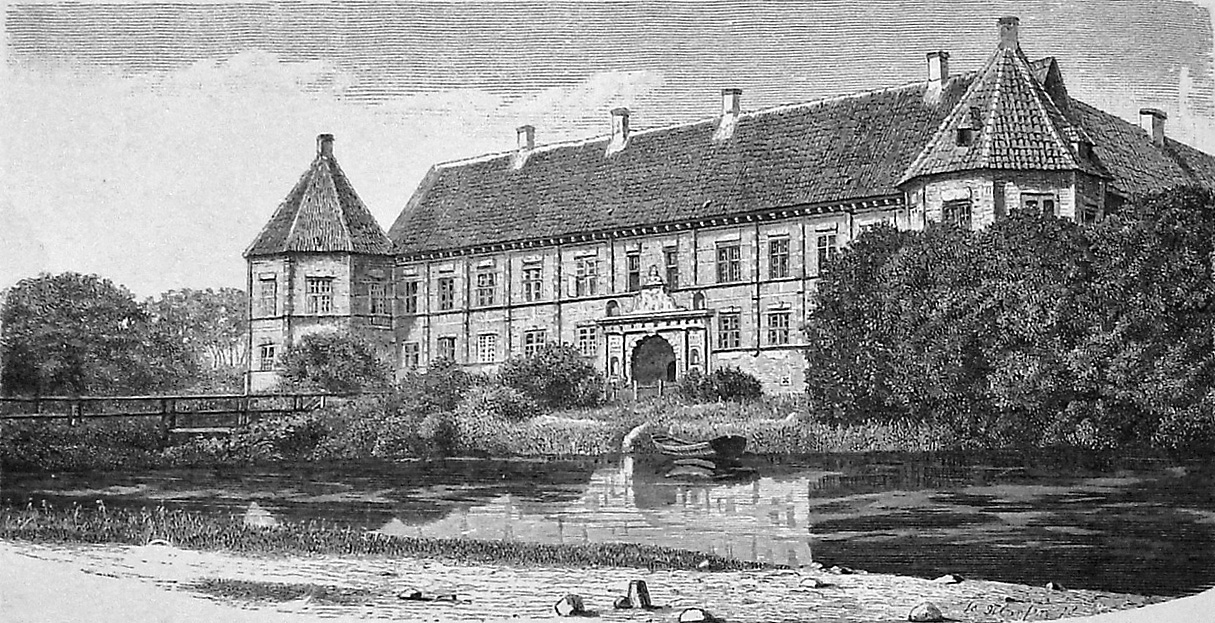
Voergaard in 1884

In 1872 it was purchased by Peder Brønnum Scavenius, a politician and land owner, who re-acquired much of the land which had previously been sold. At the time of his death in 1914, the estate covered 1,944.4 ha of land, making it one of the largest in Denmark at the time. The next owner was his son, Erik Scavenius, Danish Prime Minister during World War II, who owned Voergaard from 1914 to 1945.

=== An art venue ===
In 1955 Voergaard was acquired by Ejnar Oberbech-Clausen, a Dane who had lived in France since 1906 where he had become a count through his marriage with Marie Henriette Chenu-Lafitte, the widow of his former employer, and an Imperial Count in the Holy Roman Empire. Chenu-Lafitte was the daughter of Jules-Émile Péan, one of the great French surgeons of the 19th century, and owned an extensive art collection which originated both from her father and deceased husband.

The couple owned several châteaus in the area around Bordeaux but after his wife's death, in an air raid in 1941, Oberbech-Clausen moved to Paris and later decided to return to his native Denmark. He acquired Voergaard and, with approval from the French state, brought 12 train cars of art with him back to Denmark. He undertook a comprehensive and costly restoration of the castle which went on for several years. After his death in 1963, the castle and collections were passed to a foundation and opened to the public.

== Architecture ==
Voergaard is a two-winged, L-shaped castle built in red brick in the Renaissance style. The east wing is flanked by two octagonal corner towers and penetrated by a gateway. Its sandstone portal was a gift from King Frederick II and originally created for Frederiksborg Castle.

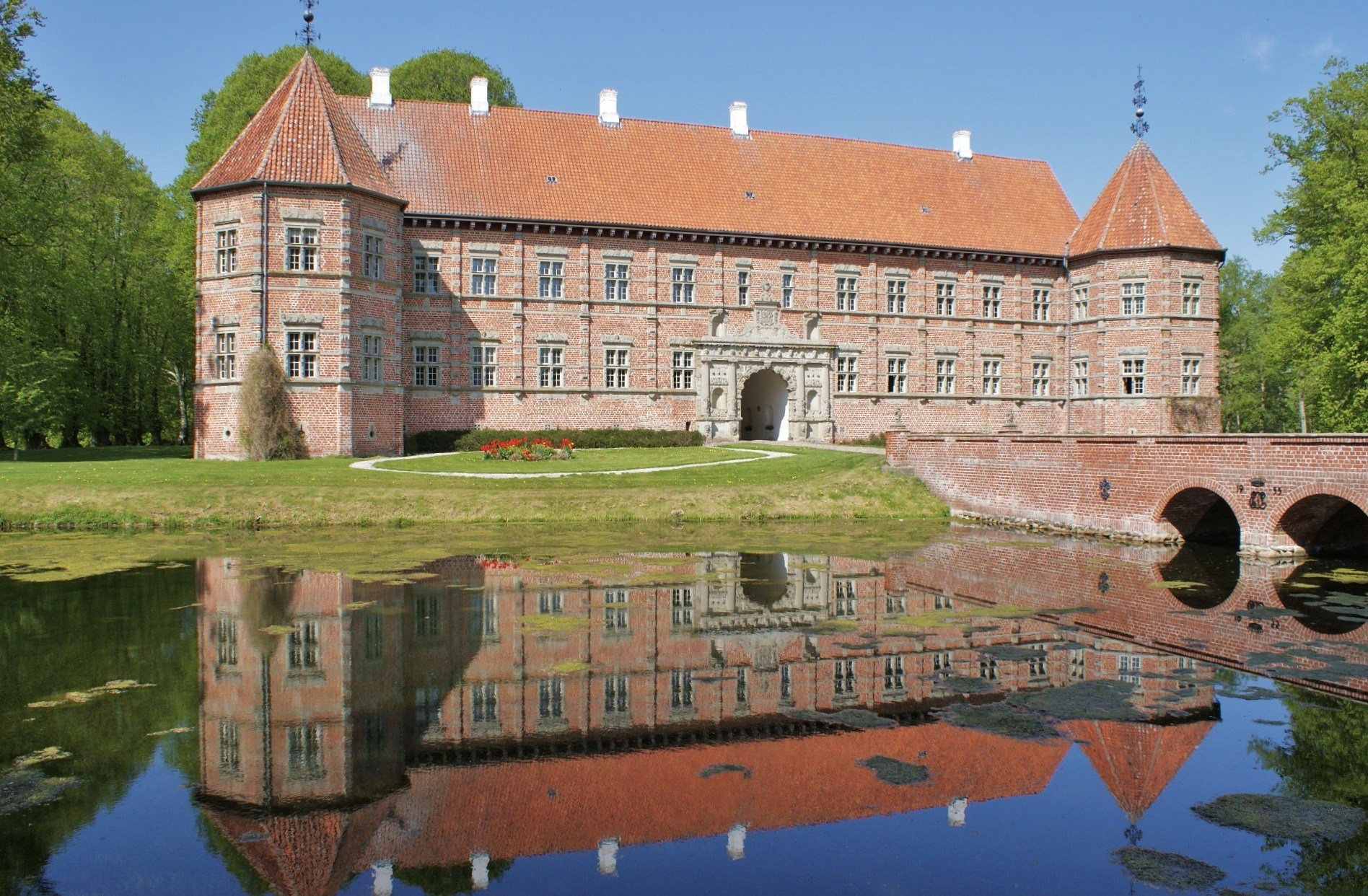
The east wing

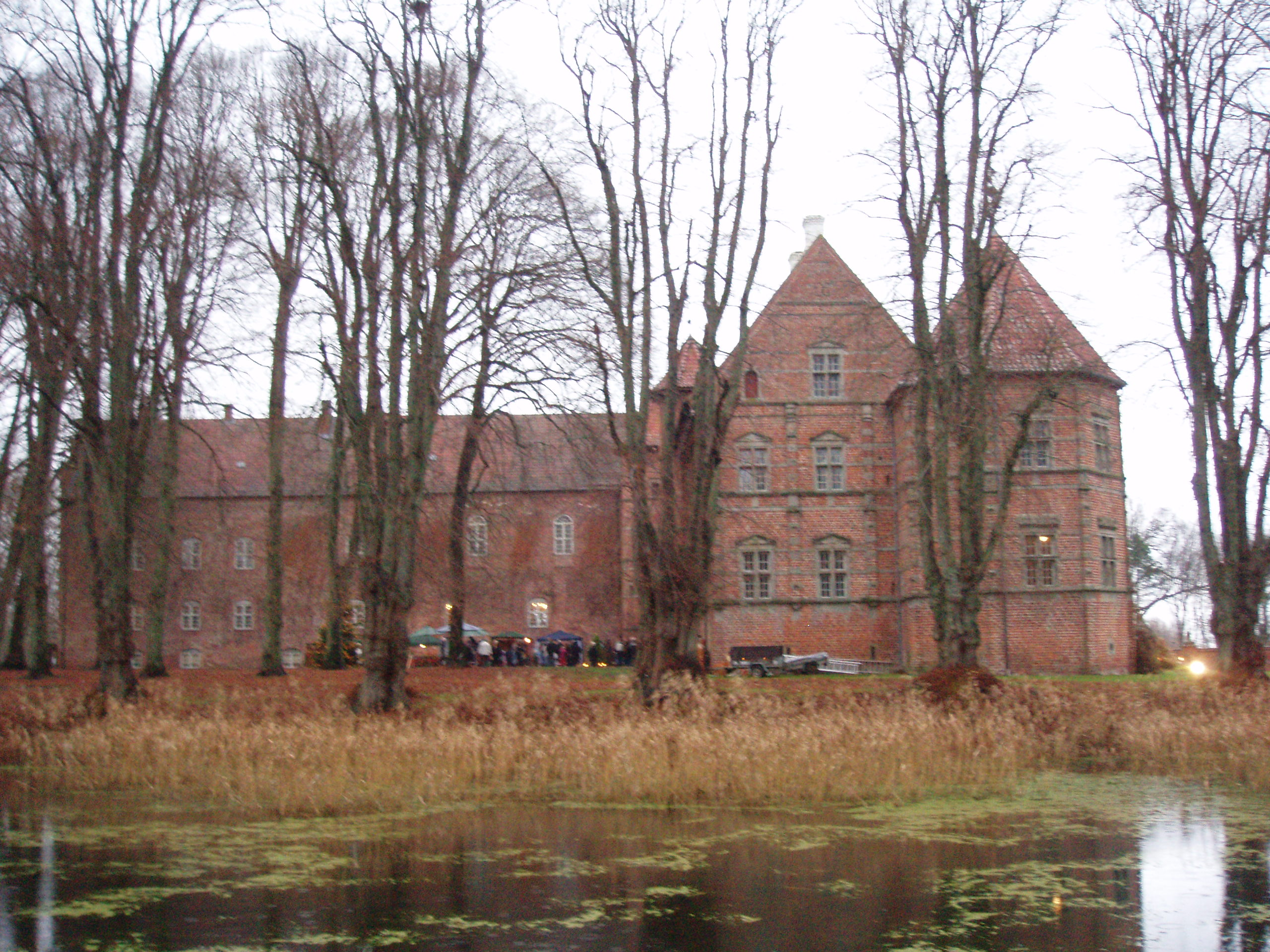
The north tower and gable of the east wing viewed from the north

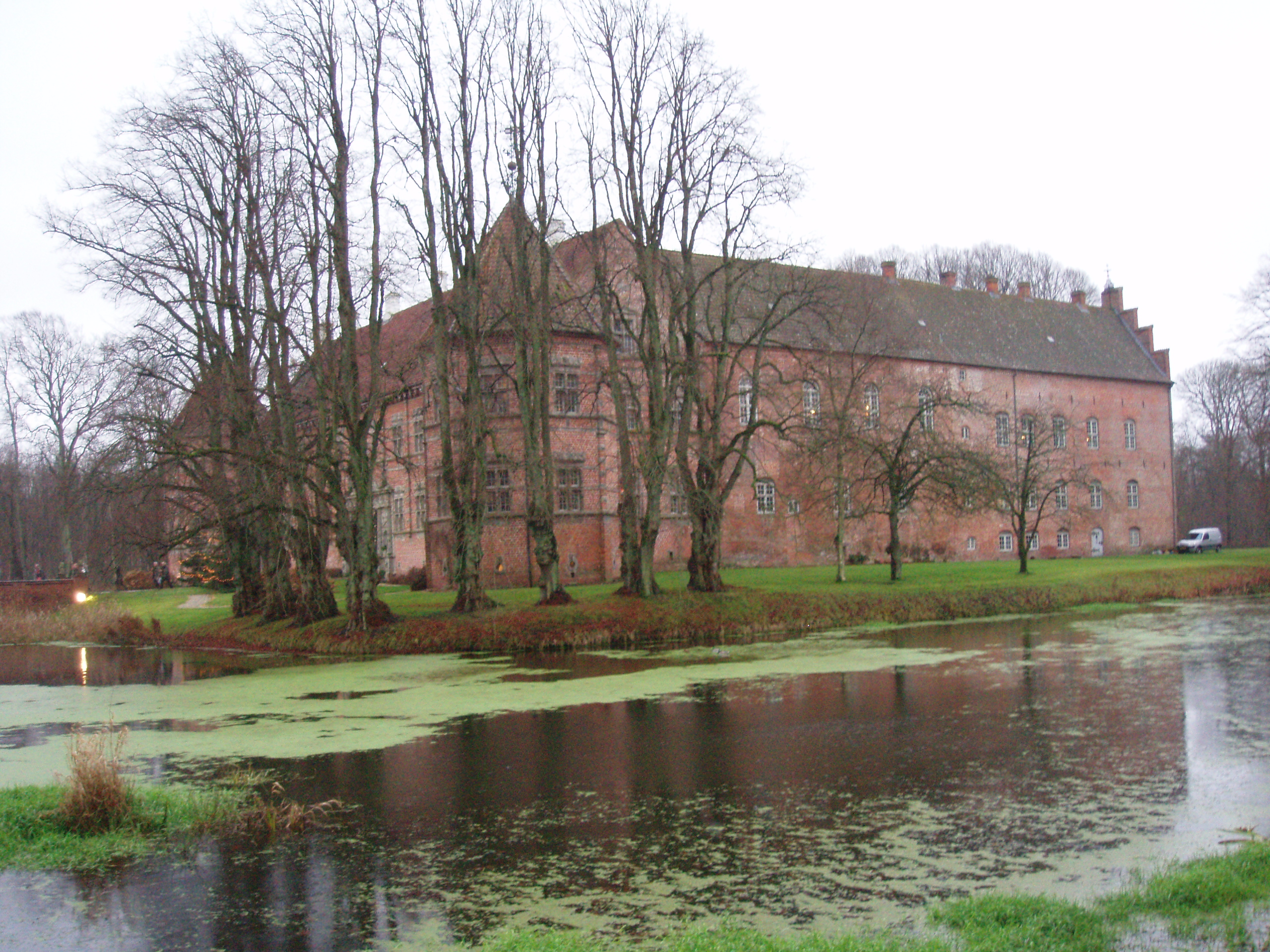
The north wing

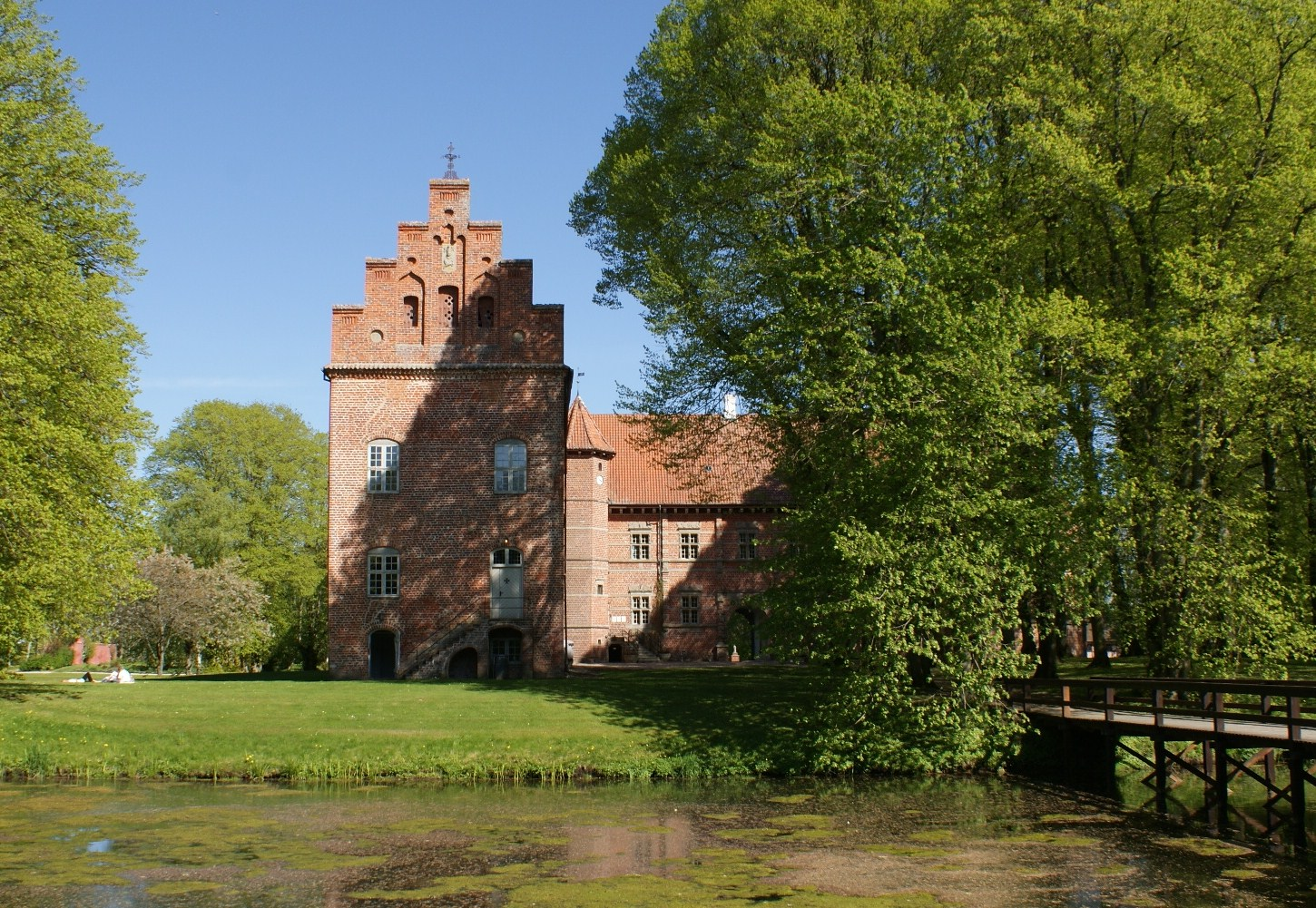
The gable of the north wing

== Art collection ==
The art collection contains works attributed to Francisco Goya, Peter Paul Rubens, Raphael, El Greco, Watteau and Frans Hals.

The furniture includes pieces which have belonged to Louis XIV and Louis XVI.

== Park ==
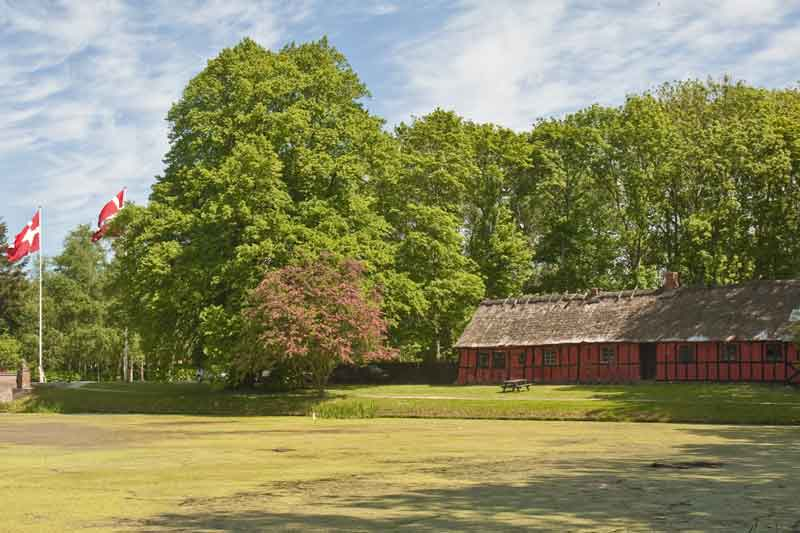
The building used by Voer Birk

The large park was originally laid out in 1768. In 1955 it was re-designed in the French style. Buildings in the grounds include a half-timbered building which in the 18th and 19th century was used by Voer Birk, a manor court where people who had committed local misdemeanors and petty crimes would be dealt with
