= 1664 in Denmark =

- Decades: 1640s; 1650s; 1660s; 1670s; 1680s
- See also: Other events of 1664; List of years in Denmark

Events from the year 1664 in Denmark.

== Incumbents ==
- Monarch - Frederick III

== Events ==
- 22 April - The fortified town Frederiksodde is renamed Fredericia.

Undated

- Kommercekollegiet is established but later dissolved in the late 1680s before being reestablished in 1704.
- Adriaen Foly, painter /died 1701)

== Culture ==
=== Architecture ===
- Schackenborg Castle is constructed.
- Tødovre Church s constructed.

== Births ==
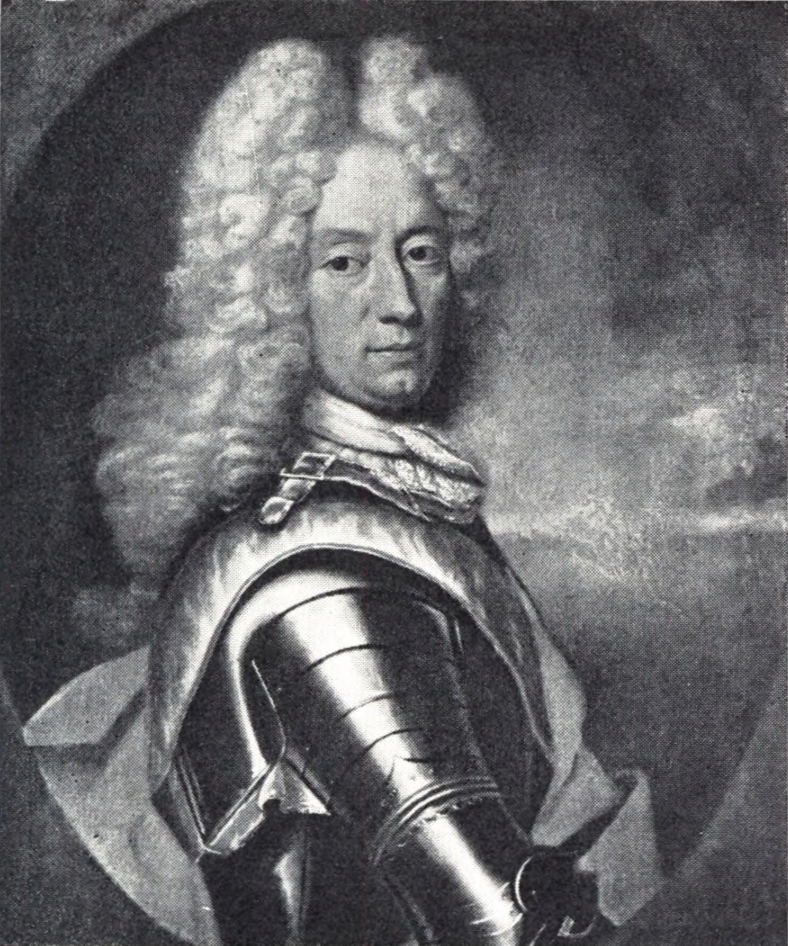
Christen Thomesen Sehested,

- 3 February - Jens Bircherod, bishop (died 1720)
- 12 August – Christian Vind, government official /died 1712)
- 24 August – Christen Thomesen Sehested, admiral (died 1736)
- 14 October – Just Juel, naval officer (died 1715)

== Deaths ==
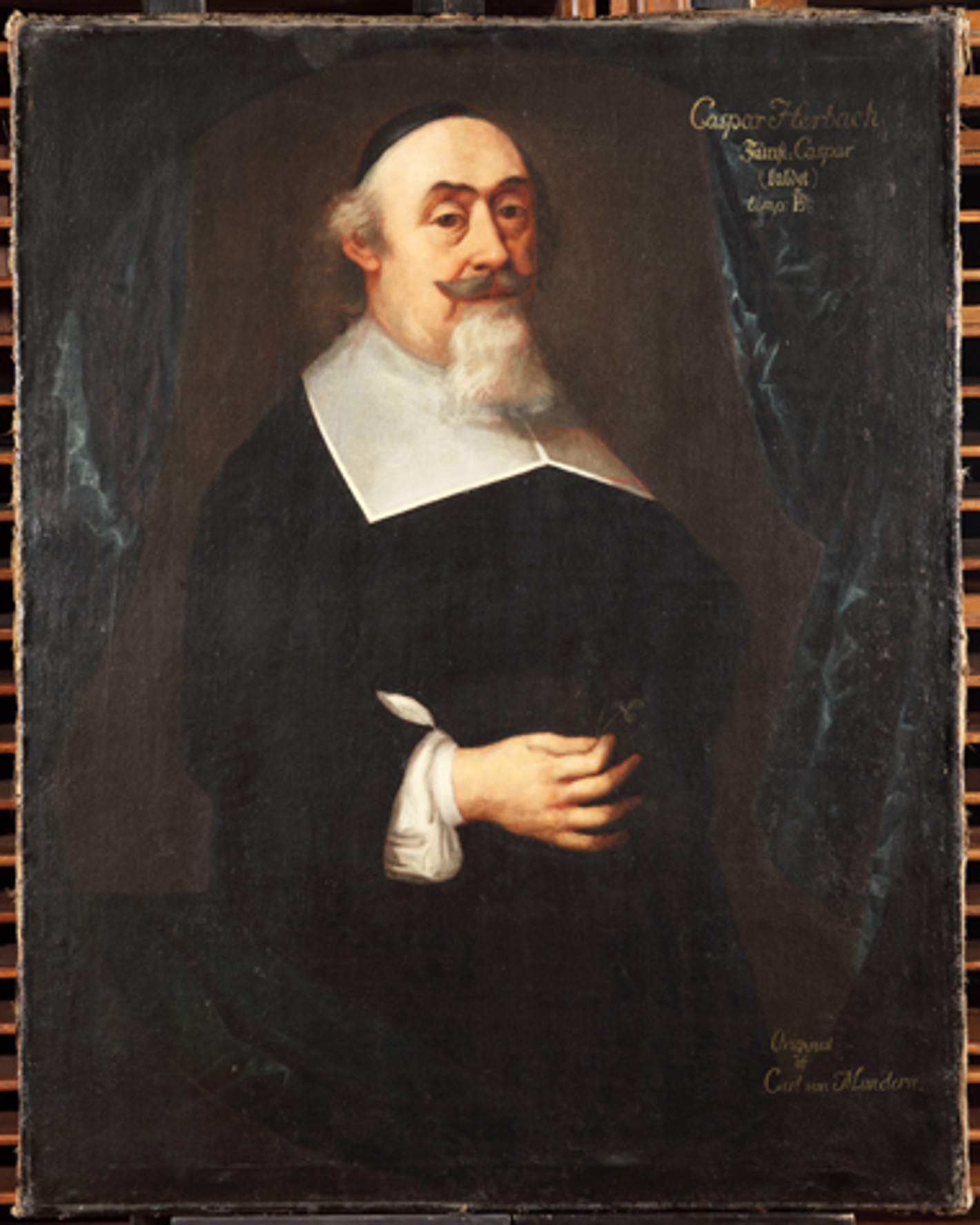
Caspar Herbach-

- 5 February – Christen Aagaard, poet (born 1616)
- 19 October – Ove Skade, fiefholder, Supreme Court justice (born 1609)
- 18 October – Caspar Herbach, court goldsmith, court cabinetmaker, alchemist (born 1600 in Saxony)
