= Knabrostræde 28 =

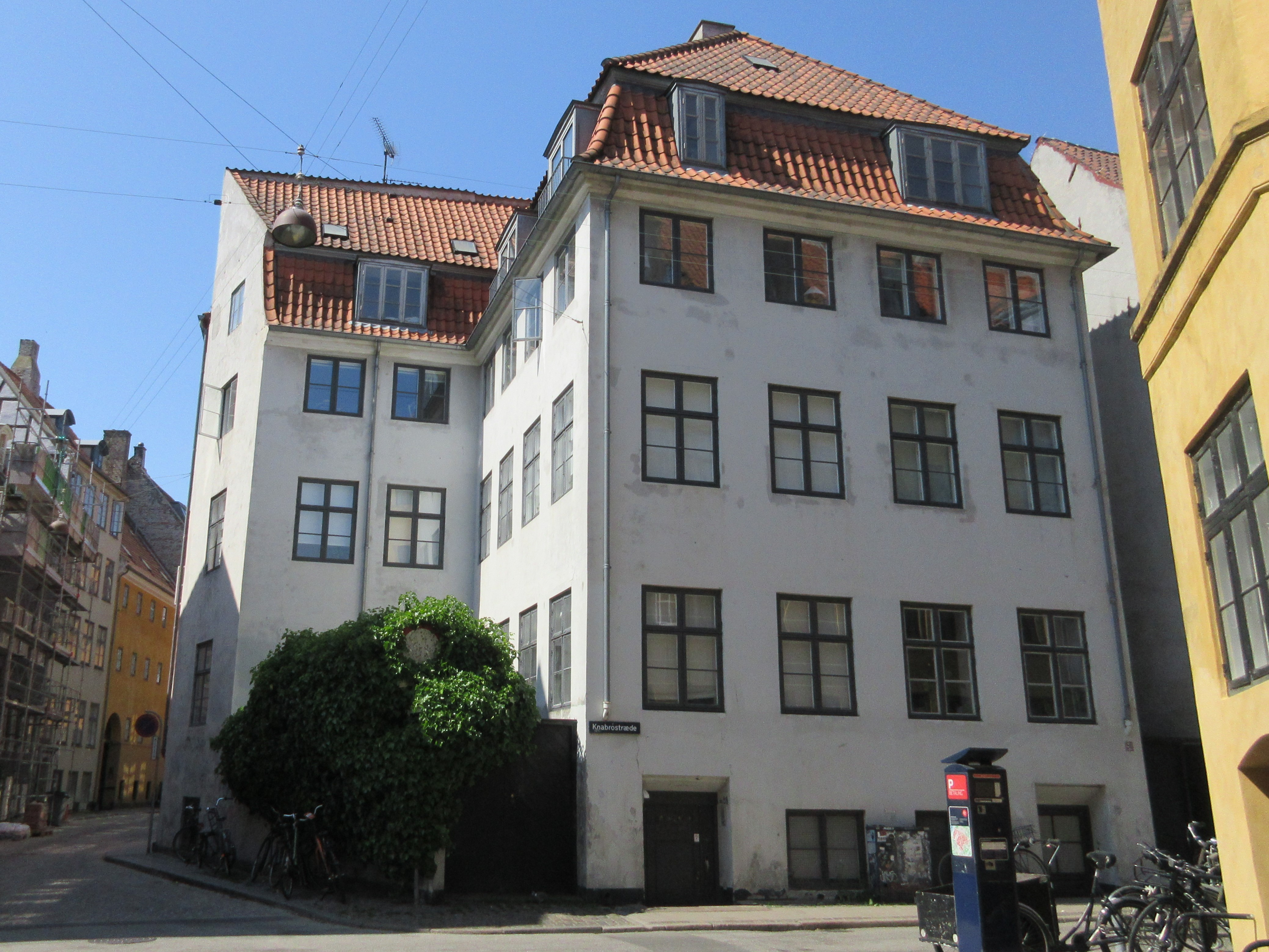
- Interactive map of the Knabrostræde 28 area

General information
- Location: Copenhagen, Denmark
- Coordinates: 55°40′36.23″N 12°34′33.31″E
- Completed: c. 1730

Knabrostræde 28 is an 18th-century property situated at the corner of Knabrostræde and Magstræde, close to Gammel Strand in the Old Town of Copenhagen, Denmark. It was constructed as part of the rebuilding of the city following the Copenhagen Fire of 1728. It was listed in the Danish registry of protected buildings and places in 1945.

== History ==
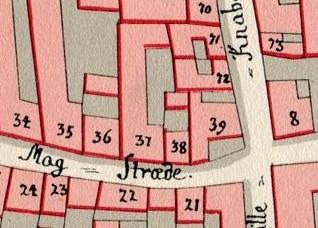
No. 39 and 49 seen on a detail from Christian Gedde's map of Snaren's Quarter, 1757.

=== 17th and 18th centuries ===
The property was listed as No. 45 in Snaren's Quarter (Snarens Kvarter) in Copenhagen's first cadastre of 1689. It was at that time owned by merchant Hermann II von Lengerken (1639-1702). He resided in the building with his wife Elisabeth née Holst (1665–1718) and their four daughters. Their daughter Elisabeth von Lengerken was married to Abraham Kløcker. She was the mother of Herman Lengerken Kløcker. The property was later destroyed in the Copenhagen Fire of 1728, together with most of the other buildings in the area. The current building on the site was constructed in approximately 1730.

The property was listed as No. 39 in the new cadastre of 1756. It was at that time owned by konsumtionsskriver Arre Pedersen Fischer.

=== Peter Poulsen and his family ===
The property was prior to the 1787 census acquired by Peder Poulsen, He served as manager of Hovedmagasinet at Holmen. At the time of the 1787 census, Poulsen's property was home to three households. Poulsen resided in his building with his wife Johanne Sofie Koch, their two children (aged four and seven), an office boy from Holmen, two maids, two lodgers and one of the lodger's servant. Katrine Magrethe Koch, a48-year-old widow, resided in the building with one maid. Niels Pedersen, a grocer (spækhøker), resided in the building with his wife Maren Jens Datter and their three children (aged two to 11).

Poulsen's property was just saved from the flames during the Cioenhaggen Fire of 1795. The buildings on the other side of the street were thus destroyed by the fire. At the time of the 1801 census, Poulsen's property was home to three households. Peter Poulsen resided in the building with his wife, two children, the widow Cathrine Margretha Esmarch and two maids. Niels Olivarius (1752-1828), a bookkeeper, resided in the building with his wife Sophie Hedevig Olivarius (née Mohr, 1752–1725) and one maid. Niels Andersen, a beer seller (øktapper), resided in the building with his wife Friderica Lovise Andersen and three lodgers.

The property was listed as No. 28 in the new cadastre of 1806. It was at that time still owned by Poulsen. The daughter Petronelle was on 21 May 1802 married to the naval officer Johan Henrik August von Kohl (1769–1820). He would later serve as commandant of Christiansø. The marriage was already dissolved 26.March 1813. Petronelle Poulsen was later married to Frederik Christian Plum (1788-1844), a merchant and owner of Cathrinedal on Møn.

=== Later history ===
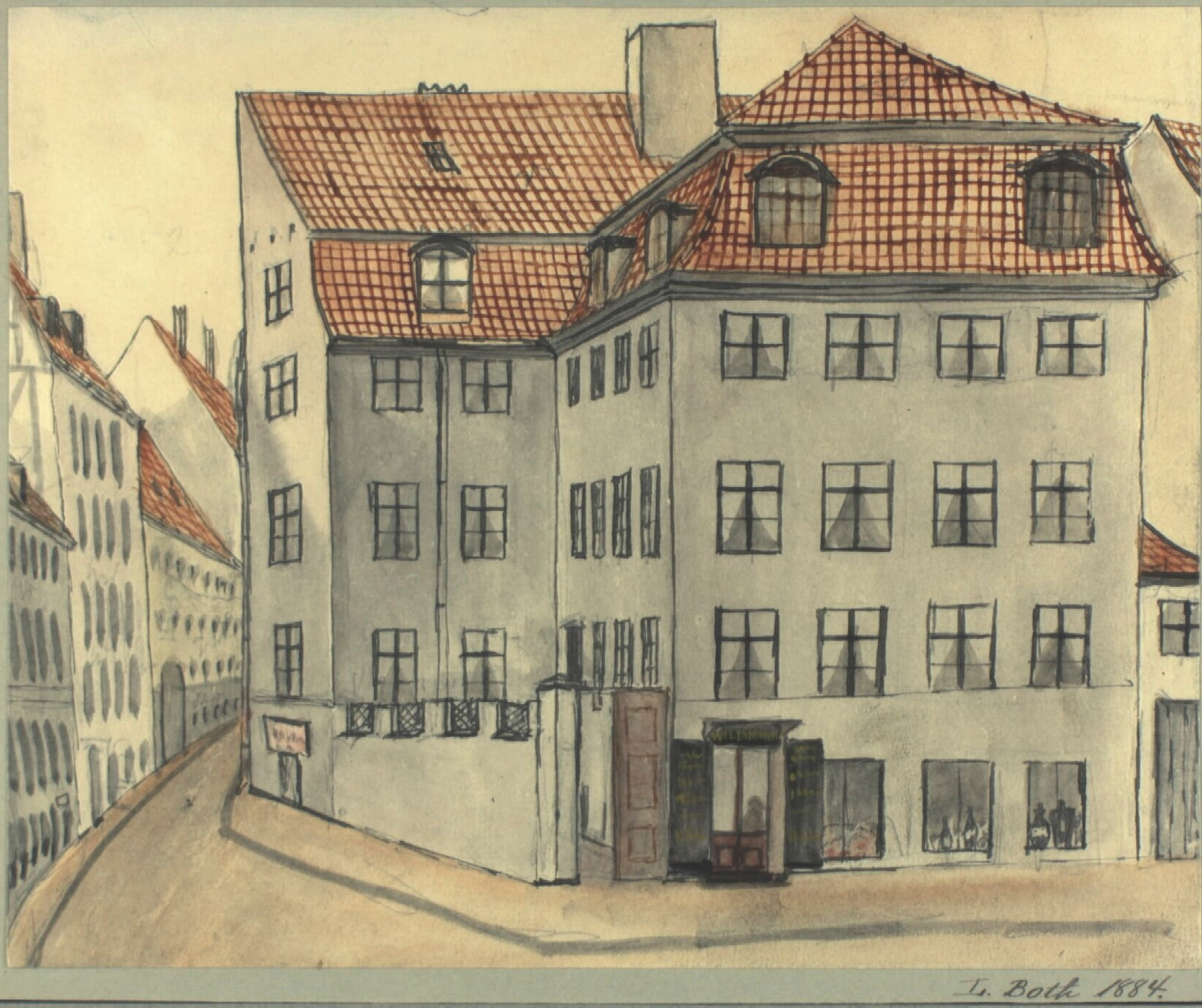
Drawing of the building by Ludvig Both.

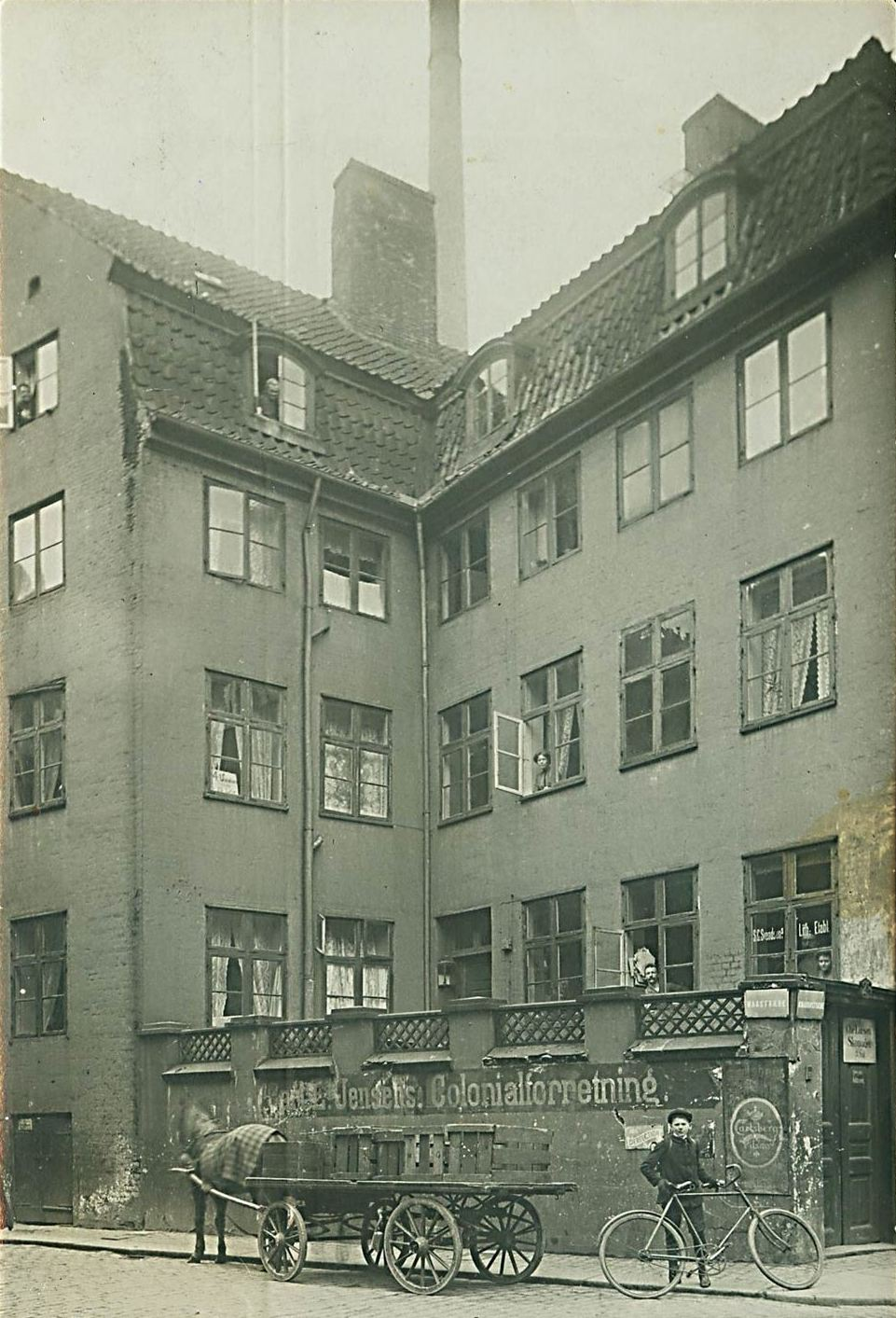
Carl E. Jensens grocery shop and shoemaker Chr. Larsen.

At the time of the 1840 census, No. 28 was home to 18 residents in three households. Ane Marie Tüchsen, a 56-year-old widow with a pension from the Danish Asiatic Company, resided on the first floor with her three children (aged 22 to 28), a six-year-old lodger (son of a bailiff in Mariager) and one maid. Johan Adolph Toft, a grocer (urtekræmmer) and wine merchantm resided on the second floor with two clerks, a housekeeper (widow) and her three children (aged one to 13), one male servant and two maids. Christian Georg Jensen, a grocer (urtekræmmer), resided in the basement with one employee (urtekræmmersvend).

At the time of the 1845 census, No. 28 was home to two households. Johan Adolph Top, an agent, resided on the first floor with his wife Christina Sonja Top, their three children (aged six to 18), a clerk and a maid. Christian Jens Jensen, another grocer (urtekræmmer), resided on the second floor with his wife Sonja Amalie Jensen, an apprentice, a lodger, a male servant and a maid.

Caroline Christiane Top had by 1850 become a widow. She resided on the ground floor with her three children (aged 11 to 23) and the visitor Henriette Cammann. Carl Emil Christensen, an assistant pastor, resided in another dwelling with his wife Wilhelmine Marie (née Christensen) and one maid. Christen Christensen, a chief engineer at Kongens Bryghus, resided on the second floor with his wife Marie (née Albrechtsen) and their six children (aged 19 to 29). Hans Jensen, a workman (and soldier), resided on the third floor with his wife Anna Maria (née Erichs Datter) and their two sons (aged one and seven). Jokum Martinus August Bendz, a grocer (ortekræmmer), resided in the basement with an apprentice.

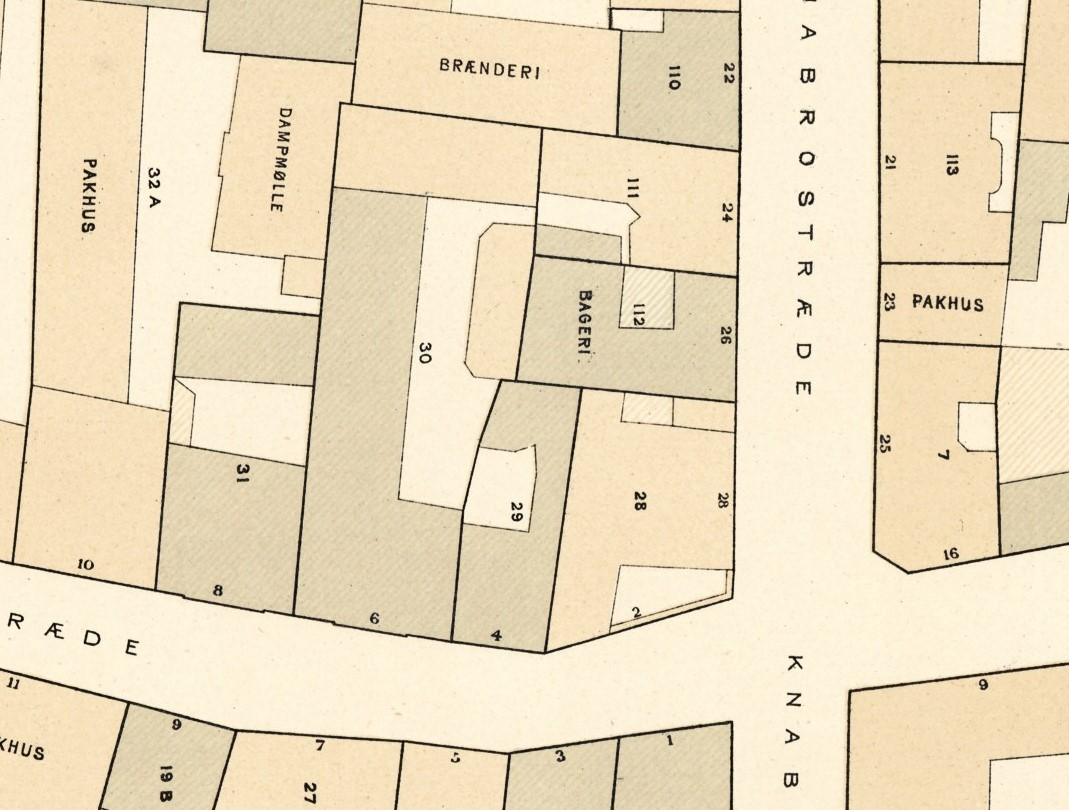
Knabrostræde 28 seen on a detail from Berggreen's cadastral map of Snaren's Quarter, 1884.

At the time of the 1860 census, No. 28 was home to 26 residents. Wilhelm Julius Topp, a courier at the Hygæa society, resided in one of the two ground floor apartments with his wife Ane Margrethe Dorthea née Kellerup. Emil Haral Binzer, a grocer (urtekræmmer), resided in the other ground floor apartment with one maid. Anthon Lemvigh, former owner of Hallebygård at Holbæk, resided on the first floor with his wife Juliane (née Bech), their two children (aged 15 and 21) and one maid. Mette Marie Hansted (née Schadorff), wife of merchant Lauritz Emil Hansted )1910-1989), resided on the second floor with her four children (aged eight to 15). Niels Hansen, a coachman, resided on the third dloor with his wife Else Kjerstine Nissen and their three children (aged one to sic), two unmarried sisters in the 20s, two male servants and one maid.

Carl E. Jensens Colonialforretning, a grocery shop, was around the turn of the century based in the building. I Chr. Larsen, a shoemaker, was also based in the building at that time.

== Architecture ==
Knabrostrlde 28 consists of two attached wings, ome om Knabrostræde and one in Magstærd, both with both with a hable fronting the street. The space in front of the building at the corner is closed off from the street by a wall.The Knabrostræde wing is topped by a hipped Mansard roof clad in red tile. The Magstræde wing is topped by a pitched red tile roof.

== Today ==
The property is today owned by E/F Knabrostræde 28,

== Gallery ==
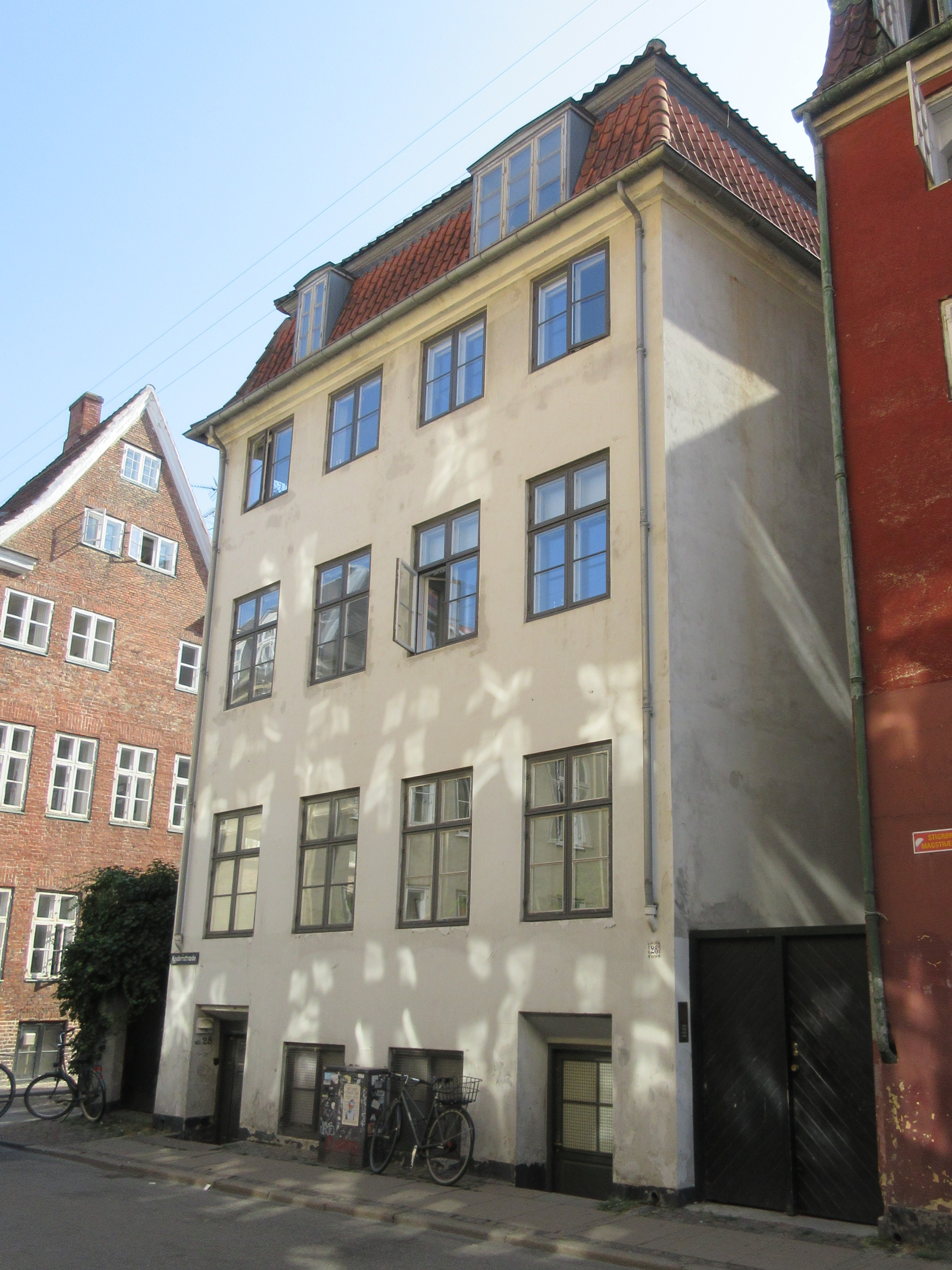
The building seen from Knabrostræde
