= 1730 in Denmark =

- Decades: 1710s; 1720s; 1730s; 1740s; 1750s
- See also: Other events of 1730; List of years in Denmark

Events from the year 1730 in Denmark.

== Incumbents ==
- Monarch – Frederick IV (until 12 October), Christian VI
- Grand Chancellor – Ulrik Adolf Holstein (until 17 October)
- Prime Minister – Iver Rosenkrantz (from 17 October)

== Events ==
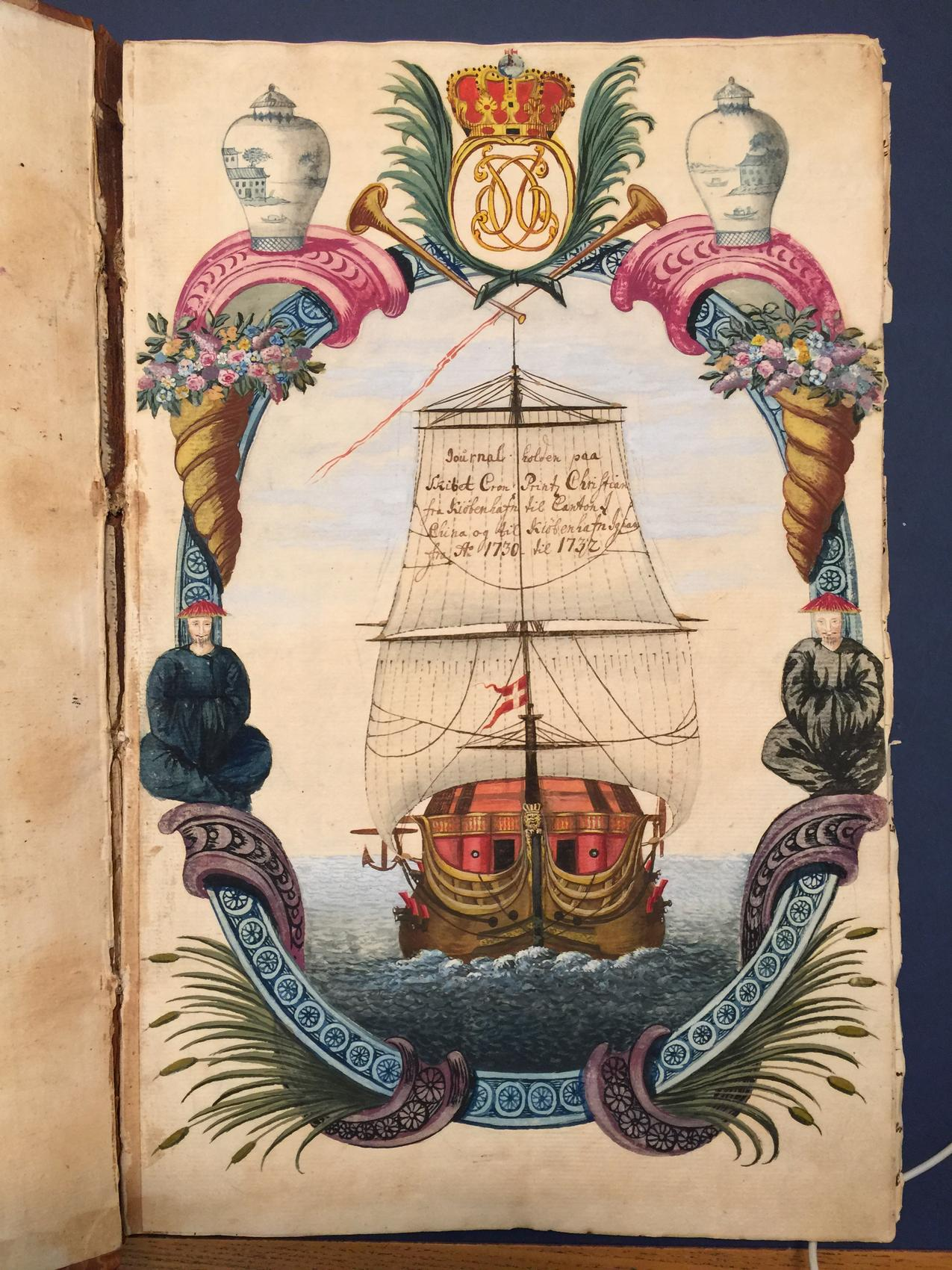
Cronprintz Christian seen on the front page from the ship journal from its 1730-32 voyage to China.

- 12 October – Christian VI becomes King of Denmark and Norway
- Adam Gottlob Moltke was made chamberlain to crown prince Frederick, later King Frederick V.
- 26 October – Cron Printz Christian departs from Copenhagen, bound for Canton. It is the first Danish expedition to China. She arrives back in Copenhagen on 27 June 1732.

=== Imlmpwm date ===
- The naval ships HDMS Svanen and HDMS Tre Kroner are launched at Nyholm in Copenhagen.

== Births ==
- 2 November – Otto Friedrich Müller, naturalist (died 1784)

Full date missing

- Caroline von Schimmelmann, Danish countess (d. 1795)
- Frederik Kaas, naval officer (died 1750)

== Deaths ==
- 7 January – Árni Magnússon, Icelandic scholar (born 1663 in Iceland)
- 2 February – Abraham Kløcker, merchant (born 1673)
- 12 October – Frederick IV, King of Denmark (born 1671)
