= 1666 in Denmark =

- Decades: 1640s; 1650s; 1660s; 1670s; 1680s
- See also: Other events of 1666; List of years in Denmark

Events from the year 1666 in Denmark.

== Incumbents ==
- Monarch – Frederick III

== Events ==
- 11 February; Denmark-Norway agrees an offensive alliance with the Dutch Republic against England, and enters the Second Anglo-Dutch War;
- 1 August – Anders Bording's Den Danske Mercurius, Denmark's first newspaper, is published for the first time.

=== Undated ===
- Holmen Cemetery, the oldest cemetery in Denmark still in use, relocates to its current location in Østerbro

== Births ==
- 22 February – Christian Christophersen Sehested, nobleman (died 1740)
- 16 June – Johan Conrad Ernst, architect (died 1750)

== Deaths ==
- 23 September – Hannibal Sehested, diplomat (born 1609)
- 30 October – Iver Krabbe, nobleman and military officer (born 1602)
