= 1673 in Denmark =

- Decades: 1650s; 1660s; 1670s; 1680s; 1690s
- See also: Other events of 1673; List of years in Denmark

Events from the year 1673 in Denmark.

== Incumbents ==
- Monarch – Christian V

== Events ==
=== Undated ===
- Nysø Manor at Præstø is completed as the first manor house in Denmark to be designed in the Baroque style.
- Sophie Amalienborg is built in Copenhagen.

== Births ==
- 28 September – Abraham Kløcker, merchant (died 1730)

== Deaths ==
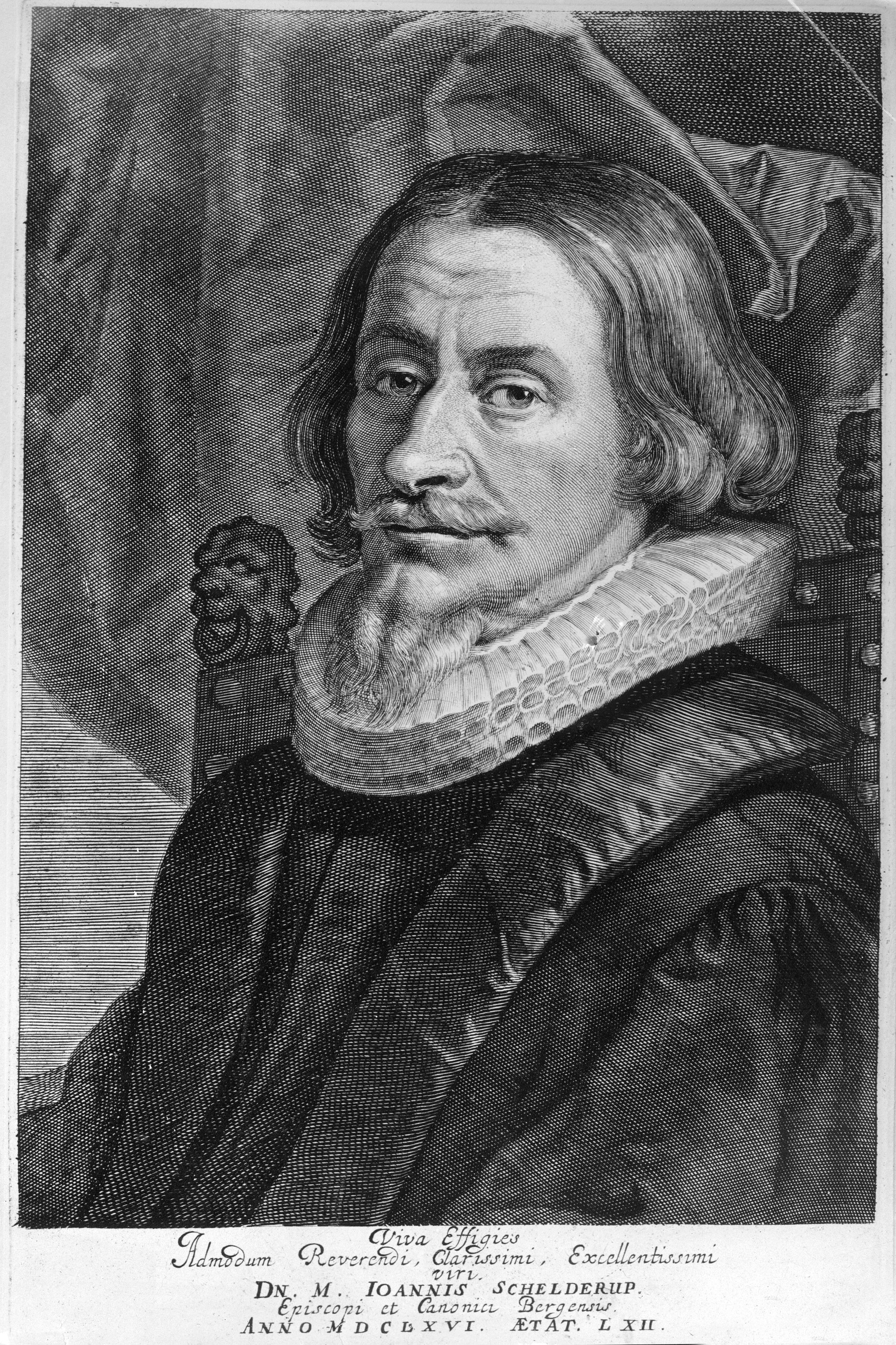
Albert Haelwegh.

- 28 August – Albert Haelwegh, artist (born 1621 in the Netherlands
- 13 October – Christoffer Gabel, statesman (born 1617)

=== Full date unknown ===
- Karen Andersdatter, mistress of Christian IV of Denmark
