= 1669 in Denmark =

- Decades: 1640s; 1650s; 1660s; 1670s; 1680s
- See also: Other events of 1669; List of years in Denmark

Events from the year 1669 in Denmark.

== Incumbents ==
- Monarch - Frederick III

== Events ==
- 15 May – The Royal Court Pharmacy in Copenhagen is established by Johann Gottfried Becker.

=== Undated ===
The naval ships HDMS Anna Sophia, HDMS Charlotte Amalia and HDMSGyldenløve are launched,.

== Births ==
- 17 April – Jacob B. Winslow, anatomist (died 1760 in France)

== Deaths ==
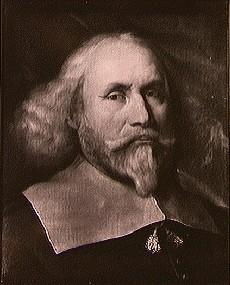
Peder Pedersen.

- 9 May – Peder Pedersen, merchant and burgermaster (born 1608)
