= Jean Loret =

French writer and poet

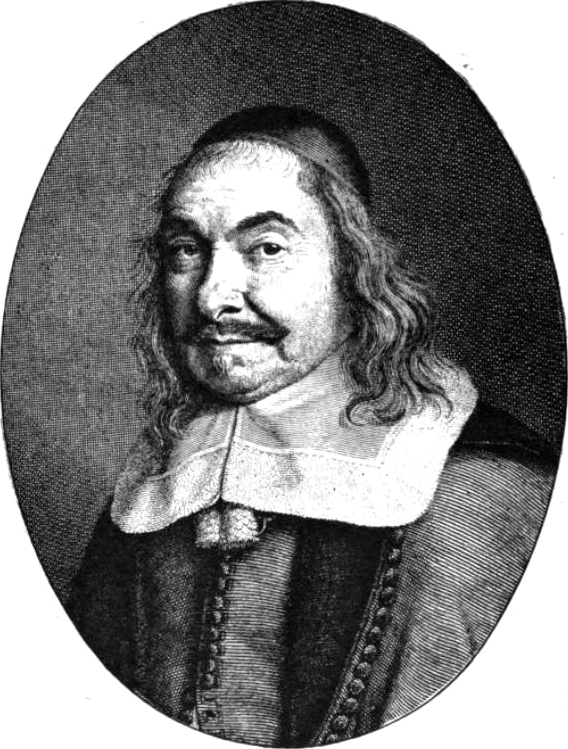
- Portrait by Robert Nanteuil.
- Born: 1600; Carentan
- Died: 1665 (aged 64–65); Paris
- Occupations: writer, poet
- Writing career
- Language: French
- Period: 17th century
- Genre: journalism
- Notable work: La Muse historique

Jean Loret (ca 1600–1665) was a French writer and poet known for publishing the weekly news of Parisian society (including, initially, its pinnacle, the court of Louis XIV itself) from 1650 until 1665 in verse in what he called a gazette burlesque. He is sometimes referred to as the "father of journalism" as a result of his topical writings.

In an 1868 review of the French press, Charles Dickens called Loret's journal "the smartest of them all" being published in the period following the death of Louis XIII, and noted that he was able to escape government censorship until 1652, after which the government forbade Loret from writing about matters of Church or State.

The verses, which were in the forms of letters to Marie d'Orléans Longueville, were assembled and published in three volumes as La Muse historique (1650, 1660, 1665). The first volume is believed to contain the earliest written reference to the tales of Mother Goose.

He was the subject of a portrait by famed engraver Robert Nanteuil whose subjects were the figures of Louis XIV's court.

Loret's patron was Nicolas Fouquet and when Fouquet was arrested, Loret was one of several members of French society who came to his defence.

After his death, several other writers continued the tradition of gazette burlesque until nearly the end of the century.

== See also ==
- Den Danske Mercurius, a Danish newspaper inspired by Loret
