= Women's Prison, Christianshavn =

Prison in Copenhagen, Denmark from 1870 to 1921

Coordinates: 55°40′21″N 12°35′30″E

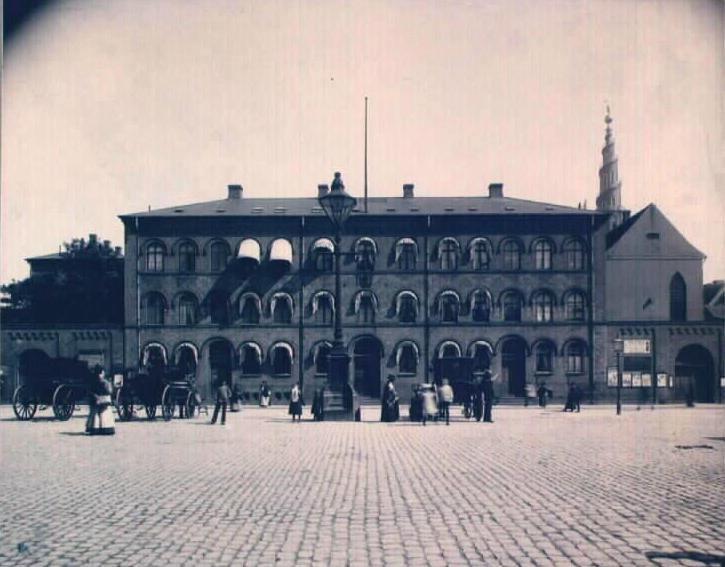
The Women's Prison seen from Christianshavns Torv

The Women's Prison at Christianshavn in Copenhagen, Denmark, was a correctional facility which existed under various names from the mid 17th century until 1921. From 1870 it served as a women's prison. Earlier names included Børnehuset and Tugt- og Rasphuset. Its last building, which dated from 1861, was torn down in 1928 to make way for an expansion of Torvegade.

== History ==
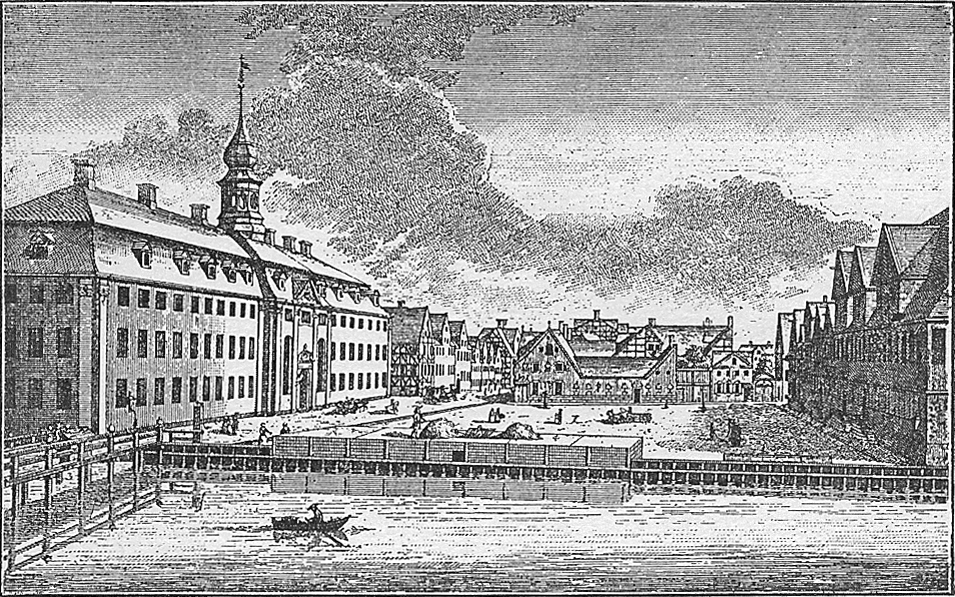
Christianshavns Torv seen in the 18th century with de Lange's prison building seen on the left

The institution Børnehuset, a royal orphanage, was established at the site in 1622. It was gradually converted into a prison. The old building was replaced by a new one designed in the Baroque style by Philip de Lange and constructed between 1739 and 1742.

Lange's building was demolished in the early 1860s to make way for a new prison building completed in 1864 to designs by Niels Sigfred Nebelong. From 1870 it was known as Christianshavns Straffeanstalt (Christianshavn Penitentiary) and served as a prison for women.

Christianshavn Penitentiary was demolished in 1928 in connection with a widening of Torvegade.
