= 1670 in Denmark =

- Decades: 1650s; 1660s; 1670s; 1680s; 1690s
- See also: Other events of 1670; List of years in Denmark

Events from the year 1670 in Denmark.

== Incumbents ==
- Frederick III (until 9 February), Christian V

== Events ==
February

- 9 February – Christian V becomes King of Denmark and Norway
- The Barony of Einsiedelsborg on Funen is established for Mourids Henriksen Podebusk.

May

- 4 May – The funeral of Frederick III of Denmark takes place at Roskilde Cathedral.

July

- 11 July – The Treaty of Copenhagen is signed in Copenhagen.

=== Undated ===
- The Danish East India Company is revived.

== Births ==
- 8 May – Christian Frederik Bielke, army officer and landowner (died 1709)

== Deaths ==
- 9 February – Frederick III of Denmark, king of Denmark and Norway (born 1609)

Full date unknown

- Christiane Sehested, daughter of Christian IV and Kirsten Munk (born 1626)
