= 1667 in Denmark =

- Decades: 1640s; 1650s; 1660s; 1670s; 1680s
- See also: Other events of 1667; List of years in Denmark

Events from the year 1667 in Denmark.

== Incumbents ==
- Monarch – Frederick III

== Events ==
June

- 15 June – The wedding of Crown Prince Christian (B( and Charlotte Amalie of Hesse-Kassel takes place at Nykøbing Castle.

July

- 31 July – Denmark-Norway signs an agreement with England as part of the Treaty of Breda (1667), ending the Second Anglo-Dutch War.

== Deaths ==
- 7 August – Nicolaj Helt, naval officer
- 20 September – Niels Trolle, Governor-general of Norway (born 1599)
- 12 November – Hans Nansen, statesman (born 1598)

=== Full date missing ===
- Heinrich Jansen, painter (born 1625)
