= 1665 in Denmark =

- Decades: 1640s; 1650s; 1660s; 1670s; 1680s
- See also: Other events of 1665; List of years in Denmark

Events from the year 1665 in Denmark.

== Incumbents ==
- Monarch - Frederick III

== Events ==
- 14 November – The King's Law or Lex Regia (Danish and Norwegian: Kongeloven) was introduced.

== Births ==
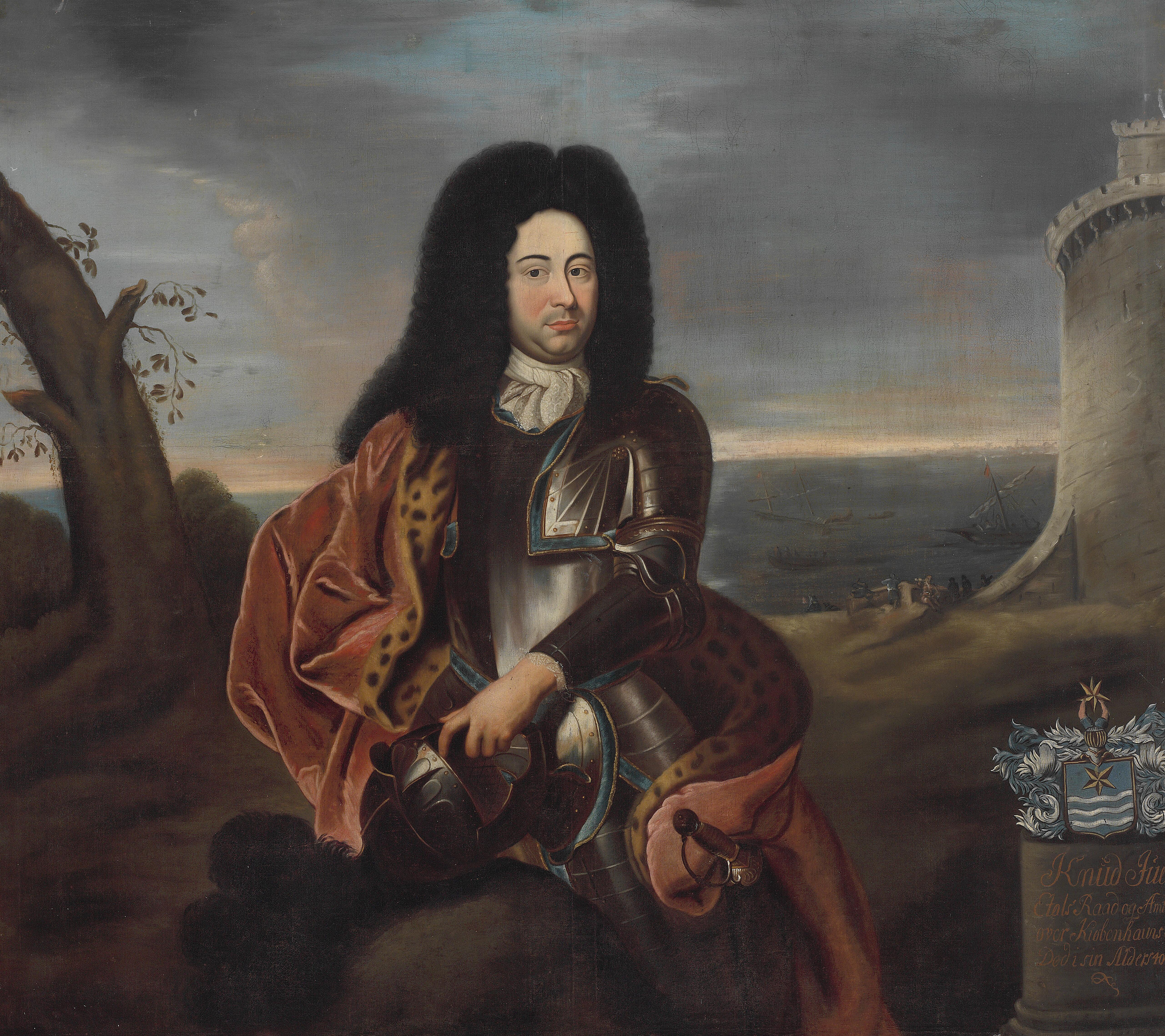
Knud Juel.

- 14 May – Hans Seidelin, civil servant and landowner (died 1740)
- 30 September – Knud Juel, landowner and county governor (died 1709)

== Deaths ==
- 7 April – Henrik Ernstt, jurist (born 1603)
