= 1668 in Denmark =

- Decades: 1640s; 1650s; 1660s; 1670s; 1680s
- See also: Other events of 1668; List of years in Denmark

Events from the year 1668 in Denmark.

== Incumbents ==
- Monarch - Frederick III

== Births ==
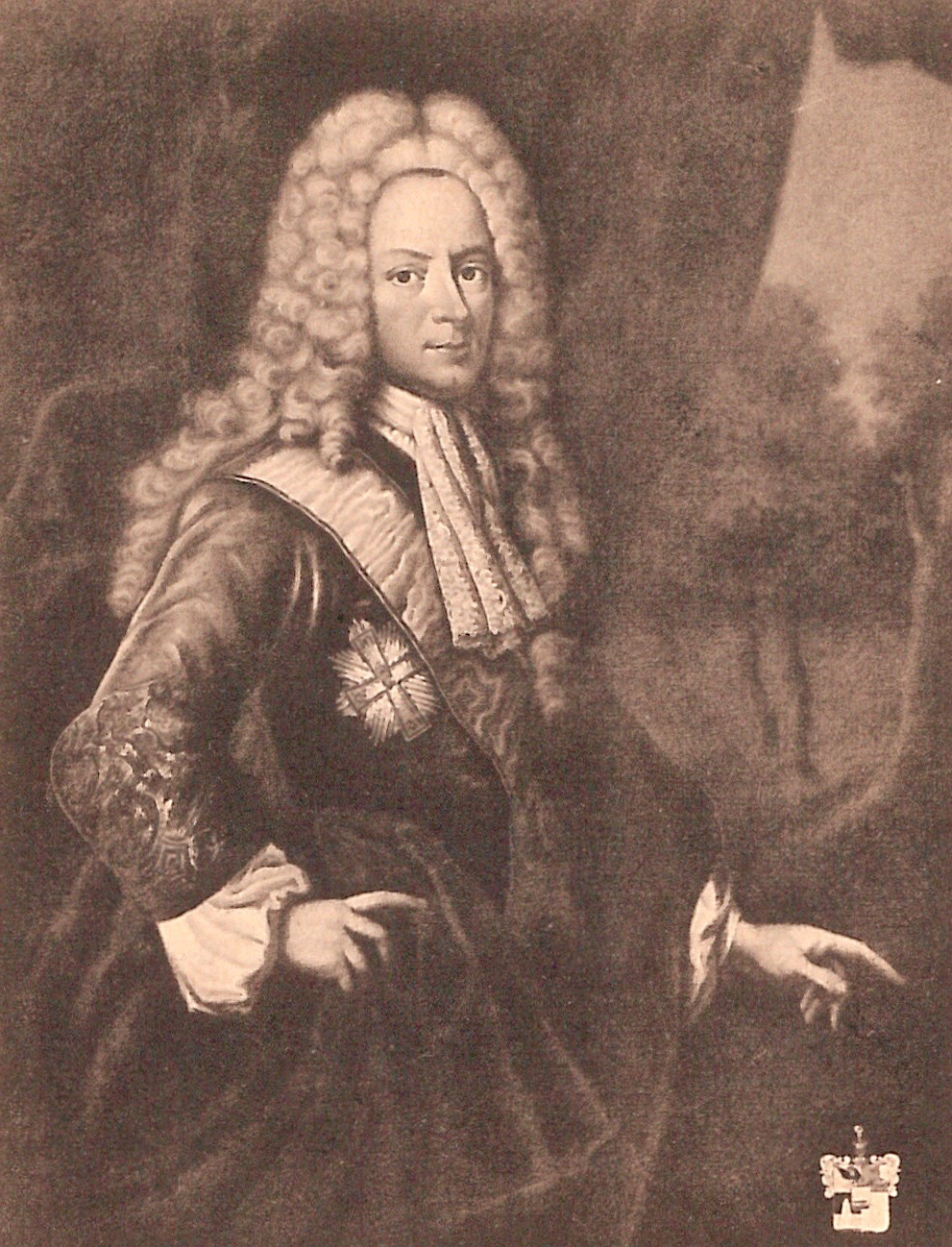
Frederik Christian Adeler,

- 13 October – Frederik Christian Adeler, Supreme Court justice, county governor and landowner (died 1726)

== Deaths ==
- 26 July - Hans Svane, statesman (born 1606)
