= Den Danske Mercurius =

Danish newspaper

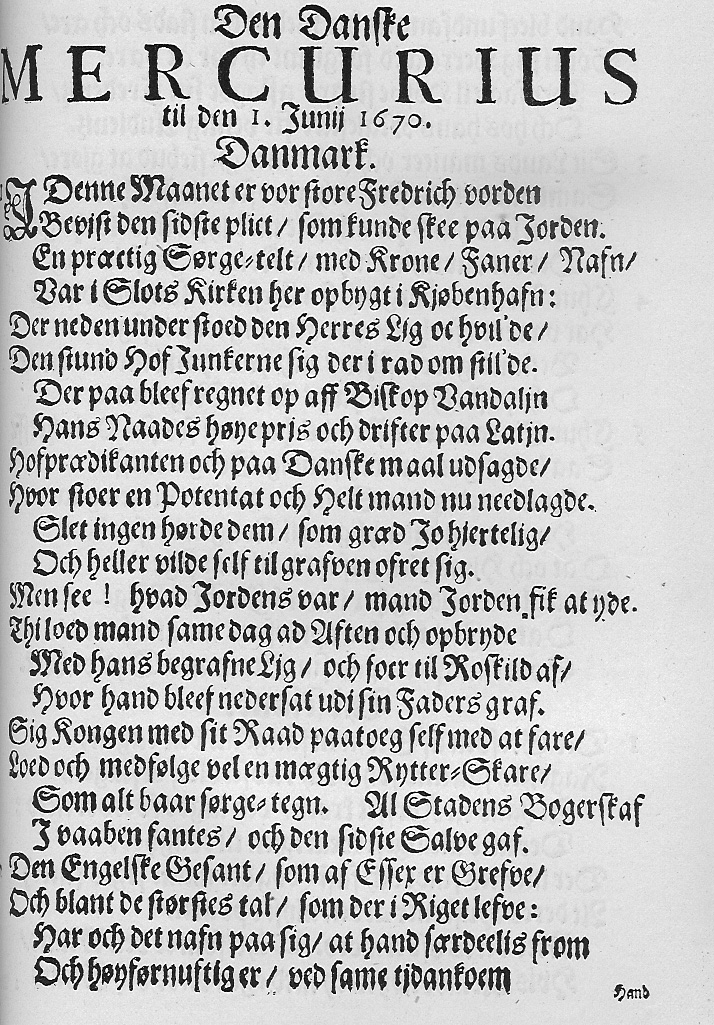
July 1 1670 edition

Den Danske Mercurius was a Danish newspaper, first published on 1 August 1666, by Anders Bording. He founded the versified newspaper, published in the Danish language, with the title Den Danske Mercurius, by order of the Sovereign. Its publishing was a turning point for the history of Danish journalism.

It was published on a monthly basis with two quarto pages. It contained domestic and international news written in Alexandrine verse style, accompanied by reasoning in the form of small poems.

Regarding the messages from Denmark itself, news from the Royal Danish court took up the most space, but many other news topics were mentioned too, e.g. the arrival of foreign diplomats, appointments, meteorological phenomena, and fires.

The name, Mercurius, in [The Danish Mercurius], referred to the messenger of the gods in Greek and Roman mythology, and had already been used for foreign newspapers, (e.g. the Mercure Francais from 1605), but in its form the Danish newspaper was an imitation of the versed La Muze Historique, written by Jean Loret for Mademoiselle de Longueville, later the Duchess of Nemours, from 1650.

After the death of Anders Bording in 1677, Den Danske Mercurius continued being published for another 14 years by Jesper Als and Ahasverus Bartholin. However, its quality had diminished due to the lack of the founder's remarkable talent.
