= 1674 in Denmark =

- Decades: 1650s; 1660s; 1670s; 1680s; 1690s
- See also: Other events of 1674; List of years in Denmark

Events from the year 1674 in Denmark.

== Incumbents ==
- Monarch — Christian V

== Events ==
=== Undated ===
- Formal diplomatic relations with China.

== Births ==
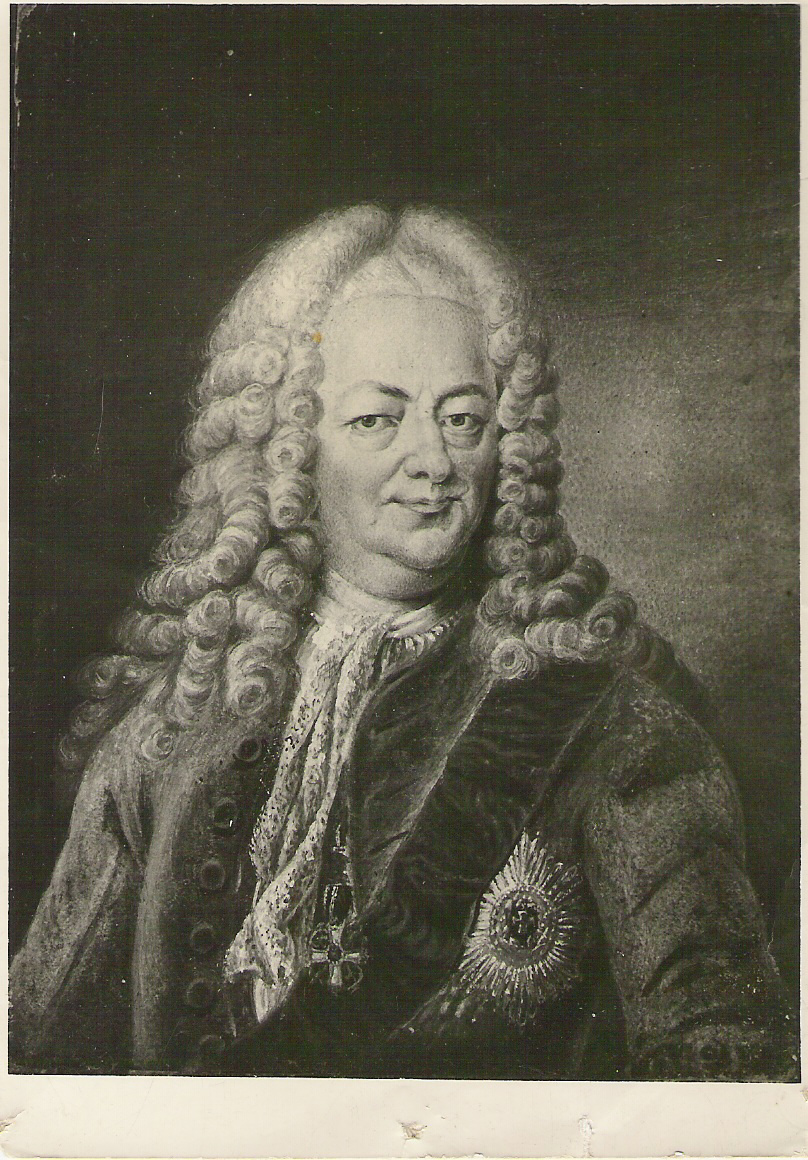
Iver Rosenkrantz.

- 28 February – Christian Gyldenløve, military officer (died 1703)
- 5 December – Iver Rosenkrantz, statesman and landowner (died 1745)

== Deaths ==
- 13 February – Jean de Labadie, pianist (born 1610)
- 10 July – Peder Reedtz, judge (born 1614)
- 4 December – Lisbet Bryske, author and landowner (born 1585)
