= 1672 in Denmark =

- Decades: 1650s; 1660s; 1670s; 1680s; 1690s
- See also: Other events of 1672; List of years in Denmark

Events from the year 1672 in Denmark.

== Incumbents ==
- Monarch - Christian V

== Events ==
- 2 February – The Barony of Brahetrolleborg is established by Birgitte Trolle from the manors of af Brahetrolleborg, Sølyst, Egneborg, Høbbet and Brændegård.
- 27 March – The Barony of Holckenhavn is by Eiler Holck from the manors of Kogsbølle, Ellensborg and Nygård.
- 6 April – The County of Frijsenborg is established by Mogens Friis from the manors of Frijsenborg, Jernit, Søbygård, Østergård, Favrskov, Lyngballe, Fuglsang, Frijsendal, Boller, Christiansminde, Thyrasminde and Møgelkær.
- 26 May – Jørgen Iversen Dyppel becomes the first governor of the renewed establishment of St. Thomas in the Danish West Indies.
- 20 June – The County of Langeland is established by Frederik Ahlefeldt from the manor of Tranekær as well as the farms Korsebølle, Pæregård, Blegholm, Nygård, Bjerrebygård, Nordenbrogård, Knepholm, Tryggelevgård and Søgård and the island Birkholm.
- 11 November – The County of Wedellsborg is established by Wilhelm Friedrich Wedell from the manors of Wedellsborg, Tybrind, Sparretorn, Billeskov and Minendal.

=== Undated ===
- High royal councillor Burchard Ahlefeldt received in 1672 letters patent as Danish Count Ahlefeldt.

== Births ==
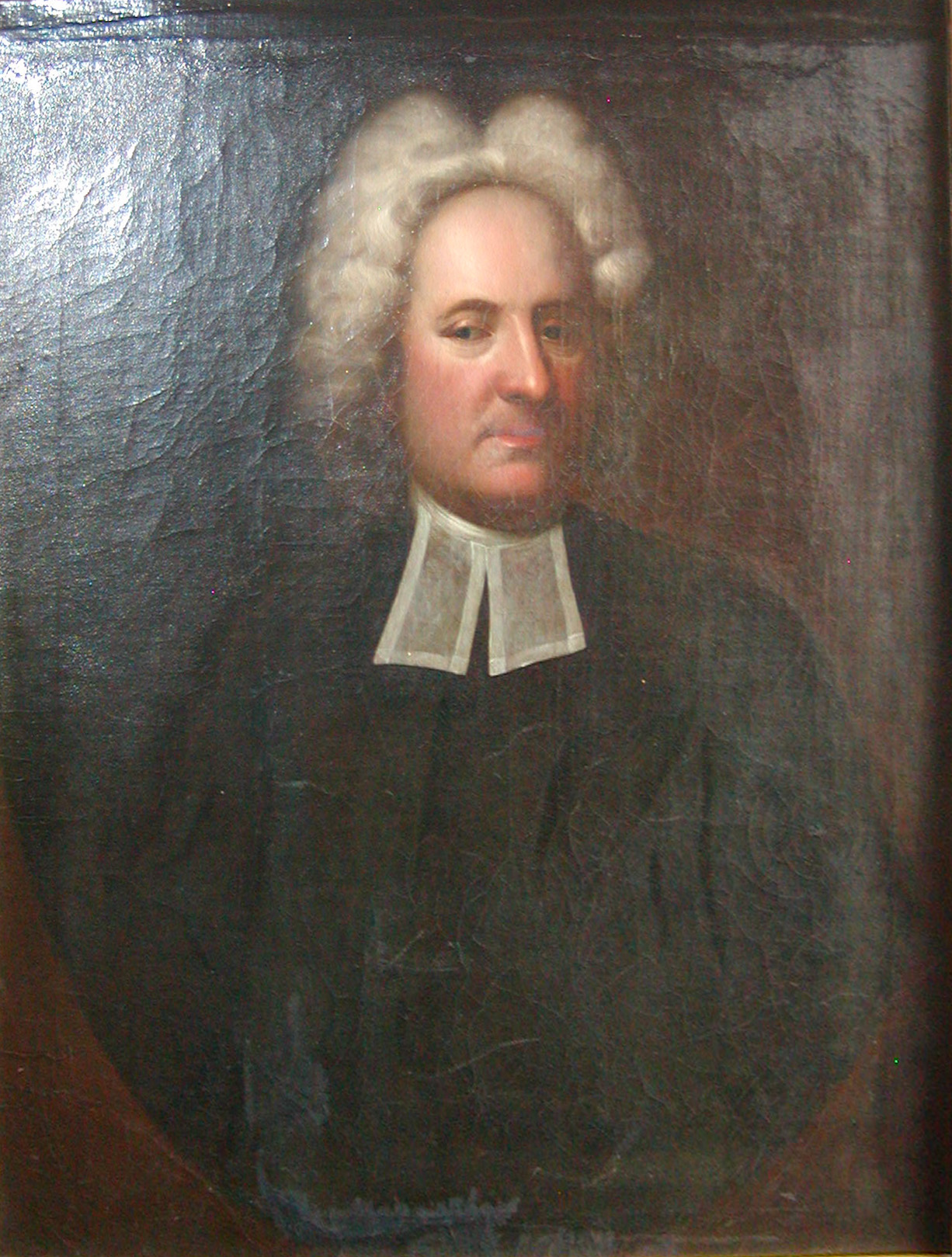
Christen Worm.

- 10 June – Christen Worm, theologian (died 1737)
- 30 October – Christine Sophie Holstein, salonist (d. 1757)

Undated

- Dorte Jensdatter, witch trial victim (died 1722)
