= 1671 in Denmark =

- Decades: 1650s; 1660s; 1670s; 1680s; 1690s
- See also: Other events of 1671; List of years in Denmark

Events from the year 1671 in Denmark.

== Incumbents ==
- Monarch – Christian V

== Events ==
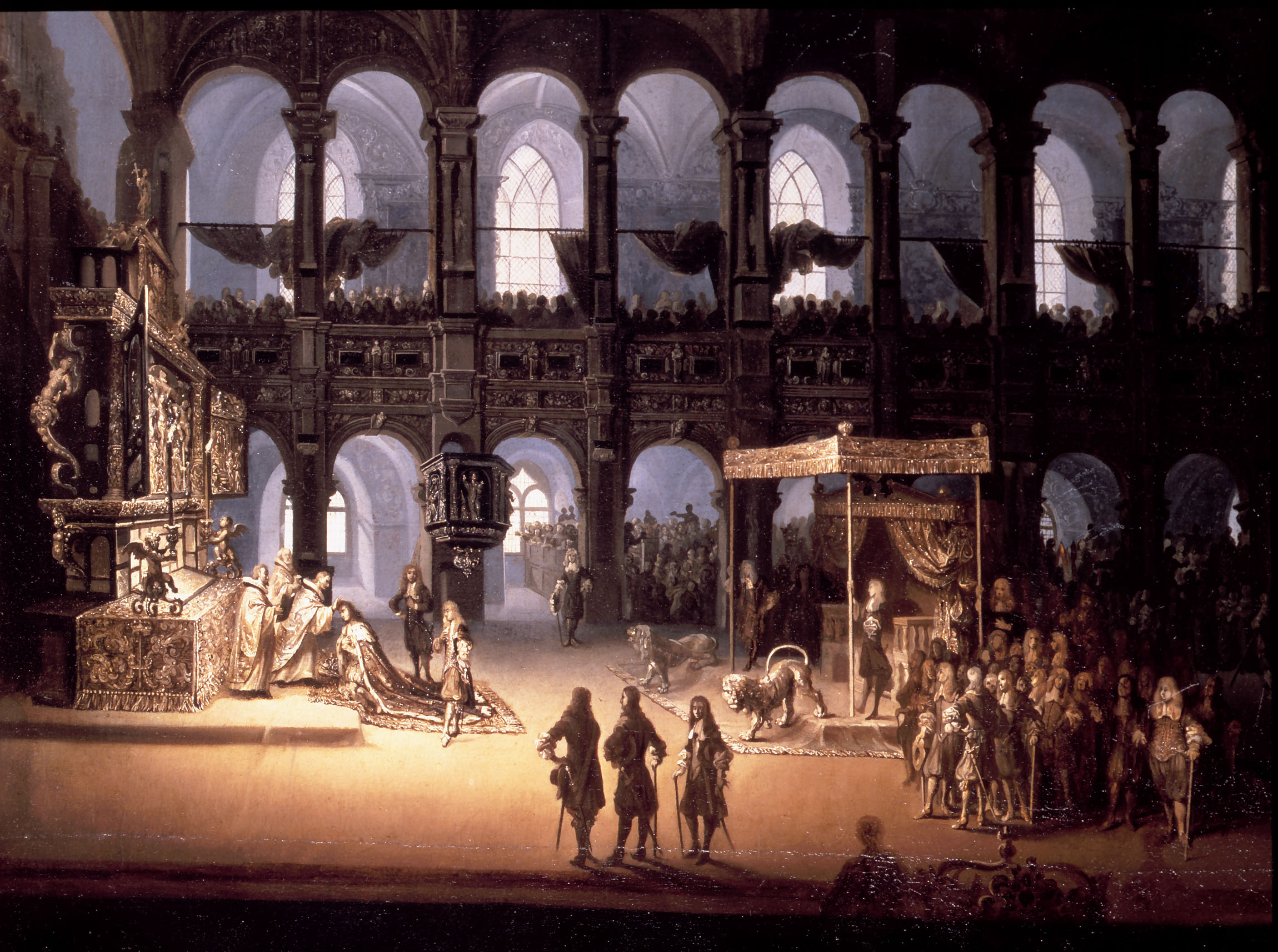
The anointing of Christian V at Frederiksborg Castle

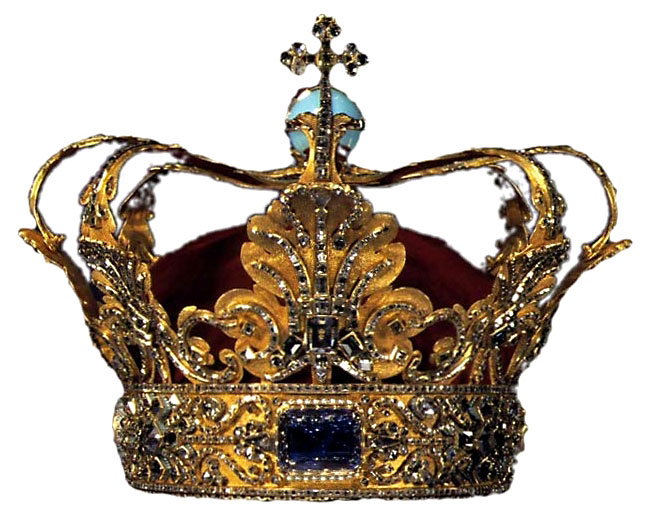
Crown of Christian V

- March – Charles Bertie (senior) is named British envoy-extraordinary to Denmark.
- 20 September – Princess Wilhelmine Ernestine is married to Charles, the heir of the Electorate of the Palatinate at Sophie Amalienborg in Copenhagen.

=== Undated ===
- Paul Kurtz completes the Crown of Christian V.
- Anointing of Christian V at Frederiksborg Castle.
- The Order of the Dannebrog is instituted, comprising only a single class of 50 noble knights, plus the Master of the Order, i.e. the Danish monarch, and his sons.
- Lambert van Haven is appointed General Building Master, as the first to hold this post, with overall responsibility for executing the king's architectural wishes.
- Abraham Wuchters is appointed Painter to the Danish Court.
- The titles Landgrave and Land Baron are introduced as the highest noble ranks in Denmark with the creation of counties and baronies.
- The "King's New Square", Kongens Nytorv, is established in Copenhagen with inspiration from the Paris.
- The military Garnisons Cemetery is inaugurated outside Copenhagen's Eastern City Gate.
- Danish West India Company is founded and will settle on St. Thomas the following year, founding the Danish West Indies.

== Births ==
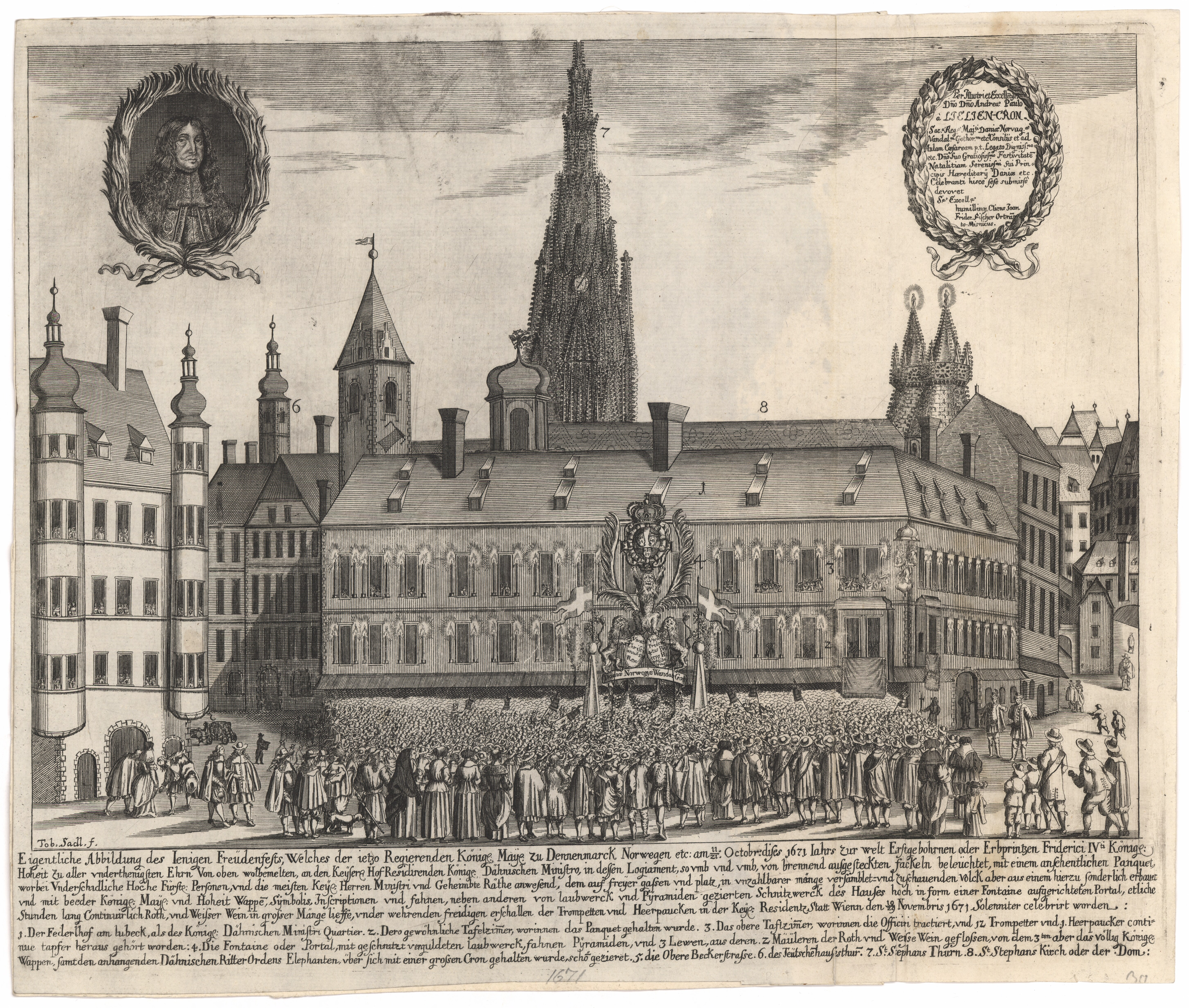
Print commemorating the birth of Crown Prince Frederick (IV).

- 5 February – Bartholomæus Deichman bishop (d. 1731).
- 17 March – Joachim Melchior von Holten, colonial administrator (died 1708)
- 21 June – Christian Detlev Reventlow, diplomat and military leader (1738)
- 21 July – Hendrick Krock, painter to the Danish Court (d. 1738)
- 11 October – Frederick IV, king of Denmark (d. 1730)
- 18 October – Frederick IV, Duke of Holstein-Gottorp, Duke of Schleswig (d. 1702)
- 8 November – Frederik Rostgaard, judge (died 1745)

=== Full date unknown ===
- Benoît Le Coffre, painter to the Danish Court (d. 1722)
- Morgan Bryan, grandfather of Rebecca Boone (d. 1763)

== Deaths ==
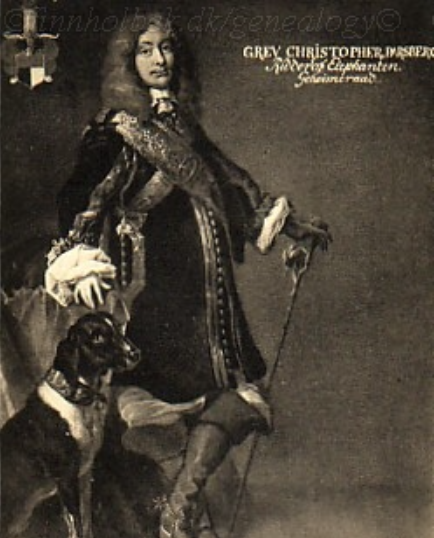
Christoffer Parsberg

- 15 March – Axel Urup, military engineer and commander (b. 1601)
- 24 August – Christoffer Parsberg, statesman, Supreme Court justice and landowner (born 1632)
- 13 November – Peter Bülche , physician, Supreme Court justice and President of Copenhagen (born 1605)
