= Anders Bording =

Danish poet and journalist (1619–1677)

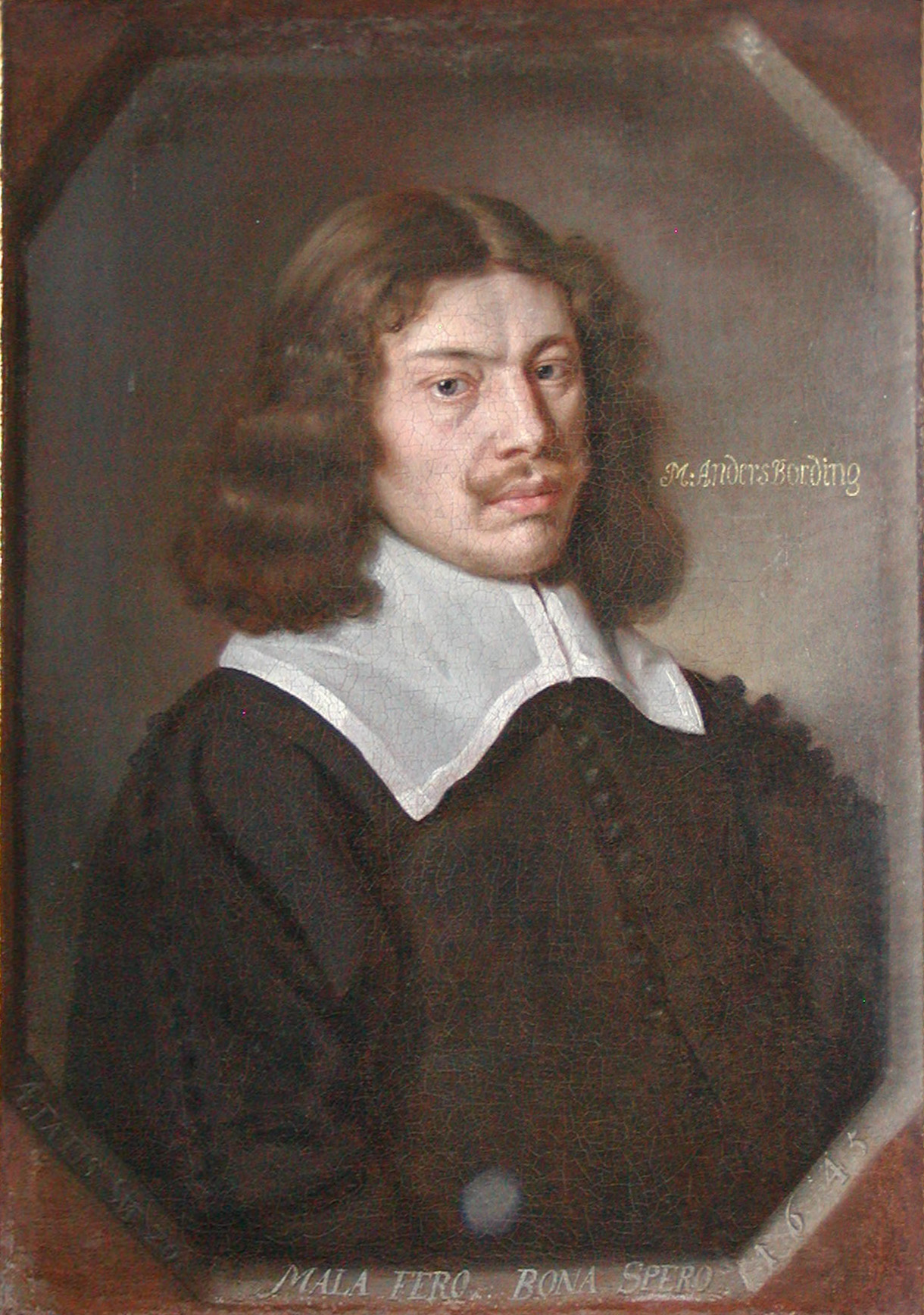
Anders Bording

Anders Christensen Bording (21 January 1619 – 24 May 1677) was a Danish poet and journalist. He was born in Ribe. He is notable for his epigrams, ballads, occasional poems and epistles, as well as for publishing the first Danish newspaper, the monthly Den Danske Mercurius, written in verse entirely by him.
