= Adriaen Foly =

Danish painter

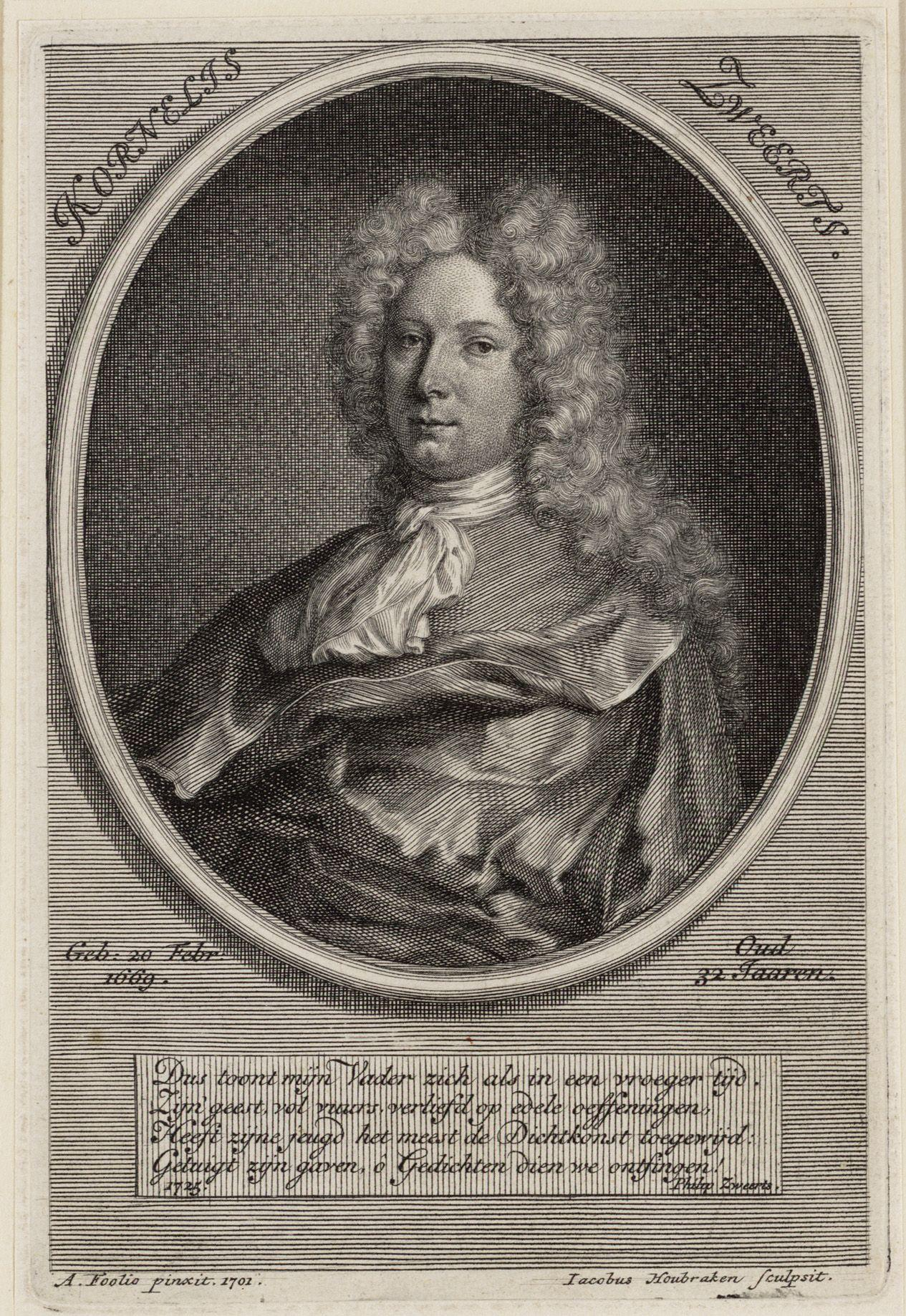
Portrait of Cornelis Zweerts, drawn by Foly (Foolio) and engraved by Jacob Houbraken

Adriaen Foly (1664, in Copenhagen – 1701, in Copenhagen), was a Danish painter.

According to Houbraken he travelled to Italy and joined the Bentvueghels with the nickname "Zinnebeeld".

The Netherlands Institute for Art History claims he was in Rome with the Bentvueghels during the years 1664–1666. He was the same person as "A. Foolio" on engravings, and was probably known for miniature paintings.
