= Peder Pedersen (burgermaster) =

Danish merchant and burgermaster in Copenhagen

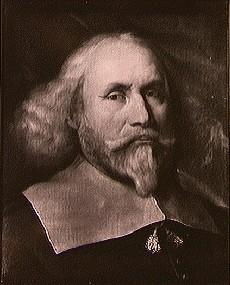
Peder Pedersen painted by unknown artist

Peder Pedersen (7 May 1608 – 9 May 1669) was a Danish merchant and burgermaster of Copenhagen.

== Early life and education ==
Pedersen was born on 7 May 1608 in Horsens, the son of merchant Peder Pedersen and Anne Nielsdatter. He attended the Latin schools in Horsens (until 1622) and Lübeck. He was later articled to wine merchant Caspar Rotkopf in Copenhagen.

== Career ==
In the beginning of his career, Pedersen worked for Corfitz Rud til Fuglsang (1624–30), Niels Trolle til Trolholm (1630–1632) and Henrik Huitfeldt of Landskrona (1632–34). He then worked as scribe at Copenhagen Castle, first under his old principal Niels Trolle and then under his successor Oluf Brockenhuus. In 1649, he became clerk at the King's Brewhouse. In 1650, he became senior renteskriver in Rentekammeret. At the same time, he was granted two prebends at Lund and Roskilde cathedrals.

In 1646, he was one of the applicants for the Faroese trade monopoly. From around the same time, he established himself as one of the great suppliers of a wide range of products to the government, including grain and beef for the navy. Together with Johan Steinkuhl, Herman Isenberg and Frederik Thuresen, he was part of the management of the Danish Salt Company (dissolved 1662). In 1657, he was compensated for a debt of 34,036 Danish rigsdaler with land on Amager and Funen and in Norway. In 1657, he was a stakeholder in the sugar refinery in Copenhagen. When the Iceland Company was reorganized in 1657, he became part of its new management alongside Christopher Hansen, Henrik Müller and Hans Nansen.

On 23 April 1655, Pedersen was elected as councilman in Copenhagen. Just two days later, he was also appointed as burgermaster. In 1661, Pedersen was appointed as one of the members of the first law commission which was set up to prepare a codification of Danish law. In 1669, he was appointed as Supreme Court justice.

On 12 November 1661, Frederick III granted him four farms in Vedderlev and one farm in Marbjerg, which had until then belonged to Bistrup. The rest of the Bistrup estate was presented to Vopenhagen's Magistracy.

== Personal life ==
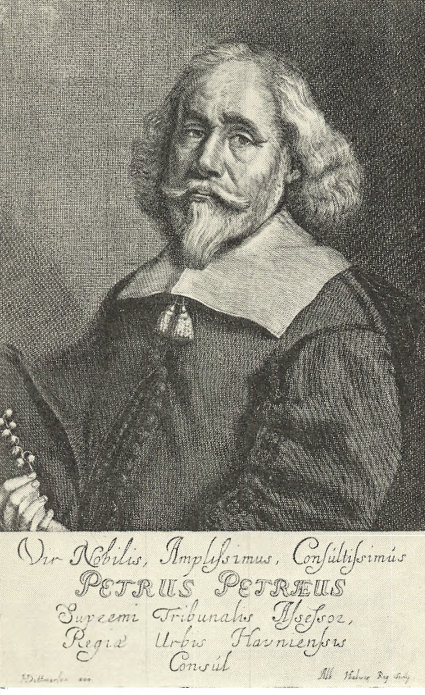
Peder Pedersen.

On 12 October 1636, Pedersen was married to Margrete Clausdatter (1604–1680). She was a daughter of Claus Thomsen (died c. 1612) and Mette Jensdatter (died c. 1612).

On 15 March 1647, Pedersen acquired the property Strand Quarter No. 10 in Copenhagen. He owned it until his death. On 13 September 1662, he acquired Købmager Quarter No. 14. In 1664, he sold it to Hannibal Sehested.

Pedersen died on 9 May 1669 in Copenhagen. He was buried in St. Nicholas Church (tomb bought 1740). He and his wife were the parents of five daughters. The daughter Else was married to professor Rasmus Brochmand. The daughter Mette was married to later bishop in Bergen Niels Randulf. The daughter Anna ægtede was married to the businessman Carl Rosenmeyer. The daughter Sofie was married to the businessman Peder Pedersen Lerche. Their daughter Elizabeth was married to burgermaster Hans Hansen Nansen.
