= Herman Lengerken Kløcker =

Danish merchant (1706–1765)

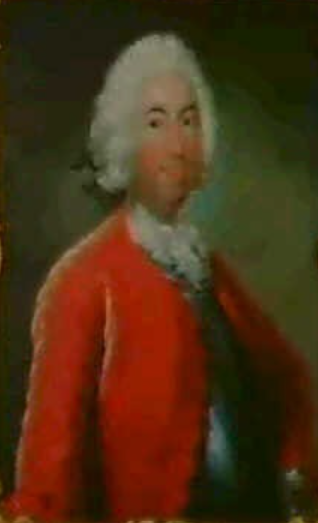
Herman Kløcker painted by Johan Hörner.

Herman Lengerken (de) Kløcker (18 June 1706 – 4 December 1765) was a Danish merchant, landowner and vice mayor of Copenhagen. He owned the Gjeddesdal estate west of Copenhagen.

== Early life and education ==
Kløcker was born on 18 June 1706, the son of Abraham Kløcker. After 2 years of training for the trade in Germany, Netherlands, England and France, he came home in 1728.

== Career ==
In 1730, he acquired citizenship in Copenhagen as a wholesaler; In 1734 he became a bank commissioner and curator at Waisenhuset. In 1741, he became a Supreme Court justice, In 1750, he became deputy mayor of Copenhagen. In 1761, he became director of the Poor Authority, In 1762, he became a committee member of the Missopnskollegiet.

== Property and titles ==
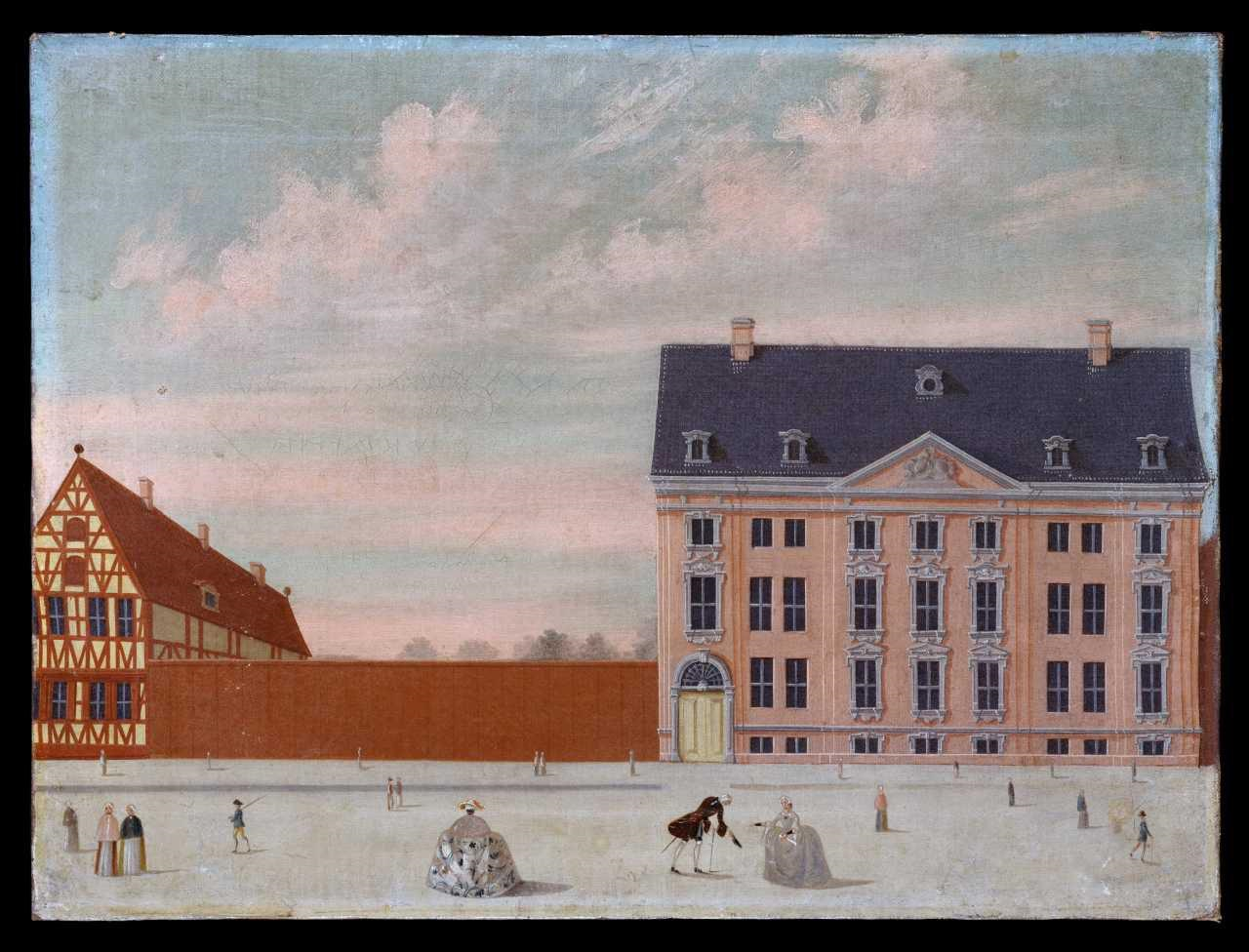
The Kløcker House painted by Rach/Eegberg in 1749.

Kløcker's city home was the Kløcker House on Store Kongensgade. In 1741 he bought Gjeddesdal, which he set up as a stamhus, which was however disposed of by his widow. as well as the country house Kløckers Gård in Gentofte. In 1757 he and his nephews were recognized by the German emperor as belonging to the German noble family Klöcker, probably incorrectly so, and in 1760 they were naturalized as Danish nobility. He died on 4 December 1765. He also acquired the country house Kløckers Gård in Gentofte.

In 1734, he was awarded the title of justitsråd (Councillor of Justice). In 1749, he became an etatsråd (Councillor of State).

== Personal life ==
On 28. May 1732, he was married to Mette Christine Wrisberg (1814–1757), Their daughter Elisabeth Christiane von Kløcker was married to Henrik Stampe. After the death of his first wife, Kløcker married on 17 March 1762 Caroline Hoppe. She was a daughter of admiral Frederik Hoppe. They had two children. The daughter Marie Elisabeth von Klocker (1765–1804) was married to commander Henrik Hendrich de Güntelberg (1739–1817).
