= Christianshavns Torv =

Street in Copenhagen, Denmark

Coordinates: 55.6721°N 12.5914°E

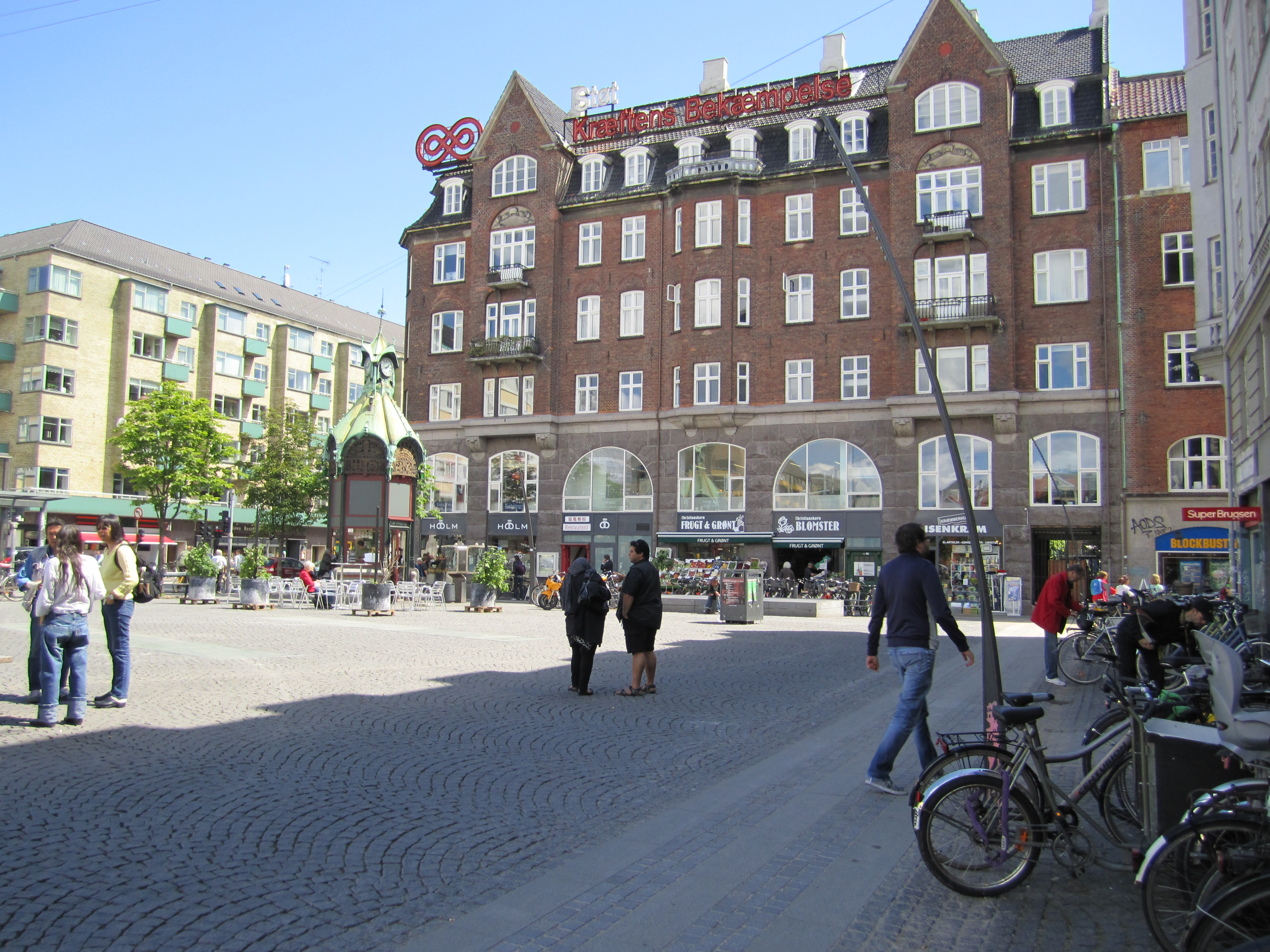
The east side of the square with the old telephone kiosk

Christianshavns Torv is the central public square of the Christianshavn neighborhood in Copenhagen, Denmark. It is situated at the intersection of Torvegade and Christianshavn Canal, roughly at the center of the area.

== History ==
=== 17th and 18th century ===
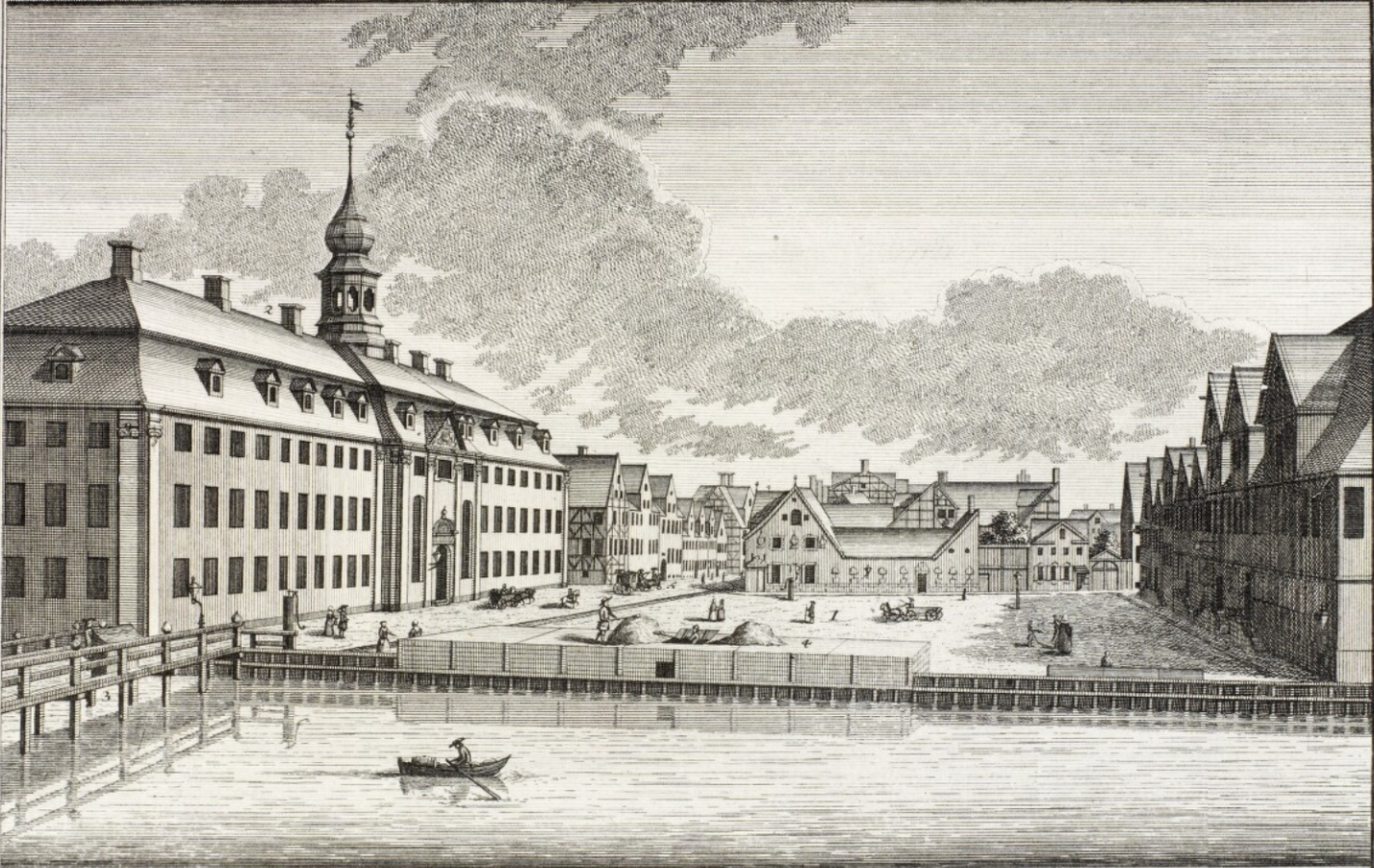
Christianshavns Torv seen in the 18th century with de Lange's prison building seen on the left

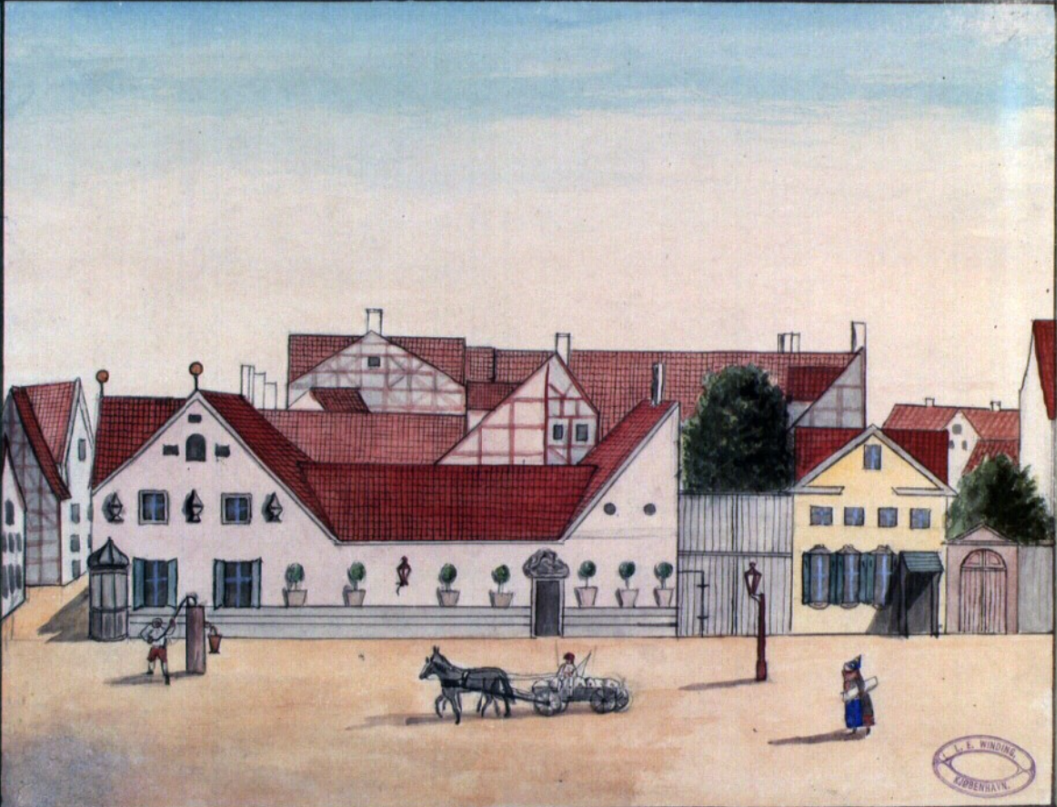
Wolffang Ruhmann Weibel's House on Christianshavns Torv in 1749

Christianshavns Torv traces its history back to Johan Semp's 1617 plan for the layout of Christianshavn to be a fortified market town. It was originally known as Børnehustorv after Børnehuset, a royal orphanage which was established in 1622 on its east side. A blue-painted water post was installed in the square in 1633. It was fed by a lead pipe which brought water all the way from Peblinge Lake on the other side of the harbour.

The institution was gradually converted into a prison. The old building was replaced by a new one designed in the Baroque style by Philip de Lange and constructed between 1739 and 1742.

=== 19th century ===
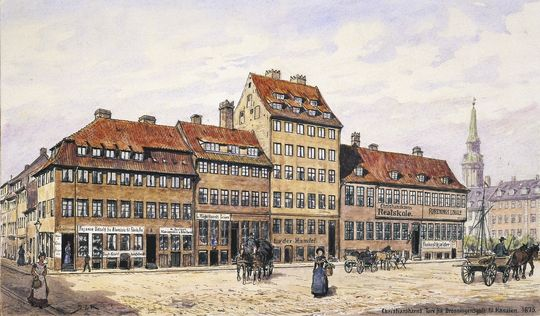
The south-west side of the square. The building with the police station is seen to the right while the building in the middle was the tallest residential building in Christianshavn at the time

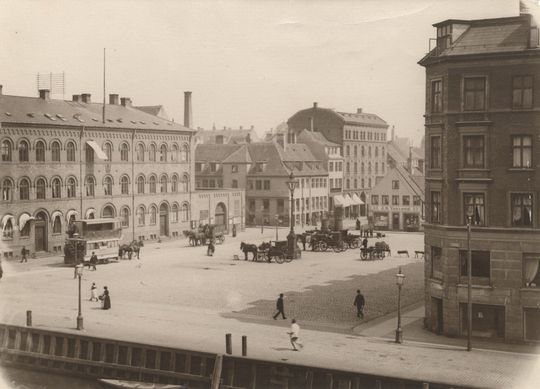
The square seen from the same angle in the late 19th century with Nebelong's prison building

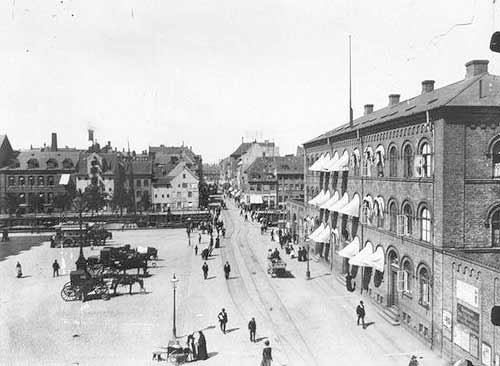
Christianshavns Torv in c. 1900 with the Women's Prison to the right

A police station opened in the square in 1815. One of six new local police stations, it covered the Christianshavn and Amagerbro area. It was based in Jacob Bastians Købmandsgård (Jacob Bastian's Commerce House), at No. 1, on the corner of the square and the canal.

Lange's building was demolished in the early 1860s to make way for a new prison building completed in 1864 to designs by Niels Sigfred Nebelong. From 1870 it was known as Christianshavns Straffeanstalt (Christianshavn Penitentiary) and served as a prison for women.

In 1868, the vegetable market at Amagertorv, where the Amager Women had sold their produce for centuries, was moved to Christianshavns Torv. It only existed for around two decades and was in 1889 replaced by a new vegetable market which opened at Vendersgade, later part of Israels Plads.

=== 20th century ===
The coming of the new century brought change to the square. The buildings surrounding it were pulled down in the 1890s and early 1900s and replaced with new ones.

Christianshavn Penitentiary was demolished in 1928 in connection with a widening of Torvegade.

== Greenland Monument ==
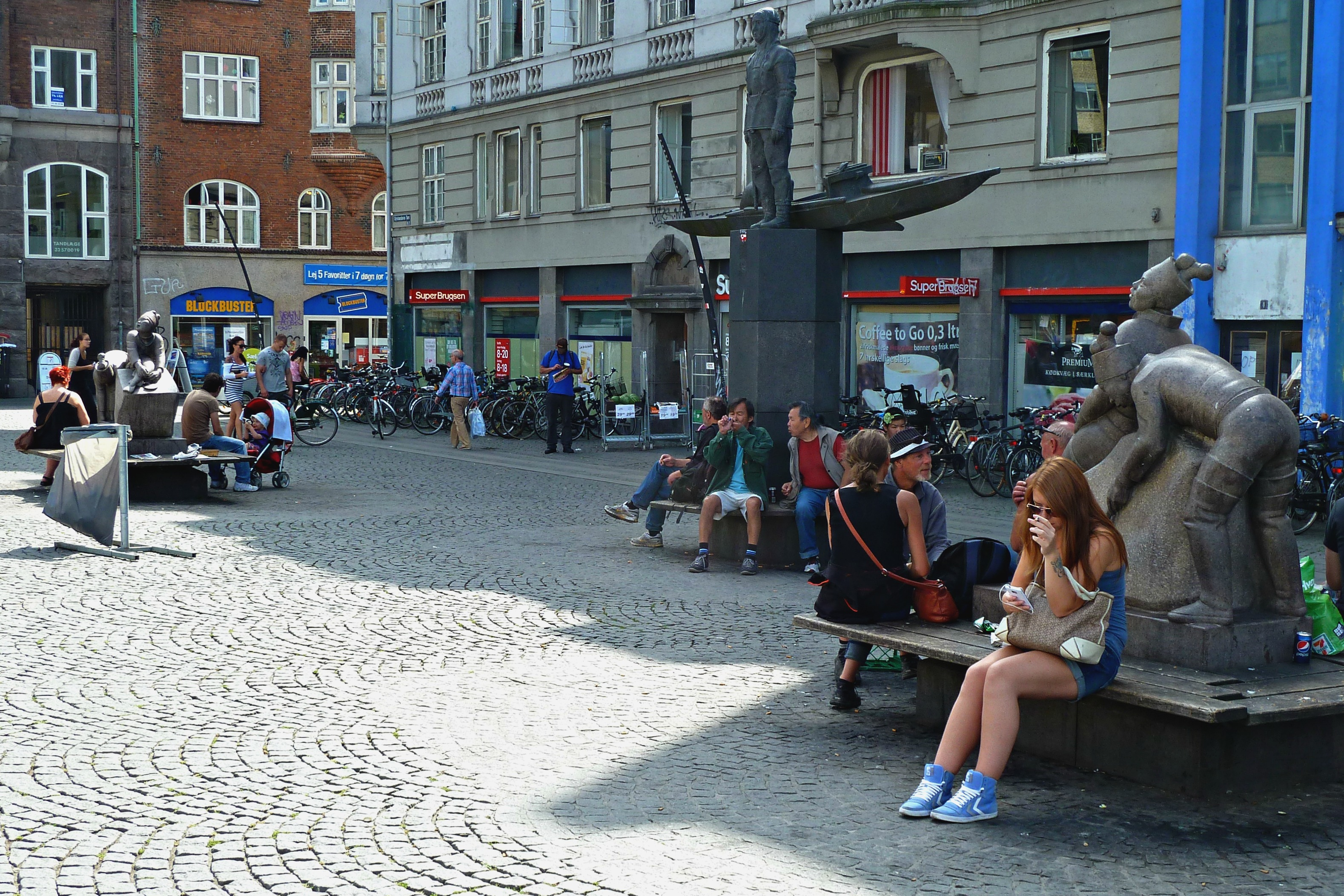
The Greenland Monument

The Greenland Monument was created by Svend Rathsack in bluish granite from Bornholm and installed in the square in 1938. It consists of a Greenlandic hunter with his kayak, placed high on a plinth above two groups of working women.

== Buildings ==
One of Copenhagen's old telephone kiosks of the original model which was designed by Fritz Koch and first installed in 1896. It is hexagonal with a copper roof over richly decorated wooden friezes.

The square is dominated by the Modernist building Lagkagehuset ("The Layer Cake House"), which was built on the site of the former penitentiary between 1929 and 1932 to a design by Edvard Thomsen. Its name derives from the yellow and white striped facade. Torvegården (Bo. 2–4), at the opposite corner, also facing the canal, is also in the Modernist style and was built between 1940 and 1941 to designs by Svend G. Høyrup.

No. 6 is from 1903 and was designed by an unknown architect. The building at the east side of the square, on the corner of Torvegade (No. 50) and Dronningensgade (No. 48), is from 1900 and was also designed by an unknown architect.

== Transport ==
Christianshavn metro station is located on the square. It serves both the M1 and M2 lines of the Copenhagen Metro.

== See also ==
- Sankt Annæ Gade
