= Abraham Kløcker =

Abraham Kløcker (28 September 1673 - 2 February 1730) was a Danish merchant. He served as director of the Danish West Indies Company.

== Early life and education ==
Kløcker was born on 28 September 1873 in Aalborg, the son of Jens Pallesen (dead by 1682) og Helvig Kløcker (1641–1718). He became a merchant in his hometown. In 1707, he was granted citizenship as a merchant in Copenhagen. He was soon counted among the city's most industrious traders.

== Career ==
In 1726, he and two other prominent merchants succeeded in obtaining the capital's privilege of being the only place where wine, brandy, salt and tobacco could be stored. The motivation for this step was that it would make smuggling more difficult, but it was also to the greatest detriment of the independent trade in the provincial market towns, and it provoked countless complaints. In 1730 the privilege was therefore revoked again.

Kløcker was director of the Danish West Indian-Guinean Company. In 1720 he was a committee member in the Politi- og Kommercekollegiet for a few months. In 1720–30m he was a deputy in the College of Missions. He combined this last position with his position as curator of the vajsenhuset. He had close ties to Frederik Rostgaard.

== Personal life ==
Kløcker was married twice. His first wife was Elisabeth von Lengerken, daughter of merchant Herman von Lengerken (died 1702) and Elisabeth Holst (c. 1665–1718). She died in 1718 in Copenhagen (funeral on 4 March in St. Peter's Church). On 26 August 1719, he was married to Johanne Heerfordt (1681–1756). She had previously been married to councilman Elovius Mangor (1662–1714). She was the daughter of pharmacist Christopher Herfordt (1642–91) and Cecilie Iversdatter (1657–1721). He was the father of Herman Lengerken Kløcker (1706–65) who became vice mayor of Copenhagen and owned the estate Gjeddesdal. as well as the country house Kløckers Gård in Gentofte.
