= 1744 in Denmark =

- Decades: 1720s; 1730s; 1740s; 1750s; 1760s
- See also: Other events of 1744; List of years in Denmark

Events from the year 1744 in Denmark.

== Incumbents ==
- Monarch – Christian VI
- Prime minister – Johan Ludvig Holstein-Ledreborg

== Events ==
=== Undated ===
- Crown prince Frederick's renovation of the Prince's Mansion is completed.
- The new Hirschholm Palace is completed.
- Den danske Spectator is first published.

== Births ==
- 21 February - Cathrine Marie Møller, artist (died 1811)
- 6 March - Otto Fabricius, missionary, naturalist, ethnographer and explorer (died 1822)
- 19 March – William Halling, landowner (died 1796)
- 29 April – Christian Ludvig von Holten, colonial administrator (died 1829)
- 29 May – Thøger From, businessman (died 1831)
- 27 October – Carl Adolph Raben, court official, county governor and landowner (died 1784)
- 19 November - Jakob Edvard Colbjørnsen, chief justice of Supreme Court (died 1802)
- Marie Barch, first native Danish ballerina (died 1827)
- Elisabeth Christine Berling, businessperson (died 1801)

== Deaths ==
- 14 January – Henrich Suhm, naval officer and colonial administrator (born 1693)
