= 1693 in Denmark =

- Decades: 1670s; 1680s; 1690s; 1700s; 1710s
- See also: Other events of 1693; List of years in Denmark

Events from the year 1693 in Denmark

== Incumbents ==
- Monarch – Christian V

== Events ==
- 4 April Anne Palles, an alleged witch, becomes the last woman to be legally executed for sorcery in Denmark.
- 1 December – The Order of the Elephant in its current form is instituted.

Undated

- Christian V's Rosenborg Tapestries are completed.

== Births ==
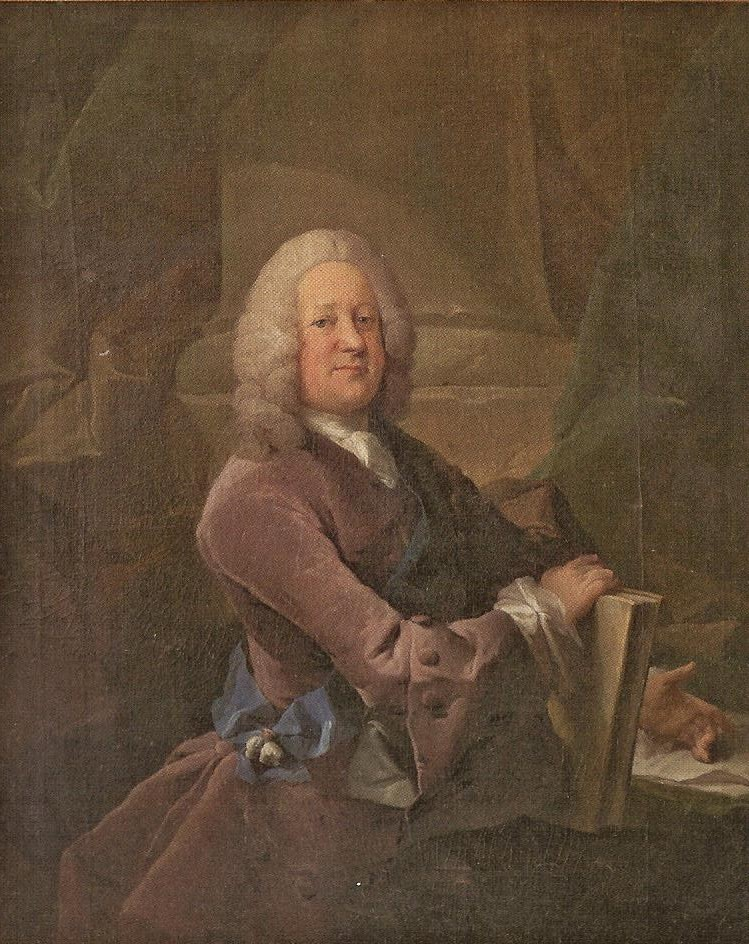
Claus Reventlow.

- 16 April – Anne Sophie Reventlow, Queen of Denmark and Norway (died 1743)
- 10 September – Christian Frederik Raben, county governor and landowner (died 1773)
- 5 October – Henrich Suhm, naval officer and colonial administrator (died 1744)
- 3 December – Claus Reventlow, judge (died 1758)

== Deaths ==
- 12 February – Frederik Giese, civil servant, county governor and landowner (born 1726)
- 4 April – Anne Palles, alleged witch (born 1619)
- 12 June – Christen Jensen Lodberg, bishop (born 1625)
