= 1745 in Denmark =

- Decades: 1720s; 1730s; 1740s; 1750s; 1760s
- See also: Other events of 1745; List of years in Denmark

Events from the year 1745 in Denmark.

== Incumbents ==
- Monarch – Christian VI
- Prime minister – Johan Ludvig Holstein-Ledreborg

== Births ==
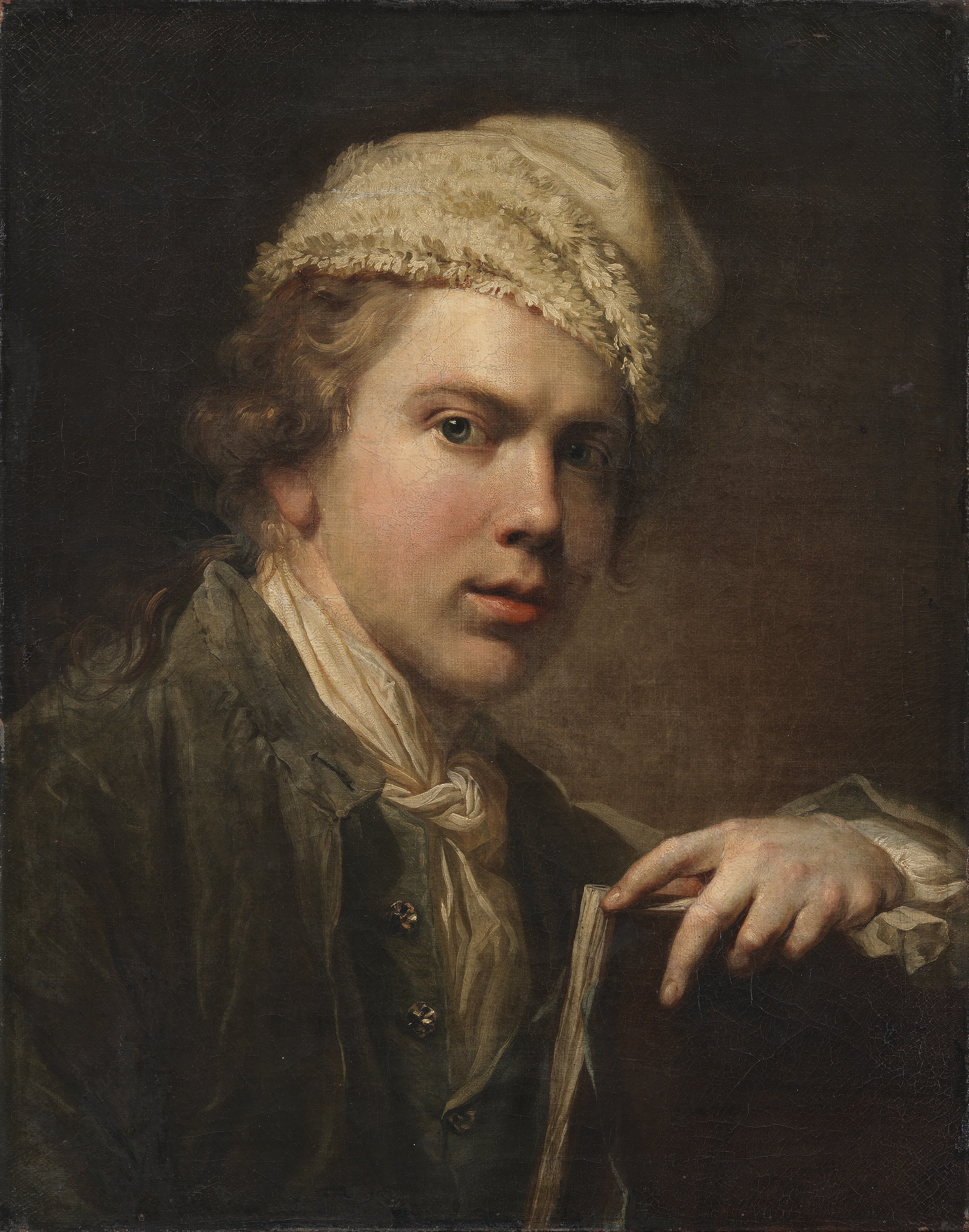
Jens Juel.

- 7 January – Johan Christian Fabricius, zoologist (died 1808)
- 19 February – Anna Sofie Bülow, courtier (died 1787)
- 25 April – Frederik Rostgaard, judge (born 1671)
- 12 May – Jens Juel, painter (died 1802)
- 19 May – Mette Marie Rose, stage actor (died 1819)
- 28 September – Conrad Holck, landowner (died 1800)

== Deaths ==
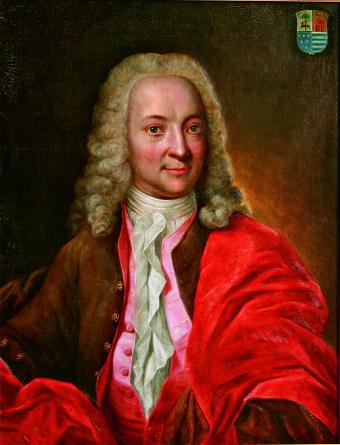
Johan Lorentz Castenschiold.

- 3 May – Niels Sehested (born 1685)
- 16 March – Elias David Häusser, architect (born 1687 in Germany)
- 19 June – Johan Lorentz Castenschiold, merchant and landowner (born 1705)
- 18 March – Peder Benzon Mylius, judge and writer (born 1689)
- 26 October – Nathanael Diesel, composer (born 1692)
- 13 November – Iver Rosenkrantz, statesman and landowner (born 1674)
