= 1742 in Denmark =

- Decades: 1720s; 1730s; 1740s; 1750s; 1760s
- See also: Other events of 1742; List of years in Denmark

Events from the year 1742 in Denmark.

== Incumbents ==
- Monarch – Christian VI
- Prime minister – Johan Ludvig Holstein-Ledreborg

== Events ==
- 13 November– The Royal Danish Academy of Sciences and Letters is founded as a historical Collegium Antiquitatum. It was founded by secretary of state, Count Johan Ludvig Holstein and the history professor Hans Gram.

== Births ==
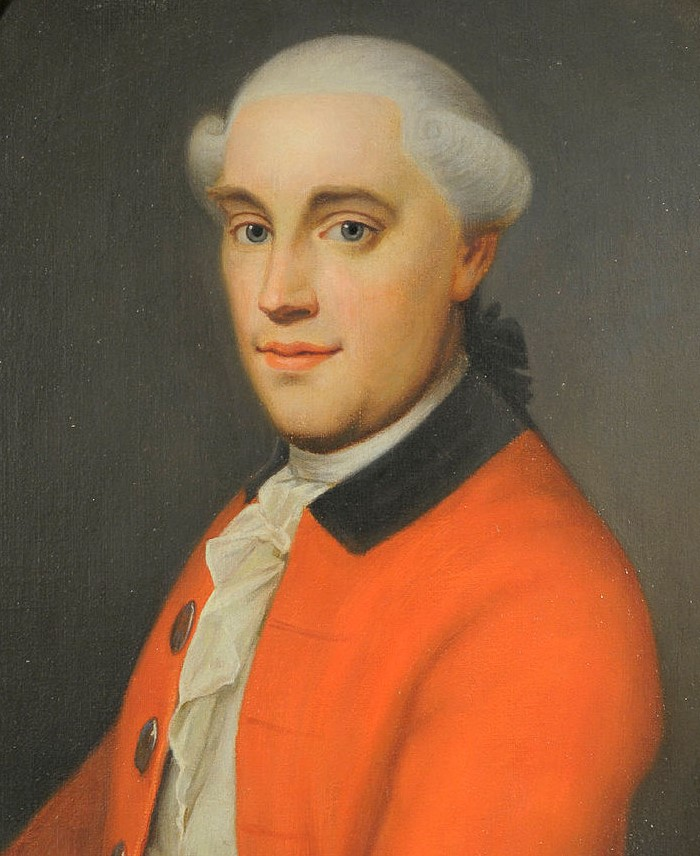
Niels Lunde Reiersen.

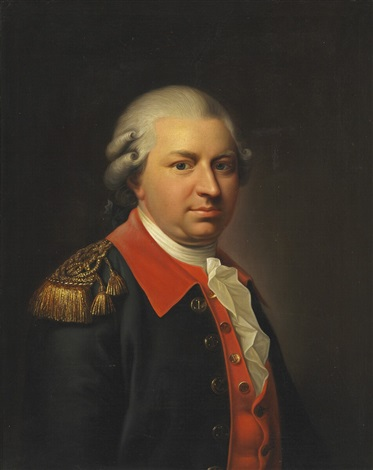
Henrik Gerner.

=== January–March ===
- 5 February – Frederik Christian Willerup, sculptor (died 1819)
- 16 February – Niels Lunde Reiersen, government official businessman (died 1795)

=== April–June ===
- 12 April – Søren Gyldendal, bookstore owner, publisher (died 1802)
- 14 June – Jens Bruun de Neergaard, judge and landowner (died 1788)

=== July–September ===
- 5 July – Henrik Gerner, naval officer and shipbuilder (died 1787)
- 9 August – Johan Christian Schønheyder, bishop (died 1803)
- 19 August – Andreas Collstrop, timber merchant and one of Copenhagen's 32 Men (died 1820)

=== October–December ===
- 7 October – Johan Zoëga, entomologist and botanist (died 1788)

== Deaths ==
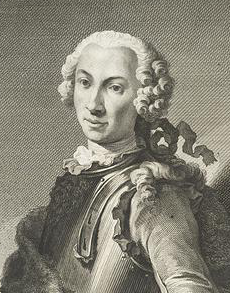
Frederic Louis Norden.

- 26 February – Knud Nielsen Benstrup, (born 1692)
- 22 September – Frederic Louis Norden, naval captain and explorer (born 1708)
- 31 December – Christian Hans von Warnstedt, county governor (born 1675)
