= 1748 in Denmark =

- Decades: 1720s; 1730s; 1740s; 1750s; 1760s
- See also: Other events of 1748; List of years in Denmark

Events from the year 1748 in Denmark.

== Incumbents ==
- Monarch – Frederick V
- Prime minister – Johan Ludvig Holstein-Ledreborg

== Events ==
- 18 December – Niels Eigtved's new theatre of Kongens Nytorv in Copenhagen opens with a repertoire of Danish plays and Italian operas.
- 27 December – Ernst Henrich Berling receives a license to publish newspapers.

=== Undated ===
- Lauritz de Thurah publishes Hafnia Hodierna.
- Frederik Christian Eilschov publishes Philosophiske Breve.
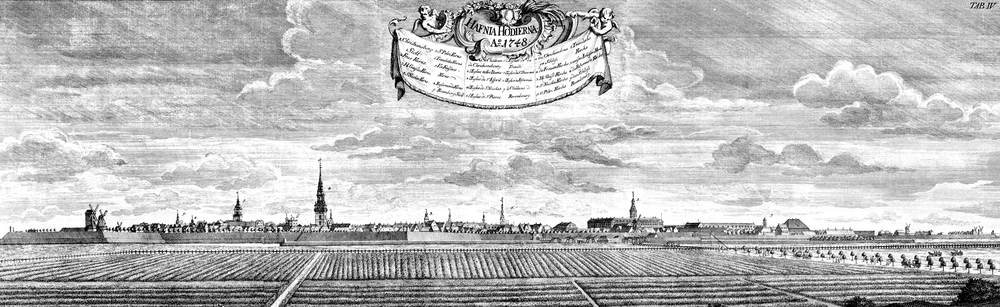
The Bernstorff Palace Gardens

== Births ==
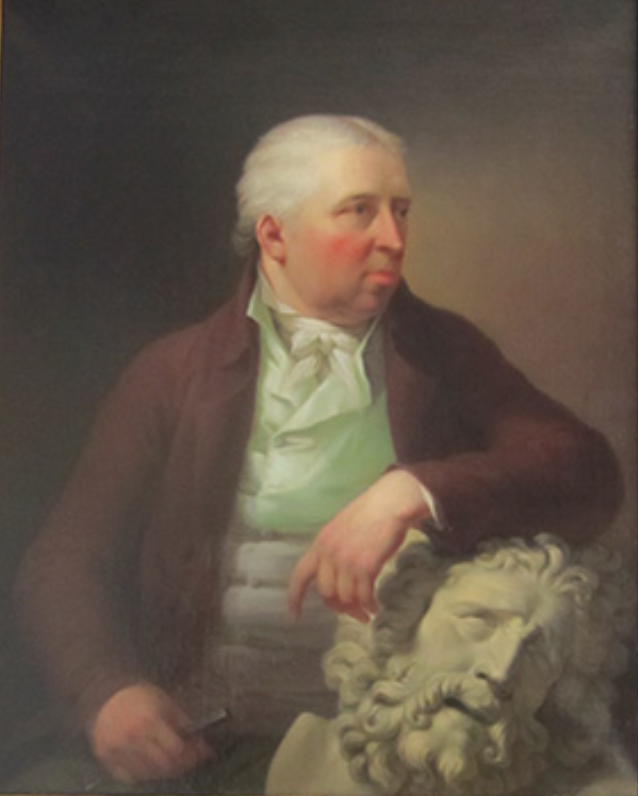
Nicolai Dajon.

- 1 January – Adam Gottlob Ferdinand Moltke, naval officer and landowner (died 1820)
- 21 January – Nicolai Dajon, architect (died 1809)
- 11 March – Christian Ditlev Frederik Reventlow, statesman and reformer (died 1827)
- Amalie Sophie Holstein, noble and courtier (died 1823)

== Deaths ==
- 19 February – Hans Gram, academic and historian (born 1685)
- 6 May – Friederich Ehbisch, sculptor (born 1672)
- 3 August – Christian Carl Gabel, vice admiral, Chief Secretary of War and Director of the Dano-Norwegian Navy and Holmen Naval Base (born 1679)
- 17 September – Valentin von Eickstedt, military officer and government official (born 1669?)
- 17 December – Niels Gersdorff, courtier and government official (born 1799)
