= 1746 in Denmark =

- Decades: 1720s; 1730s; 1740s; 1750s; 1760s
- See also: Other events of 1746; List of years in Denmark

Events from the year 1746 in Denmark.

== Incumbents ==
- Monarch – Christian VI (until 6 August), Frederick V
- Prime minister – Johan Ludvig Holstein-Ledreborg

== Events ==
- 23 March – The County of Ledreborg is established by Johan Ludvig Holstein from the manors of Ledreborg and Skullerupholm as well as Hulegården, Kornerupgård, Breientvedgården, Bonderup (sold 1764), Næsbyholm (sold 1764) and Bavelse (sold 1764).

== Births ==
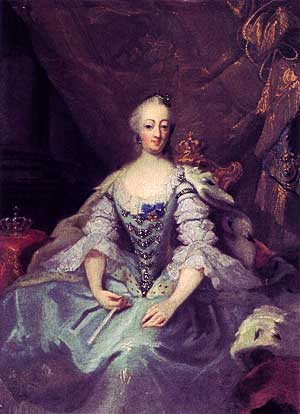
Sophia Magdalena of Denmark.

- 17 March – Adolph Tobias Herbst, naval officer (died 1825)
- 7 April – Johann Andreas Mühlensteth, pharmacist (died 1819)
- 8 May – Peter Hansen, bishop (died 1810)
- 2 July – Hardenack Otto Conrad Zinck, composer (died 1832)
- 3 July – Sophia Magdalena of Denmark, Queen consort of Sweden (died 1813 in Sweden)
- 5 August – Pierre Paul Ferdinand Mourierm Danish Asiatic Company trader and landowner (died 1836)
- 22 August – Johan Henrik Knuth, county governor and landowner (died 1802)

=== Fill date missing ===
- Hans Egede Saabye, priest and missionary (died 1817)
- Birgitte Sofie Gabel, noble and courtier (died 1769)

== Deaths ==
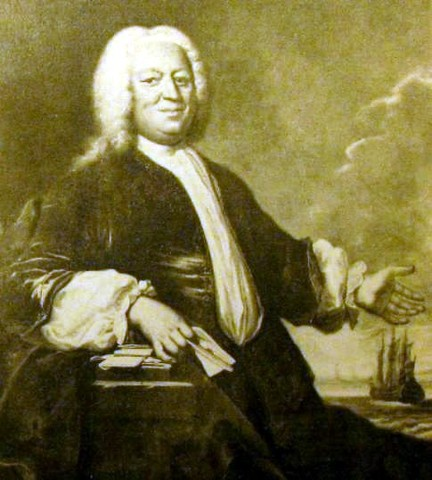
Michael Fabritius-

- 1 August – Justine Cathrine Rosenkrantz, lady-in-waiting, noble and spy (born 1659)
- 6 August – Christian VI, King of Denmark (born 1699)
- 13 November – Michael Fabritius, businessman (died 1697)
- 27 December – Ulrich Kaas, naval officer (born 1677)
