= 1827 in Denmark =

- Decades: 1800s; 1810s; 1820s; 1830s; 1840s
- See also: Other events of 1827; List of years in Denmark

Events from the year 1827 in Denmark.

== Incumbents ==
- Monarch – Frederick VI
- Prime minister – Otto Joachim

== Events ==
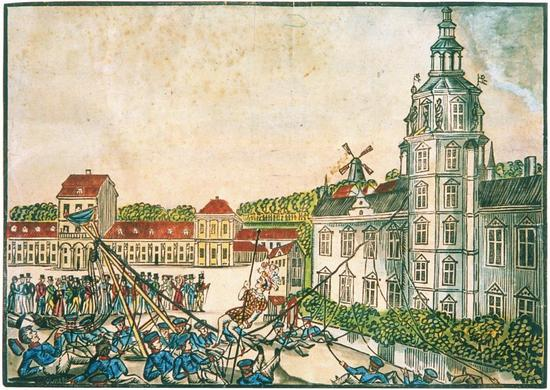
Coloured wood carving depicting the incident when Christian Roat was killed

- 1 January – Johan Ludvig Heiberg (poet) publishes the literary journal Kjøbenhavns flyvende Post for the first time.
- May – Giuseppe Siboni opens the first music conservatory in Copenhagen.
- 12 June – The Tightrope walker Christian Roat is killed during a show at Rosenborg drill grounds when his rope breaks.

=== Undated ===
- The crown acquires the Holstein Mansion in Copenhagen as a permanent home for the Natural History Museum.

== Births ==
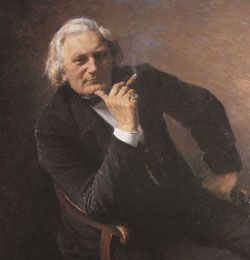
Mars Christian Holm.

=== January–March ===
- 8 February – Hans Schjellerup, astronomer (died 1887)
- 1 March – Eiler Rasmussen Eilersen, painter (died 1912)
- 16 March – Ferdinand Meldahl, architect (died 1908)
- 20 March – Johannes Forchhammer, philologist (died 1909)

=== April–June ===
- 12 May – Israel B. Melchior, photographer (died 1893)
- 2 June – Petrine Fredstrup, ballet dancer (died 1881)
- 11 June - Natalie Zahle, reform pedagogue and pioneer on women's education (died 1913)

=== October–December ===
- 7 October – Christian Frederik Lütken, zoologist ad naturalist (died 1901)
- 19 October – Mads Christian Holm, businessman, company founder (died 1892)
- 22 December – Anders Petersen (historian), historian (died 1914)

== Deaths ==
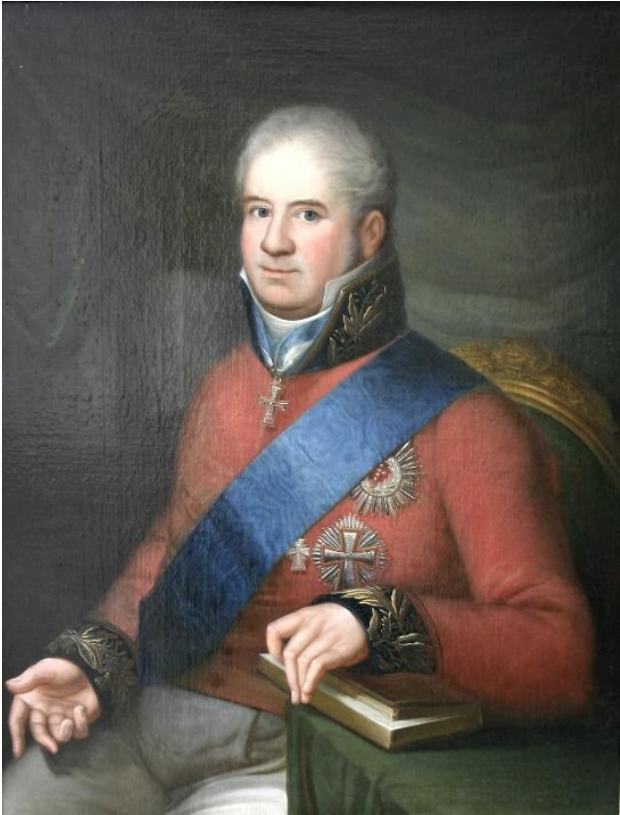
Frederik Julius Kaas.

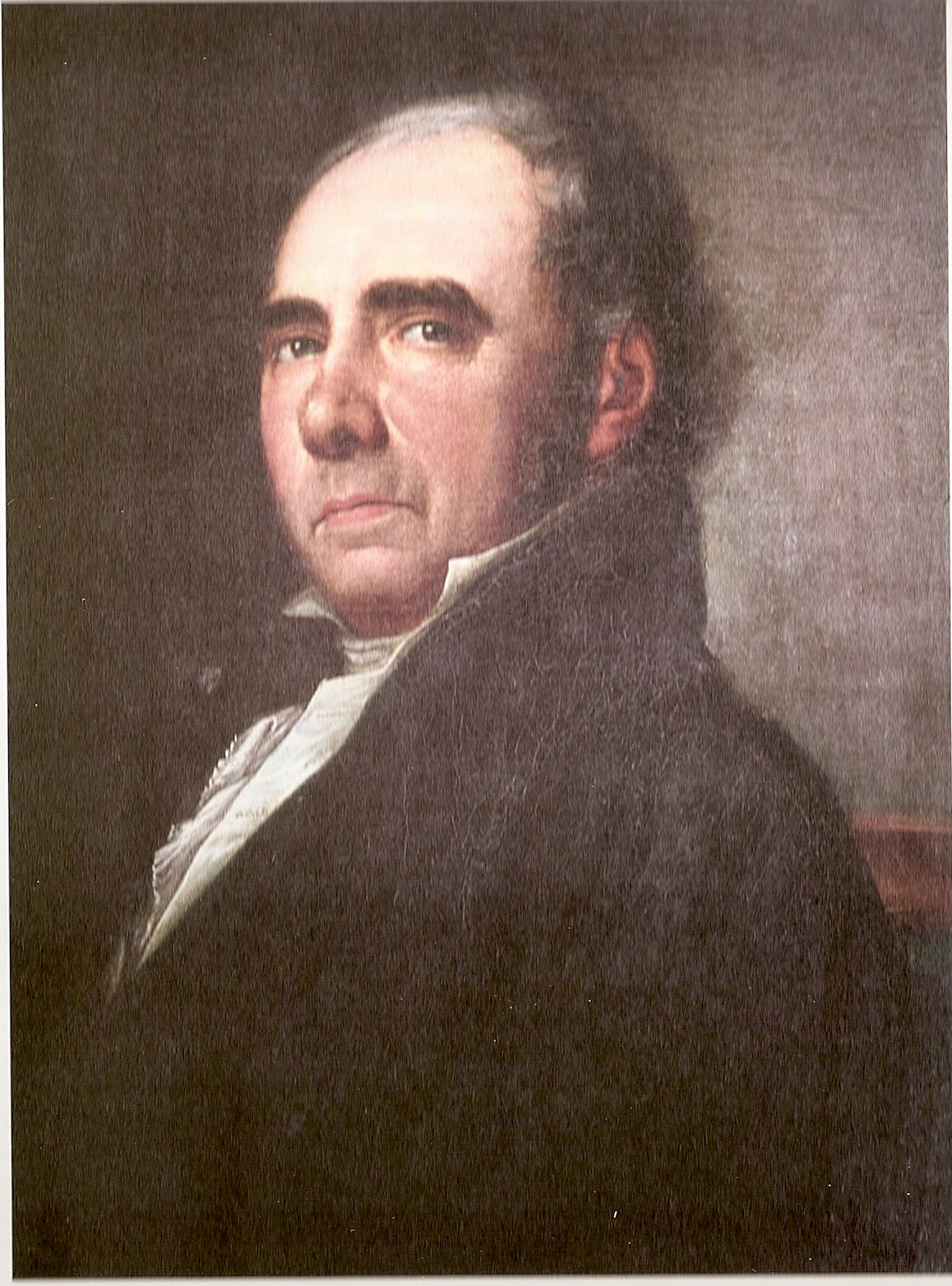
Jiseph Christian Lille.

=== January–March ===
- 11 January – Frederik Julius Kaas. prime minister (born 1758)
- 7 February – Peter Norden Sølling, naval officer (born 1758)
- 9 February – Mette Magrete Tvistman, watchmaker /born 1741)

=== April–June ===
- 29 June – Joseph Christian Lillie, architect and interior designer (born 187+)

=== July–September ===
- 4 July – Christian Kyhl, gunsmith (born 1762)
- 3 September – Adam Ditlev Wedell-Wedellsborg, government official (born 1782)
- 12 September – Peter Nicolaj Arbo, businessman and landowner (born 1768)
- 19 September – Morten Thrane Brünnich, zoologist and mineralogist (born 1737)

=== October–December ===
- 11 October – Christian Ditlev Frederik Reventlow, statesman and reformer (born 1748)
- Marie Barch, first native Danish ballerina (born 1744)
