= 1762 in Denmark =

- Decades: 1740s; 1750s; 1760s; 1770s; 1780s
- See also: Other events of 1762; List of years in Denmark

Events from the year 1762 in Denmark.

== Incumbents ==
- Monarch – Frederick V
- Prime minister – Johan Ludvig Holstein-Ledreborg

== Events ==
February

- 10 February - The Guard Hussars regiment is founded.

April

- 2 April – The Chinaman Dronning Sophia Magdalena is launched at the Danish Asiatic Company's own shipyard in Copenhagen.

== Births ==
- 16 January – Birgithe Kühle, hournalist (died 1832)
- 13 March – Anine Frølich, ballet dancer (died 1784)
- 3 September – Christian Kyhl, gunsmith (died 1827)

=== Full date missing ===
- Peder Schall, musician and composer (died 1820)

== Deaths ==
- 26 May – Claus Paarss, military officer and governor og Greenland (born 1683)
- 3 December – Povl Badstuber, coppersmith and industrialist born 1685)
