= 1685 in Denmark =

- Decades: 1660s; 1670s; 1680s; 1690s; 1700s
- See also: Other events of 1685; List of years in Denmark

Events from the year 1685 in Denmark.

== Incumbents ==
- Monarch – Christian V
- Grand Chancellor – Frederik Ahlefeldt

== Events ==
- 16 April – Fort Frederiksborg is sold to the English.
- 19 May – Leonora Christina Ulfeldt is released after twenty-two years in confinement in Blåtårn.
- September – a woman named Mette is put on trial for witchcraft in Ebeltoft, beginning the Rugård witch trials.
- 3 October – The County of Reventlow is established by Conrad von Reventlow from the manors of Sandbjerg and Ballegård as well as the farm Bøgskov.

=== Undated ===
- The Brandenburg Colony is established on St. Thomas in the Danish West Indies.
- Encouraged by his queen, Christian V licensed the formation of a reformed congregation among German, Dutch and French immigrants.

== Births ==
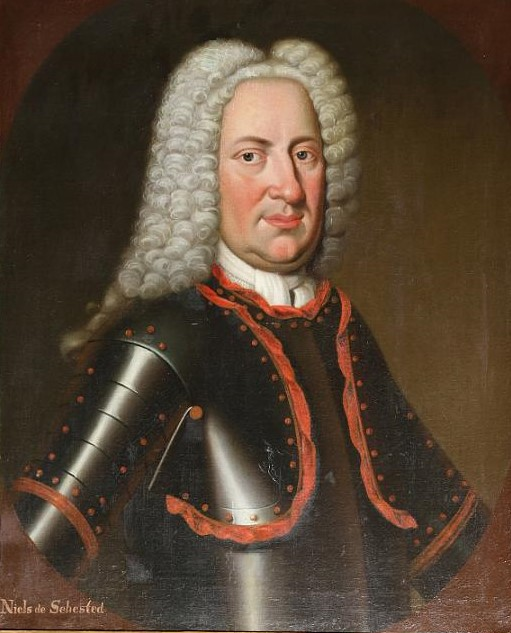
Niels Sehested.

- 17 March – Niels Sehested (died 1745)

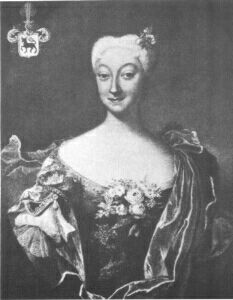
Charlotte Amalie Skeel.

- 1 April – Charlotte Amalie Skeel, noblewoman (died 1729)
- 28 October – Hans Gram, historian (died 1748)

=== Full date missing ===
- Povl Badstuber, coppersmith and industrialist (died 1762)

== Deaths ==
11 January – Jørgen Erik Skeel Jørgen Erik Skeel, prime minister of Denmark (born 1737)

- 29 January – Ove Ramel, landowner (born 1637)
- 20 February – Queen Sophie Amalie, Queen of Denmark (born 1628)
- 10 June – Peder Lauridsen Scavenius, jurist, civil servant, rector and landowner (born 1623)
- 23 August – Ludvig Rosenkrantz, nobleman (born 1628)

== Publications ==
- Peder Syv': Den Danske Sprog-Kunst ("The Danish Language-Art")
- Peder Hansen Resen: Petri Johannis Resenii Bibliotheca Regiæ Academiæ Hafniensi Donata Cui Præfixa Est Ejusdem Resenii Vita
