= 1758 in Denmark =

- Decades: 1730s; 1740s; 1750s; 1760s; 1770s
- See also: Other events of 1758; List of years in Denmark

Events from the year 1758 in Denmark.

== Incumbents ==
- Monarch – Frederick V
- Prime minister – Johan Ludvig Holstein-Ledreborg

== Events ==
=== Undated ===
- The ballet dancers Marie Barch and Carl Vilhelm Barch debut at the Royal Danish Theater in Copenhagen as the first native ballet dancers.

== Births ==
- 21 January – Frederik Harboe, naval officer (died 1811)

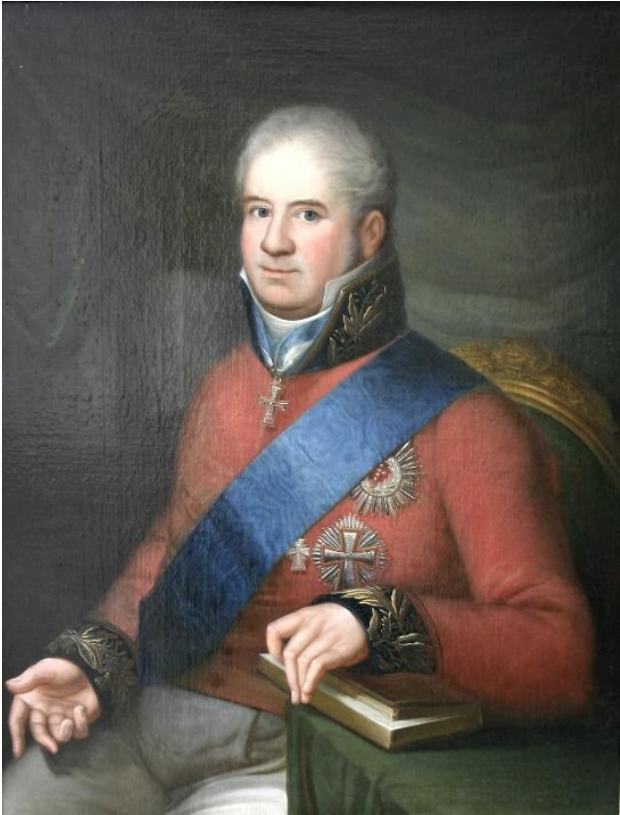
Frederik Julius Kaas.

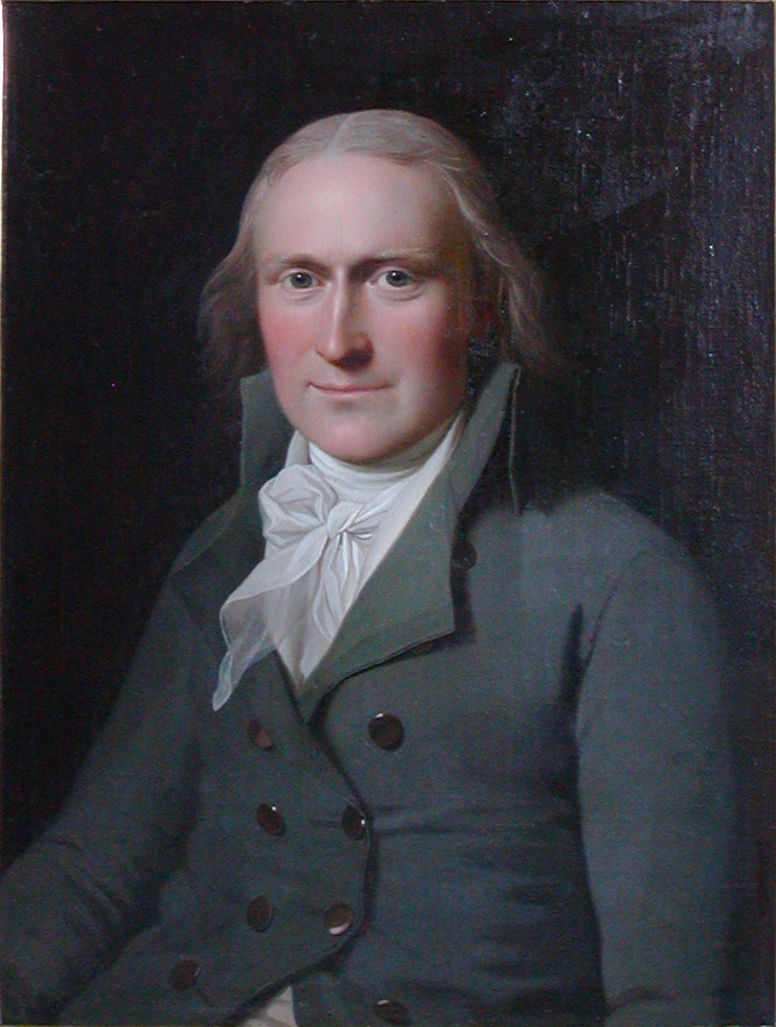
Peter Andreas Heiberg.

- 7 June – Peter Mandrup Lem, violinist (died 1828)
- 24 August – Frederik Julius Kaas, prime minister (died 1827)
- 13 September – Peter Norden Sølling (died 1827)
- 6 November – Andreas Birch, academic, bishop (died 1829)
- 16 November – Peter Andreas Heiberg, author (died 1841)
- 4 October – Frederik Julius Bech, bishop (died 1922 in Norway)

== Deaths ==
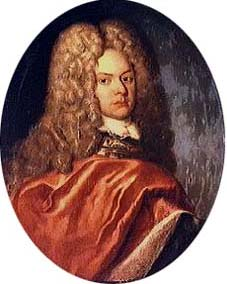
Carl Adolph von Plessen.

- 30 January – Carl Adolph von Plessen, statesman (born 1678 in Mecklenburg)
- 5 February – Anthoni Raff, burgermaster and businessman (died 1692(
- 19 May – Claus Reventlow, judge (born 1694)
- 15 July – Ambrosius Stub, poet (born 1705)
- 5 November – Hans Egede, missionary (born 1686)
