= 1819 in Denmark =

- Decades: 1790s; 1800s; 1810s; 1820s; 1830s
- See also: Other events of 1819; List of years in Denmark

Events from the year 1819 in Denmark.

== Incumbents ==
- Monarch – Frederick VI

== Events ==
=== September ===
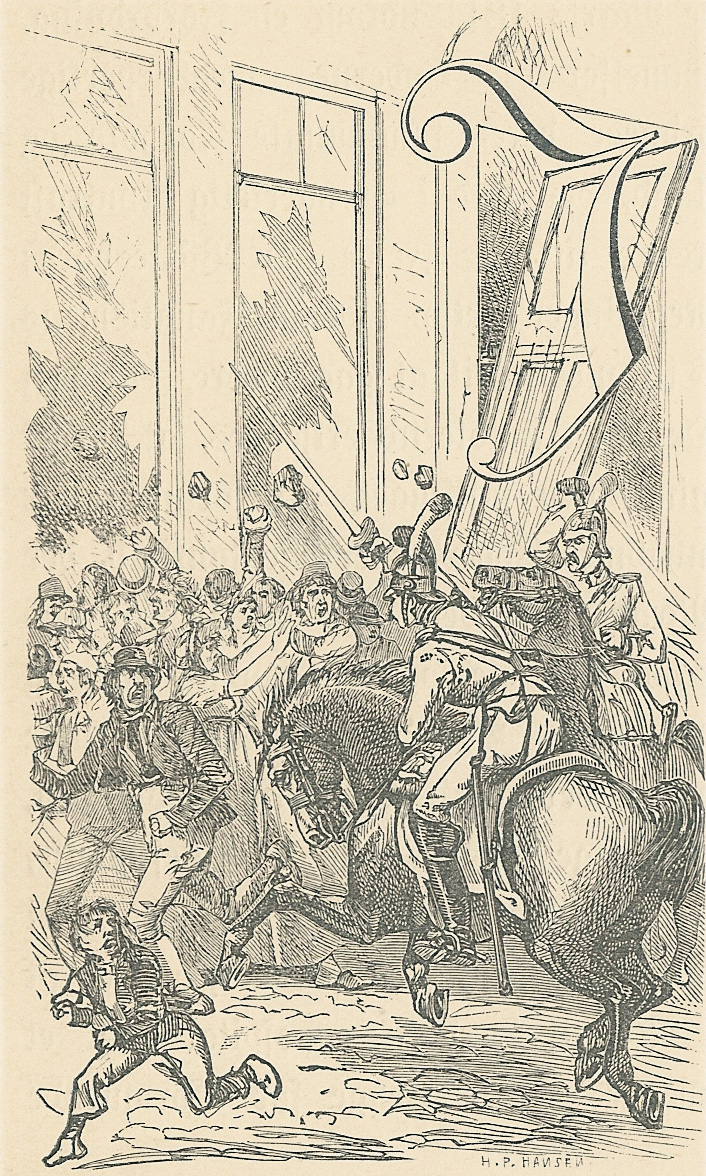
Antisemitic riots: The mob is throwing rocks at the clothes shop owned by the brothers Raphael in Østergade, while the hussars are charging..

- 5 September - Hans Christian Andersen arrives in Copenhagen for the first time.
- September – Antisemitic riots in Copenhagen.

=== Undated ===
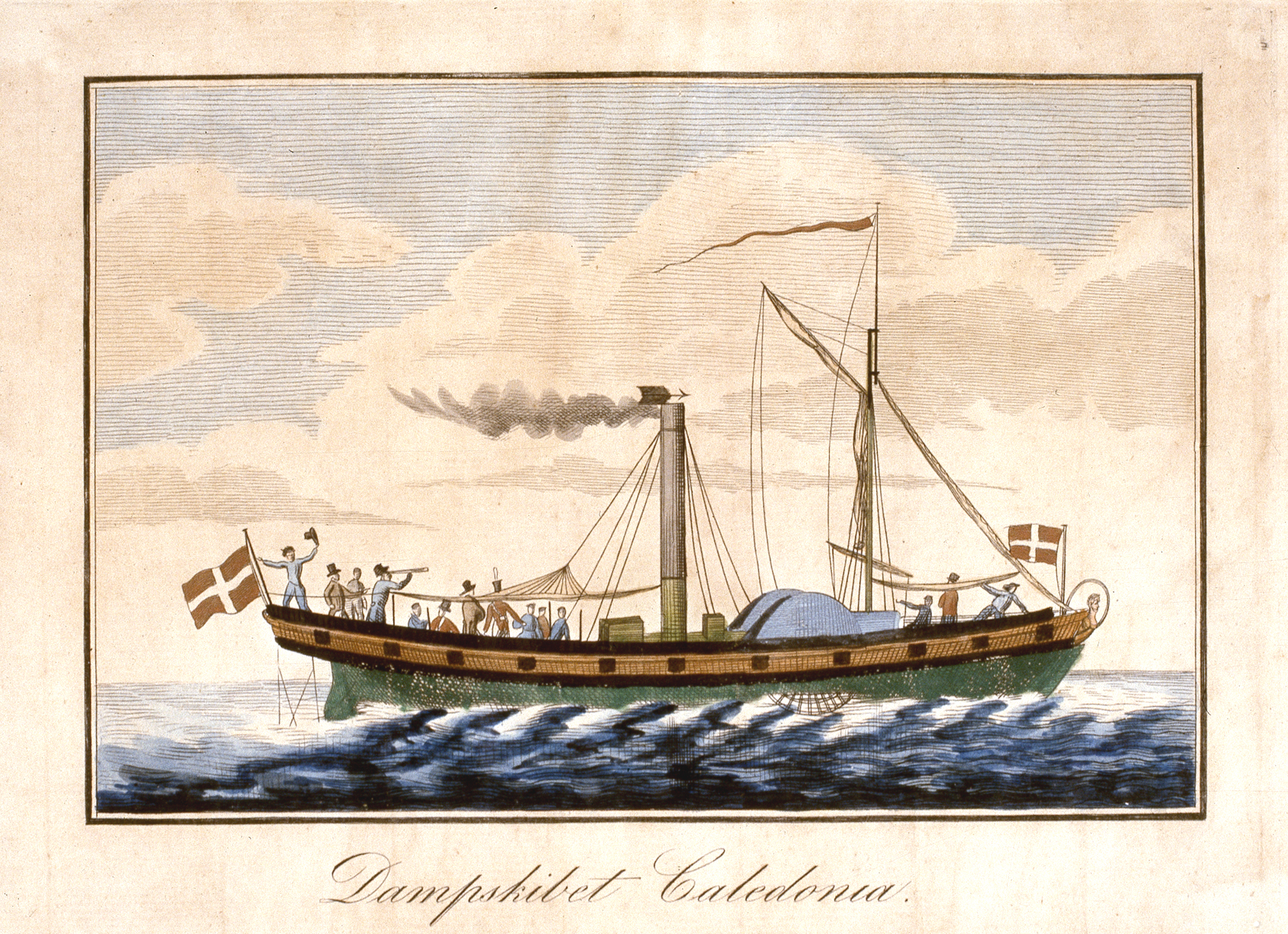
Caledonia

- Denmark's first steamship, SS Caledonia, a paddle steamer bought used in England, begins operations as a mail steamer between Copenhagen and Kiel.
- Several Antisemitic riots occur in Copenhagen.

== Births ==
=== January–March ===
- 30 March – Vilhelm Kyhn, painter and educator (died 1903 in Rome)

=== April–June ===
- 20 May – Pietro Boyesen, photographer (died 1882 in Italt)
- 18 June – Niels Frederik Ravn, politician (born 1826)

=== July–September ===
- 26 August – Hinrich Johannes Rink, geologist (died 1893)
- 5 September – Peter Schram, opera singer and actor (died 1895)

=== October–December ===
- 26 October – Meïr Aron Goldschmidt, journalist, publisher and novelist (born 1887)
- 4 November – Kristian Mantzius, actor (died 1879)

== Deaths ==
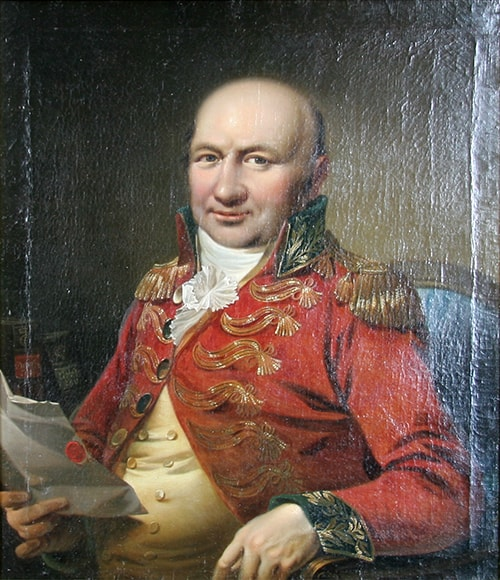
Rasmus Langeland Bagger.

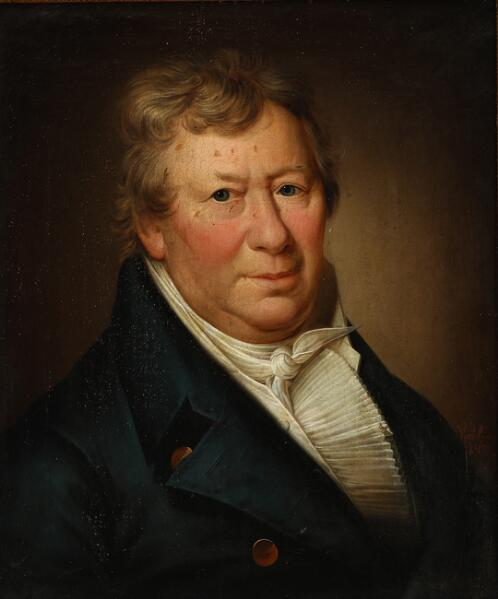
Johan Jacob Pingel.

=== January–March ===
- 11 January – Johann Andreas Mühlensteth, pharmacist (died 1746)
- 20 January – Rasmus Langeland Bagger, chief of police and burgermaster in Copenhagen (born 1764)
- 20 March – Mette Marie Rose, stage actor (born 1745)

=== April–June ===
- 7 May – Frederik Christian Willerup, sculptor (born 1742)
- 15 May – Arnoldus von Falkenskiold, colonel (born 1743)

=== October–December ===
- 4 December – Johan Joachim Pingel, cabinetmaker (born 1752)
