= 1747 in Denmark =

- Decades: 1720s; 1730s; 1740s; 1750s; 1760s
- See also: Other events of 1747; List of years in Denmark

Events from the year 1747 in Denmark.

== Incumbents ==
- Monarch – Frederick V
- Prime minister – Johan Ludvig Holstein-Ledreborg

== Events ==
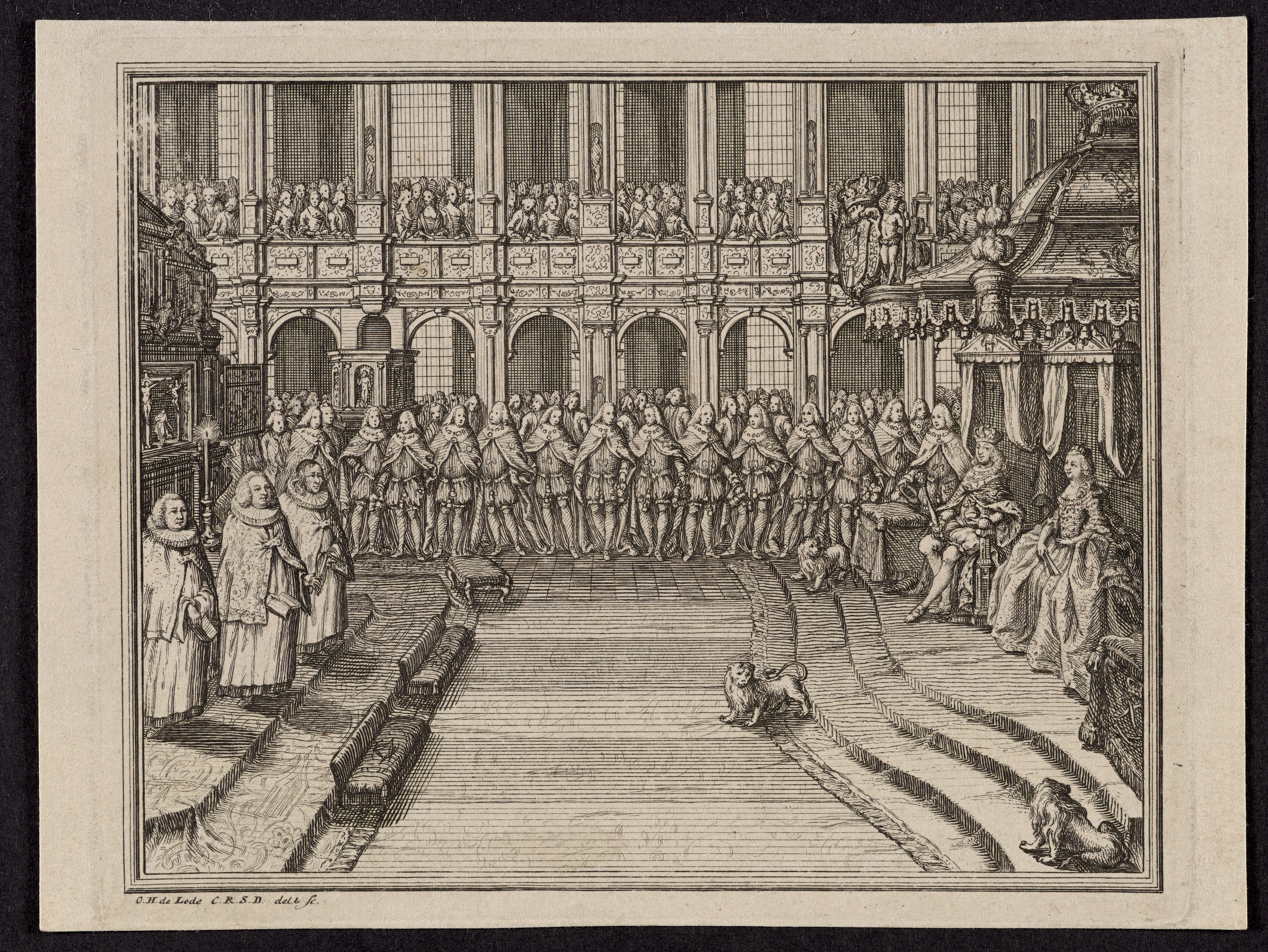
4 September: The coronation of Frederick V of Denmark at Frederiksborg Chapel.

- 4 September – The coronation of Frederick V of Denmark at Frederiksborg Chapel.

=== Date unknown ===
- Count Adam Gottlob Moltke was made a privy councillor by Frederick V, who gave him the estate of Bregentved.
- Skagen's first lighthouse is inaugurated to designs by Philip de Lange.
- Frederiksdal House is completed as the earliest example of a maison de plaisance in Denmark.

== Births ==
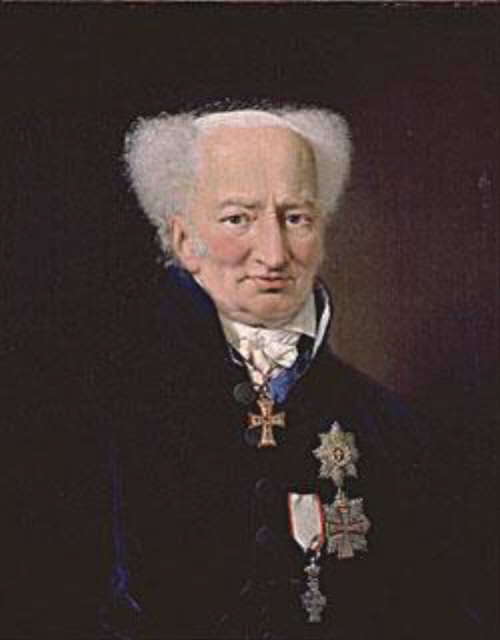
Ernst Heinrich von Schimmelmann.

- 5 January – Frederik Ludvig Bang, physician (died 1820)
- 10 July – Princess Wilhelmina Caroline of Denmark, electress of Hesse-Kassel (died 1820 in Germany)
- 8 September – Rasmus Kirketerp, busiessman (died 1830)
- 4 August – Olfert Fischer, vice admiral (died 1829)
- 4 December – Ernst Heinrich von Schimmelmann, politician, businessman and patron (died 1831)

== Deaths ==
- 30 December – Johan Conrad Wodroff, naval officer (born 1690)
