= 1692 in Denmark =

- Decades: 1670s; 1680s; 1690s; 1700s; 1710s
- See also: Other events of 1692; List of years in Denmark

Events from the year 1692 in Denmark

== Incumbents ==
- Monarch – Christian V

== Events ==
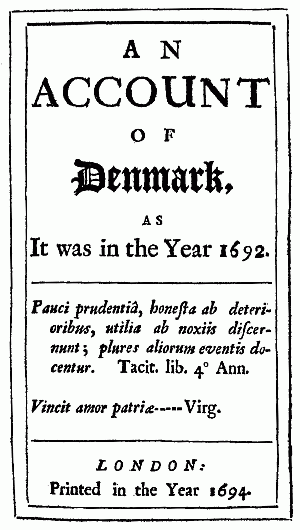
An Account of Denmark, as it was in the Year 1692, published by former British ambassador to Copenhagen Robert Molesworth

- 23 April – A royal order for the establishment of Sankt Annæ Plads is issued.
- 4 September – The Royal Knight Academy in Copenhagen is established as a replacement for the closed Sorø Academy.
- 2 November – Anne Palles is convicted of witchcraft and sentenced to death. The execution of her takes place on 4 April 1693. She becomes the last person executed for witchcraft in Denmark.
- 10 December – Ole Judichær becomes the first factory director of the new Royal Danish Naval Dockyard at Nyholm in Copenhagen. (died 1729)

=== Full date missing ===
- Knud Nielsen Benstrup, naval officer (died 1842)
- Robert Molesworth, 1st Viscount Molesworth serves as British ambassador to Denmark, a stay which will eventually result in his publication of An Account of Denmark, as it was in the Year 1692 (1694).

== Births ==
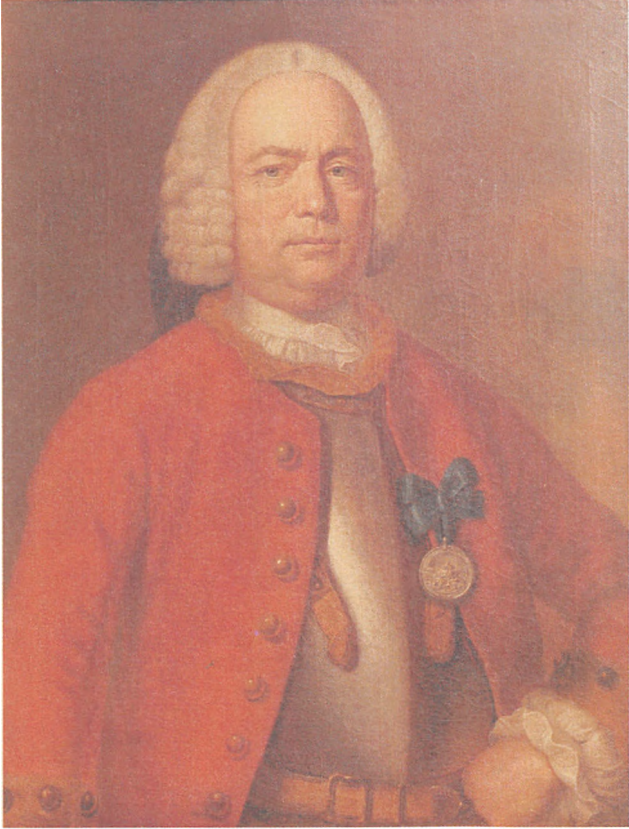
Christian Peter Flensborg,

- 22 January – Christian Peter Flensborg, naval officer (died 1767)
- 18 July – Anthoni Raff, burgermaster and businessman (died 1758(
- 16 October – Herman Henrik Kønneman, businessman and politician (died 1771)

=== Undated ===
- Knud Nielsen Benstrup, naval officer and shuobuilder (died 1742)
- Nathanael Diesel, composer (died 1745)
- Nathanael Diesel, composer (died 1745)
- Marie Madeleine de Montaigu, actress (died 1736)

== Deaths ==
- 25 April – Gysbert Wigand Michelbecker, merchant and shipowner (born 1636 in Germany)

=== Full date missing ===
- Abraham-César Lamoureux, sculptor (born 1640 in Denmark)
- Juliane Elisabeth von Wallenstein, lady-in-waiting (born 1618)
