= 1688 in Denmark =

- Decades: 1660s; 1670s; 1680s; 1690s; 1700s
- See also: Other events of 1688; List of years in Denmark

Events from the year 1688 in Denmark.

== Incumbents ==
- Monarch – Christian V

== Events ==
- 3 August – the Royal Pawn is created by royal ordinance.

== Births ==
- 31 October – Jacob Benzon, nobleman and Governor-general of Norway (died 1775)

=== Gull date missing ===
- Ismael Mengs, painter (died 1874 in Dresden)

== Deaths ==
- 1 June
  - Peder Hansen Resen, historian (born 1625)
  - Nicolai Esmit, Governor of the Danish West Indies
- 4 August – Sophie Amalie Lindenov, noblewoman and landowner (born 1649)
