= 1687 in Denmark =

- Decades: 1660s; 1670s; 1680s; 1690s; 1700s
- See also: Other events of 1687; List of years in Denmark

Events from the year 1687 in Denmark.

== Incumbents ==
- Monarch – Christian V
- Grand Chancellor – Frederik Ahlefeldt

== Events ==
- March – Adolph Esmit succeeds Christopher Heins as Governors of St. Thomas and St. John.
- 9 July – The Copenhagen Royal Fire Brigade os founded.

=== Undated ===
- The Krudttårnet gunpowder magazine is constructed in Frederikshavn.
- Hofmarschall Henrik Ulrik Lützow's town mansion is constructed on Stormgade in Copenhagen.
- Abraham Salomon becomes the first rabbi in Copenhagen. From 1766 until 1795, around 1,500 Jews worshipped in a small synagogue until it burned down.

== Births ==
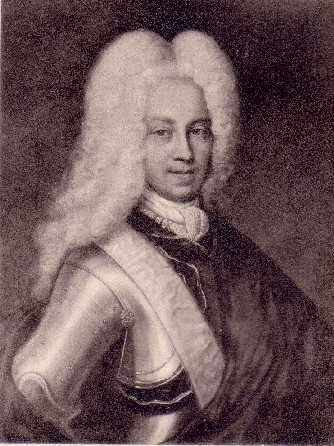
Adam Christopher Knuth.

- 21 February – Prince William of Denmark, prince (died 1705)
- 21 July – Lars Benzon, judge and landowner (died 1741)
- 23 September – Adam Christopher Knuth, 1st Count of Knuthenborg (died 1736)

== Deaths ==
- 3 February – Bernhard Keil, painter (born 1624)
- 17 March Dorothea Elisabeth Christiansdatter, princess (born 1629)
