= 1743 in Denmark =

- Decades: 1720s; 1730s; 1740s; 1750s; 1760s
- See also: Other events of 1743; List of years in Denmark

Events from the year 1743 in Denmark.

== Incumbents ==
- Monarch – Christian VI
- Prime minister – Johan Ludvig Holstein-Ledreborg

== Events ==
August

- 2 August
  - The Barony of Christiansdal is established by Ide Margrethe Reventlow from the manors of Adserstrup and Grimsted.
  - The Barony of Conradsborg is established by Ide Margrethe Reventlow for her son Christian Frederik Knuth from the manors of Sørup, Sandbygård and Rosengård.

December

- 11 December – The wedding of Crown Prince Frederick (V) and Louise of Great Britain is celebrated at Christiansborg Palace. The couple had already been married by proxy on 10 November in Hanover.
- 30 December – Christian VI grants Johan Sigismund Schulin the Frederiksdal estate north of Copenhagen as a New Year present.

=== Undated ===
- Adam Gottlob Moltke assumes the post of Court Marshal, secured for him by crown prince Frederick, later King Frederick V.

== Births ==
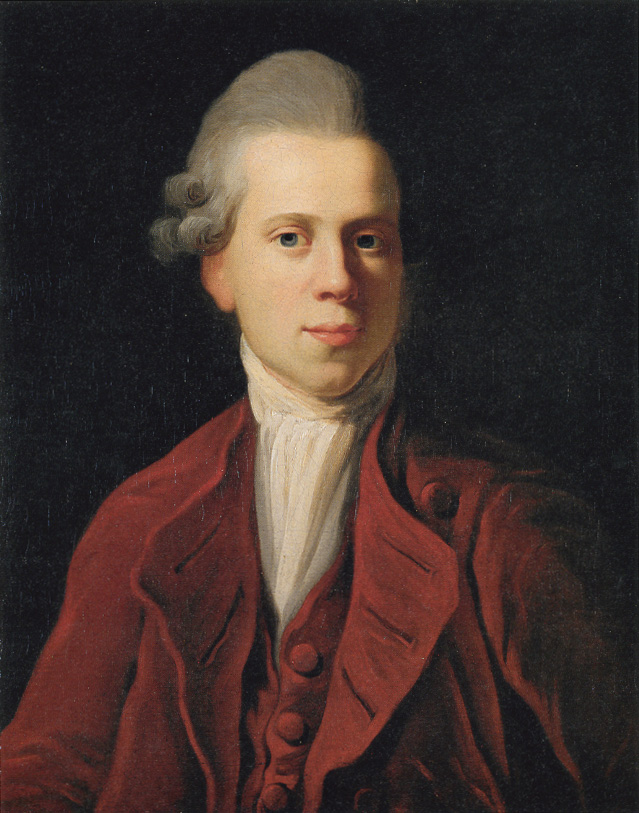
Nicolai Abraham Abildgaard.

- 11 June – Arnoldus von Falkenskiold, colonel (died 1819)
- 28 June – Peter Uldall, Supreme Court attorbey, Public Prosecutor General and burgermaster (died 1798)
- September 11 – Nikolaj Abraham Abildgaard, painter (died 1809)
- c. 1 October – Hans Peder Kofoed, businessman (died 1812)
- October 2 or 14 – Erik Pauelsen, painter (died 1790)
- 18 November – Johannes Ewald, dramatist, poet (died 1781)
- November 29 – Joachim Castenschiold, military officer (died 1817)

== Deaths ==
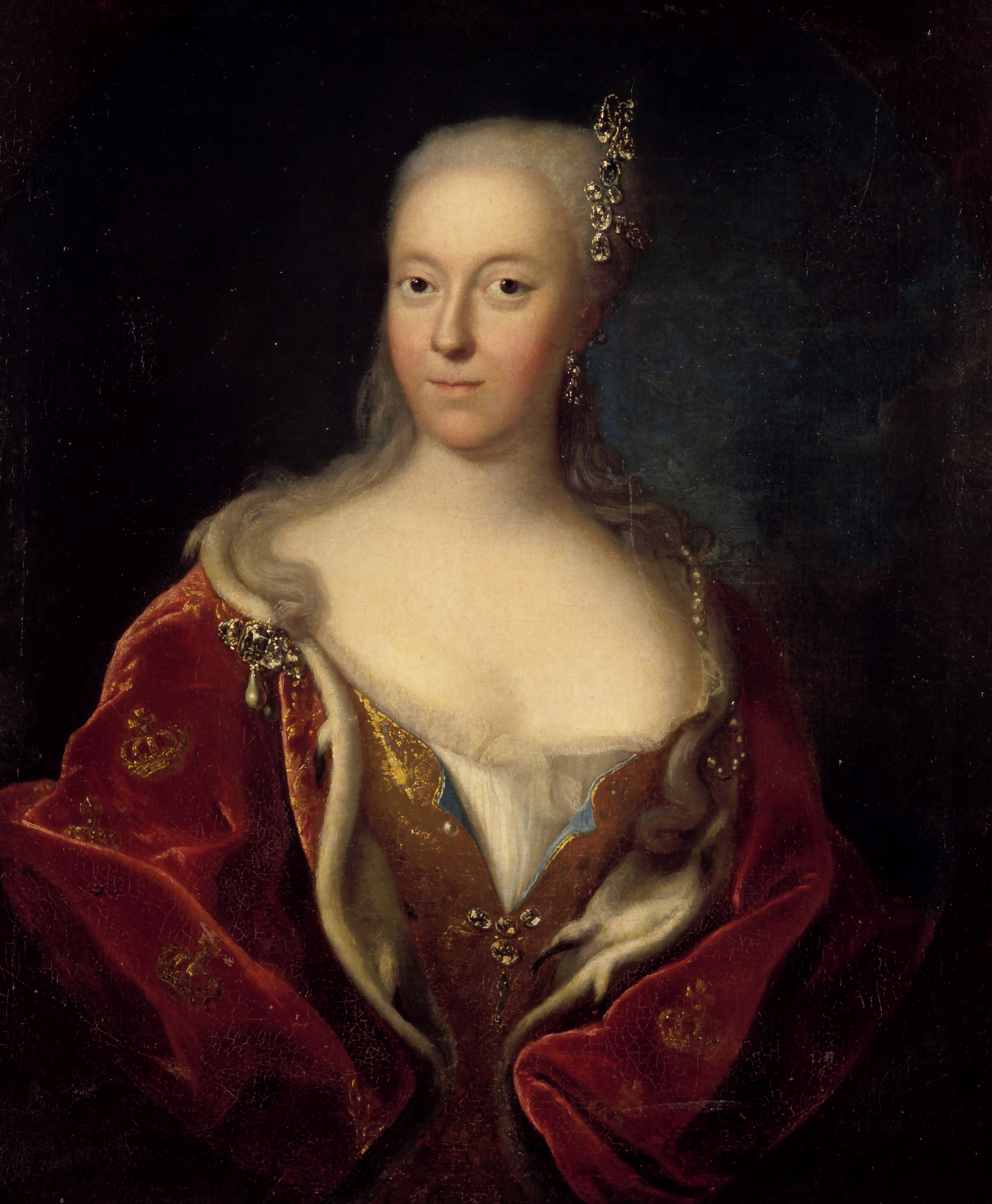
Anne Sophie Reventlow.

- January 7 – Anne Sophie Reventlow, royal mistress, spouse by bigamy, later queen consort (born 1693)
