= 1740 in Denmark =

- Decades: 1720s; 1730s; 1740s; 1750s; 1760s
- See also: Other events of 1740; List of years in Denmark

Events from the year 1740 in Denmark.

== Incumbents ==
- Monarch – Christian VI
- Prime minister – Johan Ludvig Holstein-Ledreborg

== Events ==
- The watchmaking company Jules Jurgensen is established.

== Births ==
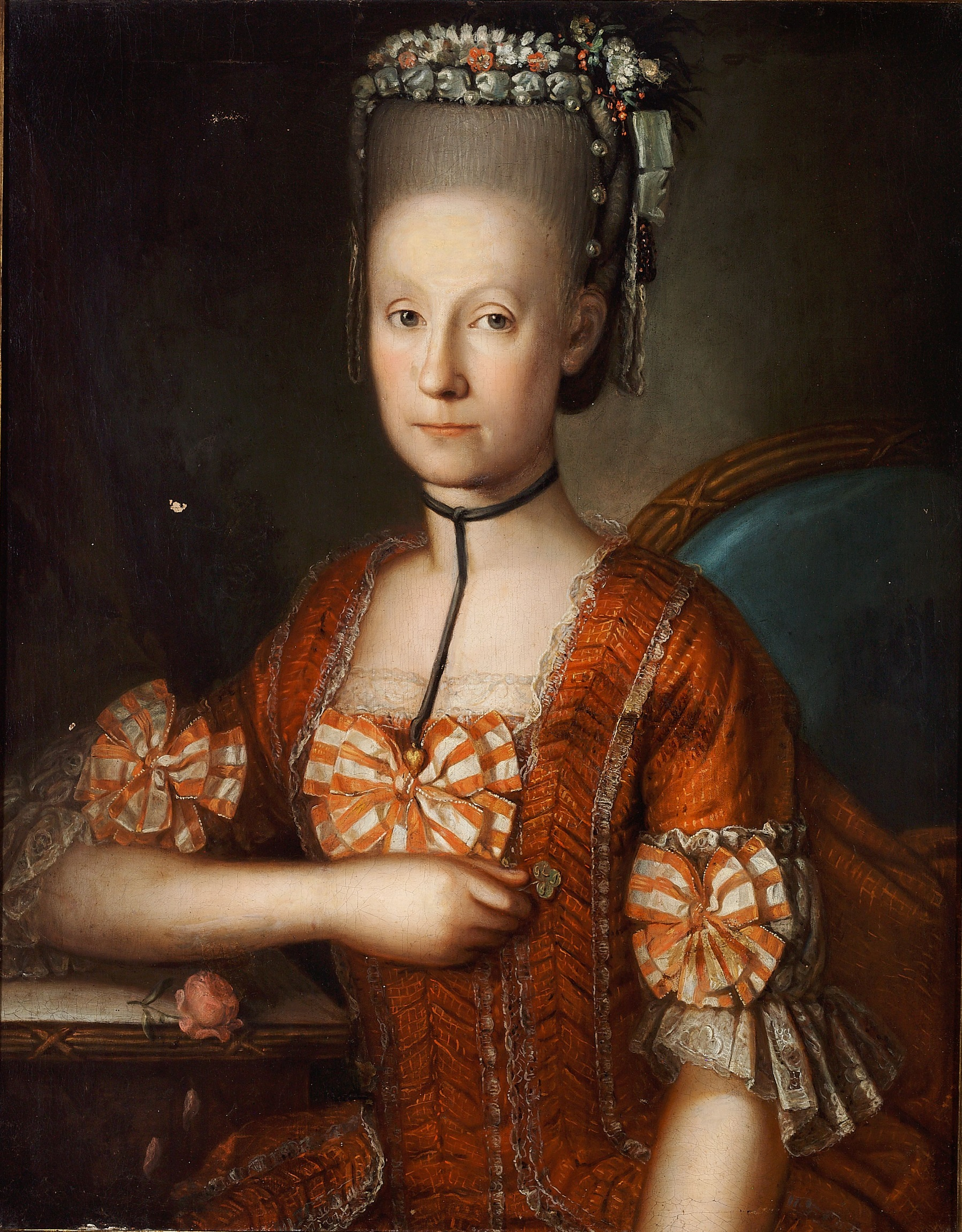
Charlotte Baden.

- 12 October – Thomas Bugge, astronomer and surveyor (died 1815)
- 21 November – Charlotte Baden, writer (died 1824)

=== Undated ===
- Carl Adolph Castenschiold, landowner and chamberlain, born in the Danish West Indies (died 1820)
- Hedevig Johanne Bagger, businesswoman (died 1822)
- Jürgen Jurgensen's clockmaking company is founded.

== Deaths ==
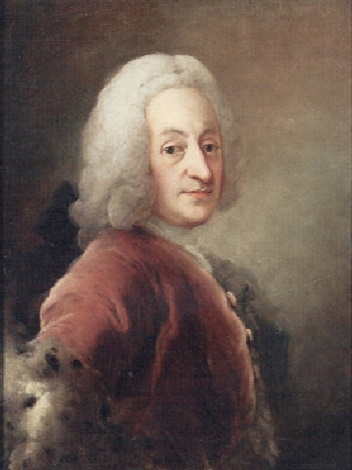
Hans Seidelin.

- 19 January – Hans Seidelin, civil servant and landowner (born 1665)
- 27 February – Poul Vendelbo Løvenørn, Secretary of War and Minister of the Navy (born 1686)
- 19 July – Christian Christophersen Sehested, nobleman (born 1666)

=== Undated ===
- Poul Christian Schindler, composer (born c. 1648)
