= 1690 in Denmark =

- Decades: 1670s; 1680s; 1690s; 1700s; 1710s
- See also: Other events of 1690; List of years in Denmark

Events from the year 1690 in Denmark

== Incumbents ==
- Monarch – Christian V

== Events ==
- 9 April – Christian V approves the creation of Nyholm as a new home for Royal Dockyard.
- 24 June – Riots between sailors and soldiers break out in Copenhagen on Saint John's Eve.

=== Full date missing ===
- Kallebobro, the predecessor of Langebro, is completed in Copenhagen.

== Births ==
- 1 January – Christian Falster, poet and philologist (died 1752)
- 17 January – Peter Schnitler, jurist and military officer (died 1751)
- 4 August – Johan Conrad Wodroff, naval officer (died 1747)

=== Full date missing ===
- Charlotte Helene von Schindel, lady in waiting and royal mistress (died 1752)

== Deaths ==
- March – Bendix Grodtschilling, artist (born c. 1620)
- 1 May – Michael Vibe, judge (born 1627)

=== Full date missing ===
- March – Bendix Grodtschillingm painter (born c. 1620)
- Ole Borch, scientist (born 1626)
