= 1741 in Denmark =

- Decades: 1720s; 1730s; 1740s; 1750s; 1760s
- See also: Other events of 1741; List of years in Denmark

Events from the year 1741 in Denmark.

== Incumbents ==
- Monarch – Christian VI
- Prime minister – Johan Ludvig Holstein-Ledreborg

== Events ==
- 13 January – The Conventicle Act of 1741 is enacted.
- 6 May – HDMS Elephanten is launched at the Royal Danish Dockyard.

Undated

The Copenhagen Stocks House is opened to civilian prisoners.

== Culture ==
- Ludvig Holberg's Niels Klim's Underground Travels is published.

== Births ==
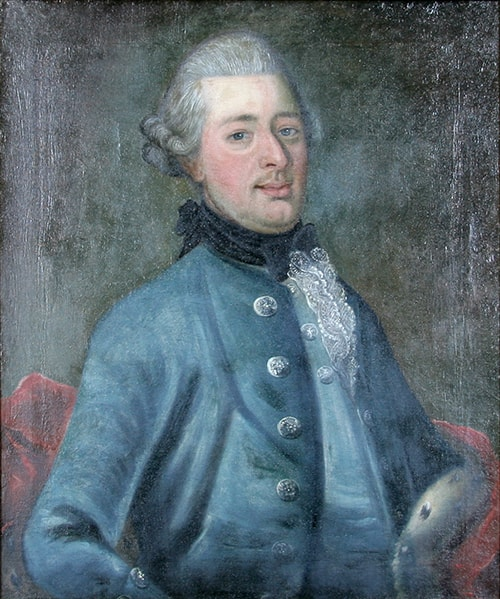
Johan Thomas Flindt.

- 3 February – Charlotte Elisabeth Henriette Holstein, courtier (died 1809)
- 16 February – Margrethe von der Lühe, courtier (died 1826)
- 8 October – Johan Thomas Flindt, chief of police in Copenhagen (died 1805)

=== Full date unknown ===
- Cornelius Høyer, miniatures painter (died 1804)
- Mette Magrete Tvistman, warchmaker (died 1827)

== Deaths ==
- 26 March – Friedrich von Gram, Chief Forester and county governor (born 1667)
