= 1784 in Denmark =

- Decades: 1760s; 1770s; 1780s; 1790s; 1800s
- See also: Other events of 1784; List of years in Denmark

Events from the year 1784 in Denmark.

== Incumbents ==
- Monarch – Christian VII
- Prime minister – Ove Høegh-Guldberg, Andreas Peter Bernstorff

== Events ==
- 17 September – The Barony of Guldborgland is established by Poul Abraham Lehn from the manors of Orebygård and Berritzgaard.
- 26 November – The County of Muckadell is established by Albrecht Christopher Schaffalitzky de Muckadell (1720-1797) from the manors of Arreskov, Brobygård (including Olstedgård) and Gelskov.

== Births ==
- 17 January – Moses DelBanco, lawyer (died 1848)
- 6 August – Poul Elias Windtmil Schlegel, surgeon and physician (died 1849)

== Deaths ==
- 7 November – Carl Adolph Raben, court official, county governor and landowner (born 1744)
- 5 October – Bendix Lasson Bille, naval officer (born 1723)
- 6 November – Anine Frølich, ballet dancer (died 1784)
- 26 December – Otto Friedrich Müller, naturalist (born 1762)
