= 1691 in Denmark =

- Decades: 1670s; 1680s; 1690s; 1700s; 1710s
- See also: Other events of 1691; List of years in Denmark

Events from the year 1691 in Denmark

== Incumbents ==
- Monarch – Christian V

== Events ==
- 10 November – A new dock is inaugurated at the Royal Naval Shipyard at Bremerholm.

== Undated ==
- The Danish government gives up its policy of import restrictions as a result of pressure from the Netherlands.
- Nygade in Copenhagen is created as a result of a fire in 1685.
- Taphus on St. Thomas in the Danish West Indies is renamed to Amalienborg.

== Births ==
- 27 October – Jacob Severin, merchant (died 1753)

=== Full date missing ===
- Ulrik Christian Nissen. government official (died 1756)
