= 1787 in Denmark =

- Decades: 1760s; 1770s; 1780s; 1790s; 1800s
- See also: Other events of 1787; List of years in Denmark

Events from the year 1787 in Denmark.

== Incumbents ==
- Monarch – Christian VII
- Prime minister – Andreas Peter Bernstorff

== Events ==
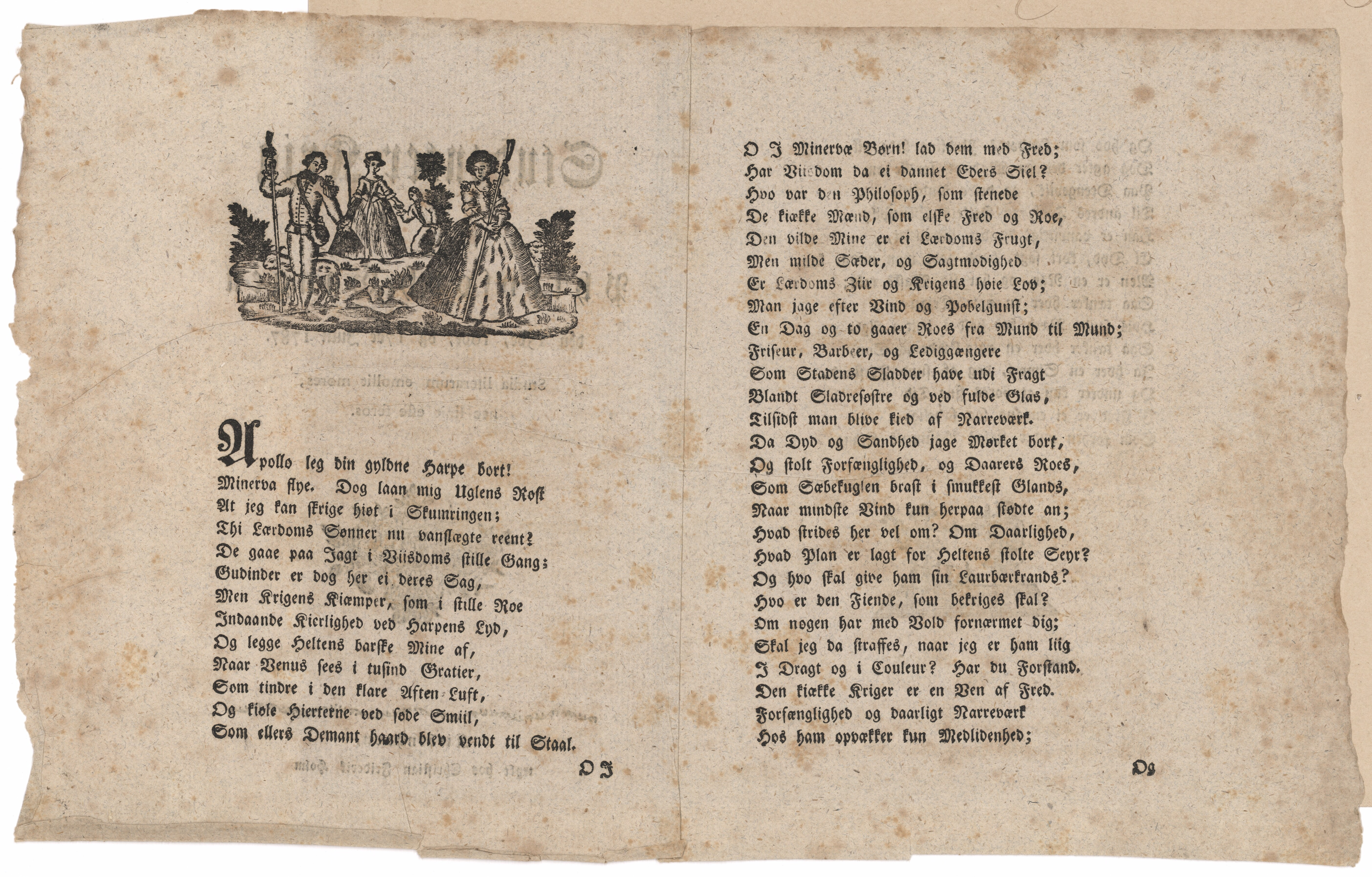
15–17 July: Student Riots in Filosofgangen.

July

- 15–17 July – Students and soldiers fight in Filosofgangen in Copenhagen ("Studenterkrigen i Filosofgangen").

September

- 4 September – J. Cl. Todes Døtreskole is founded as one of the first girls' schools in the city.

October

- 26 October – The Royal Danish Academy of Surgery on Bredgade in Copenhagen is inaugurated.

=== Undated ===
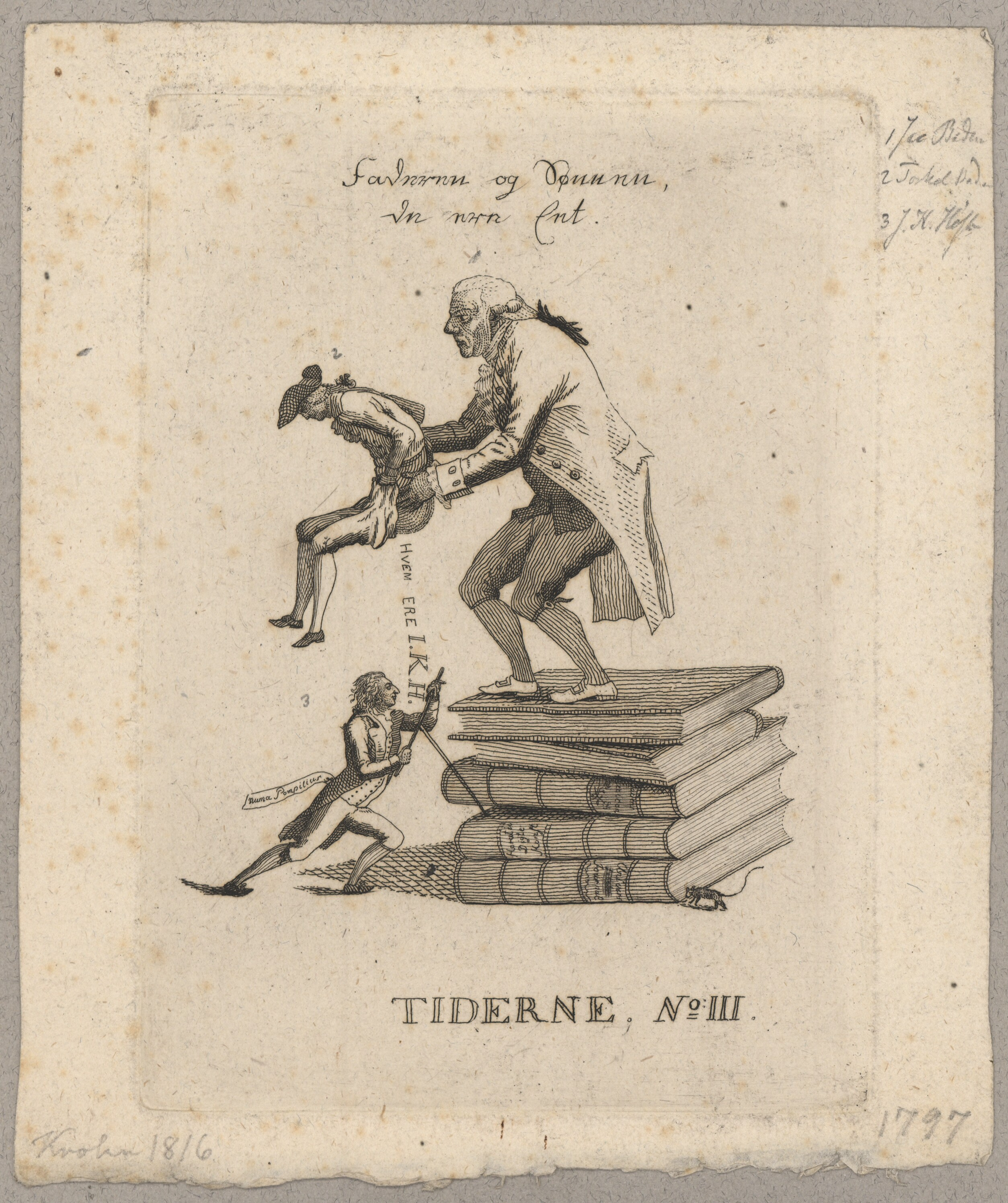
Illustration of the controversy between Høst and the Baden brothers from the magazine Tiderne.

- J. Cl. Todes Døtreskole, the first serious school for girls, is founded.
- English: A controversy between the historian Jens Kragh Høst (1772-1844) and Jacob Baden (1735-1840) and art historian Torkel Baden (1765-1849) attracts attention..
- Fort Augustaborg is constructed on the Danish Gold Coast.

== Births ==
- 12 January – Peter Nicolay Skibsted, naval officer (died 1832)
- 23 January – Christopher Fabritius, silversmith born 1710)
- 29 June – Broder Knud Brodersen Wigelsen, naval officer (died 1867)
- 4 September – Jørgen Hansen Koch, architect (died 1860)
- 6 September – Christian Waagepetersen, wine merchant and philanthropist (died 1840)
- 22 November – Rasmus Rask, scholar and philologist (died 1832)
- 20 December – Ludvig Christian Brinck-Seidelin, civil servant, landowner and politician (died 1865)

=== Date unknown ===
- Johannes Flintoe, painter of landscapes and scenes from Scandinavian history (died 1870)

== Deaths ==
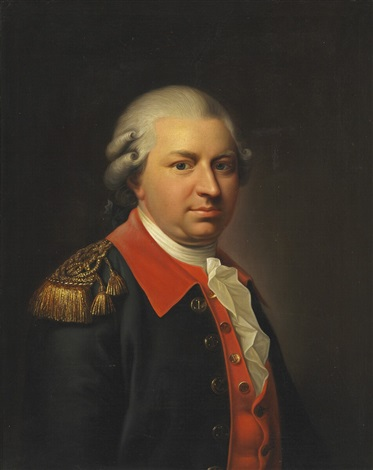
Henrik Gerner.

- 19 January – Antoine-Nicolas le Sage de Fontenay, naval officer (born 1725)
- 27 December – Henrik Gerner, naval officer and shipbuilder (born 1742)

Date unknown

- Anna Sofie Bülow, courtier (born 1745)
