= Claus Reventlow =

Danish landowner, Supreme Court justice and diocesan governor of the Diocese of Zealand

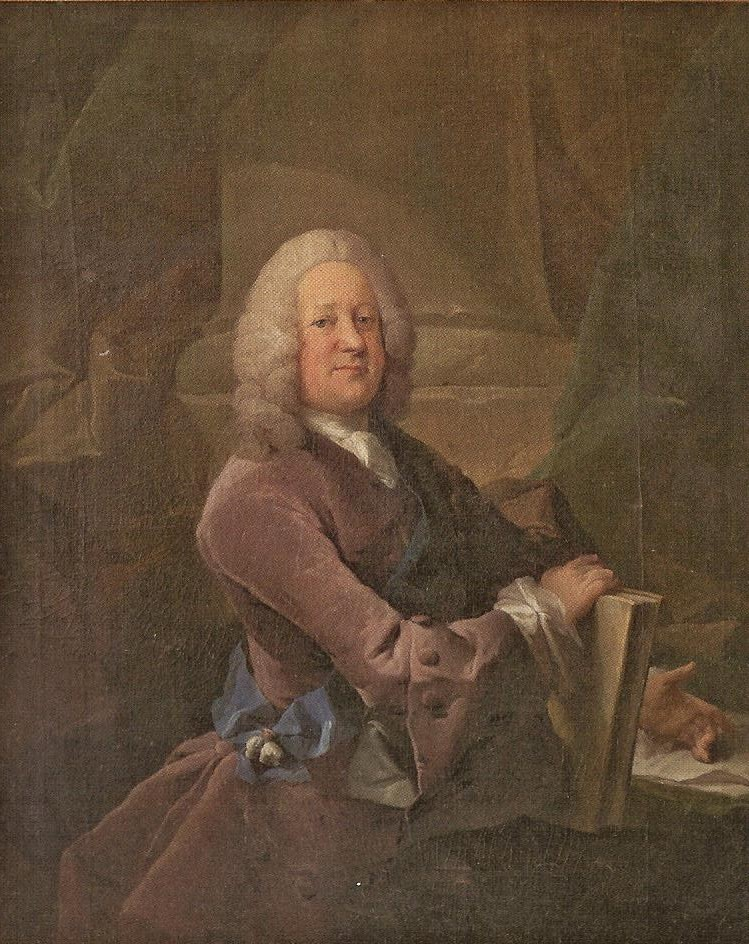
- Reventlow painted by Carl Gustaf Pilo.

President of the Supreme Court
- In office 1748–1758
- Monarch: Frederick V
- Preceded by: Johan Ludvig Holstein
- Succeeded by: H. F. von Levetzau (new office)
Diocesan offices
Diocesan Governor of Aalborg
In office 1730–1746
Monarch	Frederick V
Preceded by	Christian Reitzer
Succeeded by	Jørgen Bille

Personal details
- Born: 3 December 1693 Copenhagen, Denmark
- Died: 17 December 1748 (aged 55) Copenhagen, Denmark
- Occupation: Supreme Court justice, diocesan governor

Claus Reventlow (3 December 1693 – 10 May 1758) was a German-Danish government official, judge and landowner. He served as president of the Supreme Court of Denmark-Norway from 1730–1746. He owned a number of estates, first in the Salling area of northwestern Jutland and later in Schleswig. He was domherr of Lübeck.

== Early life and education ==
Reventlow was born on 3 December 1693 in Copenhagen, the son of Friedrich von Reventlow (1649–1728) of Neudorf and his second wife Anna Hedwig, née von Qualen (died 1717). At the age of seven, on 5 March 1701, he received a canon's prebend at Lübeck Cathedral. He studied at various German universities from 1711.

== Career ==
Reventlow began his career as a junior court official (kammerjunker). In 1727, he was promoted to chamberlain. In 1728, he was sent to Jutland as county governor of Skanderborg and Aakjær. In 1730, he became diocesan governor of Aalborg and county governor of Aalborghus, Aastrup, Børglum and Sejlstrup counties.

In 1736, Reventlow returned to Copenhagen after being appointed as Supreme Court and Hofretten judge. In the same year, he was awarded the title of Gehejmeraad. In 1747, he was promoted to Gehejmekonferensraad. In 1748, he was appointed as president of the Supreme Court.

In 1729, he was created a White Knight. In 1748, he was created a Blue Knight. In 1751, he was awarded the Ordre de l'Union Parfaite.

He was Verbitter (monastery provost) of Itzehoe Monastery and since 1736 also provost of St. John's Priory in Schleswig. When the election of a coadjutor as a possible successor to Prince-Bishop Frederick Augustus of Lübeck was to take place, Reventlow, in his capacity of domherr of Lübeck and abbot of the monastery in Itzeho, on behalf of the Danish king, successfully presented the candidacy of Hereditary Prince Frederick against the pretensions of the Gottorp House and opposition of the Imperial Court.

== Personal life ==
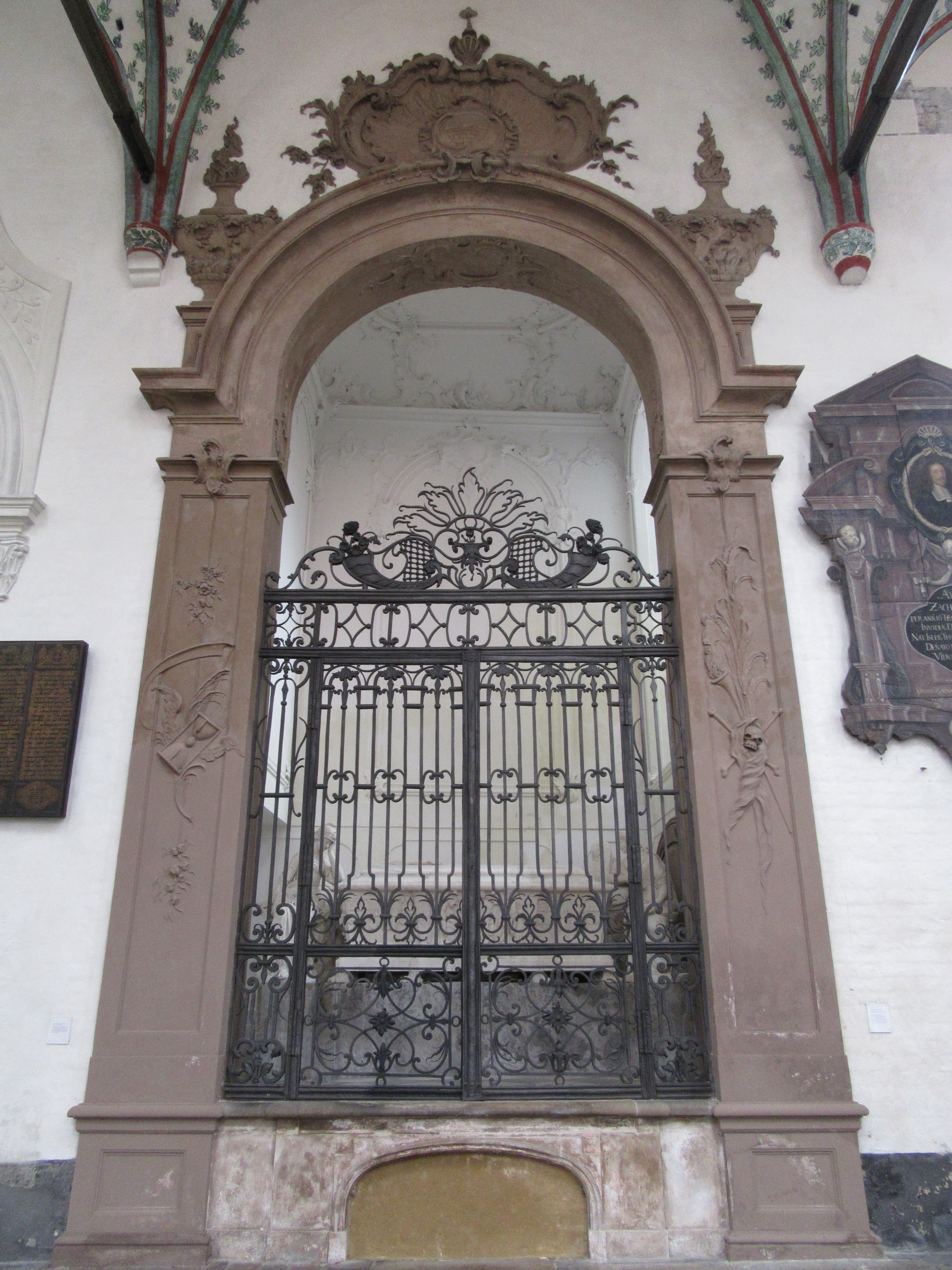
Reventlow's burial chapel in Lübeck.

On 7 November 1727, Reventlow married to Christiane Barbara Rantzau (1683–1747). She was a daughter of General-lieutenant Johan Rantzau and Sophie Amalie Friis and widow of Colonel Verner Parsberg til Eskjær (died 1719). On 6 November 1748, he married secondly to Charlotte Dorothea von Plessen (1724–1771). She was a daughter of Gehejmeraad Christian Ludvig von Plessen.

Neither of Reventlow's two wives bore him any children but he adopted his first wife's son by her first husband, Johan Parsberg (1701–1730), who was the last male-line descendant of the Parsberg family. Reventlow inherited the estates Eskjær (sold 1750), Astrup (sold in 1749) and Skivehus from him in 1735. In Schleswig, he owned Osterrade. In 1753, he bought Kluvensiek.

On 19 January 1736, Claus Reventlow acquired a side chapel of St. Catherine's Church in Lübeck from Hans Rantzau (c. 1685–1744), the bailiff of Segeberg. His father, Friedrich von Reventlow, had previously owned the chapel from 1708. The reason for acquiring it in St. Catherine's Church and not in the cathedral or a church in Copenhagen remains unclear. His first wife, Christiane Barbara, was initially buried there in 1747. Claus Reventlow died on 10 May 1758 in Copenhagen. His body was transported by ship to Lübeck, arriving on 18 July. During a two-hour tolling of the cathedral bells, it was taken to St. Catherine's Church. The remodeling of the chapel in the Rococo style, with stucco work and a new wrought-iron grille, continued until 1759. A monumental marble sarcophagus, crafted by the Copenhagen sculptor Simon Carl Stanley, was placed in the chapel. On its upper surface are a crucifix and a scroll bearing the names and titles of the deceased. The sides are decorated with 32 ancestral coats of arms and cartouches containing names. Four life-size marble statues flank the sarcophagus at the corners. These are female figures representing the three theological virtues of faith, hope, and charity, as well as the virtue of justice (Justitia).[8] Later, in front of the marble sarcophagus, facing the nave, the copper sarcophagus of his second wife, Charlotte Dorothea, who died suddenly in Osterrade in 1771, was placed. This sarcophagus was removed at an unknown time in the 20th century.

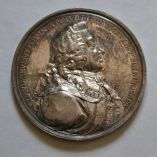
Medal to Claus Reventlow.

A commemorative medal designed by was struck in 1758. The obverse features a portrait relief of Claus Reventlow and the inscripti Magnus Gustav Arbien on "CLAVD REVENTLOV IN SVPR DIG DAN ET NORV TRIB PRÆSES". The reverse features a temple with justitia and the inscription "FULCIMEN ET DECUS USQVE DA D X MAY MDCCLVIII".
