= Anna Como =

Anna Como née Geringhelli (d. after 1775), was an Italian ballerina. She was the first professionally trained ballerina to be employed at the Royal Danish Theatre after its foundation, in 1755–63.

She was married to the ballet dancer Antonio Como. She arrived in Denmark as a member of the company of Pietro Mingotti. When the first ballet company was formed at the newly founded Royal Danish Theatre, she and her spouse were engaged as the first professionally trained performers there. At a period when there were no Danish ballet dancers in Denmark, they were the first principal dancers in the first Danish ballet of the national stage: they were also expected to take Danish pupils, and spouse was appointed ballet master. Anna Como was described as a temperamental, beautiful redhead. As an artist, she was a respected dancer, admired for her great flexibility and agile body. As a person, however, she was talked about as the lover of the theatre director Christian Fædder, which caused accusations of nepotism, and her and her spouse's rivalry with the first Danish ballet dancer couple, Carl Vilhelm Barch and Marie Barch, attracted attention.

The Como's left Denmark in 1763. Anna Como is noted to have performed at the Drury Lane Theatre in London in 1775.
