= 1686 in Denmark =

- Decades: 1660s; 1670s; 1680s; 1690s; 1700s
- See also: Other events of 1686; List of years in Denmark

Events from the year 1686 in Denmark.

== Incumbents ==
- Monarch – Christian V
- Grand Chancellor – Frederik Ahlefeldt, until his death on 7 July.

== Events ==
=== Undated ===
- Store Bededag is introduced by the Church of Denmark, combining several Catholic holy days into a single holiday.
- Gabriel Milan is removed as Governor of the Danish West Indies and placed under arrest for treason.

== Births ==
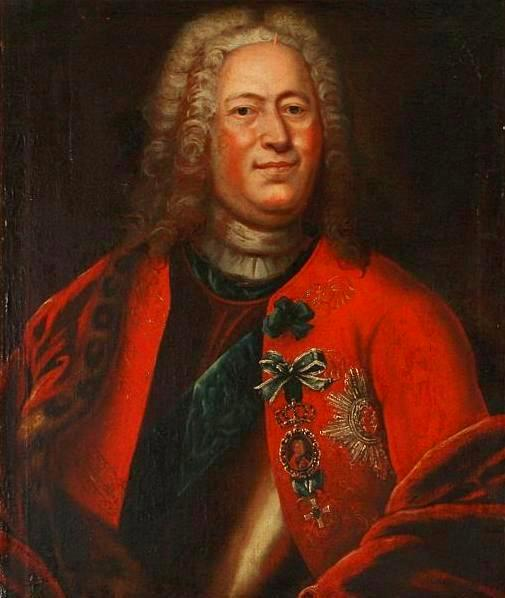
Poul Vendelbo Løvenørn.

- 5 April – Poul Vendelbo Løvenørn, Secretary of War and Minister of the Navy (died 1740)
- 12 August – Bendix Grodtschilling the Youngest, painter and conchologist (died 1737)

== Deaths ==
- 29 May – Ove Juul, nobleman and vice Governor-general of Norway (born 1615)
- 7 July – Frederik Ahlefeldt, statesman and Grand Chancellor (born 1623)
- 25 November – Nicolas Steno, 17th-century scientist and bishop (born 1638)
