= 1689 in Denmark =

- Decades: 1660s; 1670s; 1680s; 1690s; 1700s
- See also: Other events of 1689; List of years in Denmark

Events from the year 1689 in Denmark.

== Incumbents ==
- Monarch – Christian V

== Events ==
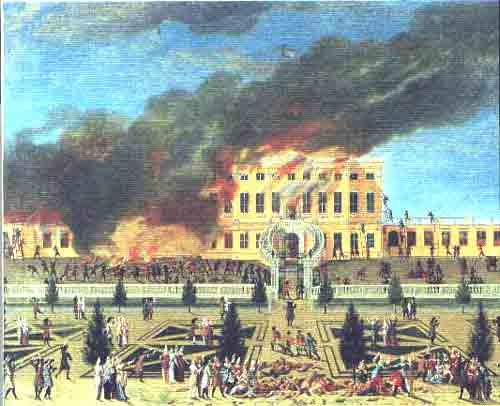
Fire of Sophie Amalienborg on 19 April, painted by Johan Jacob Bruun

=== April ===
- 19 April – Sophie Amalienborg burns down when a stage decoration catches fire during an opera performance in connection with the king's birthday a few days earlier. 170 people are killed, including many prominent citizens.

=== October ===
- October – A Danish Auxiliary Corpsof 996 horse and 6,109 foot, under the command of Ferdinand Willem, Duke of Württemberg-Neuenstadt, is sent to England to take part in the Williamite War in Ireland

=== November ===
- 10 November – Reformed Church in Copenhagen is consecrated.

== Births ==
- January – Peder Benzon Mylius, judge and writer (died 1745)
- 4 September – Anna Sophie Schack, noblewoman and landlord (born 1760)

== Deaths ==
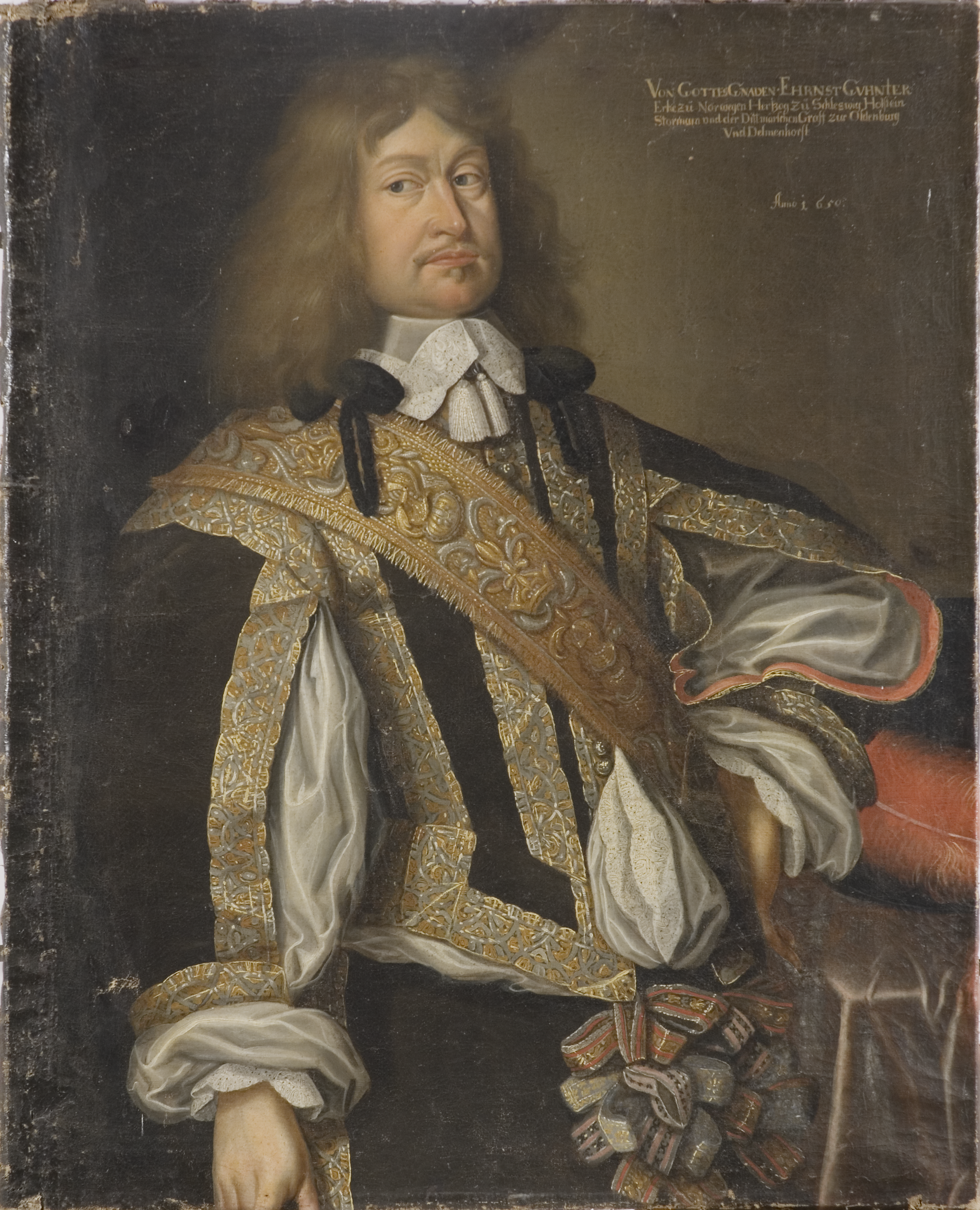
Ernest Gunther I, Duke of Schleswig-Holstein-Sonderburg-Augustenburg.

- 18 January – Ernest Gunther I, Duke of Schleswig-Holstein-Sonderburg-Augustenburg (1609)
- 26 March – Gabriel Milan, governor (born c. 1631)
- October – Christopher Heins, Governor-General of The Danish West Indies
