= 1802 in Denmark =

- Decades: 1780s; 1790s; 1800s; 1810s; 1820s
- See also: Other events of 1802; List of years in Denmark

Events from the year 1802 in Denmark.

== Incumbents ==
- Monarch – Christian VII
- Prime minister – Christian Günther von Bernstorff

== Events ==
- April – The British occupation of the Danish West Indies ends.
- 4 May – The Golden Horns of Gallehus are stolen.

=== Undated ===
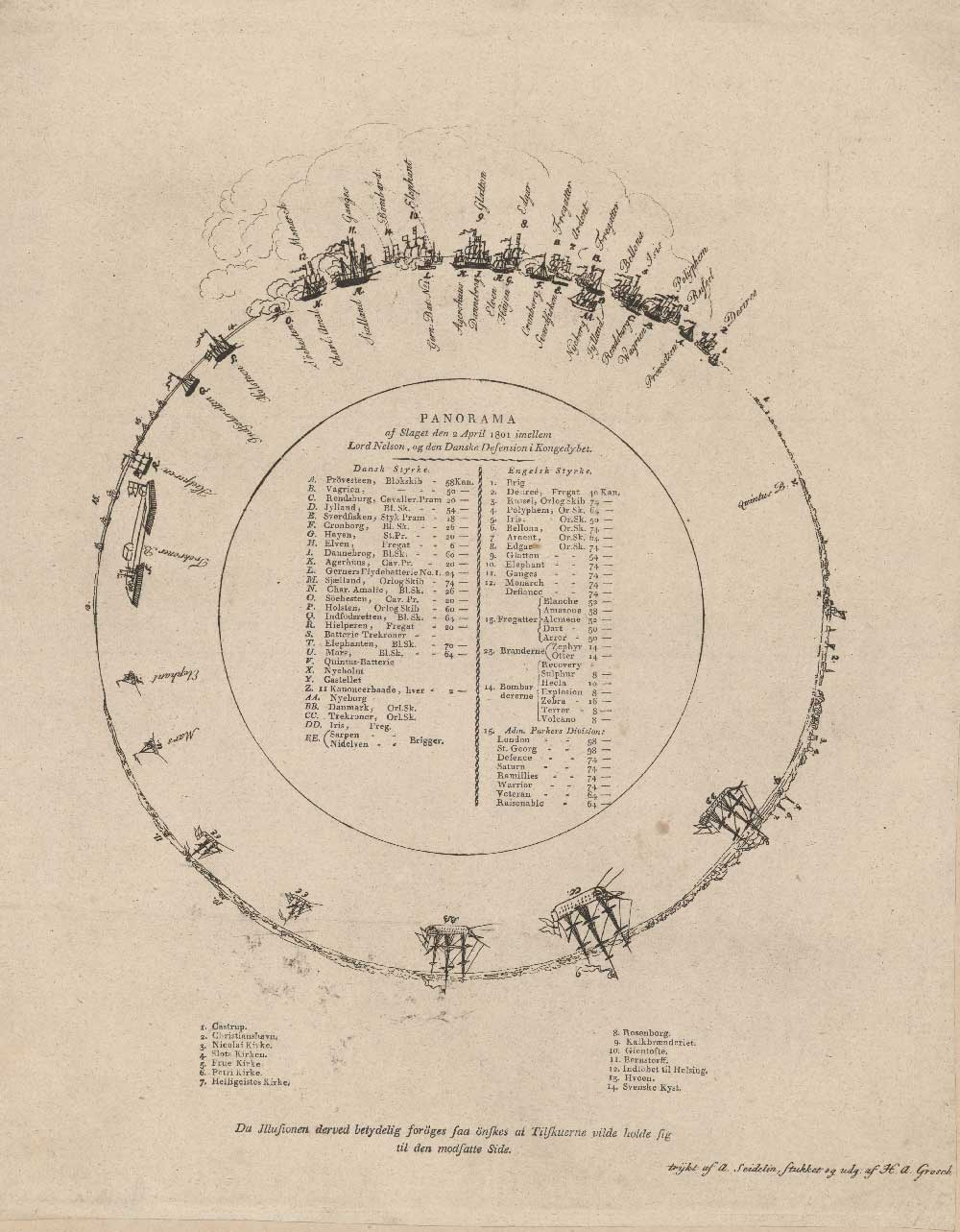
Heinrich Grosch's panoramic painting of the 1801 Battle of Copenhagen.

- A Panoramic painting of the Battle of Copenhagen created by Heinrich August Grosch (1763-1843) is on public display in a purpose-built wooden rotunda ay present-day Sølvgade 20–22 in Copenhagen. In 1800,

== Births ==
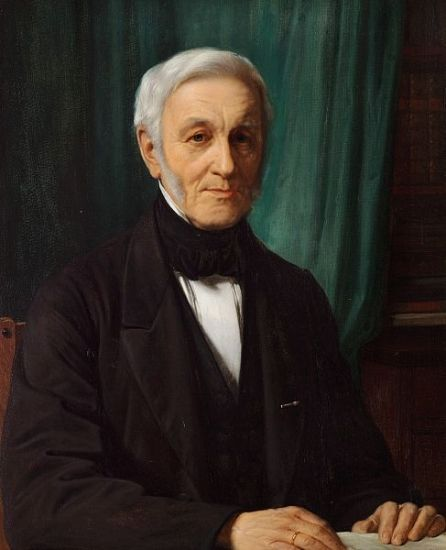
Johann Gottfried Burman Becker.

=== January–March ===
- 1 January – Joachim Wedell-Neergaard, diplomat (died 1862)

=== April–June ===
- 21 April – Wilhelm Wanscher, businessman and art collector (died 1882)
- 26 April – Johann Gottfried Burman Becker, pharmacist, writer and illustrator (died 1860)
- 26 May – Gustav Adolph Lammers, priest, architect and artist (died 1878)

=== July–September ===
- 27 July – Hans Jonatan, opera singer and composer (died 1858)
- 19 September – Frederik Theodor Kloss, painter (died 1876)

=== Pctpber–December ===
- 8 October – Rudolph Rothe, landscape architect (died 1877)
- 25 October – Balthazar Christensen, jurist and politician (died 1882)

== Deaths ==
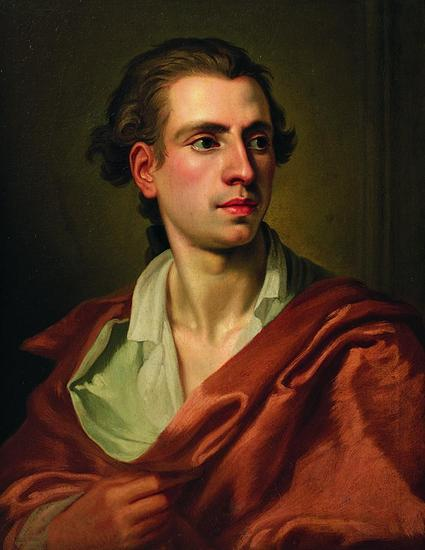
Johannes Wiedewelt.

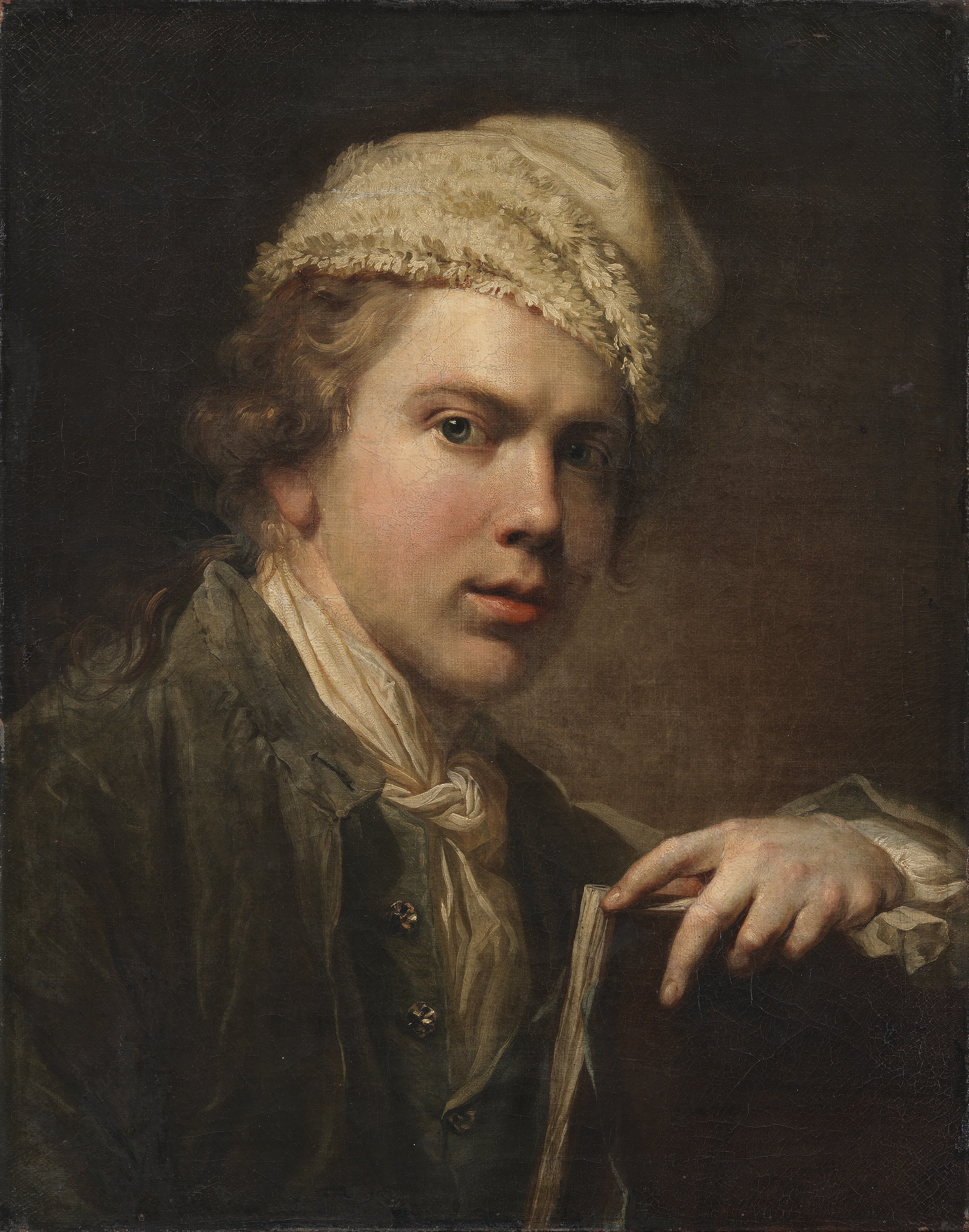
Jens Juel.

=== January–March ===
- 13 February – Jakob Edvard Colbjørnsen, chief justice (born 1744)
- 8 February – Søren Gyldendal, bookstore owner, publisher (born 1742)

=== April–June ===
- 15 May – Frederik Christian Rosenkrantz, statesman and landowner (born 1724)

=== July–September ===
- 12 July – Johan Henrik Knuth, county governor and landowner (born 1746)
- 24 August – Niels Ditlev Riegels, historian, journalist and pamphleteer (born 1755)

=== October–December ===
- 4 October – Niels Brock, merchant (born 1731)
- 16 September – Christian Joseph Zuber, architect (born 1736)
- 17 December – Johannes Wiedewelt, sculptor (born 1731)
- 27 December – Jens Juel, painter (born 1745)
