= Den danske Spectator =

Danish language weekly literary review in Copenhagen (1744–1745)

Den danske Spectator (Danish: The Danish Spectator) was one of the earliest magazines published in Danish language. It existed between 1744 and 1745 and was established by Jørgen Riis. The headquarters of the weekly magazine was in Copenhagen. It was a literary review, but it frequently contained writings on censorship, freedom of speech and motivations to write.
