= Rugård witch trials =

The Rugård witch trials took place at Rugård manor, and the community of Ebeltoft close to it, on Jylland in Denmark in 1685–1686. It was the most significant witch trial in Denmark since the Rosborg witch trials of 1639, and caused a wave of new witch trials on Jylland after a period of diminishing witch hunts. The case led to the issue of a new law banning local courts from handing down and enacting death sentences without confirmation of the national high court, a law which interrupted the local witch hunt and eventually stopped it nationwide.

== The Trials ==
In 1683, the first witch trial in Denmark since 1652 caused a witch hysteria in the nation. In September 1685, a woman by the name of Mette was put on trial in Ebeltoft, accused by her neighbors for having killed their horses by the use of magic. The previous year Mette had sworn to take revenge on the neighbors when they refused to help her, and eventually the horses had died without identifiable cause. Mette was placed in the prison dungeon at Rugård manor, the residence of the nobleman Jørgen Arenfeldt, who had the authority to issue private sentences. At Christmas 1686, Arenfeldt and three visiting priests conducted a private interrogation on Mette, and she was judged to be guilty and executed upon the consent of Judge Lerche.

In Ebeltoft, bailiff Hans Jacobsen had four suspects arrested, tried on water and two of them burnt at the stake. In parallel, Jørgen Arenfeldt continued his witch trial on Rugård manor, where he had Gye Nielsdatter confess to witches companies, devil's mark, and devil's pact. Nielsdatter was made to point out accomplices and then sentenced to be burnt, which was carried out in March 1686. Arenfeldt also had Anne Sørensdatter, who was rumored to have clairvoyance, arrested together with her mother, despite the fact that they lived outside of his legal jurisdiction. He forced Anne Sørensdatter to name a number of accomplices, among them some powerful people, and then had her and her mother sentenced to death.

The witch trials on Rugård manor and Ebeltoft were marked by private interrogations, illegal use of torture, the use of ordeal of water and the needle test. The accused were exposed to religious arguments by priests, who convinced the accused of their guilt. They caused a chain of witch trials on Eastern Jylland in the year of 1686.

During his interrogation of Anne Sørensdatter, Jørgen Arenfeldt had been given the names of several powerful people, who were then in turn accused of being witches. Because of this Arenfeldt himself was summoned to Åhus 14 July 1686 for questioning. On 21 July 1686, a new law was issued which banned all local courts from executing death sentences without confirmation from the national high court, a regulation that effectively terminated all witch trials by early 1687. In September 1686, Arenfeldt was sentenced guilty of having acquiring the names that denounced powerful people as witches from Anne Sørensdatter by the illegal use of torture, and in November he was fined and deprived of his right to conduct private trials.

The witch trials in the rest of Denmark were to continue in the following years, with the last of the witch trials in Denmark that lead to a death sentence being that of Anne Palles in 1693.
