= Petrine Fredstrup =

Danish ballet dancer

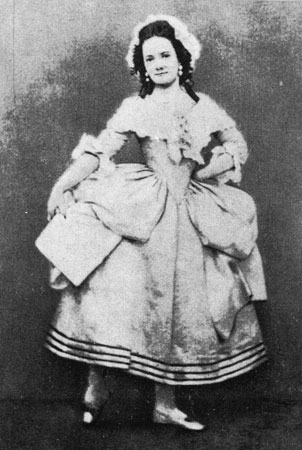
Petrine Fredstrup as Ulla in Bellman or Polish dance by August Bournonville

Petrine Caroline Georgine Fredstrup (2 June 1827- 24 September 1881), was a Danish ballet dancer. She was regarded as one of the elite members of the Royal Danish Ballet from 1845 to 1871. She was also a respected ballet instructor.
