= Nathanael Diesel =

Danish composer, violinist, and lutenist

Nathanael Diesel (1692 – October 26, 1745) was a Danish composer, violinist and lutenist. He was a teacher to Princess Charlotte Amalie of Denmark.

== See also ==
- List of Danish composers
