= Johann Andreas Mühlensteth =

Danish pharmacist

Johannes (Johan) Andreas Mühlensteth (7 April 1746 - 11 January 1819) was a Danish pharmacist.

== Early life and education ==
Mühlensteth was born in Vejle as the son of the local pharmacist Hans Christian Mühlensteth (1708-61) and his wife Marie Hansen Warmark (1720-83). He graduated from Fredericia Grammar School in 1761 and was then an apprentice at the royal court pharmacy in Copenhagen for two years before returning to his hometown where he managed the pharmacy on behalf of his mother.

== Career ==
Mühlensteth then worked at the pharmacy Svane Apotek in Viborg for five years until his graduation. In 1775 he unsuccessfully applied for the license to run the pharmacy in Viborg. He purchased Svane Apotek in Copenhagen in 1781 and was in the same time granted permission to move it from its old building in Højbrostræde to Østergade. The new pharmacy opened in 1782. He lectured on chemistry at the University of Copenhagen in 1783 and acted as assessor pharmaciae in the Collegium medicum until 1803.

== Personal life ==
Mühlensteth married Maria Christina Bruun (1 August 1754 – 5 April 1829) on 15 May 1782 in Church of Our Lady.

In 1795 he purchased the country houses Store Tuborg and Lille Tuborg on Strandvejen north of Copenhagen. He then lived at Store Tyborg until 1801.

Mühlensteth was the first person in Denmark to carry out experiments with hot air balloons similar to those carried out by J. M. and J. E. Montgolfier in France. In 1783 he received media attention for sending up the first Danish hot air balloon.
