= Henrich Suhm =

Henrich von Suhm (5 October 1693 – 14 January 1744) was a Royal Dano-Norwegian Navy officer and colonial administrator. He served as governor of the Danish Gold Coast from 1724 to 1727 and then as Governor of St. Thomas and St. John in the Danish West Indies from 1727 to 1733.

== Early life and background ==
Suhm was the son of gehejmeraad Burchard von Suhm and Gesilla von Bruggemann. He was the nephew of Admiral Ulrich Frederik Suhm.

== Career ==
Suhm became a cadet in 1700, a junior lieutenant in 1714, a senior lieutenant in 1719 and captain lieutenant in 1723. On 3 December 1723, he was appointed Governor of the Danish Gold Coast. On 27 April 1724, he arrived to the Danish Gold Coast on board the frigate Haabets Galej. Christiansborg Fortress was refurbished during his years as governor. The Ada Lodge (Ada-Logen) at Rio Volta was also established.

On 6 March 1727, he was appointed as governor (vice commandant) of St. Thomas and St. John in the Danish West Indies. On 6 March 1727, he departed from the Danish Gold Coast on board Haabets Galej, The ship carried a cargo of enslaved Africans, of whom 217 were alive at the arrival at Saint Thomas (14 May 1727).

Suhm bought plantation No. 74 in the Coral Bay Quarter on St. John. The land was first planted in 1728. It was free of taxes until 1735.

On 21 February 1733, he was succeeded by Phillip Gardelin as governor of the islands.

== Personal life ==
On 21 February 1733, he was married to Anna Cathrine Frørup. After the death of his first wife, he married on 31 July 1739. to Sophie Elisabeth Holm (née Benzon, 1705–1769). She was the daughter of renteskriver Peter Benzon and his wife Elisabeth. Her first husband was court painter Fr. Chr. Holm. She was, after Suhm's death, a third time married to admiral Michael Tønder (1747).

Suhm died on 14 January 1744 in Copenhagen. His funeral took place on 22 January in St. Nicolas' Church.
