= Peder Hansen Resen =

Danish historian

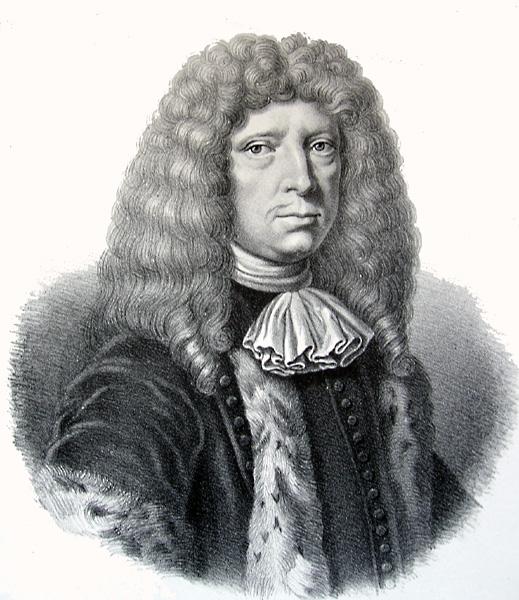
- Depiction of Hansen Resen from 1868.
- Born: 17 June 1625; Copenhagen, Denmark
- Died: 1 June 1688 (aged 62); Copenhagen, Denmark
- Occupation: Historian
- Honours: Order of the Dannebrog

Peder Hansen Resen (17 June 1625 – 1 June 1688) was a Danish historian, legal scholar and president of Copenhagen. He lived in what was then Denmark–Norway.

== Early life and education ==
Peder Hansen Resen was born 17 June 1625 in Copenhagen. He was the son of the Bishop of Zealand, Hans Hansen Resen and Thale Vinstrup. As a young child he was privately tutored until 1641, when he began attending Vor Frue Skole. In 1643 he matriculated at the University of Copenhagen where he passed the theological exam in 1645. After graduating, he worked returned to Vor Frue Skole as a teacher.

In May 1647, accompanied by Rasmus Bartholin, he set off on a trip abroad. Resen began his journey in the Netherlands where he then studied philology and jurisprudence for four years at the Leiden University. While in Leiden in 1651, he met up with his three brothers; one, Elias, was drowned on an excursion to Amsterdam. After his time in Leiden, Resen spent several months in Paris before traveling on to Orléans. He then undertook a journey with Corfitz Trolle and his steward Conrad Hesse through France and Spain. After returning to Genoa in 1652, Resen parted ways with his traveling companions, and left for Padua. Resen spent a year at the University of Padua, where he received his first academic position as legal expert and advisor. In September 1653 he received a law doctorate from the University of Padua. He gained a reputation in the region and had an audience with the Doge and the council of Venice. During his time in Italy, he also spent time in Rome and Naples.

After an absence of six years, Resen began his journey back to Denmark. On the way back, he learned in Rome of his father's death, and in Florence that his mother had also died. He then journeyed on to Trento, Augsburg, Regensburg, through Saxony, Brunswick and Lüneburg to Hamburg and finally to Lübeck and Copenhagen, where he arrived in November 1653. Resen remained based in Copenhagen for the rest of his life.

== Career ==
As a young scholar of great hope and a member of a family who had a prestigious name in the academic world, Resen was an obvious candidate for a professorship at the University of Copenhagen. In 1657, a vacancy in the university faculty emerged, and he filled the role as a professor of ethics. In 1662, he became a legal professor. He is perhaps the first professor to have lectured on Danish law in particular. He also lectured on ecclesiastical and secular legislation, both in Denmark and internationally.

His historical interests centered in old national laws, and he published several translations of historical works relating to Scandinavian legal history. In 1675, he published a translation of the Hirdskraa into Danish and Latin. In 1684, he published a work on Christian II's laws. Resen was also the first to make the Edda, Völuspá, and Hávamál available in printed form; he published these works with Danish and Latin translations. In 1680, he published a revised edition of Claus Christophersen Lyschander's chronicle of King Frederik II. His work Inscriptiones Hafnienses, published in 1668, continues to be of historical value. The work contains passages about Tycho Brahe and his presence on Hven. Resen also wrote a treatise on Greenland, Groenlandia, published a year before his death, in which he advocated for its colonization. Resen's most famous work, however, was the Atlas Danicus.

It was common to hold multiple offices at once during this era and Resen soon acquired several occupational and honorary roles. In 1664, he was designated as the mayor of Copenhagen by the king; in 1669 he became an assessor of the Supreme Court; and in 1672 he took up the office of president in his city of residence. In addition, he worked with the State College from 1672 until it closed in 1676. In 1677 he became a sitting member of the Supreme Court. He was granted the right to bear a coat of arms in 1680, and in 1686 he was awarded the honorary title of etatsråd (lit. 'Minister of State'). As a legal scholar, he participated in the Third Revision Committee and the Audit Commission of the Danish Code from 1680 to 1681. In 1683, he relinquished his academic positions, some of which he transferred to Jens Bircherod.

== Personal life ==
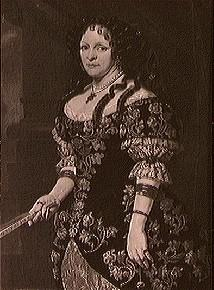
Anna Meier (1625-1689) painted by unknown artist in c. 1670 (Frederiksborg Museum)

On 8 July 1655, Resen married Anna Meier in Copenhagen. She had been born on 26 February 1625 in Itzehoe, where her father, Heine Meier, was a respected businessman. The couple had no children. Resen died in Copenhagen on 1 June 1688 after being afflicted by gout for several years. His wife died a year later in December 1689.

Since he was a young child, Resen was a lover and connoisseur of books. On a trip abroad he visited the library at El Escorial in Madrid and is said to have in vain offered 100 Rigsdaler for permission to print the library's catalog. From around 1659, Resen consistently collected books, often collecting them at auctions. He managed to acquire his brother's, Dr. Paul Resen's, collection when it was auctioned off in 1661. Beyond auctions, he expanded his collection by writing to bishops and other scholars throughout Scandinavia. He managed to create an extraordinarily rich collection of Danish and Norse literature in addition to a substantial collection of foreign legal literature. As these subjects were slightly underrepresented within the university's collection, he presented them to the University of Copenhagen. He also donated his grandfather's collection of manuscripts. He curated a large collection of handwritten legal manuscripts and other documents pertaining to Copenhagen's history, some of which still exist. His personal collection, however, was destroyed in the Copenhagen Fire of 1728.

Resen died on 1 June 1688. He was buried at the Church of Our Lady in Copenhagen.

== Atlas Danicus ==
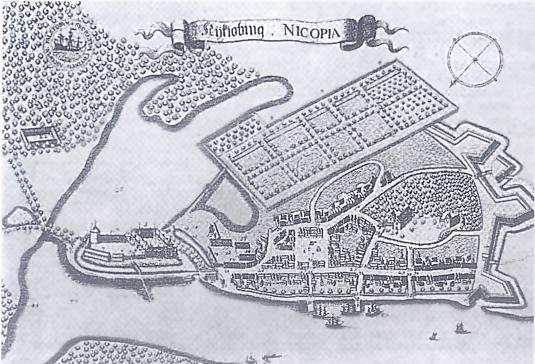
Map of Nykøbing Falster created for the Atlas Danicus.

Resen's most well known historical work was the Atlas Danicus. With Atlas Danicus, Resen set out to give a description of Denmark, detailing geography, history, flora, and fauna within the nation. He began the project in 1666. In the process of researching for the work, Resen compiled a vast collection of information, which alone comprised 30 folios. This included several copper and wood engravings that he commissioned of maps, bird's eye views of regions, and assorted images. The publication of such a substantially sized work proved difficult, and the work was never published in its entirety. As test publications, he published his work on Samsø in 1675, and Copenhagen in 1677, but no further sections of the atlas were published in full. Towards the end of Resen's life, a few abbreviated extracts were published by other scholars, including the priest Johannes Brunsmand. In 1685, a committee was formed to review the atlas at last, and it seemed that the work would finally be published.

After Resen's death in 1688, his will entrusted his widow, Anna Meier, with seeing to the publication of his work. She successfully made steps toward publishing the work, entrusting historian Christian Aarsleb with the printing. Anna died a year after her husband, and Aarsleb took up a position as a village priest in 1692 and abandoned his intent to publish the Atlas Danicus. Resen's folios and the plate engravings he had commissioned for the atlas became part of the Copenhagen University Library. The library suffered a fire in 1728, in which a total of 39 of Resen's folios were destroyed. These contained his revised work for the atlas as well as his preliminary notes. Several of the copper engravings created by cartographer Johan Huusman which were held by the library survive to this day, including maps of Jutland, Bornholm, Møn, and Samsø.

Only a manuscript of seven volumes of folios survived, as they had been prepared for publication and privately held by Vincents Lerche. After the fire, Lerche realized that his copy had become priceless, and kept the work in his private collection, as did his son, who inherited it after him. Towards the end of his life, Lerche's son bequeathed his works to the king. A transcript of the seven surviving volumes of Atlas Danicus were briefly loaned to the architect Lauritz de Thurah, who made a copy of the work for his reference while compiling his own history of Copenhagen. In 1794, a fire at Christiansborg Palace destroyed Lerche's copy which was then part of the crown's collection. The transcribed copy created by Thurah was donated to the Royal Library, and remains intact to this day.

== List of works ==
- Kiøbenhafns, Amagers og Uraniborgs merckelige Opskrifter. (1668)
- Kiøbenhaffns Affridtzing Tafle med en krit Forklaring baade paa Danske og Tydske. (1674)
- Samsøes Beskrivelse med Figurer in Folio. (1675)
- Petri Johannis Resenii Bibliotheca Regiæ Academiæ Hafniensi Donata Cui Præfixa Est Ejusdem Resenii Vita. (1685)
