= Hans Gram (historian) =

Danish academic, philologist and historian

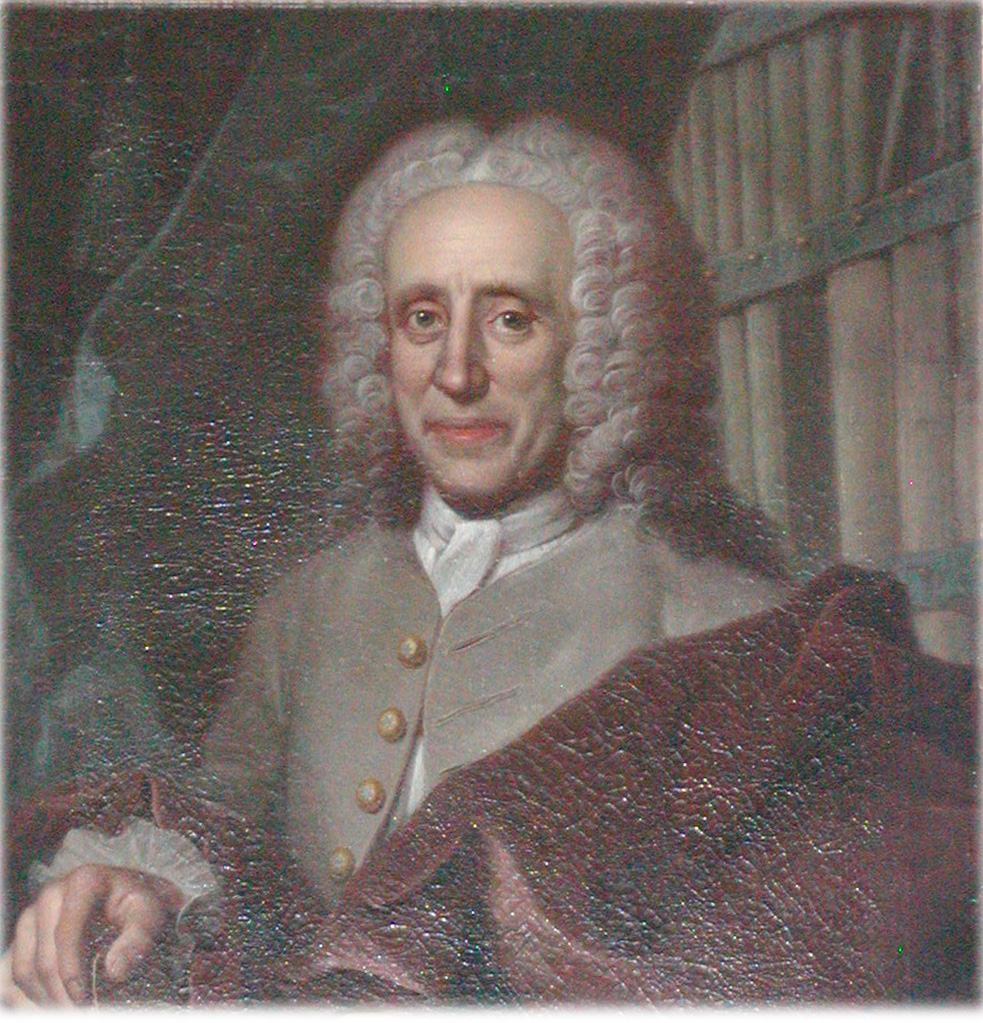
Hans Gram

Hans Gram (28 October 1685 – 19 February 1748) was a Danish academic, philologist and historian.

== Biography ==
Gram was born at Bjergby in Hjørring in Vendsyssel, Denmark. His father was a parish priest. In 1703, he graduated from the University of Copenhagen. In 1708 he acquired a Master's Degree. In 1714 he became a professor of Greek at the University of Copenhagen. In 1730 he was named royal historian and royal librarian as well as manager of the Royal Library and the secretary of the Royal Archives. From 1740, he returned to the University of Copenhagen where he served as rector from 1744-1745.

He is best known for his critical editions of old Danish history, being credited with the discovery of many new sources and the correction of countless errors pertaining to Danish history. He was a catalyst towards the 1742 founding of the Videnskaberne Selskab (Royal Danish Academy of Sciences and Letters).

He was the author of Nucleus latinitatis, qvo pleræqve Romani sermonis voces (1722), and also made contributions to Johannes Moller's Cimbria Literata (1744).

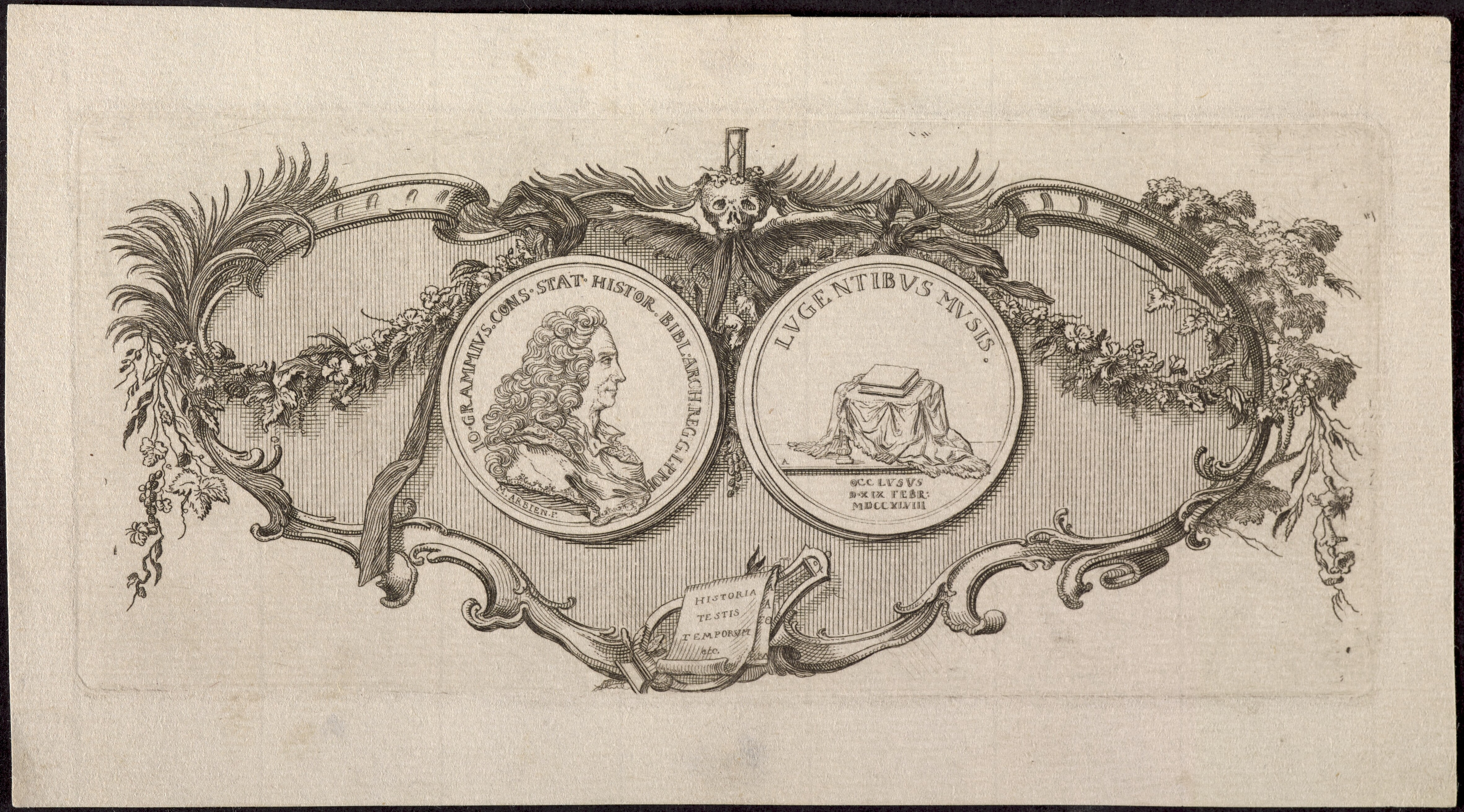
