= Johan Ludvig Holstein =

Danish politician

- An oil painting depicting Holstein, c. 1752

Privy Councillor of Denmark
- Predecessor: Ulrik Adolf Holstein
- Successor: Johann Hartwig Ernst von Bernstorff
- Born: 7 September 1694; Lübz, Mecklenburg, Germany
- Died: 29 January 1763 (aged 68); Copenhagen, Denmark
- Spouse: Hedevig Vind (m. 1733; died 1756)
- Issue: Christian Frederik Holstein
- Father: Johan Georg Holstein
- Mother: Ida von Bülow

Johan Ludvig Holstein, Lensgreve til Ledreborg (7 September 1694 – 29 January 1763) was a Danish Minister of state from 1735 to 1751.

He was the ancestor of the Holstein-Ledreborg family, including Ludvig Holstein-Ledreborg and Knud Johan Ludvig, Lensgreve Holstein til Ledreborg, husband of Princess Marie Gabriele of Luxembourg. In 1739 he built Ledreborg Manor near Lejre, Denmark.

The Danish colony Holsteinsborg on Greenland (now Sisimiut), was named after him.

== Early life ==
Johan Ludvig was the son of Johan Georg Holstein, who would himself become Danish prime minister, and Ida Frederikke Joachime of the Bülow family. He was born on 7 September 1694, at the Lübz castle which belonged to his maternal grandmother. His tutors during his upbringing included J. W. Schröder who later would go on to tutor Christian VI of Denmark. In 1711 his father sent him to Hamburg where he studied with Johann Albert Fabricius for a year. Subsequently, he studied and traveled at various places in Germany, the Netherlands, France and England until 1716, when he became a courtier and civil servant in Denmark.

== Career in Denmark ==
He obtained the position of marshal of the court to Crown Prince Christian (later King Christian VI) in 1721. In 1727, he became a member of the College of Missions where his father was president, and the same year he also became director of the Waisenhuset, an orphanage King Frederick IV founded that year.

When Christian VI became king in 1730, he appointed Holstein stiftsamtmand (amtmann and co-administrator of the diocese with the bishop) of Zealand and amtmann of Copenhagen and Roskilde. In February 1734, he was appointed Minister of Finance. As the new king soon became disappointed in the men he originally had chosen to lead the chanceries, he appointed Holstein leading secretary of the Danish chancery (a position often known as Minister of State) on 12 May 1735, replacing Iver Rosenkrantz. At the same time, he became member of the king's council (Konseillet). In 1740, he also replaced Rosenkrantz as patron of the University of Copenhagen. In 1757, he additionally became first member of a special agricultural committee which was operative for several years.

Holstein was in regular correspondence with the King about daily affairs and matters with which the King was occupied.

== Religious and scientific interests ==
Holstein was deeply religious with pietistic leanings. In his older days he studied Greek in order to be able to read the New Testament in its original language. He also studied philosophy and history. Francis Bacon was among the philosophers he read, and he corresponded with Johann Lorenz von Mosheim and Johann Matthias Gesner. In Denmark, he was in contact with historians Hans Gram and Andreas Hojer.

With the permission of the King, Holstein and Gram founded the Royal Danish Academy of Sciences and Letters on 13 November 1742. He served as president of the Academy for the rest of his lifetime and the meetings were held at his residence. The academy opted right from the beginning to publish in Danish rather than German, even though German was Holstein's mother tongue as well as the language of many academics in Denmark at that time.

== Personal life and Ledreborg ==
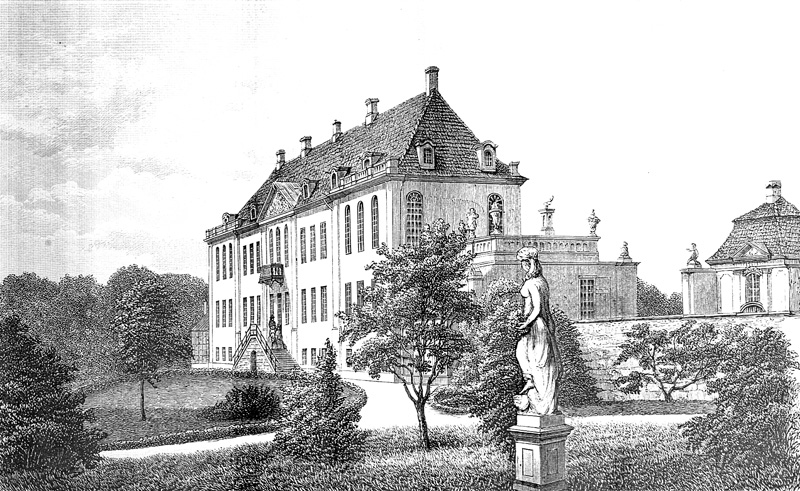
Ledreborg Palace

Holstein married Hedevig Vind (1707–1756), a Danish noblewoman, in 1733. They had three children, among them Christian Frederik Holstein. With the help of her inheritance, capital obtained from selling his properties in Mecklenburg, and his income as a civil servant Holstein was able to buy land in the Ledreborg area, where he built the Ledreborg mansion. Ledreborg was first established as a stamhus (family seat) and in 1750 converted into a comital trust (Danish: lensgrevskap).

At his death Holstein left a library of 20,000 books, as well as a collection of handwritten manuscripts. Both are now in the Royal Library in Copenhagen.

== Decorations ==
- Knight of the Dannebrog (1727)
- Knight of the Elephant (1747)

== Bibliography ==
- Holm, E. Dansk Biografisk Leksikon, VIII (in Danish). pp. 37–43. 1897–1905. Via Project Runeberg

Political offices
Preceded by Iver Rosenkrantz	Privy Councillor of Denmark; 1735 -1751	Succeeded by Johann Hartwig Ernst von Bernstorff
