= Indfødsretten =

Indfødsretten may refer to:

- Indfødsretten af 1776, Danish Citizenship Act of 1776

== Ships ==
- HDMS Indfødsretten (1776)
- HDMS Indfødsretten (1786)

== See also ==
- Danish nationality law
