= 1817 in Denmark =

- Decades: 1790s; 1800s; 1810s; 1820s; 1830s
- See also: Other events of 1817; List of years in Denmark

Events from the year 1817 in Denmark.

== Incumbents ==
- Monarch – Frederick VI
- Prime minister – Joachim Godske Moltke

== Culture ==
=== Art ===
- Christoffer Wilhelm Eckersberg completes The Death of Balder as his admission painted for admission into the Royal Danish Academy of Fine Arts.
- The 300th anniversary of the Reformation is commemorated with a medal designed by Salomon Ahron Jacobson.
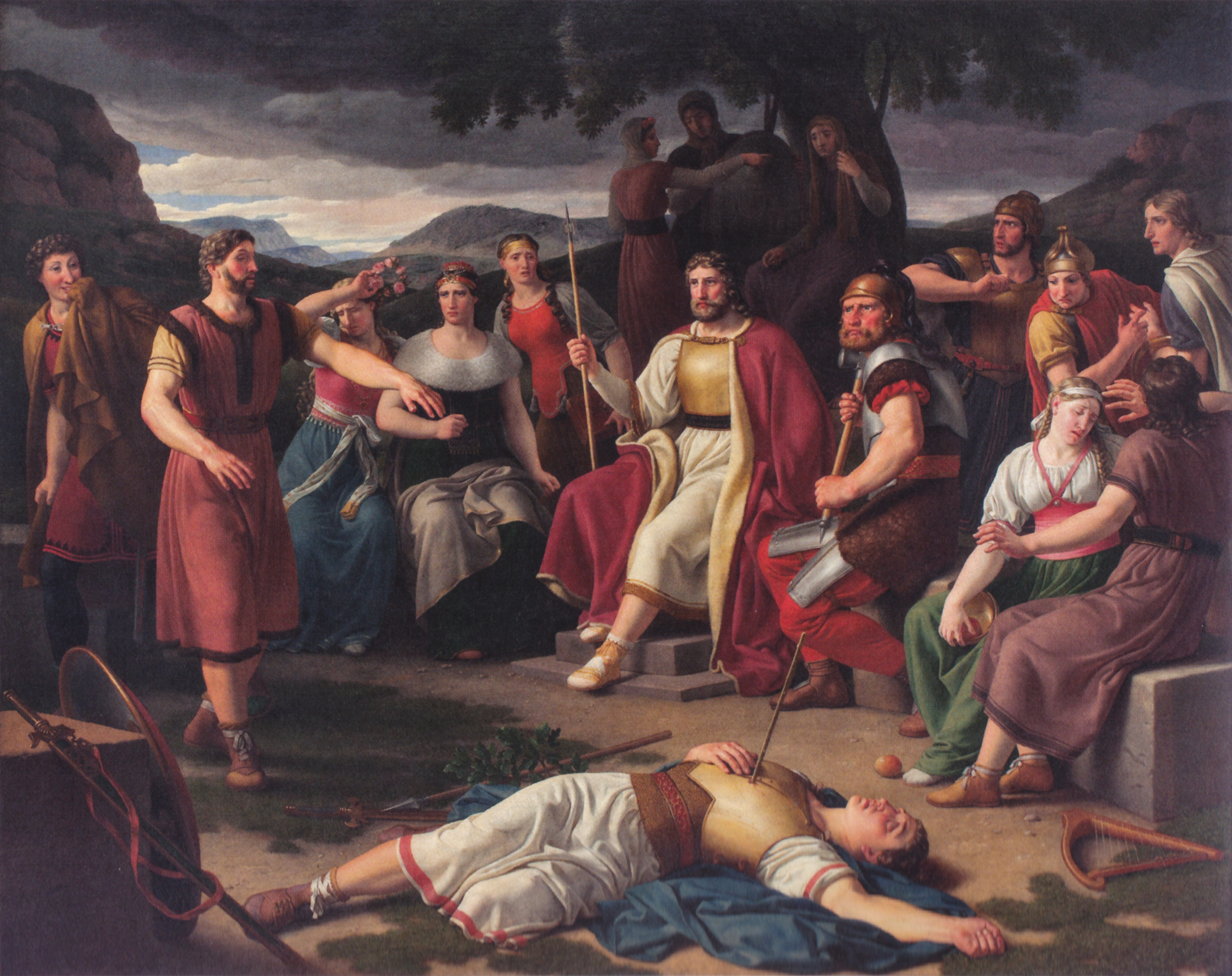
Eckersberg's The Death of Balder

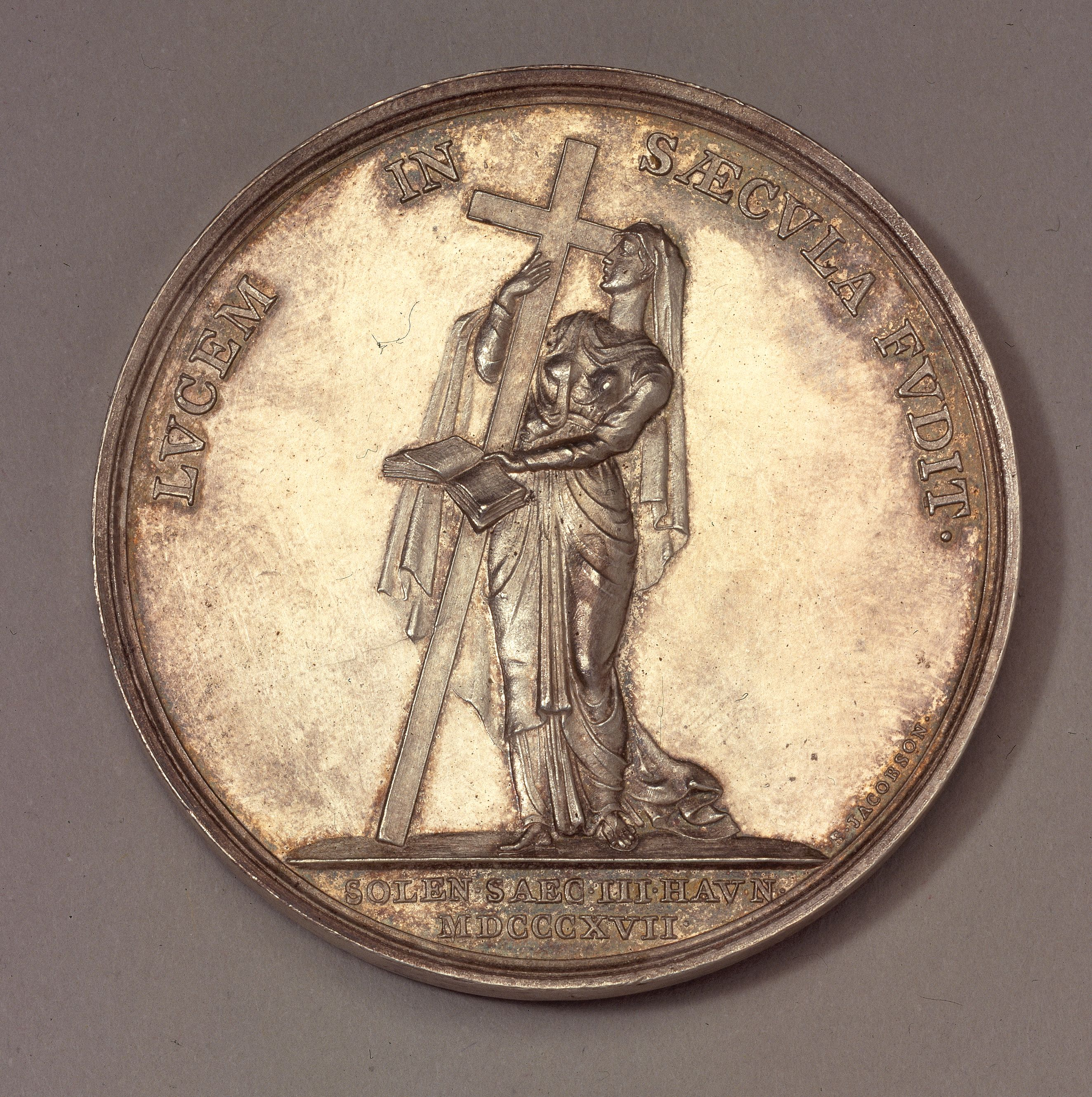
Medal commemorating the 300th anniversary of the Reformation

== Births ==
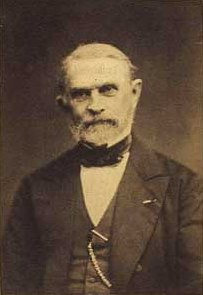
Johan Frederik Schlegel.

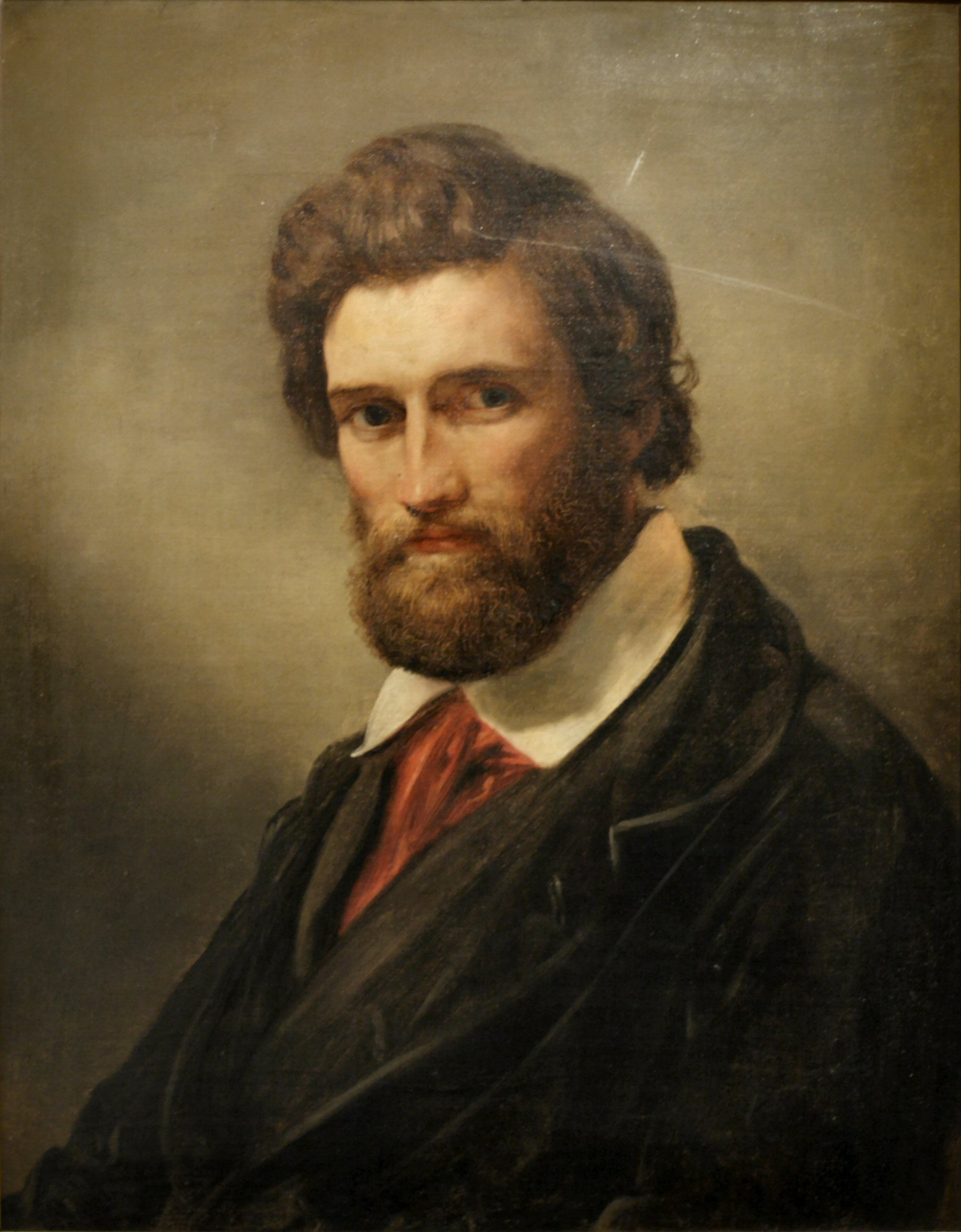
Harald Conradsen.

=== January–March ===
- 22 January – Johan Frederik Schlegel, lawyer and civil servant (died 1896)
- 30 January – Magnus Feilberg, bookseller and publisher (died 1900 in Norwau)
- 22 February – Niels Gade, composer (died 1890)

=== April–June ===
- 4 April – P. C. Skovgaard, national romantic landscape painter (died 1875)
- 5 April– Hansine Andræ, feminist (died 1898)
- 11 May – Frederik Hegel, bookseller and publisher (died 1887)
- 13 June – Knud Graah, industrial pioneer (died 1909).

=== July–September ===
- 7 July – Christen Andreas Fonnesbech, lawyer, landowner and politician (died 1880)
- 20 July – Johan Henrik Nebelong, architect (died 1871)

=== October–December ===
- 4 October – Andreas Frederik Krieger, politician (died 1893)
- 8 October – Ilia Fibiger, writer (born 1867)
- 26 October – Georg Grüner, landowner, politician and co-founder of Landmandsbanken (died 1890)
- 13 November – Franziska Carlsen, writer and local historian (died 1876)
- 17 November – Harald Conradsen, sculptor and medalist (died 1905)
- 8 December – Christian Emil Krag-Juel-Vind-Frijs, politician and landowner (died 1896)
- 10 December – Carl Otto Reventlow, philologist, developed a mnemonic system (died 1873)

== Deaths ==
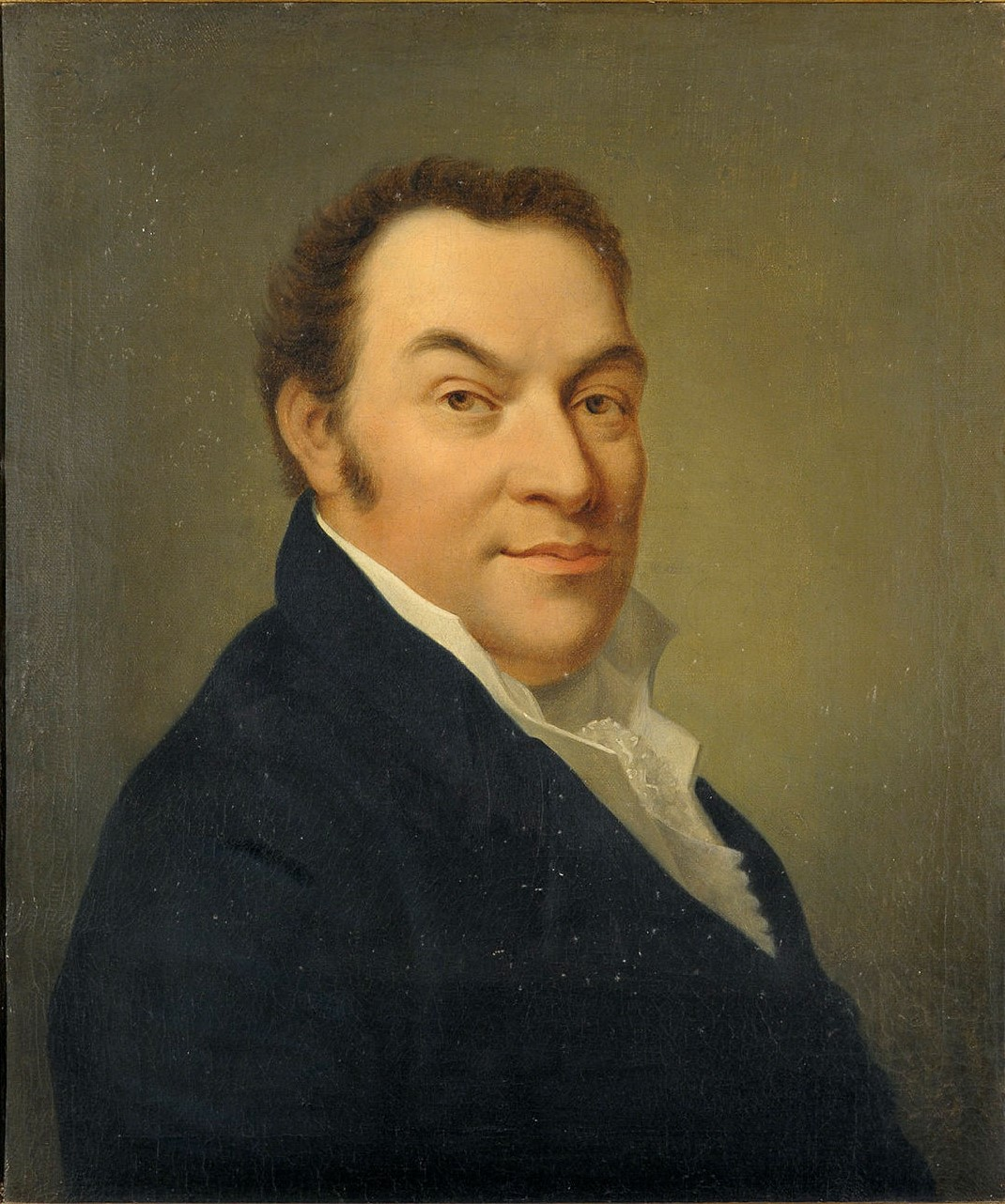
Caspar Peter Bügel.

- 10 May – Georg Haasm engraver /born 1861 in Germany)
- 6 April – Joachim Castenschiold, military officer (born 1743)
- 31 August – Hans Egede Saabye, priest and missionary (born 1746)
- 1 September – Caspar Peter Bügel, businessman (born 1759 in Hamburg)
- 18 November – Hans Rudolph Saabye, businessman (born 1751)
- 28 November – Johan Frederik Schultz printer and publisher (born 1756)

=== Full date missing ===
- Johanne Marie Malleville, royal favorite (born 1750)
- Moses Melchior, businessman (born 1736)
