= HDMS Indfødsretten =

HDMS Indfødsretten may refer to:

- HDMS Indfødsretten (1776), Danish ship of the line launched in 1776
- HDMS Indfødsretten (1786), Danish ship of the line launched in 1786
