= HDMS Ditmarsken =

Norwegian ship of the line

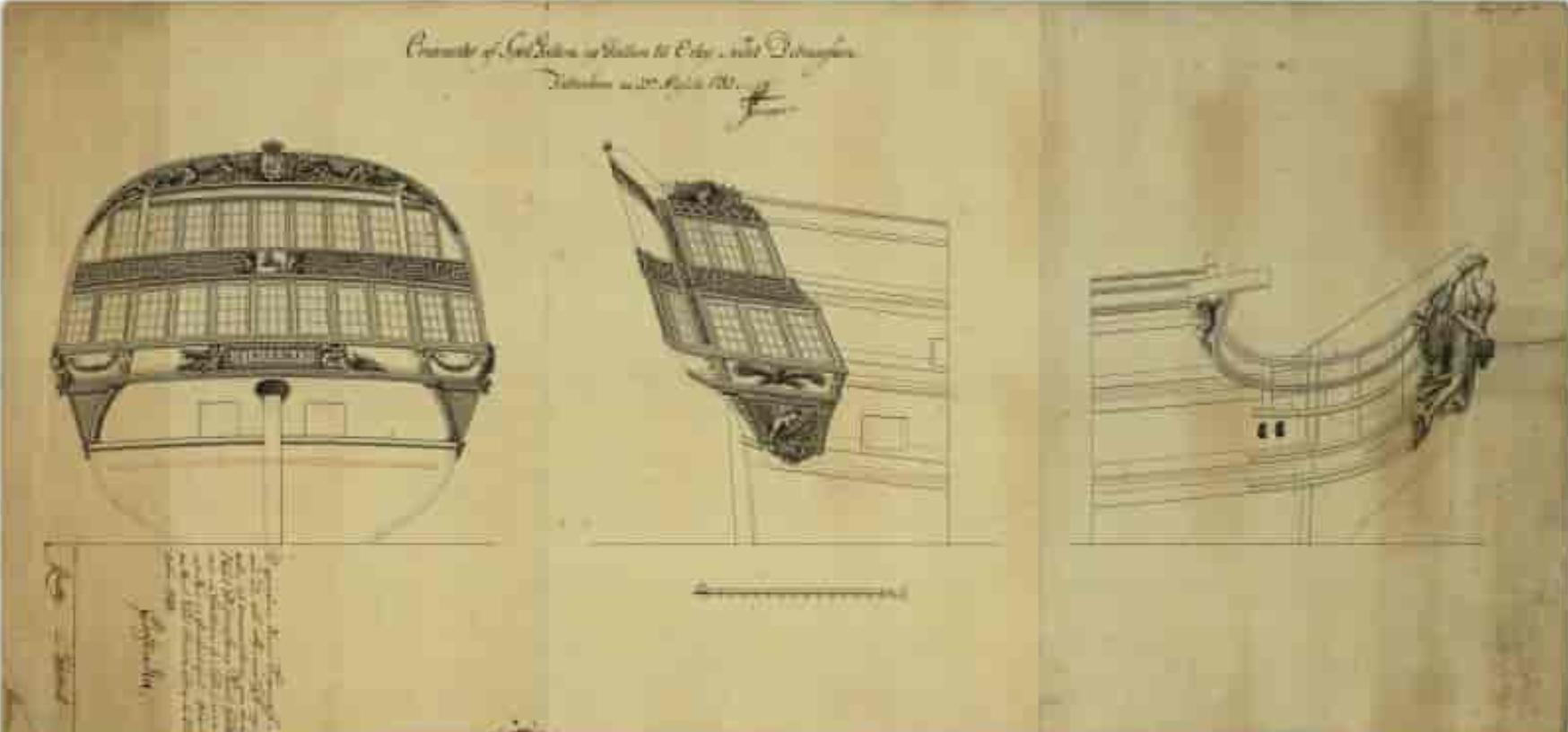

History
- Name: Ditmarsken
- Namesake: Ditmarschen
- Builder: Henrik Gerner, Nyholm, Copenhagen
- Laid down: 18 December 1779
- Launched: 25 November 1780
- Fate: Captured by the Royal Navy at the Battle of Copenhagen (1807)

General characteristics
- Type: Ship of the line
- Length: 158 ft (48 m)
- Beam: 43 ft (13 m)
- Sail plan: Full-rigged ship
- Complement: 559
- Armament: 64 guns

HDMS Ditmarsken (or Ditmarschen) was a 64-gun ship of the line of the Royal Dano-Norwegian Navy which was launched in 1780. She was captured by the British during the battle of Copenhagen in 1807 and burnt.

== Construction and design ==
Ditmarsken was constructed at Nyholm Dockyard to a design by Henrik Gerner. She was laid down on 17 December 1779, launched on 25 November 1780 and the construction was completed on 18 March 1783.

She was 158 ft (48 m) with a beam of 43 ft (13 m) and a draught of 18 ft (5.5 m). Her complement was 559 men and her armament was 64 guns.

== Career ==
In 1798 she was under the command of Just Bille. She was captured by the British during the battle of Copenhagen in 1807 and burnt.
