= Frederiksholms Kanal 16–18 =

Buildings in Copenhagen, Denmark

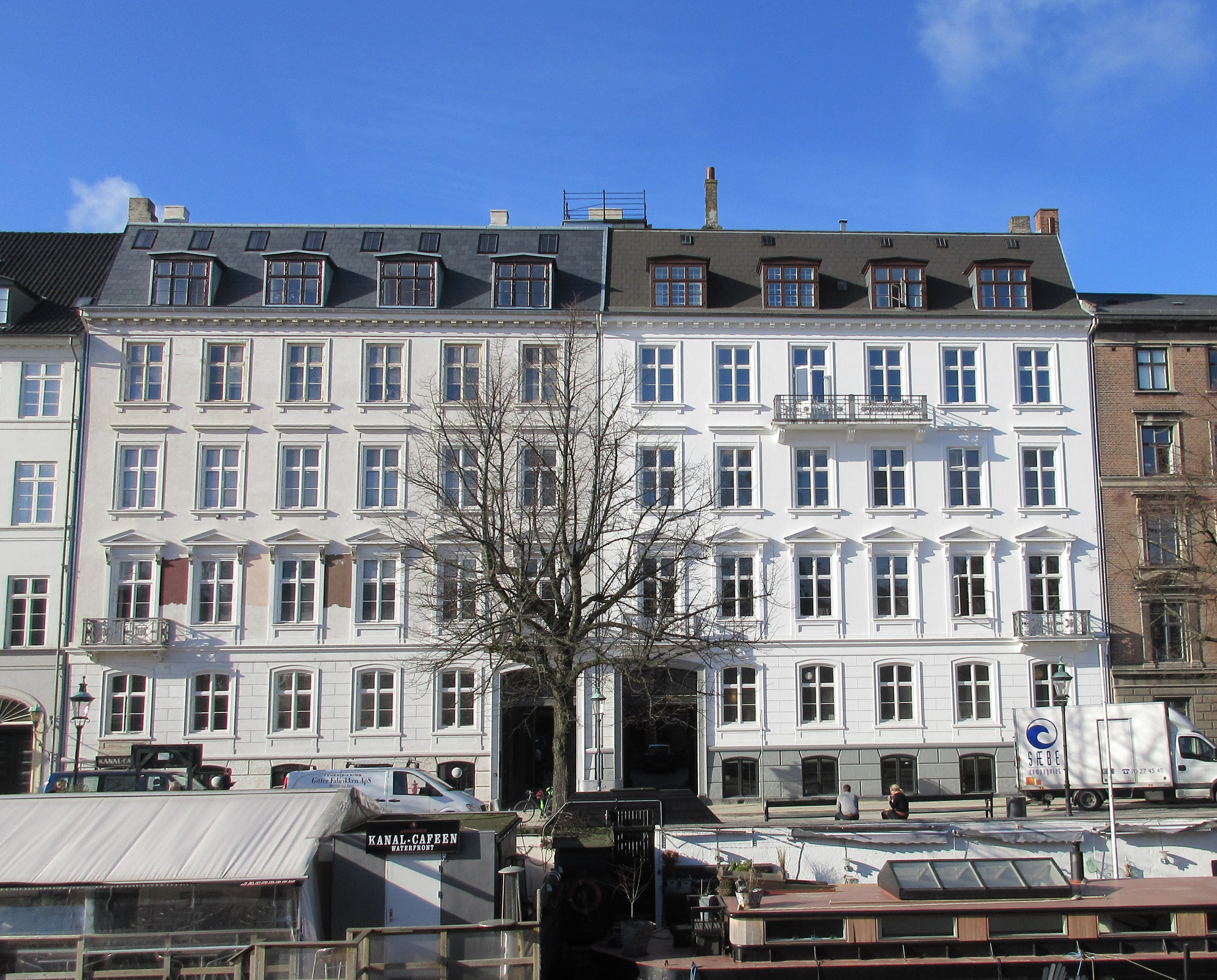
- Frederiksholms Kanal 16 seen from the other side of the canal
- Interactive map of the Frederiksholms Kanal 16–18 area

General information
- Location: Copenhagen, Denmark, Denmark 55°40′28.12″N 12°34′35.99″E
- Completed: 1852

Design and construction
- Architect: H. C. Stilling

Frederiksholms Kanal 16–18 are two almost identical listed properties overlooking Frederiksholm Canal in central Copenhagen, Denmark. The Victorian Home, a 15-room, late 19th-century bourgeois home now operated as a historic house museum by the National Museum of Denmark, is located on the second floor of No. 18. The Attorney general (Rigsadvokaten) is based at No. 16. Both buildings were listed on the Danish registry of protected buildings and places by the Danish Heritage Agency on 6 April 1969.

== History ==
=== Plessen's Mansion ===
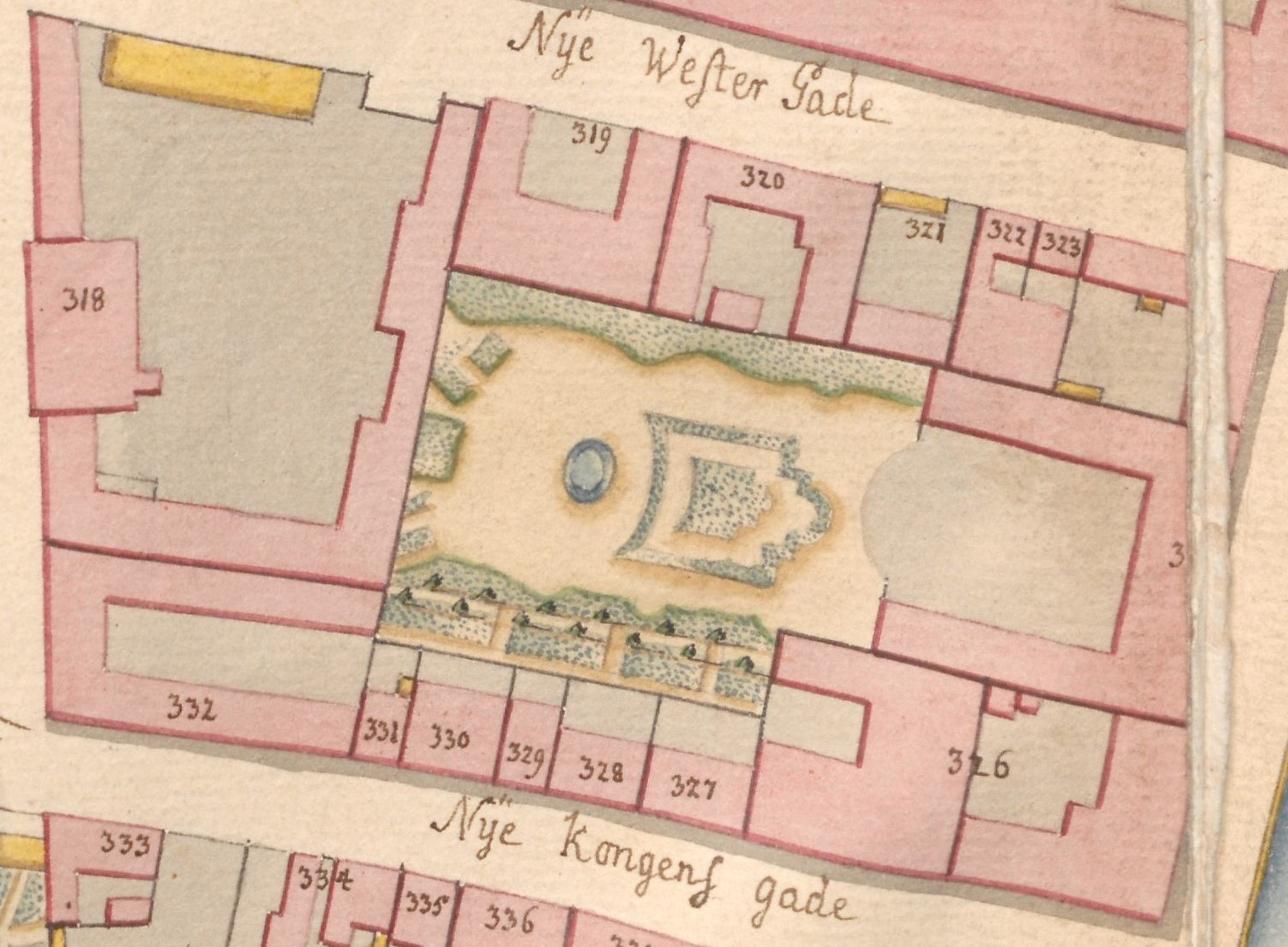
No. 325 seen in a detail from Christian Gedde's map of Copenhagen's West Quarter, 1757. Note: Only the "3--" is readable due to a folding damage.

The property on the site was listed in the Copenhagen's first cadastre of 1689 as No. 285 in the city's West Quarter, owned by customs inspector (toldforvalter) Laurids Eskildsen. The property was shortly thereafter sold to Christian Siegfred von Plessen (1646–1723). In the 1690s, he constructed a large town mansion with a Baroque garden on the rear. The property was after his death passed on to his son Ludvig von Plessen. His property was listed in the new cadastre of 1756 as No. 325 in the West Quarter. It was a two-storey building, with a long main wing along the canal and two secondary wings extending from its rear side along each side of a central courtyard. It had a large garden, which occupied the entire central part of the block.

=== Knuth and Lyche ===
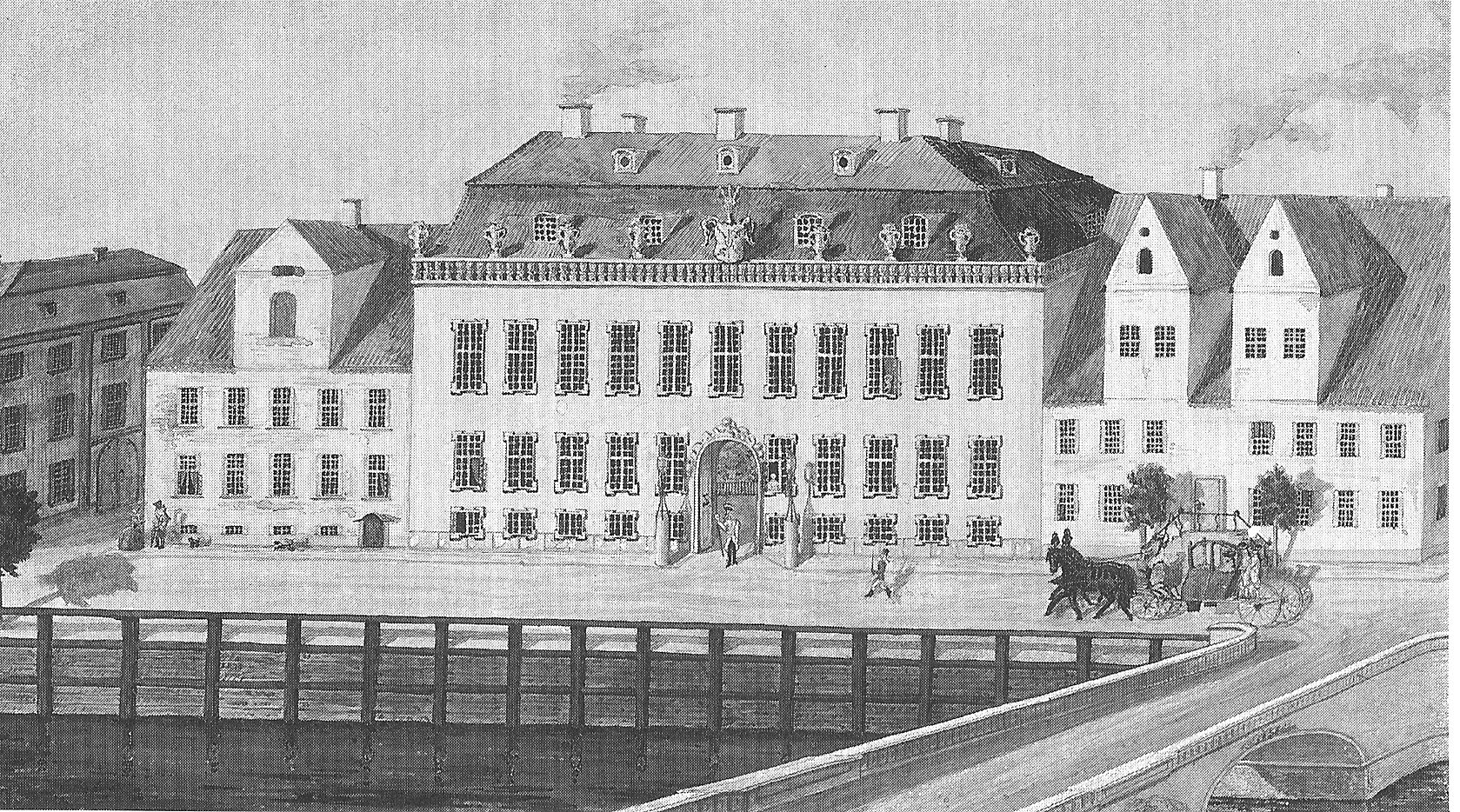
The Plessen Mansion

On 10 September 1759, No. 319, No. 321 and No. 325 were all sold to count Eggert Christopher Knuth. It was in his day known as the Knuthske Hotel (The Knuth Hotel).

Knuth died in 1776. On 14 June 1779, the mansion was sold to merchant supercargo in the Danish Asiatic Company Søren Lyche. He was later elected as one of the directors of the Danish Asiatic Company. He had previously owned the Cort Adeler House in Christianshavn.

=== 1800—1850 ===
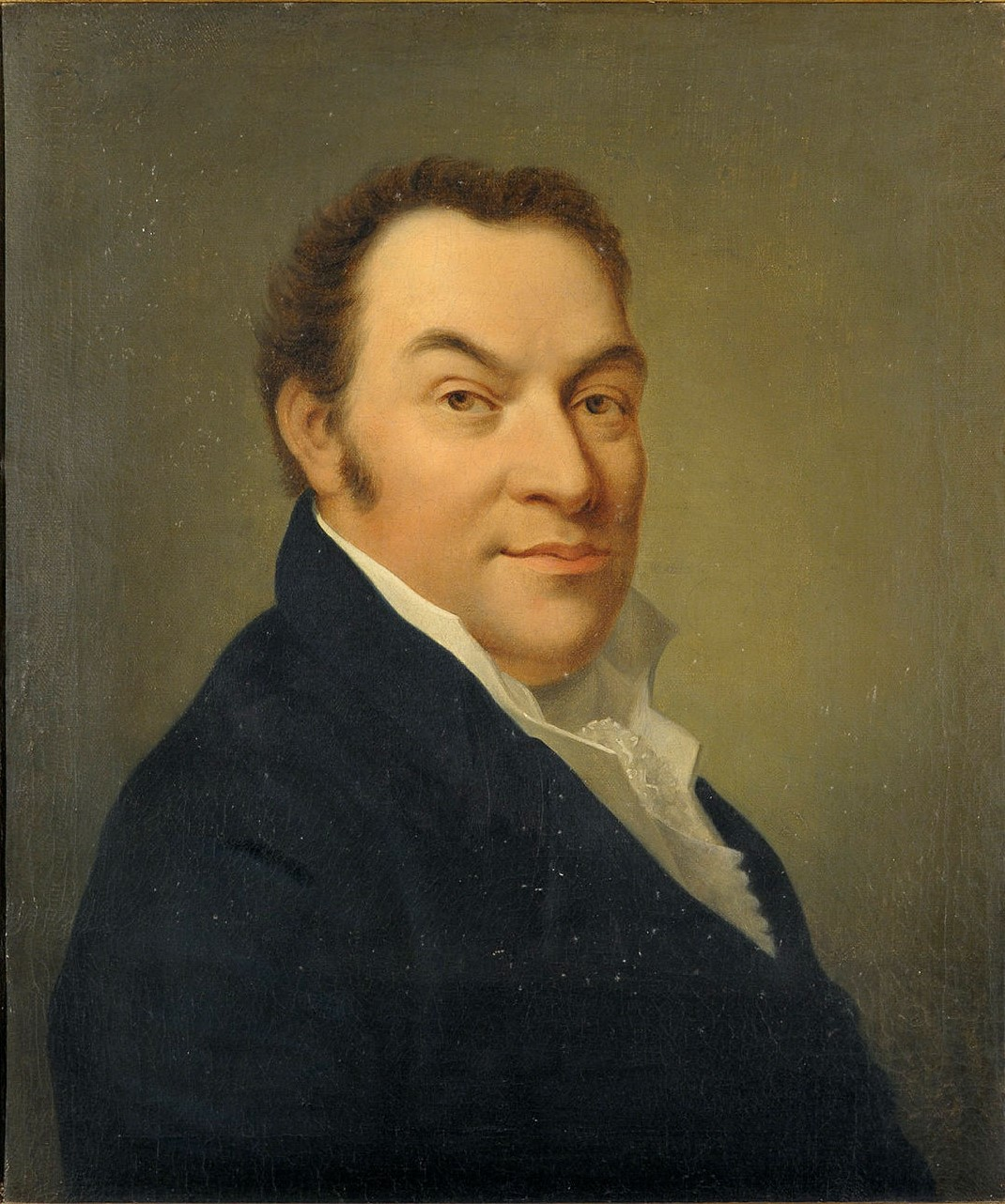
Caspar Peter Bügel

The property was at some point acquired by the businessman Caspar Peter Bügel. His property was listed in the new cadastre of 1806 as No. 243. He had also purchased the country house Bon Esperence in Charlottenlund. In 1809, he also acquired Ringsted Abbey for 330,000 Danish rigsdaler.

The next owner, Jens Lund, another merchant, constructed a couple of warehouses around the corner in Ny Vestergade. A freemason's lodge, Zorobabel af Nordstjernen, was based in the building in the 1790s. In the middle of the 19th century it had fallen into disrepair.

The property was later acquired by Det Forenede Borgerlige Selskab (founded in 1821), a merger of Dreyer's Club and a number of other clubs. Jean Baptist Oluf Gamél (1812–1886), a chef who acted as club host, resided on the first floor of the building at the time of the 1840 census. He lived there with his wife Andrine Cassine Gamel (née Stockfleth), their two children (aged one and two), two male servants and three maids.

=== Cassabadan and the new buildings ===
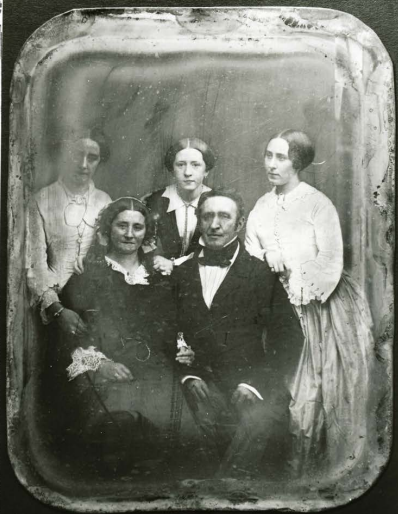
Alphonse Cassabadan with family, 1853

The neglected building was acquired by Alphonse Cassabadan. He had recently retired from his position as head chef for king Christian VIII. In 1851, No. 242 was divided into No. 242A (now Frederiksholms Kanal 16), and No. 242B (Frederiksholms Kanal 18). Cassabadan charged the architect Harald Conrad Stilling with transforming it into two separate apartment buildings in 1851–1852. Stilling added two extra floors. Cassabadan opened a bar in the basement of No. 242B.

The theologian N.F.S. Grundtvig and ballet master August Bournonville were anong the residents of the buildings in the building from 1852 to 1855. Count H. A. Reventlow-Criminil (1798–1869) was a resident in No. 242A in 1853.

The two buildings were listed as Frederiksholms Kanal 16 and Frederiksholms Kanal 18 when in 1859 house numbering (by street) was introduced as a supplement to the old cadastral numbers (by district).

=== Frederiksholms Kanal 16, 1859–present ===
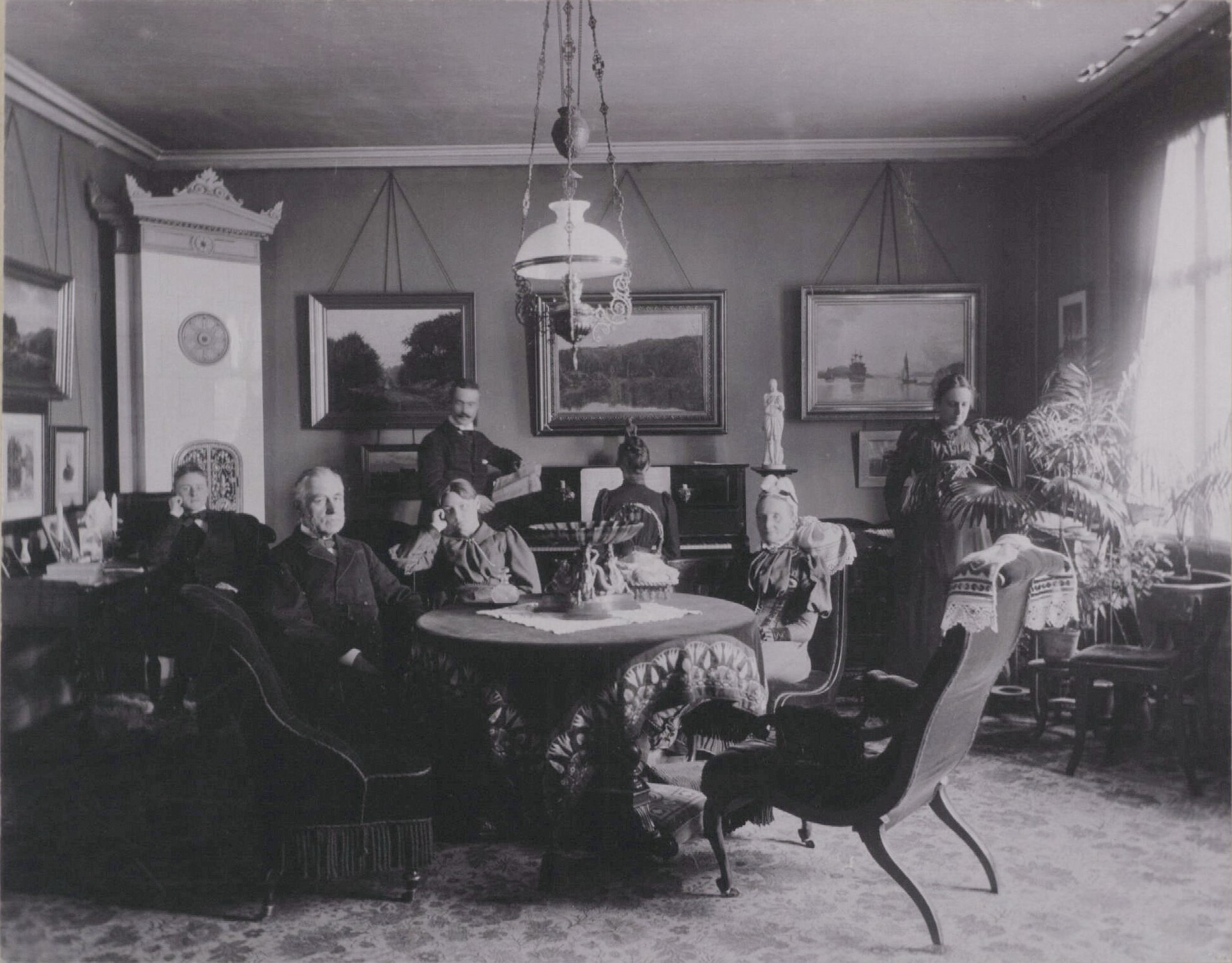
J. Bernburg with family at Frederiksholms Kanal 16

The businessman (grosserer) J. Bernburg resided in one of the apartments in the 1890s.

=== Frederiksholms Kanal 18, 1859–present ===
George Quaade, who had been appointed to Minister of Education on 1 July 1864, lived at No. 18 in 1865. The publisher and Venstre politician Christen Berg (1829–1891) lived in the ground floor of No. 18 in 1885–1886. The writer and educator Johan Krohn (1841–1925) from 1875 to 1879.

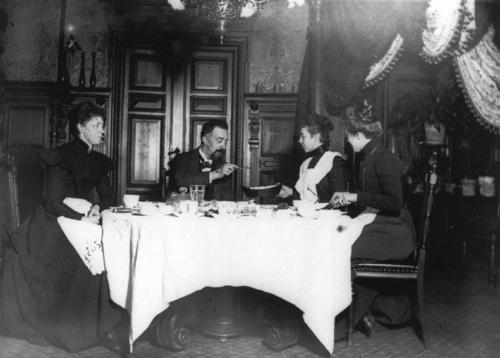
Rudolph Christensen and his family at the dinner table, c. 1905

Nr. 18 was acquired by the grocer Rudolph Christensen (1849–1925) in 1886. He was the joint owner of the ribbon factory Christensen og Hansen. The company had a shop on Østergade. Christensen undertook a major renovation of the building. The Christensen family's own home, a 15-room apartment, was located on the second floor. The two daughters Gerda and Ellen Christensen lived in the apartment until 1963 and left it with all its furnishings to the National Museum of Denmark.

== Architecture ==
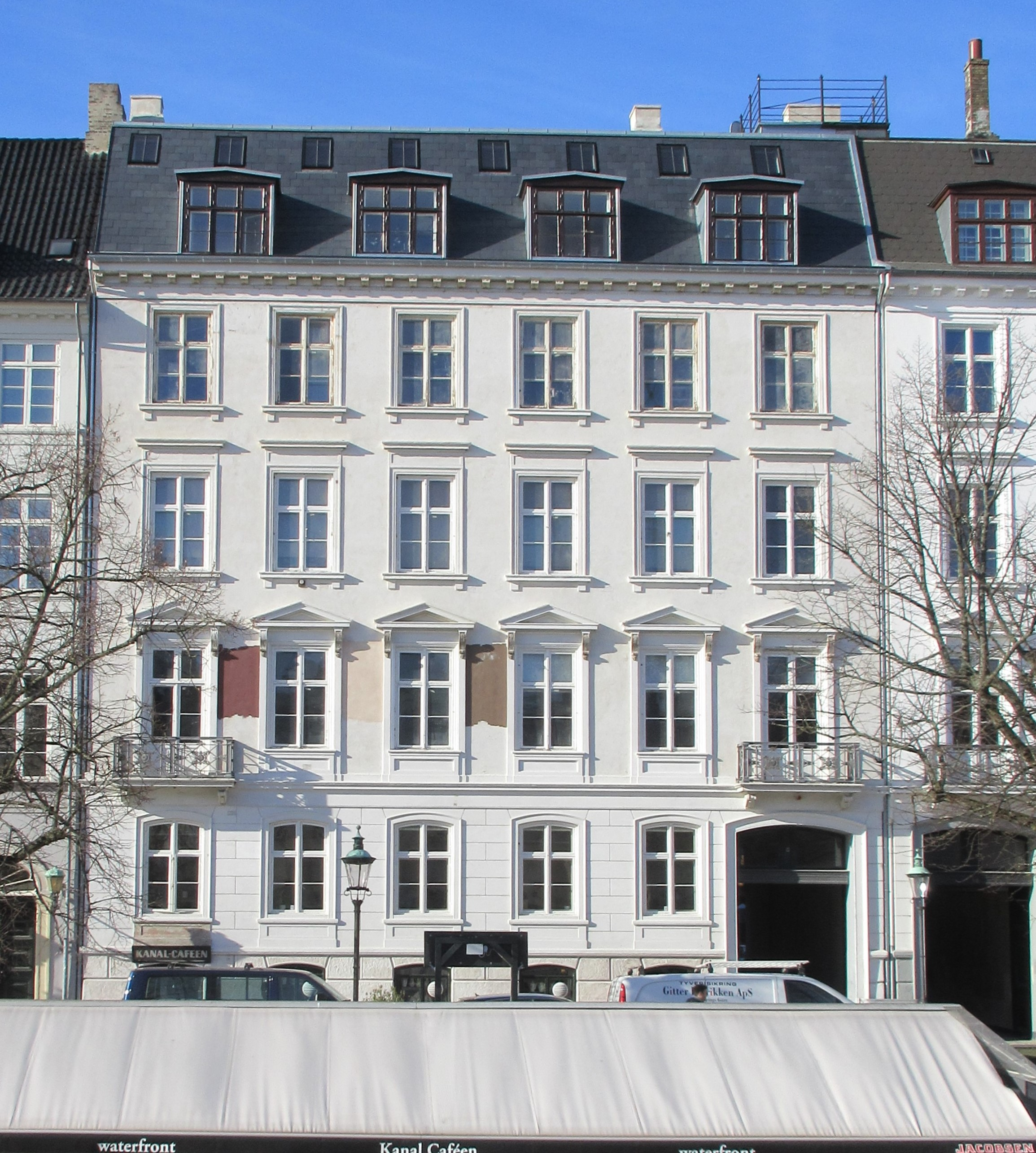
Frederiksholms Kanal 16

Each building consists of four storeys over a high cellar and a mansard roof. They are six bays wide. Both buildings have a balcony at each of the outer bays on the first floor and No. 16 has an additional balcony in front of the two central bays on the top floor.

The interior of the two gateways are decorated with a copy of Bertel Thorvaldsen's Alexander frieze. The 35-metre-long and one-metre-tall relief frieze was originally commissioned for the papal Palazzo del Quirinale in 1912 in connection with Napoleon's planned visit to the city. It was completed in just three months.

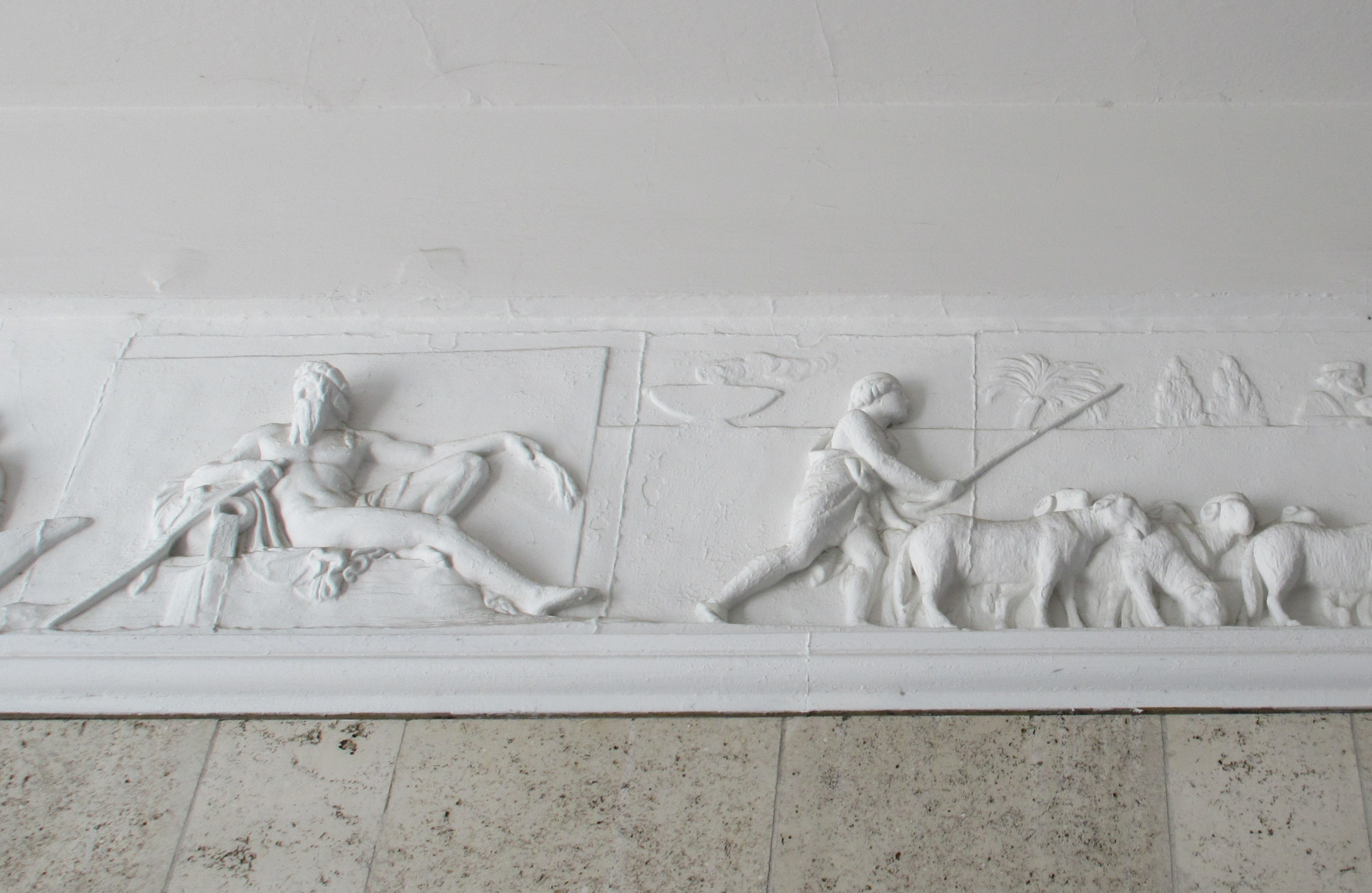
A section of Thorvaldsen's Alexander frieze from the gateway in No. 17

The walls of the staircase at No. 18 are richly decorated with murals created for Rudolph Christensen in the 1890s by C.W. Juulmann & Søn in Nørregade. The decorations include imitated marble panels and sandstone pilasters and painted ornaments. The landings feature murals of landscapes and houses. One of them is of the Christensens family's first country house at Jægersborg Allé.

== Today ==
The Attorney general (Rigsadvokaten) is based at No. 16. The Christensen family's 15-room apartment, now known as the Victorian Home (Danish: Klunkehjemmet), can only be visited on guided tours. Guided tours in English are available on Saturdays at 14:00 from June through September.

== Gallery ==
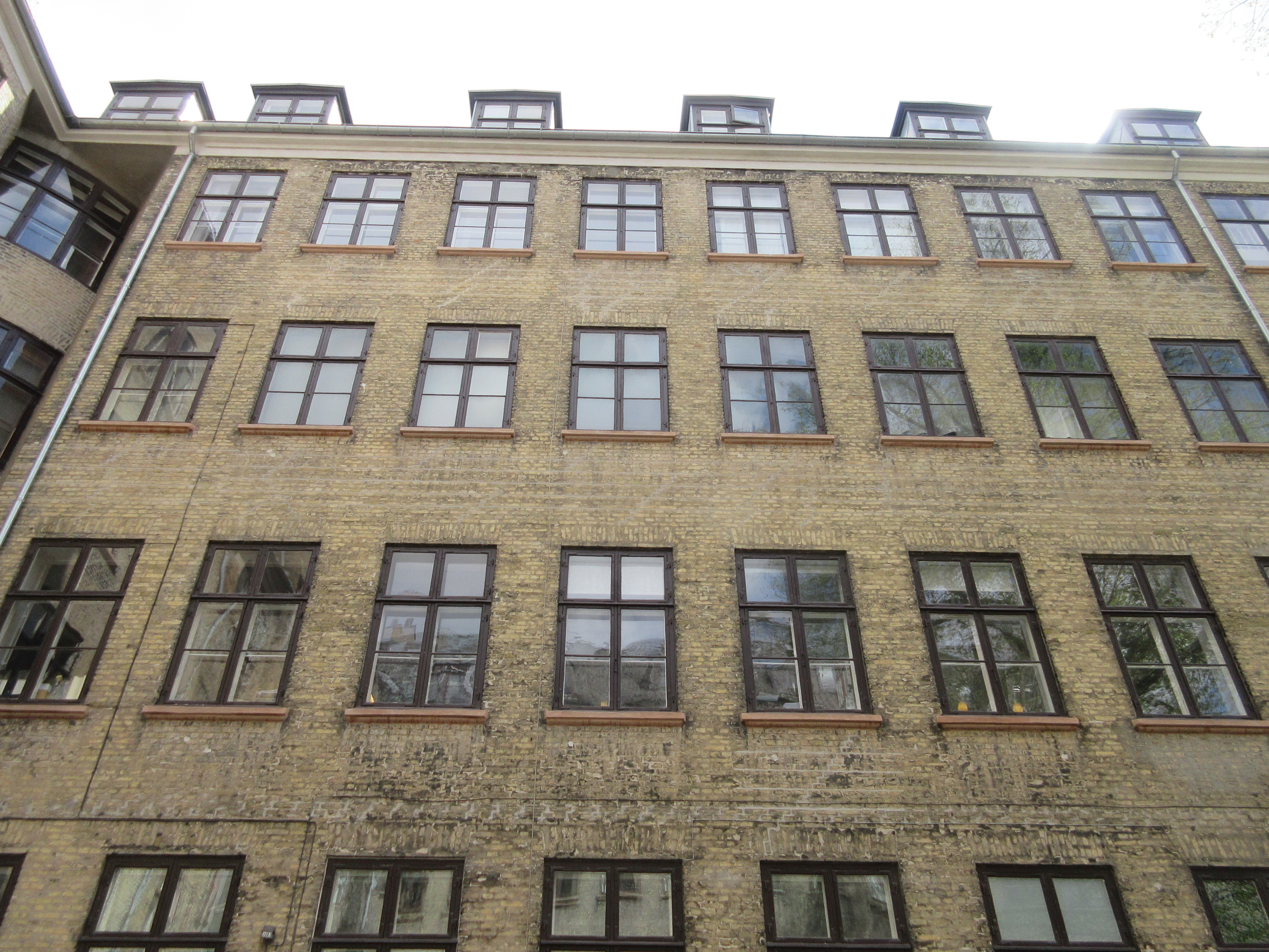
The 12-bay side wing of No. 18 seen from the courtyard

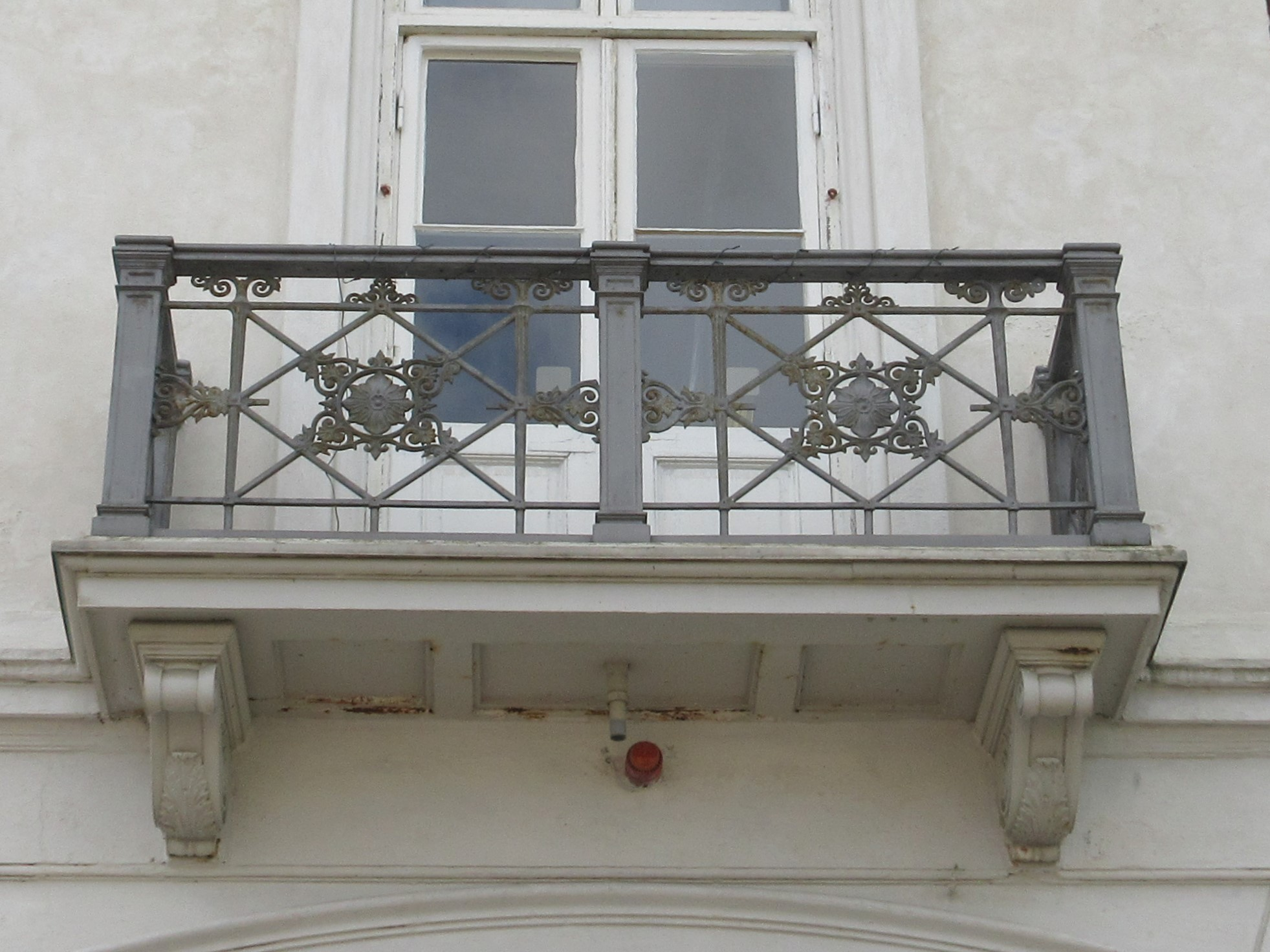
The balcony at No. 18

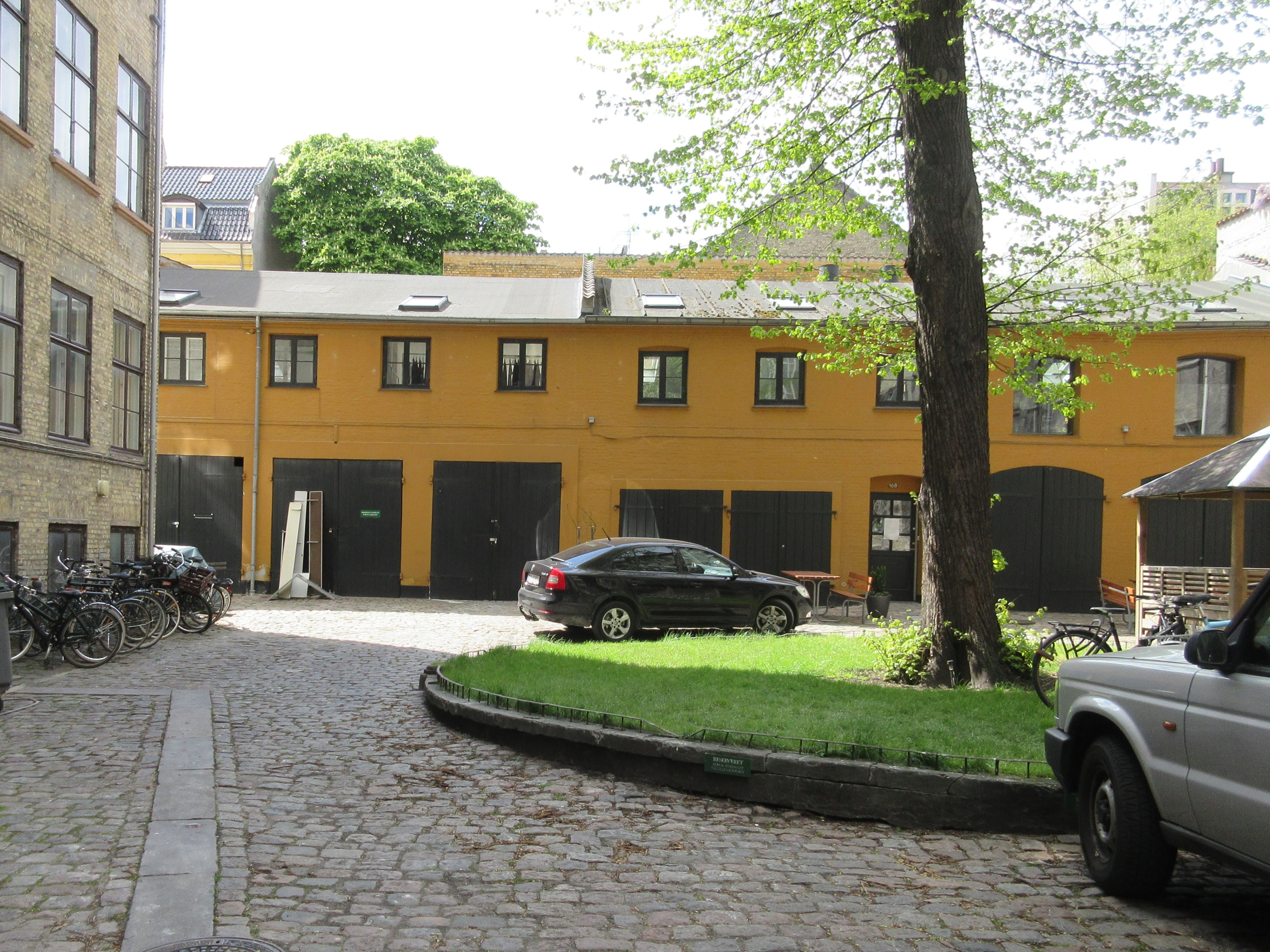
The two-storey rear sing

== See also ==
- Listed buildings in Copenhagen Municipality
