= Daniel Adzer =

Danish medal maker

Daniel Jensen Adzer
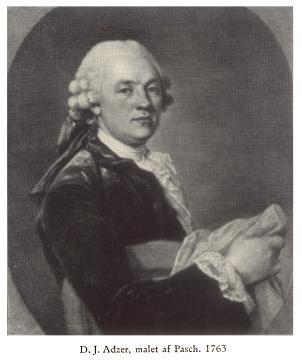
- Born: 17 January 1732; Copenhagen, Denmark
- Died: 3 April 1808 (aged 76); Copenhagen, Denmark
- Known for: Medallist

Daniel Jensen Adzer (17 January 1732 – 3 April 1808) was a Danish medallist (i.e., medal maker). He was appointed as royal medallist in 1766.

== Early life and education ==
Adzer was born on 17 January 1732 in Copenhagen, the son of master kleinsmede (i.e., a metal worker specialising in small articles) Jens Jensen Adzer and Maria Cathrine Jürgensen (c. 1696–1779). He initially apprenticed as a goldsmith in Copenhagen. In 1754, he traveled to Paris, where he met another young goldsmith from Copenhagen, J. H. Wolff, who inspired him to pursue a career as a medallist. He was subsequently articled to the medallist Jean Duvivier.

== Career ==
In 1757, Adzer returned to Copenhagen. His first work as a medallist was the reverse side of Magnus Gustav Arbien's medal to the Art Academy's patron, A. G. Moltke. After Arbien's death in 1760, he and Wolff were charged with the execution of a number of medals in conjunction with suverænitetsfesten. In 1761, he and Wolff travelled to Rome by way of Paris on a three-year travel stipend. On his return to Copenhagen, in August 1764, he became an associate member of the Art Academy. In 1766, he was created a full member of the Art Academy after submitting a new medal to A. G. Moltke as his reception piece. In 1776, he designed a medal commemorating the Danish Citizenship Act of 1776.

On 17 May 1766, Adzer was appointed as royal medallist with an annual salary of 250 rigsdaler. Over the next years he completed a total of 42 medals. These included medals commemorating the death of Frederick V and the anointing of Christian VII as well as medals to Frederick, Hereditary Prince of Denmark, and the Queen Dowager Juliane Marie, members of the Bernstorff family, and the scholars Langebek, Hielmstjerne and Suhm. He also created the University of Copenhagen's prize medal Pro Meritis. After 1784, he received only few assignments.

== Personal life ==
On 16 January 1767, Adzer married Christiane Frederikke Schäffer (1745-1833), a daughter of court master joiner Dietrich Schäffer (died c. 1778) and Wolber C. Bertram (c. 1712–75), at Jægersborg. They often spent the summers at Schæffergården. In 1781, he was awarded a residence at Charlottenborg Palace. Their daughter Catharina Maria Adzer (1767-1845) was married to the merchant Caspar Peter Bügel.

At the time of the 1801 census, Adzer resided with his wife at No. 299 in Sankt Ann's East Quarter. The miniature painter Cornelius Høyer, Høyer's father and professor Boye Magens were also part of the households. Adzer died on 3 April 1808 and is buried in Assistens Cemetery.

== Gallery ==
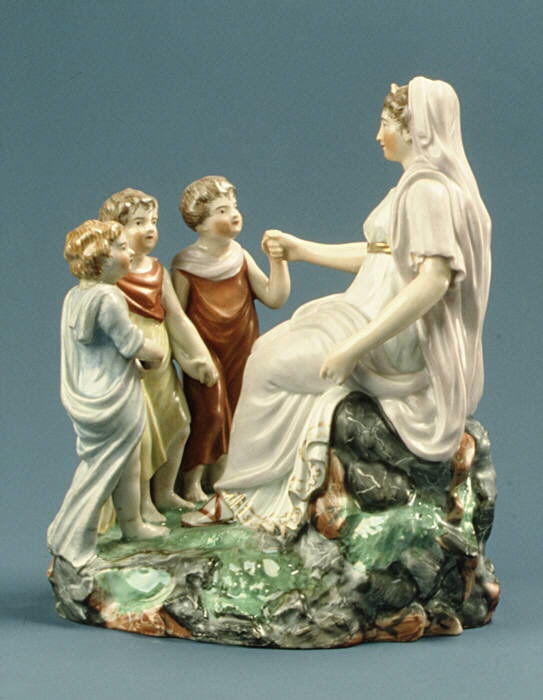
Porcelain figurine designed for the Royal Porcelain Manufactory in commemoration of Indfødsretsforordningen of 1776.

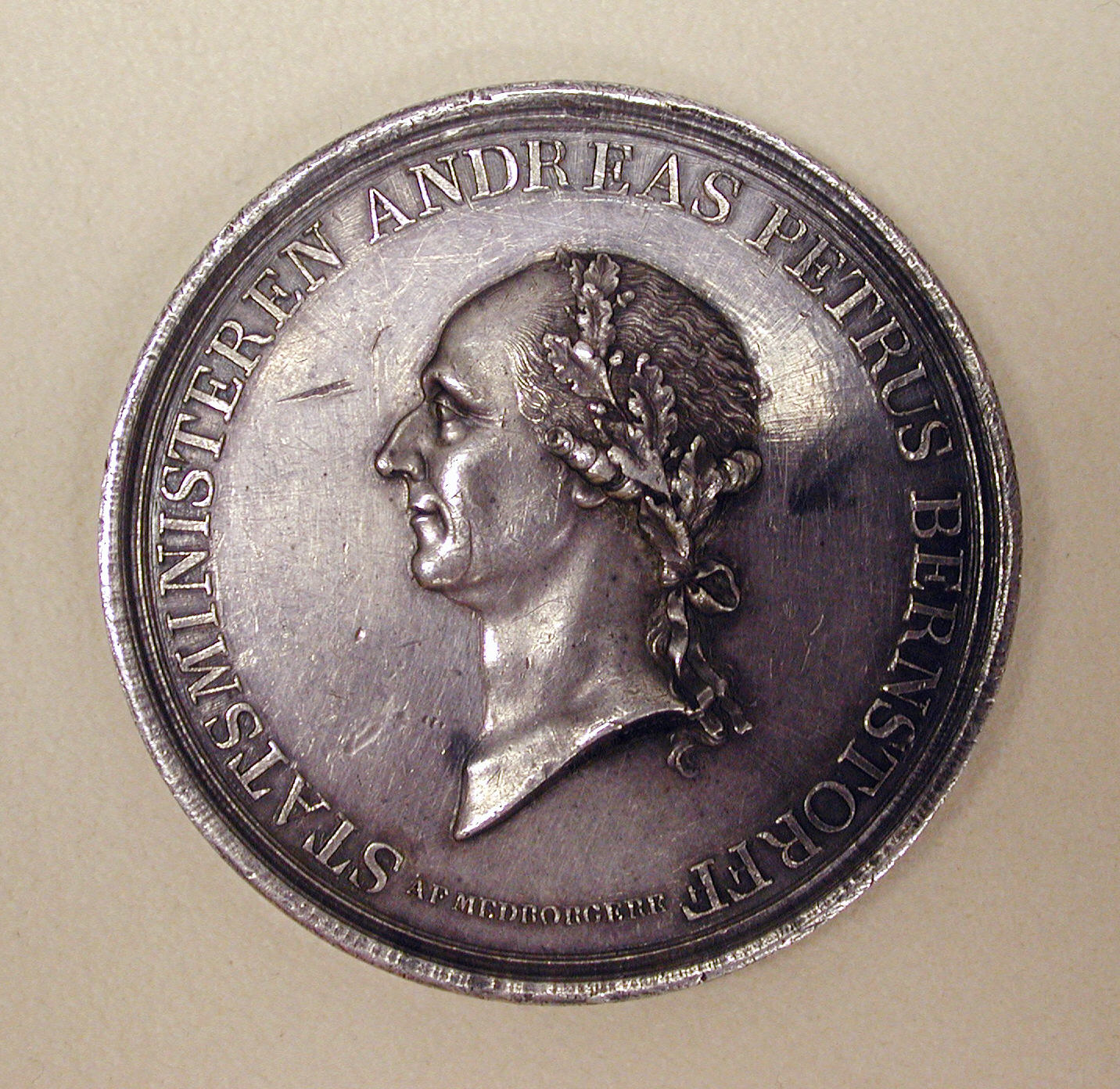
Front side of medal to Andreas Peter Bernstorff.

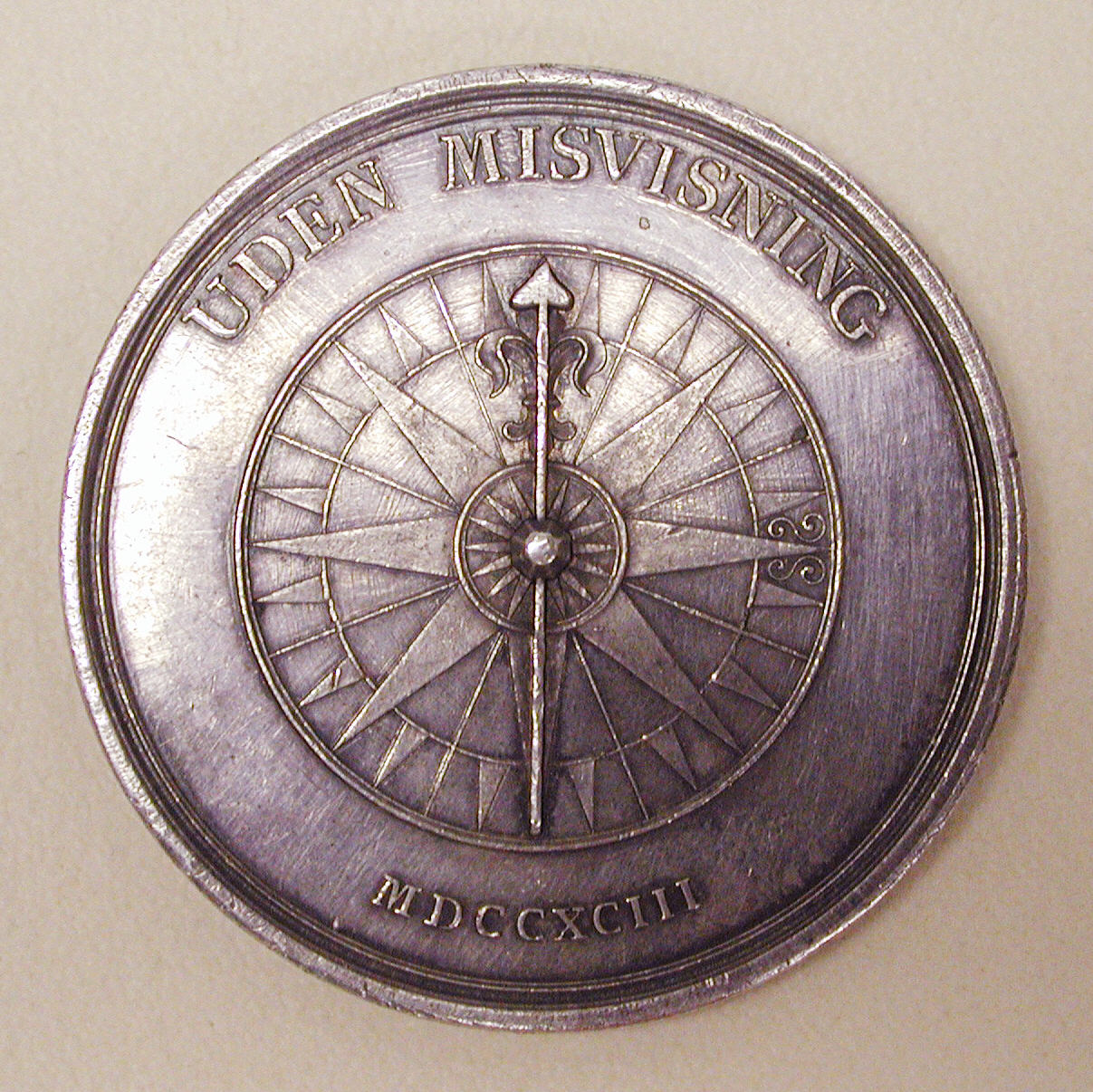
Reverse side of medal to Andreas Peter Bernstorff

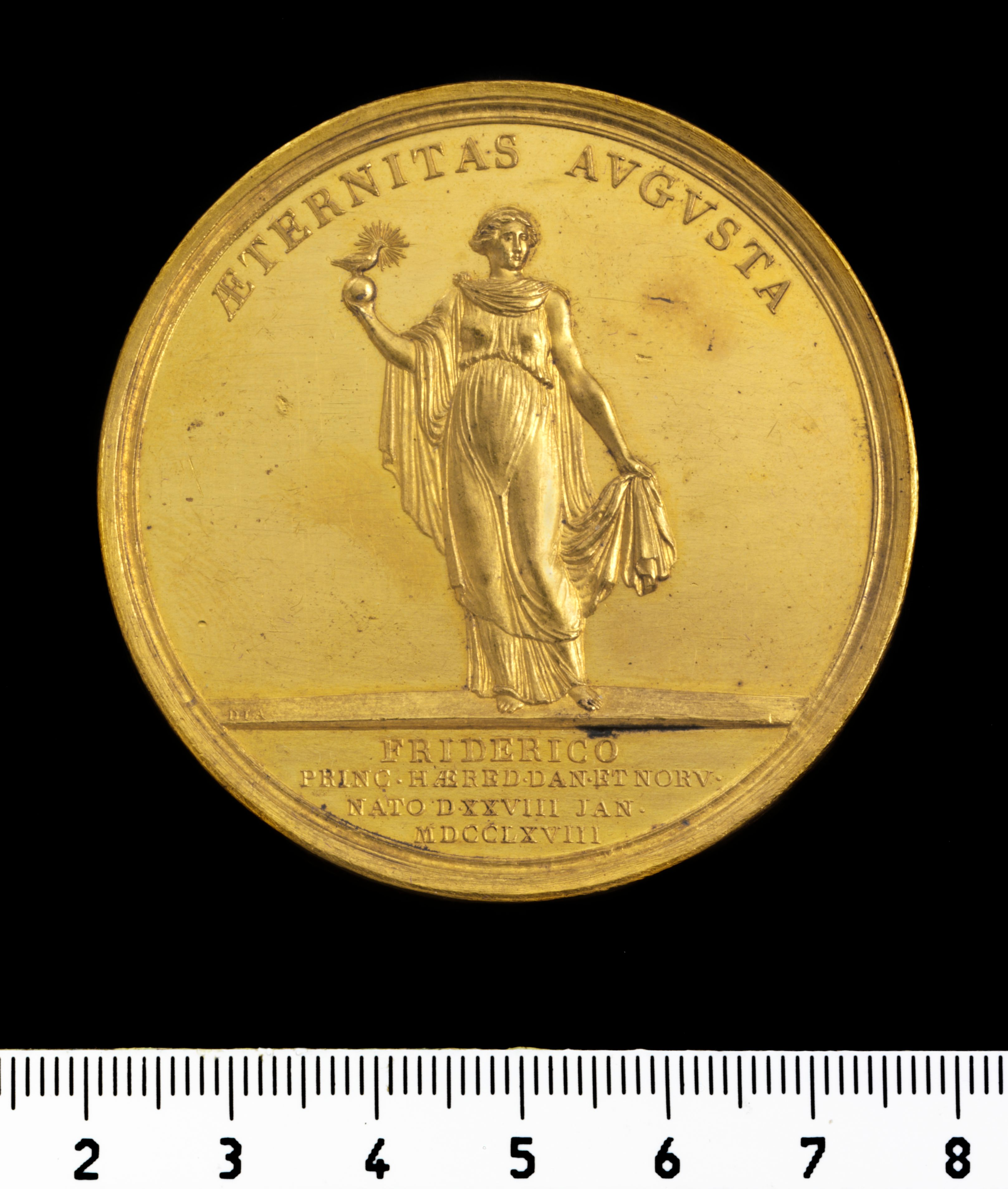
Medal commemorating the birth of Crown Prince Frederick (VI)

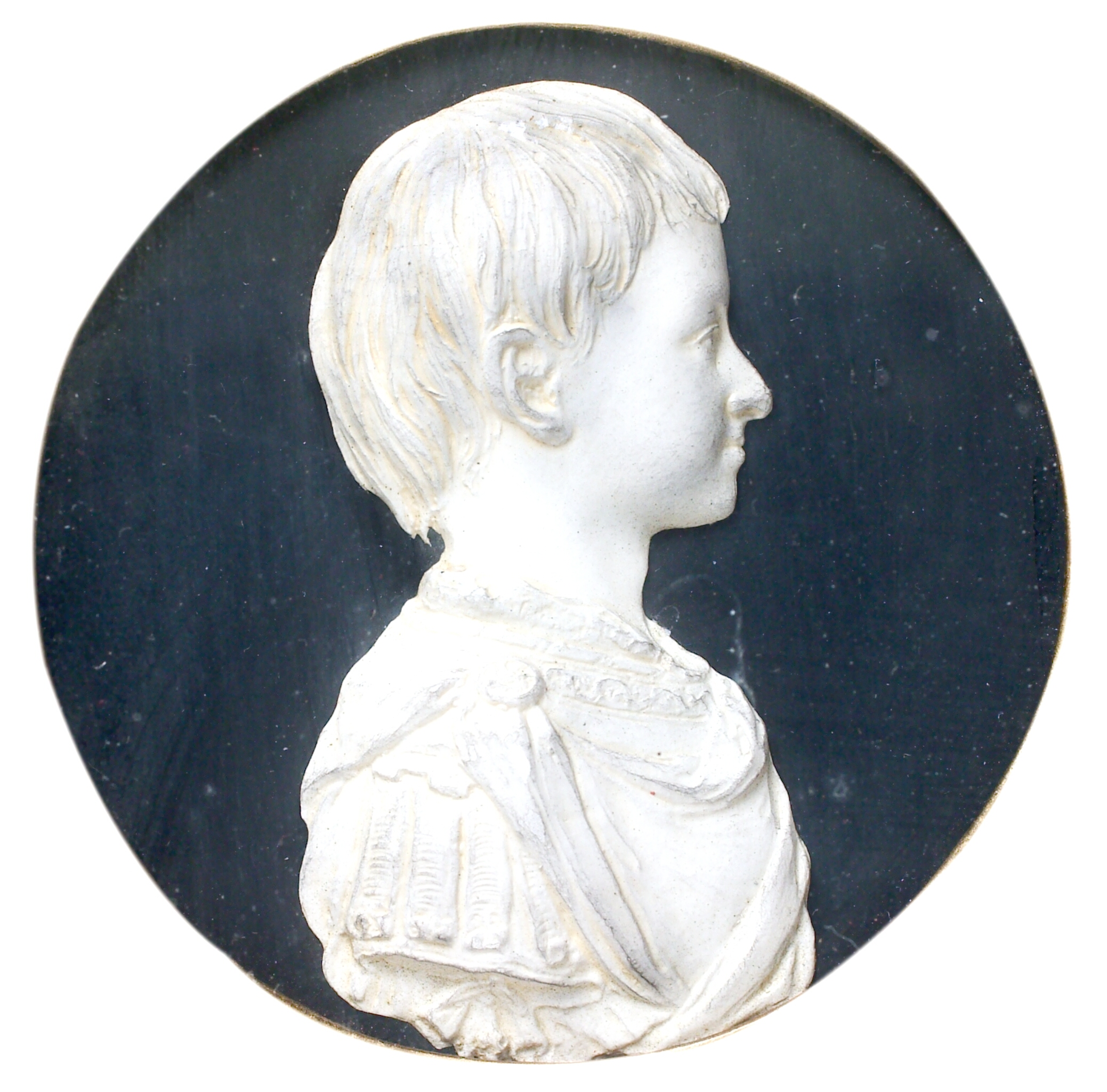
Plaster relief of Crown Prince Frederick (VI) as a child.
