= Danish Citizenship Act of 1776 =

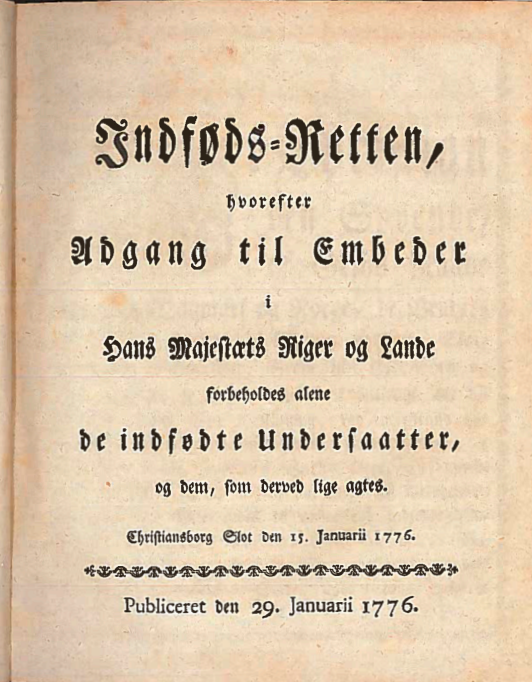
Front page of Indfødsretsforordningen

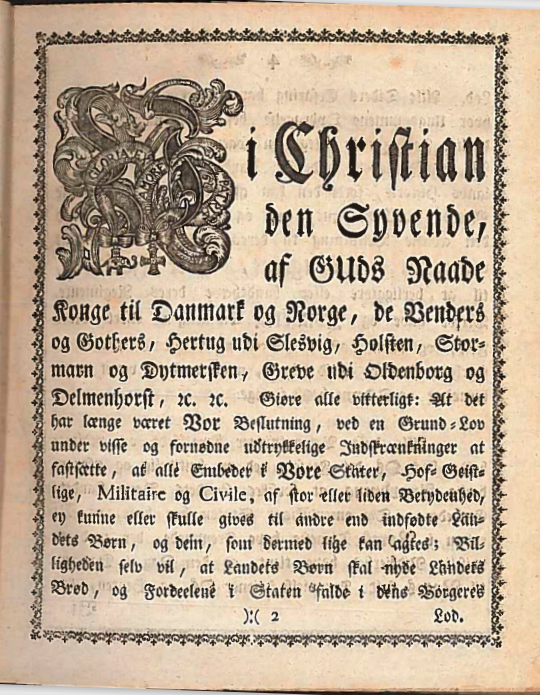
First page of the act

The Danish Citizenship Act of 1776 )Danish Indfødsretsforordningen af 1776 or simply Indfødsretten af 1776) was an act promulgated by Christian VII under which access to public positions in the kingdom of Denmark became the prerogative of native-born subjects and those who were considered their equals.

== History ==
The Danish court was for centuries dominated by German-speaking aristocratic immigrants, culminating with Johann Friedrich Struensee's de facto rule in 1770-72. The Danish Citizenship Act of 1776 was created at the initiative of Ove Høegh-Guldberg in response to growing anti-German sentiment in the population following Struensee's fall in 1772, especially among the country's emerging bourgeoisie. The act was proclaimed on Christian VII's birthday (29 January 1776), giving the right of citizenship constitutional status, and the king promised that it would never be withdrawn. After that, attaining office was only possible for those born in the state, which was defined as all of the king's kingdoms and lands, i.e. Denmark, Norway and the Duchies of Schleswig and Holstein.

Exemptions aimed at attracting wealthy foreigners were few. The right of citizenship legitimized the national identity that had developed in bourgeois Danish circles, where the law was received with enthusiasm. However, it did not eradicate Danish dislike of the king's German-speaking subjects, which culminated in the German Feud (Tyskerfejden) of 1789-90.

With the adoption of the Danish constitution in 1849, the authority to grant naturalisation was transferred from the king to the parliament. Apart from its provisions on naturalisation, the Danish Citizenship Act of 1776 remained in force until 1898, when Denmark introduced its first general citizenship legislation with the adoption of the Act on the Acquisition and Loss of Citizenship (Lov om Rrhvervelse og Tab af Indfødsret).

== Content ==
Under the Danish Citizenship Act of 1776, only children born on Danish territory of Danish parents acquired indfødsret at birth. Children born on the territory to alien parents would have to remain in the Danish kingdom to meet its criteria. Immigrants could only acquire a status equal to that of native-born persons through naturalisation by royal decree.

== Commemoration ==
The Danish Citizenship Act of 1776 was proclaimed with great festivities. One of the Royal Danish Navy's ships of the line was given the name Indfødsretten to mark the event. After her loss in 1783 she was followed by another ship by the same name. A medal designed by Daniel Adzer was also struck to mark the event. A special Indfødsretten pattern (Indfødsretsstellet) was also commissioned from the Royal Porcelain Manufactory in Copenhagen. An allegorical porcelain figurine by Daniel Adzer was also produced by the same factory. Another allegorical sculpture was created by Nicolai Abildgaard.

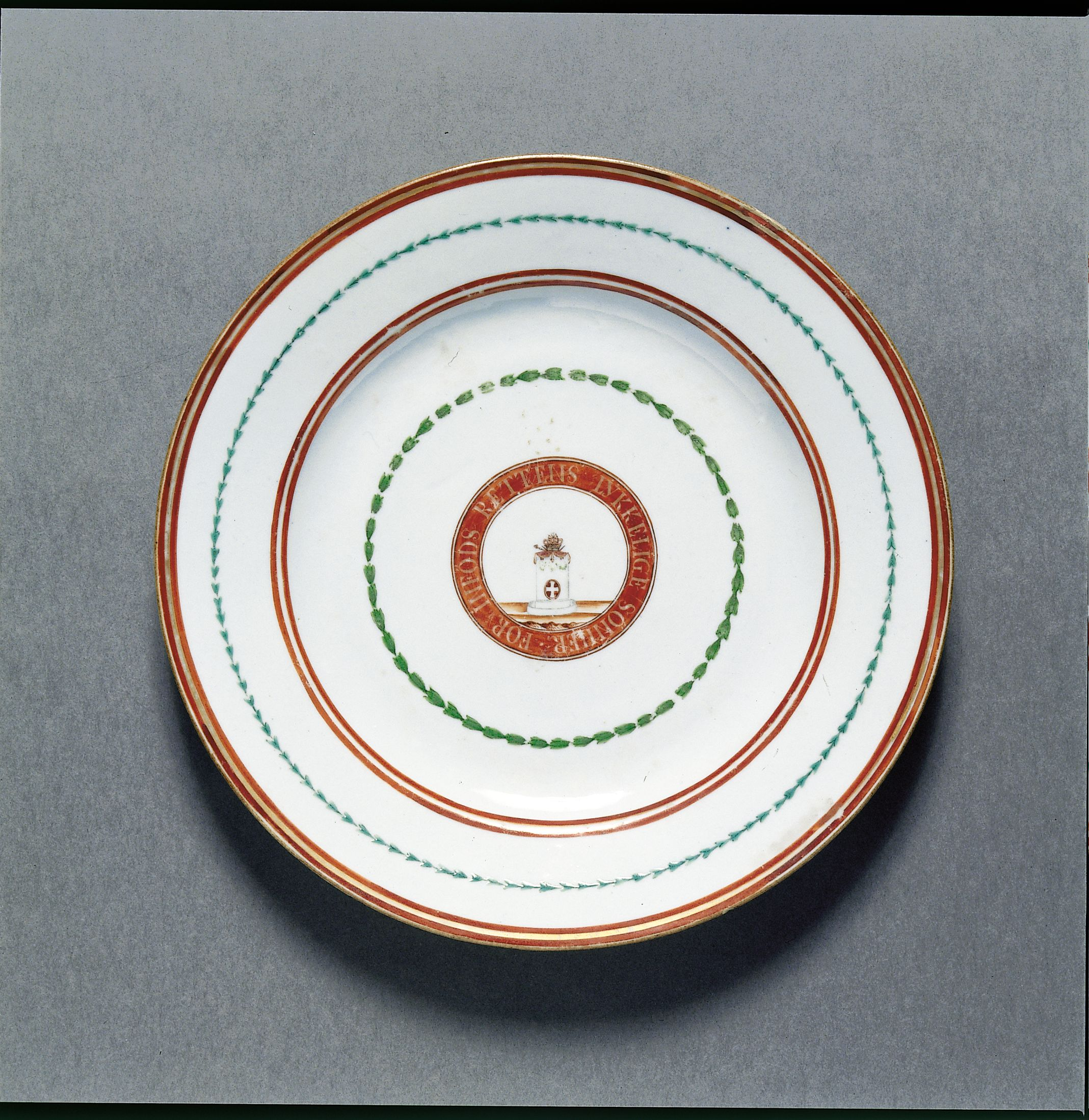
A plate with the Indfødsret pattern

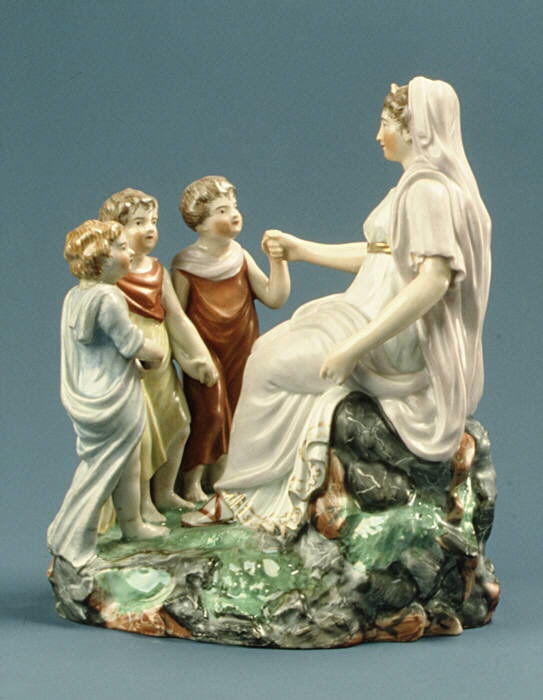
Daniel Adzer's allegorical porcelain figurine.

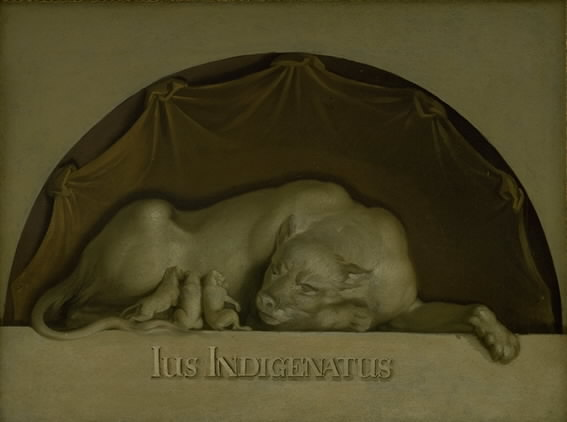
Abildgaard's allegorical sculpture.

== See also ==
- Mother Denmark
