= Magnus Feilberg =

Magnus Wogelius Feilberg (30 January 1817 – 5 June 1899) was a Danish-born Norwegian bookseller and publisher.

== Biography ==
Feilberg was born in Copenhagen, the son of Jens Christian Feilberg and Ovene Lucie Wogelius. He came to Norway in 1839. He was first employed by the Gyldendal publishing house. In 1843 he founded Feilberg & Landmark, a combined publishing house and bookstore, together with Jens Landmark (1817-1881). Feilberg was later among the founders of the Norwegian Booksellers Association in 1851, and chaired this organization from 1879 to 1886. After the death of Jens Landmark, the assets of the firm were acquired by Jacob Dybwad.
