= The Death of Balder =

Christoffer Wilhelm Eckersberg painting

The Death of Valder
- Balders død (Danish)
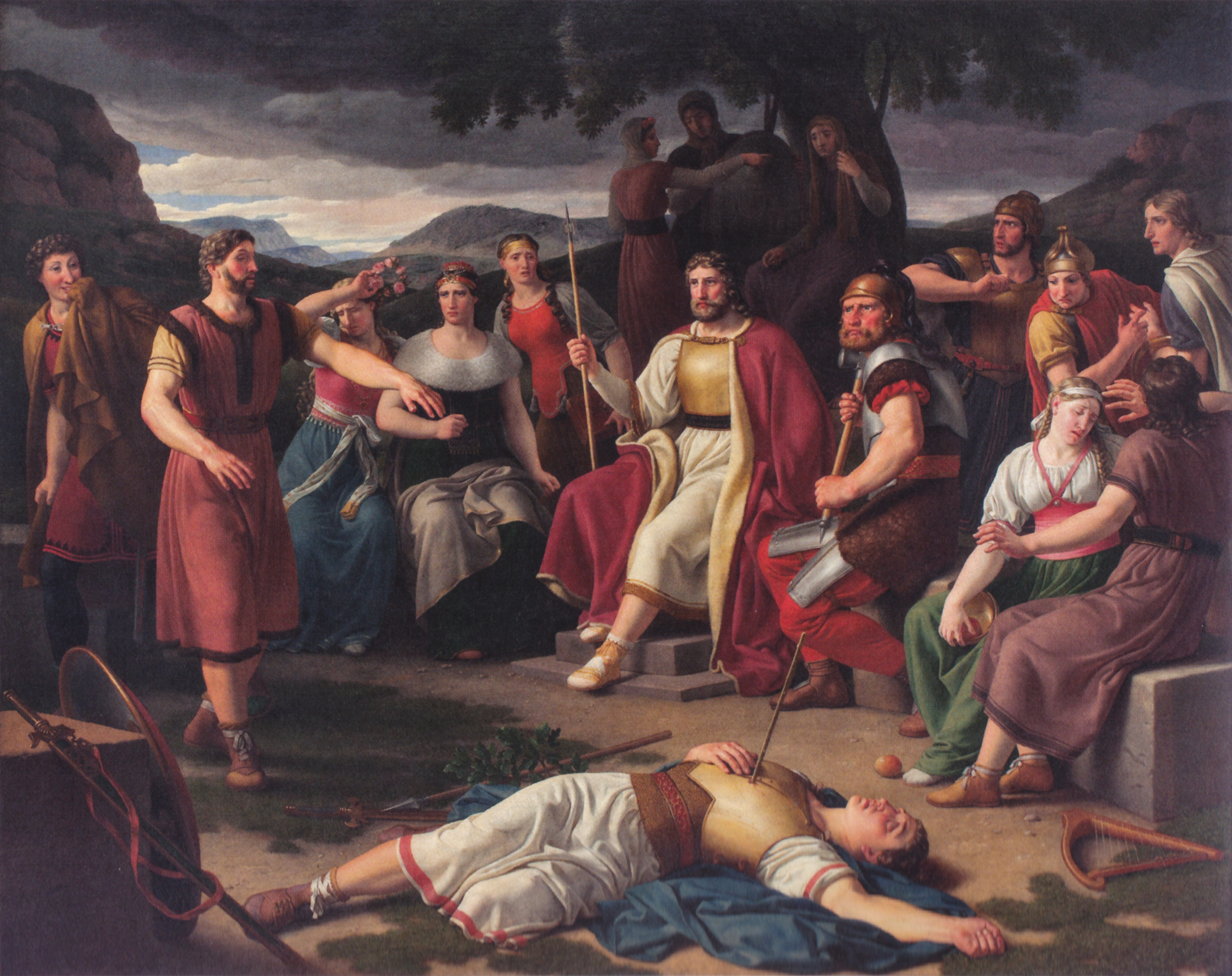
- Artist: Christoffer Wilhelm Eckersberg
- Year: 1817
- Medium: Oil on canvas
- Dimensions: 142 cm × 178.3 cm (56 in × 70.2 in)
- Location: Royal Danish Academy of Fine Arts, Copenhagen

The Death of Balder (Danish: Balders død) is an 1817 oil-on-canvas painting by Christoffer Wilhelm Eckersberg, depicting the well-known, eponymous legend from Norse mythology in which Balder is killed by a mistletoe arrow. Eckersberg's admission painting for admission into the Royal Danish Academy of Fine Arts' Academy Council, it now hangs in Charlottenborg Palace on Kongens Nytorv in Copenhagen.

== History ==
In 1775, Johannes Ewald wrote the opera The Death of Balder based on Saxo Grammaticus's work Gesta Danorum. Johannes Wiedewelt created a series of illustrations for the printed edition, and Johann Hartmann wrote the music for the opera.

In 1801, Adam Oehlenschläger argued that Danish art should use Nordic themes instead of relying on Greek mythology for inspiration, as they would stimulate people's love for their homeland. A number of publications, including most notably N. F. S. Grundtvig's Nordens mytologi (1808) and Nordiske Digte (1807) and Oehlenschläger's Nordens Guder (1819), contributed to promoting interest in the subject among both artists and the general public. The new trend was met with criticism from others, who observed that medieval sources did not provide any type of reference or information relevant to their images. This so-called Mythology Dispute dominated the Danish art scene in the years between 1812 and 1821, dividing the Royal Danish Academy of Fine Arts. In 1814, upon orders from Crown Prince Christian, it was made mandatory for the academy's professor of history to include Nordic history and mythology in his teachings. It was also proposed to reproduce Wiedewelt's illustrations for Ewald's The Death of Balder. In 1819 and 1828, Finnur Magnússon was engaged as an instructor in mythology and Nordic literature for art students.

Shortly after his return to Denmark from Rome, Christoffer Wilhelm Eckersberg arranged for his admission into the academy. He was presented with the death of Baldur as the subject of his admission painting. Eckersberg based his painting on two literary sources, namely the Prose Edda and Oehlenschläger's Baldur hin gode (1807). In October 1817, Eckersberg was unanimously admitted into the academy council.

== Description ==
In Eckersberg's painting, Baldr is seen lying in the foreground. He has just been hit by Höd's mistletoe arrow. Höd, Baldr's blind brother, is standing on the left, stretching his arms out. On the very left, Loki tries to conceal his smile. Odin is sitting in the middle of the Æsir. Thor with Mjölnir sits on Odin's left (the viewer's right). The three norns are seen in the background next to the Yggdrasil tree. They are dressed in simple and very dark clothes, almost like peasant women. Their faces are low and sad. Urd points her finger in the direction of Skuld. Verdandi holds a large shield in her hands, decorated with the sun, moon and two stars.

== Related works ==
The Danish National Gallery owns three sketches for the portraits of Balder, Thor and Host.

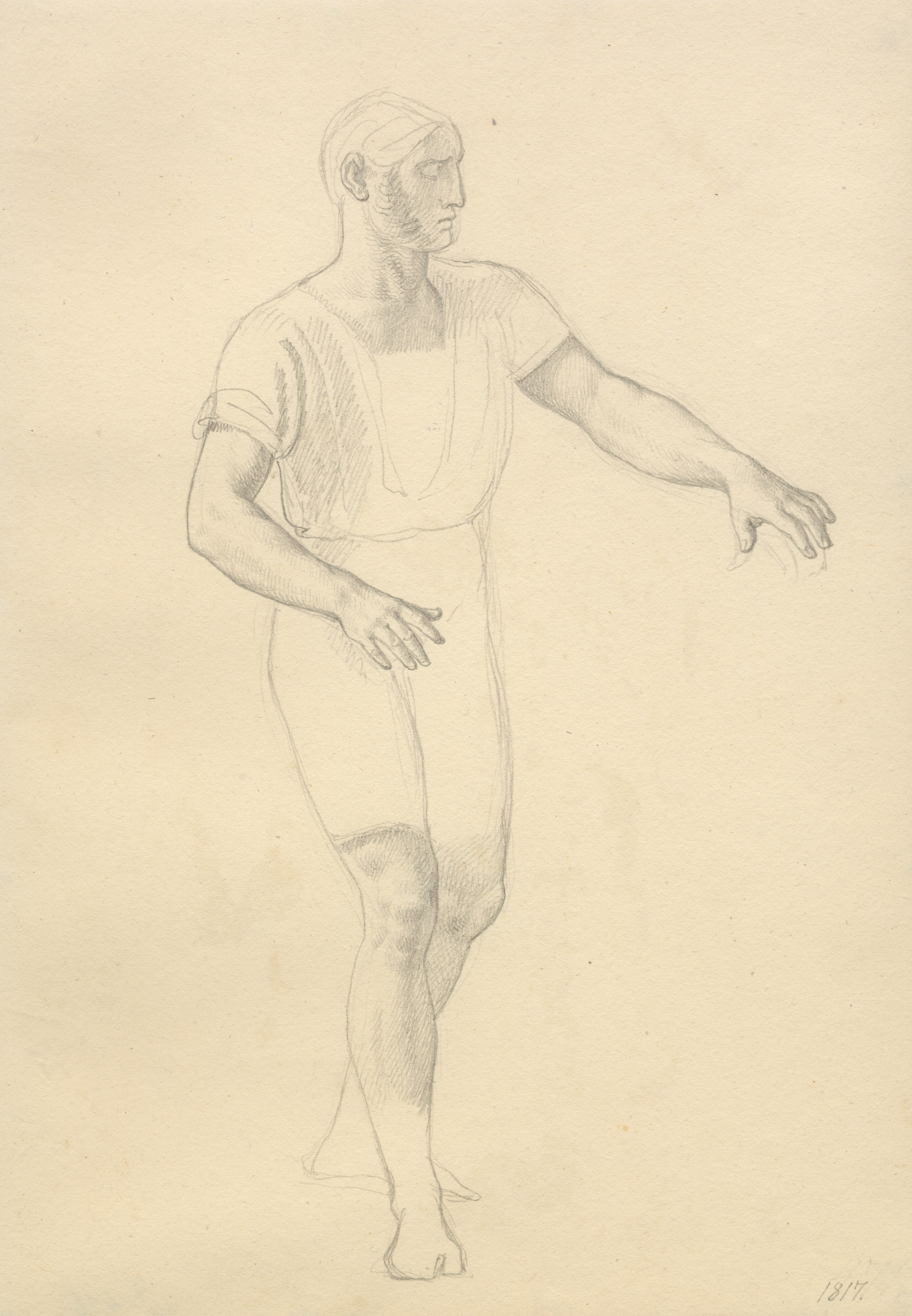
Sketch for the portray of Hødur

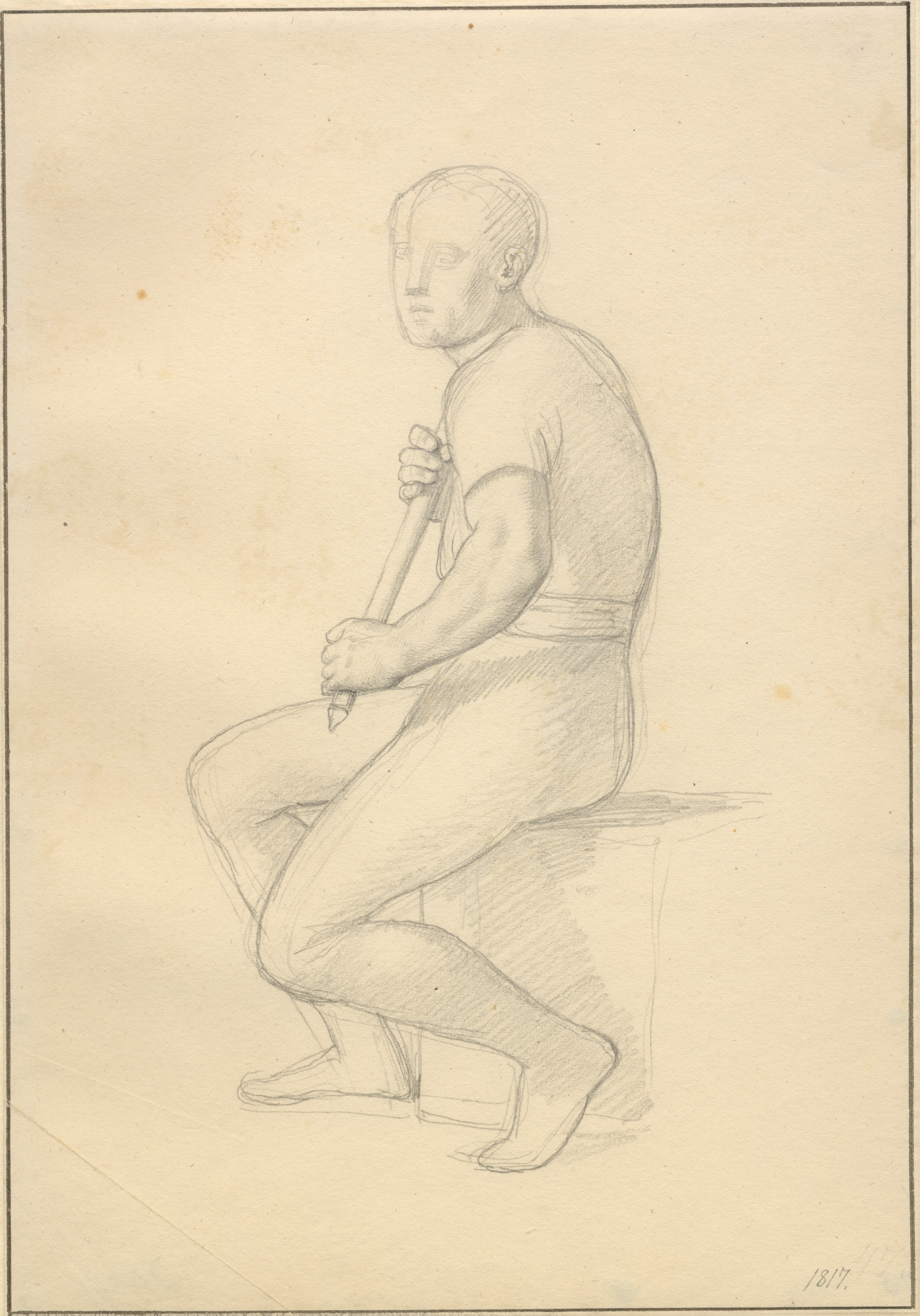
Sketch for the portrait of Thor
