= Caspar Peter Bügel =

Danish merchant and landowner

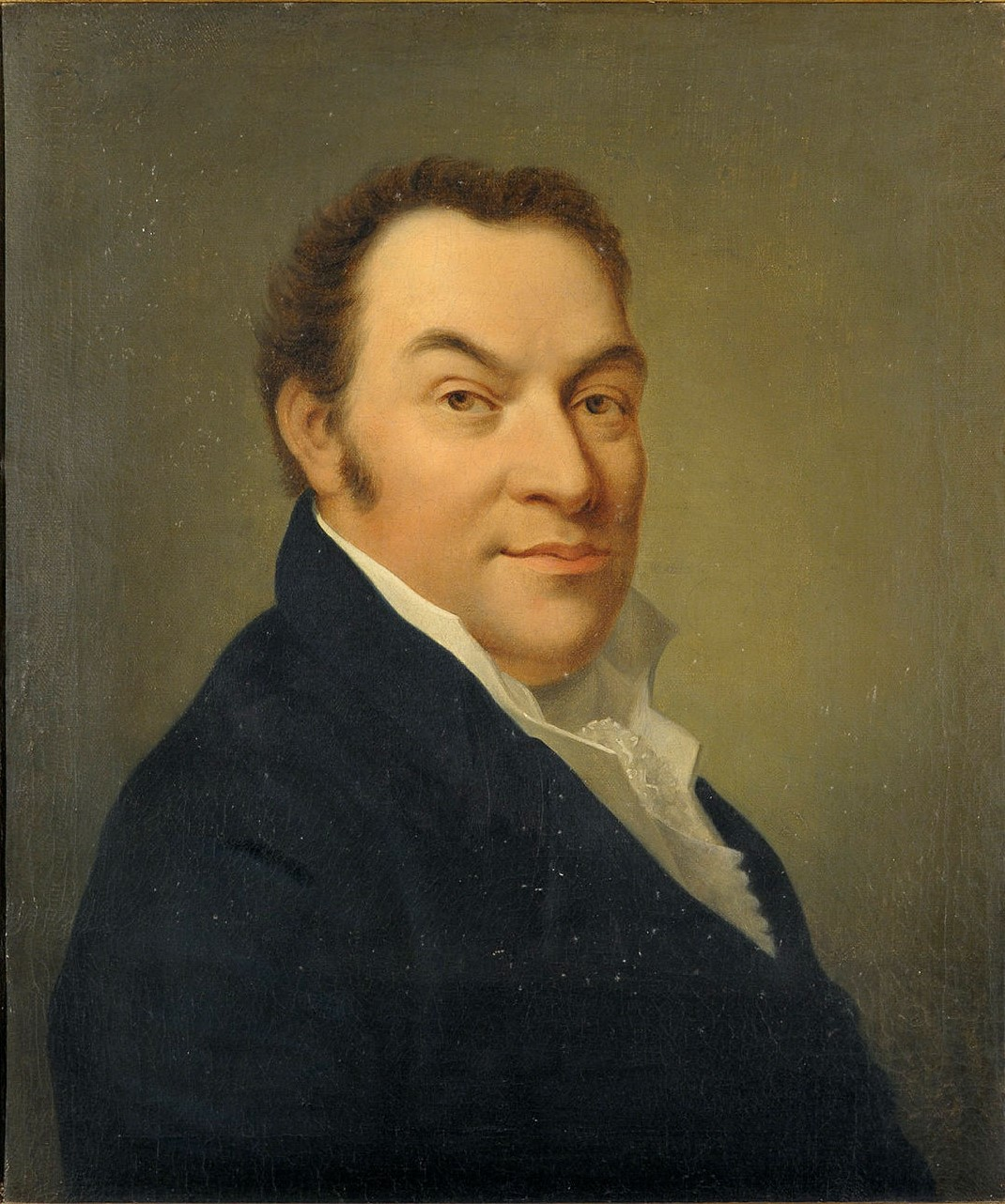
- Portrait by C. A. Lorentzen
- Born: 4 March 1759; Hamburg, Holy Roman Empire
- Died: 1 September 1817 (aged 58); Copenhagen, Denmark
- Occupations: Industrialist, merchant, ship owner, ship builder
- Awards: Grand Cross of the Dannebrog

Caspar Peter Bügel (4 March 1759 – 1 September 1817) was a Danish merchant and landowner. He owned Ringsted Abbey where a family mausoleum was inaugurated after his death. His wife Catharina Maria Bügel socialized with some of the leading figures of the Danish Golden Age after she became a widow in 1817.

== Early life and education ==
Bügel was born in Hamburg, the son of master carpenter Nicolaus Bügel (died 1783) and Anna Margarethe Bügel née Rickertsen or Richter (1721–82). He was probably trained as a merchant both in Hamburg and in Copenhagen.

== Career ==
He was licensed as a merchant in 1783. By this time he had already become a stakeholder in several merchant ships and over the years his trading house became one of the largest in the city. In 1798 he send six merchant ships off to the Mediterranean Sea as well as a few to East Asia, Danish West Indies, South America and the Baltic Sea.

== Property ==
His company, Bügel & C., was initially located on Amagertorv, then in Bag Børsen. and from the mid-1790s in Nybrogade.

In the mid-1790s, Bügel purchased the country house Bonne Esperance at Charlottenlund. He later purchased Det Knuthske Hotel in Frederiksholms Kanal which had a large garden to the rear of the building. He acquired Ringsted Abbey for 330,000 Danish rigsdaler in 1809.

== Personal life ==
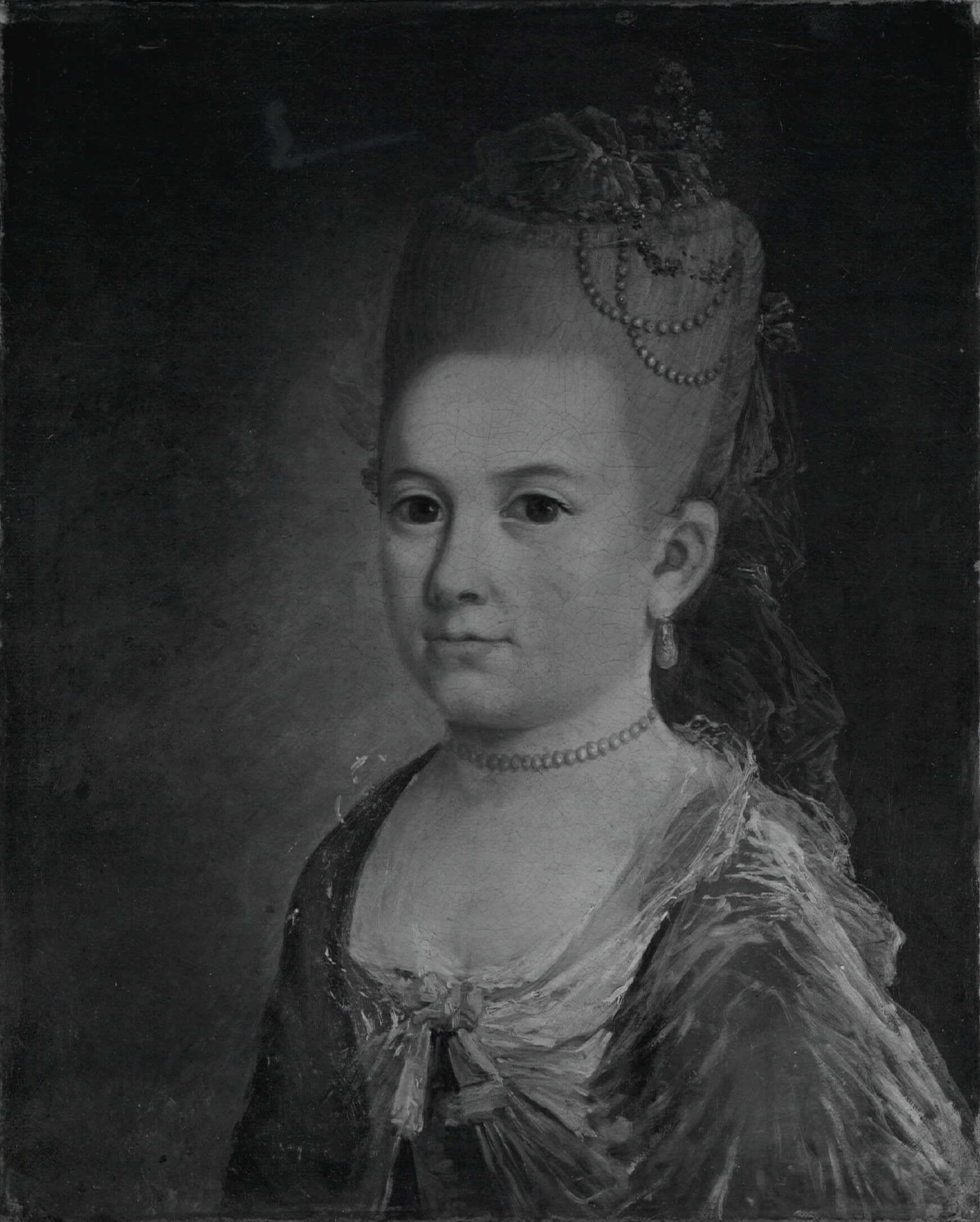
Catharina Maria Bügel née Adsen.

On 21 February 1787, Bügel married Catharina Maria Adzer (29 October 1767 – 25 January 1845) in St. Peter's Church in Copenhagen. She was the daughter and only child of royal medallist Daniel Adzer. They had six children.

Bügel retired in 1813. He took no part in public life and showed no interest in titles nor orders. He was on a good foot with the new French diplomatic delegation who called him as"Papa Bügel". He died in 1817 and is buried at St. Peter's Church.

After her husband's death, Catharina Maria Adzer took their four daughters on a journey in Europe that lasted from1817-1819. She arrived in Rome on 18 November 1818. She became a popular member of the Danish-Norwegian community. She made friends with Bertel Thorvaldsen and her home in Rome was often the site of social gatherings. Back in Denmark, she socialized with prominent cultural figures such as Christoph Ernst Friedrich Weyse, Hans Christian Andersen, Herman Freund, Bertel Thorvaldsen and Bernhard Severin Ingemann.
