= HDMS Indfødsretten (1786) =

Coordinates: 55.7314°N 12.6772°E

History
- Name: Indfødsretten
- Namesake: Danish Citizenship Act of 1776
- Builder: Henrik Gerner, Nyholm, Copenhagen
- Laid down: 27 April 1786
- Launched: 1786
- Captured: by British Royal Navy, 2 April 1801
- Fate: Burnt April 1801

General characteristics
- Type: Ship of the line
- Tons burthen: 1,016 tons
- Length: 158 ft (48 m)
- Beam: 43 ft (13 m)
- Draught: 18 ft (5.5 m)
- Sail plan: Full-rigged ship
- Complement: 559
- Armament: 26 × 24-pounder guns; 26 × 12-pounder guns; 12 × 8-pounder guns

Indfødsretten (Danish, lit. Citizenship) was a 64-gun ship of the line in the Royal Dano-Norwegian Navy commissioned in 1787. She was one of a class of five ships designed and constructed by naval architect Henrik Gerner. (Note: The earlier ship of this name, Indfødsretten (1775), disappeared in the Atlantic in 1783)

== Construction and design ==
Indfødsretten was constructed at Nyholm to a design by naval architect Henrik Gerner. She was laid down on 27 June 1784, launched on 27 April 1786 and the construction was completed on 12 October 1787.

== Career ==
During the Battle of Copenhagen on 2 April 1801, this blockship was commanded by Captain A. de Thurah with a complement of 394 sailors. The ship suffered heavy casualties in the battle; 21 were killed and 41 wounded. The ship struck her colours at 15.00. After her capture, Indfødsretten was burnt, along with all the other captured Danish warships except Holsteen.

== See also ==
- List of ships captured in the 19th century
