= Henrik Gerner =

Danish naval officer

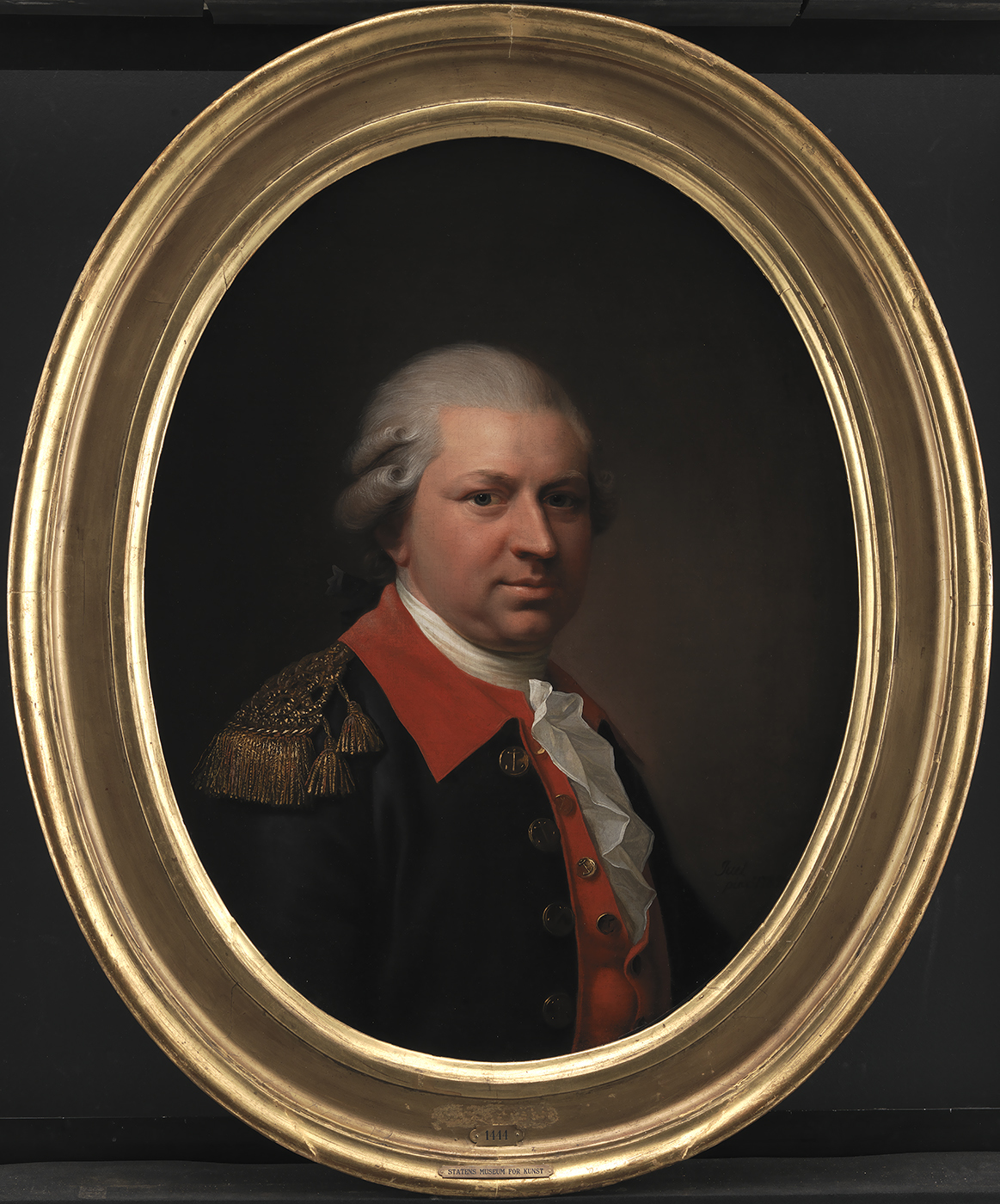
Portrait by Jens Juel, 1785

Henrik Gerner (1742–1787) was a Danish naval officer who specialised in shipbuilding and naval architecture. His interests as an entrepreneurial engineer led to unsinkable gun platforms, horse-driven dredging machines, and desalination equipment for Orient-bound trading ships.

== Early life and naval career ==
The greatgrandson of the bishop of the same name, Henrik Gerner was born on 5 July 1742 in Copenhagen and baptised in Holmen Church (Note: This same reference notes that the epitaph and gravestone have misreported his year of birth.) and married in the same church on Christmas Eve 1773, Henrik Gerner became a volunteer cadet at the naval academy in 1755, sailing to the West Indies in the frigate Christianborg before becoming a full cadet the next year.

Gerner graduated from the Naval Cadet Academy in Copenhagen as a junior lieutenant in 1763, where he was already interested in the art and science of shipbuilding, and in 1764 sailed with the frigate Falster to Russia and Sweden, receiving expenses for the studies of ships, ships' carpentry, and the ironworkings for anchors and cannon. In 1765 he was promoted to senior lieutenant and joined Prins Friderich in 1766.

He was a close colleague of Ernst Wilhelm Stibolt and they obtained junior positions in the Construction Commission (Note: The Construction Commission, first formed in 1739, had a remit to examine all technical drawings and associated documents of the fleet's ships., and to act as forum for the development of young naval officers, thus ensuring a certain continuity and training for future chief designers.(orlogbasen)) They were in England together studying ship building from 1768, and promotion for Gerner to Kaptain Lieutenant came in 1770. After a shorter spell in France, continuing his studies, Gerner was recalled to Denmark in 1772 and given the post of fabrikmester at Holmen and full membership of the Construction Commission. After further promotion he became a member, in 1776, of the Commission on Naval Defence and that same year was instrumental in founding the Ship Construction School.

== Ship building ==
Some 117 ships of a variety of types and sizes are recorded (Note: To access the list click orlogbasen then>database>AVANCEREDE> set Konstruktør to Henrik Gerner >Søg!) as designed and built by Gerner, including 18 ships-of-the-line and 11 frigates.

Ships of the line

- Prindsesse Sophia Frederica (1775)
- Indfødsretten (1776)
- Justitia (1777), captured by the British at the Battle of Copenhagen (1807)
- Oldenborg (1779)
- Ditmarsken (1780), captured by the British at the Battle of Copenhagen (1807)
- Arveprinds Friderich (1780)
- Prindsesse Lovisa Augusta /1782)
- Kronprinds Frederik (1784), captured by the British at the Battle of Copenhagen (1807)
- Mars (1784), captured by the British at the Battle of Copenhagen (1807)
- Nordstjernen (1785)
- Indfødsretten (1786)
- Fyen (1787)
- Sjælland (1787)
- Odin (1788)
- Neptunus (1789), captured by the British at the Battle of Copenhagen (1807)
- Tre Kroner (1789), captured by the British at the Battle of Copenhagen (1807)
- Skiold, captured by the British at the Battle of Copenhagen (1807)

Frigates

- Bornholm (1774)
- Kiel (1775)
- Møen (1777)
- Disco /1778)
- St, Thomas (1779)
- Cronborg (1781)
- Det Store Bælt (1782), sold to the Danish Asiatic Company in 1800.
- Friderichsværn (1783), captured August 1807 before the Battle of Copenhagen. See Gunboat War
- HDMS Hvide Ørn (1784) (1784)
- Pommern (1785)

MNerchant ships

- Æolus (1783)
- Den Gode Hensigt, was a merchant ship built for the East India trade, and chartered by British merchants.

== Defence works ==
- Floating Battery No.1, (1787), an unsinkable platform heavily armed with 24-pound cannon survived the Battle of Copenhagen (1801) but was decommissioned the following year.

== Other engineering achievements ==
- Dredging machine. In 1783 a novel machine for dredging the harbours and creeks excited public imagination. Prior to Gerner's new invention powered by horses, the clearing of mud and silt from the channels was a very labour-intensive project in order to allow ships to be hauled up and their bottoms scraped and cleaned.
- Desalination

== Commemoration ==
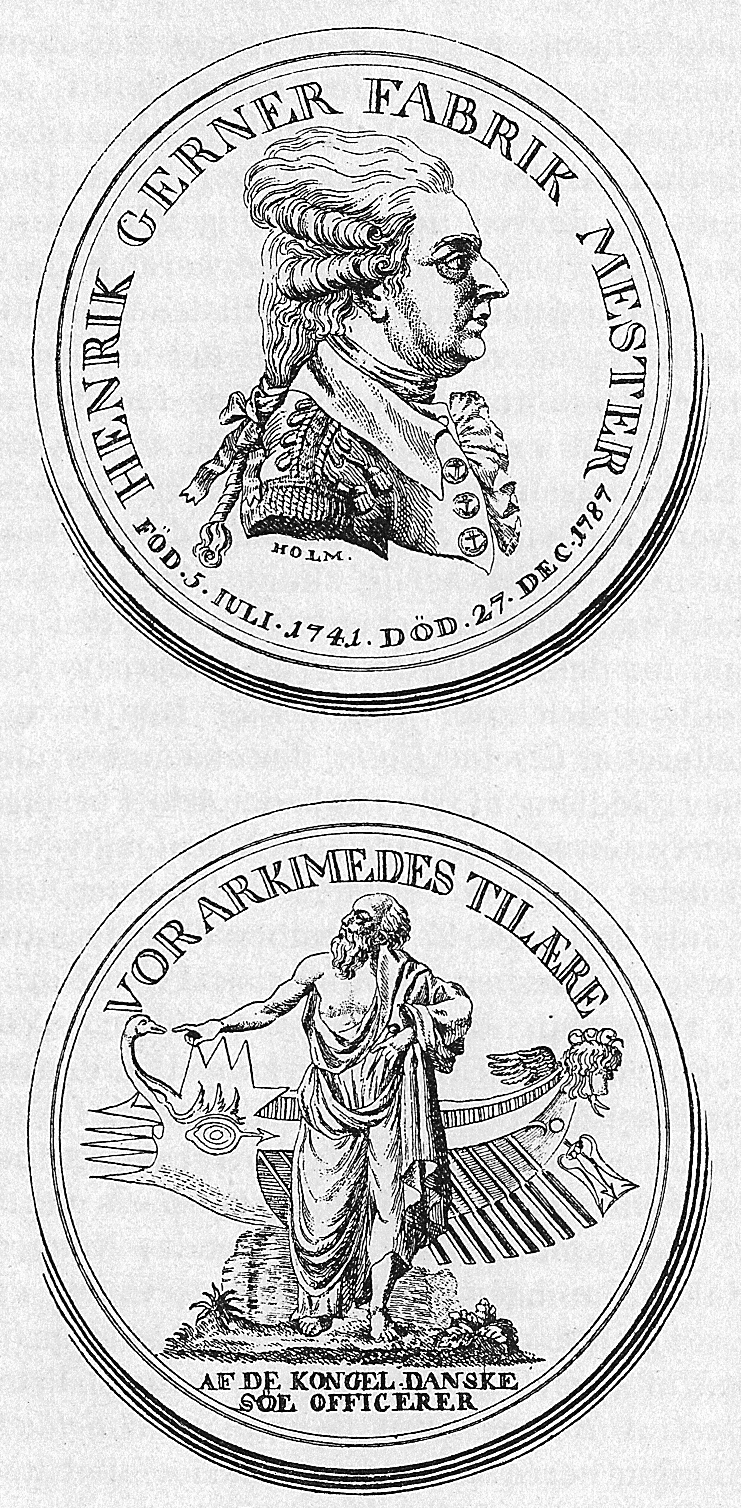
Henrik Gerner Medal

The Gerner Medal "for the naval cadet who showed the best insight and understanding of the science of seafaring, especially mathematics" was first presented in 1792. Its history was later associated with the sword of honour. Both honours are still available today - see da: Gerners Medalje. One hundred years after Henrik Gerner's death, a 72-page appreciation of his works and character was published in memoriam.

The street Gernersgade in Copenhagen was named for Gerner in 1869.Henrik Gerners Vej in Birkerød is on the other hand name for his great-grandfather.

Two ships of the twentieth century Danish navy have borne his name

- Submarine depot ship Henrik Gerner (1928–1943) scuttled, with another 31 vessels, in August 1943 in Copenhagen harbour to prevent being forcibly taken by German forces.
- Submarine depot ship Henrik Gerner (1964–1975)

== Gallery ==
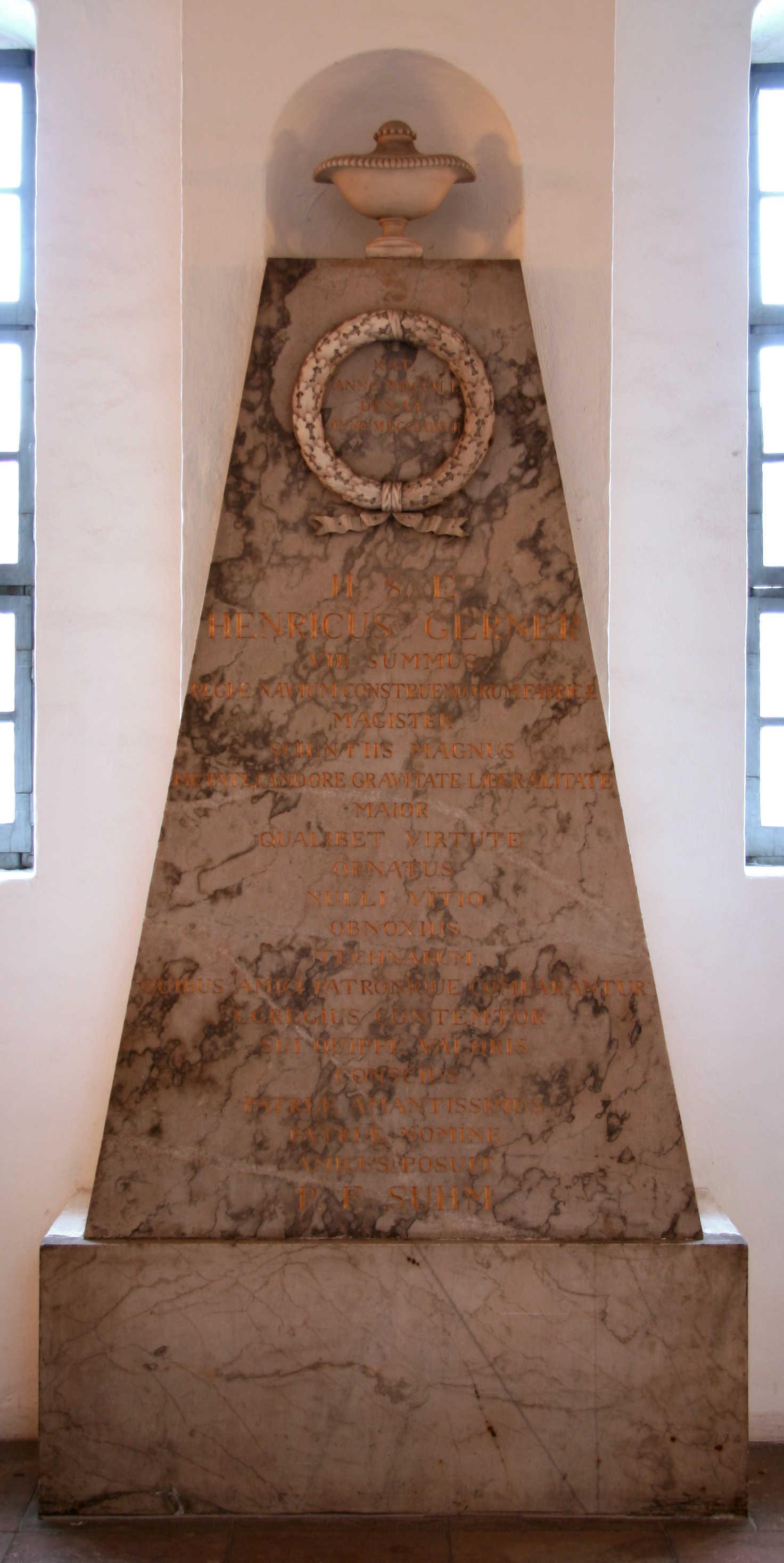
Epitaph in Holmen Church

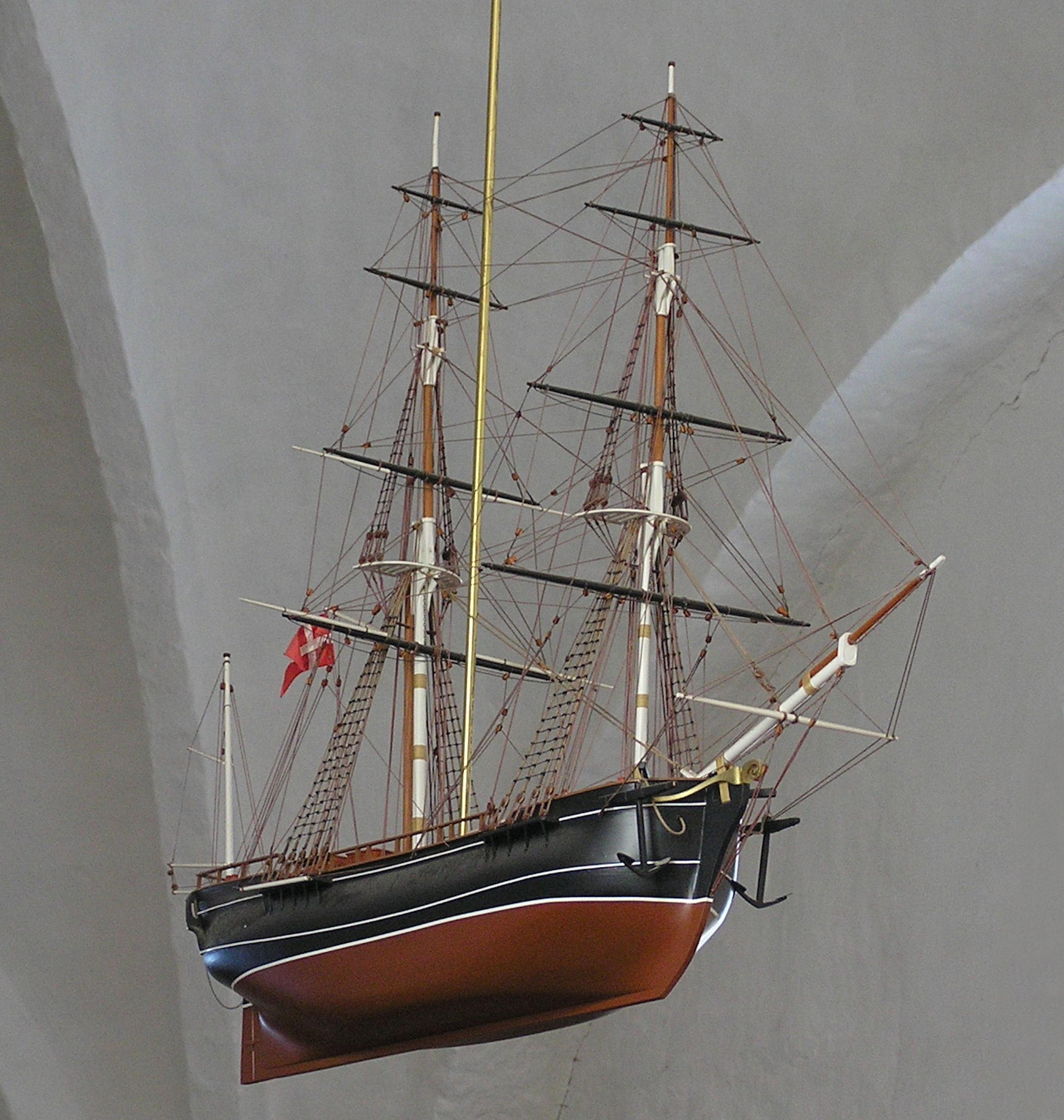
Model of the Gerner-designed ship Emigheden

== Bibliography and external links ==
- Balsved's Danish Naval History in Danish (more complete than the English version)
- (in Danish) Christensen, Benny: Den Gode Hensigt
- (in Danish) Giødesen Mindeskrift om Henrik Gerner, Flaadens Fabrikmester by P. F. Giødesen, commander of the Naval Lieutenants Association
- Royal Danish Naval Museum in English
- (in Danish) Royal Danish Naval Museum
- (in Danish) Project Runeberg Both Gerners appear on the same page!
- (in Danish) T. A. Topsøe-Jensen og Emil Marquard (1935) “Officerer i den dansk-norske Søetat 1660-1814 og den danske Søetat 1814-1932“.
