= HDMS Indfødsretten (1776) =

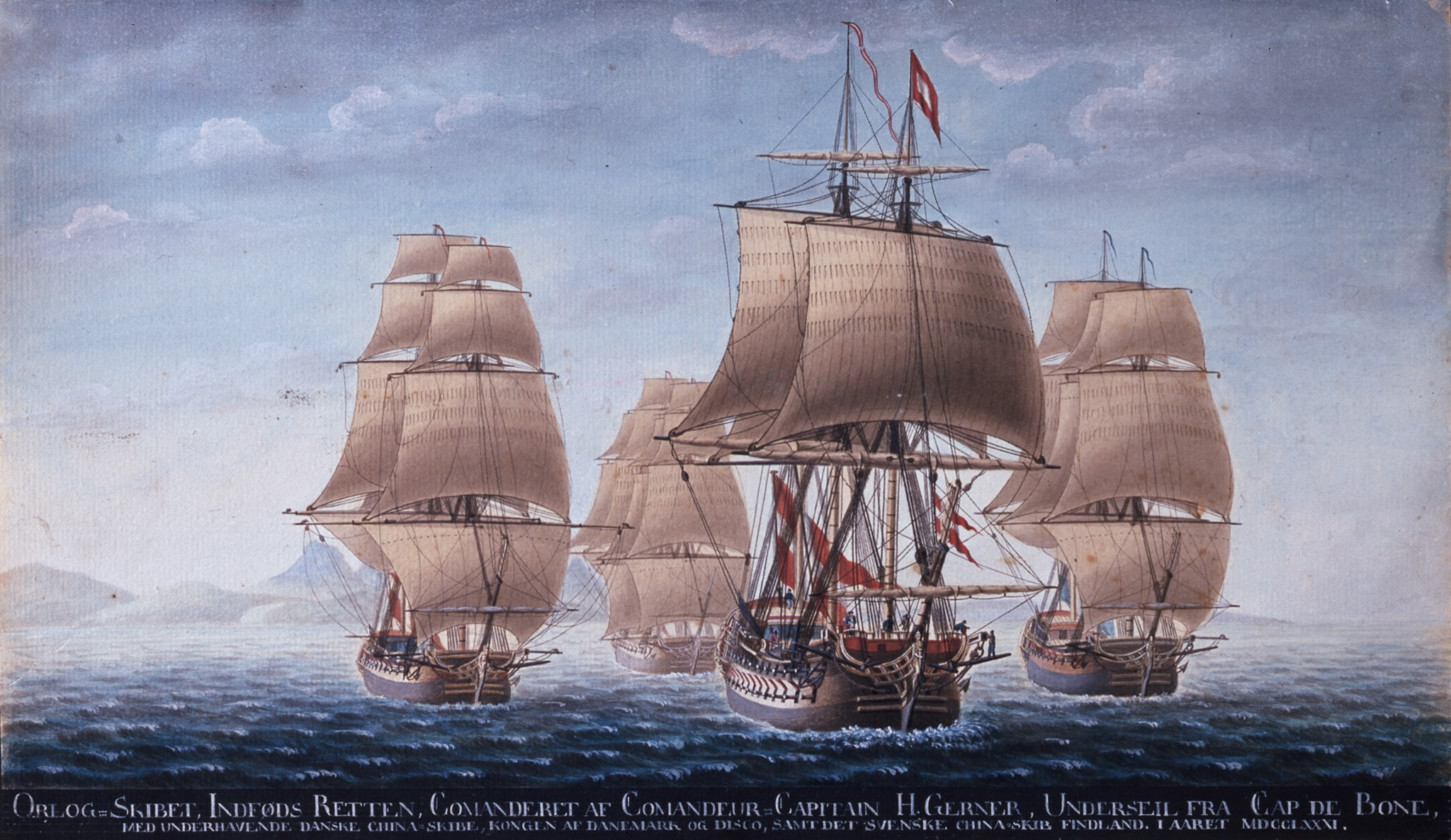
- Indfødsretten flanked by the frigates Kongens af Danmark and Disklo and with the Swedish frigate Finland in the background, 1781.

History
- Name: Indfødsretten
- Namesake: Danish Citizenship Act of 1776
- Builder: Henrik Gerner, Nyholm, Copenhagen
- Laid down: 18 December 1779
- Launched: 25 November 1780
- Fate: Sank in 1783

General characteristics
- Type: Ship of the line
- Length: 158 ft (48 m)
- Beam: 43 ft (13 m)
- Sail plan: Full-rigged ship
- Complement: 559
- Armament: 64 guns

HDMS Indfødsretten (lit. Citizenship) was a ship of the line of the Royal Dano-Norwegian Navy, launched in 1776. She sank in an unknown location in the Atlantic Ocean on her way back from Tranquebar in 1783.

== Construction and design ==
Indfødsretten was constructed at Nyholm Dockyard to a design by Henrik Gerner. She was laid down on 25 March 1775, launched on 11 May 1776 and the construction was completed in 1778.

She was 158 ft (48 m) with a beam of 43 ft (13 m) and a draught of 18 ft (5.5 m). Her complement was 559 men and her armament was 60 24-pounder guns.

== Career ==
In 1781, together with Kongens af Danmark and Diskom she was used for escorting Danish Chinamen and Eastindiamen.

On 9 June 1782, she sailed from Copenhagen, bound for Cape Town and Tranquebar. She arrived at Tranquebar on 10 January 1783. She departed from Tranquebar in February, reaching Cape Town in June. She departed from Cape Town on 23 June 1783, bound for Copenhagen. She sank on the way back in an unknown location somewhere in the Atlantic Ocean. A barkasse and a yard from the ship stranded on the south coast of Iceland.
