= 1684 in Denmark =

- Decades: 1660s; 1670s; 1680s; 1690s; 1700s
- See also: Other events of 1684; List of years in Denmark

Events from the year 1684 in Denmark.

== Incumbents ==
- Monarch – Christian V
- Grand Chancellor – Frederik Ahlefeldt

== Births ==
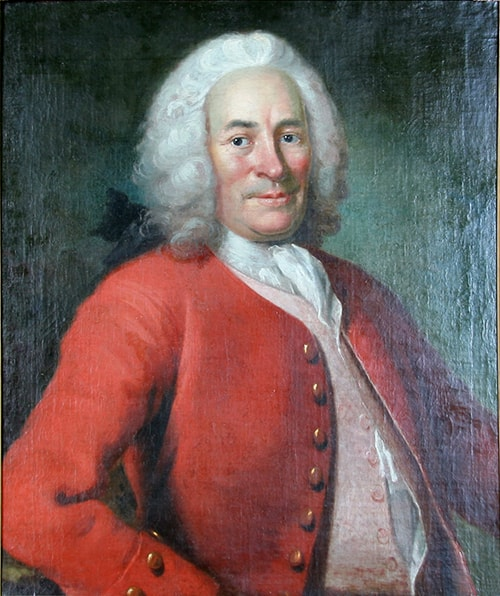
Erik Torm

- 23 January – Christian Rantzau, Governor-general of Norway (died 1771)
- 26 July – Peder Benzon, Supreme Court justice and landowner (died 1735)
- 11 September – Erik Torm, burgermaster and chief of police in Copenhagen (died 1764)
- 30 November – Andreas Møller, portrait painter (died after 1755)

== Deaths ==
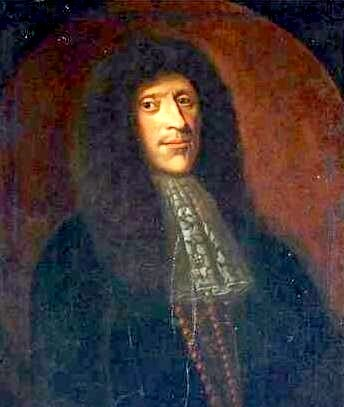
Gans Rostgaard

- 9 February – Otto Pogwisch, government official (born c. 1610)
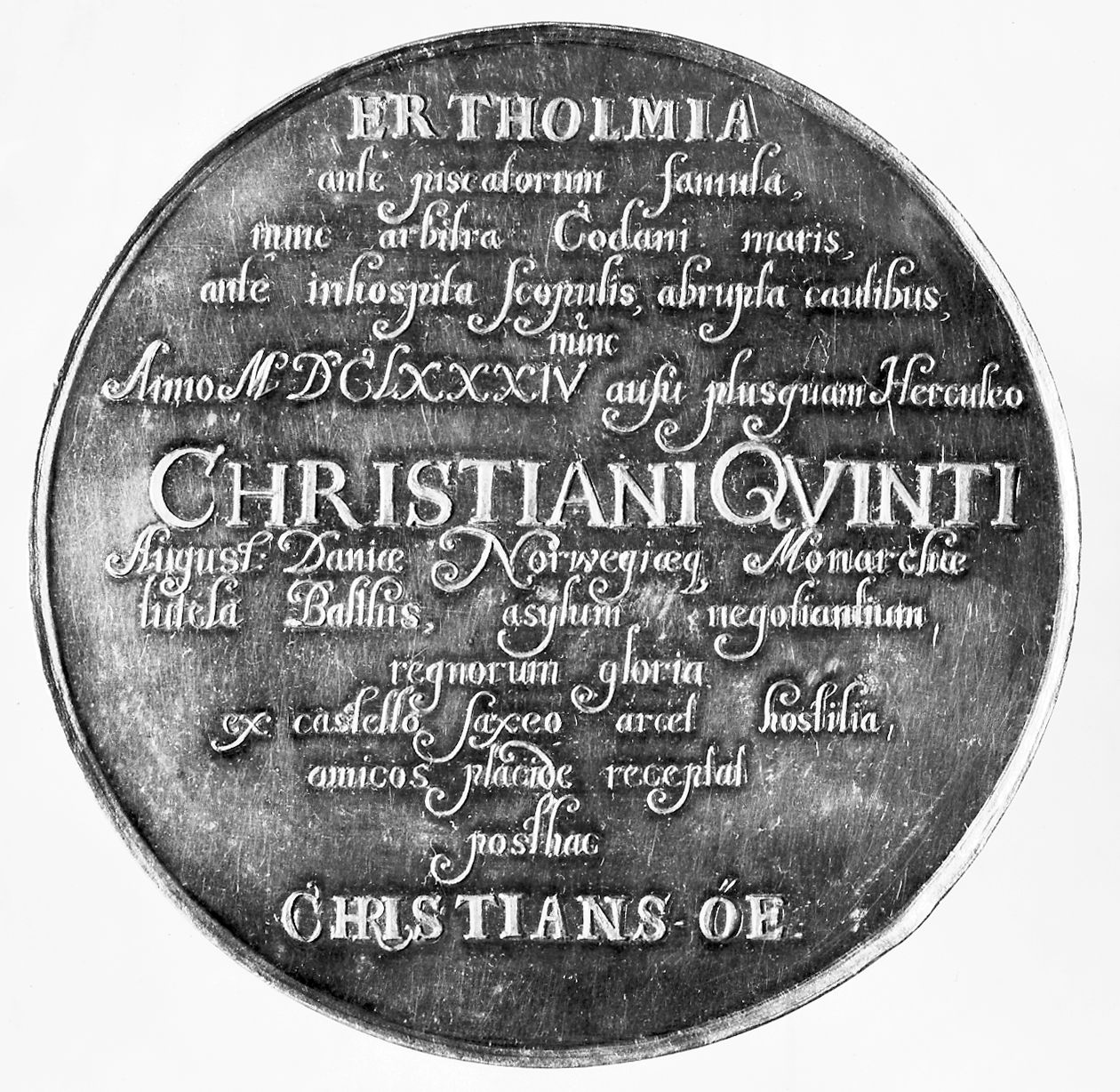
  Medal commemorating the fortification of Christiansø, 1684.
- 18 April – Nikolaj Nissen, judge and landowner (born 1627)
- 31 December – Hans Rostgaard, administrator (born 1625)
