= Frederik Horn =

Danish police chief and judge

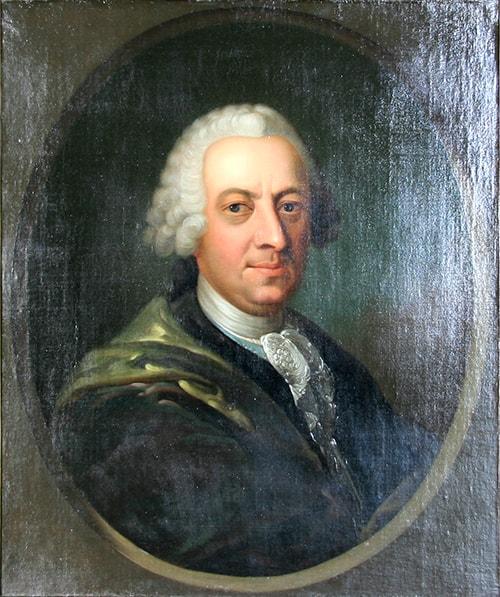
- Portrait of Horn in Copenhagen Police Headquarters.

Chief of Copenhagen Police Force
- In office 1764–1771
- Monarchs: Frederick V, Christian VII
- Preceded by: Erik Torm
- Succeeded by: Vilhelm Bornemann
- Constituency: Copenhagen Police Force

Personal details
- Born: 7 January 1708 Nykøbing Galster, Denmark-Norway
- Died: 25 May 1781 (aged 73) Copenhagen, Denmark
- Occupation: Chief of police, President of Hof- og Stadsretten

Frederik Horn (7 January 1708 – 25 May 1781) was a Danish jurist who served as president of Hof- og Stadsretten as well as chief of police in Copenhagen. Earlier in his life, he had aspirations to become a writer.

== Early life and education ==
Horn was born on 7 January 1708 in Nykøbing, Falster, the son of customs official Lars Nielsen Horn (c. 1660–1735) and Margrethe Simonsdatter (c. 1666–1728). He matriculated from Nykøbing Latin School in 1829. He went on to study law at the University of Copenhagen but never earned a degree. For a while he worked as a tutor for different families, for instance in Tønsberg in 1734.

== Career ==
In 1735 Horn was licensed as a barrister (overretsprokurator) in spite of not having completed his studies. In 1737, he published Meditationer over Procuratorprofessionen (lit. 'Thoughts on the Lawyer Profession'). In 1739, he was licensed as a Supreme Court attorney.

In 1751, Horn became an assistant for his father-in-law, Copenhagen's chief of police. On the father-in-law's death in 1764, he became his successor in the office. At the same time, he was appointed as one of the city's burgermasters. From 1766, he concurrently served as Director of Copenhagen's Poor Authority (Fattigvæsenet). In Dorothea Biehl's memoirs, she describes how Horn had to have Frederick V's mistresses removed from the city to prevent scandal. He also had to intervene when C. C. Danneskiold-Laurvig abducted Mette Marie Rose from the Royal Danish Theatre. Christian VII caused him even more problems than his successor.

In 1771, Struense had Horn replaced by Vilhelm Bornemann. Horn was instead appointed as the first president of the new Hof- og Stadsretten.

From 1750 to 1754 and again from 1762, he also served as one of the directors of the Royal Danish Theatre. In the pamphlet Sinceri Giensvar paa Hypocritæ Skrivelse imod Comoediegang (1754), he defended the theatre against fierce criticism from pietistic circles.

== Literary works ==
Early in his life, Horn had aspirations to become an author. He was a great admirer of Ludvig Holberg to the extent that he was nicknamed "Hans Mikkelsen's Abe" ("Hans Mikkelsen's Monkey"; Holberg had used the pseudonym Hans Mikkelsen). In 1731, he published two satirical works, Poesiens Misbrug and Somnium poëticum, both of them under the pseudonym "Frans Hansen, Dreyer in Helsingør".

== Personal life ==
On 23 December 1738, Horn married Jeanne Antoinette Greben (Greve; died, 1742). She was a daughter of wigmaker Johan Christopher Greben (c. 1692–1750) and Clara Margrethe Jæger (c. 1685–1751). On 8 July 1744, he married secondly to Mette Sophie Torm (1722–1791). She was a daughter of Erik Torm (1684–1764) and Anna K. Ravn (c. 1692–1734).

His first wife bore him 11 children, of which at least five survived to adulthood. The daughter Antoinette Frederikke Horn (1731–1773) was married to the lawyer Oluf Lundt de Bang (1731–1789). He was the half-brother of the medical doctor Frederik Ludvig Bang.

== Awards ==
Horn was appointed justitsråd in 1761, etatsråd in 1768 and konferensråd in 1776.
