= 1682 in Denmark =

- Decades: 1660s; 1670s; 1680s; 1690s; 1700s
- See also: Other events of 1682; List of years in Denmark

Events from the year 1682 in Denmark.

== Incumbents ==
- Monarch – Christian V
- Grand Chancellor – Frederik Ahlefeldt

== Events ==
- The French theater company La troupe du Roi de Danemark is opened as the theater of the royal court and the first and only permanent theater in Denmark for forty years onward.

== Births ==
- 13 September – Jacob Kærup, theologian (died 1751)
- Unknown date – Zacharias Allewelt, sea captain (died 1744)

== Deaths ==
- 8 February – Robert Robartes, Viscount Bodmin, British ambassador to Denmark (b. 1634)
- 21 May – Reinhold von Hoven, military officer (b. c. 1610)
- 23 May – Abraham Wuchters, painter and engraver (b. 1608)
