= 1681 in Denmark =

- Decades: 1660s; 1670s; 1680s; 1690s; 1700s
- See also: Other events of 1681; List of years in Denmark

Events from the year 1681 in Denmark.

== Incumbents ==
- Monarch – Christian V
- Grand Chancellor – Frederik Ahlefeldt

== Events ==
- April –The pastor Jacob Worm who is a prisoner at Copenhagen Fortress, is sentenced to death for his satirical poems directed at the king, Thomas Kingo (his father-in-law) and others, but is pardoned and instead send to Tranquebar in exile.
- 16 April – A royal decree orders the execution of a new cadastral survey. Christian V's Cadastre is completed in 1688.
- 25 June – A royal decree provides for the first street lighting in Copenhagen. 500 street lights using whale oil are installed but are not to be lit on light summer nights or when the moon is out.
- 29 June – King Christian V travels from Copenhagen to Kolding in just one day, leaving at 03:00 and arriving Kolding at 22:00.

=== Undated ===
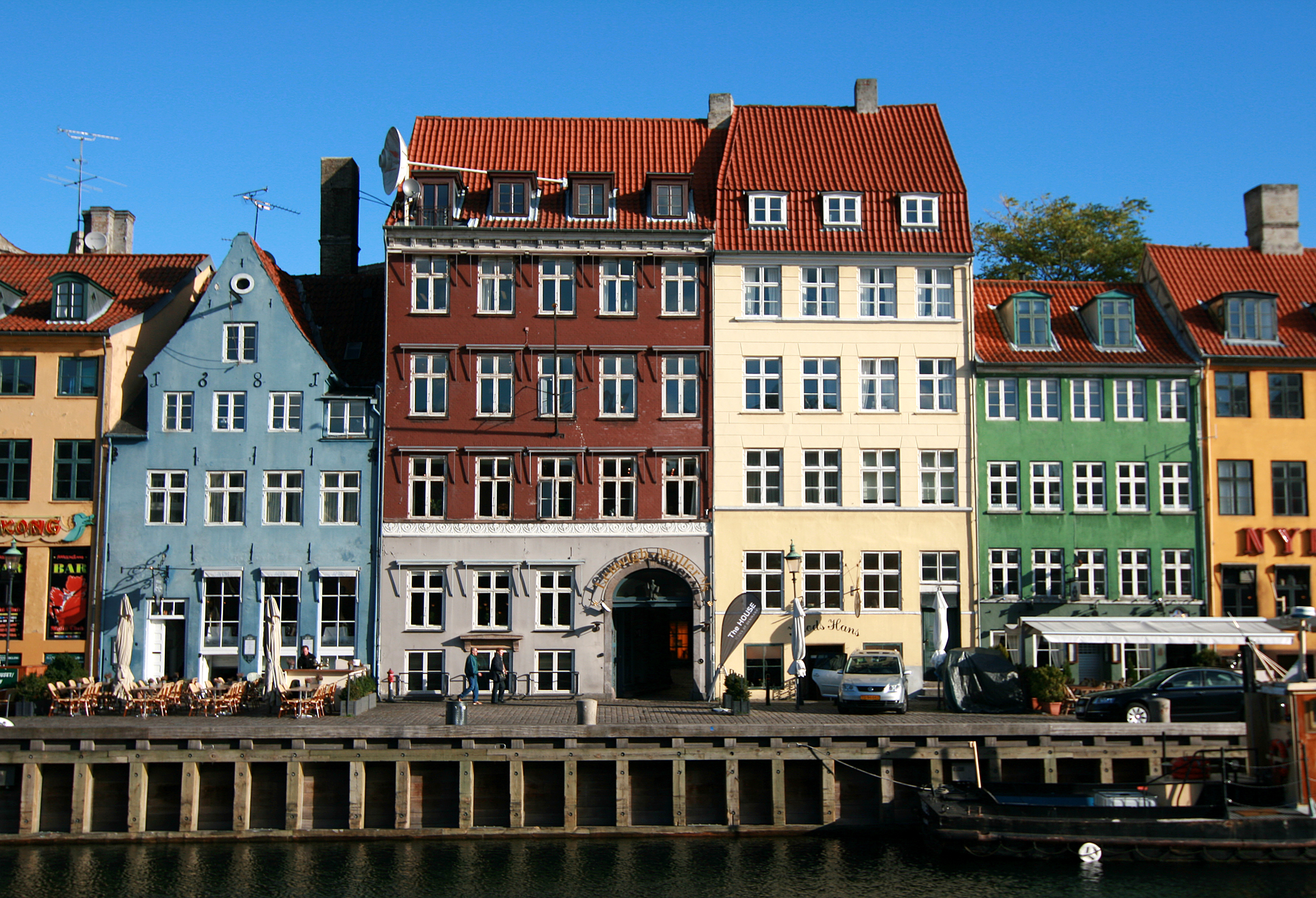
Nyhavn 9–15, Copenhagen probably by Christen Christensen (1681)

- Ole Rømer returns to Denmark from Paris and is appointed as a professor at University of Copenhagen.
- Robert Robartes, Viscount Bodmin is the English ambassador to Denmark.
- An attempt to construct a dry dock in Copenhagen fails as it continues to take on water. A new dry dock is not completed until 1739 at Christianshavn.
- The oldest house at Nyhavn in Copenhagen is built.
- Frederiksholm Canal is dug out and Storm Bridge is built in Copenhagen.
- The Barony of Høegholm is established by Christian V from Fævejle and Lykkesholm as well as other land in the area.

== Births ==
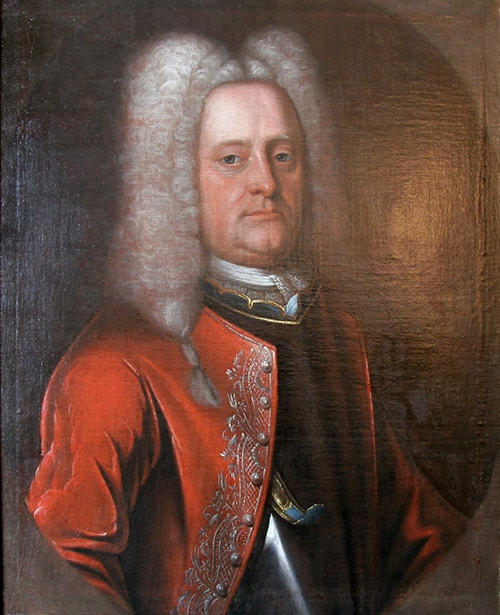
Hans Himmerich.

- 16 August – Caspar Martin Schøller, county governor (died 1756)
- 5 August – Vitus Bering, explorer (died 1741 in Imperial Russia)
- 19 December – Hans Himmerich, chief of police (died 1735)

=== Undated ===
- Niels Dorph, bishop (died 1758)

== Deaths ==
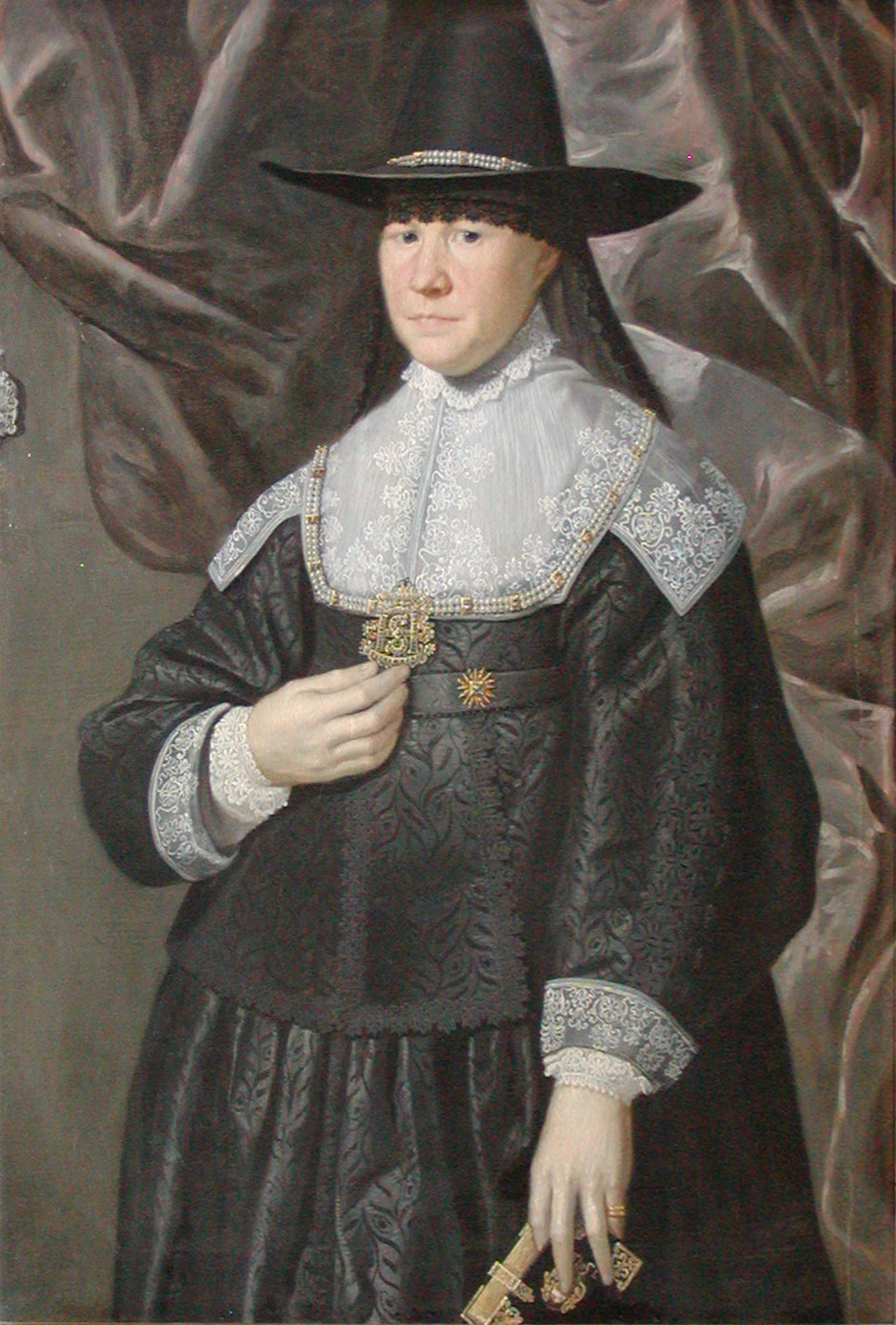
Anne Gøye.

- 3 January – Cornelius Pedersen Lerche, nobleman (born 1615)
- 9 January – Anne Gøye, noblewoman and book collector (born 1609)
- 13 May – Markor Rodsteen, admiral (born 1625)
