= 1679 in Denmark =

- Decades: 1650s; 1660s; 1670s; 1680s; 1690s
- See also: Other events of 1679; List of years in Denmark

Events from the year 1679 in Denmark.

== Incumbents ==
- Monarch – Christian V
- Grand Chancellor – Frederik Ahlefeldt

== Events ==
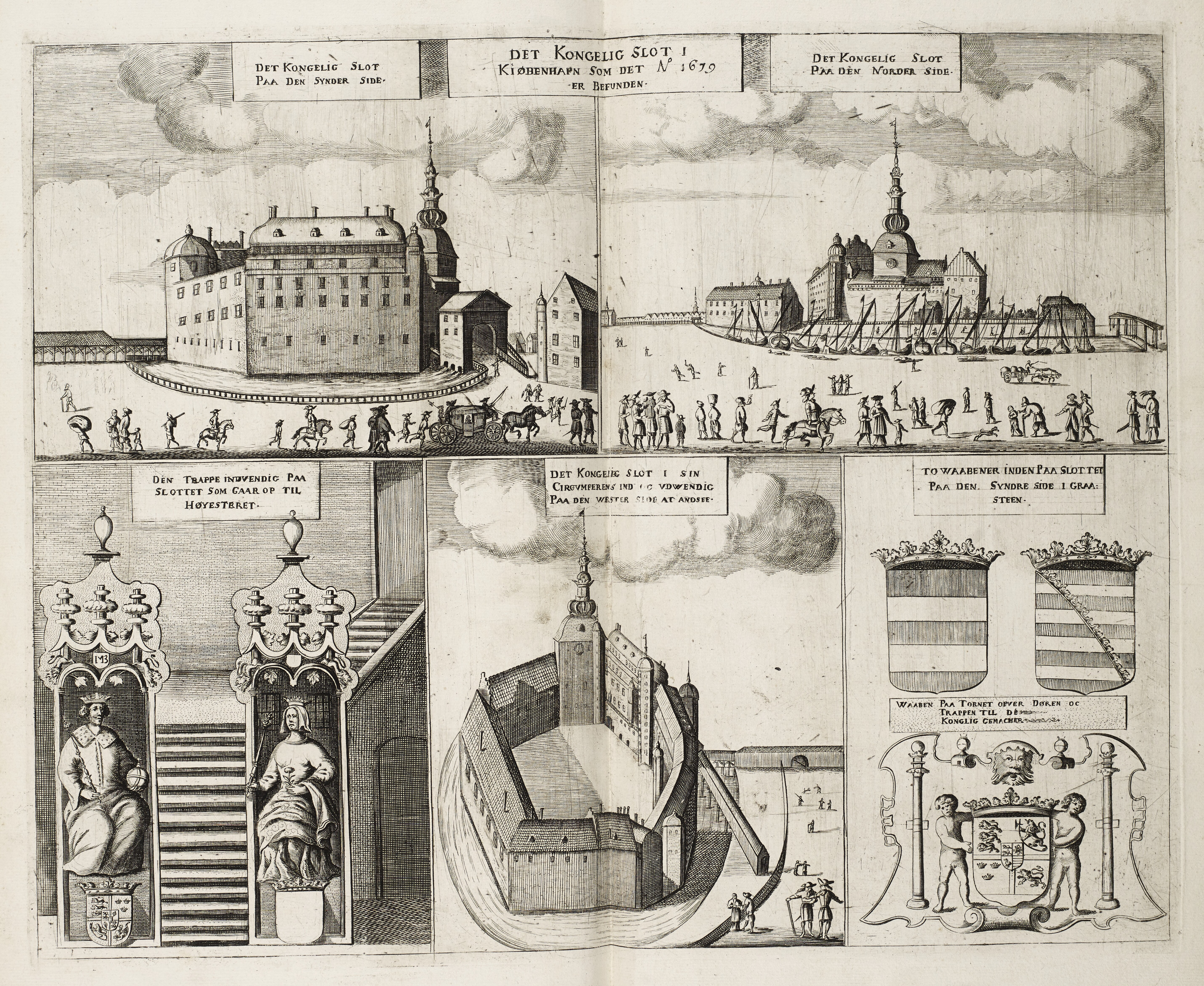
Copenhagen Castle in 1679.

- 2 September – The Treaty of Fontainebleau ends hostilities between Denmark-Norway and the Swedish Empire in the Scanian War. Denmark, pressured by France, restores all conquests made during the war to Sweden in turn for a "paltry indemnity".
- 26 September – The Peace of Lund end the Scanian War.

== Births ==
- 14 May – Peder Horrebow, astronomer (died 1764)
- 10 November – Christian Carl Gabel, vice admiral, Chief Secretary of War and Director of the Dano-Norwegian Navy and Holmen Naval Base (died 1748)

=== Full date unknown ===
- Jacob Fosie, painter (died 1763)

== Deaths ==
- 29 June – Christopher Heerfordt, pharmacist and botanist (born 1609)
- 16 September – Søren Nielsen May, priest (born (year of birth unknown)
- 28 December – Peder Winstrup, clergy (born 1605)

=== Full date unknown ===
- Christoffer Godskesen Lindenov, naval officer and landowner (born 1612)
