= 1678 in Denmark =

- Decades: 1650s; 1660s; 1670s; 1680s; 1690s
- See also: Other events of 1678; List of years in Denmark

Events from the year 1678 in Denmark.

== Incumbents ==
- Monarch – Christian V
- Grand Chancellor – Frederik Ahlefeldt

== Events ==
=== Scanian War ===
- 18 January – Battle of Warksow, the Swedish navy defeats the forces of Denmark-Norway and Brandenburg-Prussia.
- 22–24 September – Invasion of Rügen, the allied forces of Denmark-Norway and Brandenburg-Prussia occupy Rügen.

== Births ==
- 24 June – Ulrik Christian Gyldenløve, Count of Samsø, admiral and illegitimate son of Christian V (died 1719)
- 30 November – Gregorius Klauman, businessman and judge (died 1752)

== Deaths ==
- 5 October – Hedevig Ulfeldt, daughter of king Christian IV (born 1626)
