= La troupe du Roi de Danemark =

La troupe du Roi de Danemark, or Roi de Danemark for short, was a French-speaking Danish court theatre, active at the Royal Danish court from 1682 until 1721. It was the only permanent theater in Denmark during its tenure.

The first French theater troupe had performed at the royal Danish court under Jean Guilmois de Rosidor (father of Claude Guilmois de Rosidor) in 1669–70, but that was but a temporary visit. The Roi de Danemark was engaged 23 March 1682. It was composed of French artists, who performed French language plays exclusively for the royal Danish court on temporary stages arranged at the various royal palaces. The composition of the troupe varied, but normally consisted of circa twelve people. It was the only permanent theatre company in Denmark during its tenure, when the only other theater activity in Copenhagen consisted of temporary visits from travelling foreign theater company's. The troupe was given a purpose built theatre building in 1712.

In 1721, the French court theater was dissolved by the monarch, who preferred German opera. Some of the members of the former court theater, who had lived in Denmark for most of their lives and in some cases even been born there, did not wish to leave Denmark, and therefore founded the first permanent public theater in Copenhagen, Lille Grønnegade Theatre, in January 1722.

== Members ==
- Paul Belleville de Foy
- Claude Biet dit Hauteville
- Nicolas Bonneville
- Madame Bonneville
- Jean Bouillart dit La Garde, 1682–94
- Julien Bourdais dit Dorilly, 1686–94
- Mlle Jeanne Chambly, 1701 to 1717
- Mlle Rosette
- Marie-Madeleine-Armande de la Garde 1682-90
- Philippe Chaumont
- Mlle Marie-Madeleine-Ange Coirat dite Mlle de Belleroche, 1682–89
- M. Ange-François Corrare / Coirat dit Belleroche, 1682–95
- Charles Chevillet dit Champmeslé, 1682–85
- Nicolas Desmares,
- Jacques Du Buisson, 1701–21
- Nicolas Du Majot (ou Du Manjot), 1701–08
- Anne d'Ennebaut, 1682
- d'Erval
- Mlle Martine-Geneviève Giraut, 1694
- Laurent Guérin d'Estriché
- Jubert
- Jeanne-Françoise de Lan Bellefleur, 1692
- Marthe Le Charton, 1682
- Mlle Claude Loier, ép. Du Buisson, 1701
- Jean-Baptiste de Lorme dit Châteauvert, 1686
- Marie Madeleine de Montaigu, 1716-1721
- René Magnon dit Montaigu, 1686-1721
- Nicolas-Jean-Baptiste Morin dit de La Croix
- Jean de Nevers, 1682–94
- Jean de Nouvel, 1682
- Charles-Louis Pallai dit Versigny, 1682
- Françoise de Penhoet Nevers, 1682-1690
- Louis Perlis, 1704-1721
- Jean Poisson dit Poisson de Granville, 1706-1710
- Toinette Poitiers Hauteville, 1701-1704
- Mlle Rochemore, 1686
- Roudo, 1702
- François Toubel, 1703-1705
- Marie-Anne de Touchemarie Poisson de Granville, 1706-1710
- Verstang, 1686

== See also ==
- La troupe du Roi de Suede
