= Erik Torm =

Burgermaster and chief of police in Copenhagen

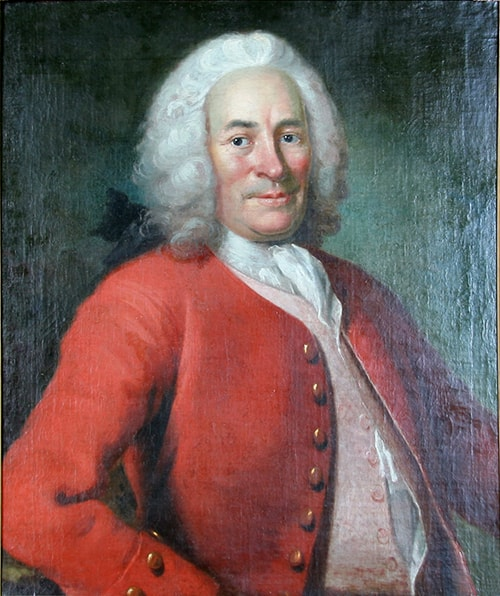
- Portrait of Erik Torm by Johan Hörner in Copenhagen Police Headquarters.

Chief of Copenhagen Police Force
- In office 1731–1761
- Monarch: Christian VI
- Preceded by: Hans Himmerich
- Succeeded by: Frederik Horn
- Constituency: Copenhagen Police Force

Personal details
- Born: 11 September 1684 Salling, Denmark
- Died: 23 February 1763 (aged 78) Copenhagen, Denmark
- Occupation: Burgermaster, chief of police
- Profession: Politician

Erik Jensen Torm (11 September 1684 - 23 February 1764) was burgermaster and chief of police in Copenhagen from 1731 to 1761. He was succeeded by his son-in-law Frederik Horn.

== Early life ==
Torm was born at Østergård in Salling. the son of farmer Jens Henriksen (c. 1652–1713) and Mette Eriksdatter Torm (1655–1723). His maternal grandfather was diocesan provost at Church of Our Lady in Copenhagen, Erich Olufsen Torm, whose last name he adopted. Torm completed his schooling in 1697.

== Career ==
Torm started his career as a lackey for Frederik IV in 1710. In 1712, together with the king, he was present at the Battle of Gadebusch. In 1714, he became a regiment scribe. In 1727, he returned to court service as the king's personal sservant. In 1829, he rescued the king out of the Royal Canon Foundry (Gjæthuset) on Kongens Nytorv after a canon had exploded during a test.

At Frederick IV's death, he was appointed administrator of Vallø Stift. On 19 February 1731, he was appointed mayor and chief of police in Copenhagen. From 1861, he was assisted by his son-in-law Frederik Horn, who10 years later formally succeeded him in the office.

In 1743–59, he acted as a Supreme Court justice in spite of his lack of formal education. He was also a member of the board of directors of the Royal Danish Theatre.

== Written works ==
Torm wrote a small booklet on agriculture. It was published anonymously as Kort Underretning om Ager-Dyrkning og andet som henhører til Land-Væsenet (1757, new edition 1762).

== Awards ==
Torm was appointed Justitsråd in 1737, titular Etatsråd in 1747 and real etatsråd in 1760.

== Personal life ==
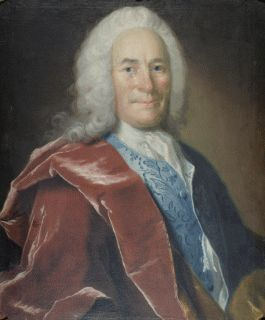
Erik Torm

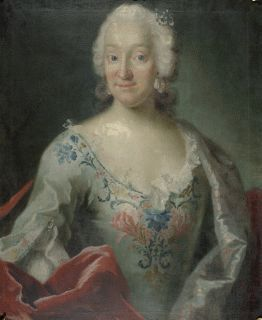
Anna Torm née Jesper.

On 7 December 1714, Torm married to Kirstine Ravn (c. 1692, - 1734). They had a son and two daughters. On 12 April 1737, he married secondly to Anna Thygesen (1699–1762). She was the daughter of Thyge Jespersen (1655–1706) and Anne Mikkels-datter (died 1721). Her father was the manager and later owner of Mattrup Manor. They had a daughter.

His son Ulrich Frederik Frederik Torm (Torn) (1721–1781) was a Lutheran minister. The daughter Mette Sophie Eriksdatter Horn (Torm) (1722–1791) was married to Frederik Horn (1708–1781). The daughter Frederikke Christiane Torm (1717–1773) was married twice, first to Otto Christian Rasch (1701–1748) and then to court physician Johan Gottfried Licht (1705–1762). The daughter Anna Christine Jensen Torm (1738–1809) was married to court pharmacist Johan Gottfried Becker (1723–1790).

== See also ==
- Vilhelm Bornemann
