= 1680 in Denmark =

- Decades: 1660s; 1670s; 1680s; 1690s; 1700s
- See also: Other events of 1680; List of years in Denmark

Events from the year 1680 in Denmark.

== Incumbents ==
- Monarch – Christian V
- Grand Chancellor – Frederik Ahlefeldt

== Births ==
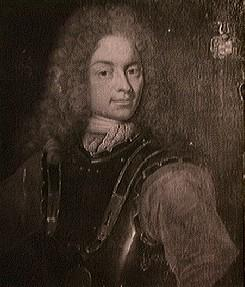
Michael Bille.

- 14 May – Michael Bille, admiral (died 1756)
- 26 October – Prince Charles of Denmark, prince of Denmark (died 1729)
- 20 November – Severin de Junge, Supreme Court justice and director of the Danish West India Company (died 1757)
- 28 November – Alexander Frederik Møsting, royal court official (died 1737)

=== Undated ===
- Rasmus Krag, naval officer (died 1755)

== Deaths ==
- 25 April – Simon Paulli, physician and naturalist (born 1603)
- 4 December – Thomas Bartholin, physician, mathematician, and theologian (born 1616)
- 29 December – Arent Berntsen, topographical-statistical author, businessman, banker, estate owner and councillor (born 1610)
