= Jacob Fosie =

Danish artist (1679–1763)

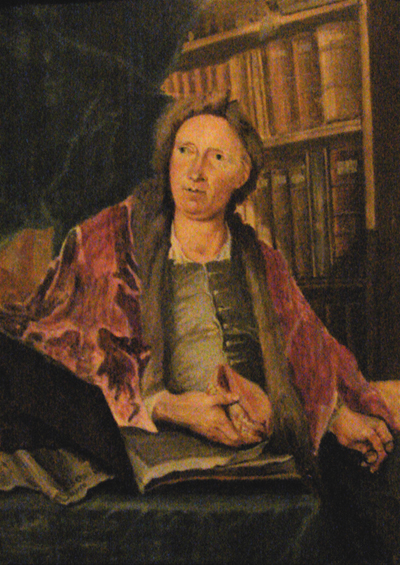
- Bendix Grodtschilling the Youngest by Jacob Fosie, Frederiksborg Palace
- Born: 1679; Copenhagen
- Died: 1 December 1763 (aged 83–84)
- Occupations: Artist, watercolor painter, etcher, engraver, organist and author

Jacob Fosie (1679 – 1 December 1763) was a Danish artist, watercolor painter, etcher, engraver, organist and author.

== Early life ==
Fosie was born in Copenhagen, of English descent. He was a student of Hendrick Krock. He painted landscapes in watercolor, mostly in the style of Dutch masters. Fosie held a salon for artists in his home. Among the frequent guests were the artists Johan Martin Preisler, Gustav de Lode and Michael Keyl, the painters Johan Hörner and Carl Gustaf Pilo, the sculptor Simon Carl Stanley, the poet Christian Frederik Wadskiær and several other writers.

== Family ==
He married Anna Dorothea Ilsøe and they had three children. Daughter Johanna Marie Fosie whom he taught together with her siblings Michael Fosie and Elisabeth Fosie was the most talented of the siblings, and she signed and published illustrations in her father's drawing book in 1741.

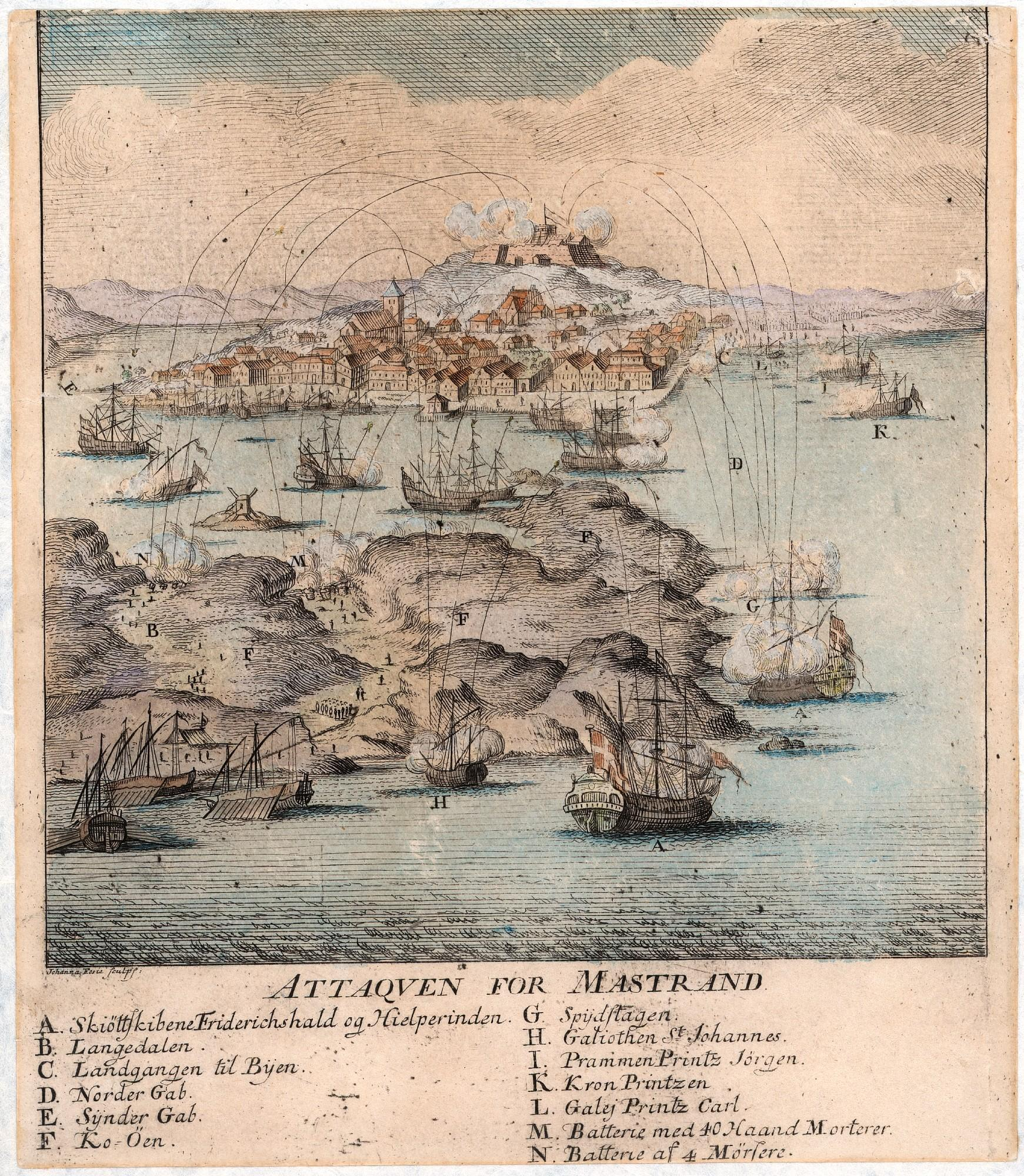
The Attack on Marstrand 1719 by Jacob Fosie, 1719

== Artistic interests ==
Fosie was a wealthy man; he busied himself with mechanics and linguistics, and was for several years organist at the Church of Holmen and as such undoubtedly an accomplished musician, although he once admitted that he was not practicing music outside of Sundays. Fosie was a member of the oldest Danish academy (1701) and the Academy of Fine Arts in Florence, but had also hardly ever been outside Denmark. Nevertheless, he was at home in all the major languages, as well as Latin culture, possessed a large and good library, and was highly regarded for his multifaceted skills and knowledge. He also published a number of drawing books including Drawing ABCs, Learning Cloths (1741–43), a collection of his students' works (1747) and a collection of landscapes (1746).
