= Marie Madeleine de Montaigu =

Marie Madeleine de Montaigu (née Le Croix) (1692–1736) was a Danish actress. She was employed first as a court-actor, and later became one of the first female actors to perform on a Public theatre in Denmark.

== Biography ==
Marie le Croix was born in Denmark as the child of parents of French origin. In 1715, she married Rene Magnon de Montaigu (1661–1737), the director of La troupe du Roi de Danemark, the French troupe that performed for the royal court, and the year after, she became a member of the trope and employed as court-actor.

In 1721, the French troupe, which had performed for the royal court in Copenhagen since 1682, fired by the king, who wished to hire an Italian Opera-trope instead. The French actors, who in many cases had lived there for generations, did not all wish to leave Denmark. Rene Magnon and another French immigrant, Etienne Capion, then asked permission to open a Public theatre. They were given royal permission and in 1722, the first Public theatre was opened in Copenhagen on Lille Grönnegade, the first theatre open to the public in the Danish language.

Capion was the director, Magnon was responsible for the actors, and Marie Madeleine became the first actress to have performed for the Danish Public on an official theatre. The female actors were few; among them were also Helene le Coffre, Maren Magdalene Lerche and Marie Madeleines own dotter Frederikke Sophie.

In 1728 the theatre was closed and Madeleine and her husband lived under difficult circumstances as French language-teachers.

== See also ==
- Lisbeth Cathrine Amalie Rose
- Anine Frölich
