= Lille Grønnegade Theatre =

Danish theatre (1722-1728)

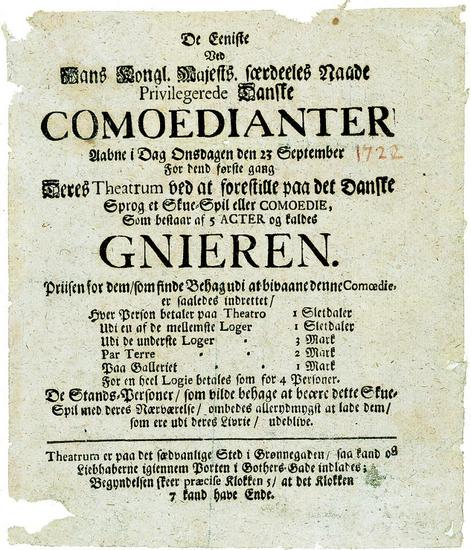
Poster for Molière's The Miser, 1722

Lille Grønnegade Theatre was a Danish theatre which was active from 1722 to 1728. It was the first public theatre in Copenhagen in Denmark.

== History ==
In 1721, the French troupe La troupe du Roi de Danemark, which had performed for the royal court in Copenhagen since 1682, was fired by the king, who wished to hire an Italian opera troupe instead. As the French actors, who in many cases had lived in Denmark for generations, did not all wish to leave, René Magnon and another French immigrant, Etienne Capion, asked for permission to open a public theatre. They were granted royal permission and in 1722, and the first public theatre was opened in Copenhagen on Lille Grønnegade, the first Danish-language theatre open to the public.

Capion was the director, Magnon was responsible for the actors, and Marie Madeleine de Montaigu became the first actress to have performed for the Danish public at an official theatre. The female actors were few: among them were also Helene le Coffre, Maren Magdalene Lerche and Marie Madeleine's own daughter Frederikke Sophie. Plays were performed in Danish but there was also dance: in 1726, Jean-Baptiste Landé was a guest ballet master.

The economic troubles, however, proved to be too difficult. In 1728, the theatre was closed, and in 1730, theatre was banned in Denmark until 1746.
