= 1683 in Denmark =

- Decades: 1660s; 1670s; 1680s; 1690s; 1700s
- See also: Other events of 1683; List of years in Denmark

Events from the year 1683 in Denmark.

== Incumbents ==
- Monarch – Christian V
- Grand Chancellor – Frederik Ahlefeldt

== Events ==
- The Danish Code is officially completed, providing the first codification of Danish legislation. Some statutes are still active today.

== Births ==
- 17 February – Claus Paarss, military officer and governor og Greenland (born 1762)
- 26 October – Christian Berregaard, Supreme Court justice, government official and landowner (died 1750)
- 16 November – Frederik Fabritius, goldsmith (died 1755)

=== Full date missing ===
- Johan Cornelius Krieger, architect (d. 1755)

== Deaths ==
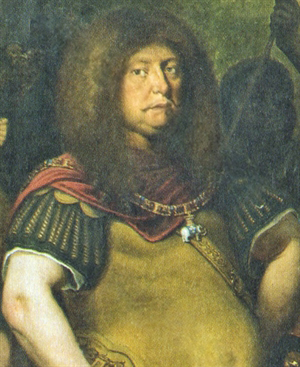
Holger Vind.

- 16 March - Henrik Bjelke, admiral (born 1615).
- 5 June– Holger Vind, statesman (born 1623)

=== Undated ===
- Jørgen Iversen Dyppel, governor (b. 1638)
