= Johanna Marie Fosie =

Danish artist (1726–1764)

- Born: 24 March 1726; Copenhagen, Denmark
- Died: 23 August 1764 (aged 38); Sværdborg Sogn, Denmark
- Known for: Painting
- Spouse: Jens Eriksen Westengaard< (m. 1758)

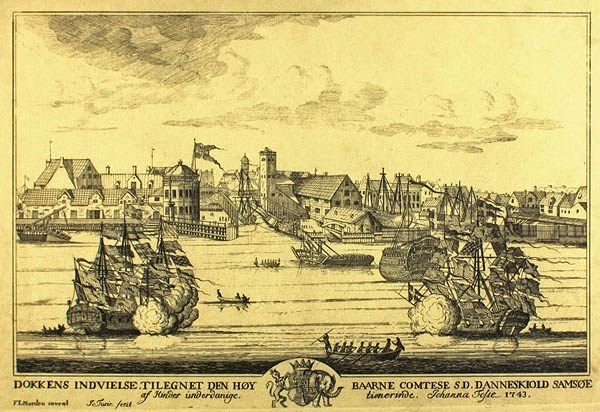
The inauguration of the Old Dock in Copenhagen 1739 by Johanna Marie Fosie, The Royal Library, Denmark, 1743

Johanna Marie Fosie (24 March 1726 – 23 August 1764) was a Danish painter, the first professional native female artist in Denmark.

== Biography ==
Fosie was the daughter of Anna Dorothea Ilsøe and the painter Jacob Fosie, who was a teacher in drawing from his home. She learned to paint from her father, together with her siblings Michael Fosie and Elisabeth Fosie. Johanna was the most talented of the siblings, and she signed and published illustrations in her father's drawing book in 1741.

Fosie lived in her parents' home until her marriage. Her parents held a salon for artists in their home. Among the most frequent guests were the artists Johan Martin Preisler, Gustav de Lode and Michael Keyl, the painters Johan Hörner and Carl Gustaf Pilo, the sculptor Simon Carl Stanley, the poet Christian Frederik Wadskiær and several other writers. In her parents' salon, she became a celebrated artist, was introduced into influential circles, and made many of her drawings and paintings there. She was particularly close to Johan Hörner, who painted her with a pencil in her study, illustrating her as the first female artist in Denmark; he also painted her brother and later her husband. Hörner seemed to have had an influence in her art. In 1757, she gave a still life oil painting as a gift to the king. In 1758, she married the vicar Jens Eriksen Westengaard. After her marriage, her activity as an artist lessened, but she did not stop altogether.

Of her drawings, several are preserved in Kobberstiksamlingen, on Rosenborg, in Kunstindustrimuseet and in private collections.

== See also ==
- Magdalene Bärens
