= Danish Police Museum =

Museum in Copenhagen, Denmark

Police Museum
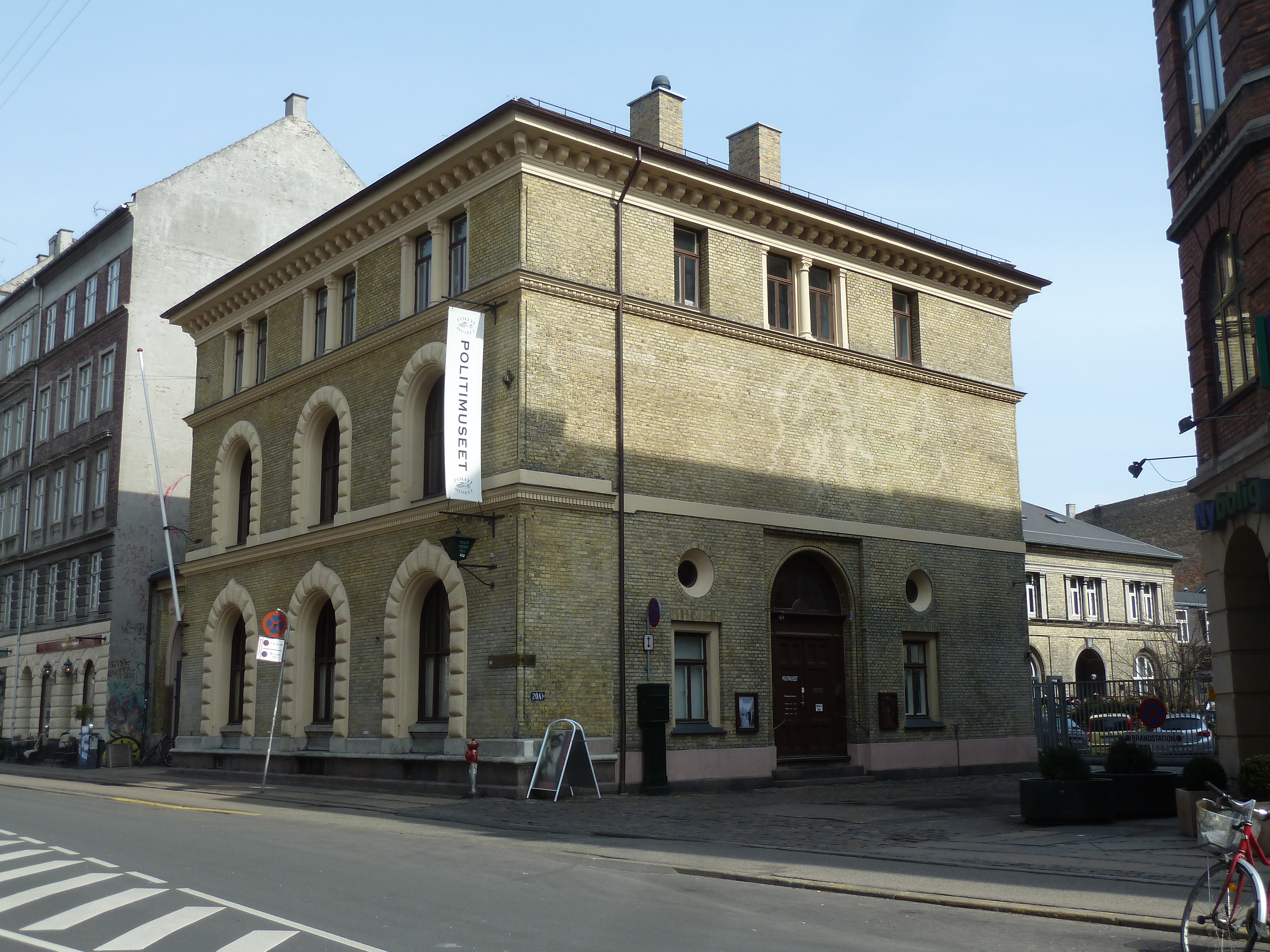
- The building on Fælledvej
- Established: 1993
- Location: Nørrebro; Copenhagen, Denmark
- Coordinates: 55.6901°N 12.5608°E
- Director: Frederik Strand
- Website: politimuseum.dk

The Danish Police Museum is dedicated to the history of law enforcement in Denmark. It is based in a former police station on Fælledvej, off Sankt Hans Torv, in the Nørrebro district of Copenhagen, Denmark.

== History ==
The museum traces its history back to 1904 when a collection of artefacts was founded in the cellar under Copenhagen Court House. The current museum was inaugurated in 1993. It underwent a thorough refurbishment in 2004.

== Building ==
Fælledvej Police Station, or Station 6, opened on 21 October 1884. It maintained a staff of 64 policemen: One chief police officer, four superior police officers, 11 inspectors and 46 ordinary policemen. The top floor contained a residence for the head of the police station. First floor contained accommodation for 16 unmarried policemen. The police station closed on 25 May 1977.

== Exhibitions ==
The ground floor contains an exhibition about the history of the Danish Police Corps from its foundation in 1682 until the present day. First floor contains an exhibition about a criminological exhibition, featuring different forms of crimes as well as police investigation. The museum also hosts a special exhibitions.

== See also ==
- Copenhagen Police Headquarters
