= 1676 in Denmark =

- Decades: 1650s; 1660s; 1670s; 1680s; 1690s
- See also: Other events of 1676; List of years in Denmark

Events from the year 1676 in Denmark.

== Incumbents ==
- Monarch – Christian V
- Grand Chancellor – Frederik Ahlefeldt

== Events ==
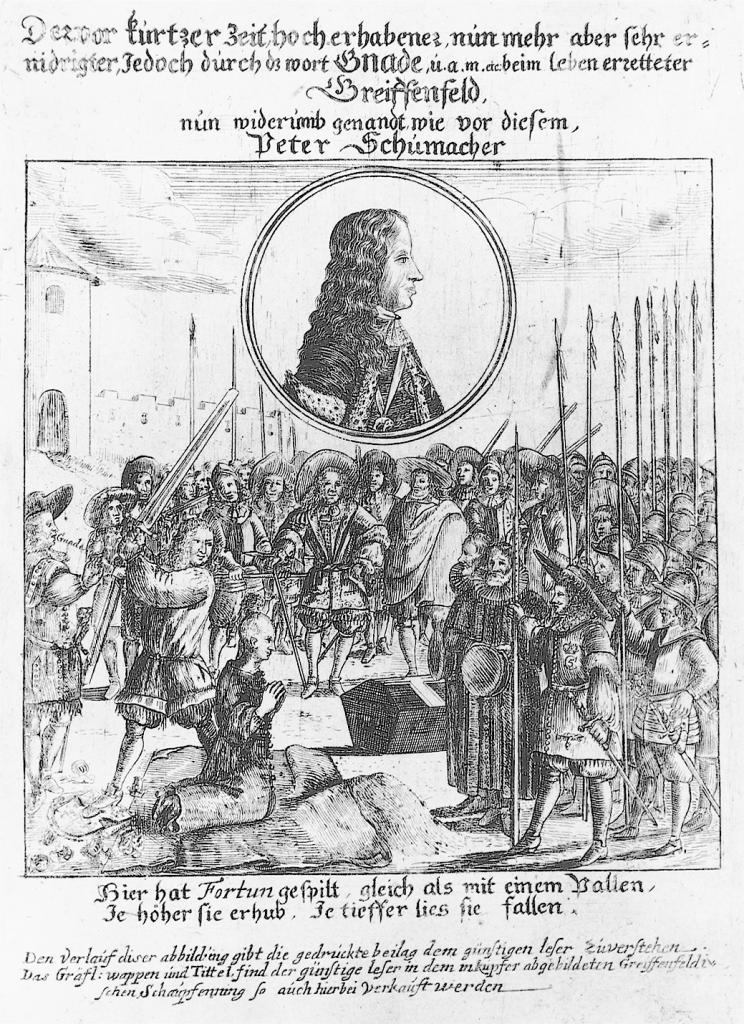
Griffenfeld at the moment when he is pardoned on the scaffold on 5 June, Contemporary illustration

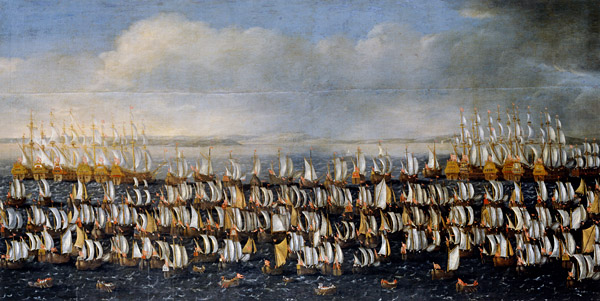
Danish invasion of Scania on 29 June. Painting by Claus Møinichen

- 11 March – Peder Griffenfeld is arrested at Copenhagen Castle and brought to Kastellet where he is imprisoned.
- 8 May – Dutchman Cornelis Tromp becomes Admiral-General in the Royal Danish Navy and knight in the Order of the Elephant.
- May 25–26 – The Battle of Bornholm results in a minor strategic victory to a Danish-Dutch fleet led by Niels Juel against a Swedish fleet.
- 26 May – The show trial against Griffenfeld ends with his conviction of all charges against him for simony, bribery, oath-breaking, malversation and lèse-majestéand and treason. He is sentenced to loss of honour, life and estate.
- 1 June – The naval Battle of Öland results in a decisive Danish-Dutch victory against a Swedish fleet and Danish naval supremacy that was upheld throughout the war.
- 6 June – Griffenfeld is pardoned on the scaffold, at the very moment when the axe was about to descend, and his sentence is commuted to lifelong imprisonment.
- 23 June – The County of Schackenborg is established by Otto Didrik Schack, 1st Count of Schackenborg from the manors of Schackenborg, Sødamgård, Solvig and Store Tønde.
- 29 June – A Danish fleet transports 14,500 soldiers across the Sound, landing them just south of Helsingborg, and Scania becomes the main battle ground for the remainder of the war.

=== Undated ===
- Rømer's determination of the speed of light: Danish physicist Ole Rømer makes the first ever quantitative measurements of the speed of light in Paris.
- Dutch Golden Age painter Jacob Koninck moves to Denmark.

== Births ==
- 4 March – Hans Schack, 2nd Count of Schackenborg (died 1719)

=== Full date unknown ===
- Christian Thomsen Carl, naval officer (died 1713)

== Deaths ==
- 1 January – Abel Cathrine, courtier and favorite of the queen of Denmark (born c. 1626)
- 27 February – Hans Schack, noble and commander-in-chief of the Danish army (born 1608)
- 5 March – Abel Schrøder, woodcarver (born c. 1602)
