= Defence Judge Advocate Corps (Denmark) =

Military Prosecution Service
- Forsvarets Auditørkorps
- Coat of arms
- Active: 1659; 367 years ago
- Country: Kingdom of Denmark
- Branch: Joined/shared
- Role: Military justice
- Size: 30
- Part of: Ministry of Defence
- Headquarters: Kastellet
- Nickname: FAUK
- Website: Official FAUK

Commanders
- Judge Advocate General: Lars Stevnsborg

The Military Prosecution Service or Judge Advocate General's Corps (Danish: Forsvarets Auditørkorps, short FAUK) is a Danish independent military prosecutor and the legal branch of the Danish military. It is a Level.I command and is under the Ministry of Defence. The Judge Advocate General (Danish: Generalauditør) heads the Defence Judge Advocate Corps. It is located at Kastellet in Copenhagen.

The Judge Advocate General and Judge Advocates are members of the military system, but outside the military rank system. The Chief of Defence, otherwise the commander of all Danish military personnel, does not have authority over judge advocates prosecutors.

In a military criminal case the Defence Judge Advocate Corps conducts investigation and decides whether or not a charge should be brought up.

== List of Judge Advocate Generals ==
| No. | Portrait | Name (born–died) | Term of office | | | Ref. |
| No. | Portrait | Name (born–died) | Took office | Left office | Time in office | Ref. |
|---|---|---|---|---|---|---|
| 1 | | Poul Tscherning (1627–1666) | 3 June 1659 | 17 September 1666 † | 7 years, 79 days | |
| 2 | | Herman Meier (1631–1685) | 1666 | 1679 | 12–13 years | |
| 3 | | Elias von Hübsch (?–1703) | 2 June 1679 | December 1703 | 24 years, 5 months | |
| 4 | | Frederik von Weiberg (1670–1720) | 11 December 1703 (Note: Appointed, but never took office, as he served as Envoy to Vienna.) | | | |
| – | | Severin Wildschütz; Acting | 11 December 1703 | 24 December 1709 | 6 years, 13 days | |
| 5 | | Hieronymus Bornemann (1680–1720) | 24 December 1709 | December 1720 † | 10 years, 11 months | |
| 6 | | Daniel Ditleff Dreesen (?–1755) | 24 December 1720 | 29 October 1742 | 21 years, 309 days | |
| 7 | | Johan Gottlieb Linck (?–1761) | 29 October 1742 (Note: Served as Judge Advocate General in Norway from 25 December 1730.) | 11 January 1749 | 6 years, 74 days | |
| 8 | | Georg Christoph Schrøder | 22 January 1749 | 9 March 1757 | 8 years, 46 days | |
| 9 | | Herman Alexander Caroc (?–1771) | 9 March 1757 | November 1766 | 9 years, 7 months | |
| 10 | | Johan Ernst Eric Schmidt (1716–1774) | 11 November 1766 | 8 May 1774 † | 7 years, 178 days | |
| 11 | | Vilhelm Bornemann (1731–1801) | 19 May 1774 | 15 February 1801 † | 26 years, 272 days | |
| 12 | | Anker Vilhelm Frederik Bornemann (1763–1854) | 13 March 1801 | 2 February 1822 | 20 years, 326 days | |
| 13 | | Andreas Aagesen (1781–1846) | 3 February 1822 | 15 November 1846 † | 24 years, 285 days | |
| 14 | | Anton Wilhelm Scheel (1799–1879) | 23 November 1846 | 13 July 1851 | 4 years, 232 days | |
| 15 | | Carl Christian Hall (1812–1888) | 19 August 1851 | 15 April 1854 | 2 years, 239 days | |
| – | | Georg Bernhard Bornemann (1815–1884); Acting | 15 April 1854 | 1 April 1856 | 1 year, 352 days | |
| (14) | | Anton Wilhelm Scheel (1799–1879) | 1 April 1856 | 21 March 1871 | 14 years, 354 days | |
| 16 | | Georg Bernhard Bornemann (1815–1884) | 21 March 1871 | 22 November 1883 | 12 years, 246 days | |
| 17 | | Hans Christian Steffensen (1837–1912) | 22 November 1883 | 3 August 1910 | 26 years, 254 days | |
| 18 | | Hans Christian Nicolai Giørtz (1858–1942) | 3 August 1910 | 31 December 1928 | 18 years, 150 days | |
| 19 | | Victor Pürschel (1877–1963) | 1 January 1929 | 31 May 1945 | 16 years, 150 days | |
| 20 | | Erik Schäffer (1880–1970) | 1 June 1945 | 31 October 1950 | 5 years, 152 days | |
| 21 | | Knud Franklin Pilgaard Christensen (1889–1990) | 1 November 1950 | 31 January 1965 | 14 years, 91 days | |
| 22 | | Jens Harpøth (1915–?) | 1 February 1965 | 1984 | 18–19 years | |
| 23 | | Verner Egon Gyde (1923–?) | 1984 | 1993 | 8–9 years | |
| 24 | | Per Helmer Lichtenstein (1942–2017) | 1993 | 31 October 2007 | 13–14 years | |
| 25 | | Lars Stevnsborg | 1 November 2007 | Incumbent | 19 years, 4 days | |

== See also ==
- Judge Advocate General
- http://fauk.dk
