= Vilhelm Bornemann =

Danish judge (1777–1856)

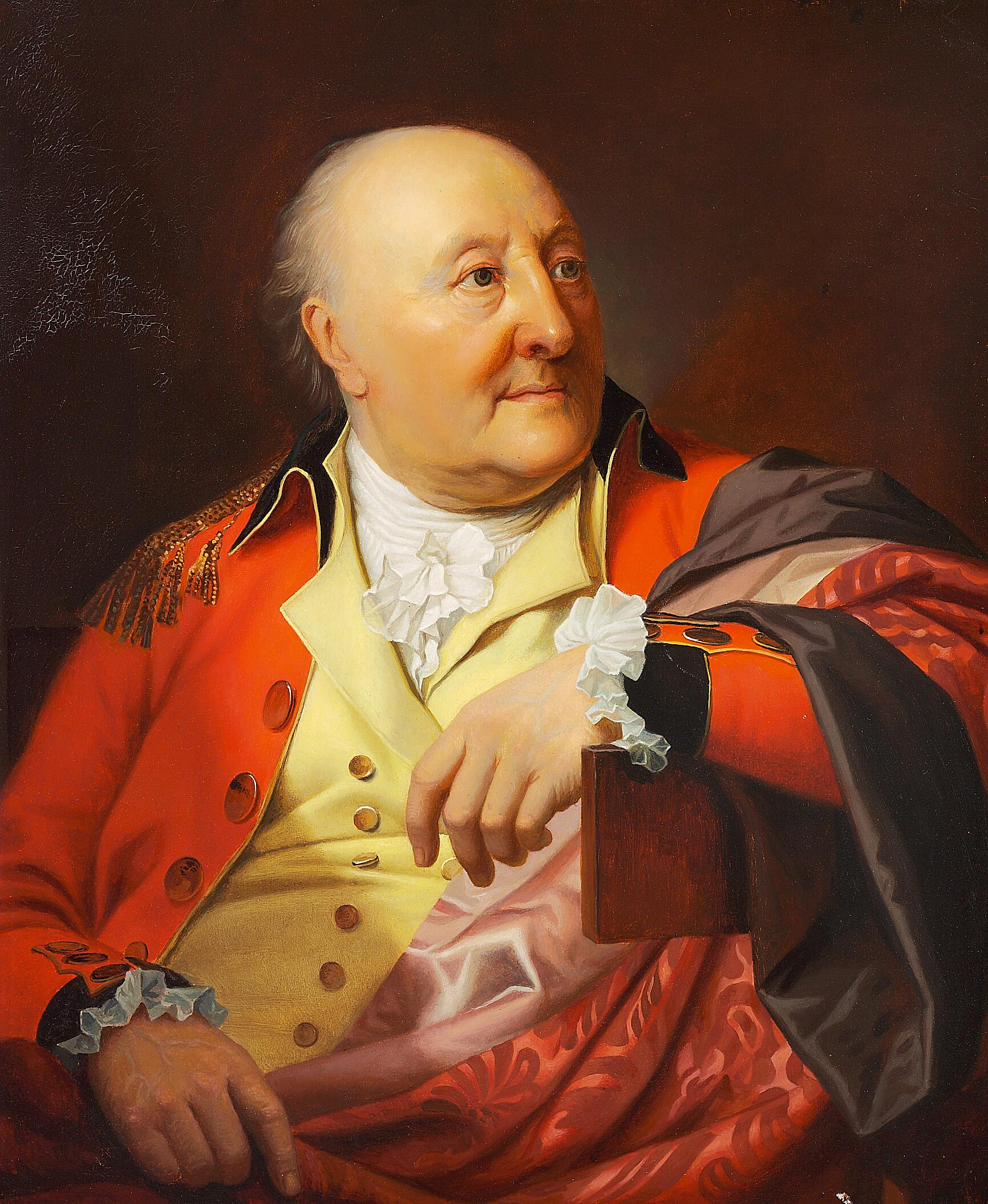
- Portrait of Bornemann by Jens Juel in Copenhagen Police Headquarters.

Chief of Copenhagen Police Force
- In office 1771–1772
- Monarch: Christian VII
- Preceded by: Frederik Hoppe
- Succeeded by: Christian Fædder
- Constituency: Copenhagen Police Force

Personal details
- Born: 20 September 1731 Bergen, Denmark-Norway
- Died: 15 February 1801 (aged 69) Copenhagen, Denmark
- Occupation: Judge Advocate General, chief of police, Supreme Court justice

Vilhelm Bornemann (20 September 1731 – 15 February 1801) was a Danish Judge Advocate General, chief of police and extraordinary Supreme Court justice. His sons Anker Vilhelm Frederik Bornemann and Cosmus Bornemann (1768–1819) were both ennobled by letters patent on 9 July 1911.

== Early life and education ==
Bornemann was born on 20 September 1731 in Bergen, then part of Denmark-Norway, the son of bishop Oluf Bornemann (1683–1747) and his second wife Ingeborg Marie Hansen (died 1753). His paternal grandfather Cosmus von Bornemann (Bornemann, 1637–1692) was a professor of law at the University of Copenhagen and had served as burgermaster of the city. Bornemann matriculated from Bergen Latin School in 1740. He earned a law degree from the University of Copenhagen in 1849.

== Career ==
In 1753, Bornemann was employed as a military prosecutor. In 1757, he became a secretary in the Ministry of War. 1749 saw him appointed as War Councillor (Krigsråd). In 1763, he was appointed president of the Commission of Inquiry (inkvisitionskommissionen). In 1767, he was appointed senior military prosecutor (overauditør). In 1774, he was promoted to Judge Advocate General (generalauditør). In 1767, he became a councilman. In 1771, Struense, installed him as chief of police. After Struense's fall, he was replaced by Christian Fædder. He was instead appointed as a Supreme Court judge. From 1772 to 1679, he served as one of the directors of the Royal Danish Theatre. He took a genuine interest in theatre and literature, translated a number of plays for the Royal Danish Theatre. He endorsed Dorothea Biehl to write plays for the theatre. In 1779, he was made a member of the important Great Agrarian Commission as well as of the Commission for the Plejestiftelsen, 1786.

== Personal life ==
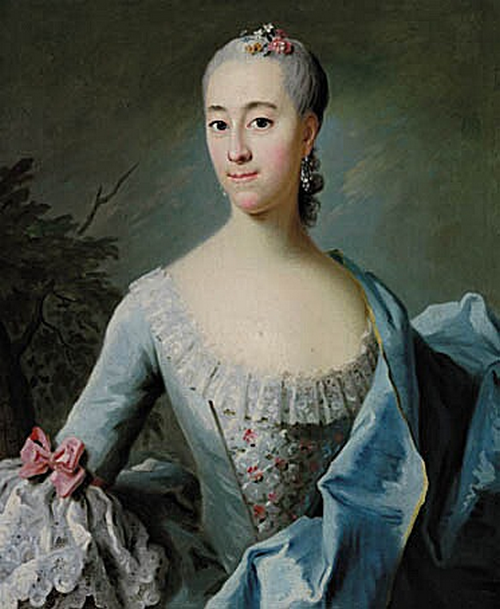
Talia Bornemann painted by Johan Hörner.

On 5 September 1762, Bornemann married to Talche (Thalia) Storm (1738–1779). She was a daughter of customs official Anker Pedersen Storm (c. 1704–1778) and his second wife Mette Kirstine Mouridsdatter Trap (1716–1742,).

Bornemann was survived by two sons and four daughters. The eldest son Anker Vilhelm Frederik Bornemann (1763–1854) served as president of the Supreme Court. The younger son Cosmus Bornemann (1768–1819) was an army officer. He owned the estates Espe and Bjergbygaard. He was married to Christiane Louise Callisen (1773–1836), a daughter of the prominent physician Heinrich Callisen. Anker and Cosmus Bornemann were both ennobled by letters patent on 9 July 1811. The eldest daughter Christine Vilhelmine Marie Vilhelmine von Bornemann (1764–1802) was married to the landowner Peter Christian Zeuthen of Tølløse, Søgård and Sonnerup (1775–1823). The second daughter Thalia Vilhelmine Juliane Bornemann (1765–1792) was married to the army officer Didrik Carl von Lorentz (1749–1832). The third daughter Sophie Vilhelmine Caroline von Bornemann (1767–1792) was married to the naval officer Johan Cornelius Krieger. The fourth daughter Frederikke Wilhelmine Charlotte Bornemann (b. 1770) was married to the naval officer Steen Andersen Bille.

== Awards ==
Bornemann was awarded the title of titular etatsråd in 1773. real etatsråd in 1776 and Konferensråd in 1781.
