= La troupe du Roi de Suede =

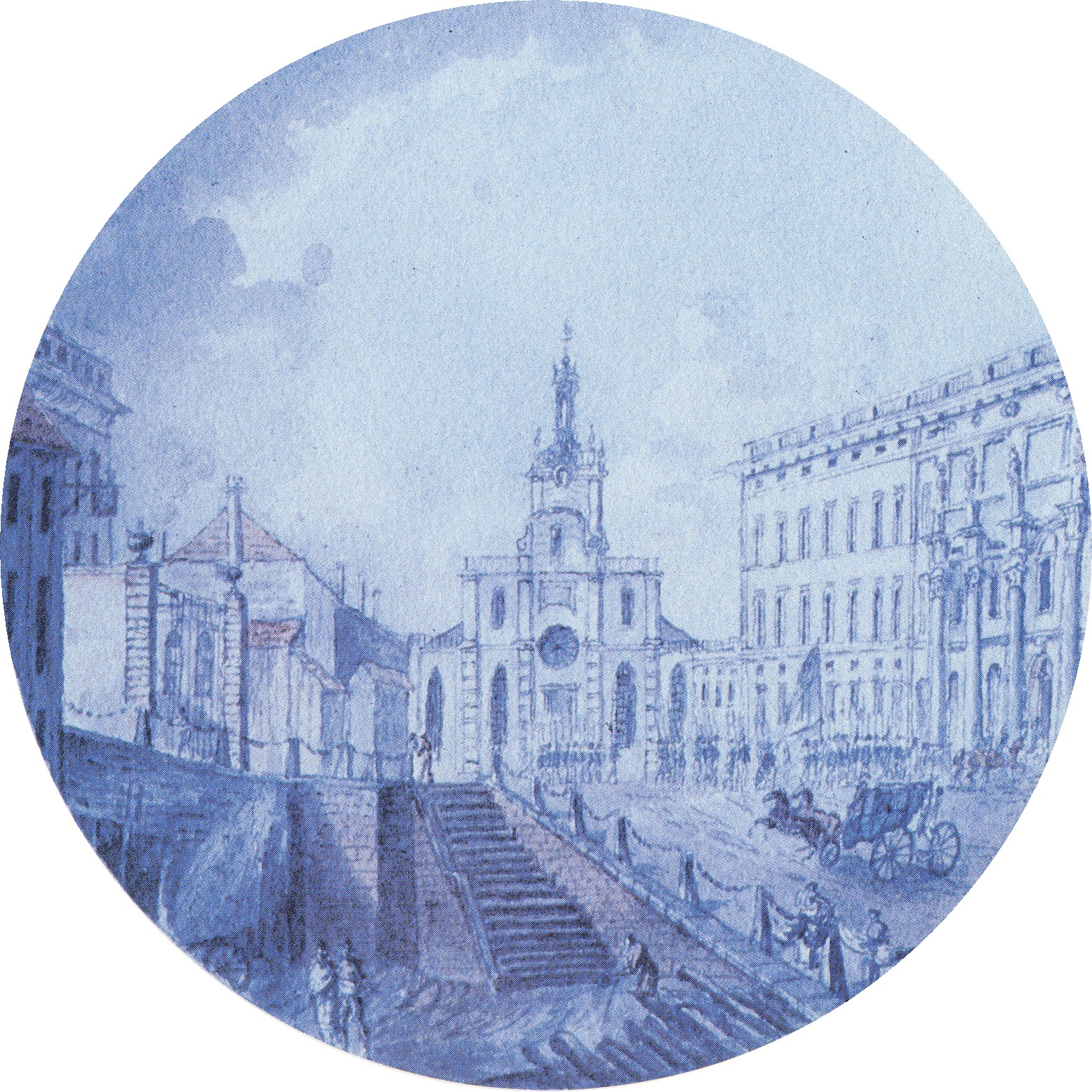
Stora Bollhuset 1780

La troupe du Roi de Suede, or Roi de Suede for short, was a French-speaking Swedish court theater, active at the Royal Swedish court from 1699 until 1706.

The Roi de Suede was engaged by Charles XII of Sweden because a French language court theater was regarded to be a compulsory thing in the representational life of a royal court at the time. Its leader was Rosidor fils, and commonly, the company have therefore been referred to as simply "The Rosidor Troupe". The company performed both spoken drama, opera and ballet, and was regarded to have upheld a high quality. The performances were staged at the residences of the royal court, as well as in the Bollhuset in Stockholm.

The Great Northern War in 1700 caused financial difficulties for the court theater. The queen dowager would not allow the troupe to perform at court after the king had left to serve in the war. The king therefore gave permission to the Roi de Suede to perform at Bollhuset for the public in the city of Stockholm, and ordered the royal court to visit the performances there. From February 1700, they performed in public. Because of the language barrier, these were not a success among the majority of the public. They also arranged public masquerades with card gambling at Bollhuset, which evidently became popular, though also ill reputed. On at least one occasion, at Thorn in 1703, the troupe, or a part of it, traveled to perform for Charles XII during his war service.

In 1703, several of the members of the troupe left when the contract was no longer renewed because of costs. A smaller part of the troupe, however, remained, acquired a second contract in 1704, and continued the activity in Stockholm until the end term of the second contract in 1706.

== Members ==
- Marie Anne Aubert, singer
- Jean Francois Bénard, dancer
- J. B. de Crous, musician
- Gillette Boutelvier-Duchemin, d. 1765
- Jean Pierre Duchemin, 1674–1754
- Antoine Dupré, dancer
- Francoise Fabe-Picard, dancer
- Claude Guilmois de Rosidor, director
- Marianne Guillemay du Chesnay Bérge de Rosidor
- Robert Lemoine de la France, musician
- Henri de la Motte, musician
- Louis Picard, dancer
- Jacques Rénot, musician
- Marie Trouche-du Chesnay-de Rosidor, d. 1705.
- Paul Belleville de Foy, 1699–1700
- Chantreau, 1703
- Charles Gourlin dit Roselis, 1699–1700
- M. François de la Traverse, sieur de Sévigny (1658–1715), 1700–1706
- Catherine Lenuque, épouse Toubel, 1699–1701
- Marie Longueil La Roque, 1702
- Charles-Louis Pallai Versigny, 1700
- Jacques Sarabat dit La Rocque
- François Toubel, 1699–1702

== See also ==
- La troupe du Roi de Danemark
- Du Londel Troupe
