= 1677 in Denmark =

- Decades: 1650s; 1660s; 1670s; 1680s; 1690s
- See also: Other events of 1677; List of years in Denmark

Events from the year 1677 in Denmark.

== Incumbents ==
- Monarch – Christian V
- Grand Chancellor – Frederik Ahlefeldt

== Events ==
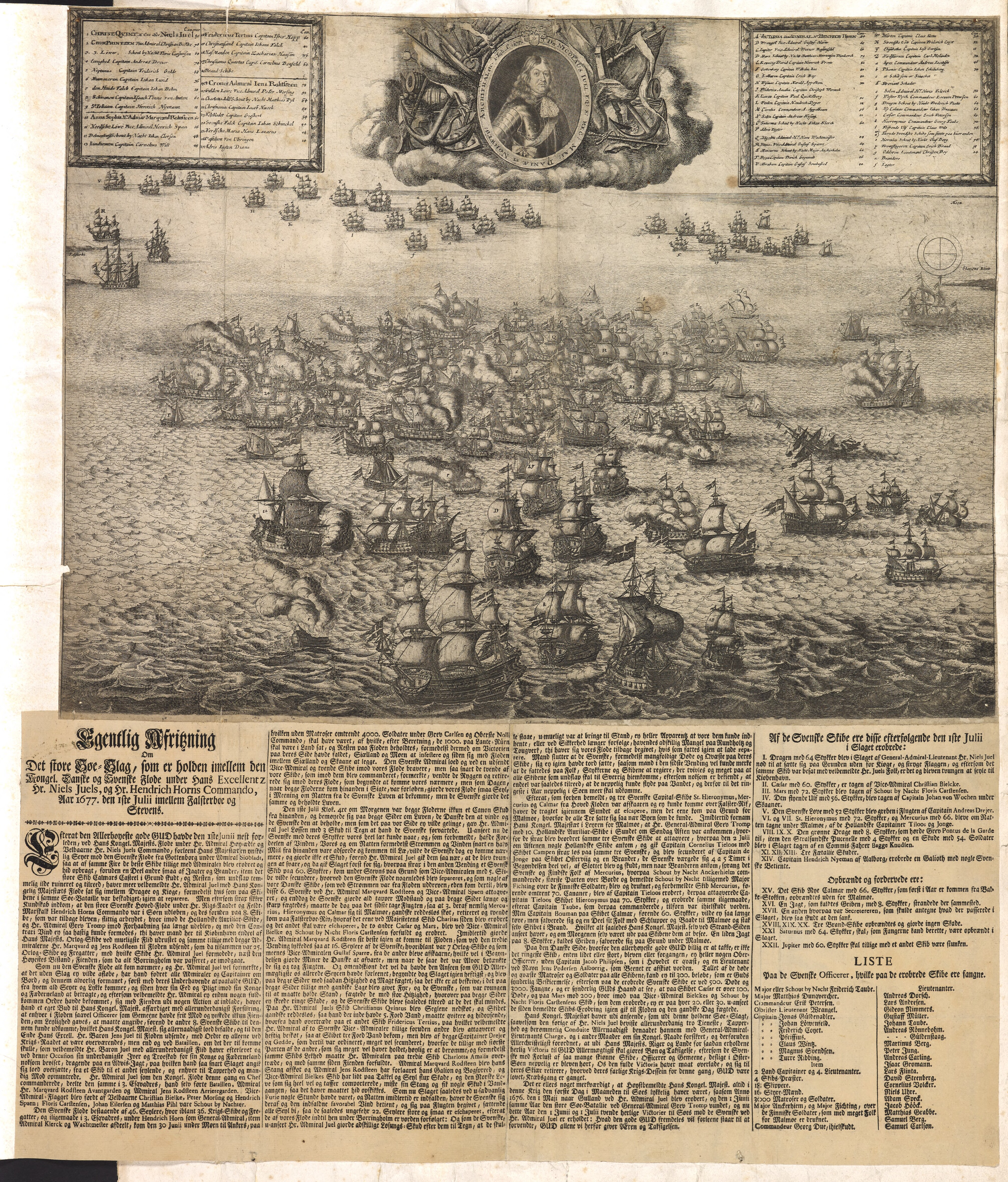
1–2 July: Battle of Køge Bay.

May

- 31 May–1 June – the naval Battle of Møn results in Danish-Norwegian victory.

June

- 11 June–5 July – Swedish forces hold off the Danish during the Siege of Malmö.

July

- 1–2 July – the Battle of Køge Bay results in a decisive Danish victory which helps to establish Niels Juel's reputation.
- 6–23 July – Danish-Norwegian forces siege the harbor town of Marstrand in the Battle of Marstrand.
- 14 July – the Battle of Landskrona results in Swedish victory.

August

- 28 August – the Battle of Uddevalla results in Danish-Norwegian victory.

December

- 31 December – Christian V establishes the County of Samsø for mistress Sophie Amalie Moth from the manors of Brattingsborg and Bisgård.

=== Undated ===
- Ulrik Frederik Gyldenløve's mansion which will later become known as Charlottenborg Palace is completed as the first building at Kongens Nytorv in Copenhagen.
- The first Copenhagen Stocks House, a military prison, is completed at a site just south of the Nyboder barracks.
- The Abrahamstrup estate in Hornsherred becomes known as Jægerspris Castle.
- Thomas Hansen Kingo is appointed Bishop of Funen.
- Peder Hansen Resen publishes a fragment of his otherwise unpublished Atlas Danicus.

== Births ==
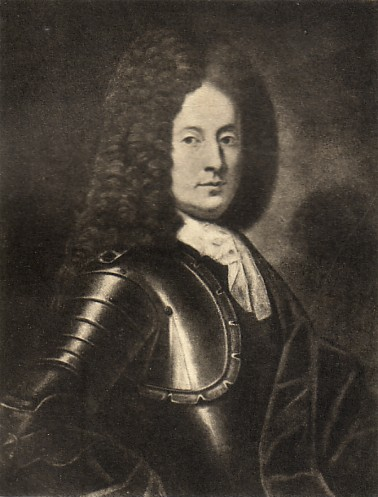
Ulrich Kaas.

- 8 August – Princess Sophia Hedwig, Danish princess (d. 1735)
- 4 October – Ulrich Kaas, naval officer (died 1746)

== Deaths ==
- 26 February – Steen Ottesen Brahe, military officer and landowner (b. 1623)
- 24 May – Anders Bording, poet and journalist (b. 1619)
- 9 August – Elisabeth Augusta Lindenov, Countess of Schleswig-Holstein (b. 1623)
