= 1675 in Denmark =

- Decades: 1650s; 1660s; 1670s; 1680s; 1690s
- See also: Other events of 1675; List of years in Denmark

Events from the year 1675 in Denmark.

== Incumbents ==
- Monarch – Christian V

== Events ==
- 22 June – The Royal Danish Academy of Surgery is founded as a replacement for the old Theatrum Anatomico-chirurgicum.

== Births ==
- 25 March – Prince Christian of Denmark (died 1695 in Germany)

== Deaths ==
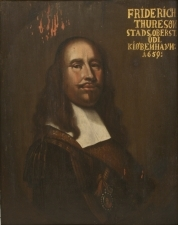
Frederik Thuresen-

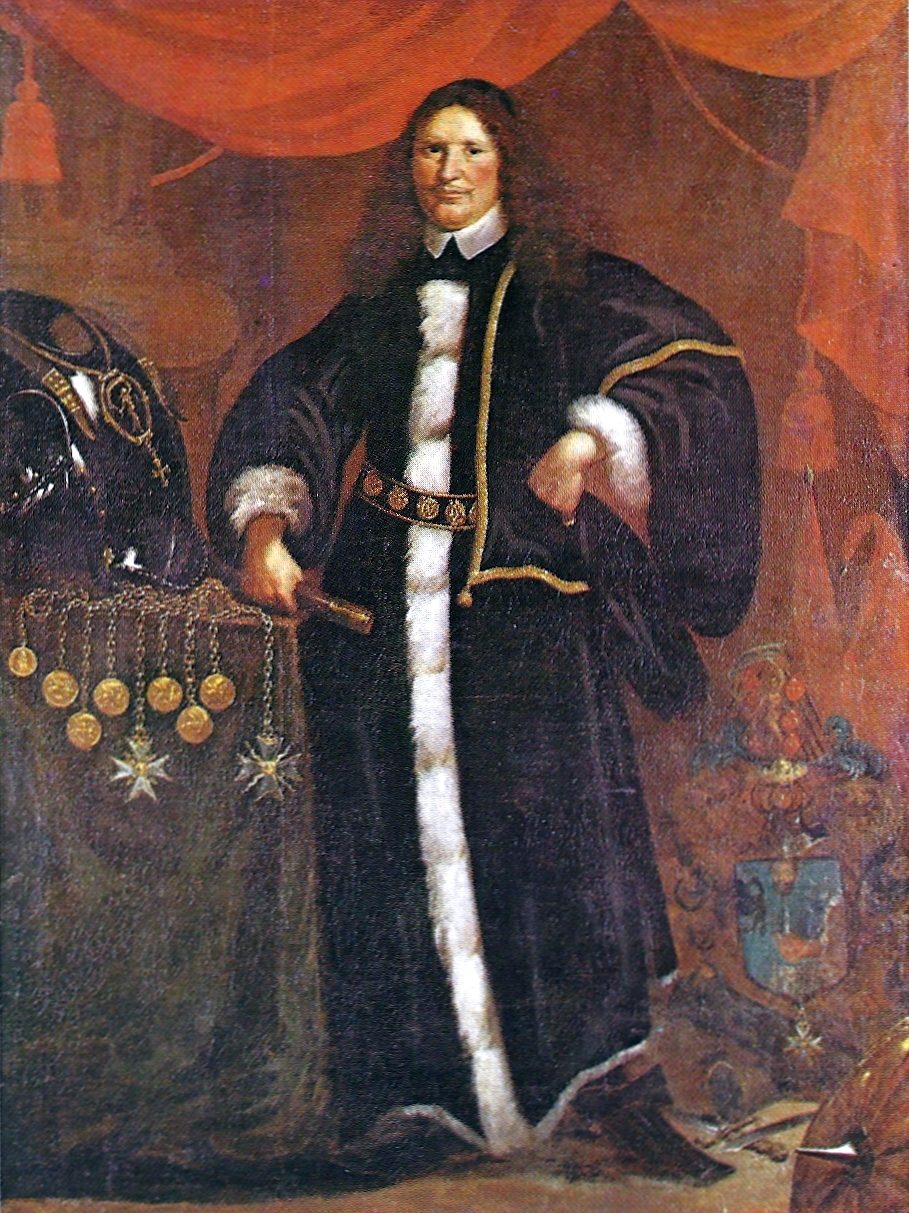
Cort Adeler

- 6 January – Jørgen Rosenkrantz, educator and county governor (born 1607)
- 17 April – Frederik Thuresen, businessman (born 1613)
- 20 May – Vitus Bering, historian (born 1617)
- 29 August – Joachim Irgens von Westervickm businessman and landowner (born 1611 in Germany)
- 28 September – Lucas Debes, clergy (born 1623)
- 5 November – Cort Adeler, naval officer, admiral (born 1622).
