= 1735 in Denmark =

- Decades: 1710s; 1720s; 1730s; 1740s; 1750s
- See also: Other events of 1735; List of years in Denmark

Events from the year 1735 in Denmark.

== Incumbents ==
- Monarch – Christian VI
- Prime minister – Iver Rosenkrantz (until 12 May), Johan Ludvig Holstein-Ledreborg

== Events ==
- Vemmetofte Convent is established after the death of Princess Sophia Hedwig through her will.

== Births ==
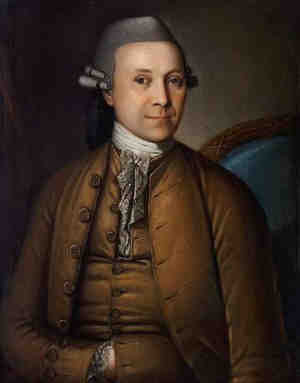
Jacob Baden.

- 6 January – Otto Christopher von Munthe af Morgenstierne, civil servant, judge and landowner (died 1809)
- 1 March – Caroline Thielo, actress (died 1754)
- 4 May – Jacob Baden, philologist and critic (died 1904)
- 23 June – Johan Boye Junge, master carpenter, developer and director of Copenhagen Fire Corps (died 1807)
- 28 August – Andreas Peter Bernstorff, politician (died 1797)

== Deaths ==
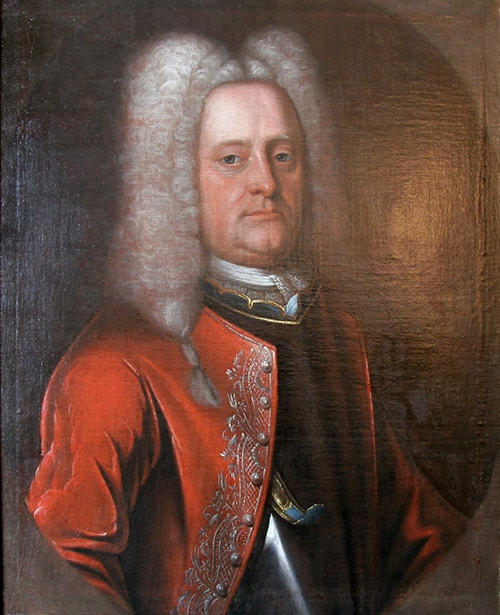
Hans Himmerich.

- 13 March – Princess Sophia Hedwig, princess of Denmark (born 1677)
- 16 March – Hans Himmerich, chief oif police (born 1681)
- 22 April - Lorentz Reichwein, military officer (born 1680)
- 15 August – Werner Jasper Andreas Moltke, government official, Lord President of Copenhagen (born 1755 in Mecklenburg)
