= Hans Himmerich =

Norwegian politician (1777–1856)

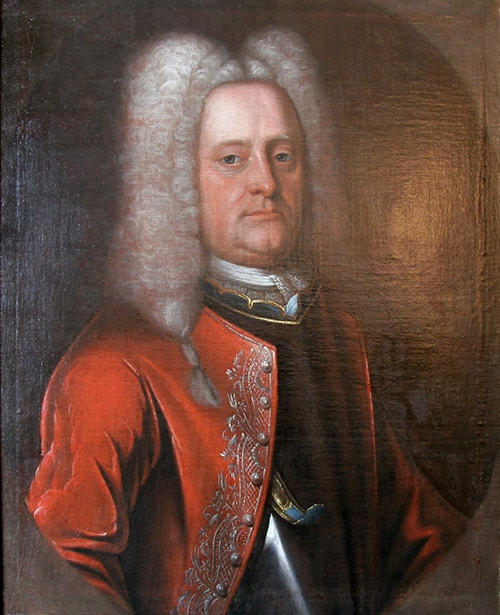
- Portrait of Hans Himmerich by Nikolaj Wichmann in Copenhagen Police Headquarters.

Chief of Copenhagen Police Force
- In office 1726–1731
- Monarch: Frederick IV of Denmark
- Preceded by: Johan Philip Ratecken
- Succeeded by: Erik Torm
- Constituency: Copenhagen Police Force

Personal details
- Born: 19 December 1681 Aalborg, Denmark
- Died: 16 March 1735 (aged 53) Halkær, Denmark
- Occupation: Burgermaster, chief of police
- Profession: Politician

Hans Himmerich (19 December 1681 - 16 March 1735) was burgermaster and chief of police in Copenhagen from 1726 to 1731. He became extremely unpopular in the city following the Copenhagen Fire of 1728.

== Early life ==
Himmerich was born on 19 December 1681 in Aalborg, the son of merchant Jens Nielsen Himmerich (1626–88) and Elsebe Hansdatter Mumme (1652–1734). He matriculated from Aalborg Latin School in 1702 and then joined the army. He later wentinto Polish and Russian military service, returning to Denmark in 1725 with rank of colonel. On 19 August 1727, he married to Elisabeth Bjørnskov (died 1731). She was chamber maid for queen Anna Sophie. He owned a house on Gråbrødretorv.

== Career ==
On 2 September 1726, Himmerich was appointed chief of police in Copenhagen. On 7 October, he was also appointed burgermaster. He became very unpopular in the population following the Copenhagen Fire of 1728. Allegedly he responded to the fire by getting drunk and falling asleep in a lumberyard outside the city where he had hidden. He also had a reputation for being a particularly brutal law enforcer. He introduced "parrot cages# for public display of prostitutes. As police chief, he had a reputation for mistreating the city's Jewish population.

After Frederick IV's death in 1730, he lost his support at the royal court. In 1831, he was replaced by Erik Torm.

== Later life ==
After his wife's death in July 1731, Himmerich moved back to Aalborg. He owned the farm Halkær at Nibe. He died at Halkær on 16 March 1735. He is buried in Budolfi Church, Aalborg.
