= Rosidor fils =

French actor and playwright

Claude-Ferdinand Guillemay du Chesnay, better known as Rosidor fils, (c.1660 – after 1718) was a 17th-18th century French playwright and actor.

The son of the comedians Jean Guillemay du Chesnay and Charlotte Meslier, he played in Bordeaux in 1687 then was hired in Rouen in Prince de Condé's troupe in 1690. In November 1691, he had a try at the Comédie-Française but was denied accession.

Back in province, he performed in Brussels in 1695, then in Duke of Lorraine's troupe with which he went to Metz and Aachen in 1698. In 1699, he moved to Sweden to the service of King Charles XII and played in Stockholm with La troupe du Roi de Suede until 1706. Leaving Sweden, he stopped in Hamburg in 1708, in Kiel in 1709 and in Prague in 1718, after which period his whereabouts are unknown.

He authored some theatre plays including:

- 1691: Les Amours de Merlin (Rouen)
- 1691: Divertissements du temps, ou la Magie de Mascarille
- 1701: Les Valets de chambre nouvellistes (Stockholm)
