= Rosidor =

French actor, playwright (17th century)

- Occupations: Playwright, Actor
- Known for: Works in French theater

Jean Guillemay du Chesnay, called Rosidor, was a 17th-century French playwright and actor.

== Career ==
First a comedian in the Troupe du Marais, Rosidor composed a five-act tragedy, entitled La Mort du Grand Cyrus ou La Vengeance de Tomiris in 1662. He also wrote a comedy, Les divertissements du Temps ou la Magie de Mascarille, and another play, Les amours de Merlin in 1671, although some sources date the plays in 1691 and attribute them to his son, Claude. (With father and son sharing the same nickname, this is a great source of confusion.)

Rosidor played in the satire La critique des Satures de Monsieur Boileau in 1668, a play which was quickly forbidden.

Rosidor became the leader of a troupe that moved in 1669 to the Danish court, where it gave performances both in French and in German. However, the death of King Frederick III in 1670 put an end to their business. The troupe performed later in Germany, where they served the Duke of Celle, and in Italy.

== Personal life ==
Rosidor married Charlotte Meslier, the daughter of a couple of comedians trained by Mathias Meslier and Nicole Gassot, with whom he had a son, Claude-Ferdinand Guillemay du Chesnay who would also be an actor.

== Works ==
- 1662: La Mort du Grand Cyrus ou La Vengeance de Tomiris, Cologne ou Liège, Guillaume-Henri Streel.
- 1671: Les divertissements du Temps ou la Magie de Mascarille, Rouen.
- 1671: Les amours de Merlin, Rouen.

== Bibliography ==
- Émile Campardon, Les comédiens du Roi de la Troupe française, Genève, 1970
- J. Fransen, Les comédiens français en Hollande au XVII et XVIIIe siècles, Genève, 1978
