= Johan Hörner =

Swedish-born Danish painter

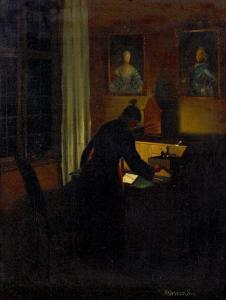
Nighttime Interior

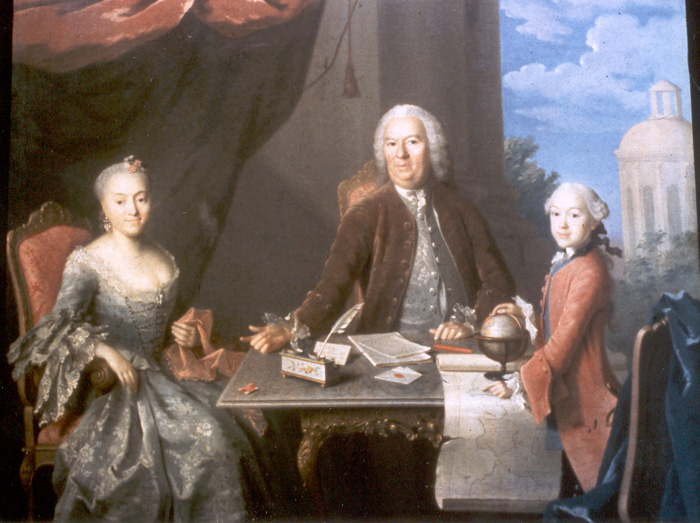
Industrialist Abraham Pelt and his family

Johan Hörner (28 January 1711 – 4 March 1763) was a Swedish-born Danish painter who specialised in portrait painting.

== Biography ==
He began his studies with Johan Henrik Scheffel in Stockholm and worked there for a time. However, as a Pietist (a member of a Lutheran sect that was out of favor with the established church), he faced serious discrimination. As a result, he moved to Denmark in 1734, where he took lodging with a carpenter in a district of Copenhagen that was largely Pietist.

For a time, he helped find refuge for other self-exiled Swedes, but soon came under scrutiny for his activities and moved to the countryside. In 1741, a new wave of Pietist refugees arrived in Copenhagen; including Sven Rosén, a major figure in the movement. Rosén also received assistance from Hörner.

Hörner attempted to win an appointment as court painter but, despite the fact that King Christian VI was sympathetic to the Pietists, he was not accepted. It has been suggested that his style was too realistic and the King wanted portraits that were more idealized. A sample portrait of Crown Prince Frederick does, in fact, present him as rather less attractive than he appears in other contemporary portraits.

Instead, he found work portraying the clergy and the well-to-do bourgeoisie. He also produced cabinet paintings, family portraits, still lifes and "Natstykker" (paintings set at night, lit only by candles or a fire), which were very popular at the time. Many of his portraits from the 1750s show the influence of Carl Gustaf Pilo and Balthasar Denner. He became a regular attendee of the artistic salons held at the home of Johanna Marie Fosie; the first such salon in Denmark.

His works are unsigned and many may not have been identified. A portrait of the naval officer, Adam Frederik Lützow, was first determined to be his as recently as 2007. Among his most familiar portraits are those of Hans Egede, Lauritz de Thurah and Hans Adolph Brorson.

== List of works ==
Frederiksborg Castle

- Louise, Queen of Denmark (1746)
- Hans Adolph Brorson (1756)
- Princess Siohie Hedvig (1757, copy of other work)
- Peter Schiønning (1760)
- Lauritz de Thurah
- Hans Egede
- Holger Skeel
- Jens Schelderup Sneedorff (attributed)

Other

- Louise, Dutchess of Sachsen (1844)
- Frederik Ludvig Christian von Beenfeld (1762, Museum Lolland-Falster)
- Abraham Pelt (Brdr. Petersens jomfrukloster. 1759)
- Louise, Countess of Hessen (Vemmetofte, 1761)
- Adam Gottlob greve Moltk (Museum Lolland-Falster)
- Eberhard David Hauber (1871)
- Adam Frederik Lützow

== Gallery ==
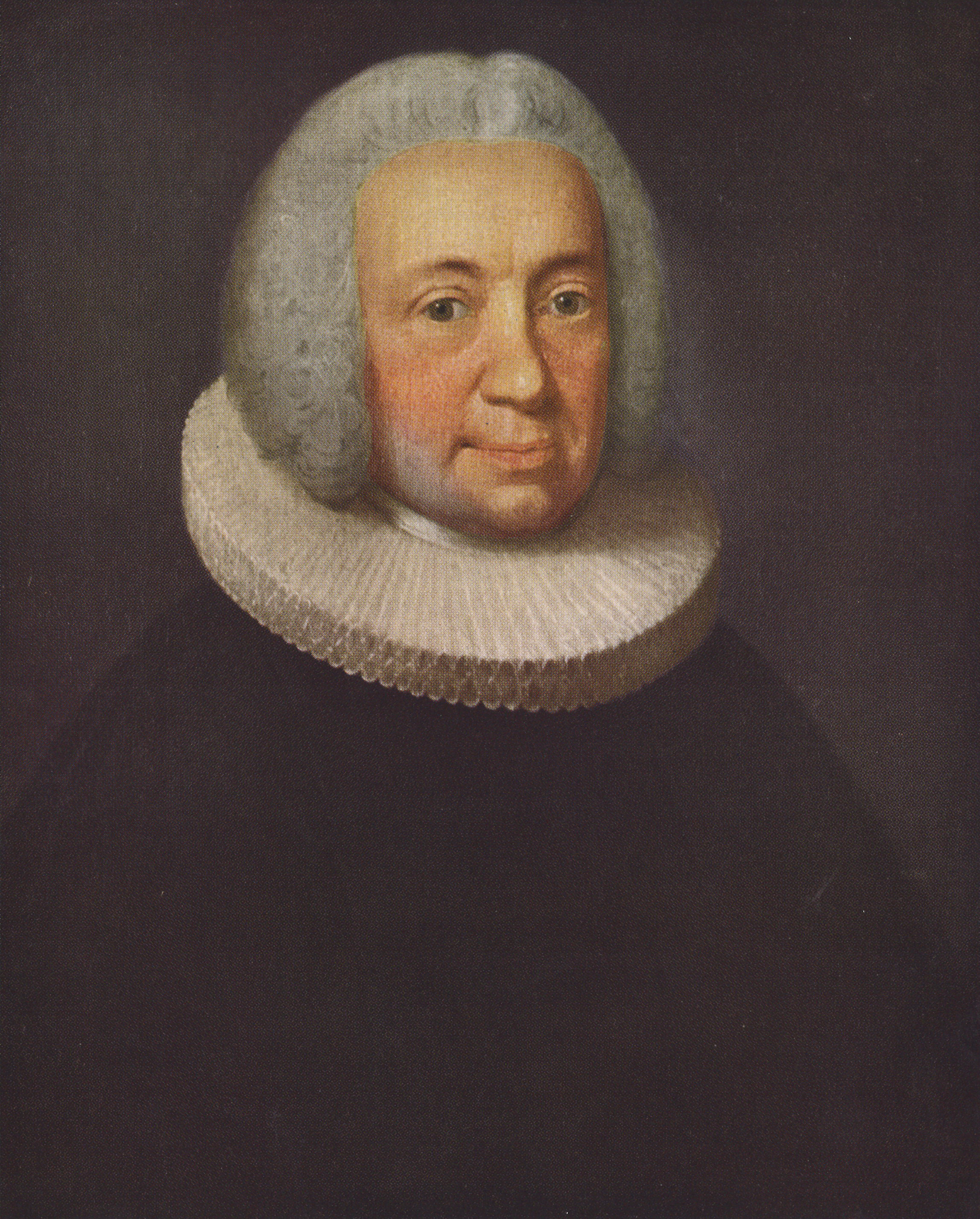
Hans Adolph Brorson (1756)).

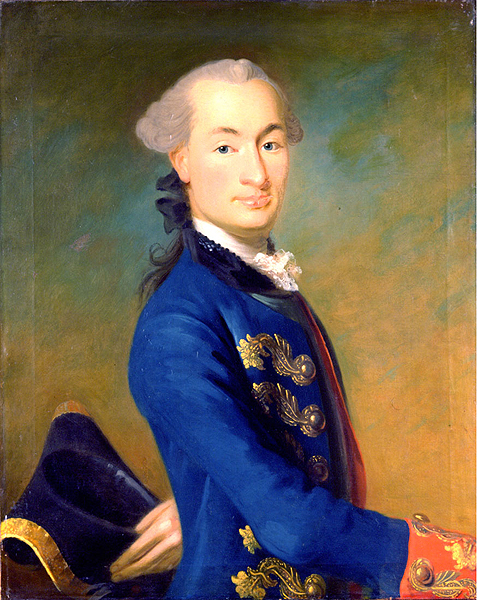
Peter Schiønning (1760).

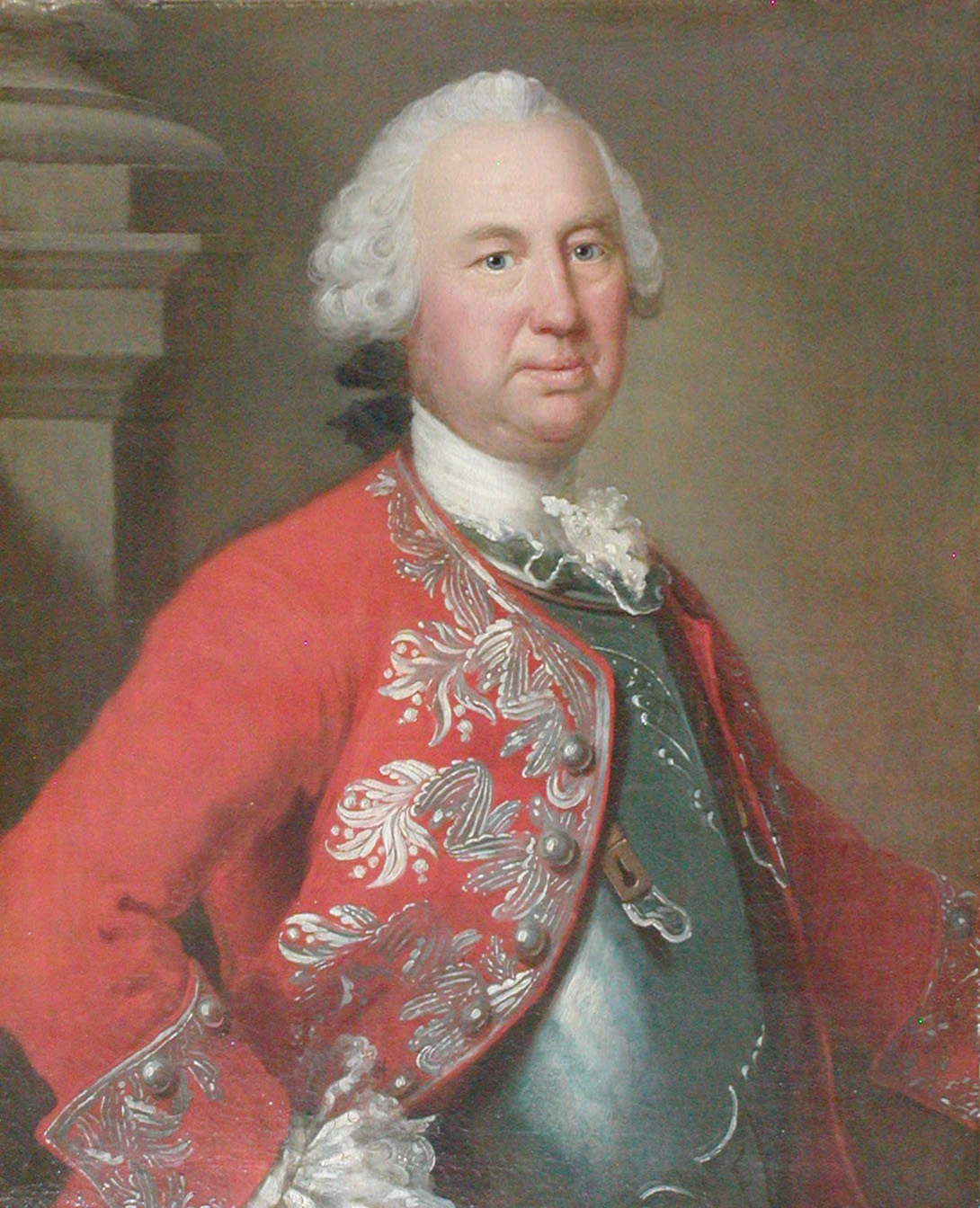
Lauritz de Thurah (1764))

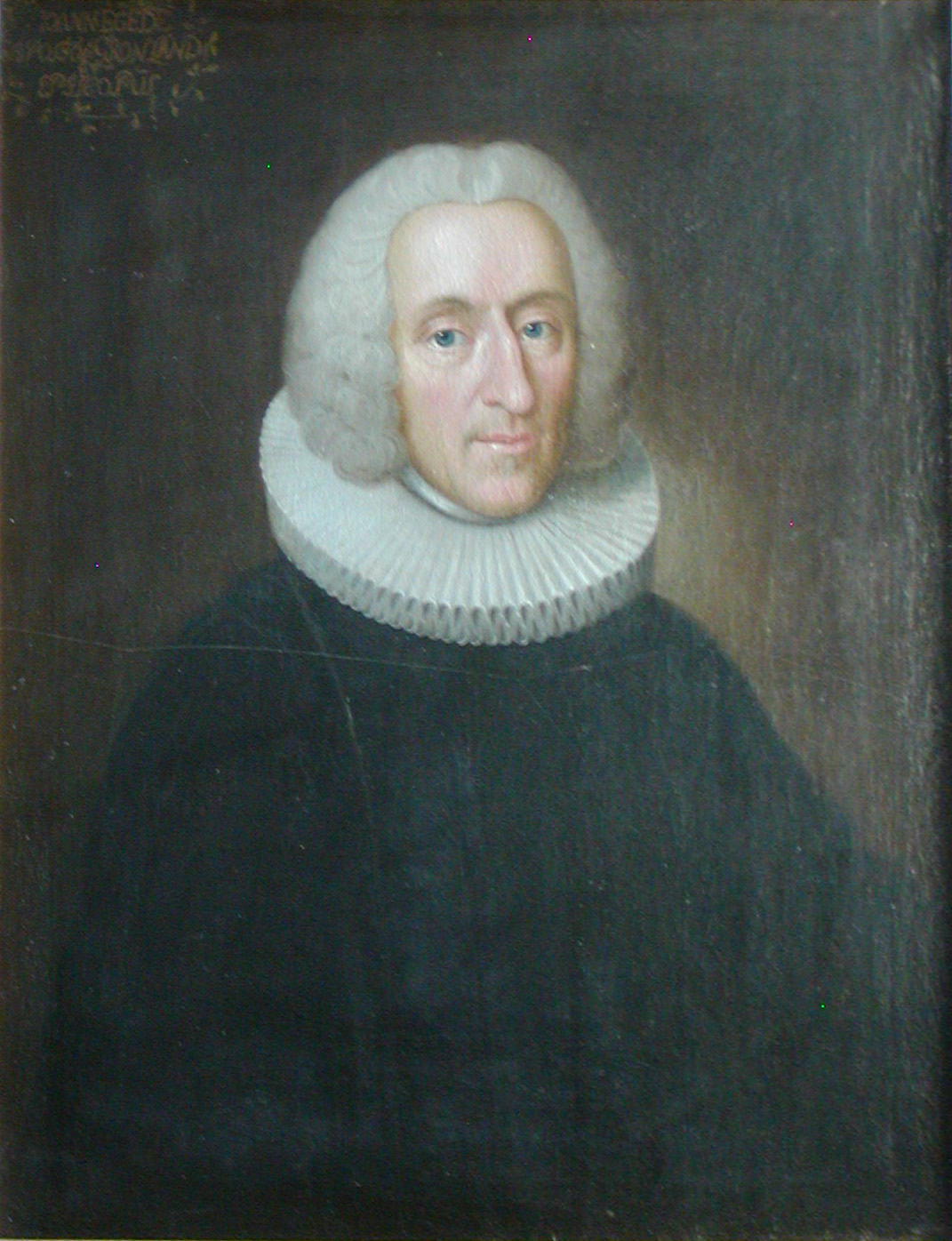
Hans Egede.

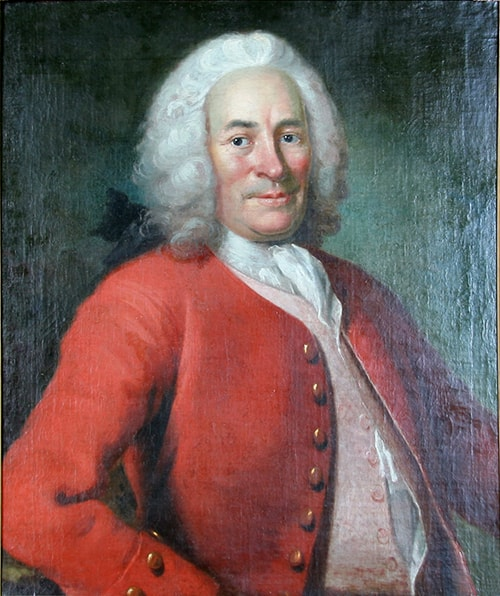
Erik Torm.

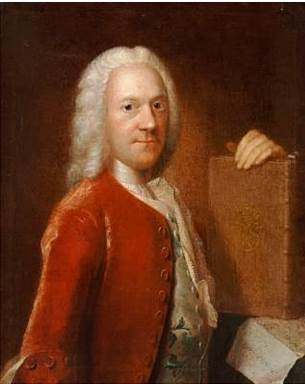
Jacob Langbæk.

Holger Skeel.

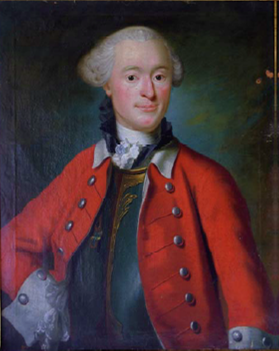
Eskild de Falsen
