= Copenhagen Police Headquarters =

Building in Copenhagen, Denmark

Coordinates: 55.6707°N 12.5722°E

- Københavns Politigård
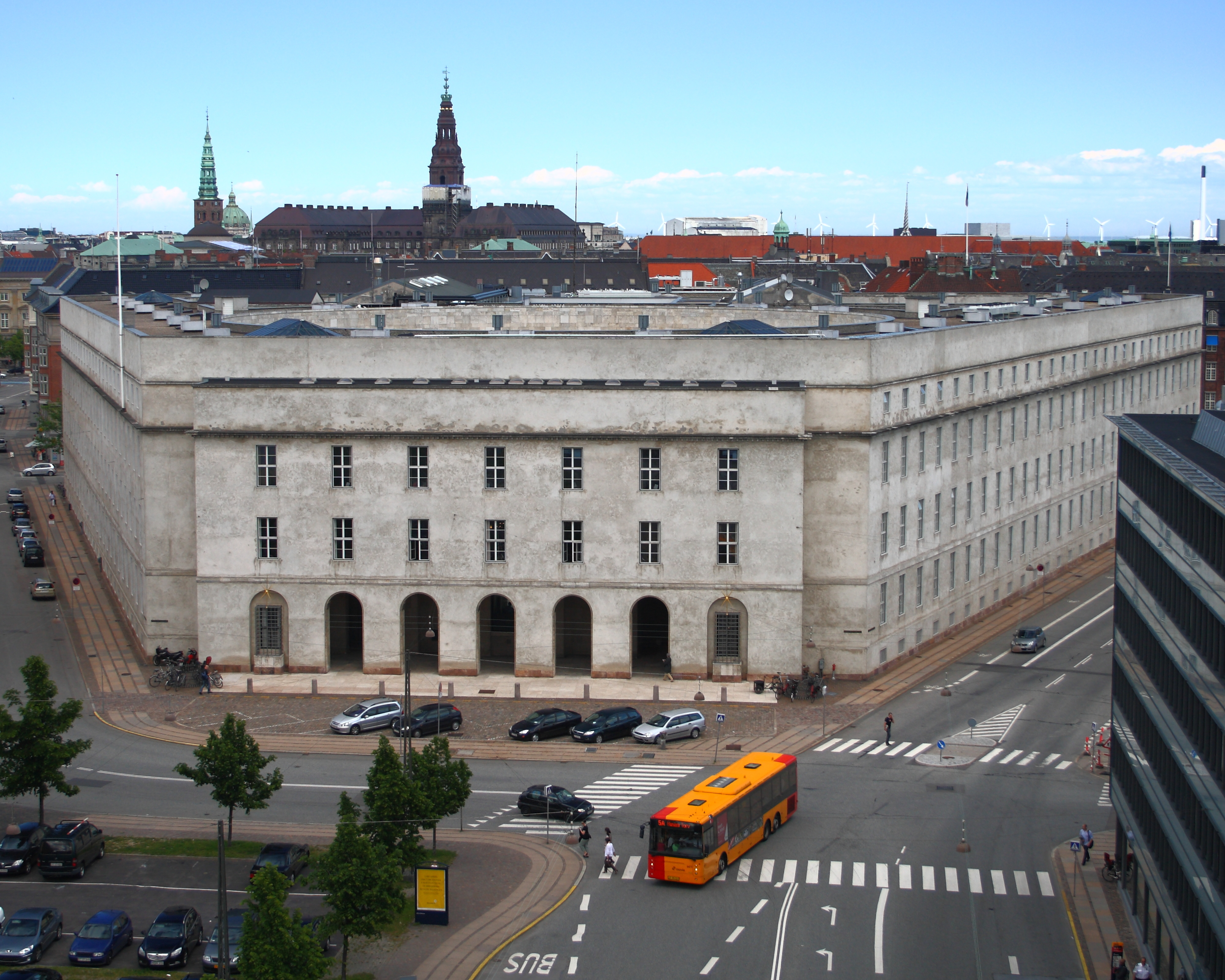
- Interactive map of the Copenhagen Police Headquarters area
- Alternative names: Politigården

General information
- Architectural style: Neoclassical and Nordic Classicism
- Location: Copenhagen
- Current tenants: Police of Denmark
- Construction started: 1918
- Completed: 1924
- Owner: Copenhagen Municipality

Technical details
- Floor count: 4 (above ground)

Design and construction
- Architects: Hack Kampmann and Aage Rafn

The Copenhagen Police Headquarters building (Danish: Københavns Politigård) is located on Polititorvet southwest of the centre of Copenhagen, Denmark. Designed by Hack Kampmann and Aage Rafn in 1918 in the Neoclassical style, often referred to as Nordic Classicism, it was completed in 1924.

== Background ==
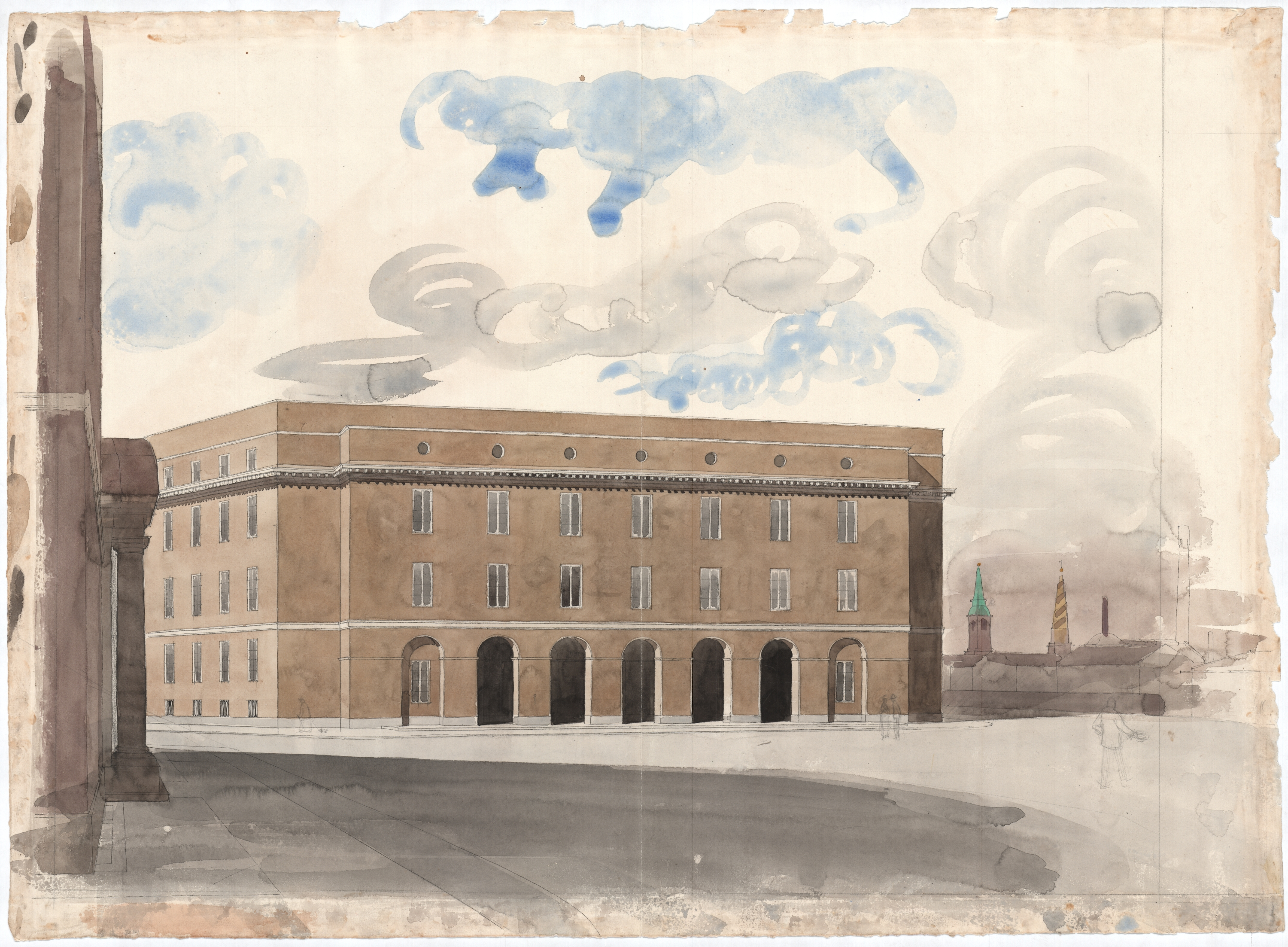
Drawing of the building by Hack Kampmann

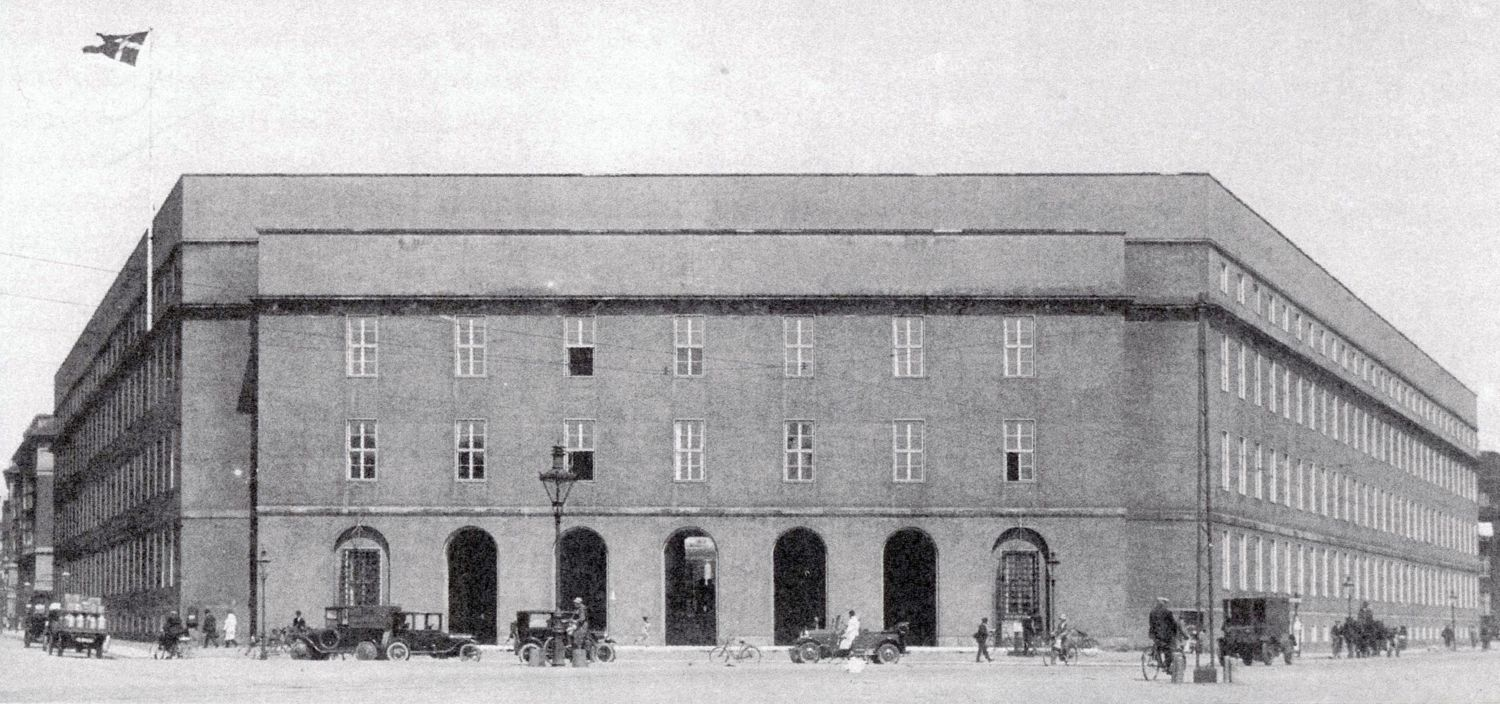
The building shortly after its completion in 1924

Until late in the 19th century, the area around today's Police Headquarters was part of Kalvebod Beach. After the quayside had been established, construction began on the Glyptotek and Vestre Hospital. In 1906, a street plan was drawn up for the area which at the time was known as the Rysensteen Quarter. It was decided in 1916 that the state and Copenhagen Municipality should together construct a building there for the Copenhagen police which had until then been headquartered in the Copenhagen Court House on Nytorv.

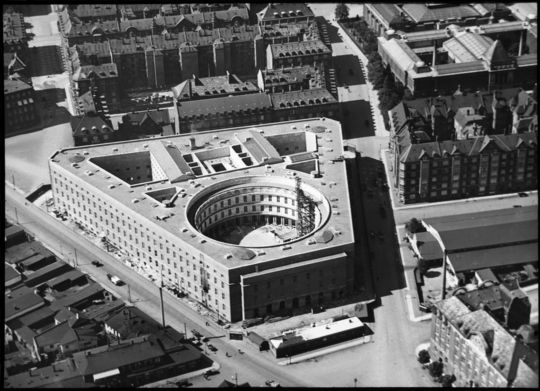
The building under construction, c. 1922

Hack Kampmann (1856–1920) was commissioned to design the building in the summer of 1918. Work on the foundations began in August of that year with 3,816 reinforced concrete piles. He was assisted in the work by several other architects including Aage Rafn (1890–1953) and Holger Jacobsen and his son Hans Jørgen Kampmann. Rafn exerted considerable influence on the design of the building. Hack Kampmann, who died in June 1920, did not live to see the completion of his building in early 1924.

== Architecture ==
The building is said to be the last example of Neoclassical architecture in Northern Europe. It typically juxtaposes squares and circles, light and darkness and the horizontal with the vertical. Its interior is inspired by the Renaissance architecture of southern Europe and by Baroque decorations. There are also features based on Roman craftsmanship and on Art Deco. The outside of the building is intentionally austere, intensifying the attraction of the colourful, well-formed features inside, including dark terrazzo flooring and oversized door and window frames so meticulously crafted. The round courtyard, 45 m (148 ft) in width, is surrounded by a colonnade consisting of 44 Doric columns. The small square-shaped courtyard, dominated by eight colossal pillars, contains a sculpture of the "Snake Killer" (Slangedræberen) by Einar Utzon-Frank. Rafn was inspired by the warehouses of London's dockland in designing the building's facade.

When it opened in 1924, the building was a masterpiece of its genre. It was nonetheless the subject of considerable criticism by those who felt it was an anachronistic symbol of power at a time when Functionalism was becoming the style of the times.

== Cultural references ==
- The building is used as a location in many of the Olsen-banden films, including The Olsen Gang and The Olsen Gang in a Fix (1:24:57).
- The building is also one of the main film locations in the critically acclaimed Danish-Swedish TV police crime series Bron/Broen, which was first broadcast in 2011, in which it actually "plays itself" as the Copenhagen Police Headquarters. Other Danish police crime series set in Copenhagen that regularly feature establishing shots of the building also include the acclaimed series The Killing (2007–2012). The music video for Laid Back's song "White Horse" was also mostly filmed in the courtyard of the building.

== See also ==
- Danish Police Museum
