= 1820 in Denmark =

- Decades: 1800s; 1810s; 1820s; 1830s; 1840s
- See also: Other events of 1820; List of years in Denmark

Events from the year 1820 in Denmark.

== Incumbents ==
- Monarch – Frederick VI

== Events ==
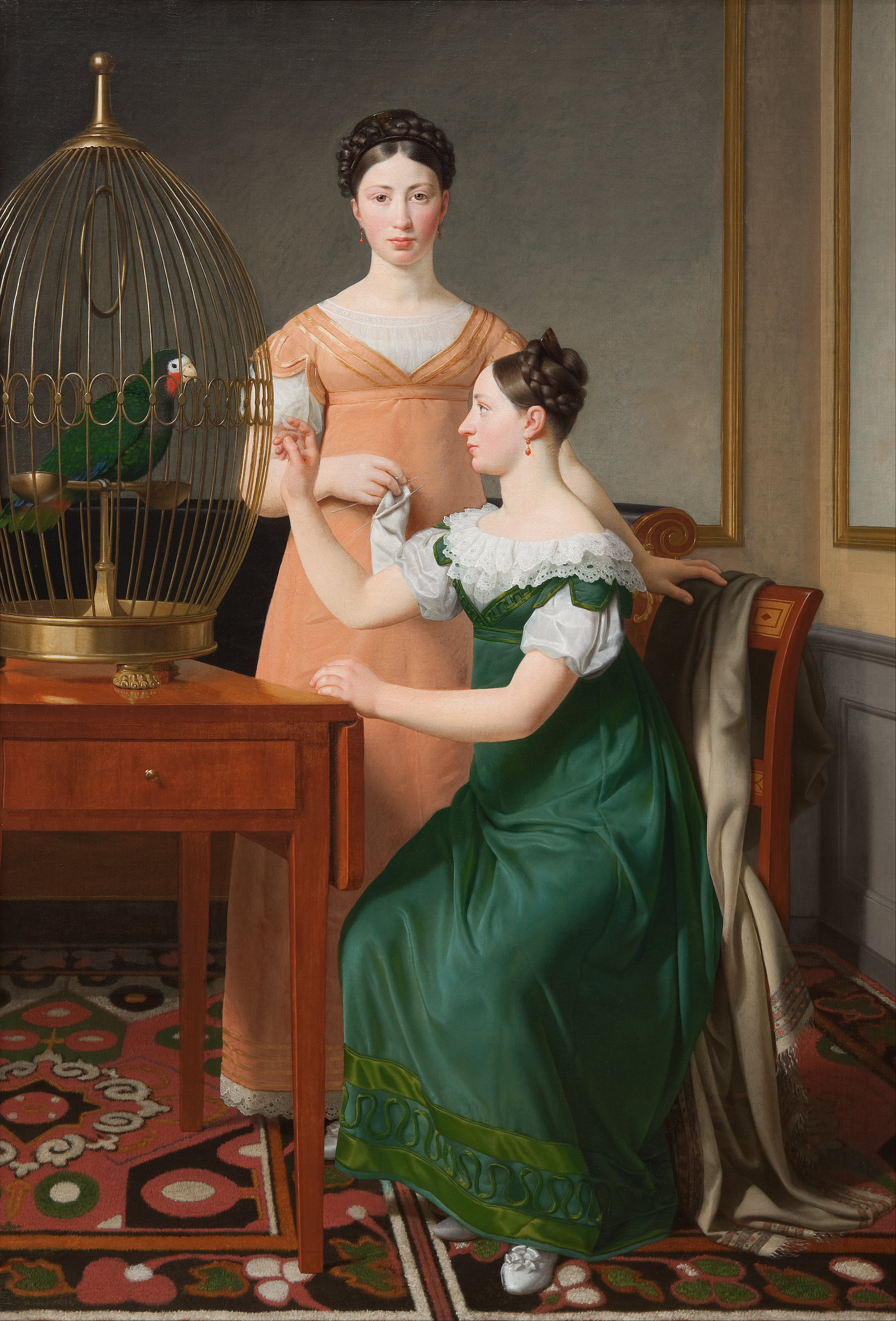
Mendel Levin Nathansons ældste døtre, Bella og Hanna, oil on canvas, 1820 by Christoffer Wilhelm Eckersberg.

- 1 May – Sparekassen for Kjøbenhavn og Omegn is established in Copenhagen.

Undated

- Bella and Hanna. The Eldest Daughters of M. L. Nathanson is painted by Christoffer Wilhelm Eckersberg

== Births ==
=== January–March ===
- 28 January – Vilhelm Pedersen, artist, illustrator (died 1859)

=== July–September ===
- 7 August – Emma Thomsen, painter (died 1897)
- 28 September – Josephine Schneider, educator and philanthropist (born 1887)
- 27 September – Vilhelm Christian Holm, composer (died 1886)

=== October–December ===
- 2 October – Georg Petersen, businessman (died 1900)
- 25 October – Lorenz Frølich, painter (died 1908)
- 25 November – Ferdinand Victor Alphons Prosch, veterinarian and biologist (died 1885)
- 26 November
  - Prince Frederick William of Hesse-Kassel (died 1884 in Germany)
  - Johan Adam Schwartz, turner (died 1874)
- 30 November – Carl Christian Vilhelm Liebe, lawyer and politician (died 1900)
- 19 May — Peter Ludvig Panum, physiologist (born 1885)

== Deaths ==
=== January–March ===
- 2 February – Peder Schall, musician and composer (born 1762)
- 1 March – Peter Christian Uldahl, piano maker (born 1779)
- 24 March – Heinrich Levetzau, county governor (born 1734)

=== April–June ===
- 13 April – Johan Ludvig Mansa, landscape architect (born 1740 in Zweibrücken)
- 0 May – Andreas Collstrop (born 1842)
- 20 April – Bertel Bjørnsen, mayor (born 1749)
- 27 May – Jean-Françoìs de Dompierre de Jonquières, merchant, landowner and amateur artist (born 1775)

=== July–September ===
- 30 July – Carl Adolph Castenschiold, landowner and chamberlain (born 1740)
- 16 August – Adam Gottlob Ferdinand Moltke, naval officer and landowner (born 1748)

=== October–December ===
- 26 December – Frederik Ludvig Bang, physician (born 1747)
