= 1821 in Denmark =

- Decades: 1800s; 1810s; 1820s; 1830s; 1840s
- See also: Other events of 1821; List of years in Denmark

Events from the year 1821 in Denmark.

== Incumbents ==
- Monarch – Frederick VI

== Culture ==
=== Art ===
- 21 May – The so-called Copenhagen Mythological Competition is announced via advertisements in several Copenhagen newspapers.

== Births ==
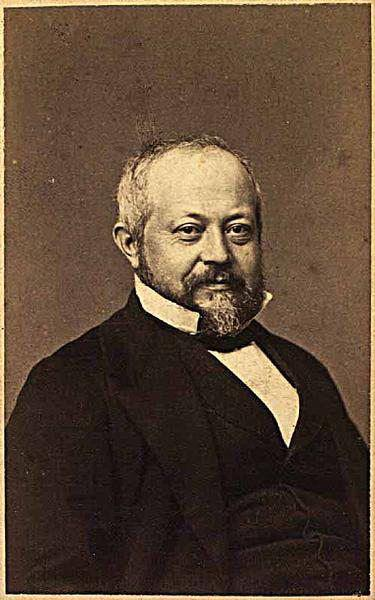
Heinrich Hansen.

- 9 June – Arent Nicolai Dragstedm goldsmith (died 1898)
- 31 July – William Hammer, painter (died 1889)
- 19 October – Axel Kittendorff, lithographer (died 1868)
- 23 November – Heinrich Hansen, painter (died 1890)

== Deaths ==
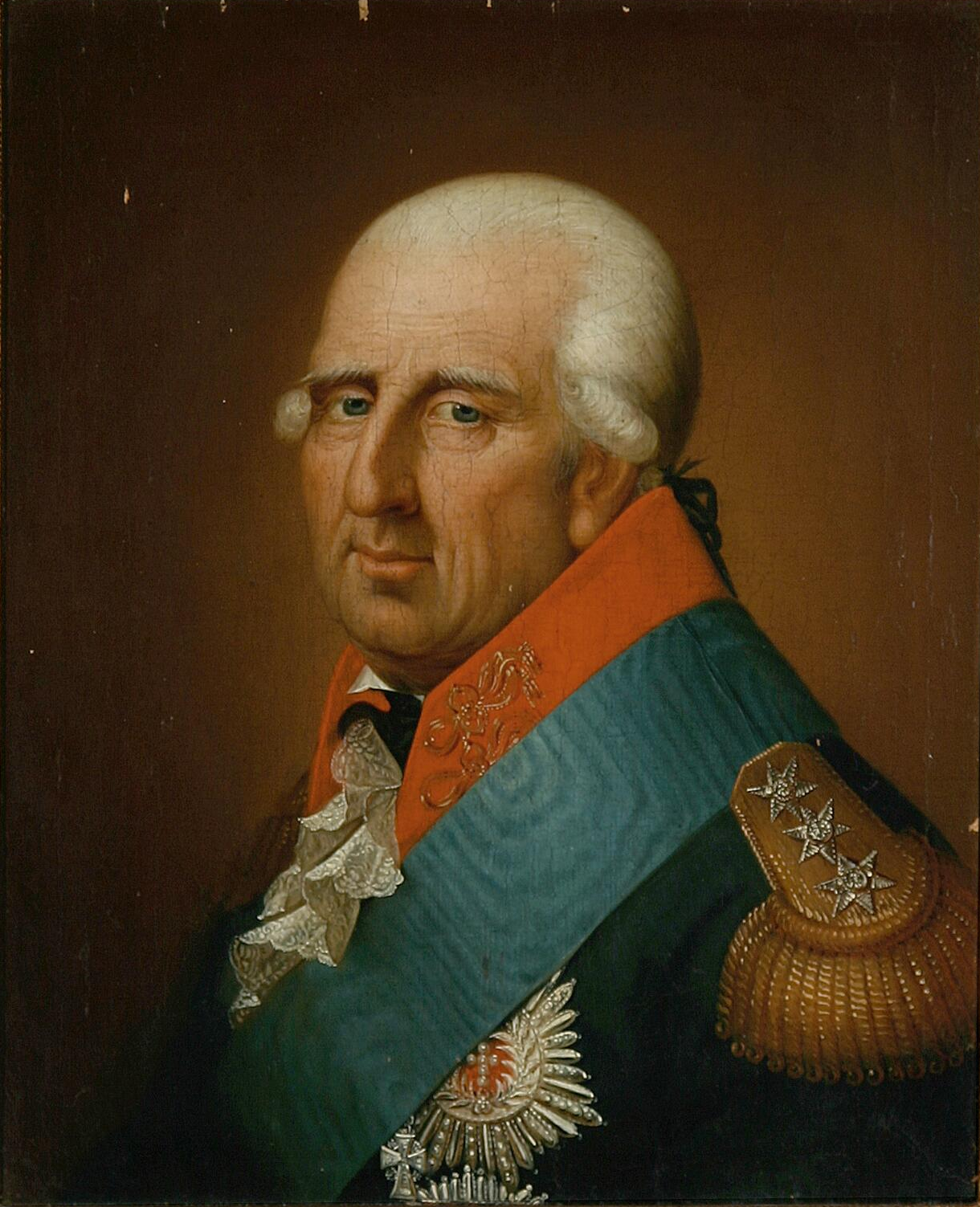
Jørgen Balthazar Winterfeldt.

- 9 February – Christian Klingberg, Supreme Court attorney (died 1765)
- 2 April – Ulrich Wilhelm de Roepstorff, colonial administrator (died 1729)
- 5 June – Andreas Henrik Stibolt, naval officer (born 1832)
- 22 July – Jørgen Balthazar Winterfeldt, naval officer and philanthropist (born 1732)
