= 1790 in Denmark =

- Decades: 1770s; 1780s; 1790s; 1800s; 1810s
- See also: Other events of 1790; List of years in Denmark

Events from the year 1790 in Denmark.

== Incumbents ==
- Monarch – Christian VII
- Prime minister – Andreas Peter Bernstorff

== Events ==
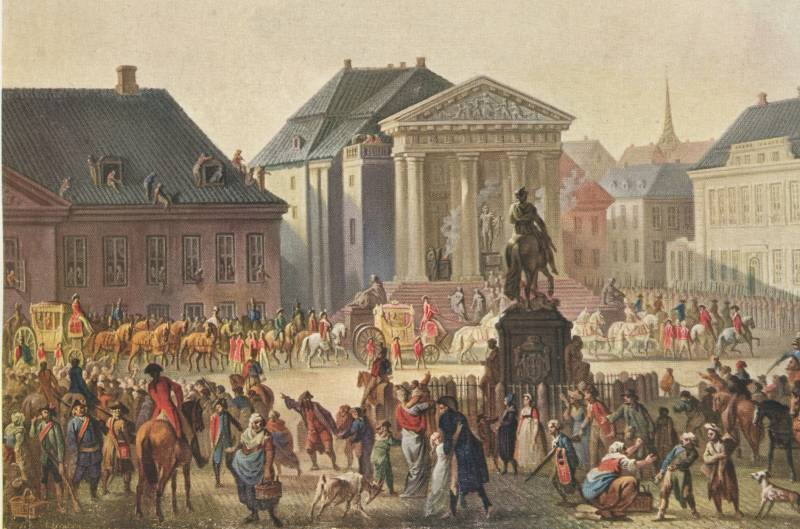
14 September: Crown Prince Frederick's and Crown Princess Marie Sophie's arrival at Copenhagen

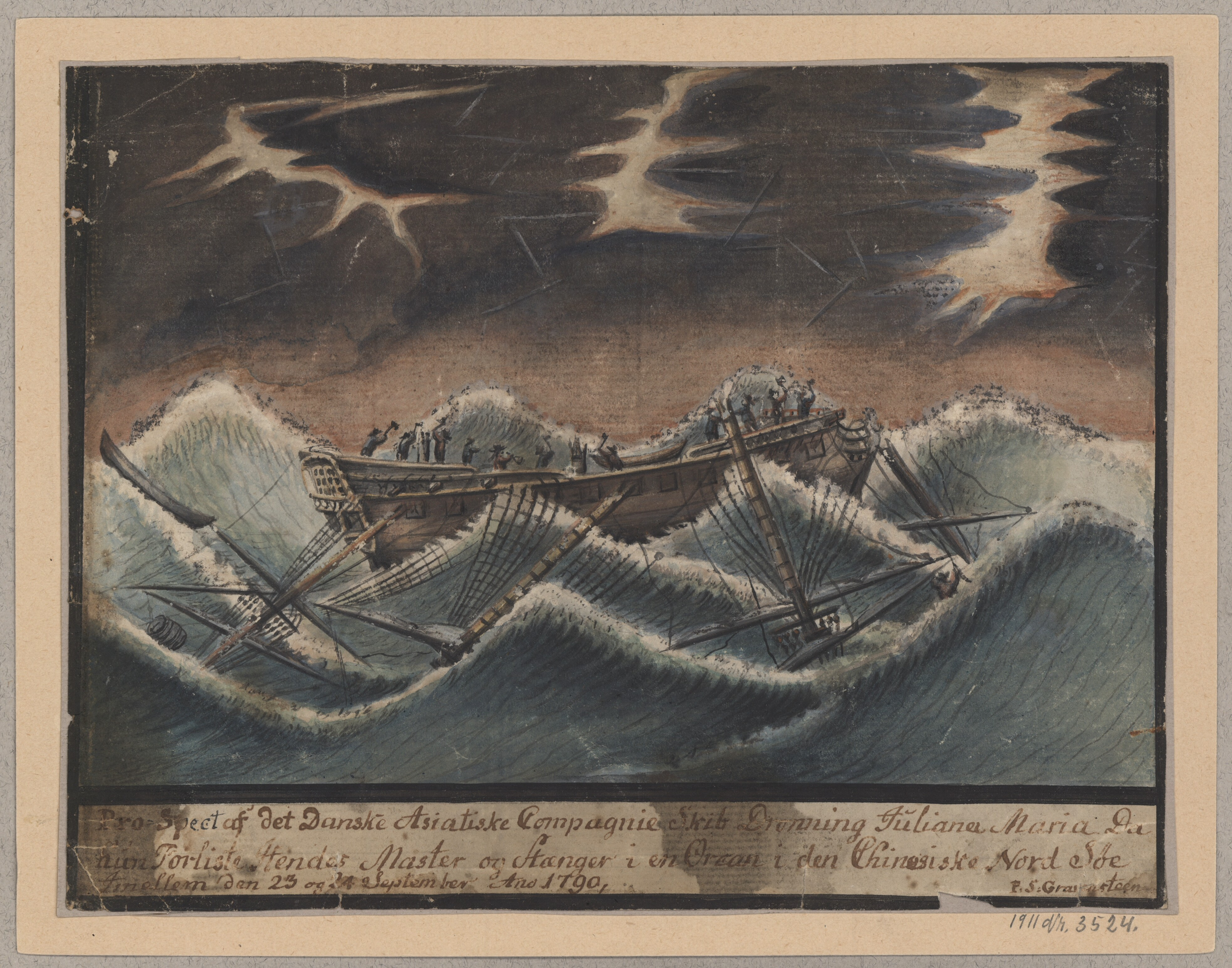
23–24 September: The DAC ship Juliane Maria.

July

- 31 July Thewedding of Frederick VI and Marie of Hesse-Kassel takes place at Fottorpf Castle.

September

- 14 September – Crown Prince Frederick and Crown Princess Marie Sophie arrives at Copenhagen.
- 23–24 September – The Danish Asiatic Company's Chinaman Juliane Maria wrecks in the Chinese Sea.

== Births ==
- 12 May – Carsten Hauch, poet (died 1872)
- 25 August – Hans Birch Dahlerup, naval officer (died 1872)
- 1 September – Ferdinand Eckstein, philosopher and playwright (died 1861 in France)
- 13 October – Benjamin Wolff, businessman, landowner and art collector (died 1866)
- 14 October – Georg Gerson, composer and banker (died 1825)

== Deaths ==
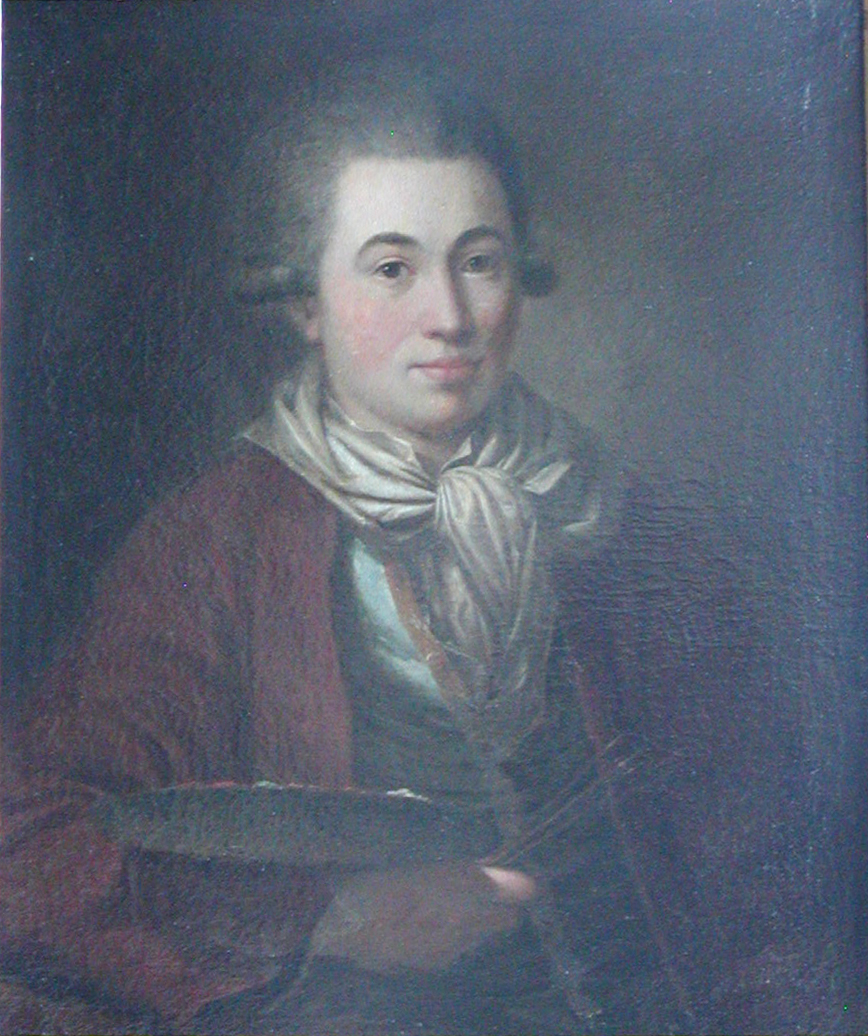
Erik Pauelsen.

- 20 February – Erik Pauelsen, painter (born 1749)
- 22 February – Frederik Wedel Jarlsberg, military officer, government official and landowner (borg 1824)
- 25 February – Daniel Ernst Bille, naval officer (born 1711)
- 7 March – Henrik Bolten, businessman and landowner born 1734 in Germany
