= 1824 in Denmark =

- Decades: 1800s; 1810s; 1820s; 1830s; 1840s
- See also: Other events of 1824; List of years in Denmark

Events from the year 1824 in Denmark.

== Incumbents ==
- Monarch – Frederick VI
- Prime minister – Otto Joachim

== Births ==
=== April–June ===
- 14 May – Vilhelm Melbye, painter (died 1992)
- 11 June – Lauritz Rasmussen, zinc and bronze caster (died 1893)

=== July–September ===
- 9 September – Svend Grundtvig, literary historian and ethnologist (died 1883)
- 23 September – Carsten Henrichsen, painter (died 1897)

=== October–December ===
- 30 October – Christen Dalsgaard, painter (died 1907)
- 26 December – Cosmus Bræstrup, chief of police (died 1870)

== Deaths ==
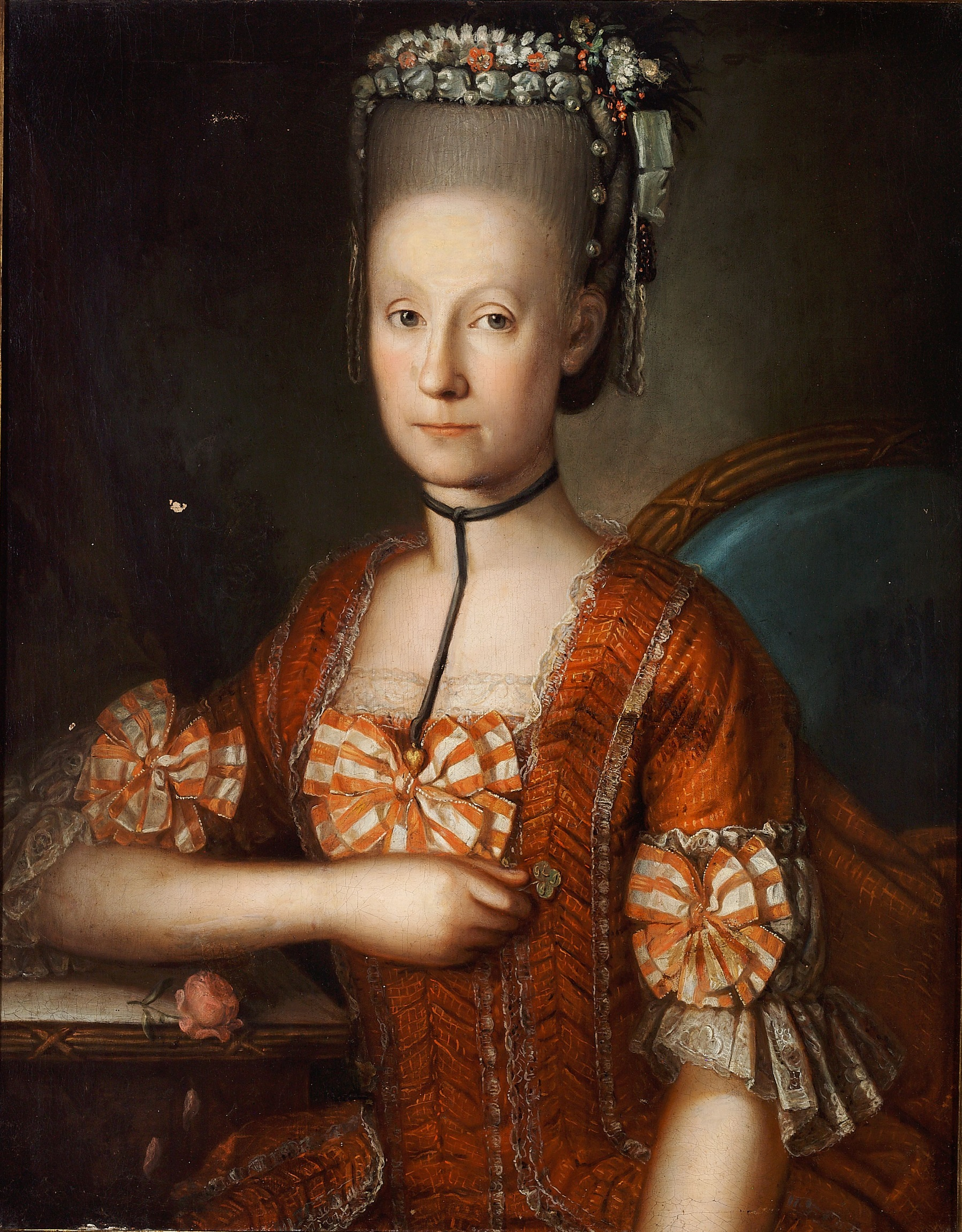
Charlotte Baden.

- 6 June – Charlotte Baden, writer (born 1740)
- 8 July – Johan Cornelius Krieger, naval officer (born 1756)
- 29 November – Luise Gramm, writer (born 1746)

=== Full date missing ===
- Peter Rabe Holm, businessman (born 1751)
