= 1825 in Denmark =

- Decades: 1800s; 1810s; 1820s; 1830s; 1840s
- See also: Other events of 1825; List of years in Denmark

Events from the year 1825 in Denmark.

== Incumbents ==
- Monarch – Frederick VI
- Prime minister – Otto Joachim

== Events ==
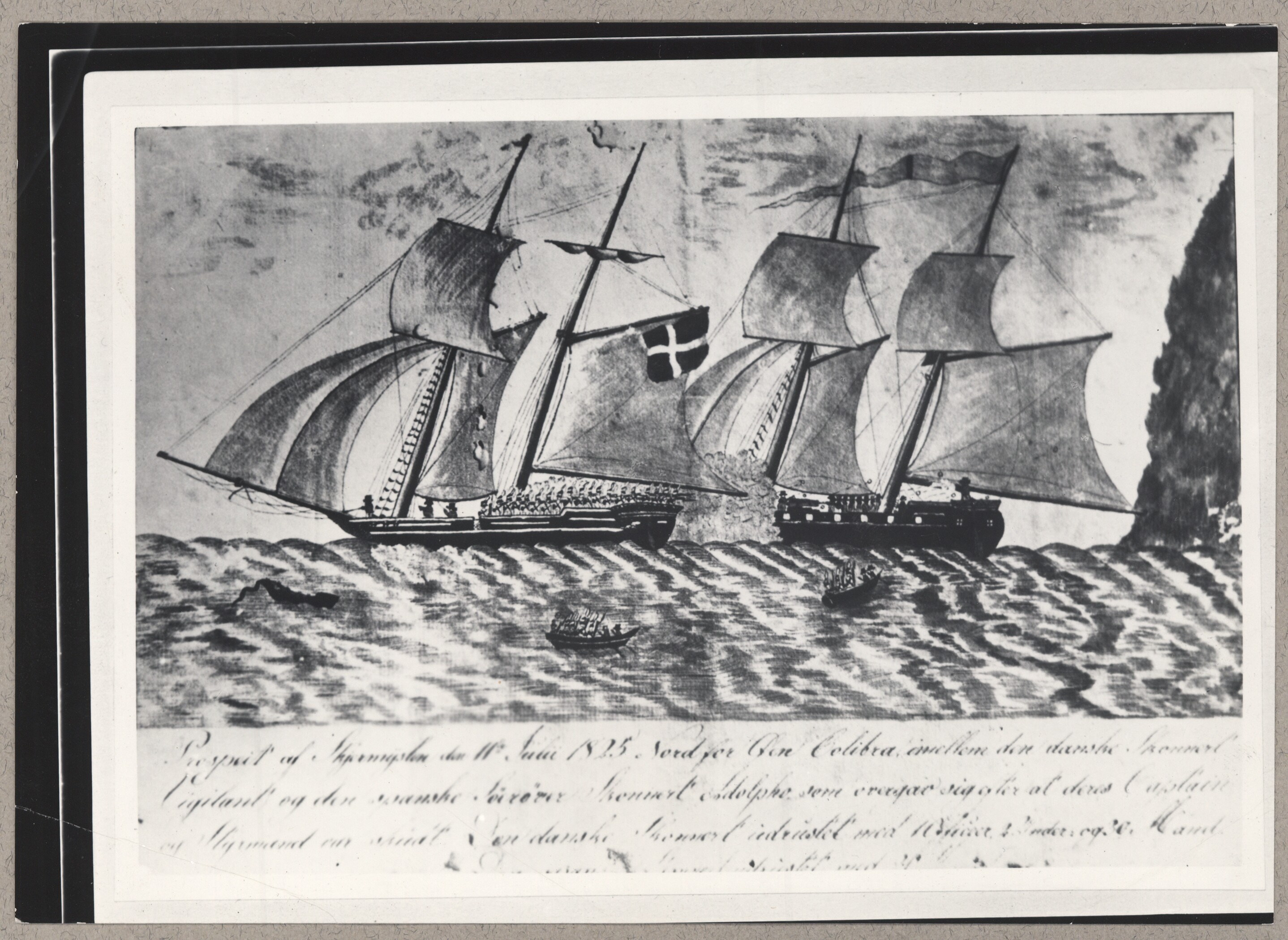
11 July: Vigiliant captures Adolpho.

- 11 July – The Danish schooner Vigilant captures the Spanish privateering schooner Adolpho north of Colibra in the West Indies.

=== Undated ===
- - A storm penetrates the narrow land mass, Agger Tange, separating Northern Jutland from the mainland Jutland for the first time since the 12th century.
- The Copenhagen Art Society is founded by a circle of the most influential figures of the Danish art world during the Danish Golden Age.

== Culture ==
=== Art ===
- Martinus Rørbye paints the View from the Artist's Window in his parents' home at Amaliegade 45.
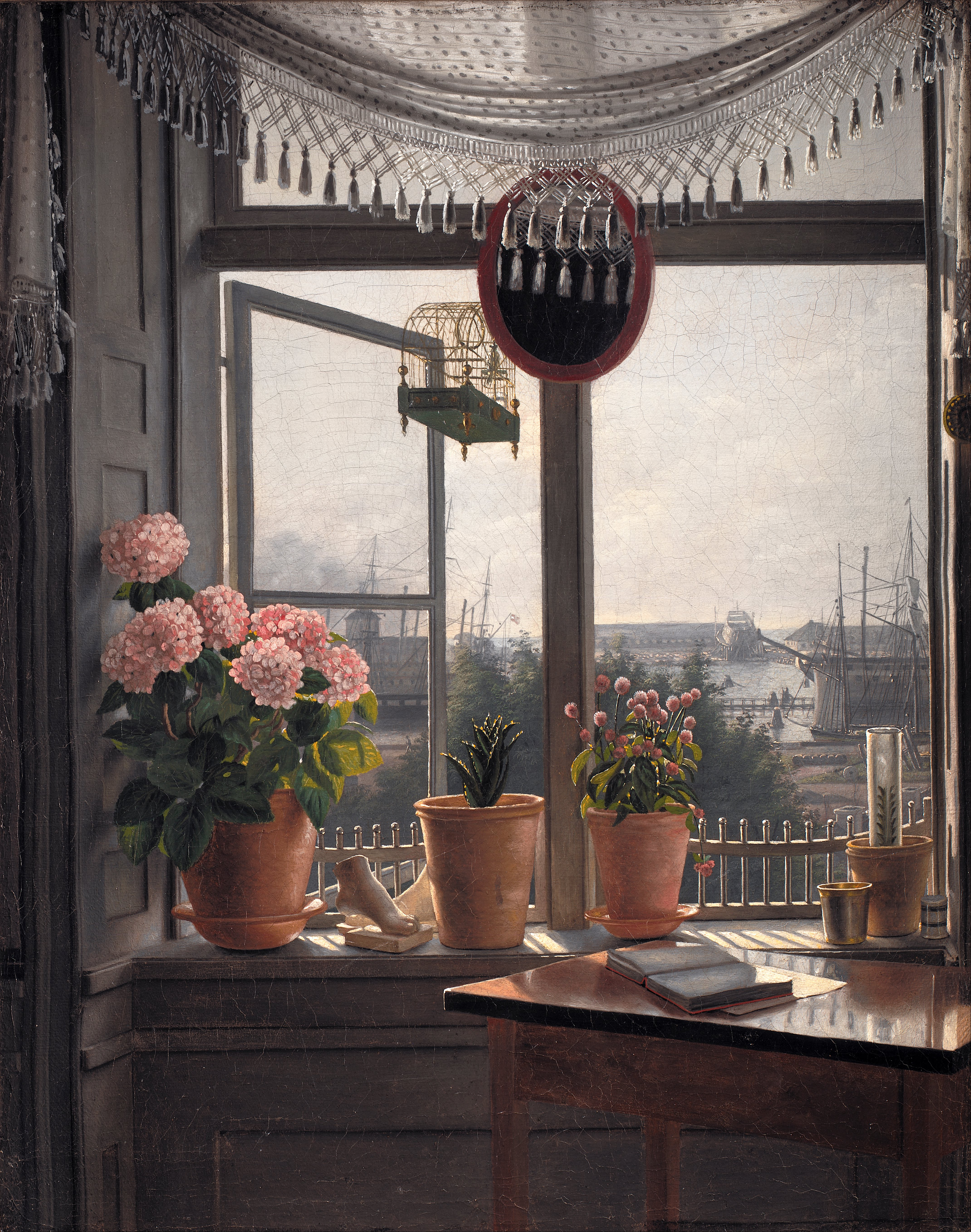
Martinus Rørbye: View from the Artist's Window

== Births ==
=== January–March ===
- 28 January – Moses Melchior, businessman (died 1912)

=== April–June ===
- 16 April – Jacob Brønnum Scavenius Estrup, politician, prime minister of Denmark (died 1913)
- 10 May – Heinrich Tønnies, photographer (died 1903)
- 20 May – Carl Christian Amussen, Utah's first jeweler (died 1902)

=== October–December ===
- 16 October – Anders Peter Westenholz, businessman and consul-general (died 1886)
- 19 November – Jacob Kornerup, archeologist (died 1913)
- 30 November – Julius Exner, painter (died 1910)
- 24 November – Herman Løvenskiold, county governor (born 1783)

== Deaths ==
=== January–March ===
- 4 January – Johan Peter Wleugel, naval officer and cartographer (born 1736 in Norway)
- 16 February – Georg Gerson, composer and banker (born 1790)

=== April–June ===
- 8 April – Carl Ferdinand Degen, mathematician (born 1766 in Germany)
- 19 May – Peter Hersleb Classen, statesman (born 1738 in Norway)

=== July–September ===
- 20 August – Adolph Tobias Herbst, naval officer (born 1746)

=== October–December ===
- 21 November – Daniel Gotthilf Moldenhawer, philologist, theologian, librarian, bibliophile, palaeographer, diplomat, and Bible translato (born (born in 1835 in Prussia)
- 30 December – Peter Grønland, composer (born 1761)
