= Georg Christian Freund =

Danish sculptor (1821–1900)

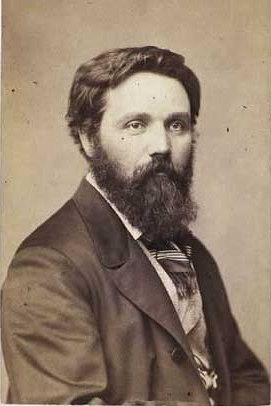
1870s photograph of Freund by Budtz Müller (Königlichen Bibliothek in Kopenhagen).

Georg Christian Freund (7 February 1821 – 6 April 1900) was a Danish sculptor, most notable for works such as The Bowls Player.

== Life ==
Born in Altona, Hamburg, he learned sculpture at the Royal Danish Academy of Fine Arts under his uncle Hermann Ernst Freund and also under Herman Wilhelm Bissen. He was already working independently by 1840, when he was working on the Ragnarok frieze for the Christiansborg Palace. He was given several medals and prizes early in his career. From 1854 to 1865 he stayed in Rome on a state stipend and in 1869 became a member of the Copenhagen Academy. In 1892 he became a professor and in 1898 was made a knight of the Order of Dannebrog. He died in Copenhagen in 1900.

== Works ==
He mainly produced genre works in marble, plaster and bronze. Some of them are to be found in the Alte Nationalgalerie in Berlin, whilst others are still in the public buildings for which they were commissioned. Two examples of the latter are his marble reliefs of The Last Supper and The Baptism of Christ in the Jordan in the St Nicholai Kirche in Uthlede.
