= 1823 in Denmark =

- Decades: 1800s; 1810s; 1820s; 1830s; 1840s
- See also: Other events of 1823; List of years in Denmark

Events from the year 1823 in Denmark.

== Incumbents ==
- Monarch – Frederick VI

== Events ==
Undated

- Rønne Theater is established on Bornholm

== Births ==
=== April–June ===
- 16 April – Ludvig Gade, dancer and mime (died 1897)
- 19 April – Edvard Jünger, precision mechanic (died 1899)
- 22 April – Line Luplau, women's right activist and suffragist (died 1891)
- 12 May – Frederik Vermehren, painter (died 1910)
- 23 May – Christopher Puggaard, geologist (died 1864)

=== July–September ===
- 19 July – Julie Sødring, actress (died 1894)
- 7 August – August Saabye, sculptor (died 1916)
- 15 September – Emanuel Larsen, marine painter (died 1859)

=== October–December ===
- 30 October – Auguste Sophie Friederike, princess of Hesse-Cassel (died 1889)
- 4 December – Alfred Benzon, pharmacist and industrialist (died 1884)

== Deaths ==
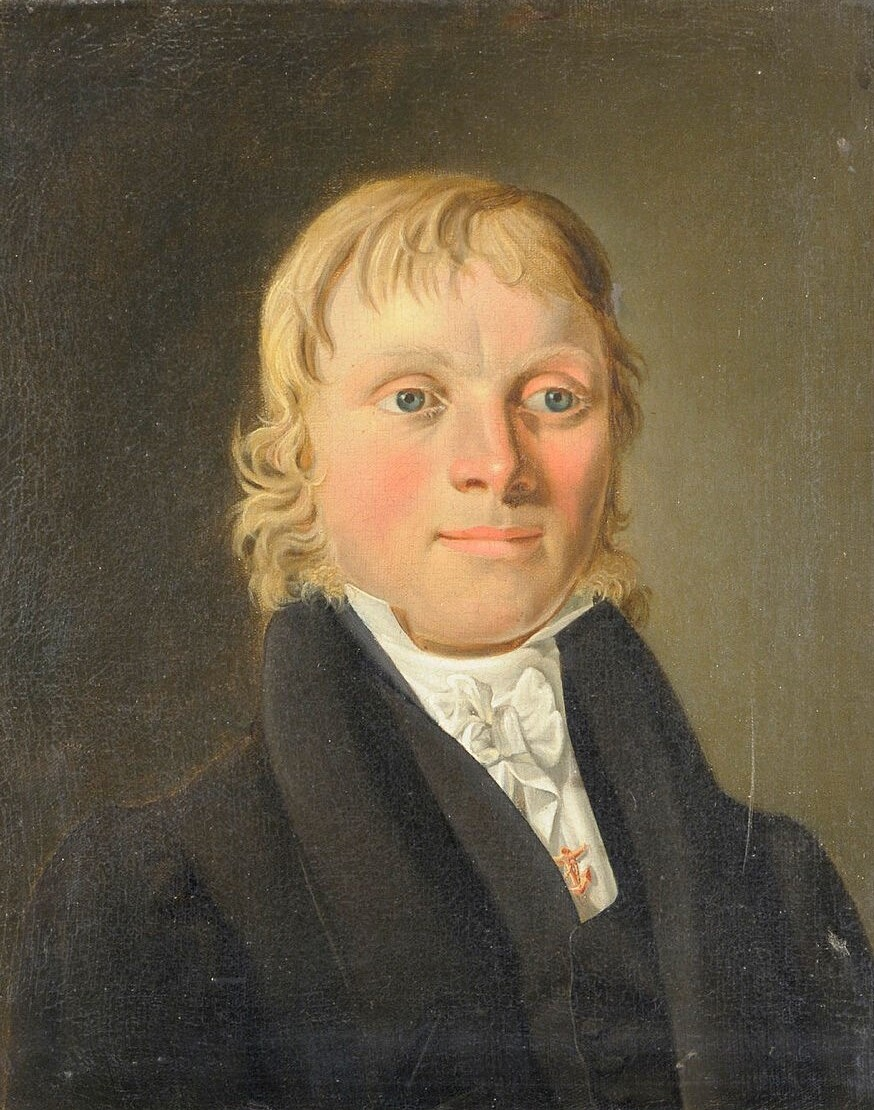
Carl Wilhelm Jessen,

=== January–March ===
- 28 January – Ernst Peymann, army officer (born 1737)
- 30 March – Carl Wilhelm Jessen, naval officer (born 1764)

=== April–June ===
- 21 April – Peter Collett (writer), judge (born 1767)
- 30 April – Peter Atke Castberg, physician (born 1779)
- 29 May – * Amalie Sophie Holstein, noble and courtier (born 1748)
- 6 June
  - Christian Conrad, Count of Danneskiold-Samsøe, councillor, board member, landowner and magistrate (born 1774) -
  - Lars Lassen, landowner (born 1761
