= Hermann Ernst Freund =

Danish sculptor (1786–1840)

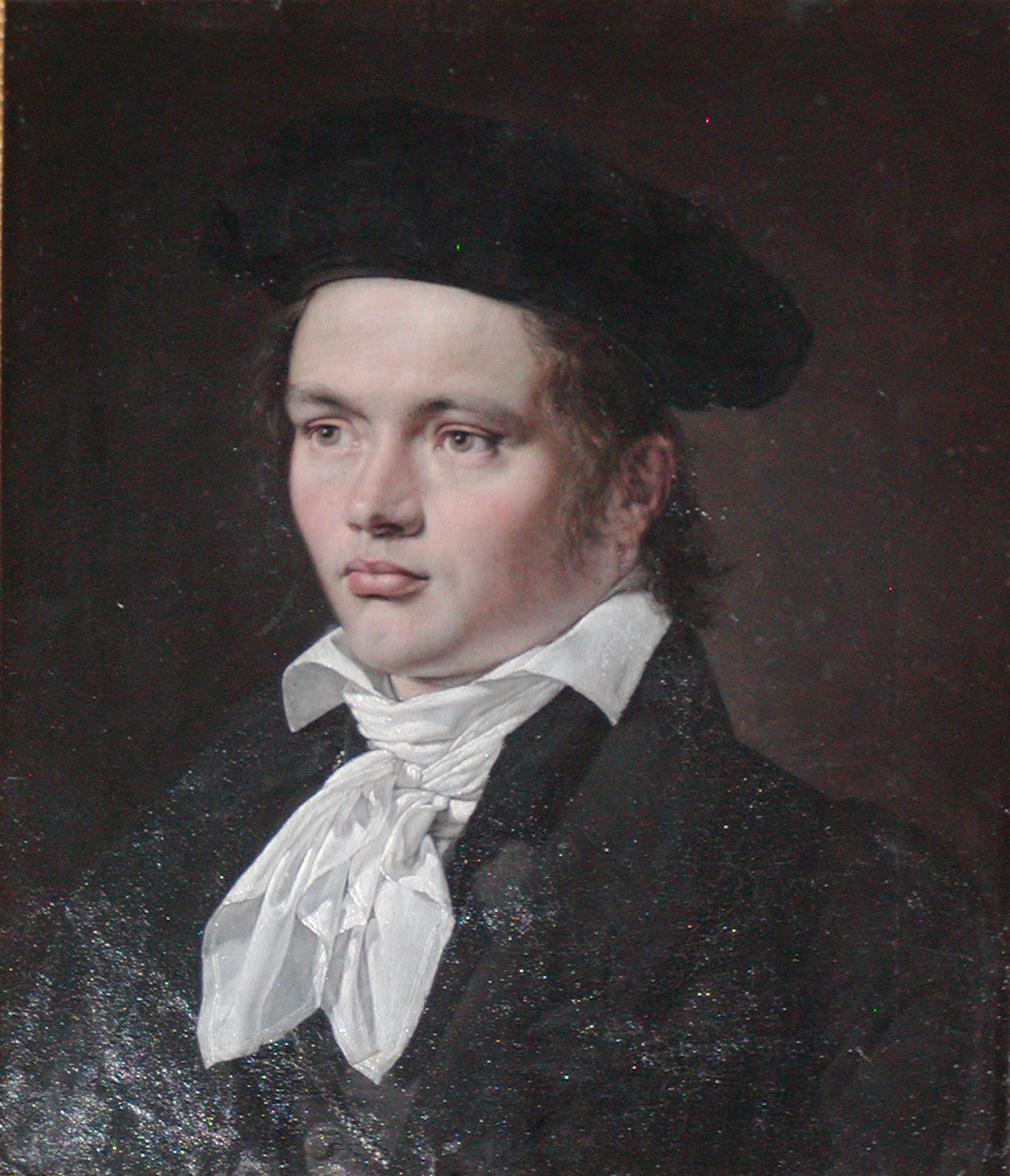
- Portrait of Freund by Christian Albrecht Jensen (1818–20)
- Born: 15 October 1786; Uthlede, near Bremen, Holy Roman Empire
- Died: 30 June 1840 (aged 53); Copenhagen, Denmark
- Resting place: Assistens Cemetery, Copenhagen
- Education: Royal Danish Academy of Fine Arts
- Known for: Sculpture
- Movement: Danish Golden Age, Neoclassicism

Hermann Ernst Freund (15 October 1786 – 30 June 1840) was a German-born Danish sculptor of the Danish Golden Age. Trained at the Royal Danish Academy of Fine Arts, he spent about a decade in Rome as one of Bertel Thorvaldsen’s closest collaborators before becoming professor of sculpture in Copenhagen. Freund is particularly known for his sculptures inspired by Nordic mythology, including a series of statuettes of Norse gods, the large Ragnarok frieze designed for Christiansborg Palace and a number of grave monuments and portrait busts in a refined classical style.

== Biography ==
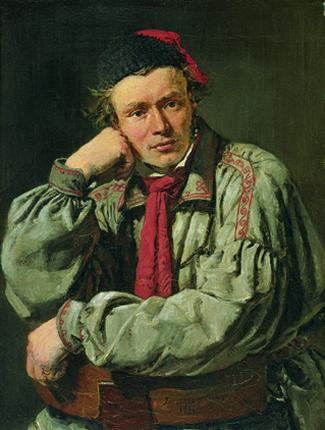
Hermann Ernst Freund portrayed by Christian Albrecht Jensen, 1835, Ny Carlsberg Glyptotek

Freund was born in Uthlede near Bremen in the Holy Roman Empire. Originally trained as a smith, he later turned to engraving and gem carving before entering the Royal Danish Academy of Fine Arts in Copenhagen in 1805. He applied for and obtained Danish citizenship in 1811 and completed his studies with the Academy’s major travel scholarship, which enabled him to continue his training in Italy.

=== Roman period and Nordic themes ===
Freund arrived in Rome in 1818 and worked there for around ten years in Bertel Thorvaldsen’s studio, where he assisted on large sculptural commissions destined for Christiansborg and the Church of Our Lady in Copenhagen. Despite the close collaboration, his own work gradually took a different direction, combining classical form with subjects drawn from Nordic myth.

In Rome he modelled a series of works based on Norse deities, including statuettes of Loki (c. 1822), Odin (model 1825–1827, cast in bronze 1827) and Thor (Academy presentation piece, 1829). In 1822 he won first prize in a Copenhagen competition for compositions on Nordic mythological themes with the relief Mimir and Balder Consult the Norns, later acquired by the Ny Carlsberg Glyptotek. These works made Freund one of the earliest Danish sculptors to develop a systematic sculptural imagery based on Nordic mythology, which contemporary critics associated with emerging currents of romantic nationalism.

=== Return to Copenhagen and the Ragnarok frieze ===
Freund returned to Copenhagen in 1828. Among the commissions he pursued on his return was an extensive frieze with scenes from the Ragnarok myth cycle, designed for the interior of Christiansborg Palace and begun while he was still in Rome. The ambitious project occupied him for many years but was not completed in his lifetime. A reduced version of the Ragnarok frieze was finally installed at Christiansborg in 1841, after Freund’s death, and completed by his pupils and colleagues Herman Wilhelm Bissen and Georg Christian Freund. The work was destroyed in the fire that consumed Christiansborg in 1884, although parts of the composition could later be reconstructed on the basis of surviving casts and drawings. A plaster cast of a section of the frieze is held by the Statens Museum for Kunst.

Freund also prepared models for figures of the twelve apostles for the Church of Our Lady in Copenhagen, although the final commission for the church’s sculptural decoration went to Thorvaldsen.

=== Professor and later work ===
In 1829 Freund was appointed professor of sculpture at the Royal Danish Academy of Fine Arts, a position he held until his death in 1840. His official residence, the historic property Materialgården in central Copenhagen, was converted by Freund into a kind of Gesamtkunstwerk: rooms, furniture and household objects were designed in a consistent Pompeian style, inspired by excavations he had seen in Herculaneum and Pompeii. The decorative painting and much of the interior program were carried out in collaboration with younger artists such as Georg Hilker, Heinrich Eddelien, Constantin Hansen and Christen Købke.

During the 1830s, when large state commissions were relatively few, Freund earned much of his living from decorative works and from gravestones and memorial monuments, several of them for churches and churchyards on the Danish island of Funen, including the baptismal font and a grave monument in Faaborg Church and memorials in Odense. His gravestones and grave reliefs are characterised in contemporary and later descriptions as technically precise works in a classical idiom, while his portrait busts were praised for their close characterisation of the sitter.

Freund died in Copenhagen on 30 June 1840 and was buried at Assistens Cemetery. The largest single collection of his sculptures, including many of his mythological works and portrait pieces, is held by the Ny Carlsberg Glyptotek in Copenhagen.

== Gallery ==
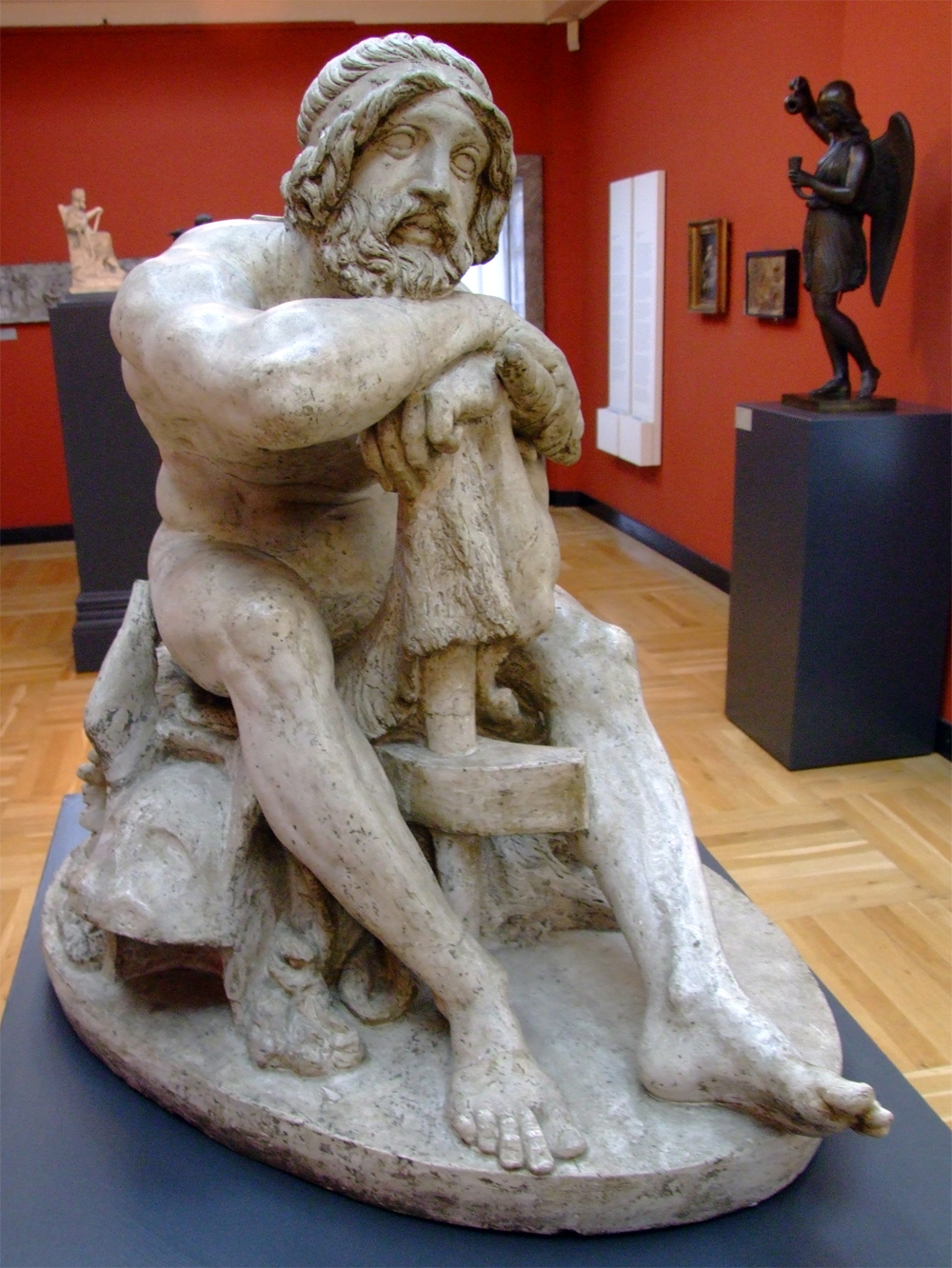
Thor (1829), marble statuette

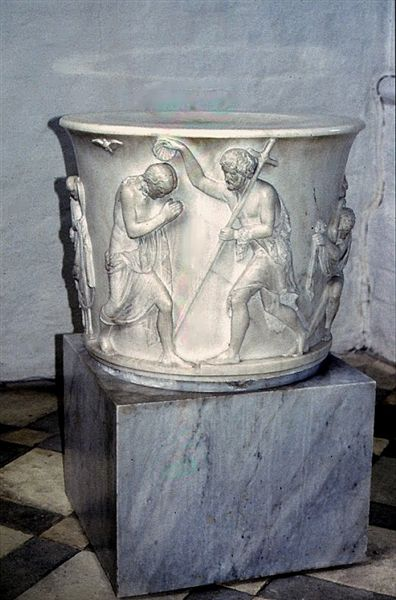
Baptismal font in Faaborg Church

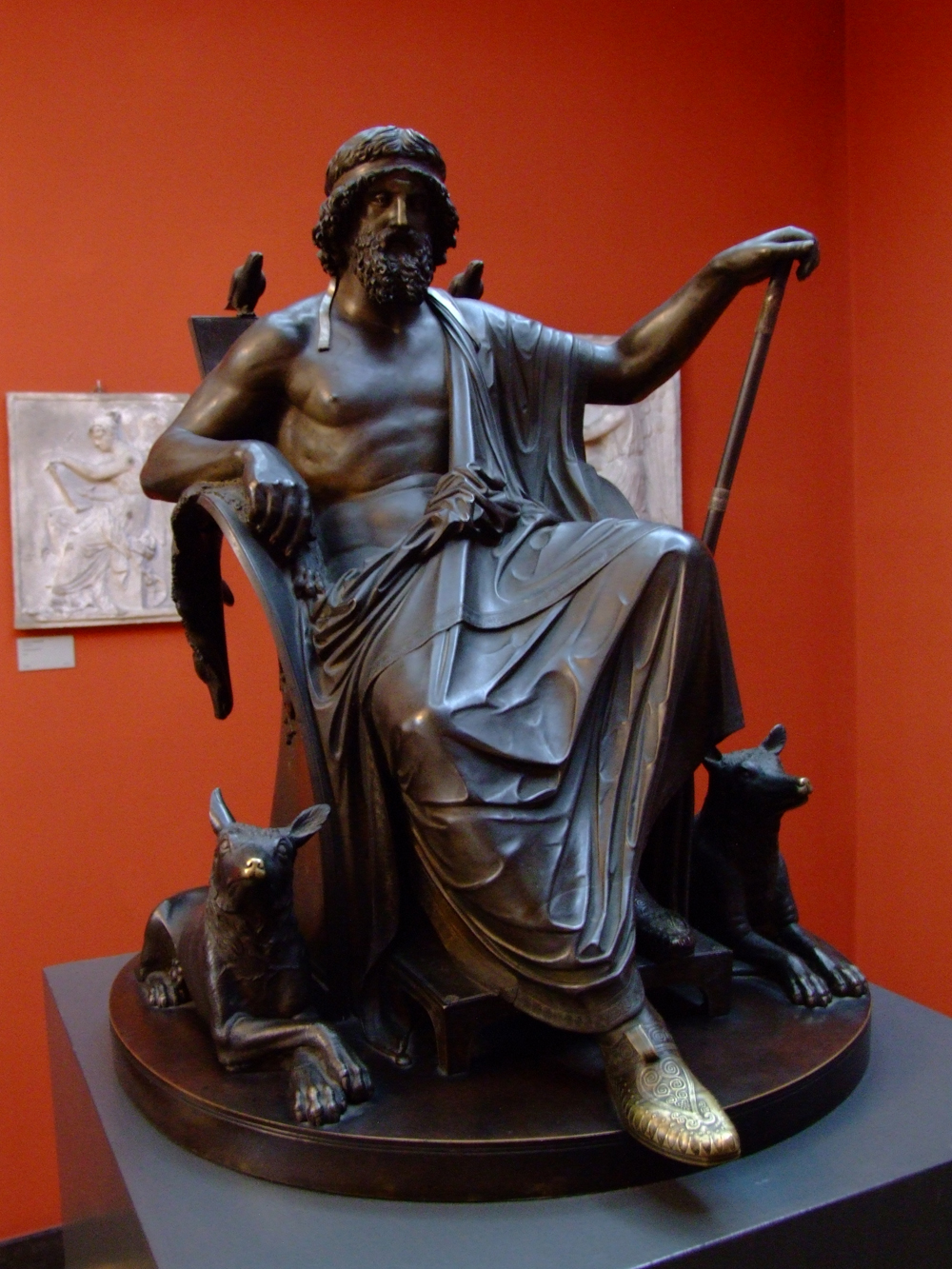
Odin (model c. 1825–1827, bronze 1827)

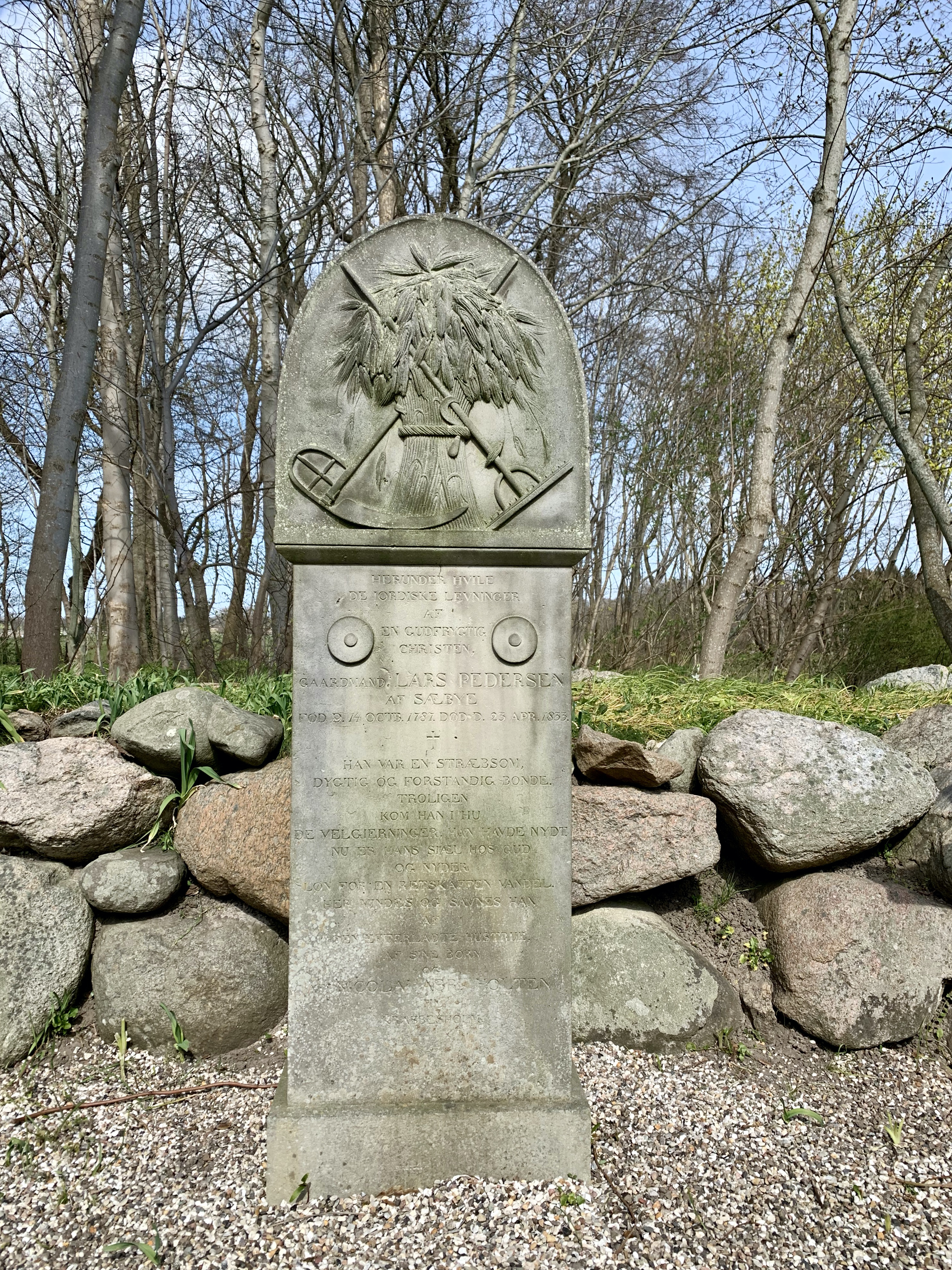
Memorial for Jens Pedersen at Sæby Church, Hornsherred (1833)

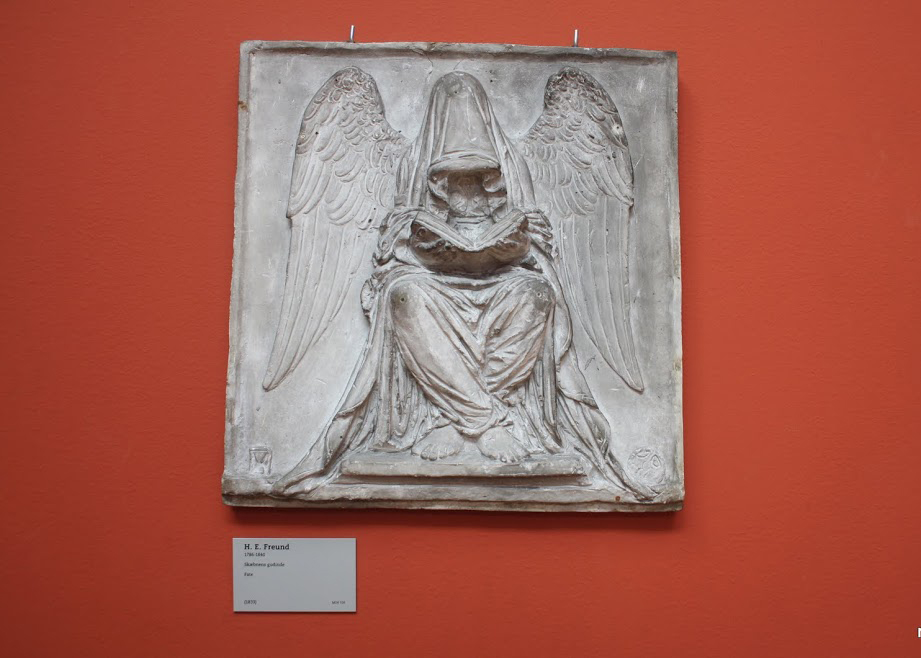
Skæbnens gudinde (Fate), sculpture by Hermann Ernst Freund at the Ny Carlsberg Glyptotek

== See also ==
- Danish sculpture
- Mimir and Balder Consult the Norns
