= The Bowls Player =

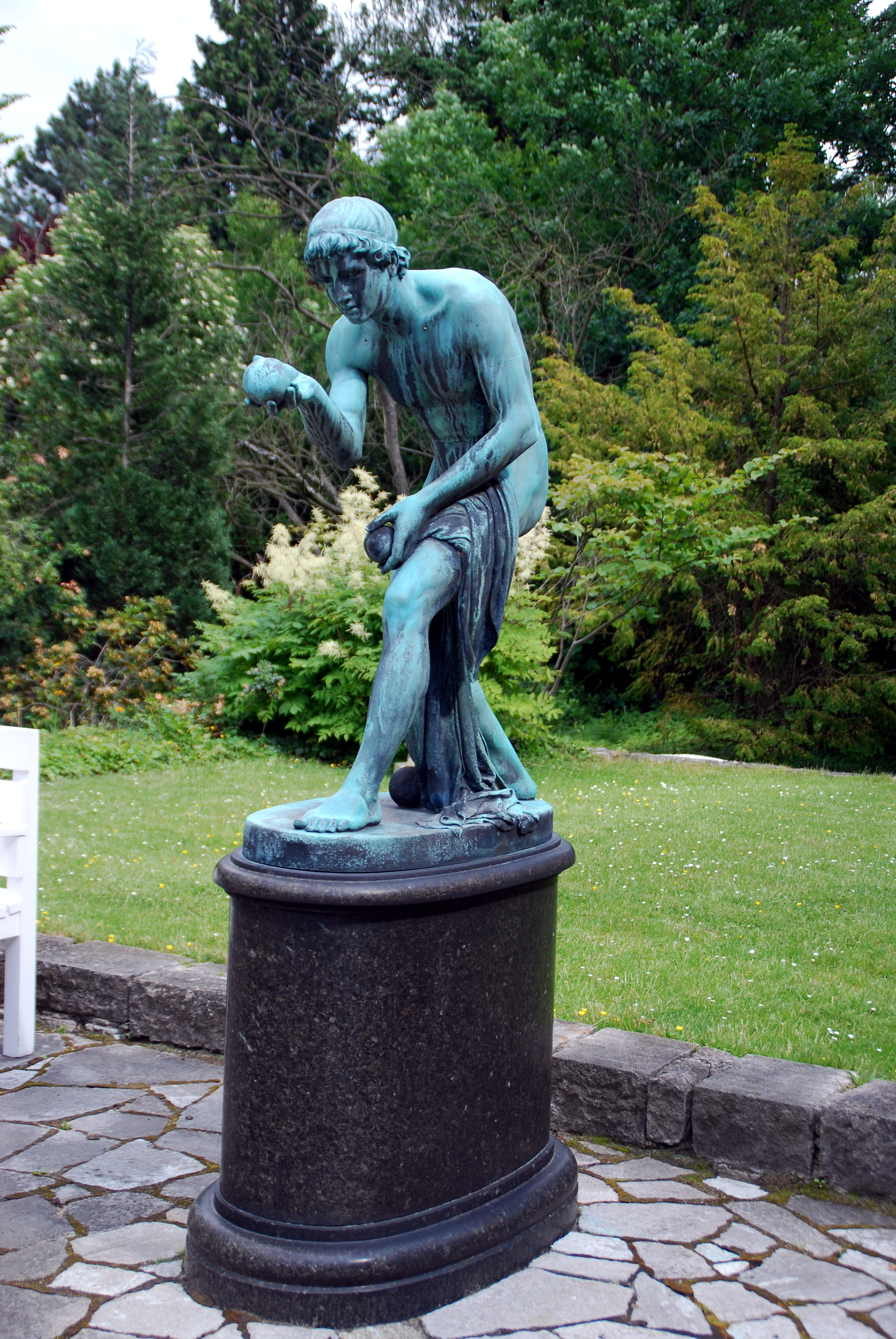
- The Berlin cast.
- Artist: Georg Christian Freund
- Year: 1857
- Medium: Bronze sculpture
- 52.46041°N 13.30007°E

The Bowls Player is an 1857 bronze statue by the Danish sculptor Georg Christian Freund. It is a modern adaptation of classical sculptures of athletes such as Polykleitos's Doryphoros and Myron's Discobolus.

The plaster model for the work and the first casting from it were lost in the fire which destroyed the Christiansborg Palace in Copenhagen in 1884. Three other casts are known to survive:

- Ny Carlsberg Glyptotek, Copenhagen
- National Gallery of Denmark, Copenhagen
- Alte Nationalgalerie, Berlin - previously owned by the archaeologist Theodor Wiegand and now on long-term loan to his house in Berlin-Dahlem, where it is displayed on the terrace as it was during Wiegand's lifetime

== Bibliography (in German) ==
- Wolfram Hoepfner, Fritz Neumeyer (editors): Das Haus Wiegand von Peter Behrens in Berlin-Dahlem. Baugeschichte und Kunstgegenstände eines herrschaftlichen Wohnhauses, Philipp von Zabern, Mainz 2004, ISBN 3-8053-0399-8 (Das Deutsche Archäologische Institut. Geschichte und Dokumente, Band 6), S. 138–139, Nr. 36.
- Martin Maischberger: Von Konstantinopel nach Berlin: Theodor Wiegands Sammlung antiker Kunst in der Dahlemer Villa, In: Klaus Rheidt, Barbara Anna Lutz (editors): Peter Behrens, Theodor Wiegand und die Villa in Dahlem, Philipp von Zabern, Mainz 2004, ISBN 3-8053-3374-9, S. 57–82, 187.
