= Winterfeldts Stiftelse =

Coordinates: 55.68683°N 12.58337°E

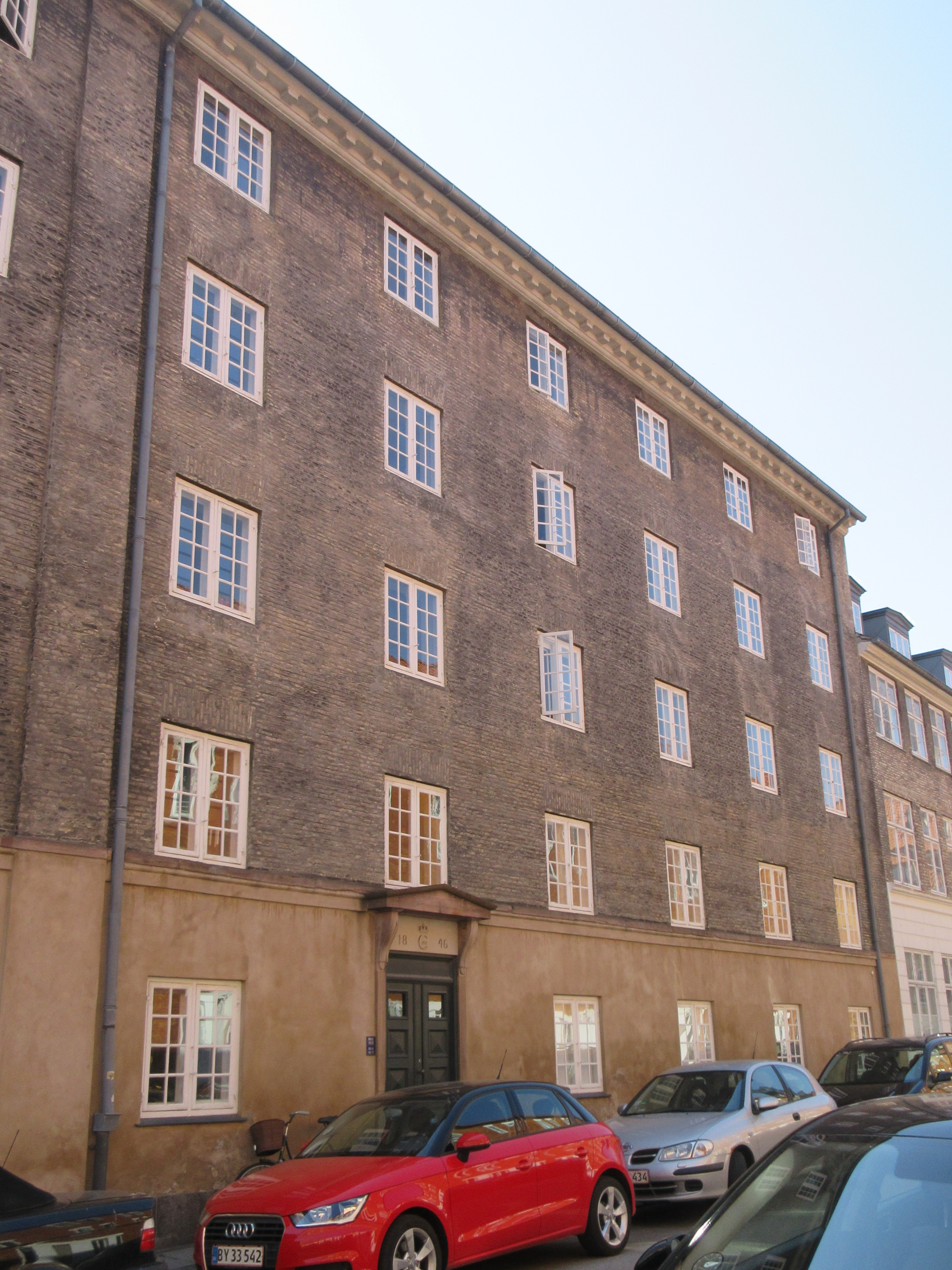
Klerkegade 25B

Winterfeldts Stiftelse is a charitable housing complex located at Klerkegade 25-29 in central Copenhagen, Denmark.

== History ==
Winterfeldts Stiftelse was established by Jørgen Balthazar Winterfeldt in 1805 to provide affordable housing for widows and unmarried women. The first building was located at Hindegade 9 (then Hoppenslænge). The charity was renamed Trøstens Bolig on 8 August 1812. The easternmost part of the building on Klerkegade (13 bays) was built in 1838. The western part of the building (six bays) was built in 1846-1847.

The building at Hindegade 9 was replaced by a new building designed by Jens Ingwersen in 1909-10.

== Architecture ==
The building on Klerkegade is five storeys tall and 19 bays long. It is built in red brick. The courtyard was refurbished by landscape architect Lone van Deurs (born 1944) in 1992.
