= 1822 in Denmark =

- Decades: 1800s; 1810s; 1820s; 1830s; 1840s
- See also: Other events of 1822; List of years in Denmark

Events from the year 1822 in Denmark.

== Incumbents ==
- Monarch – Frederick VI

== Events ==
- 28 February – Spare- og Laanekassen i Marstal, a savings bank on the island of Ørø, is founded by a group of local residents.

== Culture ==
=== Music ===
- Carl Nielsen's Wind Quintet is performed in public for the first time.

== Births ==
- 6 April – August Ferdinand Michael van Mehren, philologist (died 1907)
- 24 April – Henrik August Flindt, gardener and landscape architect (died 1901)
- 17 June – Erik Bøgh, journalist, playwright and songwriter (died 1899)
- 4 July – Vilhelm Christesen, silver smith (died 1899)
- 2 August – Ida Marie Bille, court member (died 1902)
- 15 August – Carl Frederik Blixen-Finecke, politician and nobleman (died 1873 in Germany)

=== Date unknown ===
- Georg Grothe, composer (died 1876)

== Deaths ==
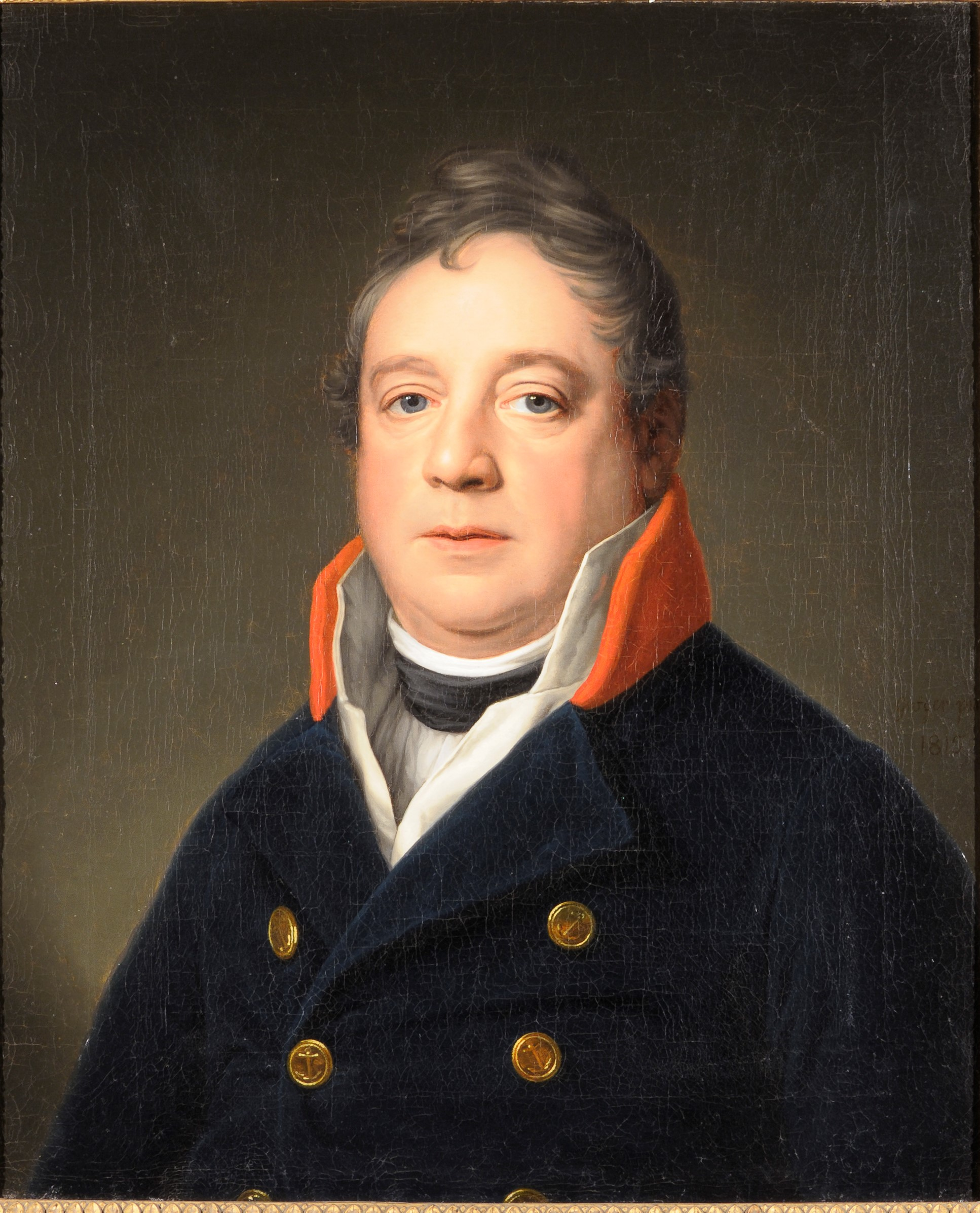
John Christmas,

- 6 January – John Christmas, businessman (born 1757 in England)
- 15 January – Otto Himmelstrup Hvidberg, chief of police (died 1771)
- 10 March – Carl Wivel, restaurateur (born 1844)
- 4 May – Hedevig Johanne Bagger, businesswoman (born 1740)
- 20 May – Otto Fabricius, missionary, naturalist, ethnographer and explorer (born 1744)
- 25 September – Erik Viborg, veterinarian and botanist (born 1759)
