= Jørgen Balthazar Winterfeldt =

Danish naval officer (1732–1821)

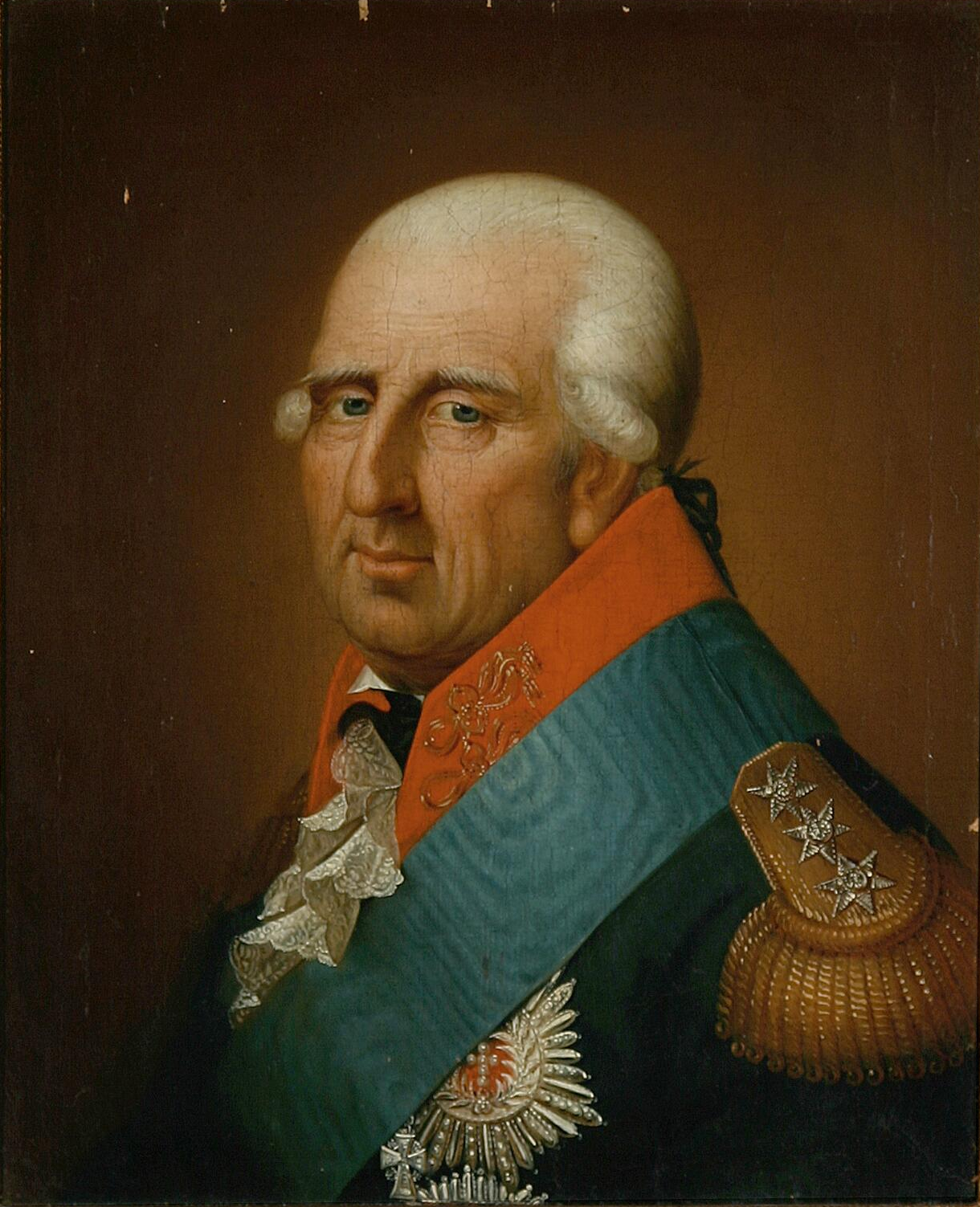
Jørgen Balthazar Winterfeldt.

Jørgen Balthazar Winterfeldt (1 October 1732 – 22 July 1821) was a Danish naval officer and philanthropist. He was admiral from 1804 and was awarded the Order of the Elephant in 1811. He established Winterfeldts Stiftelse at Klerkegade 25 in Copenhagen in 1805. He was chief of the Naval Cadet Academy from 1782 until 1792.

== Early life ==
Winterfeldt was born in Fredericia, the son of lieutenant ved Erik Winterfeldt (1697-1741) and Nille Winterfeldt née Dalhoff (1701-52).

== Career ==
Winterfeldt served as page for Countess Reventlow, Duchess of Plön, in 1742 and became a cadet in 1743, Ge became a second lieutenant in 1753. In 1755-56, he served onboard the frigate Christiansborg on a voyage to the Danish West Indies. In 1757, he served on Nellebladet as part of a Danish-Swedish squadron in the North Sea. He became a first lieutenant in 1757 and a captain lieutenant in 1760. He served as second-in-command on the frigate Vildanden in 1760.

In 1761-62, he served aboard the naval ship Grønland which transported Carsten Niebuhr's expedition to the Levant. In 1762-63, he served as commander of the guard ship station at Nyborg.

In 1765, he served as second-in-command aboard St. Croix which was sent to Bergen in connection with the tension that resulted from the extra taxes and the division of the division of larger farms.

He became a captain and adjudant at the Admiralty for C. C. Danneskiold-Laurvig in 1767. In 1772, he was freed from duty in the Navy to guard Queen Caroline Mathilde but she was ultimately sent to Calle.

He became a captain commander in 1778. In 1779, he commanded the ship Indfødsretten on a voyage to Nordkap. He headed the Naval Cadet Academy in Copenhagen from 1781 to 1792. He became a commander in 1789, a counter admiral in 1796, vice admiral in 1799 and admiral in 1804.

== Personal life ==
Winterfeldt married Maria Magdalene le Sage de Fontenay (ft. 23 March 1746 - 2 July 1820) on 19 April 1782 in the Holmen Church in Copenhagen. She was a daughter of commander Benjamin le Sage de Fontenay (1695-1749) and Maria Tigh (They) (1719-95). Winterfeldt and his wife had no children. They established Trøstens Bolig as a home for widows and unmarried women in 1805 as well as Den Winterfeldt- Vossiske stiftelse in Fredensborg. He was an honorary member of the Royal Danish Academy of Science. In 1812 the king charged him with writing the history of the Royal Danish Navy.

Winterfeldt died on 22 July 1821. He is buried in the Cemetery of Holmen in Copenhagen.
