= Bella and Hanna. The Eldest Daughters of M. L. Nathanson =

Painting by Christoffer Wilhelm Eckersberg

- Bella og Hanna. M. L. Nathansons ældste døtre (Danish)
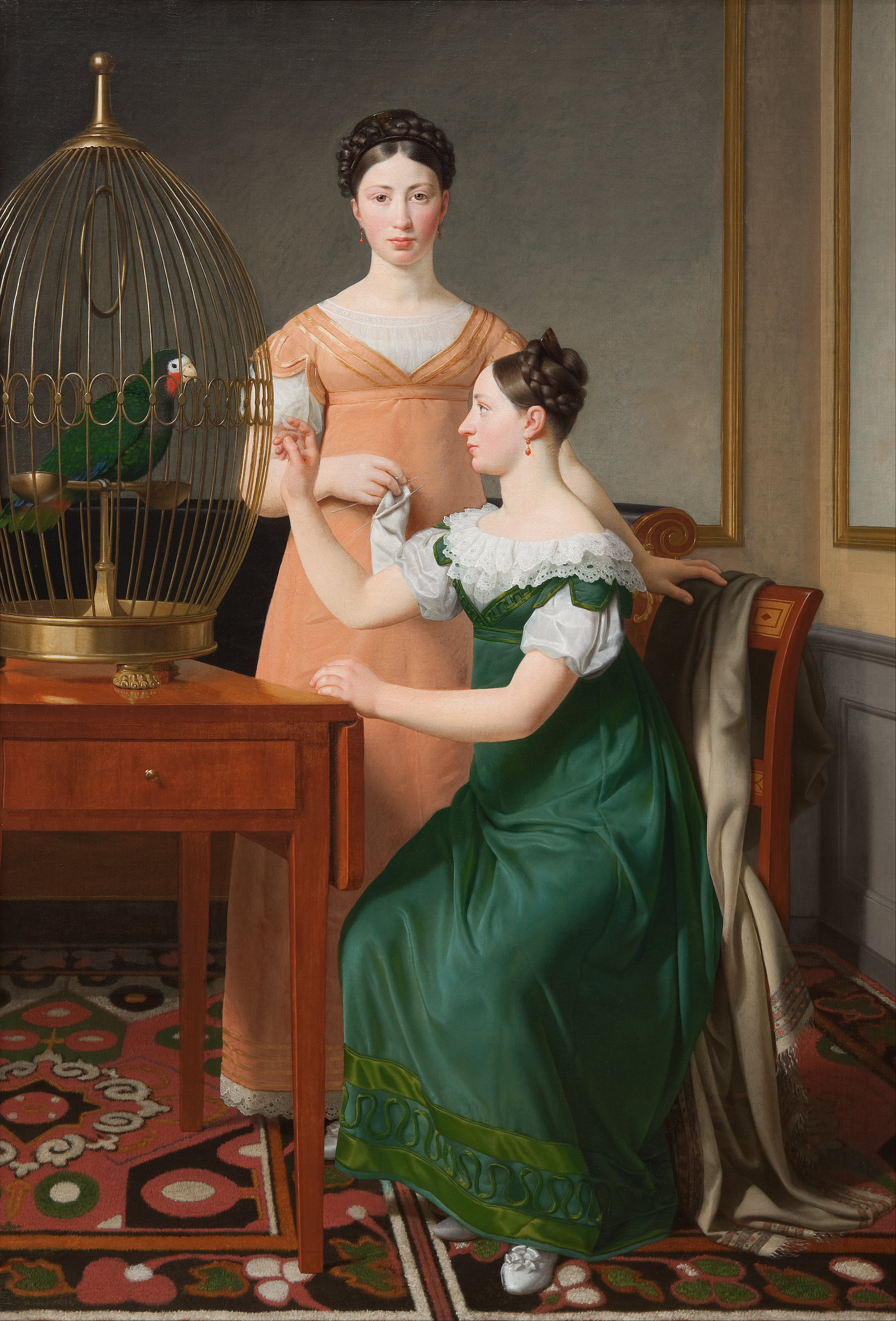
- Artist: C. W. Eckersberg
- Year: 1820
- Medium: Oil on canvas
- Location: National Gallery of Denmark, Copenhagen

Bella and Hanna. The Eldest Daughters of M. L. Nathanson is a painting by the Danish painter C. W. Eckersberg. It was painted in 1820.

A busy portrait painter, Eckersberg received a commission from Mendel Levin Nathanson to paint two large family portraits. Eckersberg painted the two daughters in two different poses but made them appear strikingly similar, like two variations on a theme. The parrot in the cage may symbolize the longing of the daughters to move from a sheltered home and out into real life.

== History ==
Around 1820 Eckersberg painted many portraits for the wealthy bourgeoisie of Copenhagen. The merchant Mendel Levin Nathanson, who had supported him early in his career, also ordered two paintings from him. Nathanson was a leading man within the Copenhagen Jewish community. He campaigned for equal rights for the Jews, but also gave a significant portion of his wealth to charity for the poor part of the Jewish population. At the end of his life he published an important book on the history of Judaism in Denmark. Thus, although Nathanson remained true to his faith throughout his life, his children, with his consent, converted to Christianity.
