= Ferdinand Eckstein =

Danish philosopher and playwright

Ferdinand Eckstein (1 September 1790 – 25 November 1861), Baron d'Eckstein, was a philosopher and playwright.

== Biography ==
He was born in Copenhagen as the son of Jean Ferdinand Eckstein a German Jew who had converted to Lutheran Christianity. Eckstein converted to Catholicism in Rome in 1807 under the influence of Friedrich Schlegel, and settled in France, after Napoleon's defeat. He worked from 1815 to 1830 as a police-inspector, and was an advocate of religious and civil liberty.

Eckstein was an Orientalist who believed that the study of Eastern texts and languages was the most important intellectual pursuit of his time. Nicknamed "Baron Sanskrit", he thought that God's revelation in its purest form could be found in the texts of ancient India.

Eckstein worked with Nodier, Hugo, Abel de Rémusat, Chateaubriand, Alexandre Guiraud and Delphine Gay in various literary enterprises and founded his own newspaper, The Catholic (1826-9), where he advocated basing of metaphysics in history supported by linguistics, philology and mythography.

== Works ==
- Der Kampf um Pisa. Ein Trauerspiel. Heidelberg: Mohr & Zimmer, 1813.
- Le Catholique. Ouvrage Périodique, dans Lequel on Traite de l'Universalité des Connaissances Humaines sous le Point de Vue de l'Unité de Doctrine, 16 vols., 1826–1829.
- Recherches Historiques sur l'Humanité Primitive. Théogonies et Religions des Anciens Âges. Paris: Martinet, 1848.
- Geschichtliches Über Askesis der Alten Heidnischen und der alten Jüdischen Welt als Einleitung einer Geschichte der Askesis des Christlichen Mönchthums vom Baron von Eckstein. Mit einem Vorworte von Joh. Jos. Ign. von Döllinger. Freiburg im Breisgau: Herder, 1862.

== Bibliography ==
- Berthiot, François (1998). Le Baron d'Eckstein, Journaliste et Critique Littéraire. Paris: Éditions des Écrivains.
- Burtin, Nicolas (1931). Le Baron d'Eckstein. Paris: E. de Boccard.
- Herders Conversationslexikon. Freiburg im Breisgau 1854, Bd. 2, 493.
- Le Guillou, Louis (1998). Lettres Inédites du Baron d'Eckstein. Société et Littérature à Paris en 1838-40. Paris: Presses Universitaires de France.
- Le Guillou, Louis (2003). Le Baron d'Eckstein et ses Contemporains. Paris: Honoré Champion.
- McCalla, Arthur (1998). A Romantic Historiosophy: The Philosophy of History of Pierre-Simon Ballanche. Leiden, Boston, Koln: Brill, p. 277–81.
- McCalla, Arthur (1998). "The Structure of French Romantic Histories of Religions," Numen, Vol. 45, Fasc. 3, pp. 258–286.
