= Carsten Henrichsen =

Danish landscape painter

Carsten Henrichsen (23 September 1824 - 30 April -1897) was a Danish landscape painter.

== Biography ==
Henrichsen was born into a working-class family in Copenhagen in 1824. He attended the Royal Danish Academy of Fine Arts in Copenhagen for plaster modeling from March 1840 until March 1843, but was absent in January 1845; he received drawing instruction from Frederik Ferdinand Helsted from 1845–1849.

From the late 1840s, he created vast number of paintings from Copenhagen and North Zealand. He received the Neuhausen Award in 1855 and a grant from the Academy in 1858.

== Selected works ==
- Broen over Stadsgraven ved Nørreport (1848, Øregaard Museum)
- Udsigt fra Fortunen over Bernstorff mod Gentofte og København (1853)
- Prospekt af Roskilde med Domkirken (1857, Frederiksborg Museum)
- Amagerport (1860, Museum of Copenhagen)
- Ved Frihedsstøtten (c. 1860, Museum of Copenhagen)
- Strandgade, Sandvig (1872, Bornholms Kunstmuseum)
- Kobberdammen ved Hellebæk (1878, Aarhus Kunstmuseum, Roskilde Museum, Vejle Kunstmuseum)

== Image gallery ==
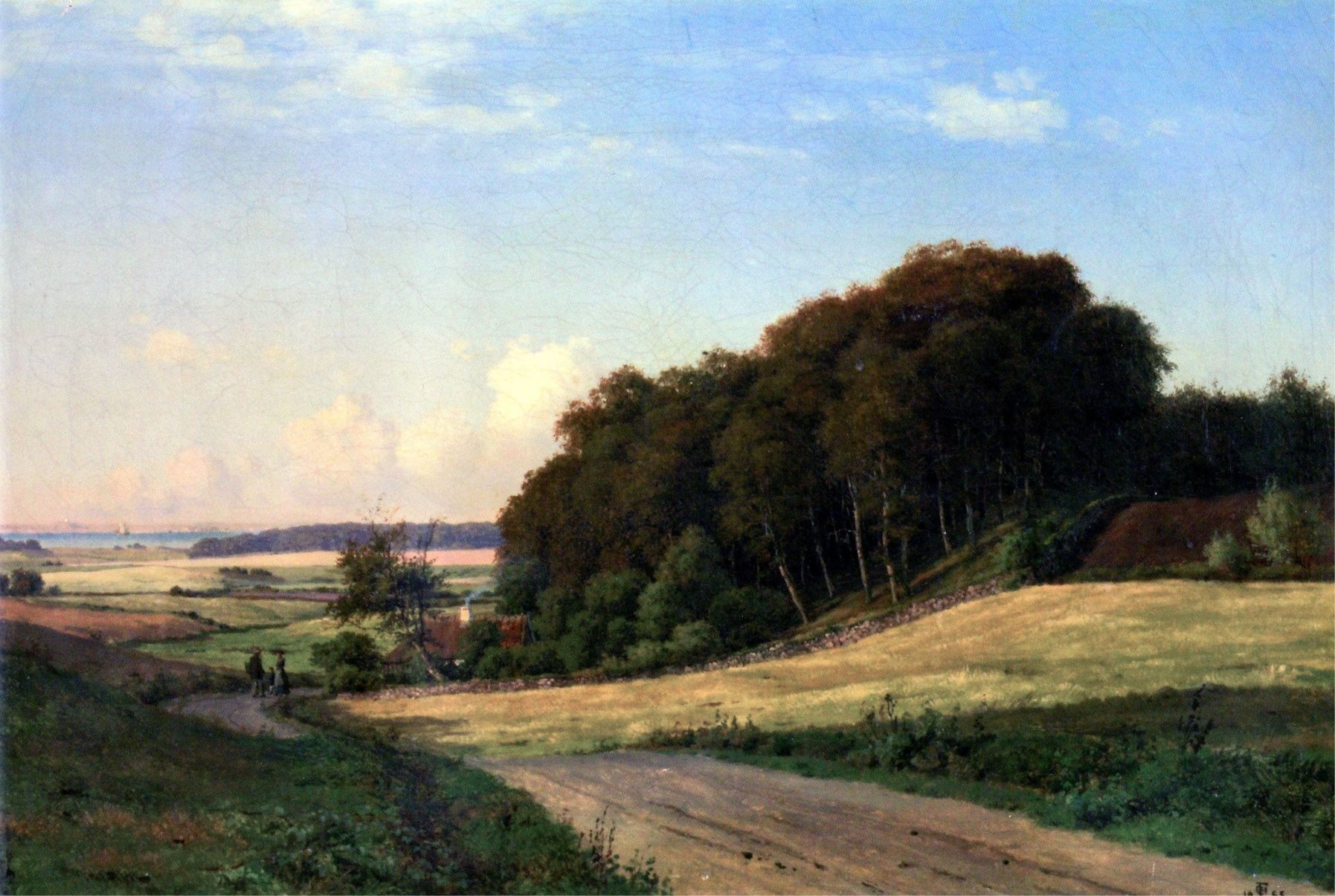
View of the Øresund from Trørød (1855)

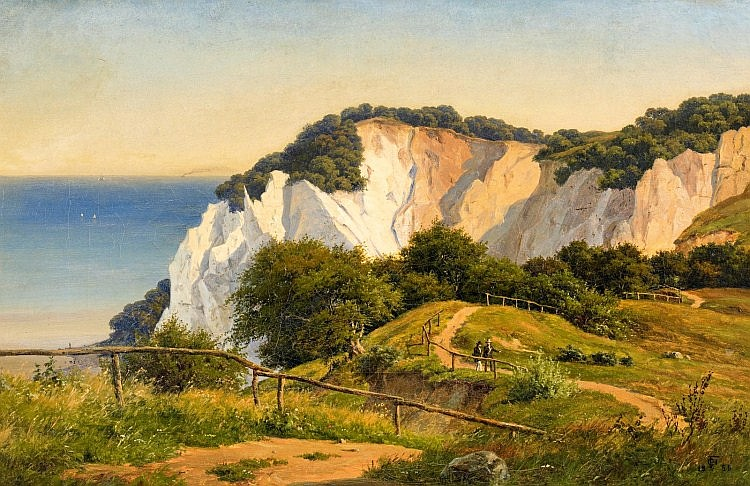
Summerday at Møns Klint (1855)

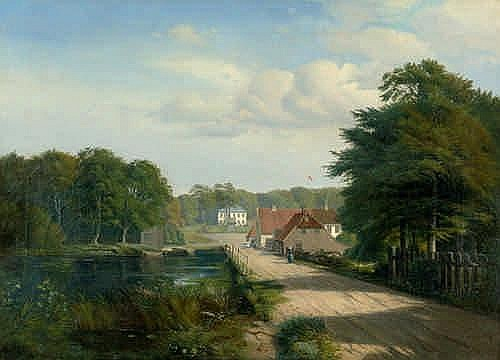
Raadvad

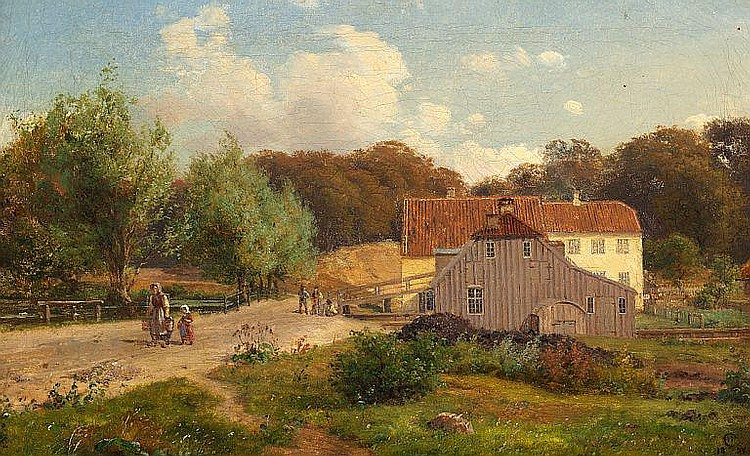
View of Strandmøllen

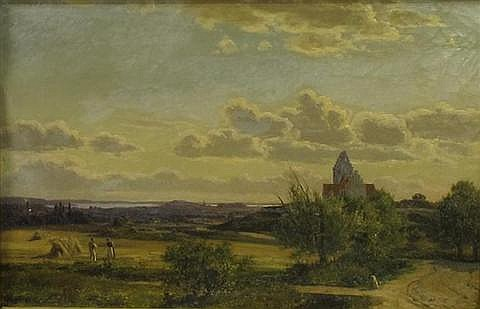
View of Nødebo and Lake Esrom

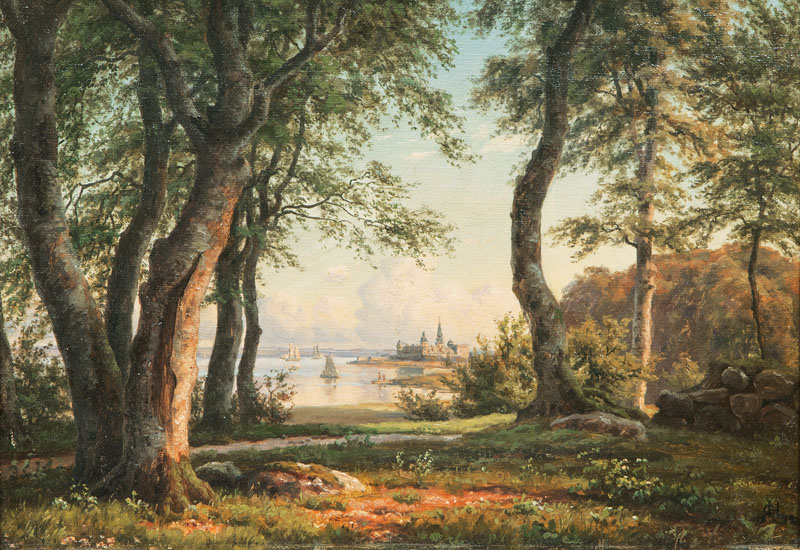
View of Kronborg Castle

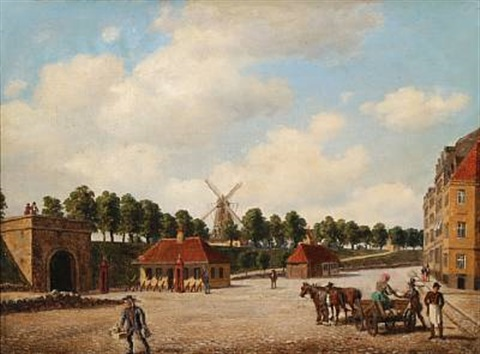
View of Vesterport in Copenhagen

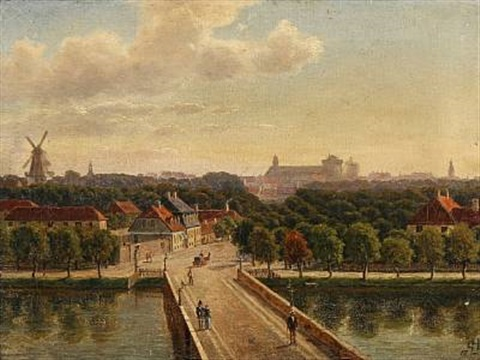
View from Nørrevold towards Copenhagen, 1864
