= Josephine Schneider =

Danish philanthropist and orphanage principal (1820–1887)

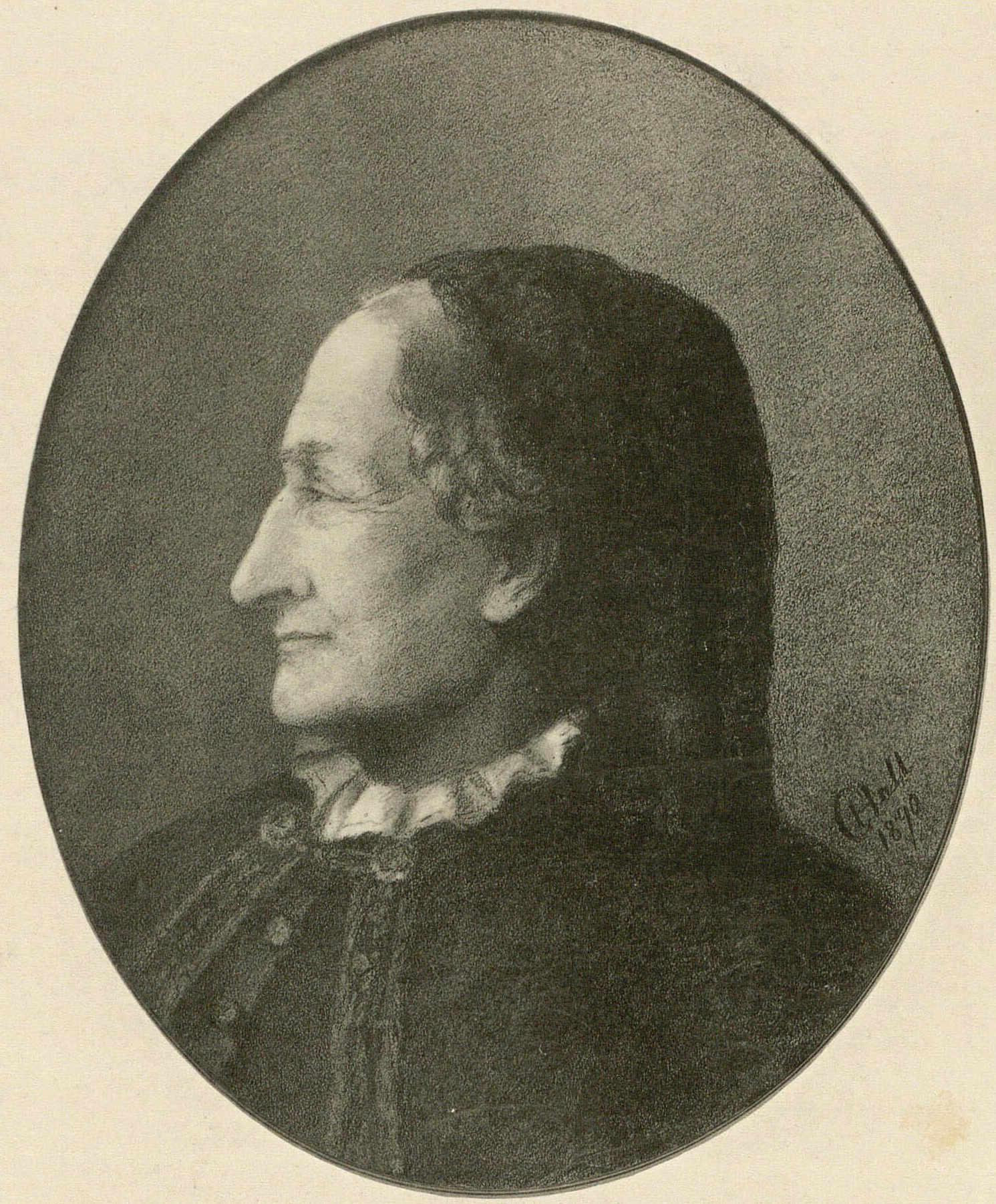
Josephine Schneider

Lovise Josephine Schneider (8 September 1820, Nivaagaard — 25 June 1887, Frederiksberg) was a Danish philanthropist and school principal. In 1835, she moved to Vienna where she spent 12 years as the lady's maid of a diplomat's wife. Thereafter she studied in Germany where she took a special interest in social structures, especially homes for children. On returning to Copenhagen in 1860, she provided support and care for the poor. After first looking after children in her own home, she was successful in raising funds for the city's first private orphanage in 1874. It became so successful than a larger building was completed in 1880. At the time of her death, it housed 125 children.

== Early life ==
Born in Nivå north of Copenhagen on 8 September 1829, Lovise Josephine Schneider was the daughter of the estate manager Carl Frederik Schneider (c.1781–c.1832) and his wife Ane Christine née Rasmussen (c.1798–1844). After her father's death when she was still very young, she was brought up on the Hellebæk Estate where her grandfather was an administrator. Here she met Baroness Adelaide von Løwenstern, wife of Georg Heinrich von Löwenstern.

== Career ==
When von Løwenst

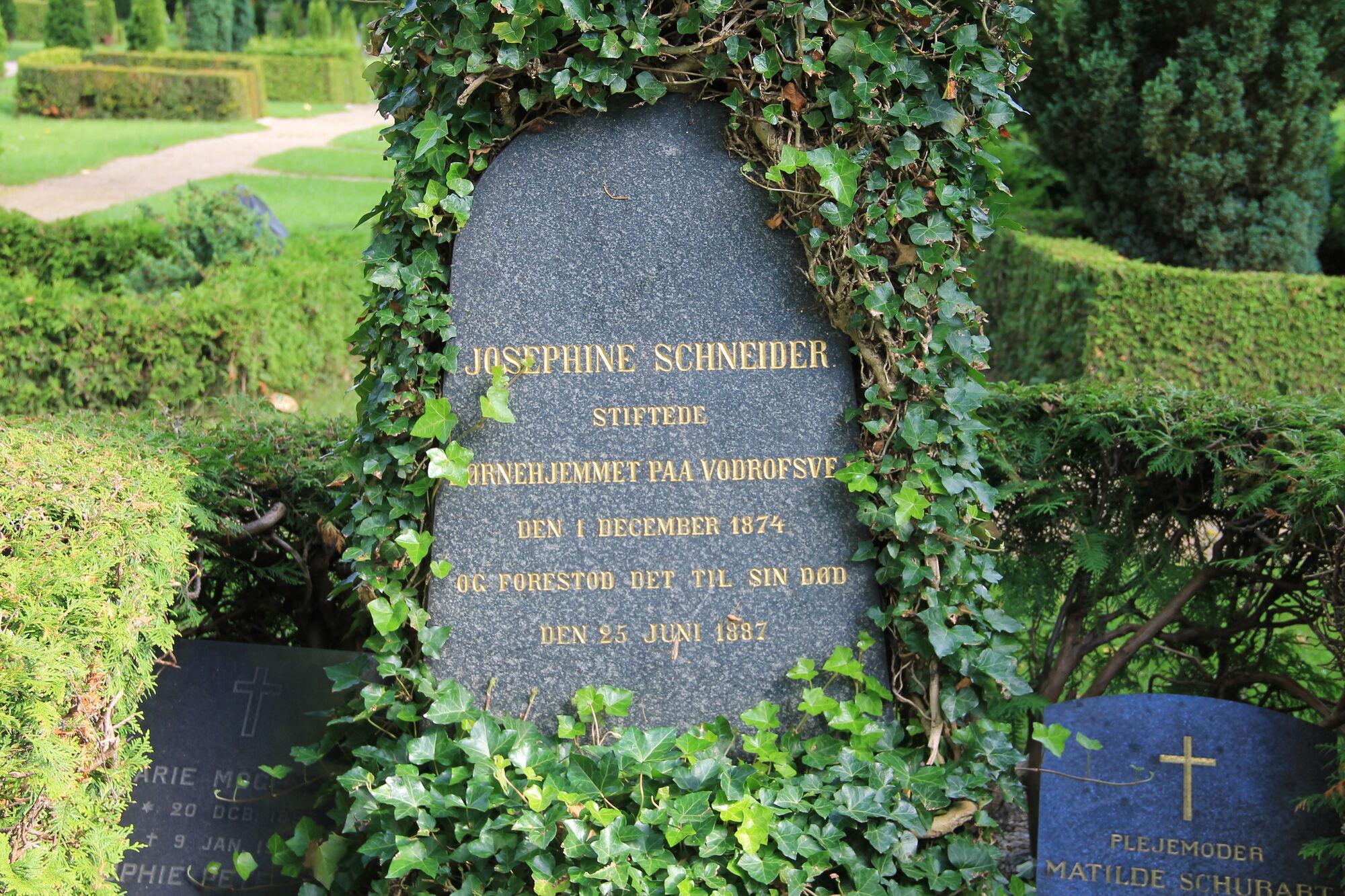
Schneider's tombstone at Solbjerg Park Cemetery.

ern was appointed Danish envoy to Austria in 1835, Schneider moved to Vienna as his wife's lady's maid until 1847. Thereafter, she spent the next 13 years abroad studying literature and art while taking a special interest in children's homes, orphanages and similar philanthropic institutions in Germany, Austria and Hungary.

In 1860, she returned to Copenhagen where she became one of the first educated women to help prostitutes lead a decent life. She also provided the poor with food and clothing and visited the sick in Frederiks Hospital, reading to them and providing good advice. After she become head of Den kvindelige Plejeforening for Frederiksberg og Vesterbro (Women's Care Association for Frederksberg and Vesterbro), she followed the lives of foster children who often faced considerable difficulties.

From 1866, she cared for foster children in her own home where she had no less than 14 girls by 1874. Thanks to her success in fund raising, she was able to open a small home but numbers increased so rapidly that she opened a larger home on Vodroffsvejwhich by 1885 accommodated over 100 children in 1885.

Josephine Schneider died in the Frederiksberg district of Copenhagen on 25 June 1887. At the time of her death, the home housed 125 children. The home which continues to operate today is now known as Josephine Scheiders Hus.
