= Mimir and Balder Consult the Norns =

1822 relief by Hermann Ernst Freund

- Mimer og Balder rådspørger nornerne (Danish)
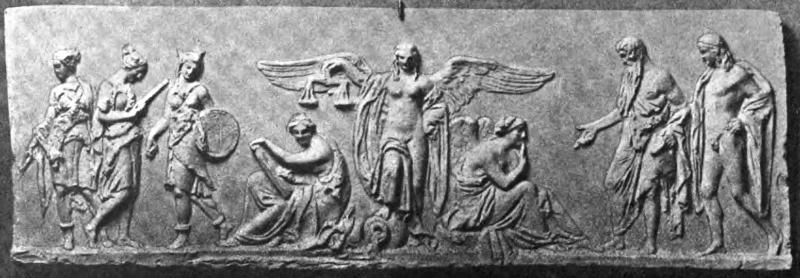
- Artist: Hermann Ernst Freund
- Year: 1822
- Type: Plaster
- Dimensions: 34 cm × 101 cm (13 in × 40 in)
- Location: Ny Carlsberg Glyptotek; Copenhagen

Mimir and Balder Consult the Norns (Danish: Mimer og Balder rådspørger nornerne) is an 1822 relief by Hermann Ernst Freund now on display in the Ny Carlsberg Glyptotek in Copenhagen, Denmark. The winning entry in a competition launched to promote the interest in Norse mythology among Danish artists, it depicts Mimir and Balder consulting the Norns. Works of Norse mythology would later dominate the rest of Freund's oeuvre, culminating with his monumental Ragnarok Frieze for Christian Frederik Hansen's new Christiansborg Palace.

== Background ==
In 1801, Adam Oehlenschläger argued that Danish art should use Nordic themes instead of relying on Greek mythology for inspiration, as they would stimulate people's love for their homeland. A number of publications, including most notably N. F. S. Grundtvig's Nordens mytologi (1808) and Nordiske Digte (1807) and Adam Oehlenschläger's Nordens Guder (1819), contributed to promoting interest in the subject among both artists and the general public. The new trend was met with criticism from others, who observed that medieval sources did not provide any type of reference or information relevant to their images. This so-called Mythology Dispute dominated the Danish art scene in the years between 1812 and 1821, dividing the Royal Danish Academy of Fine Arts. In 1814, upon orders from Crown Prince Christian, it was made mandatory for the Academy's professor of history to include Nordic history and mythology in his teachings. It was also proposed to reproduce Johannes Wiedewelt's illustrations from the 1780s of Johannes Ewald's The Death of Balder (1669, published 1775). In 1819 and 1828, Finnur Magnússon was engaged as an instructor in mythology and Nordic literature for art students.

Torkel Baden, secretary of the Academy of Fine Arts, refuted Jens Møller's ideas, stating that the Nordic themes were deformed and useless, unlike those of classical mythology, which was sublime, ideal and cultured. The painter C. F. Høyer supported him, asserting that classical and Christian motifs should prevail in Danish art.

== 1821–22 Copenhagen Mythological Competition ==
In 1820, Jonas Collin, supported by Johan Bülow, fostered the idea of an artistic competition with a Nordic theme. On 21 May 1821, it was announced via advertisements in several Copenhagen newspapers. The competition was also promoted by the Scandinavian Literature Society. It comprised three categories: sketches for paintings, relief compositions and drawings of individual figures. The deadline for participation in the competition was 1 May 1822 and the first prize in each category was 200 species daler. The jury consisted of Jonas Collin, historian Peter Erasmus Müller, writer Adam Oehlenschläger, architects Christian Frederik Hansen and Gustav Friedrich Hetsch, and painters Christian August Lorentzen and C. W. Eckersberg.

Hermann Ernst Freund won the first prize in the relief composition category for his relief of Mimir and Balder. Freund knew Collin from the Royal Mint. in a letter from October 1820, Collin had already prior to the competition suggested Freund create some works with inspiration from Norse mythology. In connection with the competition, he had also sent him Finnur Magnússon's translation of the Elder Edda and Oehlenschläger's Nordens Guder. The two other categories were won by J. L. Lund and Andreas Ludvig Koop.

== Description ==
Freund's relief depicts Mimir and Balder consulting the Norns. The composition is very similar to that of Lund's winning entry in the painting category. The two artists were friends but it is not known who was inspired by whom.

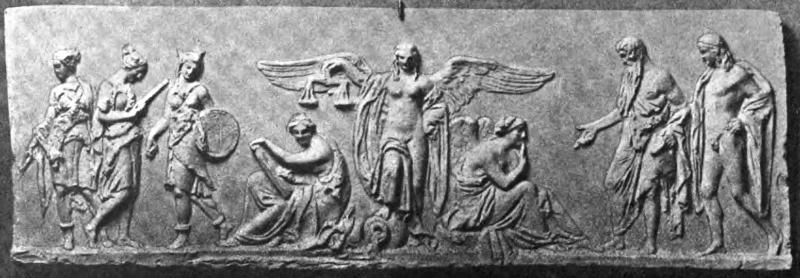
Mimir and Balder Consult the Norns

== See also ==
- The Death of Balder
