= Georg Gerson =

Danish composer and banker

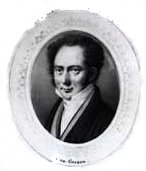

Background information
- Also known as: George Gerson
- Born: 14 October 1790; Copenhagen
- Died: 16 February 1825 (aged 34); Copenhagen
- Occupation(s): Banker, composer

Georg Gerson (also George; 14 October 1790 – 16 February 1825) was a Danish composer and banker. Most of his works are orchestral.

== Life ==
Gerson was the son of the Königsberg banker Heyman Gerson (1765–1839), who bore the title Chaijm Kenigsberg on his the letter of escort to Copenhagen in 1789, and Sprinzche Esperance Melchior (1771–1797). He was born into a soon-to-be-prosperous Reform Jewish family, who, like most Jewish residents in Copenhagen, spoke German. He had a sister, a half-brother, and a half-sister.

Georg Gerson showed business talent as a teenager in his classes at the philanthropic Det Schouboeske Institut. At the age of 15, he was sent to Hamburg to apprentice at Fürst, Haller & Comp. He was also very talented musically. In 1807 his teacher Martin Joseph Haller introduced him to amateur musicians who performed string quartets on domestic salon music evenings. In this way, during his time in Hamburg, not least because he was a popular guest with the merchant families Fürst and Haller, he came into close contact with two virtuosos at that time, the violinist Andreas Romberg, who soon took over Gerson's training as a composer, and the cellist Bernhard Romberg (a cousin of Andreas). Andreas Romberg remained Gerson's compositional consultant for life. Gerson also studied music theory.

When he returned to Copenhagen in 1812, he joined the banking company Hambro og Søn, becoming a co-owner in 1816. Gerson played in a quartet and was also an active member of some notable music associations in Copenhagen, such as Det harmoniske Selskab around 1814 and the Selskabet for musikkens Udbredelse around 1820.

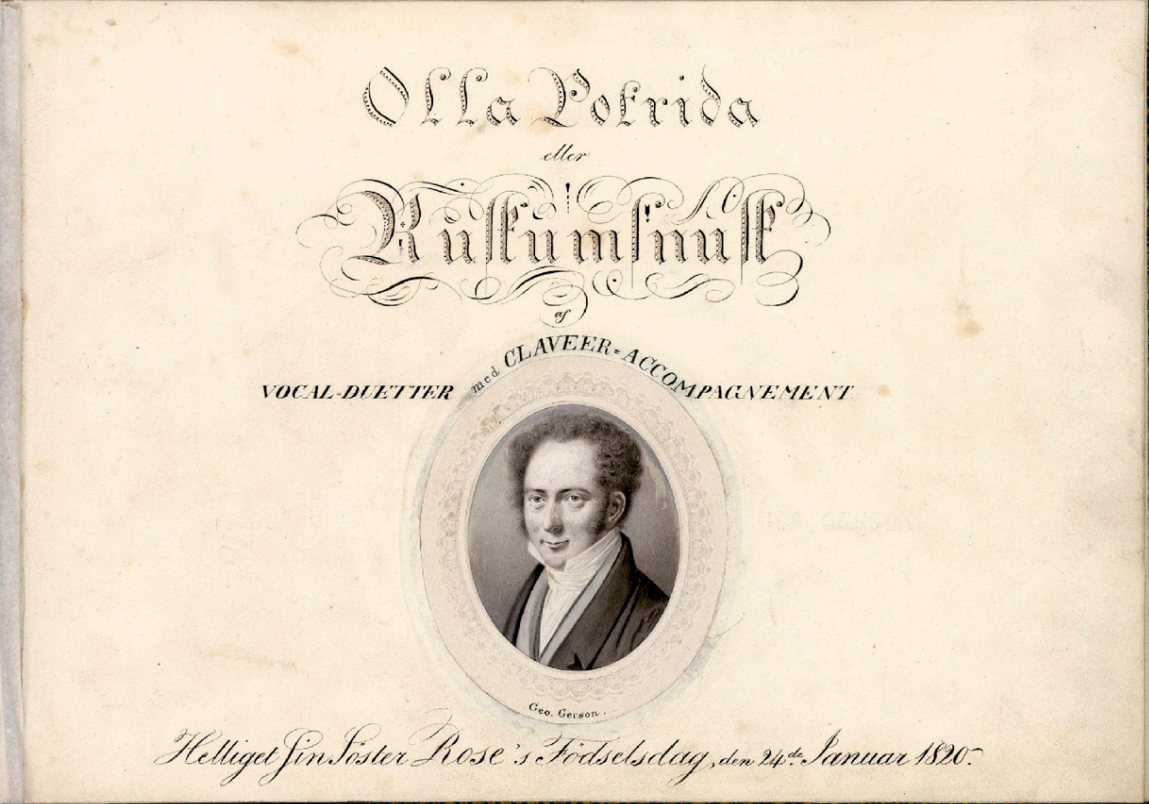
Georg Gerson.

He went on several business trips to London and wrote songs there in English, including two on poems by Thomas Moore. After brokering a loan to the Danish Treasury from England, Gerson and his business partner Joseph Hambro were appointed "Hofråd" in 1821 by King Frederik VI. On the way home from one of his trips to London, Gerson suffered a stroke in Hamburg that paralyzed his left hand, ending his activity as a musician. He died in 1825 of another stroke at the age of 34, just four months after marrying Adelaide Nathan-David (1796–1891), a niece of his stepmother Emilie Nathan David (1777–1855).

== Works ==
- Concert Overture in D major (1813)
- Symphony in E flat major (1817)
- Concert Overture in E Flat Major (1818)
- Violin concerto (1821)
- 5 string quartets
- 1 string quintet
- 2 Italian scenes (for orchestra)
- Paternoster for male choir
- numerous vocal works
