= Gotfred Tvede =

Danish architect (1863–1947)

Christen Gotfred Tvede (7 October 1863 - 30 December 1947) was a prolific Danish architect.

== Early life and education ==
Tvede was born on 7 October 1853 in Copenhagen, the son of architect Vilhelm Tvede (1826–91) and Maren Ostermann (1836-1916). The family lived at Nybrogade 18. He completed a mason's apprenticeship in 1883, having concurrently attended Copenhagen Technical School. He graduated from the Royal Danish Academy of Fine Arts' school of architecture in 1890. In 1891 he won the Neuhausensk Prize.

== Career ==
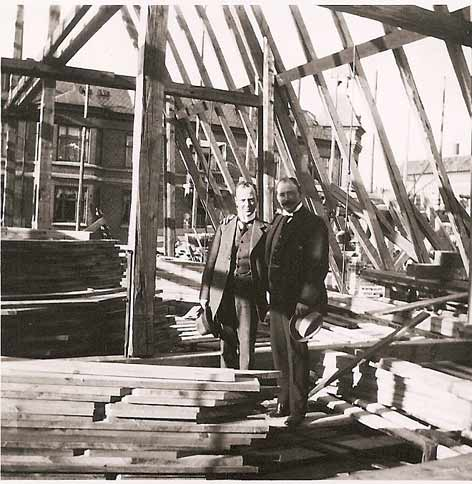
Tvede at the Godthåb Church construction site, 1910.

Tvede continued his father's architectural studio from 1781. His early works were influenced by the Historicist trends of the time. One of his first works was a senior citizens home in De Gamles By in Copenhagen for which he was awarded the art academy's Eckersberg Medal. Other works from this early part of his career include the Danish East Asiatic Company's headquarters at Indiakaj (1898) and Holmens Kanal (1907 ), Berners stiftelse (Ribegade 10, 1904), Villa Moltke in Helsingør (N ordre Strandvej 24, 1910), Godthåb Church (Nyelandsvej and General Classen's Asylum (Nylandsvej 51, 1910–11) and a library building at Herlufsholm School.

Many of Tvede's works from the years after the turn of the century were designed in the Baroque Revival style. He was awarded another Annual Medal for his design of the and the Finsen Institute at Rosenvænget in Østerbro (1908). Other Baroque Revival style buildings by Tvede include the Plessen Mansion on Kristianiagade (1902–04), Kronprinsessegade 4 (1913), Næsgård Agrivultural School (1907–08)m Sørup, 1909), Løndal (1911–14) and Barritskov (1914-16).

He became a member of the art academy's plenary assembly in 1908 and the Akad.rådet in 1928-32. He was also active in Foren. til Hovedstadens Forskønnelse (1906–12).

Tvede was created a Knight of the Order of the Dannebrog in 1911. He was awarded the Cross of Honour in 1919, He became a 2nd-class Commander in the Order of the Dannebrog in 1935. He was created an honorary member of the Danish Association of Architects in 1843.

== Personal life ==
Tvede was married to Bodil Marie Dorph-Petersen (1873-1964) on 31 August 1895. She was a daughter of actor and later business executive J.F.S. Dorph-Petersen (1845-1927) and Rose C. Sødring (1850-1927).

== List of works ==
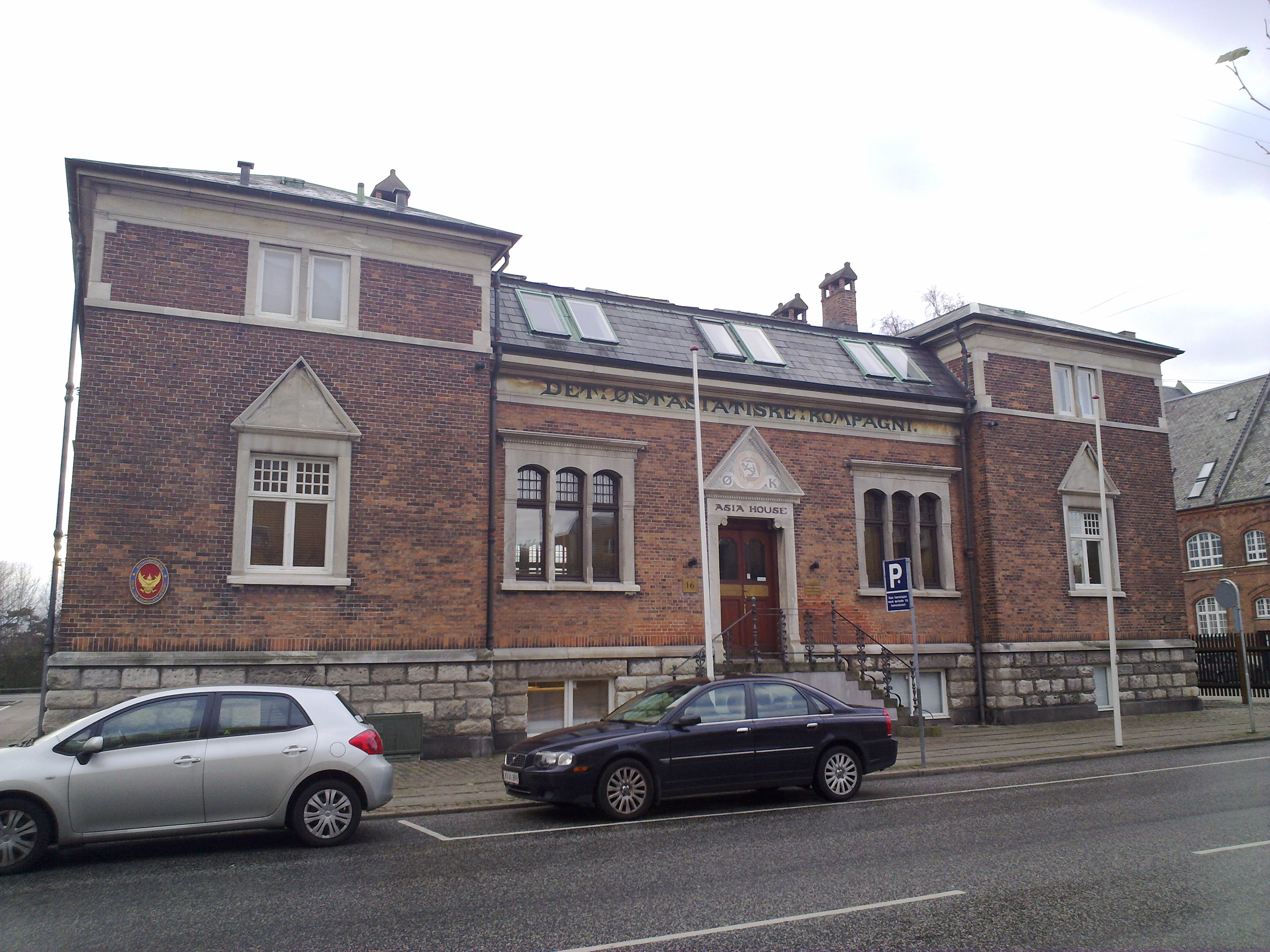
Danish East Asiatic Company's former headquarters, Indiajah, Copenhagen.

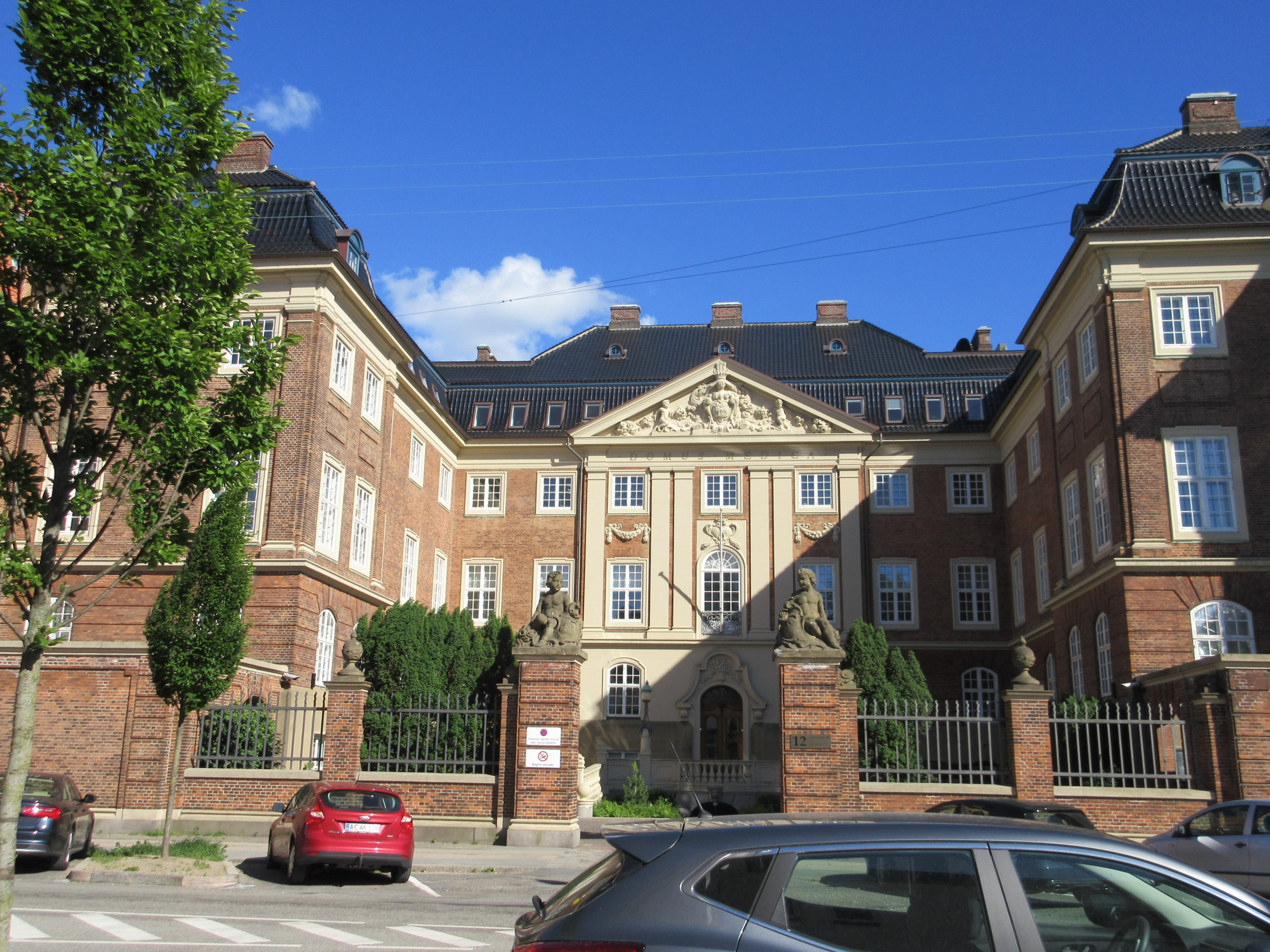
The former Plessen Mansion, now Domus Medica, Copenhagen.

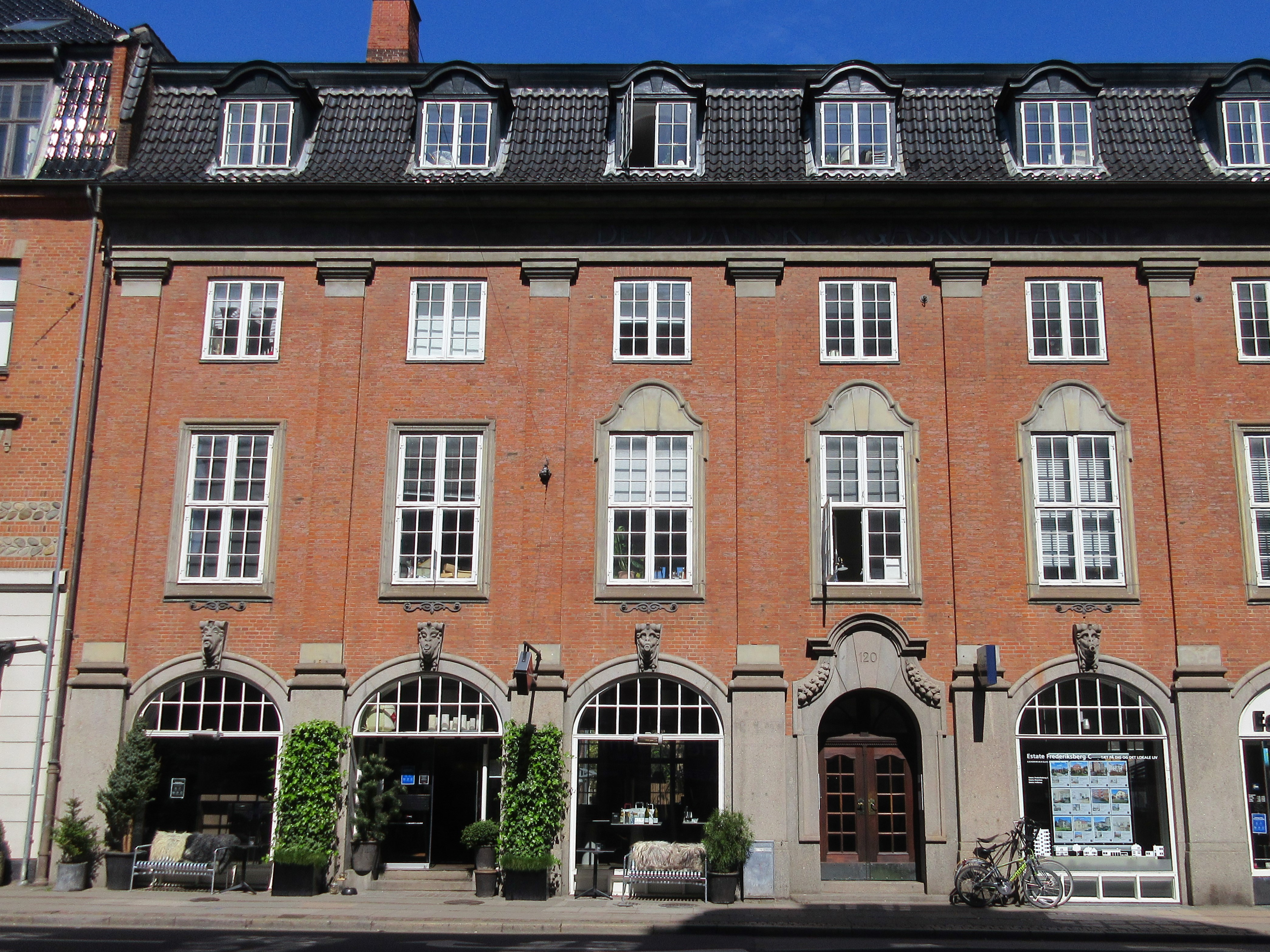
Gammel Kongevej 120, Frederiksberg (1907).

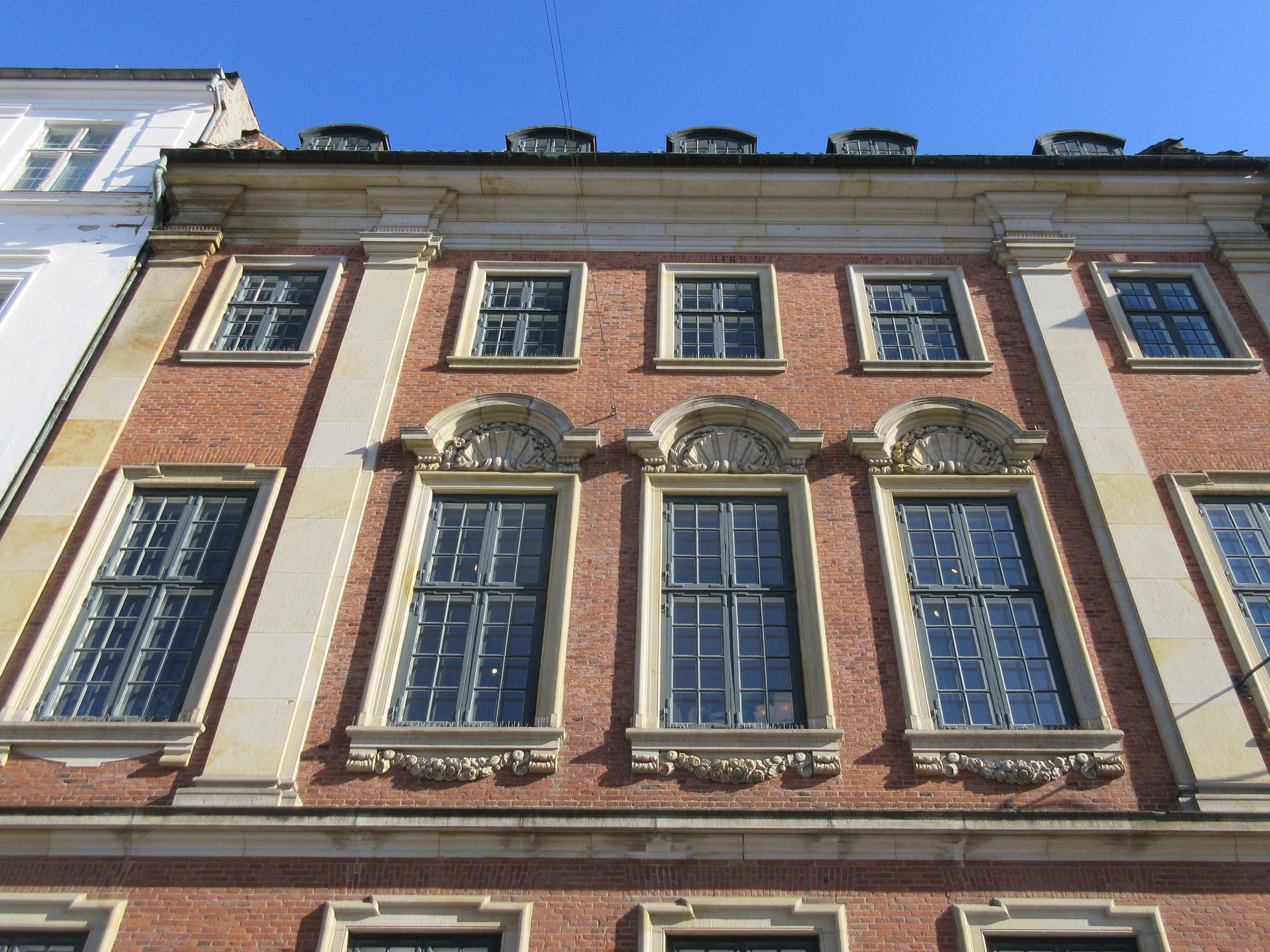
Kronprinsessegade 4, Copenhagen.

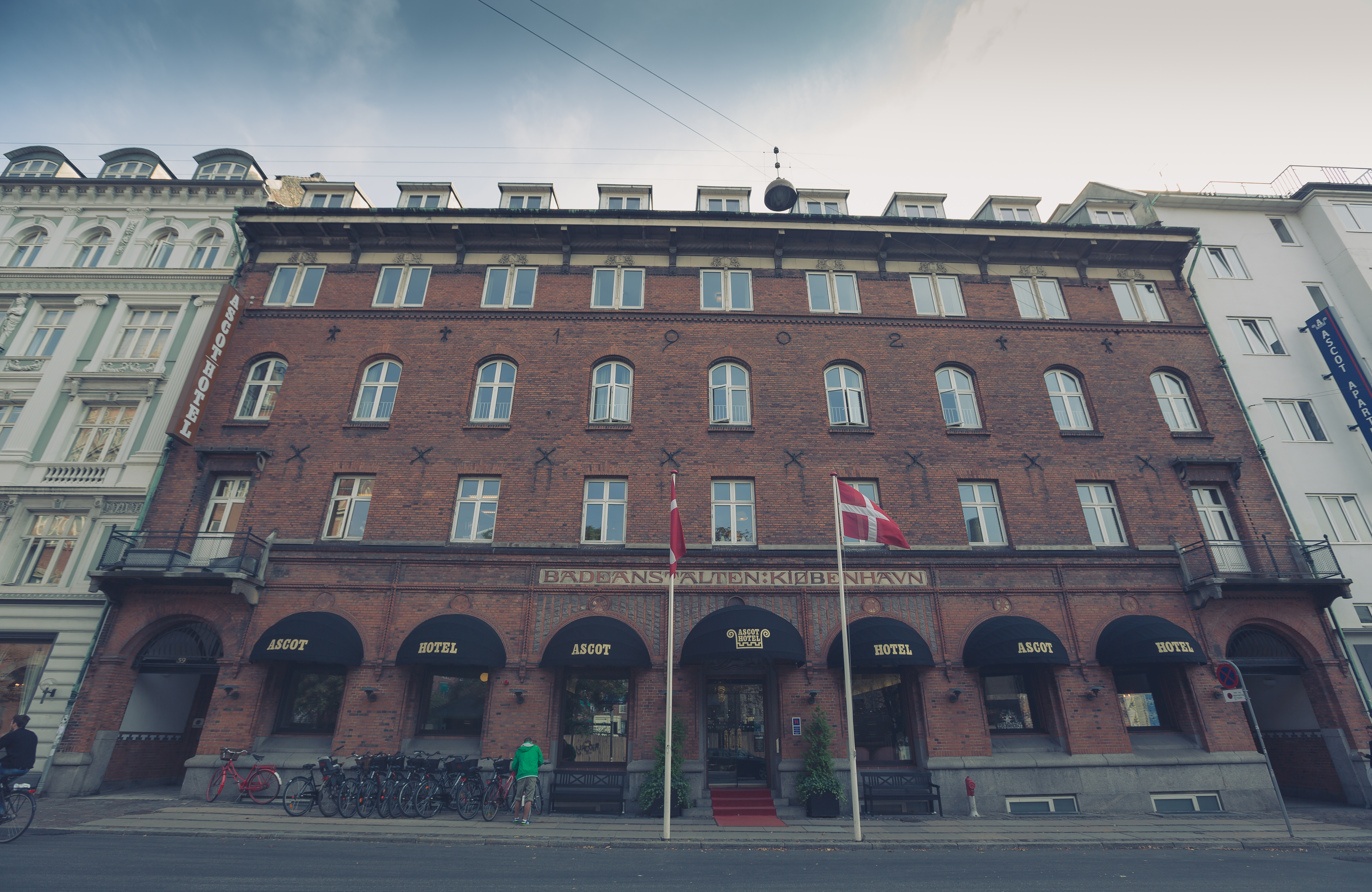
Ascot Hotel Copenhagen.

Tvede's works include:

- Charlottenlund Racetrack, Charlottenlund (1891)
- Senior citizens ho,e, De Gamles By, Copenhagen (1897-1901)
- Danish East Asiatic Company headquarters, Indiakaj (Hovedvej 14), Freeport of Copenhagen (1898, together with Valdemar Schmidt)
- Bryggeriet Heidrun, Dronning Olgas Vej 70, Frederiksberg (1896–98, demolished)
- Rørdal Arbejderby, Aalborg (1899-1901, together with Olaf Schmidth)
- White Hoiuses for Frederiksberg Gasworks Workers' Building Association, Frederiksberg (1900, together with Olaf Schmidth)
- Rungstedgårds Ladegårdm Rungsted (1900)
- Finsen Institute, Rosenvængets Hovedvej 4 (1900–01)
- Extension of Hørbygaard (north wing), Holbæk (1900–01)
- Copenhagen Public Baths (now Ascot Hotel Copenhagen), Studiestræde 63 (1901–03, together with Valdemar Schmidt and engineerV. Nohr, listed)
- Plessen Mansion, Kristianiagade 12 og Trondhjemsgade 9 (1901–06)
- Berners Stiftelse, Ribegade 10 (1904)
- Foreningen af Fabrikanter i Jernindustrien i København headquarters, Nørre Voldgade 30 (1903–04, præmieret 1905, together with Fritz Koch)
- Kgl. Brand headquarters, Højbro Plads 10 (1904–06, together with Fritz Koch)
- Hotel Hornbækhus, Skovvej 7, Hornbæk (1904)
- Director's house,Glostrup Brewery, Glostrup (1905)
- Farm buildings, Holtegård, Nordsjælland (1906)
- medical clinic, Herlufsholm School, Næstved (1906)
- Finsen Institute, A.F. Kriegers Vej/Rosenvængets Hovedvej (1906–08)
- Det danske Gaskompagni headquarters, Gammel Kongevej 120 (1907)
- Næsgårds Agricultural School, Stubbekøbing, Falster (1907–08)
- Villa for ingeniør Alexander Foss, Høvildgård, Aarhus County (1908)
- Danish Asiatic Company headquarters, Holbergsgade 2 (1907–08, præmieret 1909)
- Missionshuset Bethlehem, Ringsted (1909)
- Sørup Manor, Ringsted (1909, south wing not by Tvede)
- Villa Skrænten for Christian Schmiegelow, Sofievej 11, Vedbæk (1908, expanded1916)
- Løndal, Salten Langsø (1911–14)
- Hvilehjemmet Rørbæk, Sakskøbing (1913)
- Library building, Herlufsholm School, Næstved (1913–15)
- House for Poul Larsen, Højkol Silkeborg (1906, expanded 1917)
- Ved Glyptoteket 6, Copenhagen (1906-087
- Barritskov, Juelsminde (1914–16)
- Maltfabrik, Gasværksvej 16 (1908–09 and 1917)
- Christian X's Allé 172, Kongens Lyngby (1910)
- Villa Moltke, Ndordre Strandvej 24, Helsingør (1910)
- Building for manufacturing bank note paper, Silkeborg Paper Factory, Silkeborg (1910, later expanded)
- Godthaabskirken and General Classens Asyl, Nyelandsvej 49-51, Frederiksberg (1910–11)
- Kronprinsessegade 4, Copenhagen (1913)
- Svanemøllevej 17-19 (1912)
- Ordrupgaard, Vilvordevej 110, Charlottenlund (1916–19, together with Therkel Hjejle)
- Rungsted Ladegård, Rungstedlund, Rungsted Kyst (1917)
- Smidstrup Strandgård, Fredheimvej 7, Rungsted (1917)
- Villa for Alexander Foss, Bjerregårdsvej 4, Valby (1917)
- Bell-ringer's house, ]] Beldringe. Præstø (1917)
- Villa for Aage Heyman, Øster Allé 33, Copenhagen (1918)
- Richelieus Allé 12, Hellerup, Hellerup (1918, together with Einar Madvig)
- Finsen Institute main building, Strandboulevarden 49 (1919–21)
- Factory for Georg Jensens Sølvsmedie, Ragnagade 7, Østerbro, Copenhagen(1919–21)
- Hj. Hartmann & Co.'s Frølager, Glostrup (1920)
- Københavns Sygehjem, Ordrupvej 32, Ordrup (1920–22)
- Hammerensgade 4/Bornholmsgade 3 (1921)
- Seaman's Home for the Danish Rast Asiatic Company, Strandboulevarden/Gefionsgade (1921–22)
- Extension of Diakonissestiftelsen, Peter Bangs Vej (1922–25)
- Country house for Hjalmar Hartmann, Nordhusvej 30, Tisvilde (1924)
- Extension of Teknologisk Institut, Vester Farimagsgade 20 (1926–27)
- Extension of Bikuben, Silkegade 8 (1928)
- Villa, Gammel Vartov Vej 20 (1928, started by Niels Rosenkjær)
- Summer house, Tisvildeleje, Højbohusvej 5
- Gramhus (dower house), Gram Castle, Slotsvej 46, Gram (1939)
- Københavns Papir- og Kartonfabrik, Borgmestervangen 24 (1931–34, nedrevet)

=== Adaptions and refurbishments ===
- Amaliegade 15, Copenhagen (1892, heightened with ½ floor)
- Førslev Church, Næstved (1892)
- Thott Mansion, now French Rmbassy, Kongens Nytorv 4 (1893)
- Hjemmet for Vanføre, Esplanaden 34 (1895-1919, together with Caspar Leuning Borch)
- Gram Castle, Gram (1903)
- Vestergade 33 (for F.L. Smidth & Co.), Copenhagen (1907)
- Nærumgård (as municipal orphanage), Nærum (1907–08)
- Arresødal, Frederiksværk (1908)
- Vommandant's House, Rosenborg Castle, Copenhagen (1910, later altered)
- Lundbygård, Præstø (1910)
- Søholm, Emdrup (1912–15)
- Villa Skrænten, Sofievej 11, Vedbæk (1916)
- Studenterhuset, Bispetorv 1, /for Handels- og Kontoristforeningen), Copenhagen (1916–17)
- Holmen Church, Copenhagen (1919)
- Moltke Mansion, Dronningens Tværgade 2 (for Håndværkerforeningen=, Copenhagen (1930–32)
- Tirsbæk, ved Vejle (1912)
- Gurrehus, Gurre(ca. 1912)
- Fjellebro, Svendborg (1912–13)
- Visborggård, Hadsund (1913)
- Løvenholt, Silkeborg (1920)
- Summer house, Tem (1924)
