= Oluf Munck =

Oluf Munck (October 14, 1886 in Copenhagen – July 23, 1943 in Antjol, Dutch East Indies) was a Danish physician and anti-Japanese resistance fighter during World War II.

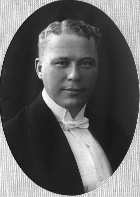

== Life and career ==
Oluf Munck was the son of wholesaler Erik Munck and Ellen Margrethe Friehling. In 1908 married Bodil Jerichau. He graduated from Herlufsholm School in Denmark, became a cand.med. and participated as a doctor in the Finnish Civil War in 1918.

Oluf Munck emigrated to the Dutch East Indies in 1920. He joined the Dutch colonial forces (KNIL) as a lieutenant and doctor and worked at the military hospital in Tjimahi on the island of Java as a specialist in tropical medicine. When the Japanese occupied Java in 1941, Oluf Munck was involved in resistance work, which caused him to be arrested, tortured and finally beheaded by the Japanese. He is buried today with thousands of other victims of the struggle against the Japanese on the international cemetery of war victims in Anjol, north of Jakarta, Indonesia.

Munck has posthumously received honorary medals from the Dutch and Danish royal houses (Chr. X) and there are memorials to him in Domus Medica in Kristianiagade, Copenhagen and in the castle church at Herlufsholm Diet School in Denmark. In Holland, a bridge is named after the resistance group he was a part of.
