= Bispegården, Copenhagen =

Building in Copenhagen, Denmark

Bispegården
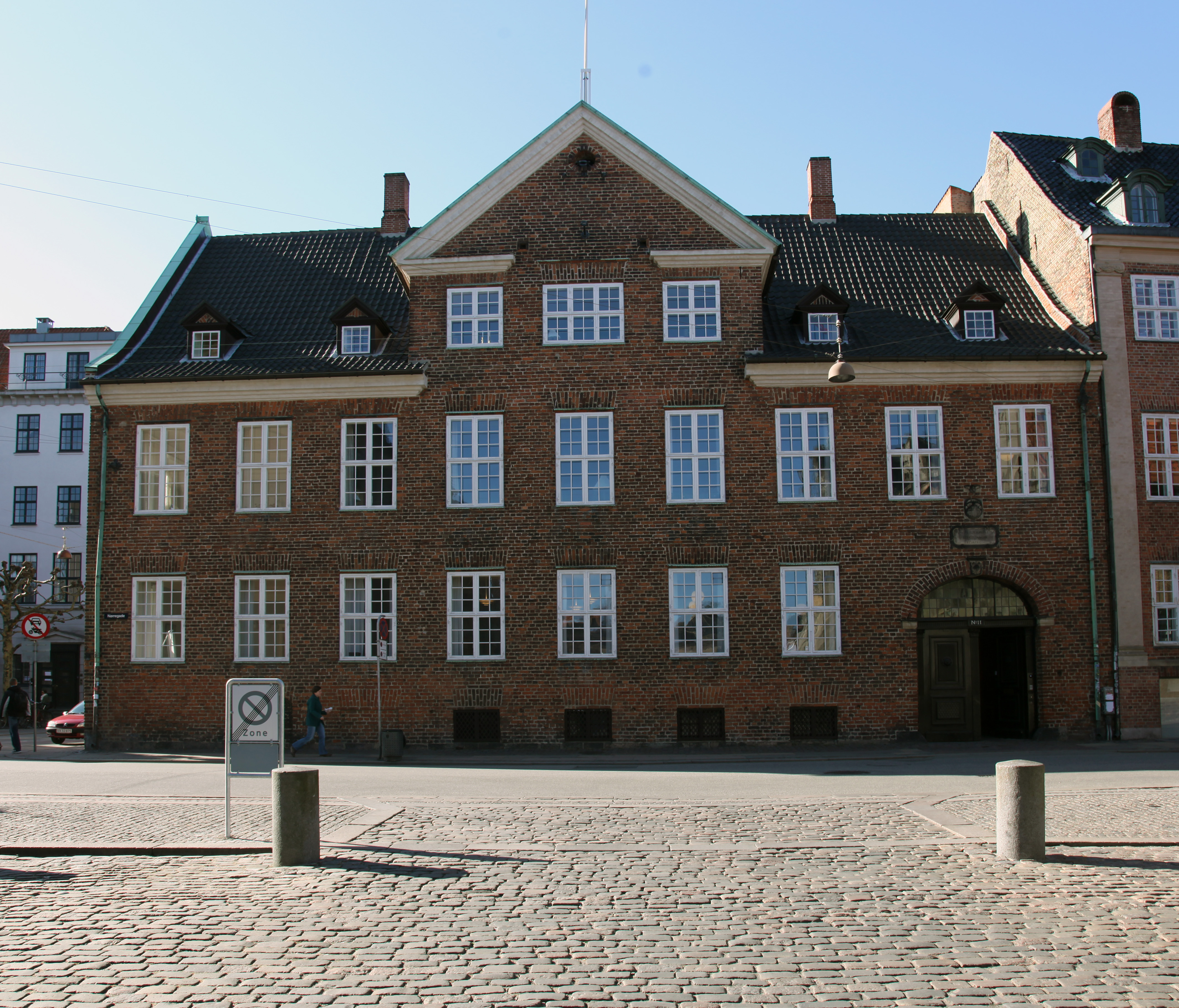
- Bispegården (to the left) seen from Frue Plads with the University in the foreground to the right
- Interactive map of the Bispegården area

General information
- Architectural style: Rococo
- Location: Copenhagen, Denmark
- Coordinates: 55.6794°N 12.5717°E
- Completed: 1732
- Client: Diocese of Zealand

Technical details
- Structural system: Masonry (toward the street); Timber framing (toward the yard)

Design and construction
- Architects: Lars Erichsen; Martin Nyrop (alterations)

Bispegården (English: The Bishop's House) in Copenhagen, Denmark, is the residence and office of the Bishop of Copenhagen. It is located across the street from Copenhagen Cathedral and Frue Plads, on the corner of Nørregade and Studiestræde, in the city centre. Bispetorv, the small square next to it, is named after the building.

== History ==
=== Pre-Reformation situation ===
The Bishop's House stands on the site where Copenhagen's second city hall was built in about 1400. It was a four-winged building in Gothic style. In 1479, a new city hall was completed on nearby Gammeltorv and the old building was taken over by the University of Copenhagen which was founded the same year by King Christian I with the approval of Pope Sixtus IV.

At that time, the Roman-Catholic Bishop of Roskilde had his bishop's palace on Vor Frue Plads on the other side of the street, where it had been built after Bishop Henrik Gertsen gave up Absalon's Castle on Slotsholmen to King Valdemar IV in 1350.

=== After the Reformation ===
After the Reformation, the new Lutheran Bishop of Zealand was given the university's building, while the university relocated to the dethroned Catholic bishop's palace. Still Roskilde Cathedral remained the seat of the new Lutheran diocese, as it had been for its Catholic predecessor.

=== After the Great Fire of 1728 ===
The Bishop's House was destroyed in the Copenhagen Fire of 1728 but rebuilt from 1731 to 1732, on the same site but smaller and to a new design by Lars Erichsen, a master builder, who also worked for the university.

In 1896, the building underwent a comprehensive renovation and alteration under the architect Martin Nyrop, known for designing the new Copenhagen City Hall completed in 1905.

== Architecture and decorations ==
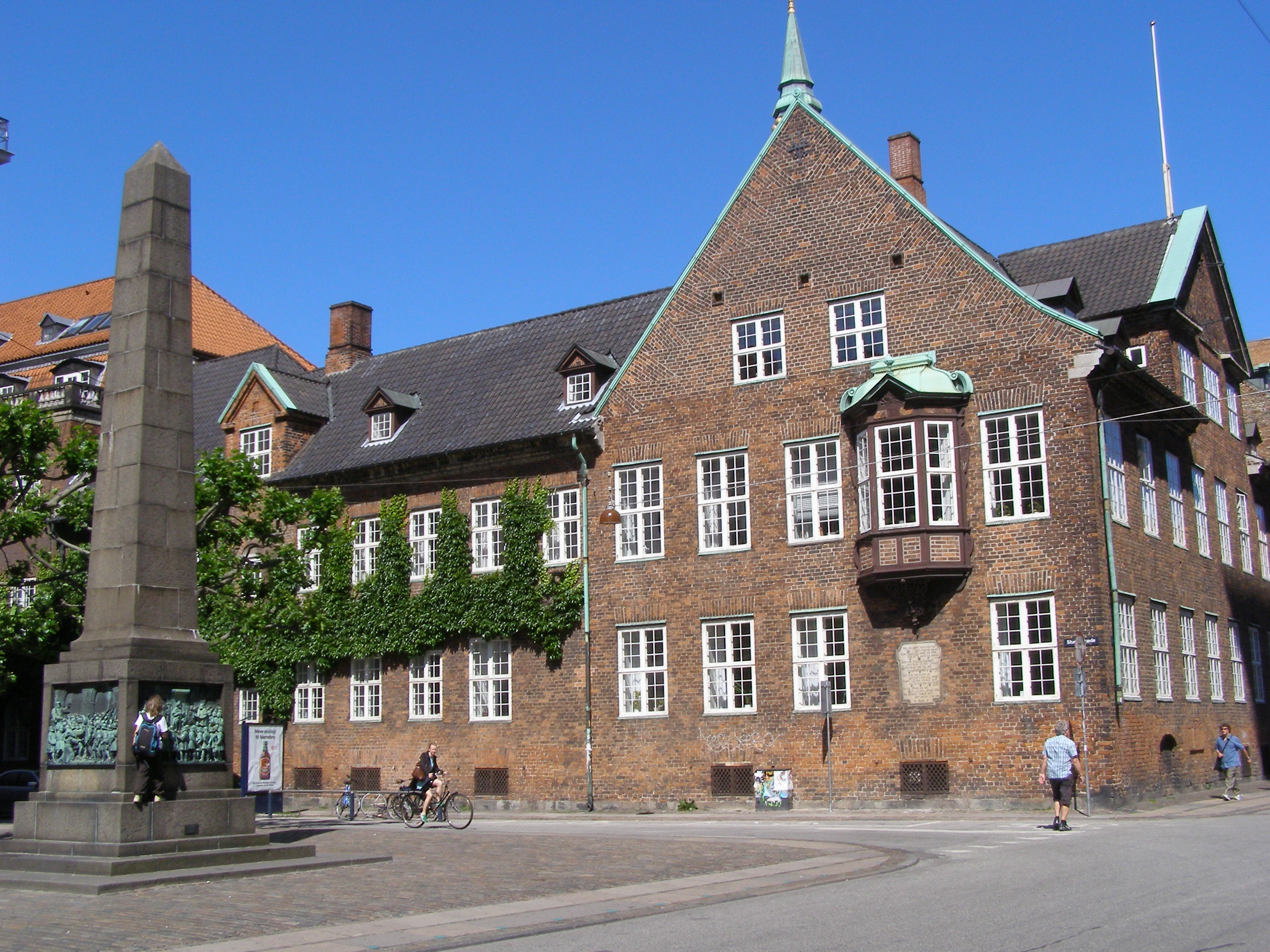
Bispegården

The Bishop's House consists of two wings and is built in warm red brick with a black tile roof. The building has timberframing toward the yard.

A bay window on the facade toward Studiestræde was added by Nyrop in the 1896 renovation. Below the window, there is a plaque, also designed and written by Nyrop, which commemorates the long history and former uses of the site: It reads:

Helt rædsomt man med mig i Tiden monne raade:
Som Raadhus først jeg stod vor By til Gavn og Baade. 1479.
Saa var jeg Studiegaard, men blev, da her i Landet Guds rene Ord fik Løb, til Bispegaard omdannet. 1537.
Det har jeg siden da igiennem Sekler været, skiønt Ild mig hærget har og Ild har paa mig tæret. 1728.
Nu er i stand jeg sat, Gud lad mig længe staa og skærm i Naade dem, som Bolig i mig faa. 1896

The seal and motto of Peder Palladius, the first Protestant bishop to reside in the property, is placed above the gate.

Bishop Friedrich Münter's collection of cultural artifacts is displayed in the gate and vestibule.

== See also ==
- Church of Denmark
