= Krebsegården =

Historic building in Copenhagen, Denmark

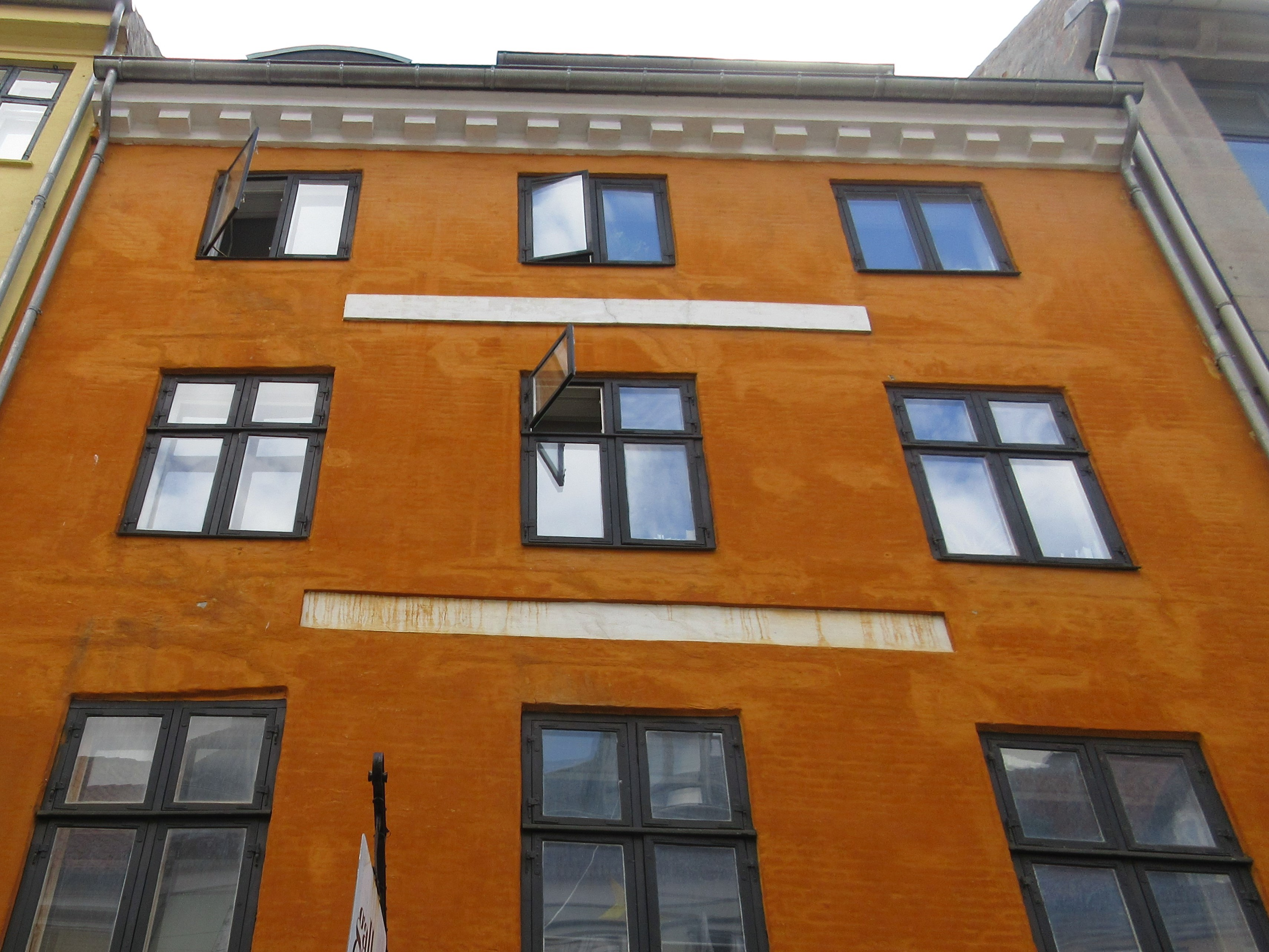
- Interactive map of the Krebsegården area

General information
- Architectural style: Neoclassical
- Location: Copenhagen, Denmark
- Coordinates: 55°40′42.71″N 12°34′12.54″E
- Completed: 1803

Design and construction
- Architect: Nicolas-Henri Jardin

Krebsegården is a historic property at Studiestræde 17 in the Latin Quarter of central Copenhagen, Denmark. The complex is from 1803 and consists of a building facing the street as well as a warehouse in the courtyard. Both buildings were listed on the Danish registry of protected buildings and places in 1989. The warehouse stands on a three-storey brick cellar which from its construction in the middle of the 19th century and up until the 1930s was used for the storage of first butter and then cheese. A restaurant and a commercial art gallery are now based in the ground floors of the two buildings.

== History ==
The origins of the name is unknown but it is probably derived from the German surname Krebs and refers to an owner in the 17th century or earlier.

The building was destroyed in the Copenhagen Fire of 1795 and the site was then left empty for eight years. The current building at the site was constructed in 1803 for Marthe Kirstine Obel, a widow who ran a game monger on Gammeltorv. Her tenants included captain lieutenant M. Bille and military auditor A. Hjelm with family. By 1809, Obel had sold the property to a string merchant named Lange. 10 years later the property had changed hands again and was now owned by timber merchant J. F. Faber. The property was by 1825 owned by his widow and all her tenants seems to have been women.

dolph Erichsen, a flour and grain dealer from Skindergade, purchased Krebsegården from Mrs. Faber in 1858 and his own home was from then on located on the first floor. The property was in 1876 ceded to a farmer, probably as security for the grain dealer's debts, but he sold it again a few months later. The new owner was merchant Johan Poulsen. He sold it to a police officer in 1889

The ground floor was over the decades home to various grocery stores, a taylor, a horse meat outlet and a coffee dealer. The three-storey cellar under the warehouse was for decades used for the storage of butter by H. A. Jersin while the office of his butter wholesale business was located on the first floor of the building fronting the street.

In 1897, it was acquired by Ferdinand Olsen, the manager of the Rasmussen brother's furniture shop in the building, who had himself been a tenant in the complex for some time. H. A. Jersin's office relocated to the warehouse and the apartment on the first floor of the main wing was instead taken over by Olsen for his personal use. The three-storey cellar under the warehouse was later taken over by Emil Jacobsen and up until the 1940s used for the storage of cheese.

The Olsen family would own the property for more than eighty years. Bernard Olsen and Oda B. Olsen had no children and Oda B. Olsen left the property to their relatives Ida Kingsted and her husband Ole Ole Kongsted. Ida Kongsted had lived in the apartment on the second floor since 1973.

Olsen's furniture rental service was based in the ground floor of the building until 1955. The prmises were then taken over by a record store, Intona, and then in 1961 by B. Anthony's antiquarian book store Rådhusantikvariatet. The name of the book shop was in 1975 changed to Byens Antikvariat by Richard Sørensen. Byens Antikvariat was later succeeded by an antique shop and then by a fashion shop.

In 1981, Ida and Ole Kongsted sold Krebsegården til gallerist Marietta Bonnet.

== Today ==
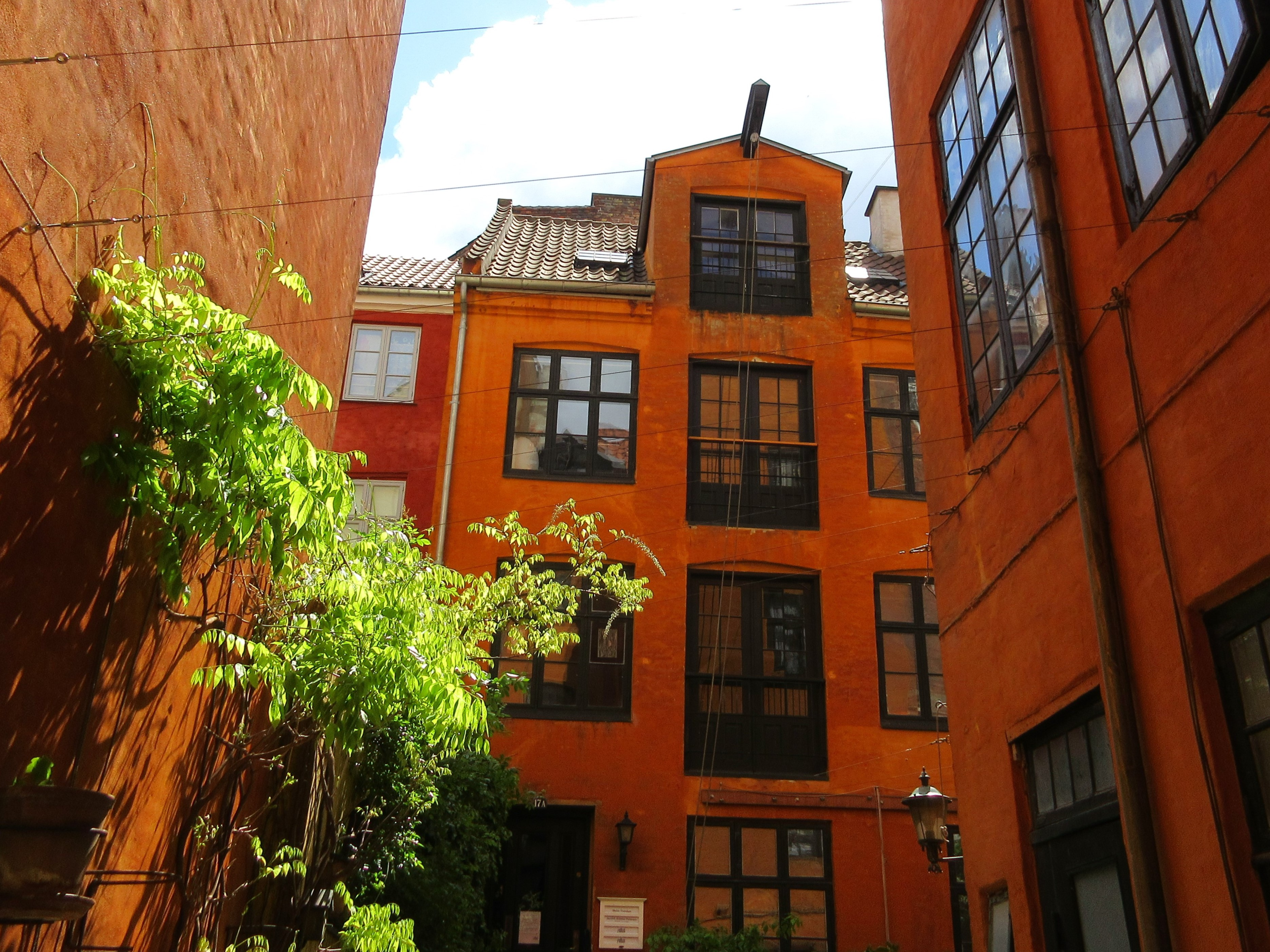
The warehouse in the courtyard

Marietta Bonnet operates the commercial art gallery Galleri Krebsen in the warehouse in the courtyard.. It specializes in Nordic artists. Restaurant Krebsen is based in the ground floor of the building facing the street. The restaurant and the art gallery collaborates.
