= Bispetorv, Copenhagen =

Square in Copenhagen, Denmark

Bispetorv
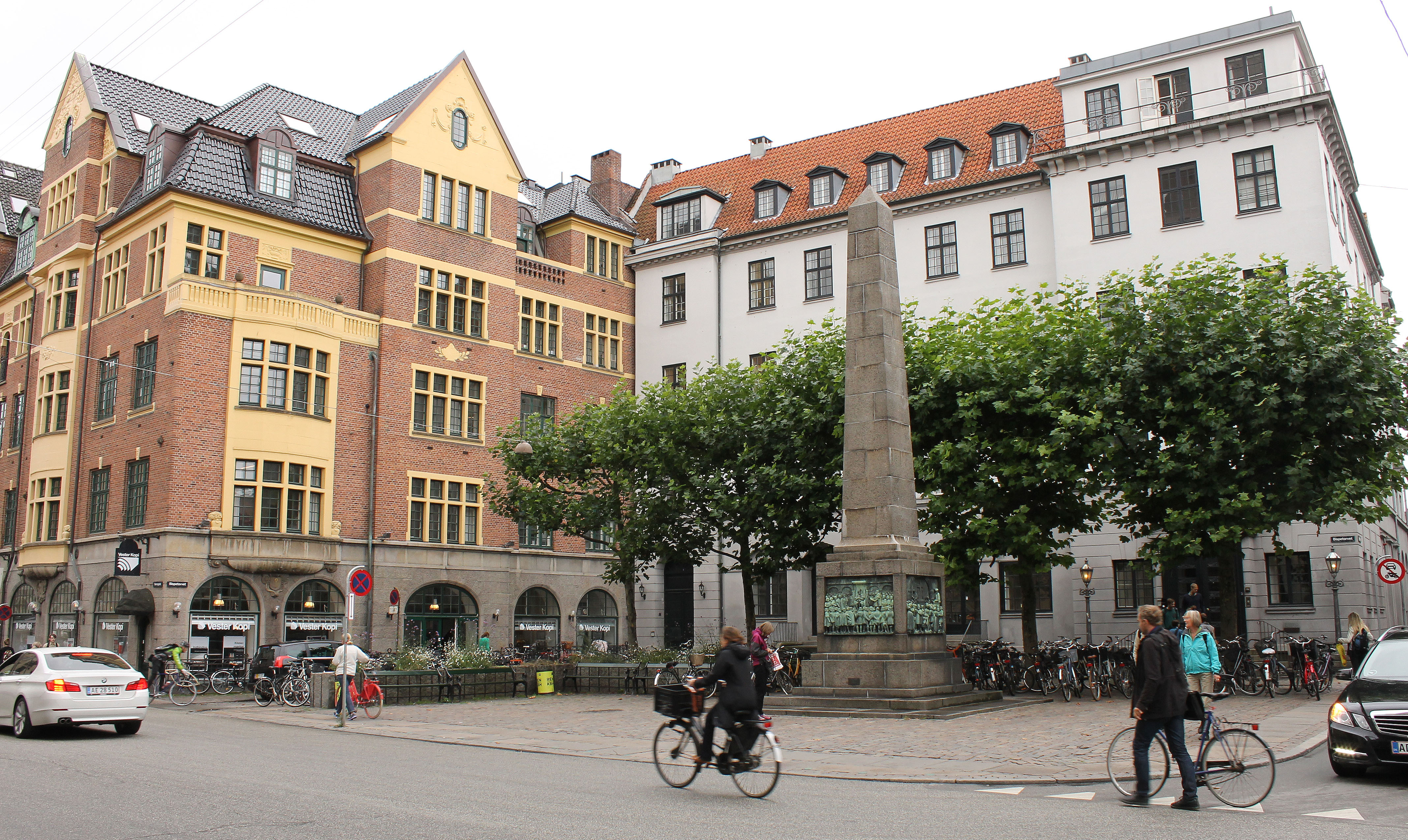
- Bispetorv seen from Nørregade
- Interactive map of Bispetorv
- Location: Indre By, Copenhagen, Denmark
- Postal code: 1167
- Coordinates: 55°40′45.12″N 12°34′18.12″E

Bispetorv (Danish: Bispetorvet) is a small public square in central Copenhagen, Denmark, located on the corner of Nørregade and Studiestræde. It takes its name from the Bishop's House, the official residence of the Bishop of Copenhagen, on the other side of Studiestræde. The square is dominated by the main entrance of Church of Our Lady which faces it on the other side of Nørregade. The Reformation Memorial which stands in the middle of the square is from 1943.

== History ==
Bispetorv was established in connection with C. F. Hansen's rebuilding of the Church of Our Lady after its destruction in the British bombardment of the city during the Battle of Copenhagen. As properties which occupied the site had also been destroyed, Hansen was successful in having the Establishment take over the lots, and he also designed the surrounding buildings.

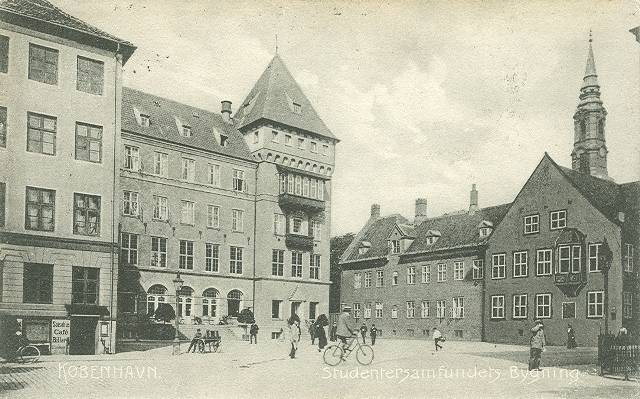
Bispetorv, c. 1902

Hansen's buildings were sold in 1899 and demolished to make way for a new building for Studentersamfundet, a student society which had been founded in 1882. The new building, was designed by C. F. Jeppesen og Carl Thonning in a National Romantic style at the corner of Studiestræde, topped by a steep pyramidical roof. In 1916 the building was sold and redesigned by Gotfred Tvede who removed the tower and adapted it to a more sober, Neo-Classical design. In 1949 the building was acquired by the University of Copenhagen, which already had a number of buildings in the area, and it became known as the Bispetorv Annex.

== Reformation Memorial ==
A monument in the centre of the square commemorates the Reformation of Denmark. It was inaugurated on 6 June 1943. The monument was designed by the sculptor Max Andersen and architect Harald Lønborg-Jensen. It consists of a column decorated with reliefs and inscriptions on all four sides. The reliefs present key events from the Reformation.

== See also ==
- Parks and open spaces in Copenhagen
