= Grundtvigsk Forum =

Grundtvigsk Forum, formerly known as Kirkeligt Samfund af 1898 and Kirkeligt Samfund, is a Grundtvigian network affiliated with Church of Denmark. It is headquartered in Vartov in Copenhagen.

== History ==
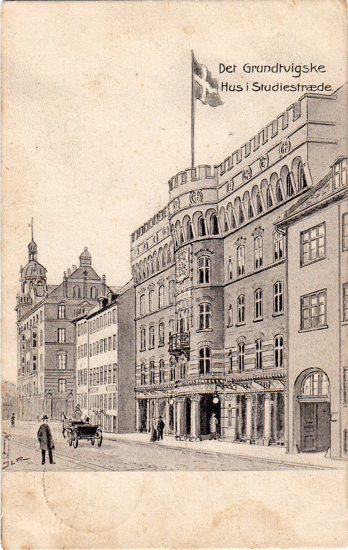
Grundtvigs Hus

Kirkeligt Samfund af 1898 was founded by right-leaning Grundtvigians in opposition to Indre Mission as well as left-leaning Grundtvigians. It achieved more influence than its actual support would suggest. The Grundtvig House, a new headquarters for the organisation, was built in Studiestræde in Copenhagen in 1908. The building was designed by Rolf Schroeder. The building was for many years used as a venue for meetings, debates and lectures. After World War II, it was ceded to Copenhagen Municipality in connection with Kirkeligt Samfund's acquisition of Vartov. The association gradually changed character and turned into am umbrella organisation for a number of Grundtvigian associations, communities, congregations and individuals.
