= Nybrogade 18 =

Building in Copenhagen

Nybrogade 24
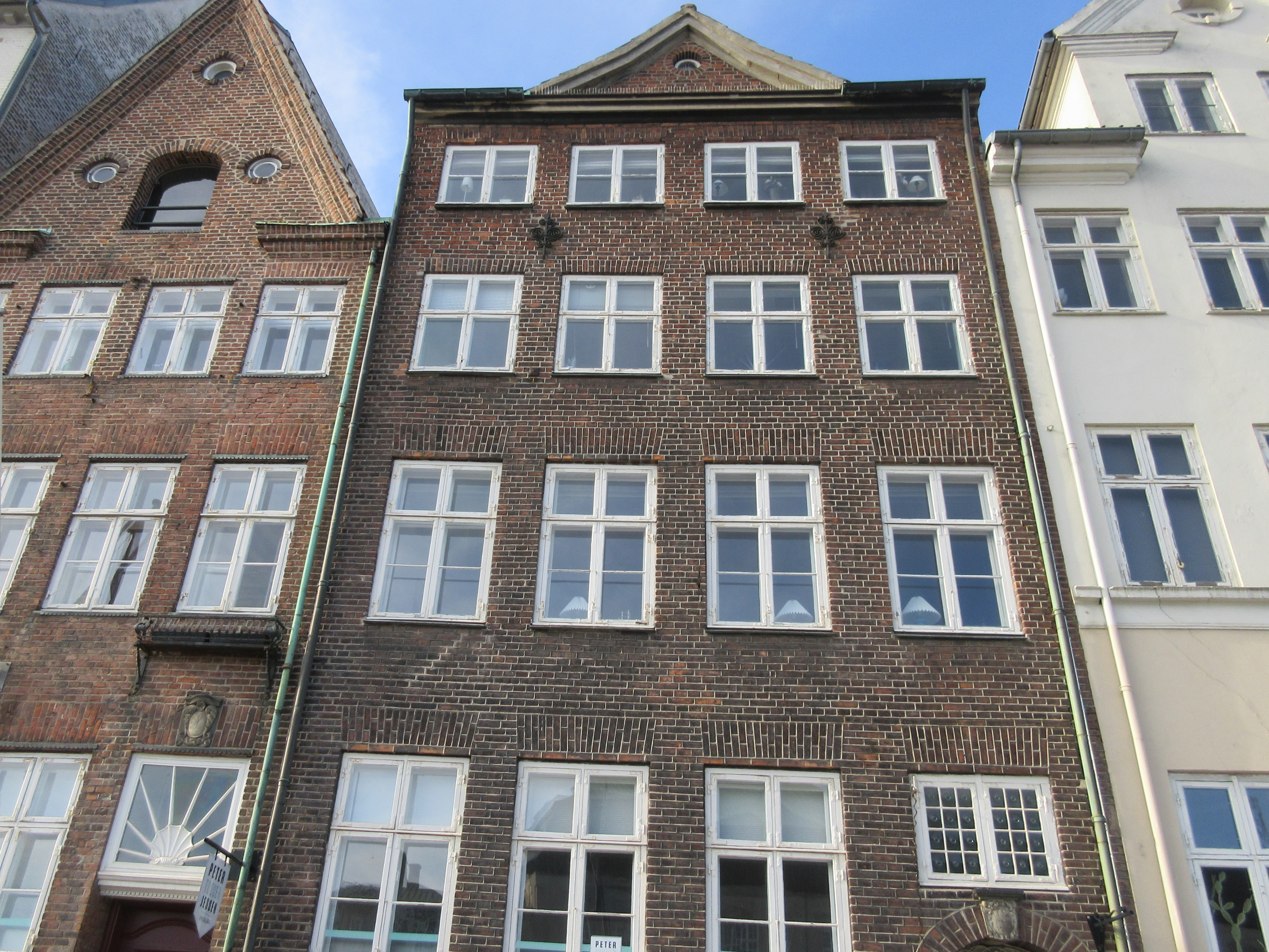
- Interactive map of the Nybrogade 24 area

General information
- Location: Copenhagen, Denmark
- Coordinates: 55°40′35.04″N 12°34′34.1″E
- Completed: 1732
- Renovated: 1754

Nybrogade 18 is an 18th-century canal house overlooking the Slotsholmen Canal in central Copenhagen, Denmark. The architect Vilhelm Tvede lived on the third floor as a child. The entire property was later owned first by him and then by his son Gotfred Tvede. It was listed in the Danish registry of protected buildings and places in 1918.

== History ==
=== 17th century ===
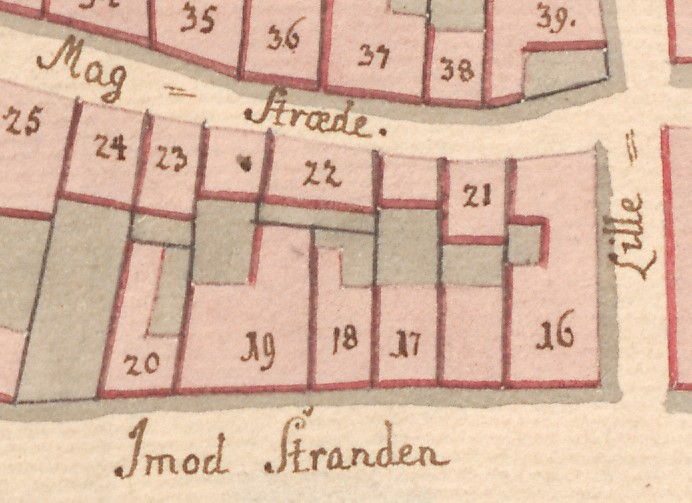
No. 16 seen on a detail from Christian Gedde's map of Snaren's Quarter, 1757.

Nybrogade 18 was listed in Copenhagen's first cadastre of 1689 as No. 26 in Snaren's Quarter, owned by Icelandic merchant Poul Hansen. The present building on the site was built in 1732 for Frederick IV's coachman Christen Christensen Dam and his wife Karen Sørensdatter. The property was listed in the new cadastre of 1756 as No. 17 in Snaren's Quarter and was still owned by Christen Dam at that time.

The property belonged to Girth Diderek Jørrensen at the time of the 1787 census. He worked for the Almindelige Enkekasse (General Widow's Fund). He lived there with his wife Henre Jette, their three children (aged one to eight), two nieces, a wet nurse, 43-year-old Anne Barebar /widow), 25-year-old Karen Lytke, a caretaker and a lodger.

=== 1800–1840s ===
Nybrogade 18 was later taken over by Abel Marie Sommer (née Hamon), widow of Supreme Court justice Hans Morten Sommer. The only other residents were a chamber maid (husjomfru) and a maid. She and her husband had resided in the building at corner of Nytorv and Rådhusstræde at the time of the 1787 census.

The property was again listed in the new cadastre of 1806 as No. 17 in Snaren's Quarter. It was owned by one captain Berg at that time.

The architect Gustav Friedrich Hetsch (1788-1864) lived in the building from 1818 to 1822.

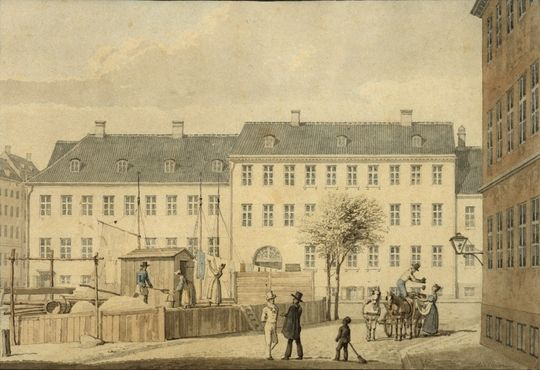
H.G.F. Holm: The "Sandbox" at Nybrogade, 1835.

The property was home to 18 residents in four households at the 1840 census. Christian Gottlieb Korn (1891–1853), a senior clerk (fuldmægtig) in Rentekammeret, resided on the ground floor with his wife Ane Tobine Korn (née Bøtcher, 1803–1859), their two children (aged three and four) and one maid. Gertrude Cathrine Beck, a widow, resided on the first floor with two of her children (aged 19 and 23), her sister Charlotte Frederikke Smith and one maid. Anna Charlotte Christine Thochen, another widow, resided on the second floor with her son Christian Larsen Thochen (theology student) and one maid. Ane Marie Larsen, a third widow, wjo operated a shop in the basement, resided in the associated dwelling with her two children (aged 16 and 18) and two lodgers. The western end of Nybrogade (at Grederiksholms Kanal) was the site of the so-called "Sandbox" /Sandkisten), a storage facility for sand. The sand was transported to the site by barge. It was then sold by the sand traders to the so-called "sandmen", who drove around with their carriages. Women would then call down to them from the windows: "Hey Sandman, come up with a skæppe!" (1 skæppe = 17.3 liter).

=== Tvede family ===
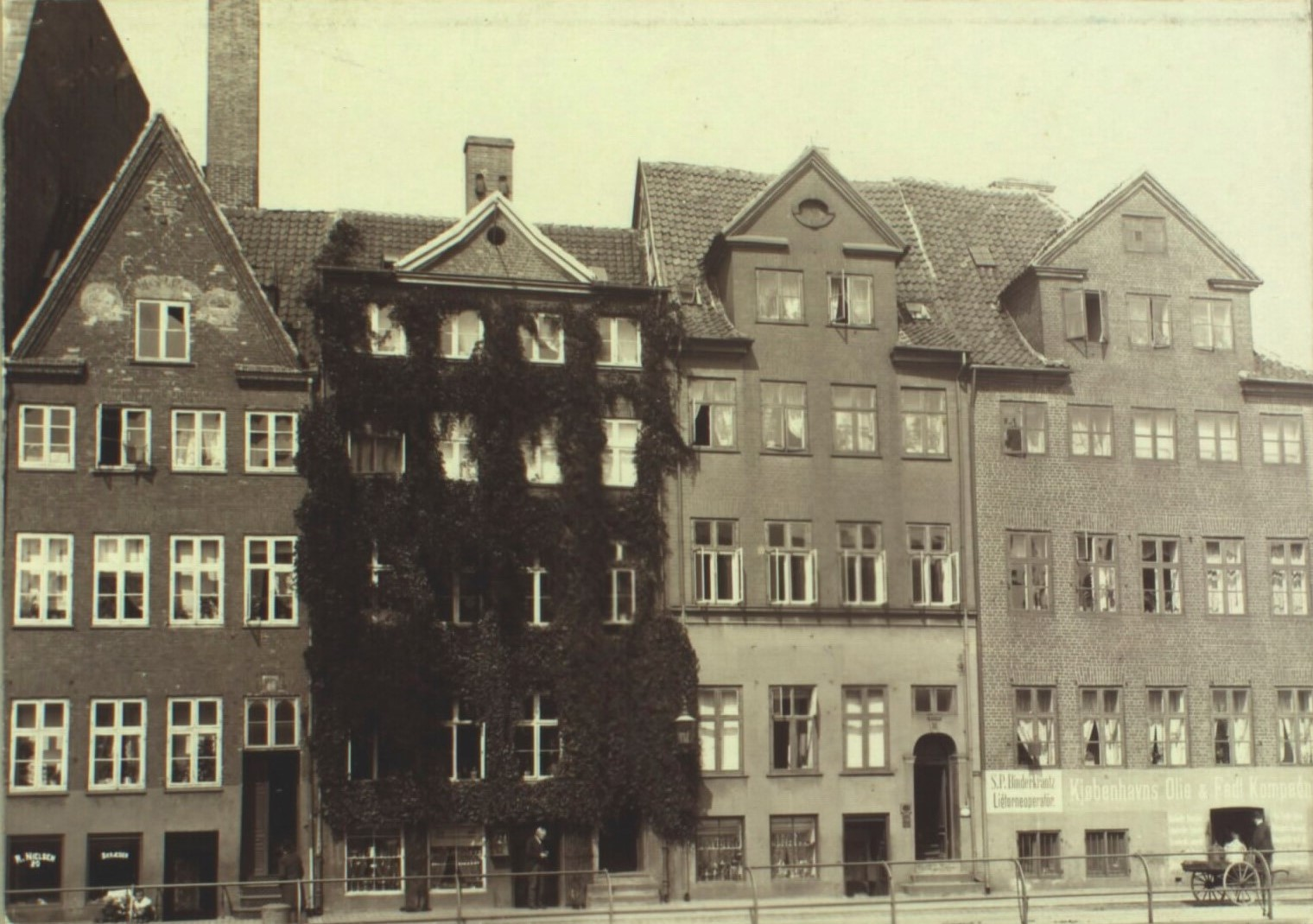
No. 18 photographed by Kristian Hude

Johan Frederik Tvede, a master shoemaker, resided at the time of the 1850 census with his wife and two sons on the third floor. The elder of the two sons was the architect Vilhelm Tvede. He was married in 1857. The couple was at the time of the 1860 census living with their two daughters in the apartment on the second floor. Vilhelm Tvede's younger brother, Christiann, a mechanician, was still living with his parents in the apartment on the third floor. The building was at this point home to a total of 21 people.

Vilhelm Tvede is from at least 1880 mentioned as the owner of the building. His family, now with five daughters and one son, was by then occupying the first, second and third floor. The son Gotfred Tvede (1863-1947) would also become an architect. He was 31 August 1895 married to Marie Dorph Petersen, daughter of actor and theatre director Jens Frederik Siegfried Dorph Petersen. He lived in the house in Nybrogade until his death. The only other residents at the time of the 1906 census was an antiques dealer, Theodor Ludvig Schandorff, who resided with his wife and daughter in the basement. Gotfred Tvede lived in the building until his death in 1947.

=== Later history ===
The composer Sven Gyldmark (1904-1981) resided on the third floor from 1946 to 1956.

As of 2023, Nybrogade 18 is owned by E/F Nybrogade 18. The basement houses a café. There is one condominium on each of the upper floors.

== Architecture ==
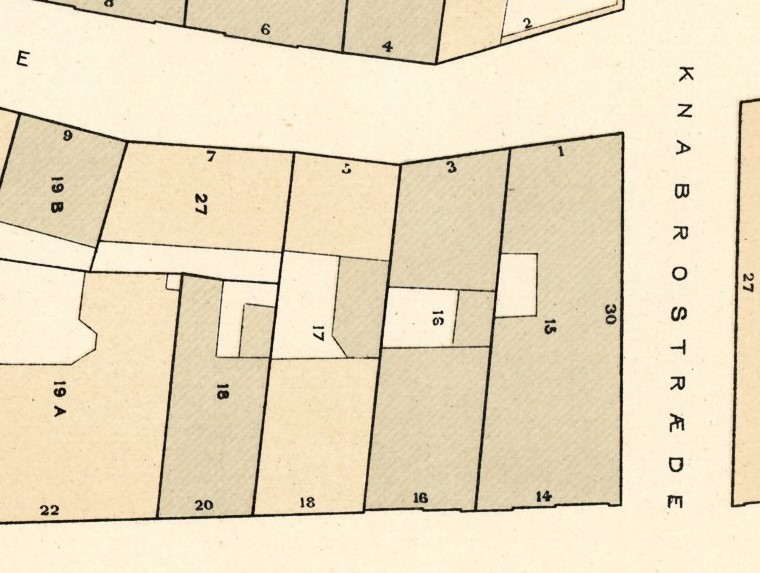
Nybrogade 18 seen on a detail from Berggreen's cadastral map of Snaren's Quarter, 1884.

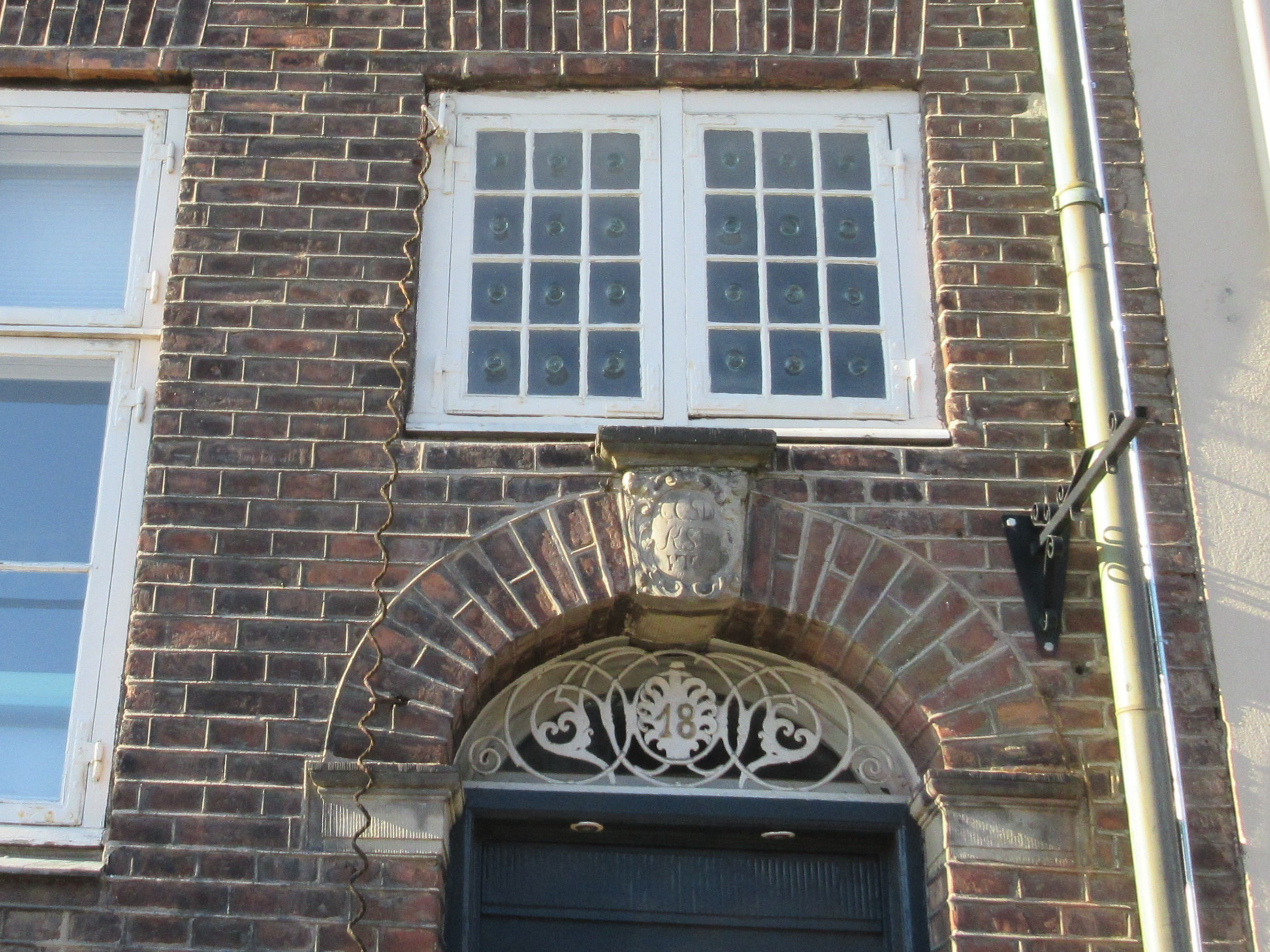
Detail of the transom window

Nybrogade 18 was originally constructed with three storeys over a Walk-out basement and is just four bays wide. The lower part of the roof was towards the street replaced by a mezzanine in 1854. The front side of the building is constructed in undressed red brick, with white-painted windows, save the overground portion of the cellar which is plastered and has blue-painted windows. Two decorative Fleur-de-lis wall anchors are seen between the windows on the two upper floors. The main entrance is placed in a flat arched opening. The keystone and imposts of the arch are made of sandstone. The blue-painted door is topped by a transom window. The transom window is fronted by a decorative lattice screen. The door is accessed via a short flight of granite steps.

A four-storey, perpendicular side wing, with brown-painted timber framing and bargeboards and ocre-coloured infills, extends from the rear side of the building along one side of a small courtyard. The rear side of the main wing is constructed in brick but also finished with ocre-coloured plastering. The building's main staircase is located in the side wing.

== Gallery ==
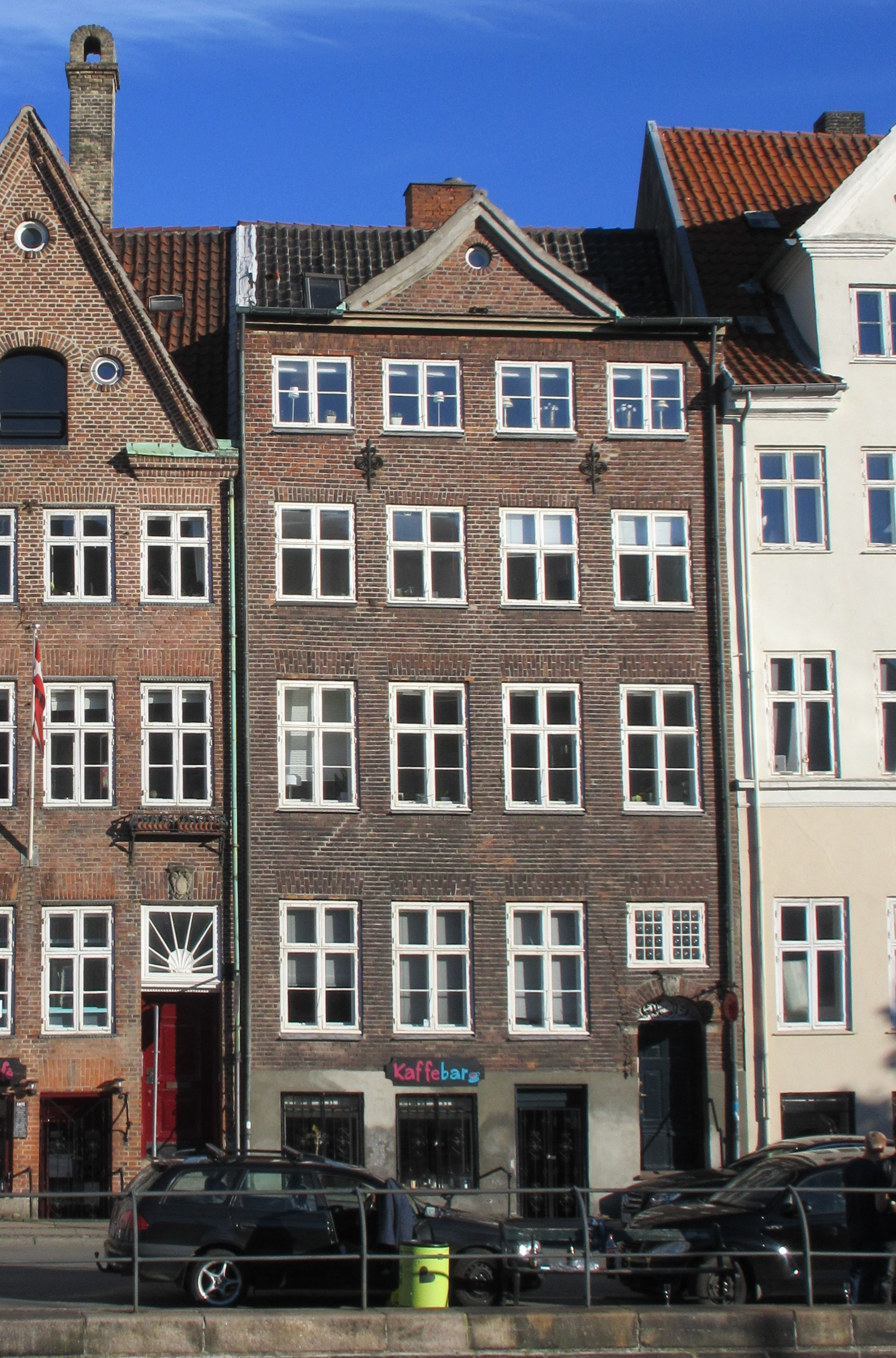
Nybrogade 18

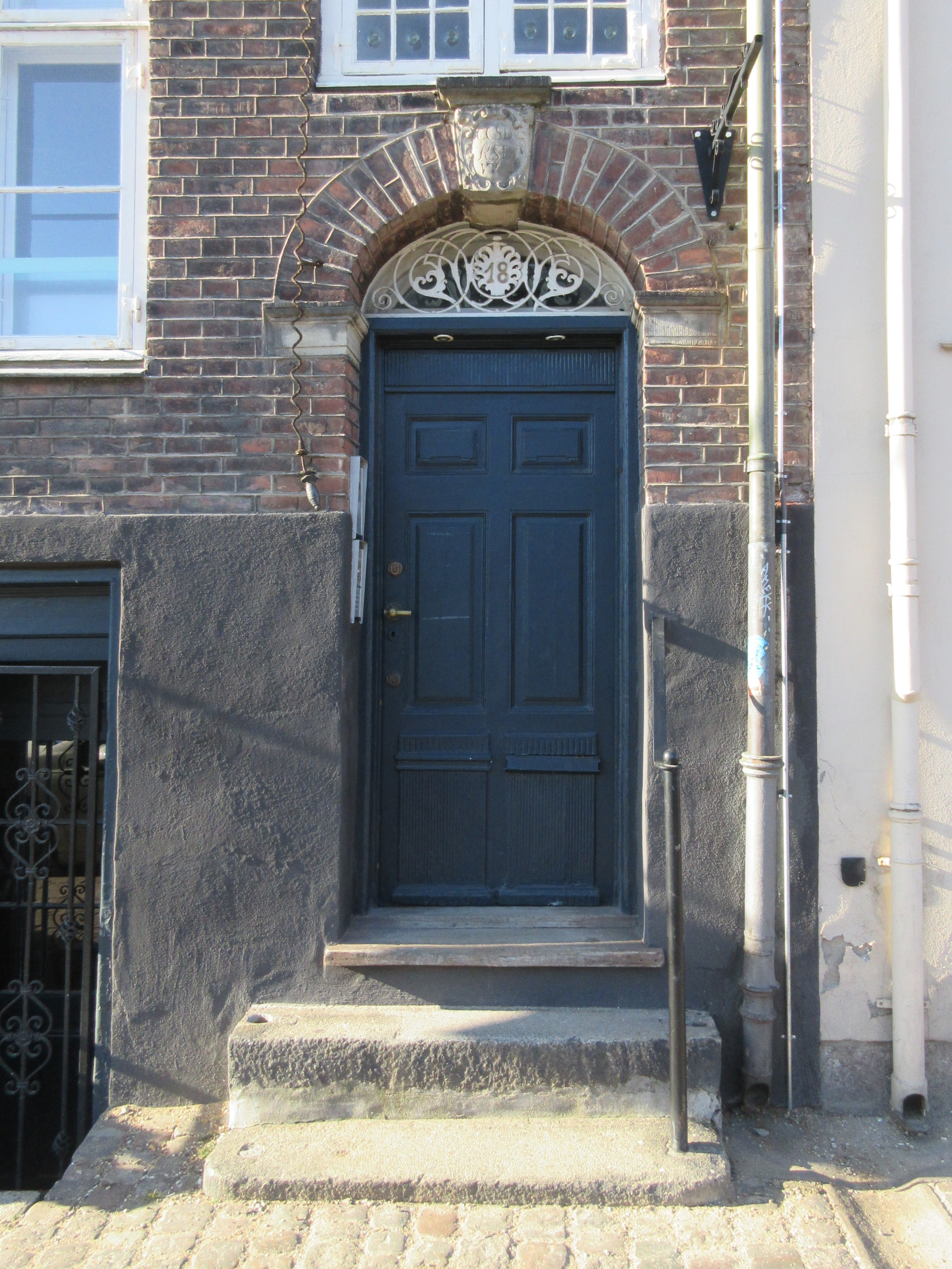
Main entrance
