= Kronprinsessegade 4 =

Building in Copenhagen, Denmark

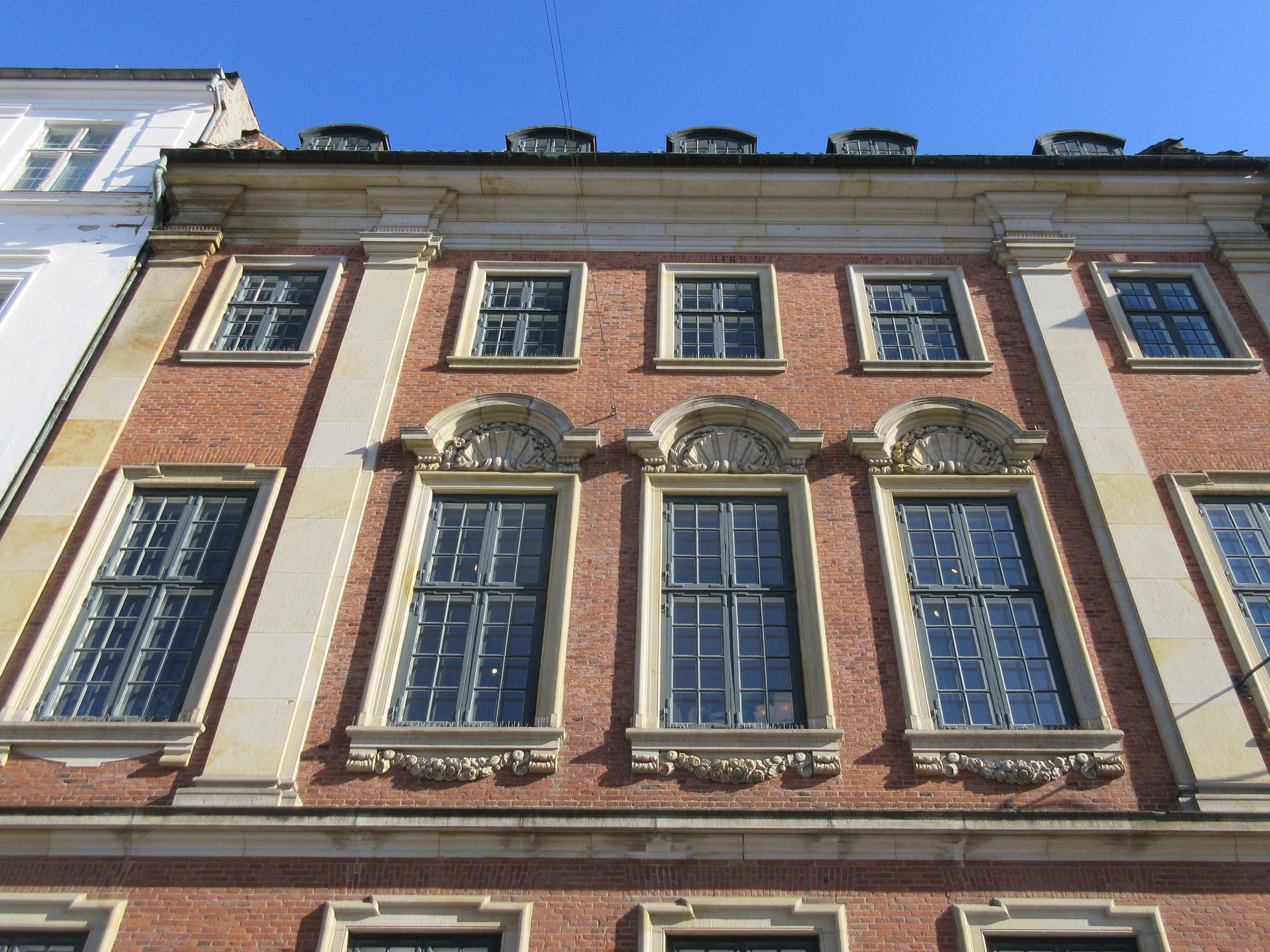
- Interactive map of the Kronprinsessegade 4 area

General information
- Location: Copenhagen, Denmark
- Coordinates: 55°40′58.5″N 12°34′52.0″E
- Completed: 1806

Design and construction
- Architect: Johan Martin Quist

Kronprinsessegade 4 is a Baroque Revival style building overlooking Rosenborg Castle Garden in central Copenhagen, Denmark. The building owes its present Baroque Revival style facade to an adaptation carried out in 1912 by Gotfred Tvede for antiques dealer Carl Julius Petersen. Danske Kvinders Velfærd (DKV), a Christian-social organisation for women, was based in the building from 1925 to 1945.

== History ==
=== Construction ===
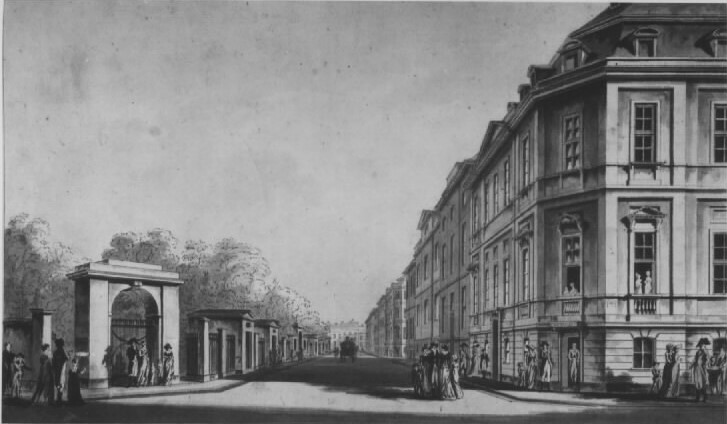
The Lars Larsen House in 1804

The property was initially referred to as Lot 3 when Kronprinsessegade was created in the years after 1800. The property's first owner was Christian Aasted. His property was listed in the new cadastre of 1806 as No. 384 in St. Ann's West Quarter.

=== 1830–50 ===
The property was home to at least two households at the 1834 census.

Conrad Weidemann, a wholesaler (grosserer), resided on the ground floor with one maid. Julie Eskildsen (née Lose, 1784–1838), widow of former director of the Royal Greenland Trading Department Peter Andreas Eskildsen (1778–1825, buried in Holmen Church), resided on the first floor with her daughters Louise and Julie (aged 17 and 28), two maids and the lodger Marcus Pauli Hvass (1801–1864. legationssekretær and owner of Randrup Manor).

The property was home to four households at the 1840 census. Frederik Loumann, a royal clerk (kongelig fuldmægtig), resided on the ground floor with his wife Anne Sophie (née Benthien), their two children (aged one and three) and one maid, Frederikke Petzold (née Lose), a widow, resided on the first floor with the lodger Carl Ludvig v. Warnstedt and one maid. Vilhelm v. Kragh, a kammerjunker and secretary in the Department of Foreign Affairs, resided on the second floor with his wife Charlotte Larsen, one male servant and one maid. Andreas Rosenstand (1804–1873), bookkeeper at the Royal Greenland Trading Department, resided on the third floor with his wife Laura (née Wellmann, 1815–1885), their two children (aged zero and two) and two maids. The sisters Karen Boll, Ellen Margrethe Boll and Juliane Boll resided in the basement.

The property was home to four households at the 1845 census. Frederekke Petzold, widow of a kommerceråd, resided on the first floor with the lodgersChristian Friederich Adoph Ostvald (Doctor of Lay) and one maid. Wilhelm Krag, secretary of the Department of Foreign Affairs, resided on the second floor with his wife Charlotte Margrethe Krag, their five-year-old son, one male servant, and two maids. Marie Andrea Sehested Krag and Sophie Augusta Krag, Conventualinde at Roskilde Convent and Vemmetofte, respectively, resided on the ground floor with one maid. Jacob Peter Frederiksen, a barkeeper, resided in the basement with his wife Ane Margrethe Frederiksen as well as the concierge Margrethe Grünevaldt, Grünevaldt's wife Elisabeth Grünevaldt and their daughter Vilhelmine Grünevaldt.

=== 1850s ===
Anne Christine Buntzen (1778–1859) lived in one of the apartments from 1951 to 1859. Her niece Elisabeth Hennings (née Buntzen) has described her apartment in her memoirs.

=== Carl Julius Petersen ===
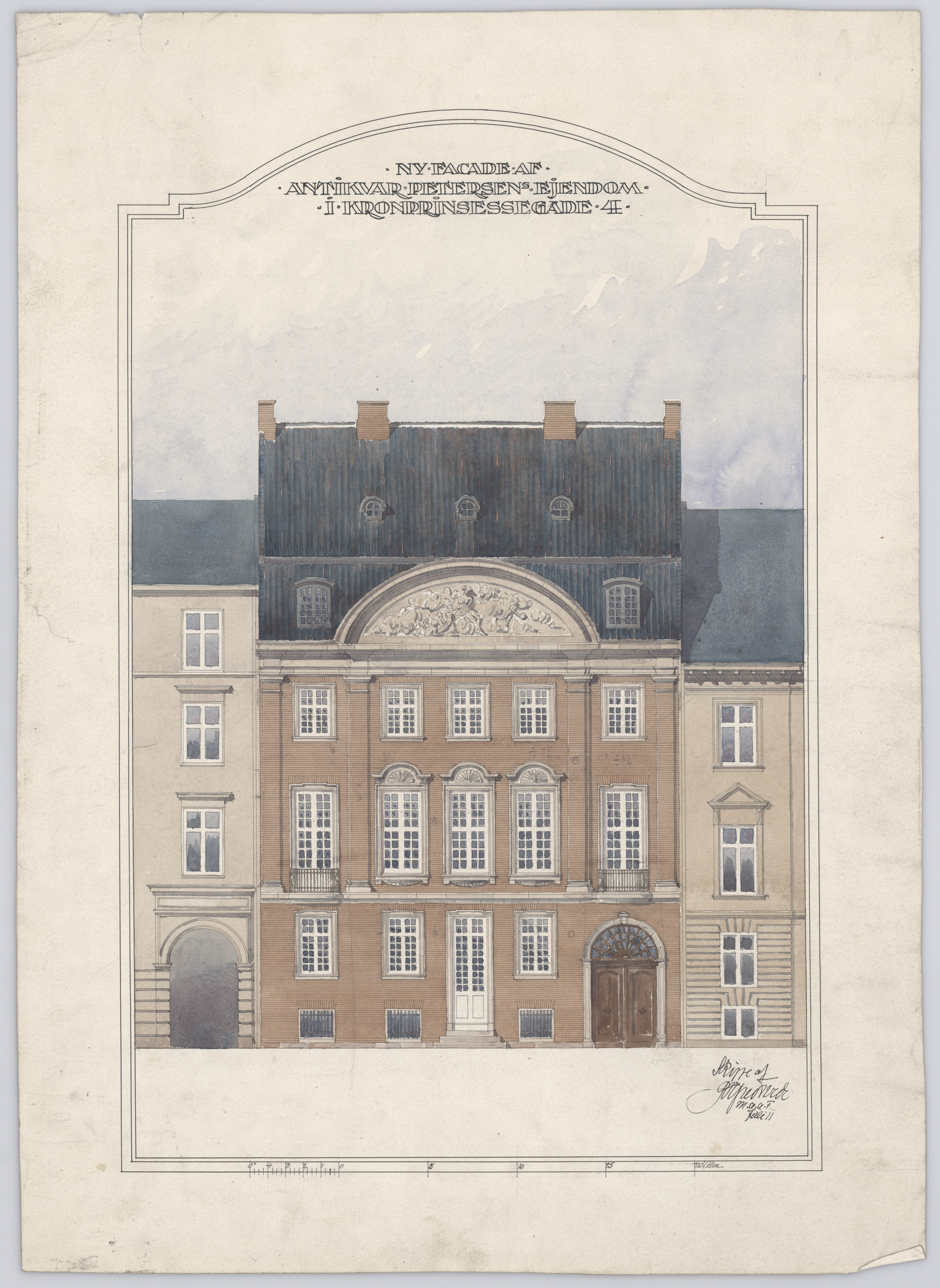
Drawing of the new facade

The property was at some point acquired by artiques-and-art dealer Carl Julius Petersen. He and his sister Amine Christiane Petersen occupied on the ground floor and first floor of the building at the 196 census. Cathrine Louise Elizabeth Mas resided in the second-floor apartment with one maid. Two lawyers named Jersild resided in the third-floor apartment.

In 1912 Carl Julius Petersen charged Gotfred Tvede with renovating the building. The facvade was adapted to the Baroque Revival style.

=== Danske Kvinders Velfærd ===
In 1925, Kronprinsessegade 4 was acquired by Danske Kvinders Velfærd (DKV), a Christian-social institution for women. Founded in 1922 under the auspices of the KFUK, DKV had just been incorporated as a self-owning institution. Ellen Nørgaard was responsible for the daily operations. She shared an apartment in the building with some of the other employees. In 1944, Nørgaard was succeeded by Manon Lüttichau as daily leader of the organisation. The institution was headed by Ellen Nørgaard. In 1945, DKV relocated to Nikolaj Plads 32.

== Architecture ==
Kronprinsessegade 4 is a three-winged complex constructed with three storeys over a walk-out basement. The building's facade was adapted to the Baroque Revival style by Gotfried Tvede in 1912. The favade was crowned by a segmentel pediment in Tvede's first proposal but this element was not part of the final design. The two outer bays are flanked by giant order pilasters on the two upper floors. The three central first-floor windows are topped by relief ornamentation. A gateway in the bay furthest to the right provides access to the central courtyard.

== Gallery ==

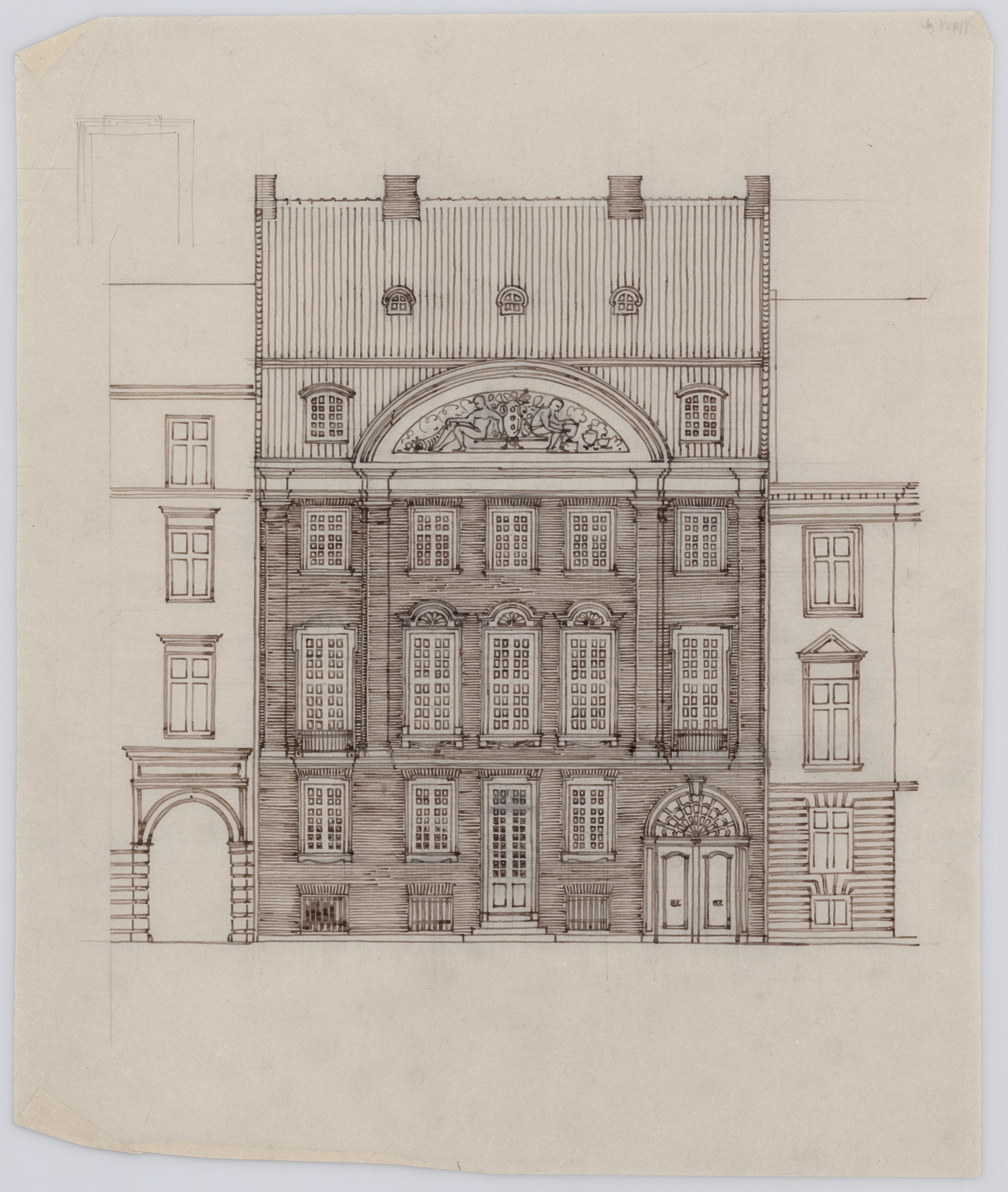
Alternative proposal

Plan drawing
