= Ascot Hotel Copenhagen =

Hotel in Copenhagen, Denmark

Ascot Hotel
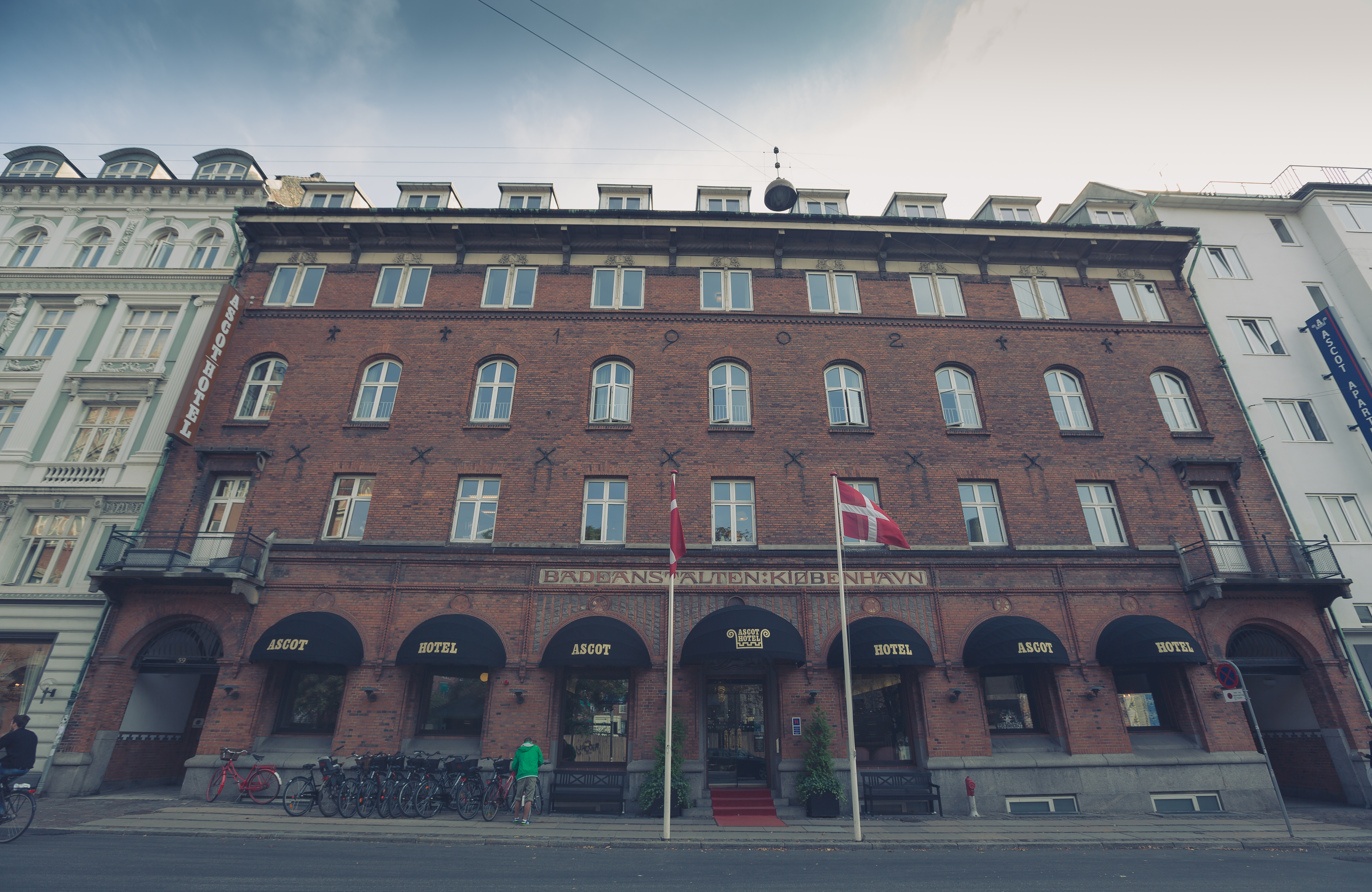
- Interactive map of the Ascot Hotel area

General information
- Location: Copenhagen, Denmark
- Coordinates: 55°40′36.8″N 12°33′54.9″E
- Opening: 1971; 55 years ago
- Owner: Hildebrandt Hammer Family
- Management: Hildebrandt Hammer Family

Technical details
- Floor count: 5
- Floor area: 5

Other information
- Number of rooms: 113
- Number of suites: 6
- Number of restaurants: 1
- Parking: Private Parking

Website
- Hotel web site

Ascot Hotel is a 4-star highend hotel located at Studiestræde 61 in central Copenhagen, Denmark. It is located in the former Københavns Badeanstalt (Copenhagen Public Bath House), a public bath house from 1901 to 1903, as well as in some of the adjacent buildings.

== History ==
Copenhagen Public Bath House was built at the initiative of a physician named Hjær. It was built in 1901–03 and designed by Gotfred Tvede and Valdemar Schmidt. The groundfloor contained a vestibule flanked by a restaurant and hairdresser's for men and women. The bathing facilities were located in the side wing while the premises on the upper floors of the main wing were let out to clinics. The bathing facilities were divided by gender. The section for women were located in the ground floor while the section for men was located on the first and second floors.

Hotel Ascot opened in the building in the early 1970s.

== Today ==
The hotel is owned by the Hildebrandt Hammer family and has 113 newly renovated rooms. The sister hotel- WIDE Hotel 4 star is located next door with 105 rooms & suites. The two hotels share facilities such as lobby, Josephines Bar, fitness, parking and restaurants.
