= Domus Medica =

Building in Copenhagen, Denmark

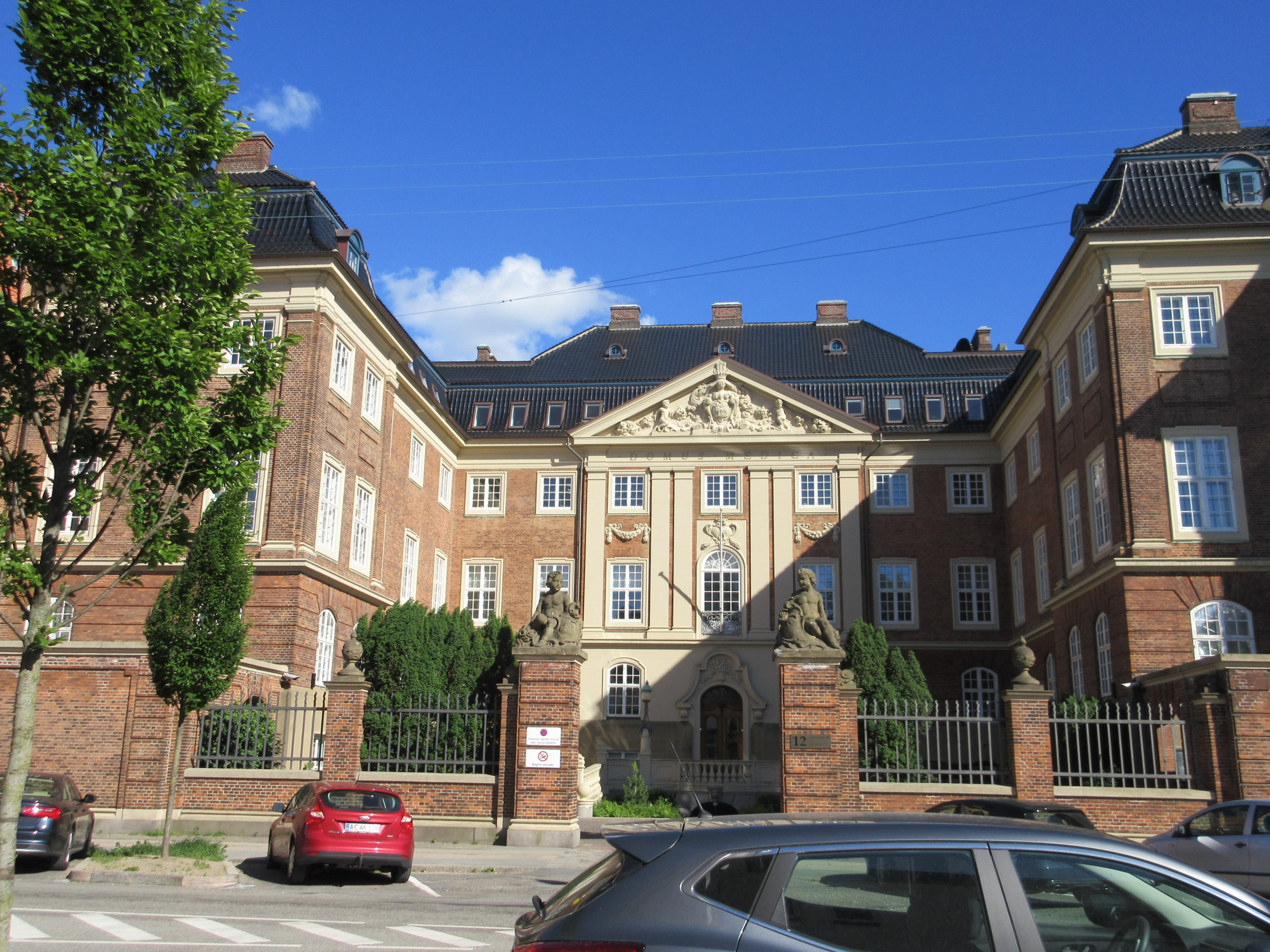
- Domus Medica from across the street
- Interactive map of the Domus Medica area
- Alternative names: Plessen Mansion

General information
- Architectural style: Baroque Revival
- Location: Copenhagen, Denmark
- Coordinates: 55°41′40.1″N 12°35′16.27″E
- Construction started: 1902
- Completed: 1906
- Client: Joseph von Plessen
- Owner: Danish Medical Association

Design and construction
- Architect: Gotfred Tvede

Domus Medica, located on Kristianiagade close to Østerport station in Copenhagen, Denmark, is the headquarters of the Danish Medical Association.

== History ==
The Plessen Mansion was built for the retired diplomat Joseph von Plessen in 1901-06. It was designed by Gotfred Tvede and became the last aristocratic town mansion built in Copenhagen. The Plessen family had previously owned an 18th century, Batoque-style town mansion at Frederiksholms Kanal but it had been converted into two Late Classical apartment buildings at Frederiksholms Kanal 16-18 in 1852-52.

With its 97 rooms, the house om Kritianiagade was too big for the Plessen family and the ground floor was therefore rented out to members of the foreign diplomatic corps. When Louise de Plessen and Erik Hasselbalch were married, they took over the first floor. Their daughter, Baroness Varvara Hasselbalch . a writer and photographer, was born in the house and grew up there in the 1920s and 1930s.

The Plessen Mansion was acquired by the Danish Medical Association after the end of World War II. The association had been based in a building in Amaliegade (No. 5) in Frederiksstaden. The building, a Rococo-style town house originally built by Nicolai Eigtved for tobacco manufacturer Ole Høgilds, was subject to Schalburgtage on the night between 7 and 8 June 1944 and never rebuilt.

== Architecture ==
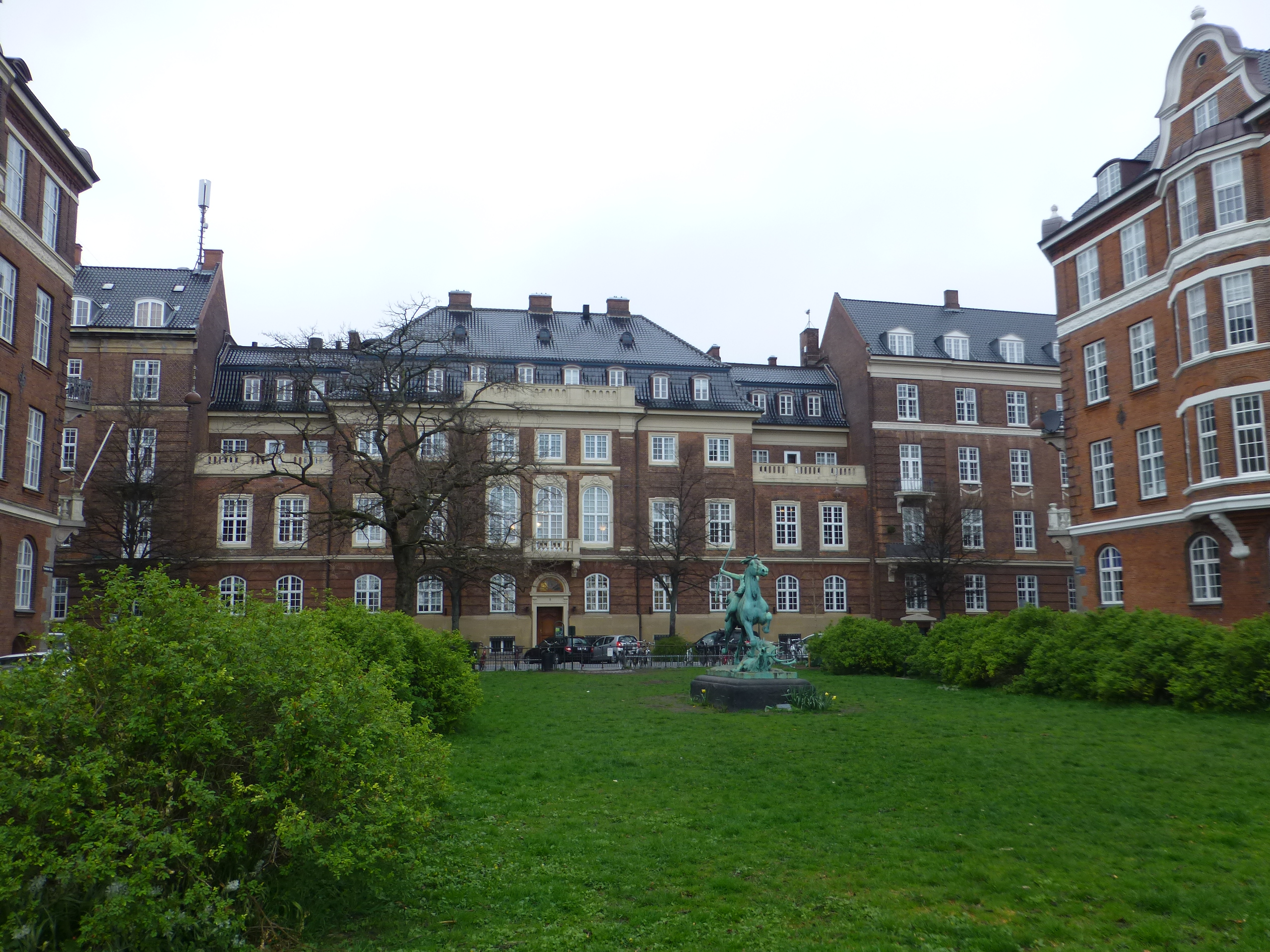
The facade facing Trondhjems Plads

Domus Medica is designed in the Neo-Baroque style. It is a three-winged, three-storey building with a Mansard roof covered in black-glazed tiles. The main entrance is located in a cour d'honneur on Kritianiagade. The rear side of the building faces Trondhjems Plads.

The interior includes the Great Hall, the Blue Room and the Library.

== Today ==
The Danish Medical Association is based on the second floor. Foreningen af Speciallæger and Yngre Læger (YL) are now based in the ground floor, Praktiserende Lægers Organisation (PLO) are based on the third floor and the medical journal Ugeskrift for Læger is based on the fourth floor..
