= Copenhagen City Hall (1479–1728) =

Coordinates: 55.6777°N 12.5729°E

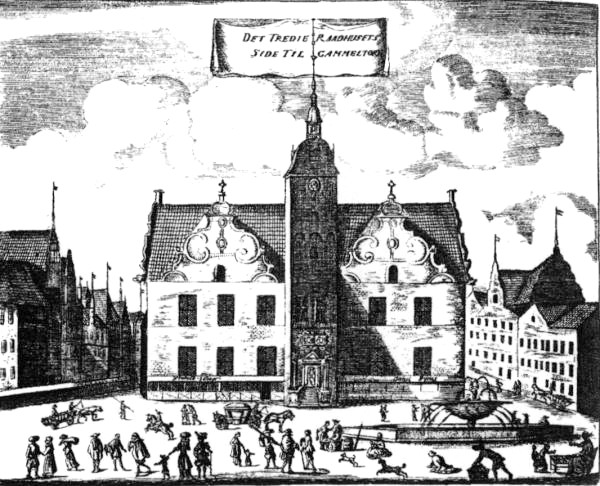
- Third Copenhagen City Hall, illustration from Rosens Atlas
- Interactive map of the Copenhagen City Hall area

General information
- Architectural style: Renaissance
- Location: Copenhagen, Denmark
- Construction started: 1479
- Completed: 1606—10
- Demolished: 1728

A new, third City Hall in Copenhagen, Denmark, was built at Gammeltorv in 1479. Rebuilt by King Christian IV into the Renaissance style in 1610, it was in use until 1728 when it was destroyed in the first Great Fire of Copenhagen. It was replaced by a new city hall which was built on its foundations the same year.

== Building ==
The new city hall at Gammeltorv was built as a replacement for the previous city hall located in Nørregade, at the site of the current Bishop's House, which was now taken over by the new Copenhagen University. It was built on the south side of the Gammeltorv but nothing is known about the appearance of the building during this early phase of its history.

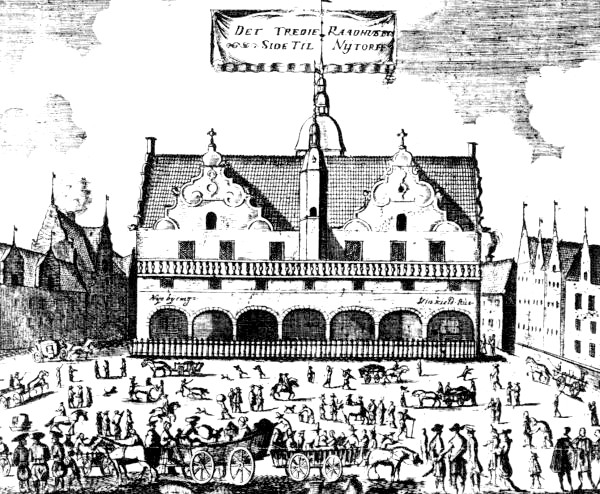
The City Hall after the rebuilding as seen from Nytorv

When King Christian IV ascended to the throne in 1588, it was with ambitions to strengthen Copenhagen's strategic role in the Baltic region and he soon embarked on a number of building projects such as the new Arsenal Dock, Rosenborg Castle, and the Børsen. The modest city hall, although still a relatively small building, was from 1608 to 1610 subject to a comprehensive adaptation into the Renaissance style to better match these new buildings. Erik Pontoppidan refers to it as a "new building". A projecting, octagonal staircase tower topped by a spire was built in the middle of the façade towards Gammeltorv. The tower had a Dutch gable on either side. The same gables were seen on the rear of the building, flanking a smaller tower. Also on the rear of the building, there was an open gallery beneath an external balcony.

== Use ==
Peder Hansen Resen, who was appointed lord mayor of Copenhagen in 1664, wrote several works about the history of Denmark and of Copenhagen. He is the principal source of knowledge about the use of the city hall. The byting, the governing assembly of the city, began to meet indoors in 1623, first in a small building on the square and from 1662 in the city hall. The building also contained a theatre. The cellar was used as a jail as well as a drinking establishment serving beer and wine.
