= Kristianiagade =

Street in Copenhagen

Indiakaj
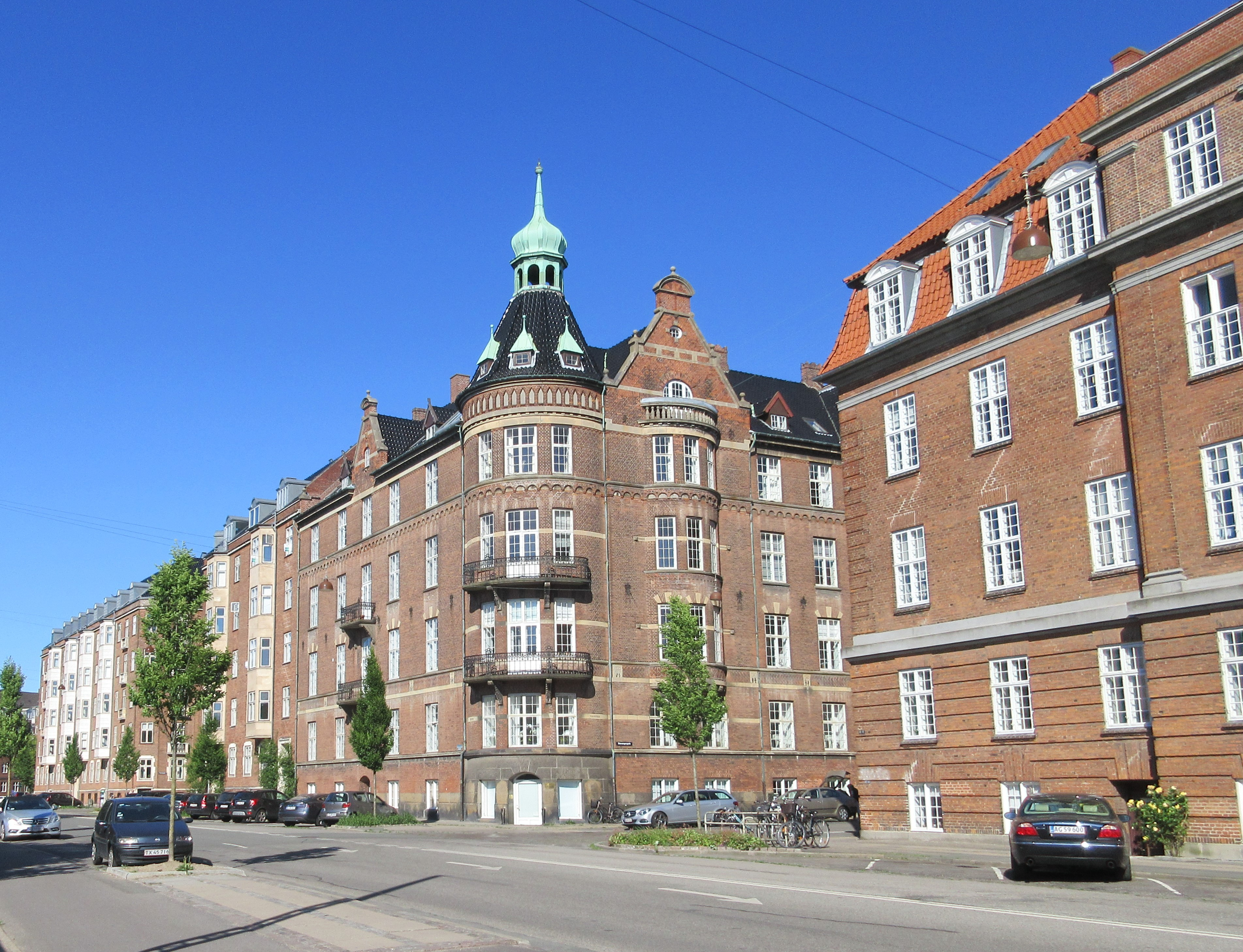
- Kritianiagade with the corner of Stavangergade
- Interactive map of Indiakaj
- Length: 450 m (1,480 ft)
- Location: Copenhagen, Denmark
- Postal code: 2100
- Coordinates: 55°41′41.64″N 12°35′15.36″E

Kristianiagade is a street located close to Østerport station in the Østerbro district of Copenhagen, Denmark. Buildings in the street include Domus Medica, a former noble town mansion which now houses the Danish Medical Association. The west side of the street is mostly lined with late 19th century villas of which several now serve as embassies. The street is named after the capital of Norway, Oslo (known as Christiania/Kristiania 1624–1925), in recognition of the close ties between the two countries that were part of Denmark-Norway until 1814.

== History ==
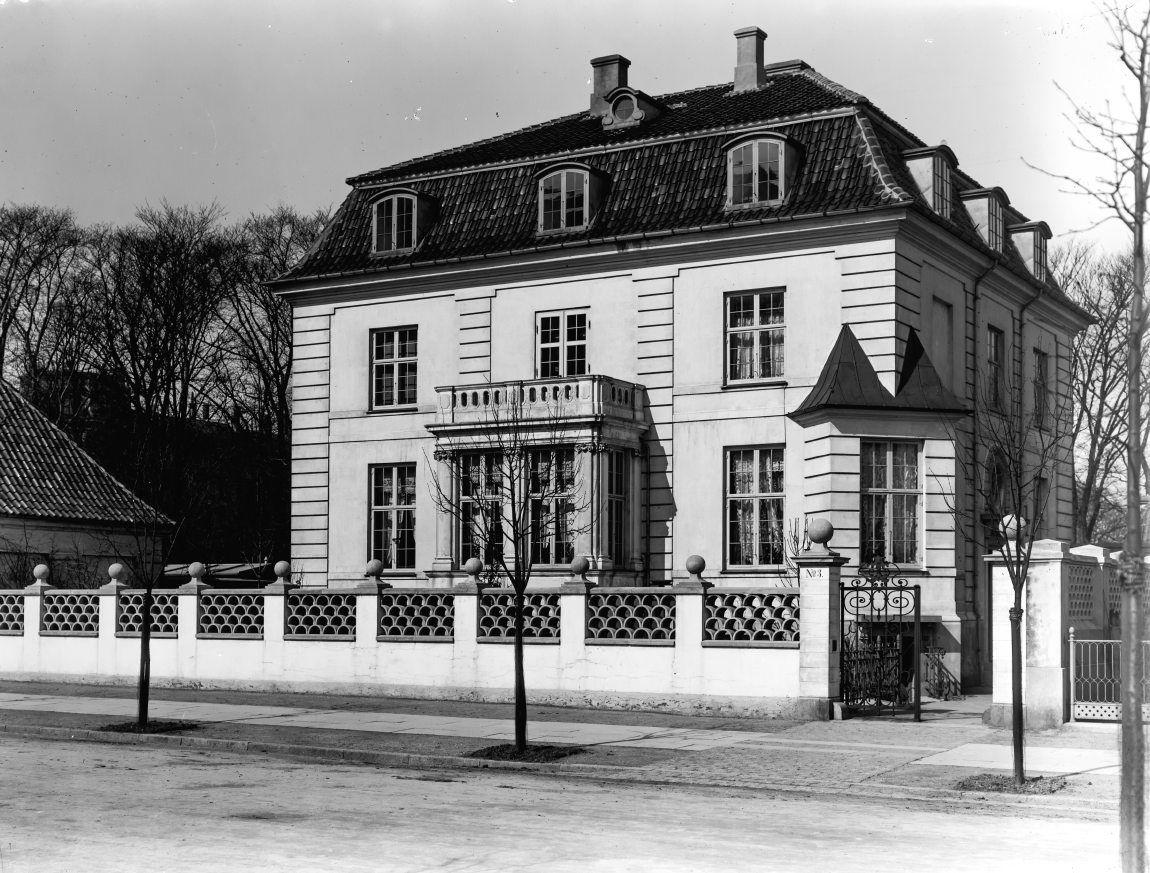
Kristianiagade 3 photographed by Frederik Riise

The street is located at the site of Grønlands Lynette (Greenland's Lunette, an outwork situated outside the ravelin in front of Copenhagen's former East Gate. It was built some time before 1728 and was located approximately at the corner of Bergensgade. It was not part of the deal when Copenhagen Municipality took over the rest of the city's decommissioned fortifications from the Danish state in 1770. It was instead used as a military training ground by the Royal Danish Army's engineering troops together with the rest of the glacis outside Kastellet.

The lunette was removed in 1896 in connection with the redevelopment of the glacis into a high-end residential area. Most of the streets in the area were named after Norwegian cities and landscapes. Kristianiagade takes its name after the old name for Oslo. Other street names in the area named after Norwegian localities include Bergensgade (after Bergen), Stavangergade (after Stavanger), Trondhjemsgade and Trondhjems Plads (after Trondheim, Hardangergade (after Hardanger) and Mandalsgade (after Mandal) .

== Notable buildings and structures ==
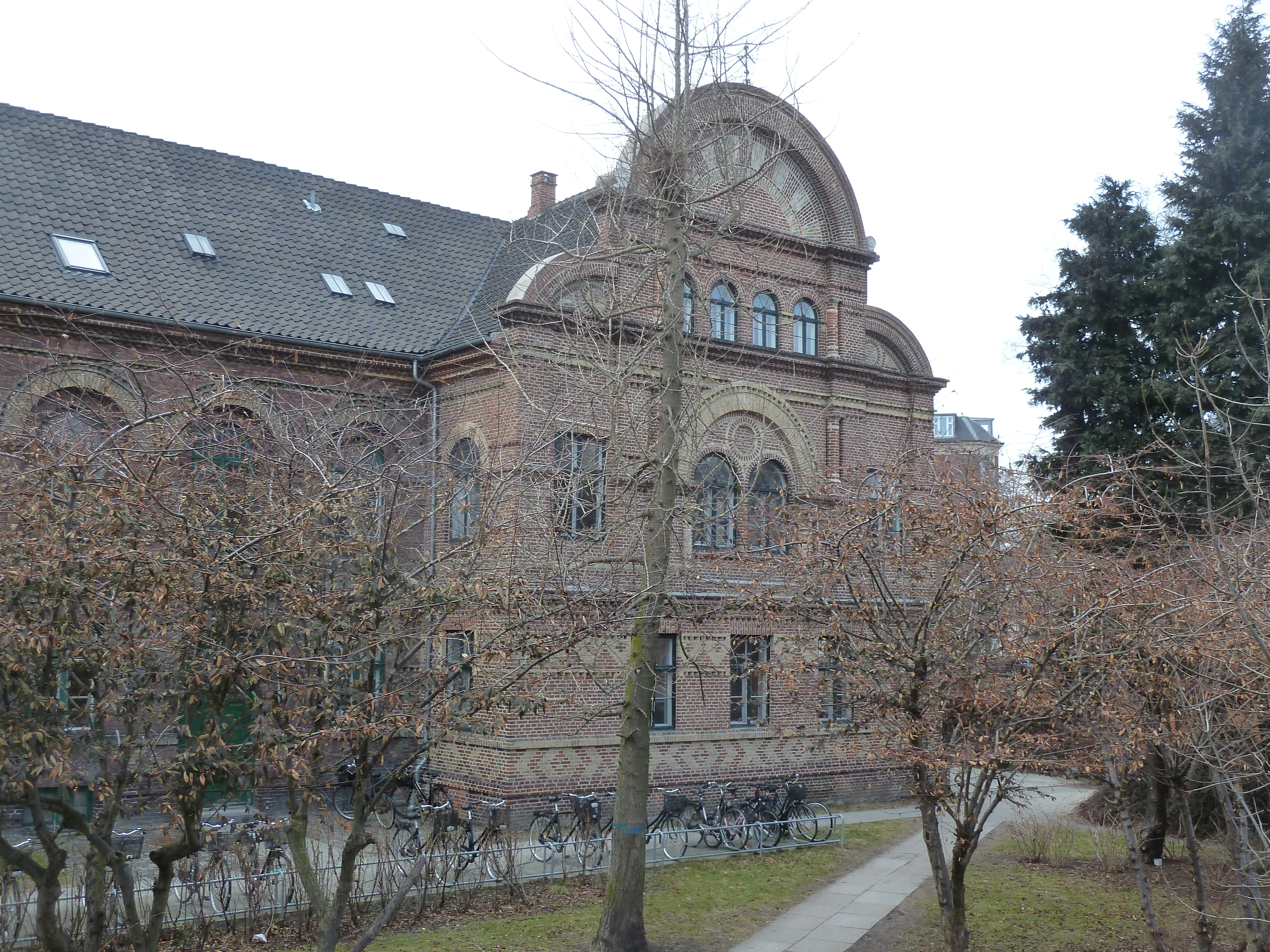
The former Institute for the Blind

Completed in 1858 to a Historicist design by Ferdinand Meldahl, the former Institute for the Blind, located in a depressed area on the west side of the street, is the oldest building in the area. It is located well below street level as a result of a dry moat which was located in front of Grønlands Lynette. The building now houses an institution for children.

Most of the other buildings on the west side of the street are villas from the 1890s and 1900s. The villa at No. 1 is from 1896 and was designed by Andreas Clemmensen. Otto Mønsted's villa at No. 5 was designed by Vilhelm Dahlerup. Magasin du Nord co-founder Emil Vett's next-door villa at No. 7 was completed in 1898 to design by Johan Schrøder. No. 5 and 7 and now houses the Russian embassy. The Egyptian embassy is based in the villa at No. 19 and the Spanish embassy is based in the villa at No. 21. The latter is from 1908 and was designed by Emanuel Monberg.

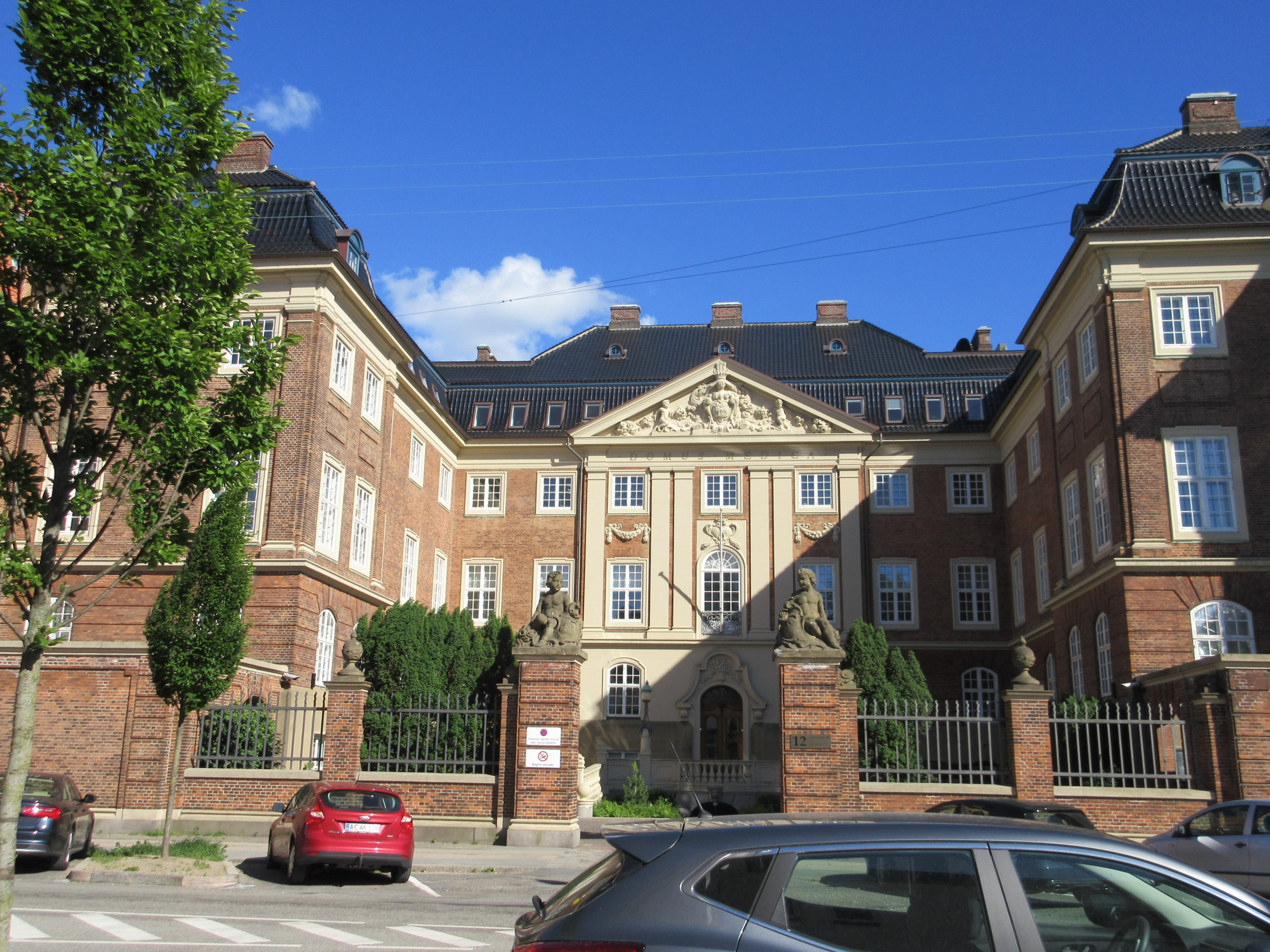
No. 12:Domus Medica

Domus Medica, formerly known as the Classen Mansion (Det Classenske Palæ), is a former noble town mansion built by a member of the Classen family. Completed in 1906, it was the last of its kind to be built in Copenhagen and with its 98 rooms also one of the largest. It received its current name when it was taken over by the Danish Medical Association in 1948 after their former headquarters on Amaliegade had been destroyed during the war.

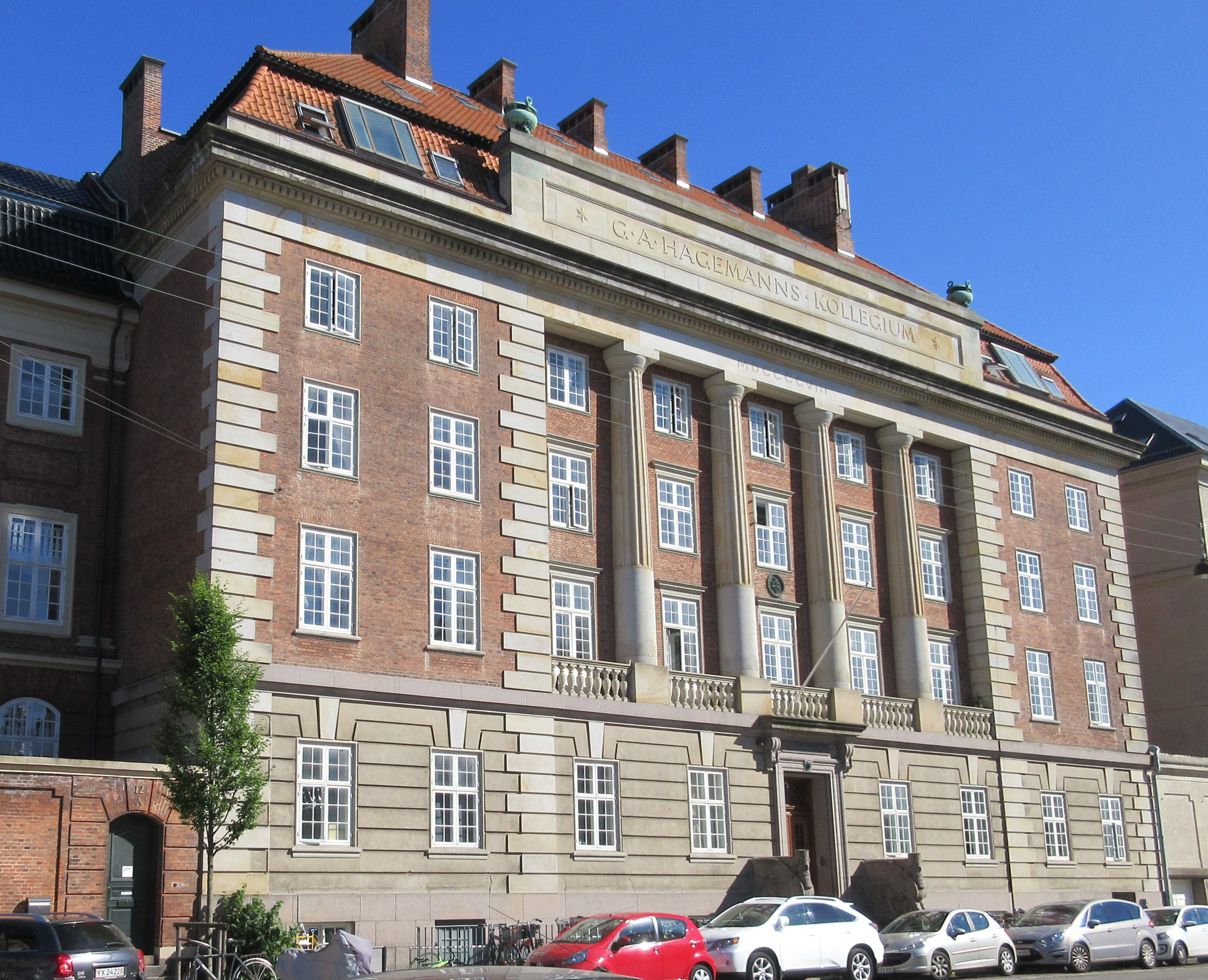
No. 10: G.A. Hagemanns Kollegium

G. A. Hagemanns Kollegium is a hall of residence founded by Gustav Adolph Hagemann in 1908. The building was designed by Albert Jensen. It provides accommodation for 62 students of which at least two thirds have to be from the Technical University of Denmark.

The building with the turret on the corner with Stavangergade (Stavangergade 6) was designed by Philip Smidth and is from 1907. He has also designed several other buildings in the area.

== Transport ==
The nearest railway station are Østerport, served both by S-trains and the Copenhagen Metro City Circle Line.

== See also ==
- Kastelsvej
