= Studiestræde =

Street in Copenhagen, Denmark

Coordinates: 55.6784°N 12.5689°E

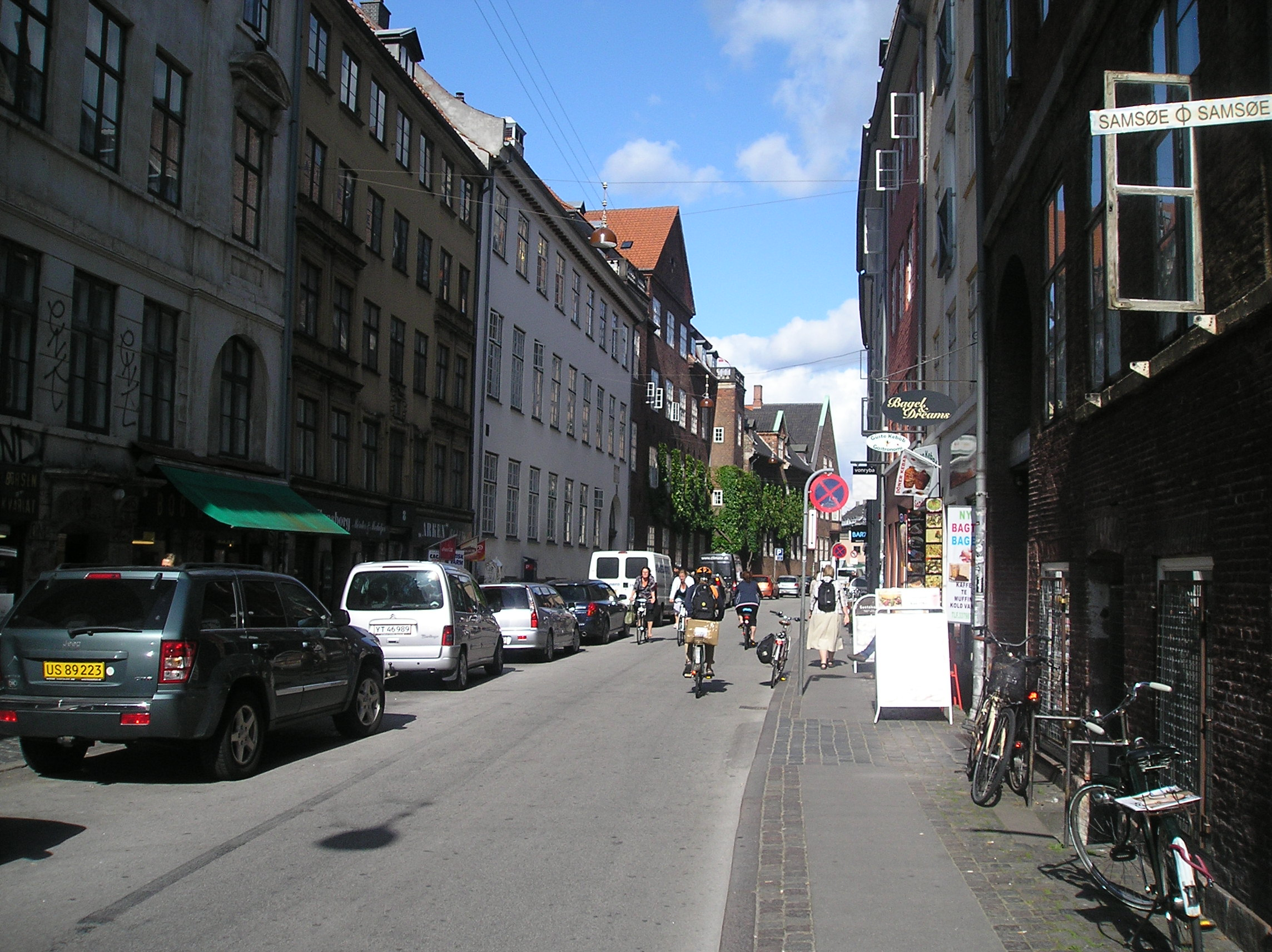
Studiestræde

Studiestræde is a street in central Copenhagen, Denmark, running from Bispetorv on Nørregade in the northeast to Axeltorv in the southwest. The oldest section of the street, between Nørregade and Vester Voldgade, is part of Copenhagen's Latin Quarter and is home to many small shops, galleries and cafés. Most of the buildings date from the years after the Copenhagen Fire of 1795. The rest of the street dates from an extension in the second half of the 19th century. It is bisected by H. C. Andersens Boulevard and is home to the music venue Pumpehuset.

== History ==
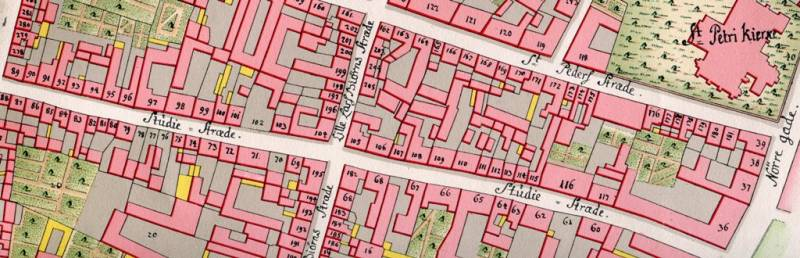
Studiestræde as seen on Gedde's maps of Copenhagen from 1757

Copenhagen 's second Town Hall was located at the beginning of the street which was then called Rådhusstræde ("Town Hall Alley"). In 1479, a new city hall was completed on nearby Gammeltorv and the old building was taken over by the University of Copenhagen which was founded the same year by King Christian I with the approval of Pope Sixtus IV. The name of the street was then changed to Gammel Rådhusstræde ("Old Town Hall Alley").

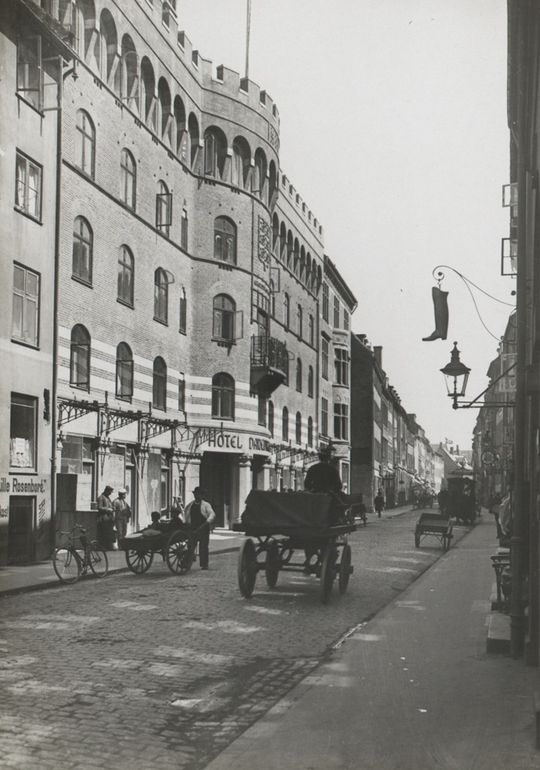
Studiestræde in the 1900s with Grundtvig House visible to the left

The street was destroyed both in the Copenhagen Fire of 1728 and in the Fire of 1795. The houses in the street were subsequently rebuilt.

The residents were mainly minor merchants and craftsmen. The street was extended when Copenhagen's Western Rampart was removed in the second half of the 19th century. Copenhagen Waterworks was built at the far end of the street in 1859. Am small park, Aborreparken, was established between the waterworks, Studiestræde, H. C. Andersens Boulevard and Vester Farimagsgade in 1886. A new building was inaugurated for Den Frie Udstilling in the park in 1889. In 1910, it was decided to abolish the park in anticipation of the construction of the new Boulevard Line. Den Frie Udstilling's exhibition building was dismantled and rebuilt at its current location next to Østerport station in 1913 when the construction of the railway began. The rest of the site was built over.

== Notable buildings and residents ==
Studiestræde 6 is part of the Studiegården complex, part of University of Copenhagen. The building at No. 6 was built as a professorial residence in 1795 and expanded with an extra floor in 1832. It was home to the Rechnical College (now DTU) from 1829 until 1890. Hans Christian Ørsted its first director and a driving force behind its establishment, had his home in the building from 1824 until his death. Most of the other buildings along the first section of the street (until Vester Voldgade) dates from the years after the Copenhagen Fire of 1795 and many of them are listed. One of the exceptions is the Grundtvig House, built for the Church Society of 1898 in 1908 and now home to the social housing administrator KAB.

Copenhagen Water Works' buildings from 1859 were designed by Niels Sigfred Nebelong. The installation remained in use until 1951. Studenterforeningen's building on the corner of H. C. Andersens Voulevard was built in 1910 to a National Romantic design by Ulrik Plesner. Ascot Hotel Copenhagen (No. 61) is located across the street from the waterworks. Next to it is another hotel, Hotel Alexandra, although its main entrance is on H. C. Andersens Boulevard (No. 8).
