= Gråbrødretorv =

Public square in Copenhagen, Denmark

Coordinates: 55°40′47″N 12°34′33″E

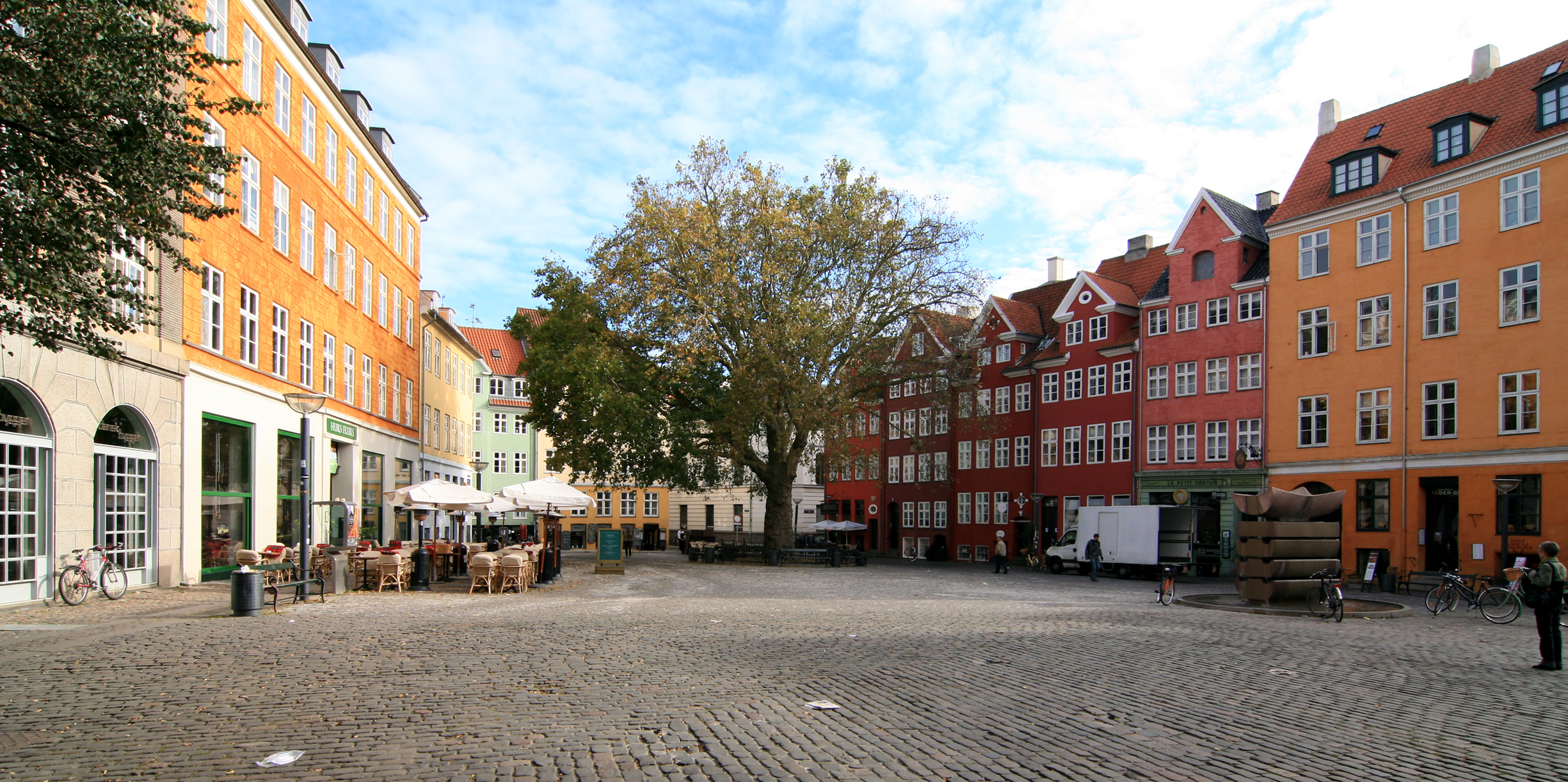
Gråbrødretorv

Gråbrødretorv is a public square in the centre of Copenhagen, Denmark, just off the pedestrian street Strøget.

== History ==
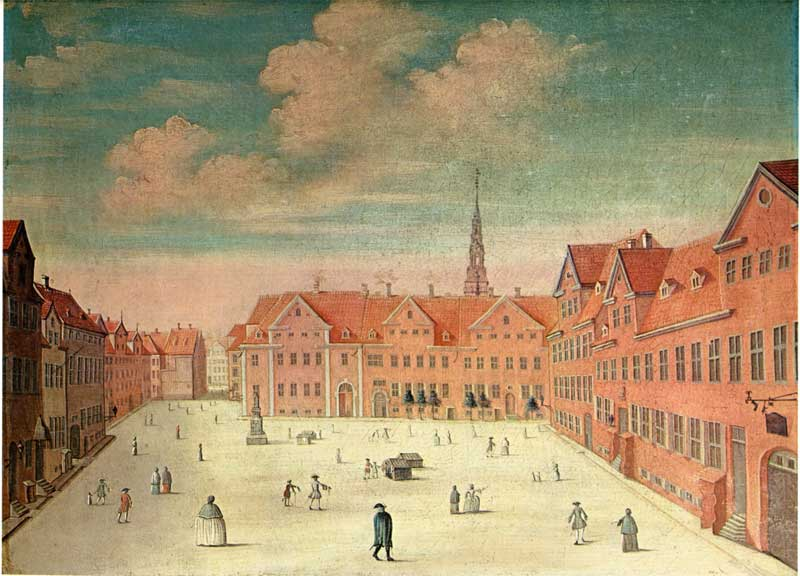
Ulfeldt's Square in 1748, painting by Johannes Rach and Hans Heinrich Eegberg

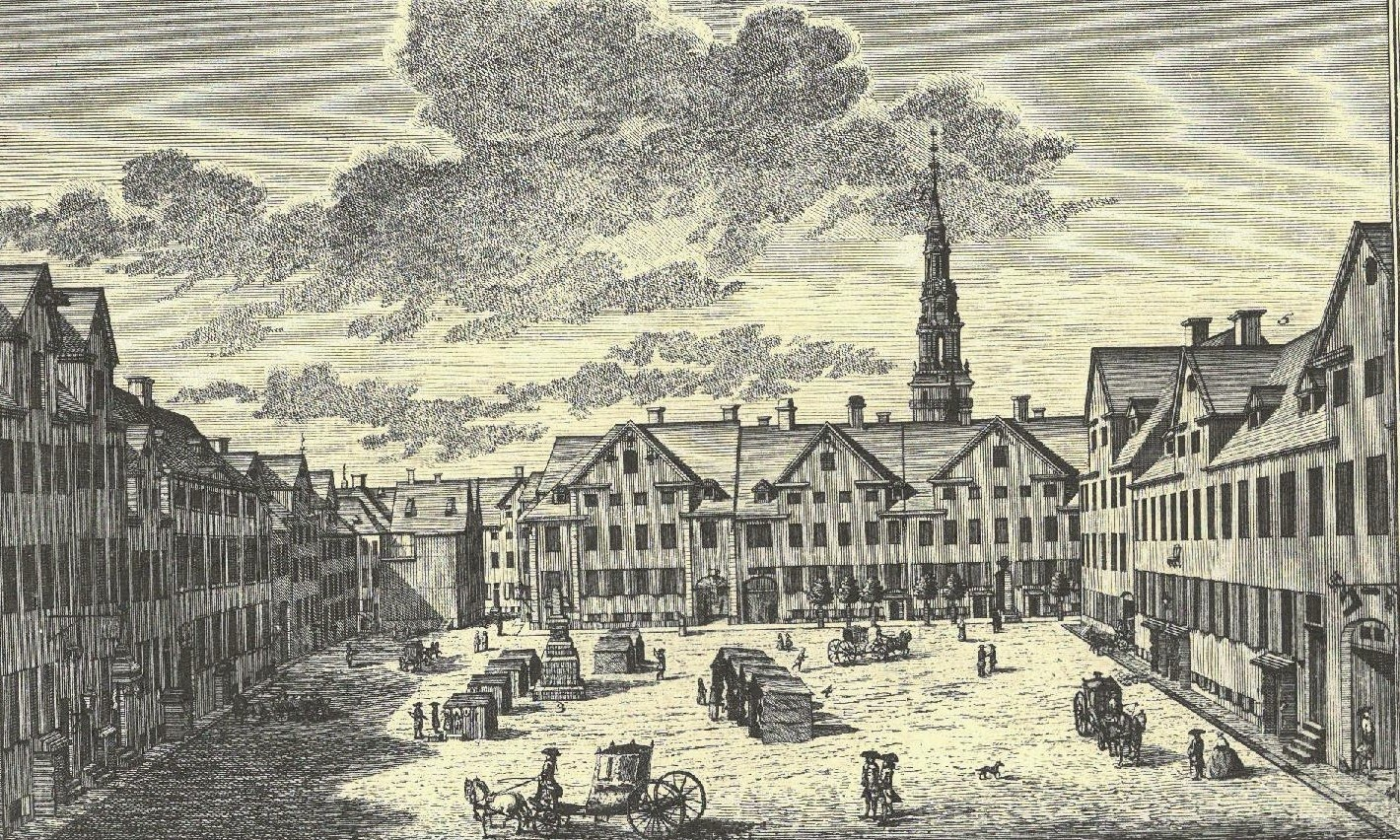
The square in 1755 by J. J. Bruun

Gråbrødretorv (Greyfriars Square) takes its name from a Franciscan friary, which was established at the site in 1238. The friary consisted at its height of a church, a refectory, a great hall which was used on many occasions for important state meetings and meetings of the provincial which governed Franciscan monasteries in Denmark. The friary was dissolved in 1530 but the church tower was a visible part of the city skyline as late as 1596. The huge cellars of the friary became the town jail and eventually the church itself was converted to a prison. In 1621 Christian IV added an orphanage and recommissioned the church as a house of worship, though it was called the "Prison Church".

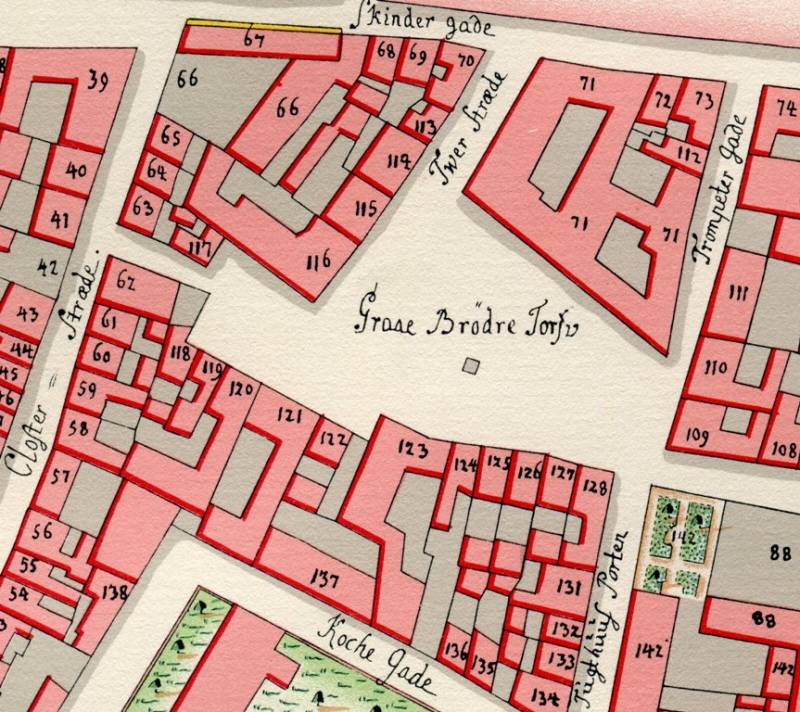
Gråbrødretorv (then spelled Graae Brødre Torv) on Gedde's map of Frimand's Quarter from 1757

In the middle of the 17th century, Corfitz Ulfeldt built a mansion at the site and the square became known as Ulfeldts Plads (English: Ulfeldt's Square). The mansion was demolished after his impeachment in 1663 and the subsequent confiscation of his property. Instead a pillar of shame was erected in the square to his disgrace, intended for people to spit on when passing it by.

At the Copenhagen Fire of 1728 practically all buildings around the square were destroyed. The area was rebuilt, but after the British bombardment of the city during the Battle of Copenhagen in 1807 it saw new devastation but was once again rebuilt.

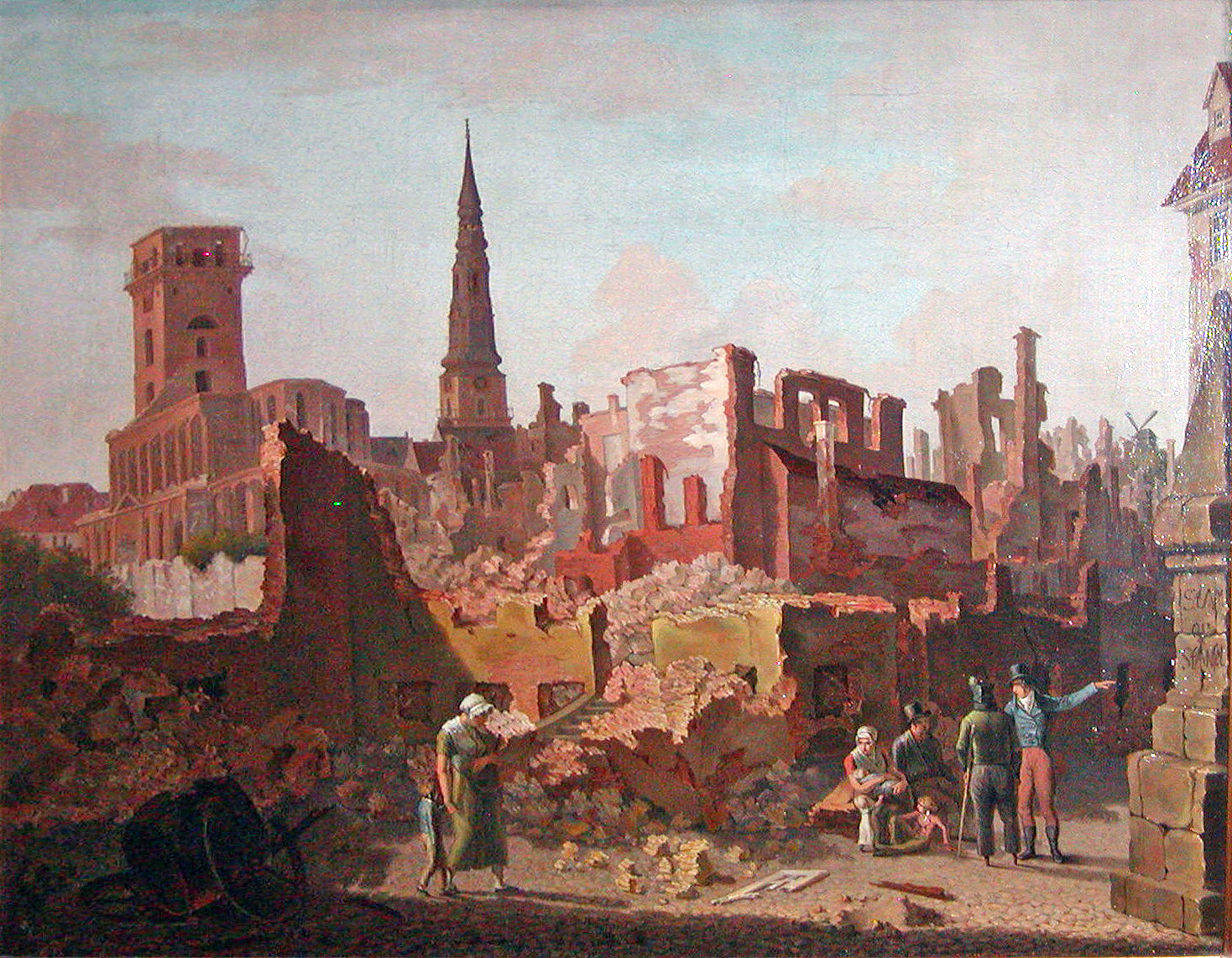
The square after the Battle of Copenhagen in 1807

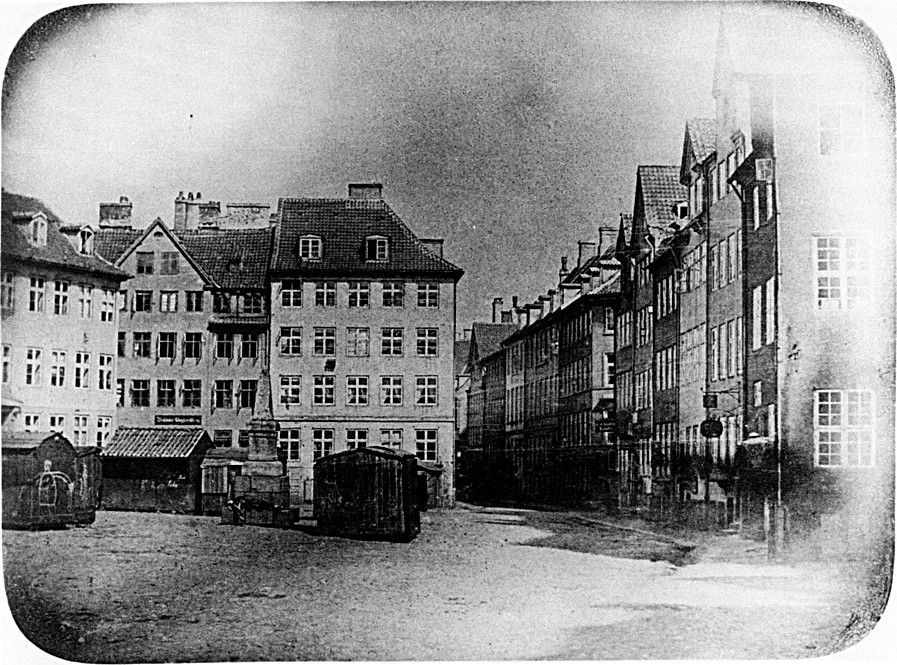
Picture of Gråbrødretorv (then called Ulfeldts Plads) in 1840

In 1841 the square received its current name. A market building with room for 20 butchers' stalls was erected in the square in 1852. It was built in cast iron from Frederiksværk. The building was removed in 1901.

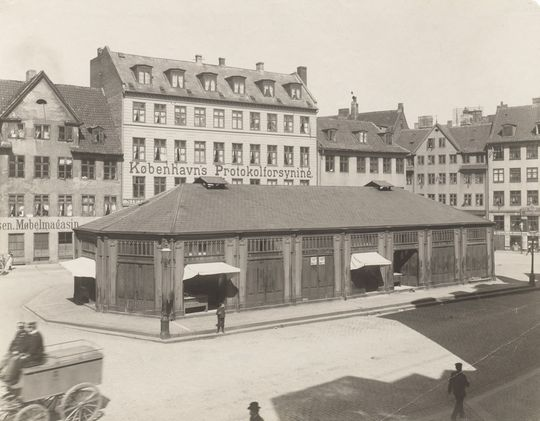
The market building in about 1900

For many years most of the square was occupied by a bunker surrounded by parking spaces. On 7 June 1968 it became car-free as part of first expansion of the pedestrian zone around Strøget; a number of air raid shelters left over from World War II were removed, as well as parking places. According to architects Jan Gehl and Lars Gemzøe the square was not initially very popular, but gradually became more and more popular, especially among students from the nearby University of Copenhagen. By the 1980s the square "was crowded almost beyond capacity throughout the outdoor season," although it has lost some of its popularity in recent years and is a comparably peaceful place now.

== Description ==
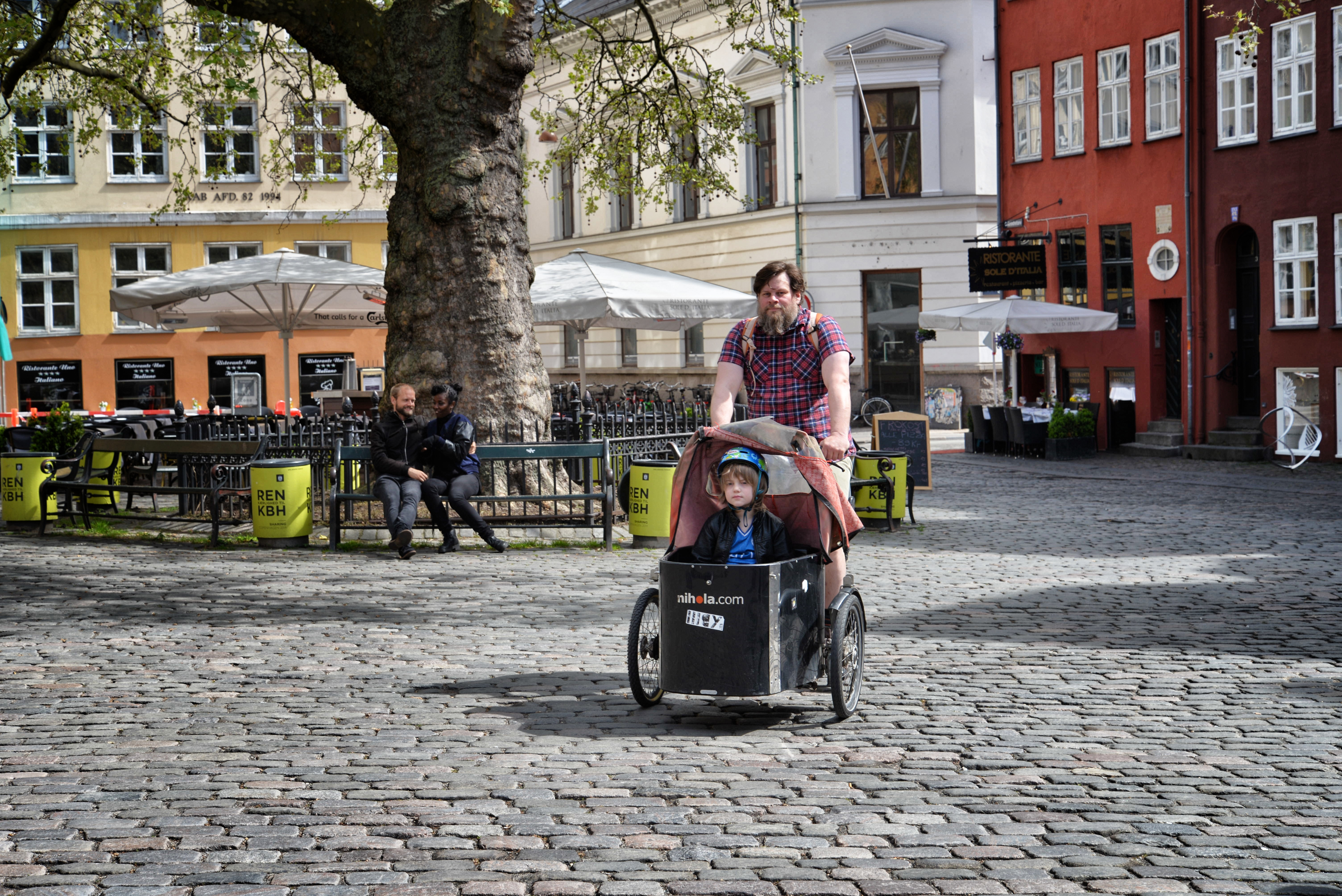
Cycling the square

The square has a somewhat hidden location. Niels Hemmingsensgade connects it in opposite directions to Amagertorv and Skindergade, Løvstræde connects it to Købmagergade to the east and Gråbrødrestræde connects it to Klosterstræde to the west. It has a surface area of 3,510 m^{2}.

The square is characterized by colorful house fronts and dominated by a large plane tree. There is also a fountain in granite, designed by Søren Georg Jensen and inaugurated in 1971. The square is lined by a number of restaurants with out-door service and is a popular venue for small out-door concerts, particularly during the Copenhagen Jazz Festival.

== Notable buildings and residents ==
The buildings on the south side of the square were built in the years after the fire of 1728. No. 8 is the former home of the German Sankt Petri Schule which is now located in Larslejsstræde.

The houses on the west side of the square were built after the British bombardment.

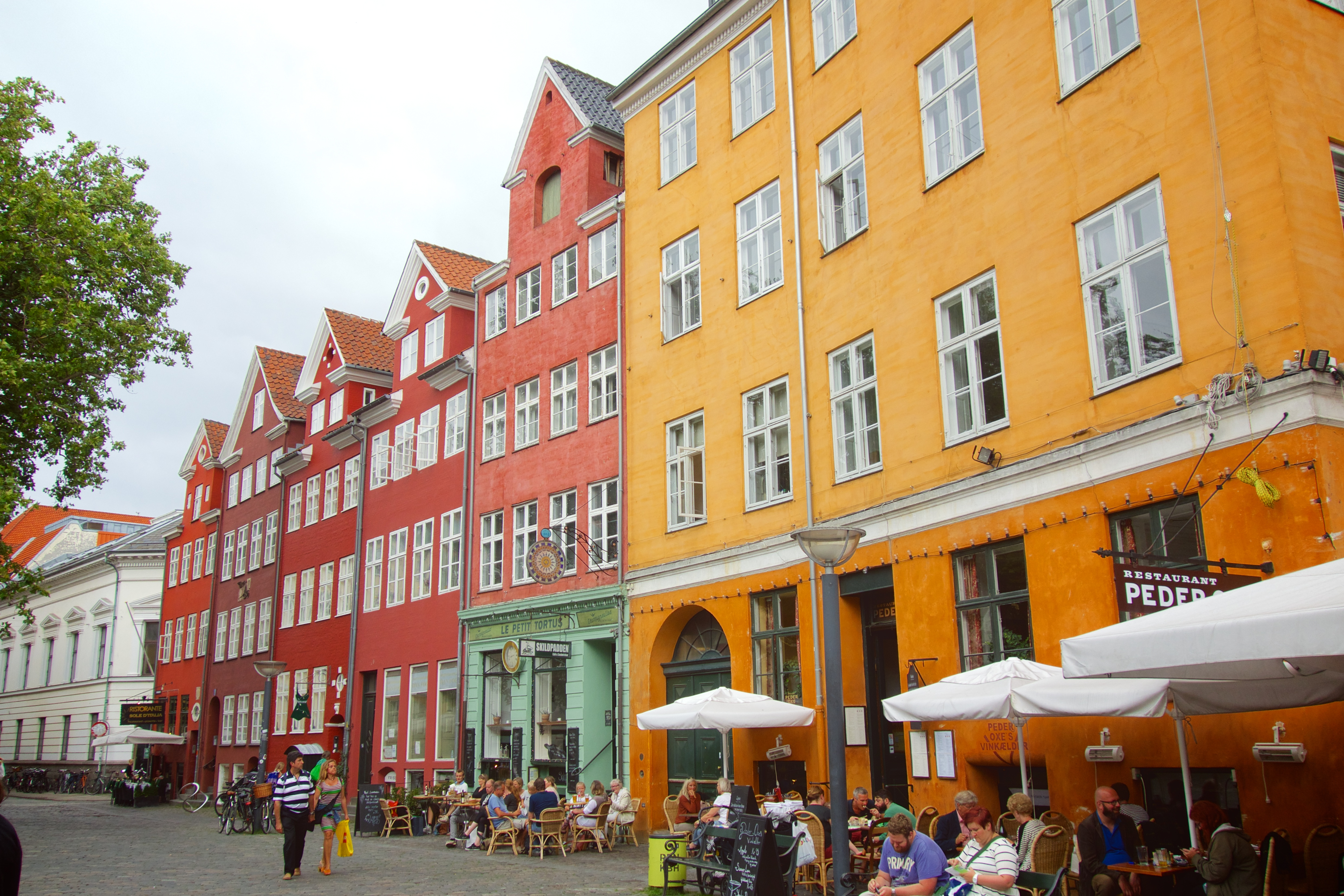
Facades

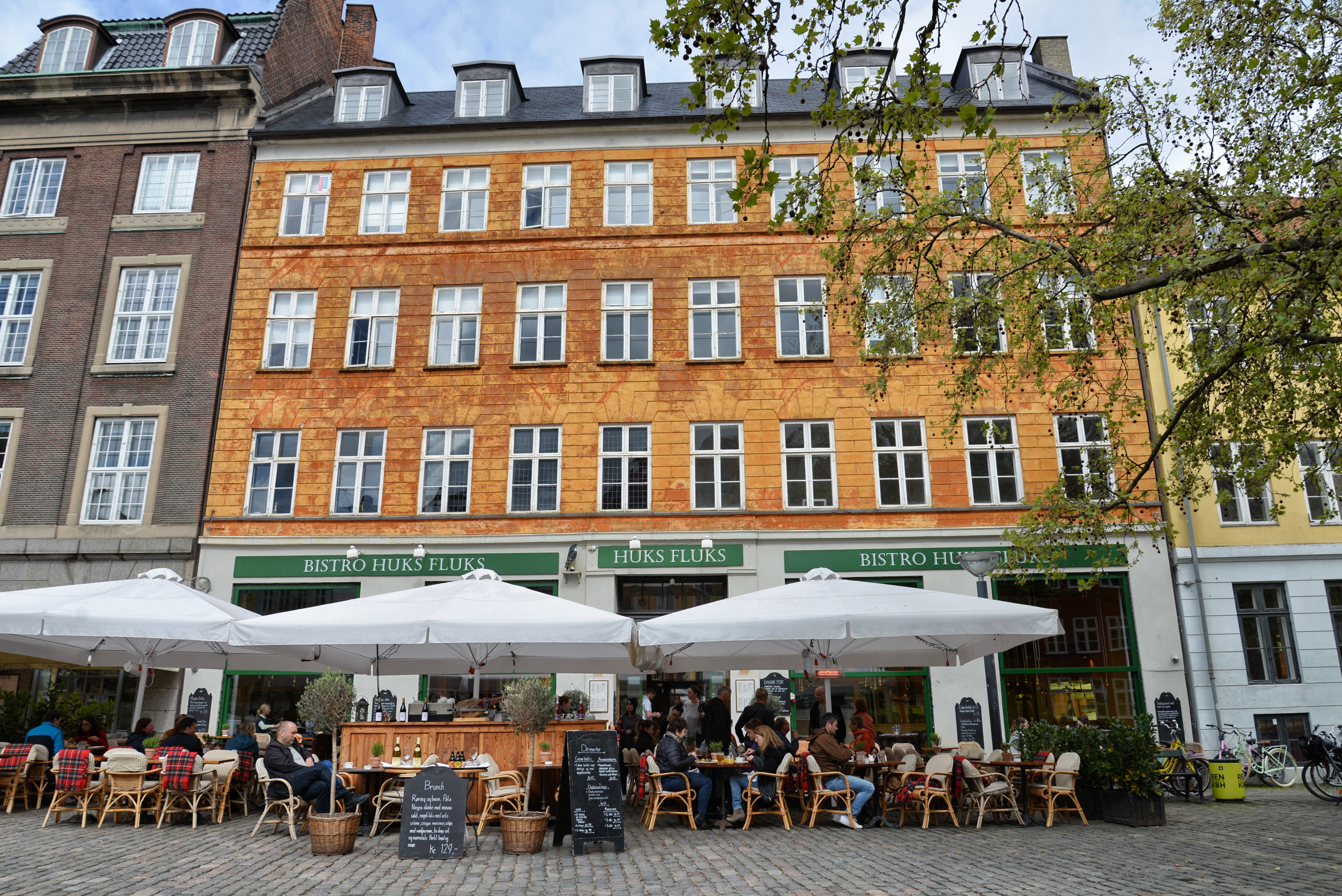
No. 8: The former St. Petri School

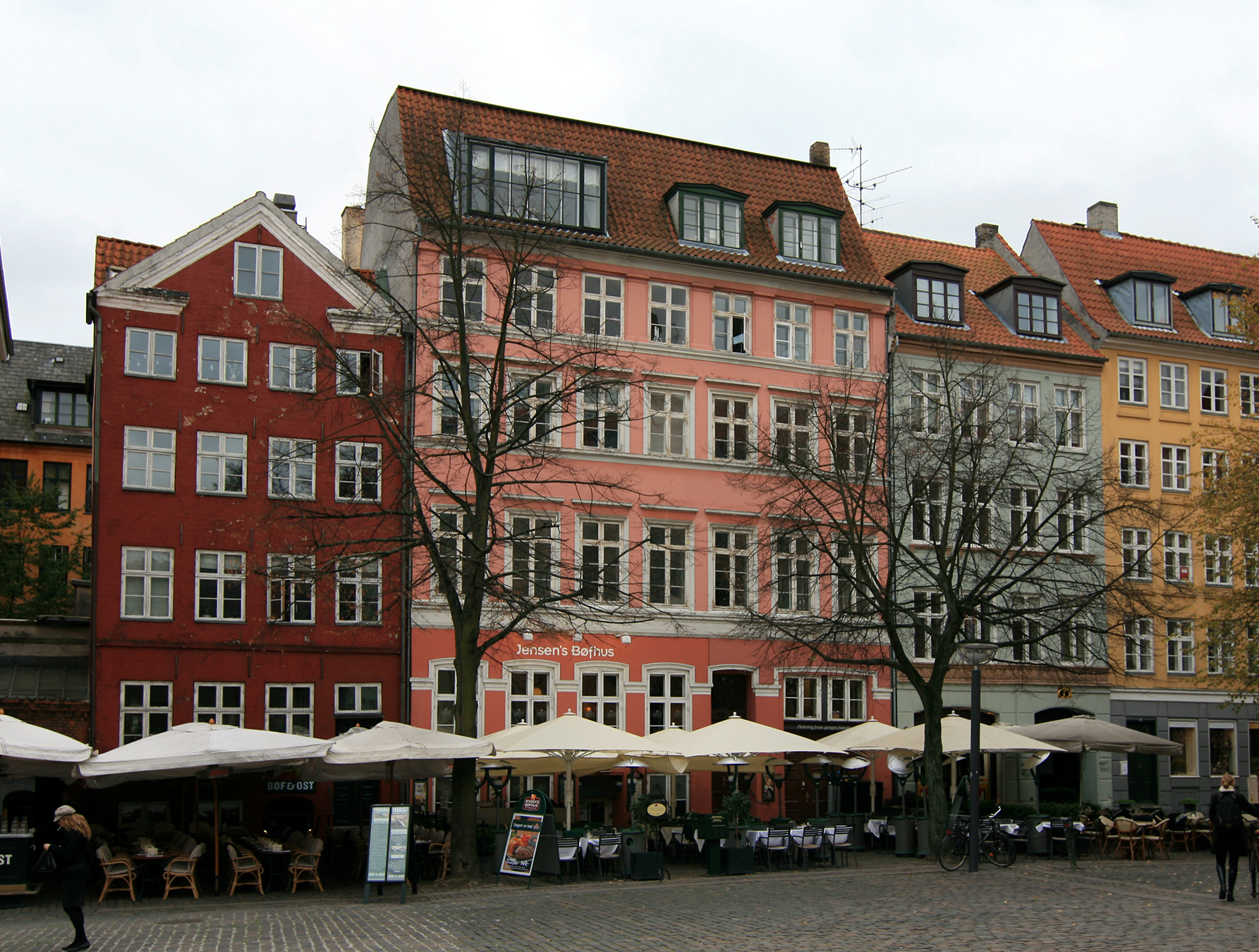
No. 13–17

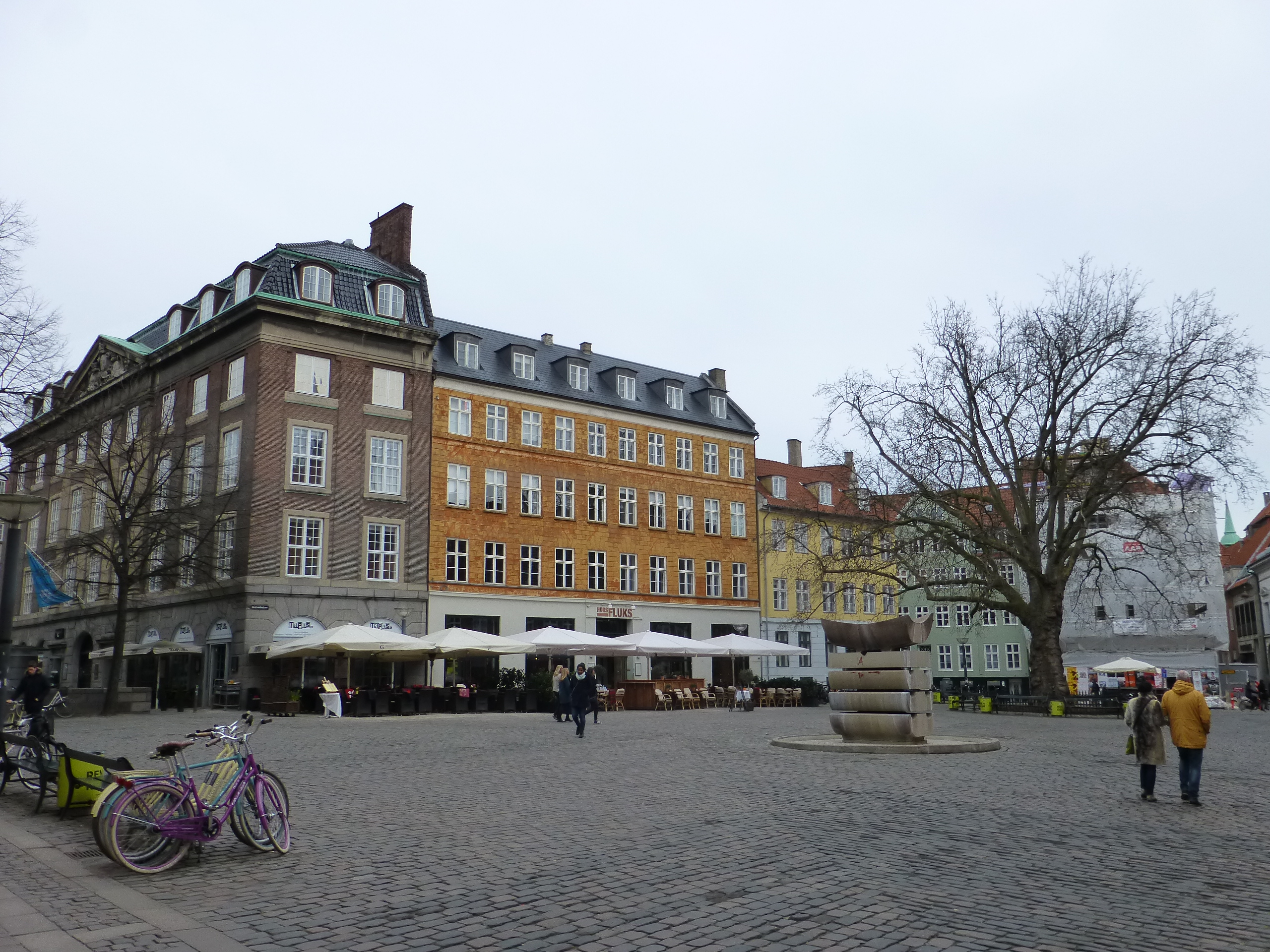
Houses

== See also ==
- Parks and open spaces in Copenhagen
- Kringlegangen
