= Larslejsstræde =

Street in Copenhagen, Denmark

Larslejsstraede
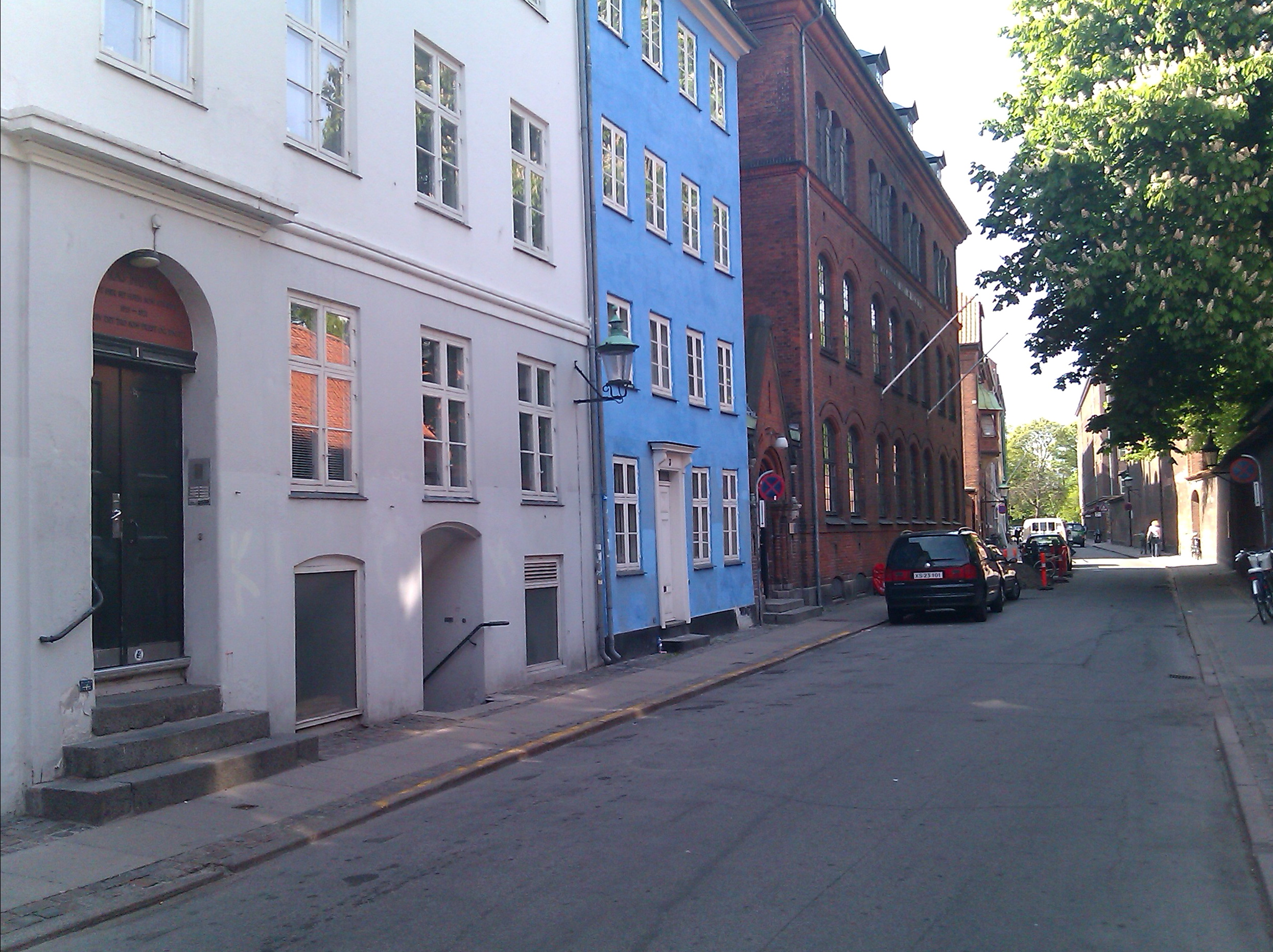
- Interactive map of Larslejsstraede
- Length: 189 m (620 ft)
- Location: Copenhagen, Denmark
- Quarter: City centre
- Nearest metro station: Nørreport
- Coordinates: 55°40′48.72″N 12°34′10.2″E
- South end: Sankt Peders Stræde
- North end: Nørre Voldgade

Larslejsstræde is a street in the Latin Quarter of central Copenhagen, Denmark. It links Sankt Peders Stræde with Nørre Voldgade.

== History ==
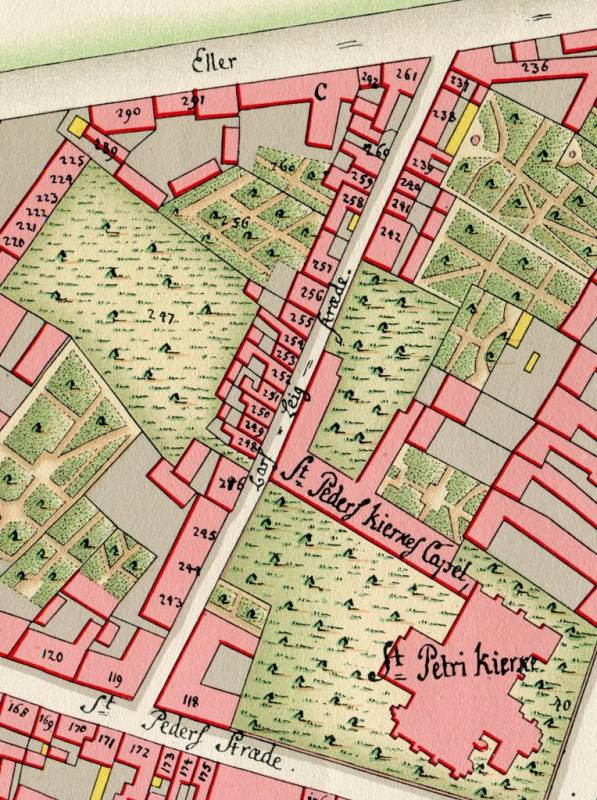
Larslejstrædeas seen on Gedde's maps of the North Quarter from 1757

The street was originally a cul-de-sac affording access to St. Peter's graveyard and a house that belonged to St. Johm's and St. Birgitte's alter. The street name is seen as Lasse Leegs stræde in 1571, referring to a man of that name who supposedly owned a house in the street for many years. Over the next period the name is variously written as Lasse-, Laurs-, Leeg-, Leyell- and Leig- before the name Larsleistræde is established. The houses along the street were destroyed both in the Copenhagen Fire of 1728 and in the Fire of 1795 but rebuilt soon thereafter.

== Notable buildings and structures ==
No. 2 is from 1829 and the former rectory for the pastor at St. Peter's Church. The rest of the northeast side of the street is dominated by the wall of St. Peter's graveyard and the large Sankt Petri Passage complex (No. 4–6) with a passageway that through several interior courtyards links Larslejstræde and Nørregade on the other side of the block.

The buildings at No. 5 and No. 7 are from 1999 and was designed by Frederik Levy. No. 7 is listed. No. 1 (1838) and No. 3 (1823) are also listed. The German Sankt Petri Schule is based in No. 5.

Det Petersenske Jomfrukloster at No. 11 is from 1937 and provides housing for unmarried, female descendants of Thomas Lindemann, pastor at St. Peter's Church from1638-54. The foundation was created by two of his grand children in the 1760s and was first located in Klostergården on Amagertorv. It later moved to Klosterstræde and from 1938 to Larslejstræde.

== See also ==
- Abraham Pelt
