= Gerhard Morell =

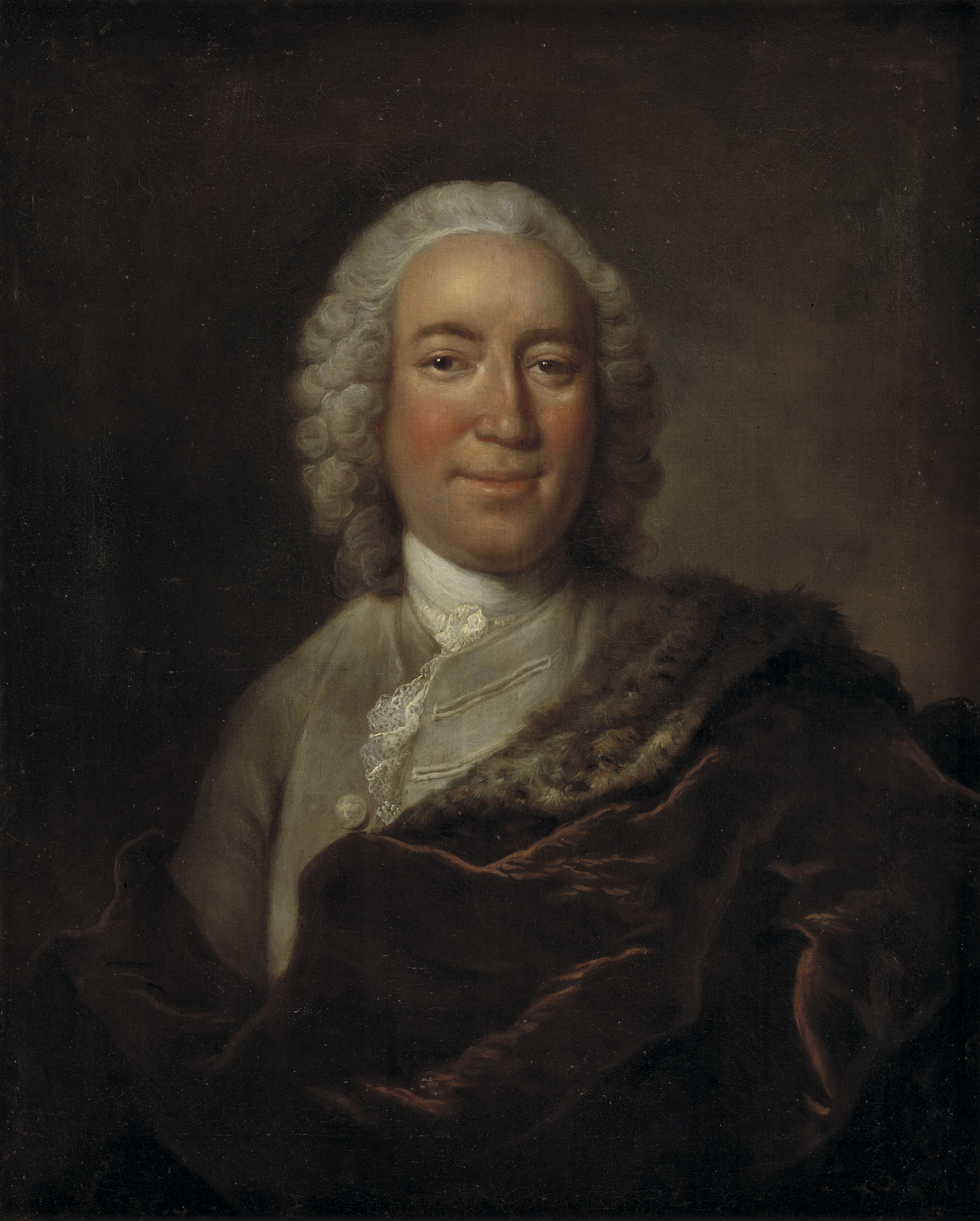
Portrait of Morell by Johann Salomon Wahl.

Gerhard Heinrich Matthias Morell (c. 1710 - 28 May 1771) was a Danish art dealer and keeper of the Kunstkammeret.

== Early life ==
Morell was born in c. 1710 to Anna Dorothea. She married secondly before 1746 Thomas Nicolaus Holschmacher. He was allegedly educated as a painter but mp wprls by him are known. He became an art dealer in an early age and was referred to as cabit inspector of queen Sophie Magdalene's brother Frederik Ernst Baireuth. He seems to have spent much of his time abroad, especially in Hamburg, where in 1746 he acquired citizenship as a vinegar manufacturer.

== Career ==
He later moved to Copenhagen and entered royal service. From 1757, he sold a considerable number of artworks to the king. Im 1759, he presented the king with a plan for the installation of an art gallery at Christiansborg Palace, partly based on works from the royal collection and partly with new acquisitions. The plan was approved and Morell was the same year sent to the Netherlands with passport as thecnophylacii directo and was promised to succeed J. S. du Wahl as keeper of Kunstkammeret. In 1763, he was again sent on a purchasing trip abroad. In 1762–64, he was engaged in the installation of the new art gallery. In 1767. he presented the king with a hand-written cataloque of the royal collection. In 1757–64, he made further acquisitions of elder artworks. In 1765, he was finally appointed as keeper of Kunstkammeret. After his death in 1771, he was succeeded by Lorenz Spengler. Morell was also responsible for expanding and cataloging for some of the other important art collections of the time, including those of Otto Thott, J. L. Holstein and the Moltke family.

== Personal life ==
On 25 January 1746 in Hamburg, Morell married Maria Elisabeth Deroden (c. 1707 - 17 August 1772)- She was the widow of Jakob Hahn). Her stepmother was Joanne Marguerite Deroden (1705–59). Morell died on 28 May 1771 and was buried at St. Peter's Church.
