= Frederik Levy =

Danish architect (1851–1924)

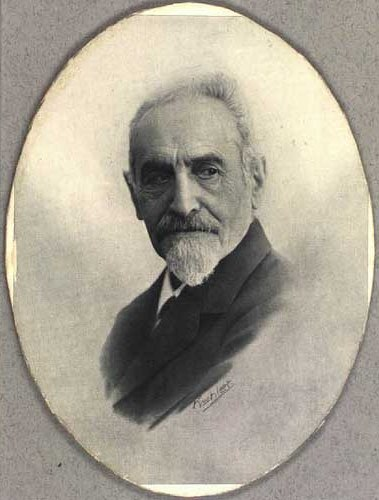
Frederik Levy

Frederik Lauritz Levy (1 February 1851 – 12 April 1924) was a Danish architect.

== Early life and education ==
Levy was born on 1 February 1851 in Hamburg as the eldest of three children of Meyer Aaron Levy (1817-1896) and Henriette (Jette) Heyman (1817-1898). His mother was the daughter of businessman Wulff Philip Heyman and thus the sister of Philip Heyman and Isaac Wulff Heyman. She had previously been married to Julius Simon Lazarus. The family would later move to Copenhagen where Lavy's father was licensed as a wholesaler (grosserer).

Frederik Levy completed his secondary schooling in 1870. He was subsequently prepared for his architecture studies by C.V. Nielsen. He graduated from the Royal Danish Academy of Fine Arts in 1878.

== Career ==
Levy established his own architectural firm. His works included a number of company headquarters, warehouses and a number of assignments for Copenhagen's Jewish congregation. His first projects were mainly inspirated by Italian Medieval and Renaissance style architecture. His later designs were inspired by Baroque architecture.

== Personal life ==
Levy married on 6 August 1880 to Christiane Ottilie Christensen (1855-1897), daughter of businessman Christian Christensen and Hansine Hendrine Bertelsen.

== List of works ==
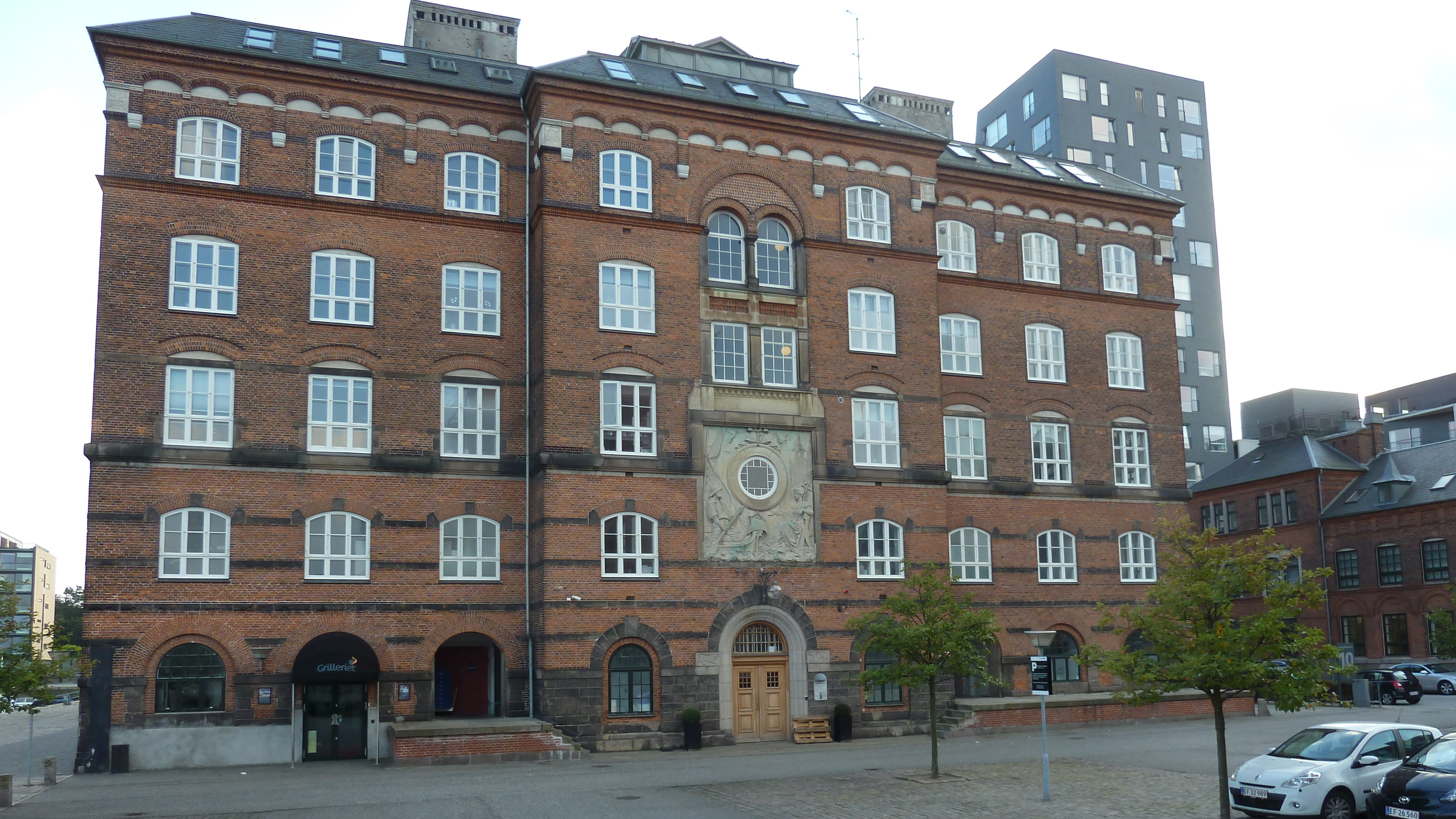
Manufakturhuset, Copenhagen (1895).

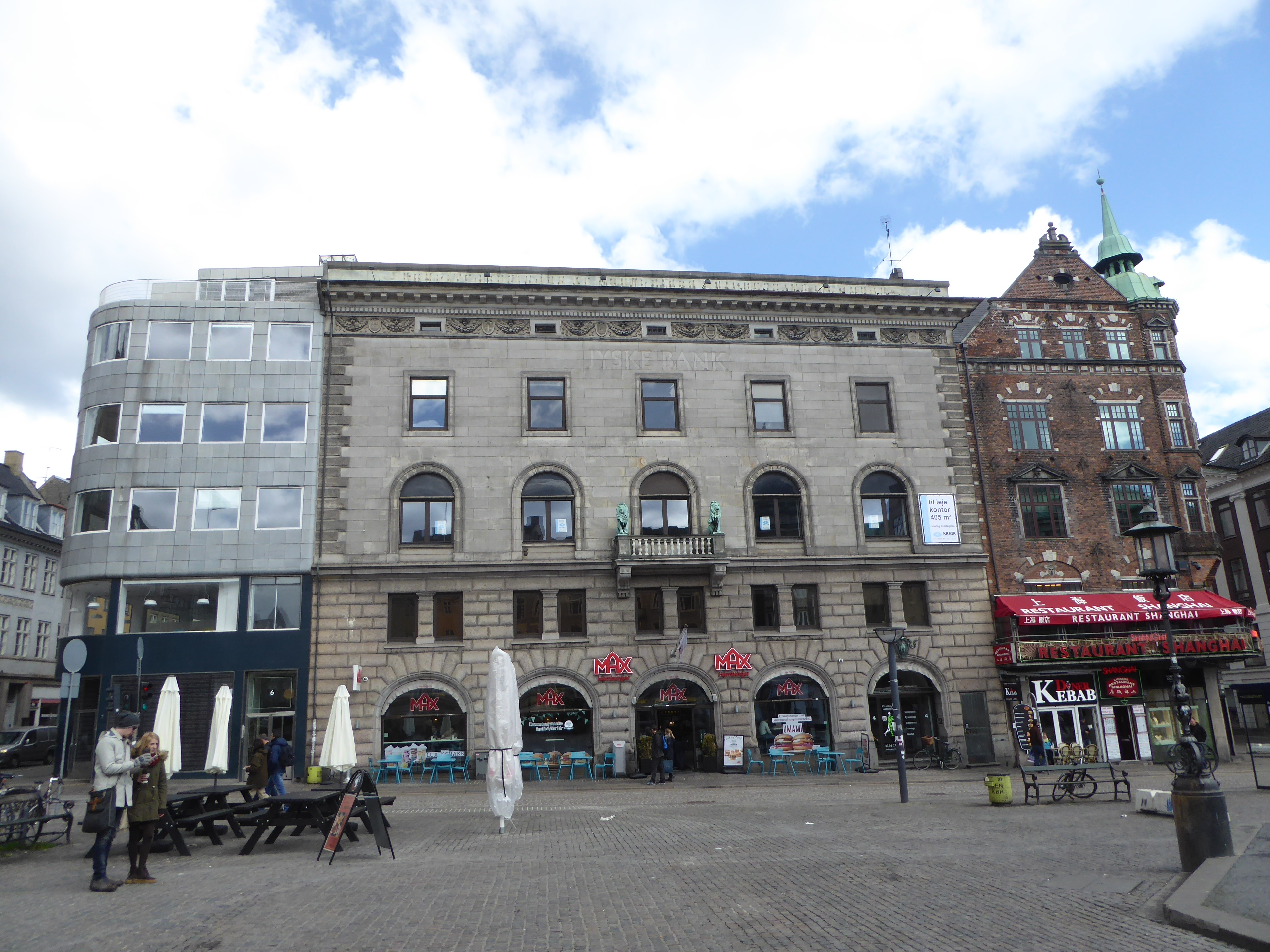
- Gammeltorv 4, Copenhagen (1898–99).

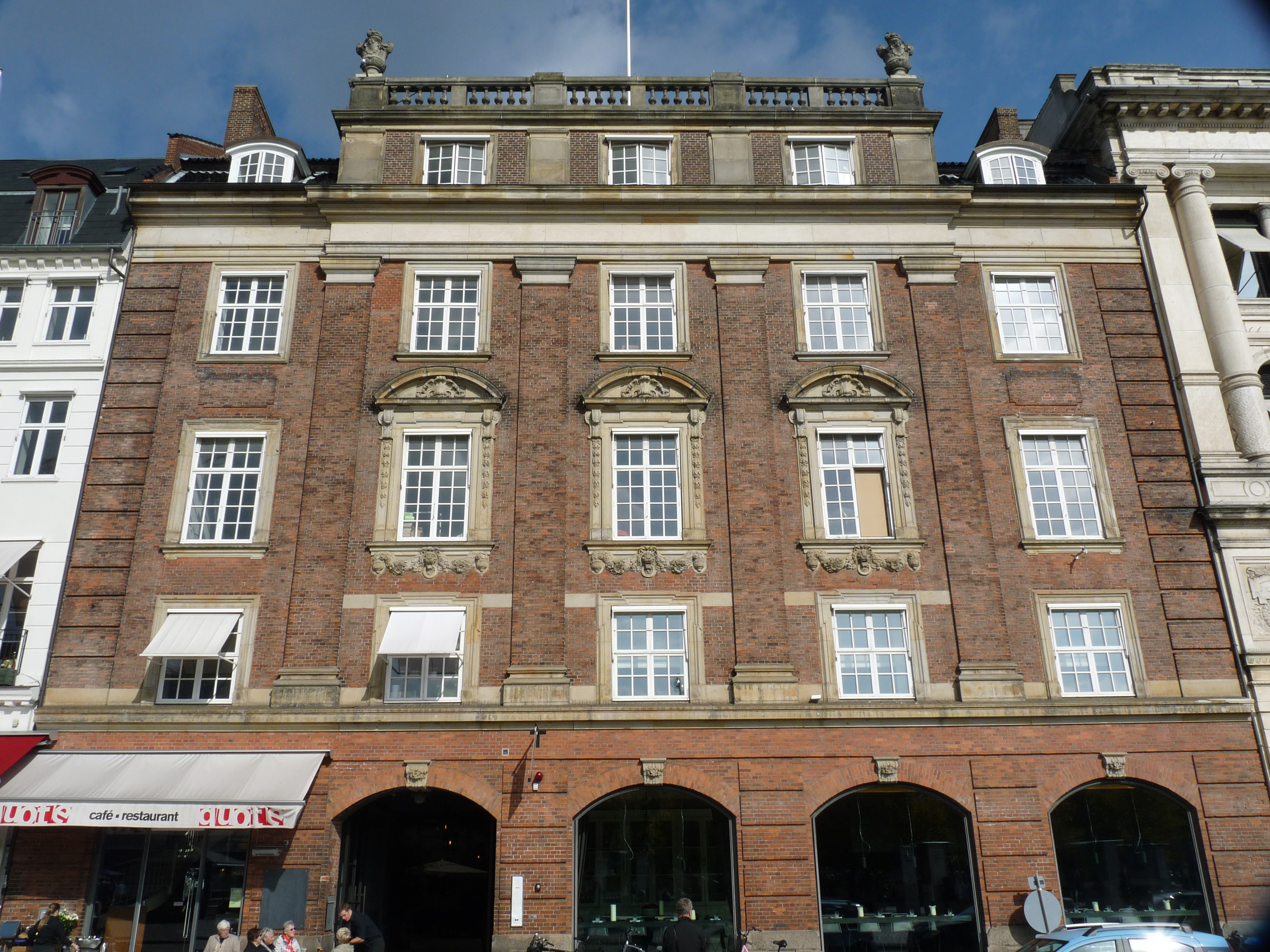
Kongens Nyorv 8, Copenhagen (1904–05)

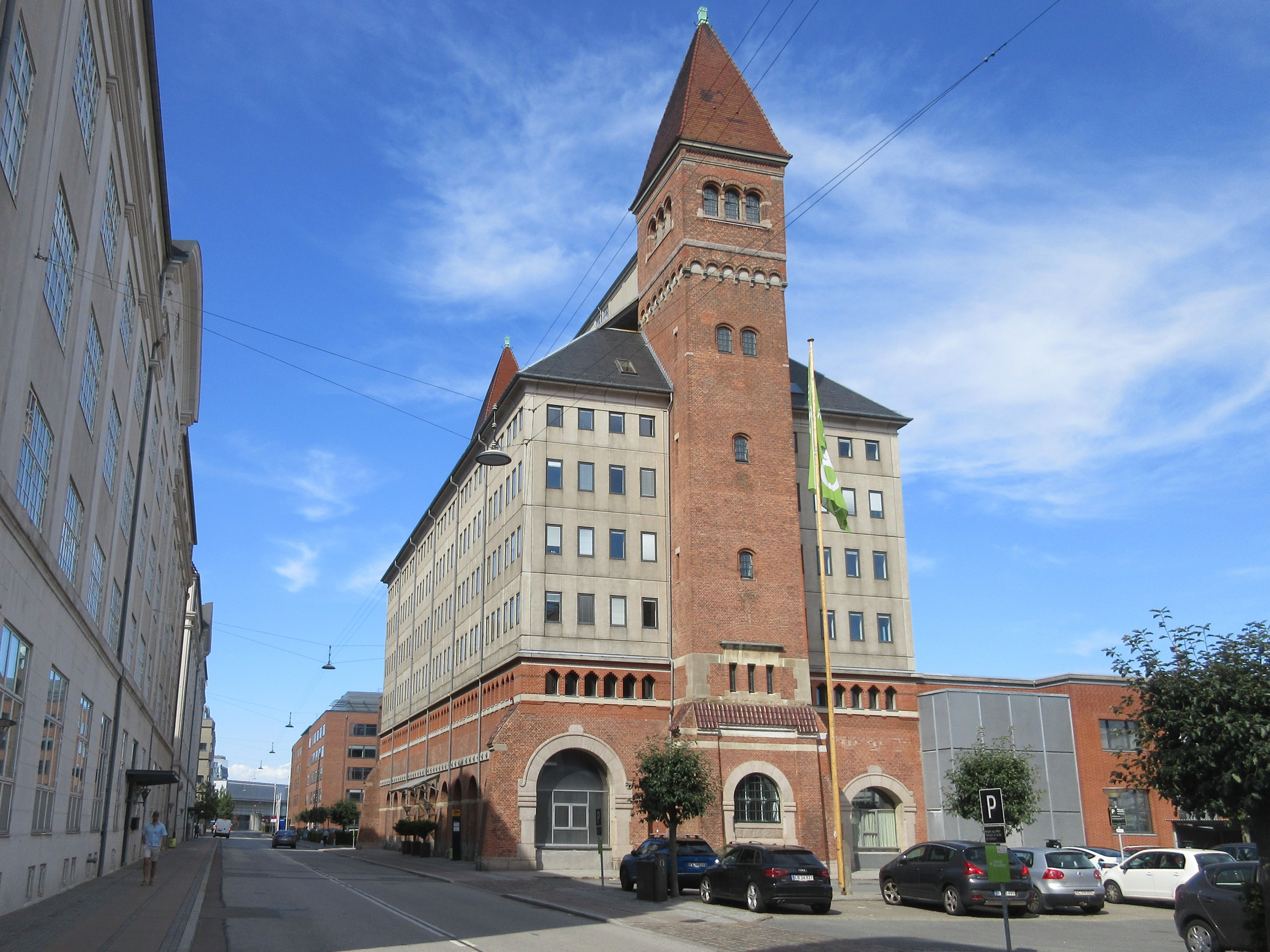
Tegionernes Hus, Copenhagen (1903).

- Hospital, Sjællandsgade, Fredericia (1880–81)
- Døvstummeinstitut, Fredericia (1880–81)
- Fyns Svineslagteri, Assens (1883–84)
- Extension of Copenhagen Synagogue, Krystalgade 12, Copenhagen (1885, with Ove Petersen)
- Inspector's House, Jewish Northern Cemetery, Møllegade, Copenhagen 1885)
- Hotel Øresund, Skodsborg Strandvej 154–156, Skodsborg (1885)
- Extension of Skodsborg Badehotel, nu ejerlejligheder, Skodsborg Strandvej 225-227 (1886–87)
- Ligkapel, Mosaisk Kirkegård (1886–88)
- Holbæk County Psyciantric Hospital, Holbæk (1888–89)
- Refurbishment of the Erichsen Mansion, Holmens Kanal 2 for Kjøbenhavns Handelsbank (1888–92)
- Slomanns Skole, Jakob Dannefærds Vej 3, Frederiksberg (1889, now Teknisk Skole)
- Østerbros Latin- og Realskole, Odensegade 14, Copenhagen (1889, nu Kriminalforsorgens Uddannelsescenter)
- Døvstummeskole, Nyborg (1890–91)
- Epidemihus, Kalundborg (1891)
- Frederiksberg Gymnasium (1891)
- Hospital, Sæby, Nordvestsjælland (1893)
- Vestre Borgerdydskole, Helgolandsgade 6, Copenhagen (1893, nowVUC København)
- Forretningsejendom, Frederiksborggade 14/Nørrevoldgade 88-88A, Copenhagen (1898)
- Kreditforeningen for København og Omegn, Gammeltorv 4 (1898–99, now Jyske Bank)
- Pelts Stiftelse, Larslejsstræde 5–7, Copenhagen (1899)
- Pakhus A, kaldet "Domkirken", Dampfærgevej, Københavns Frihavn (1899, demolished 1965)
- Manufakturhuset, Dampfærgevej, Copenhagen Frihavn (1899)
- Villa Bondicar for Johan Hansen, Skodsborg Strandvej 268, Skodsborg (1899)
- Ejendom, Vesterbrogade 80-82/Værnedamsvej 2, København (1900–01)
- Bredgade 31, Copenhagen (1902)
- Det mosaiske Samfunds Stiftelse, Ny Kongensgade 8–12, Copenhagen (1902–03, ombygget 1985–86)
- Bernhard Ruben og Hustrus Stiftelse, Falkoner Allé 72, Frederiksberg (1903–04, præmieret)
- Silopakhus B, Copenhagen Frihavn (1903, listed, adapted1995-96)
- Udvidelse af Østre Borgerdydskole, Stockholmsgade 59, Copenhagen (1904)
- Forretningsejendom, Kongens Nytorv 8/Store Kongensgade 14, Copenhagen (1904–05)
- Kjøbenhavns Handelsbank, Holmens Kanal 4 (1908–10, later altered)
- Siemens-Schuckerts Building, Blegdamsvej 124/Ryesgade 113, Copenhagen (1912–13)
- Adaption of the Prince Wilhelm Mansion, Sankt Annæ Plads 13 for Det Danske Petroleums Aktieselskab (1922–23, sammen med Niels Hauberg)
