= Abraham Pelt =

Danish industrialist and philanthropist

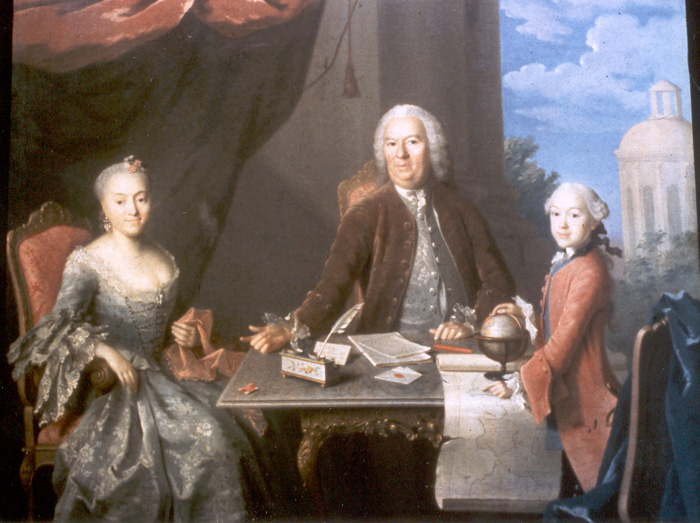
- Pelt with his wife and son painted by Johan Hörner in the 1750s
- Born: 11 February 1695; Copenhagen, Kingdom of Denmark
- Died: 14 April 1783 (aged 88); Copenhagen, Kingdom of Denmark
- Occupation: Sugar manufacturer

Abraham Pelt (11 February 1695 – 14 April 1783) was a Danish industrialist and philanthropist.

== Early life ==
Pelt was born in Copenhagen, the son of Hans Peter Pelt (died 1715) and Dorothea Kellinghusen (died 1732). In 1708, his father, who was originally from the Netherlands, obtained a license to establish Copenhagen's second sugar refinery. The sugar refineries were generally some of the most profitable industrial enterprises in the country at the time.

== Career ==
Pelt inherited a thriving sugar refinery business. It was originally located in Christianshavn but relocated to No. 5 in the city's North Quarter (now Gammeltorv 14-16 and Nørregade 7) after the Copenhagen Fire of 1728. Pelt was active in the Danish Asiatic Company and served as a bank commissioner at Kurantbanken in 1759-74.

== Personal life ==
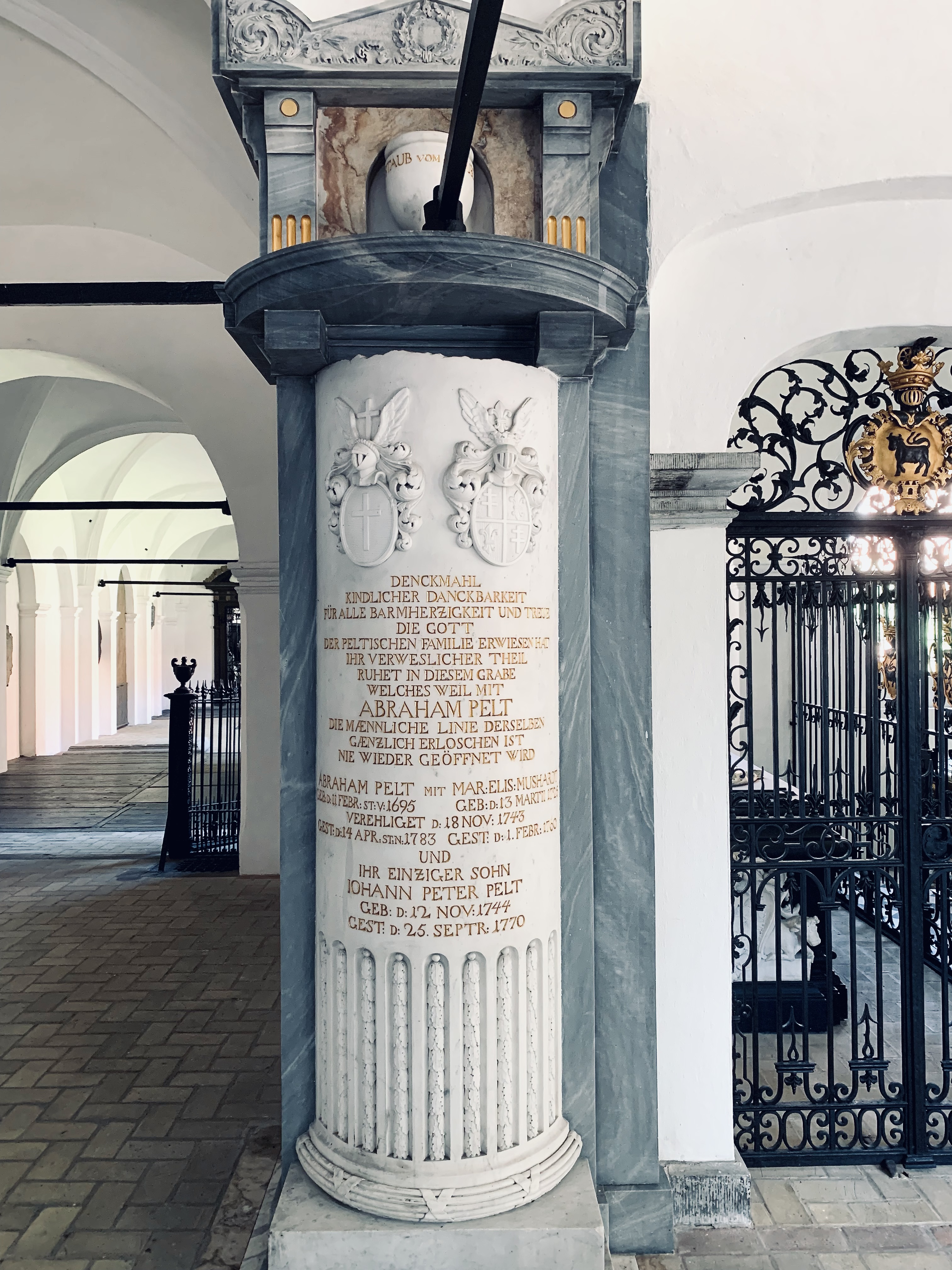
Pelt's chapel in St. Peter's Church.

Pelt married on 18 November 1743 in the Church of Our Saviour Maria Elisabeth Mushardt (13 3 May 1725 in Kristiania – 1 2 February 1760 in Copenhagen), daughter of later Major-General Christian Eberhardt Mushardt (died 1732). They had one child, a son, Peter Pelt, who died in 1770. Abraham Pelt died in 1783. He is buried in St. Peter's Church. The sugar refinery, which had by then moved to a site next to the Exchange Dock, was taken over by Pelt's associated Hinrich Ladiges (1731-1805). He was also the owner of a sugar refinery in Naboløs.

== Pelts Stiftelse ==
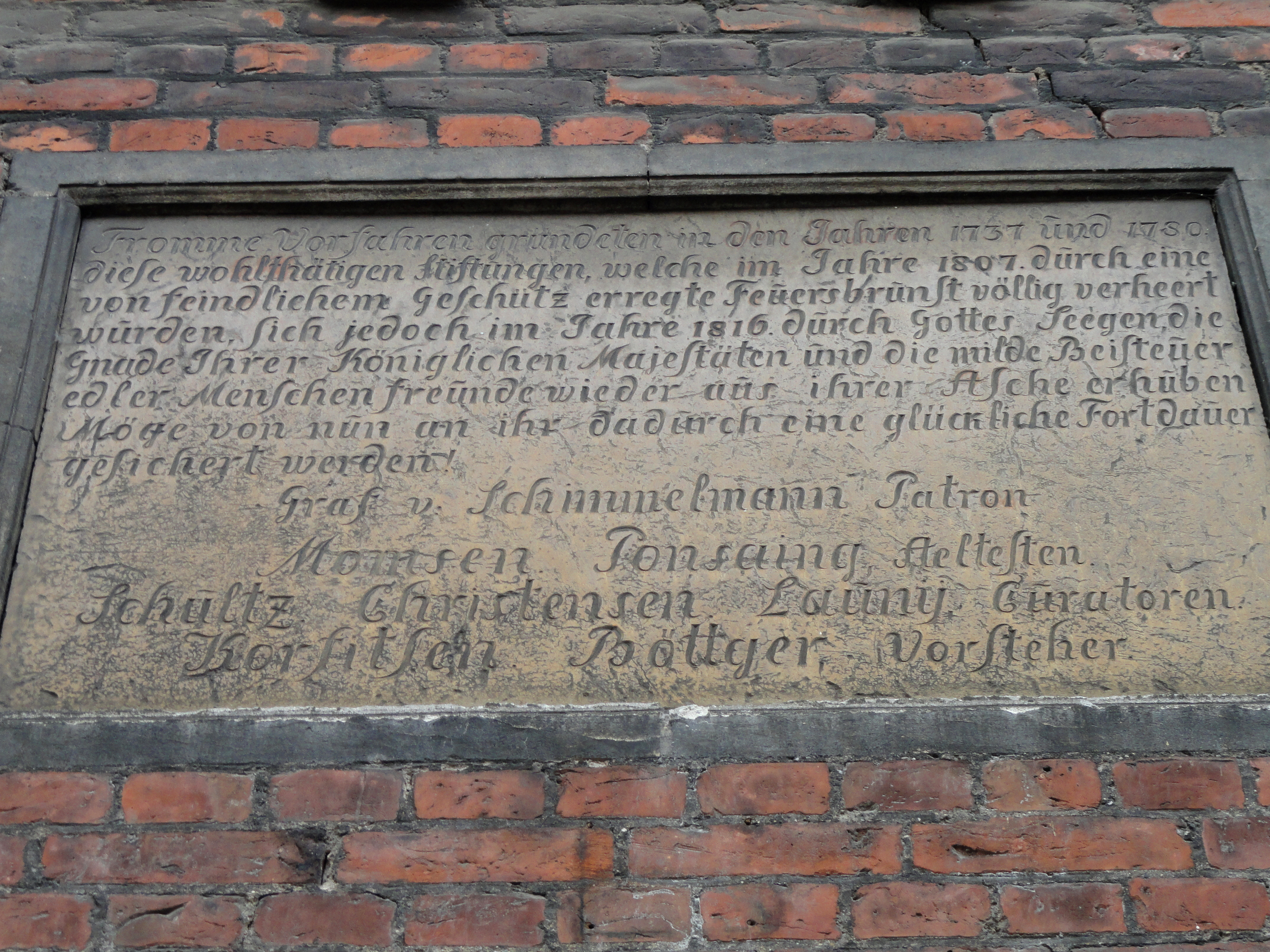
Commemorative plaque

In 1779, having no longer any living heirs, Pelt established a home for 16 elderly men and women, Pelts Plejestiftelse (or Den Peltske Stiftelse), which was located in Larslejsstræde, adjacent to two similar institutions. One had been operated by St. Peter's Church while the other, Thymes Stiftelse, had been established by Winand Thyme in 1775. They were later merged under the name Skt. Petri kirkes, Thymes og Pelts plejestiftelse. It was destroyed in the British bombardment of Copenhagen in 1807 but a new and larger building was completed after the war.

A new building (Larslejsstræde 7) was built in 1899 to design by the architect Frederik Levy. It was built as part of a larger complex which also comprised new premises for the German congregation's Sankt Petri Schule. The new building contained 38 one-room apartments as well as various residences for people associated with the school, congregation or church. Most of the residents were German expatriate women. In 1997, the building was sold to the school which needed more space for its increasing number of students.
