= Latin Quarter, Copenhagen =

Coordinates: 55.6794°N 12.5725°E

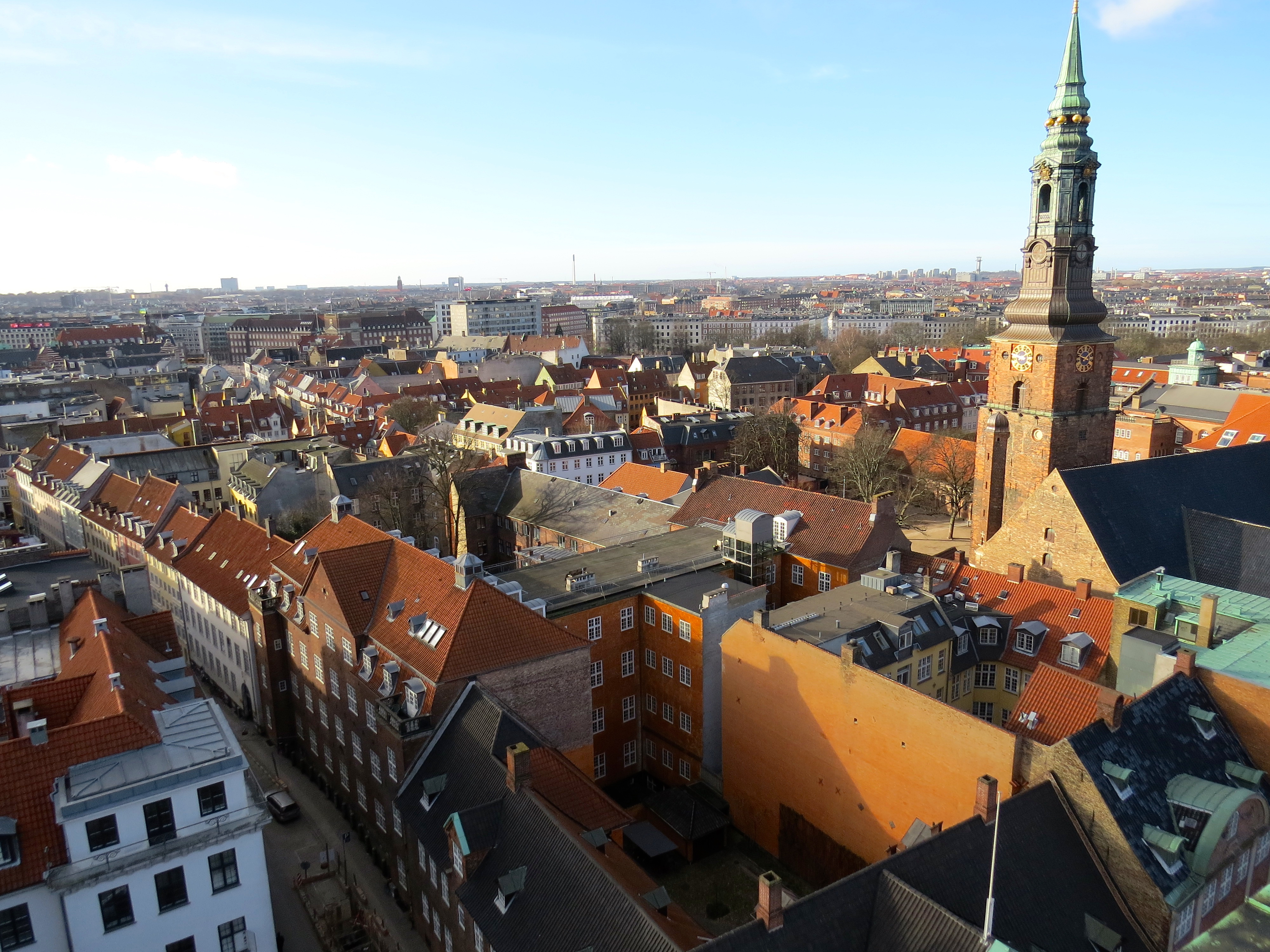
View of the Latin Quarter

The Latin Quarter (Danish: Latinerkvarteret) is a neighbourhood in central Copenhagen, Denmark. It is bounded by Nørregade to the east, Vestergade to the south, Vester Voldgade to the west and Nørre Voldgade to the north. The name refers to the Latin language, which was once widely spoken in and around the University, whose historic home is situated on the other side of Nørregade. Most of the student life has now been relocated to four new campuses but the area is still known for its lively atmosphere with an abundance of boutiques, cafés and night clubs.

== History ==
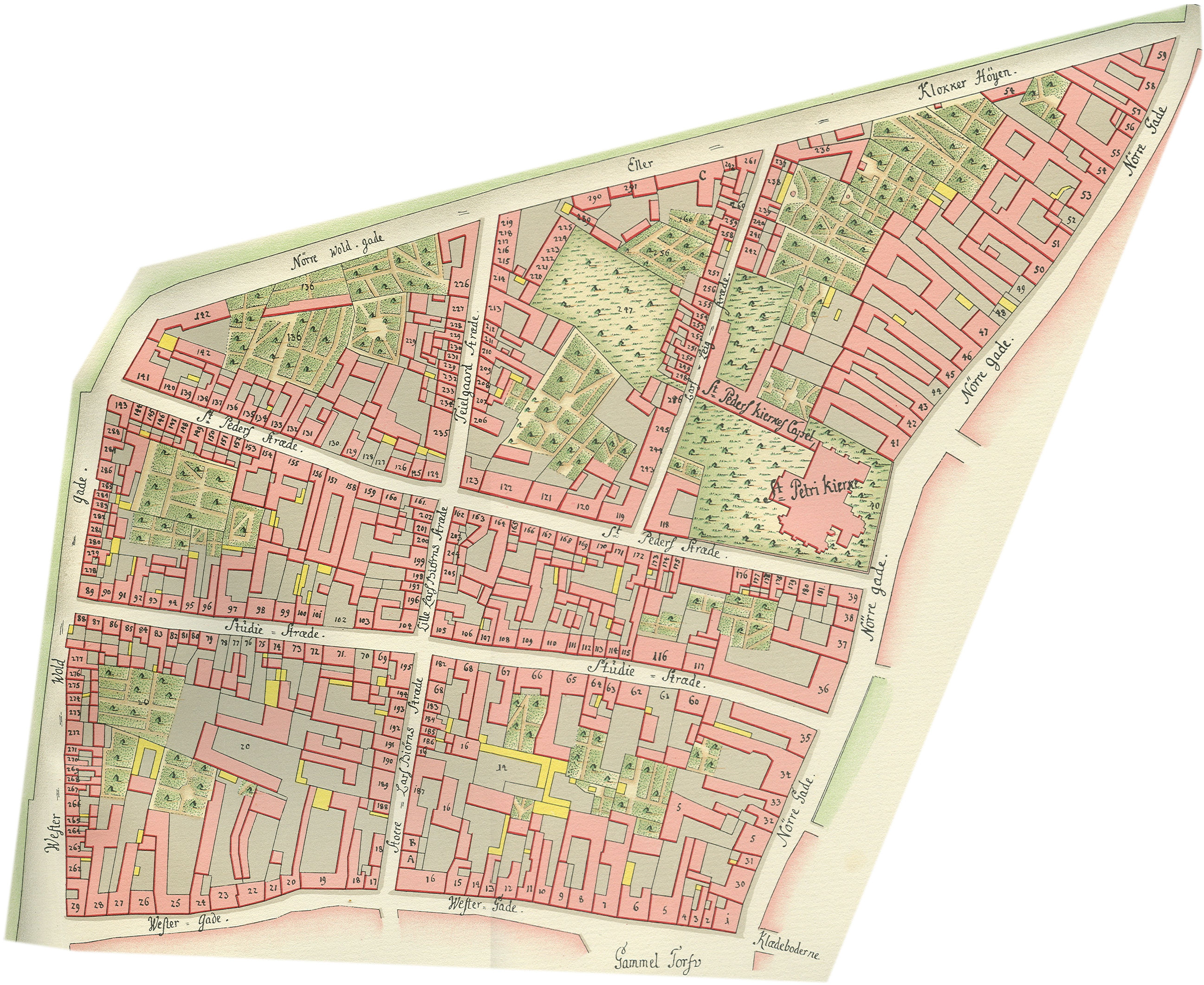
Gedde's district map of the North Quarterm 1757

The area around Our Lady's Square has been a centre for learning and thus use of the Latin language since the Middle Ages. The term Latinerkvarteret was formerly used for a larger area on both sides of the square, including Store Kannikestræde, Krystalgade and Fiolstræde.

In 1208, Bishop Peder Sunesøn founded a Latin school and a body of noble canons in association with the Church of Our Lady. When the University of Copenhagen was founded in 1479, it took over the old town hall and after the Reformation it took over the bishops palace on the north side of Our Lady's Square. The university took over the responsibility for the education of priests while the Our Lady's School survived as Copenhagen's only Latin school. In 1817 it was renamed the Metropolitan School. With the Reformation, Danish replaced Latin as the church's language but Latin remained the dominant language at the University until about 1800.

== Streets ==
- Sankt Peders Stræde
- Studiestræde
- Teglgårdsstræde
- Larsbjørnsstræde
- Larslejsstræde
- Frue Plads
- Vestergade

== Buildings ==
The Studiegården Complex consists of Studiegården from 1916, two residences for professors (Studiestræde 6 and Sankt Peder Stræde 5) and the University Annex from 1861.

Founded in 1588, Valkendorfs Kollegium (Sankt Pederstræde 19) is Denmark's oldest hall of residence. The current building is from 1866 and was designed by Christian Frederik Hansen.

== Gallery ==
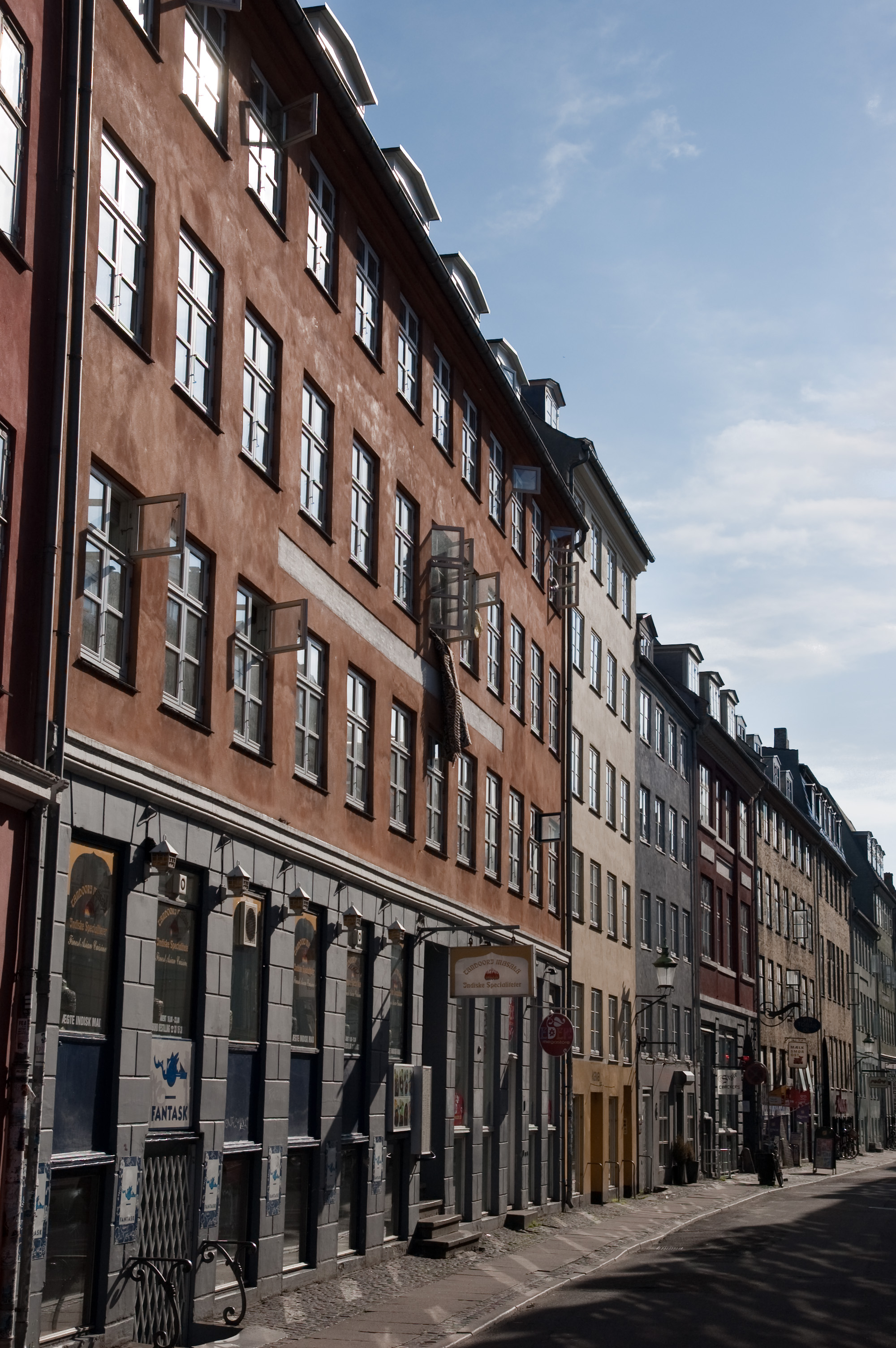
Sankt Pederstræde.

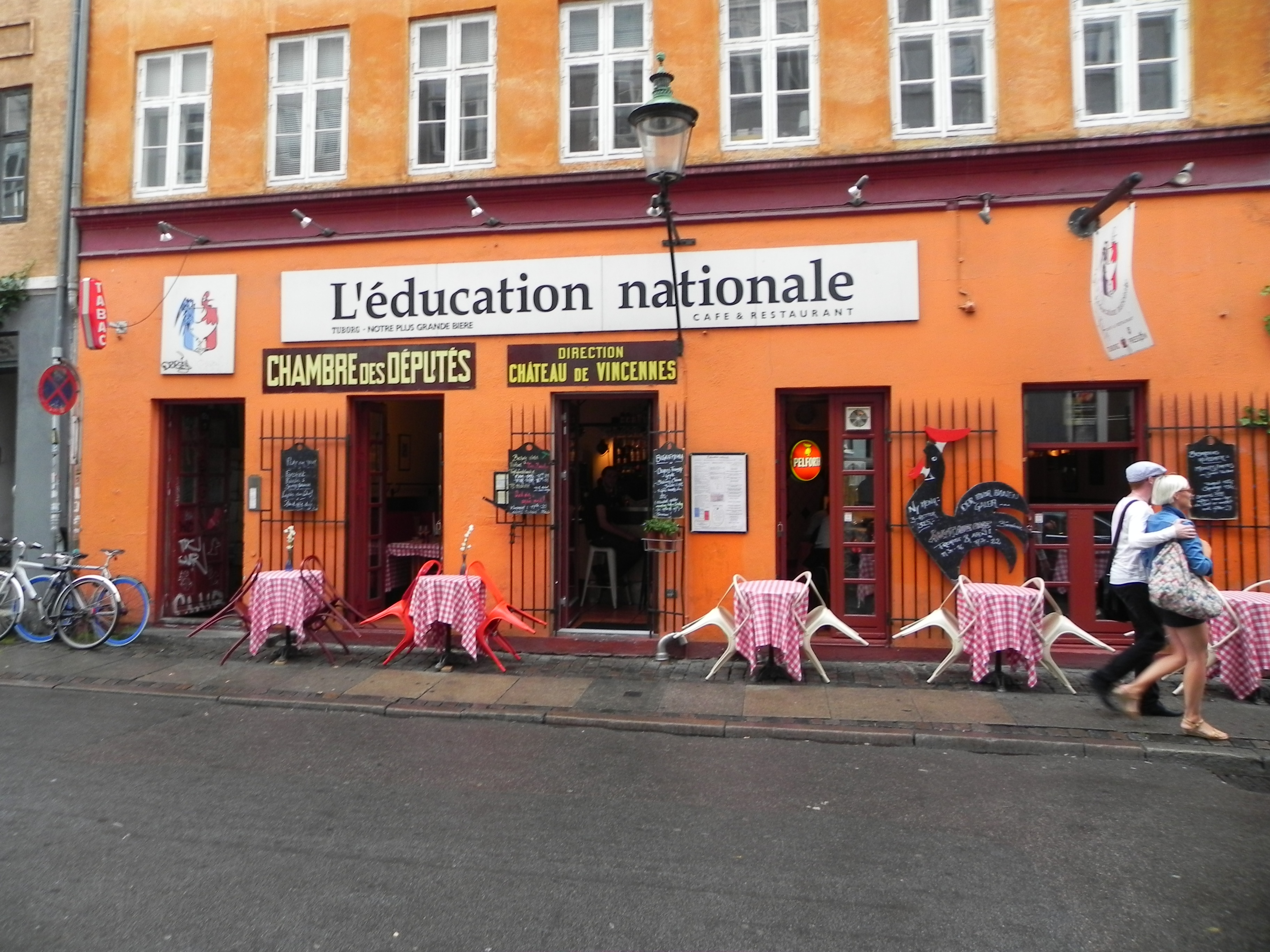
L'education nationale, a French bistro in Lars Bjørnstræde.

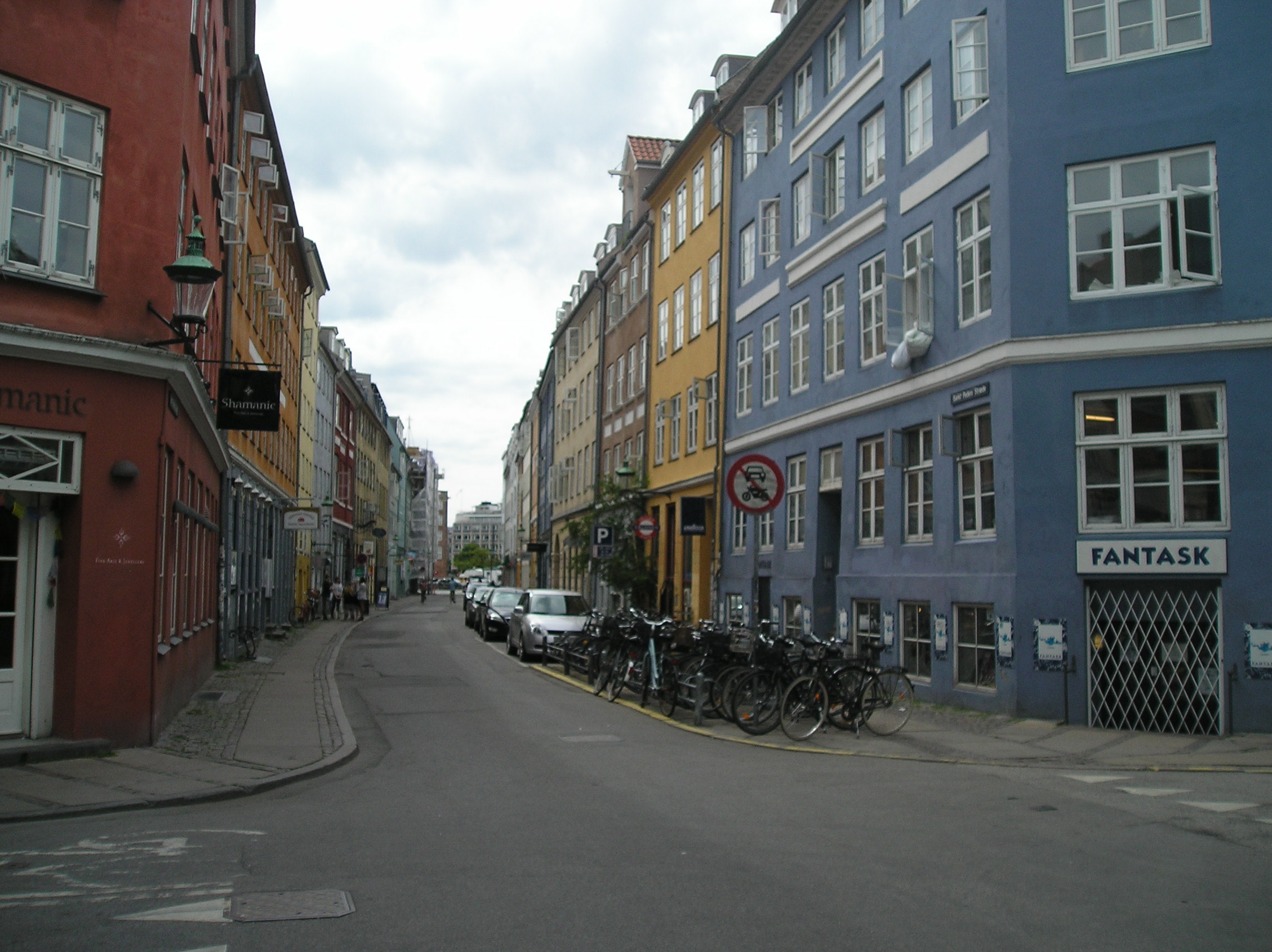
Sankt Pederstræde.

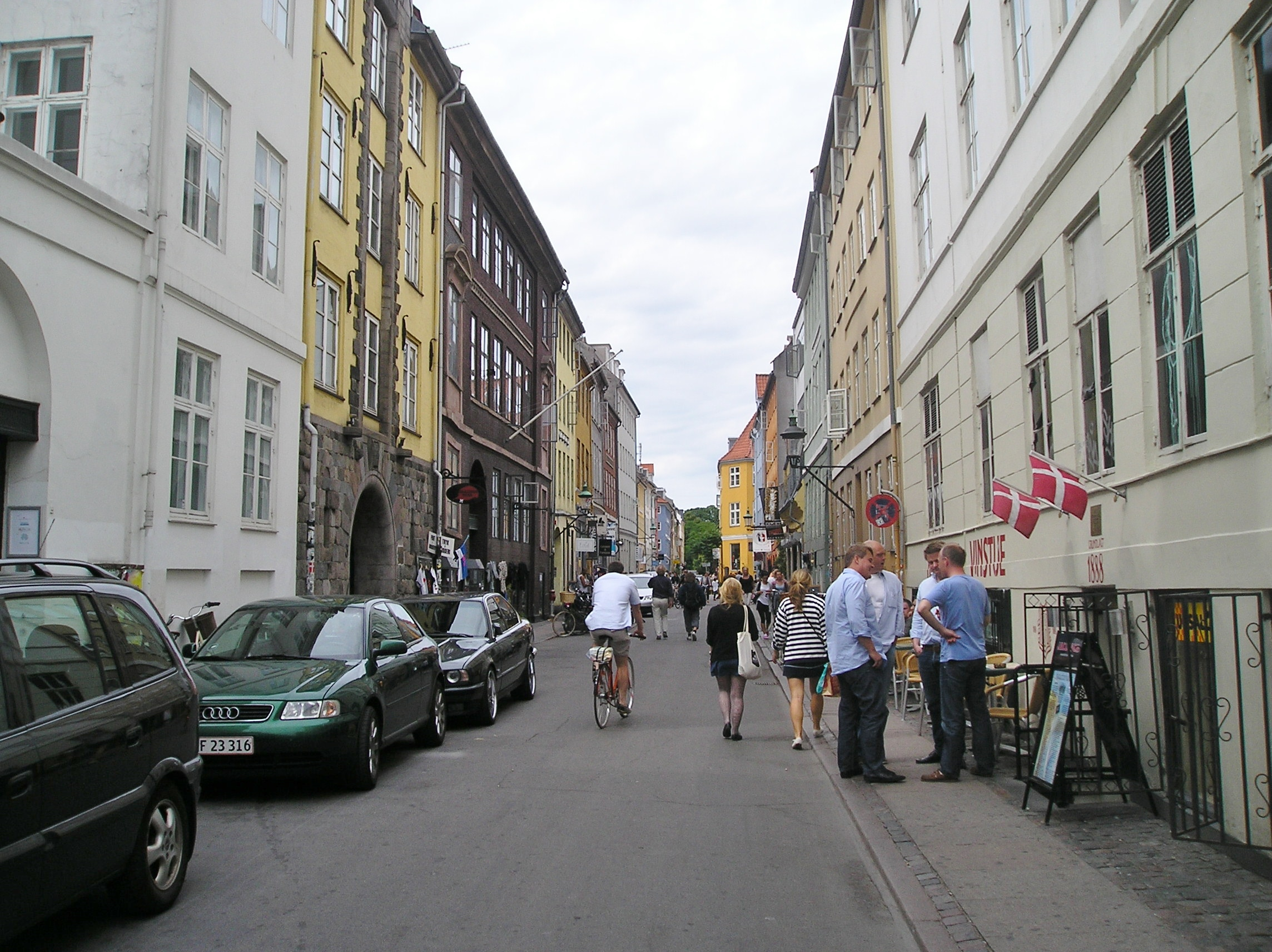
Lars Bjørnstræde.

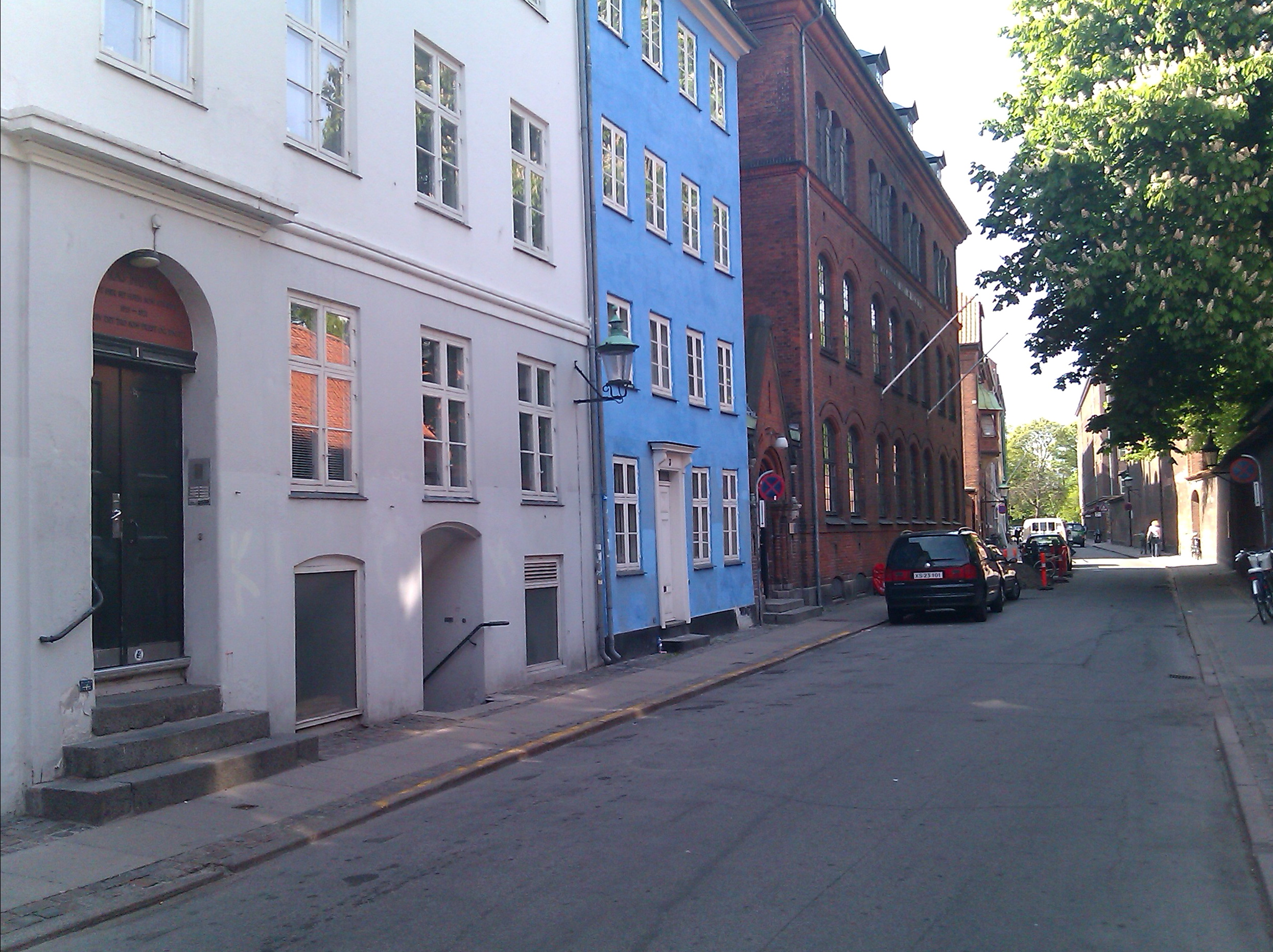
Larslejsstræde.

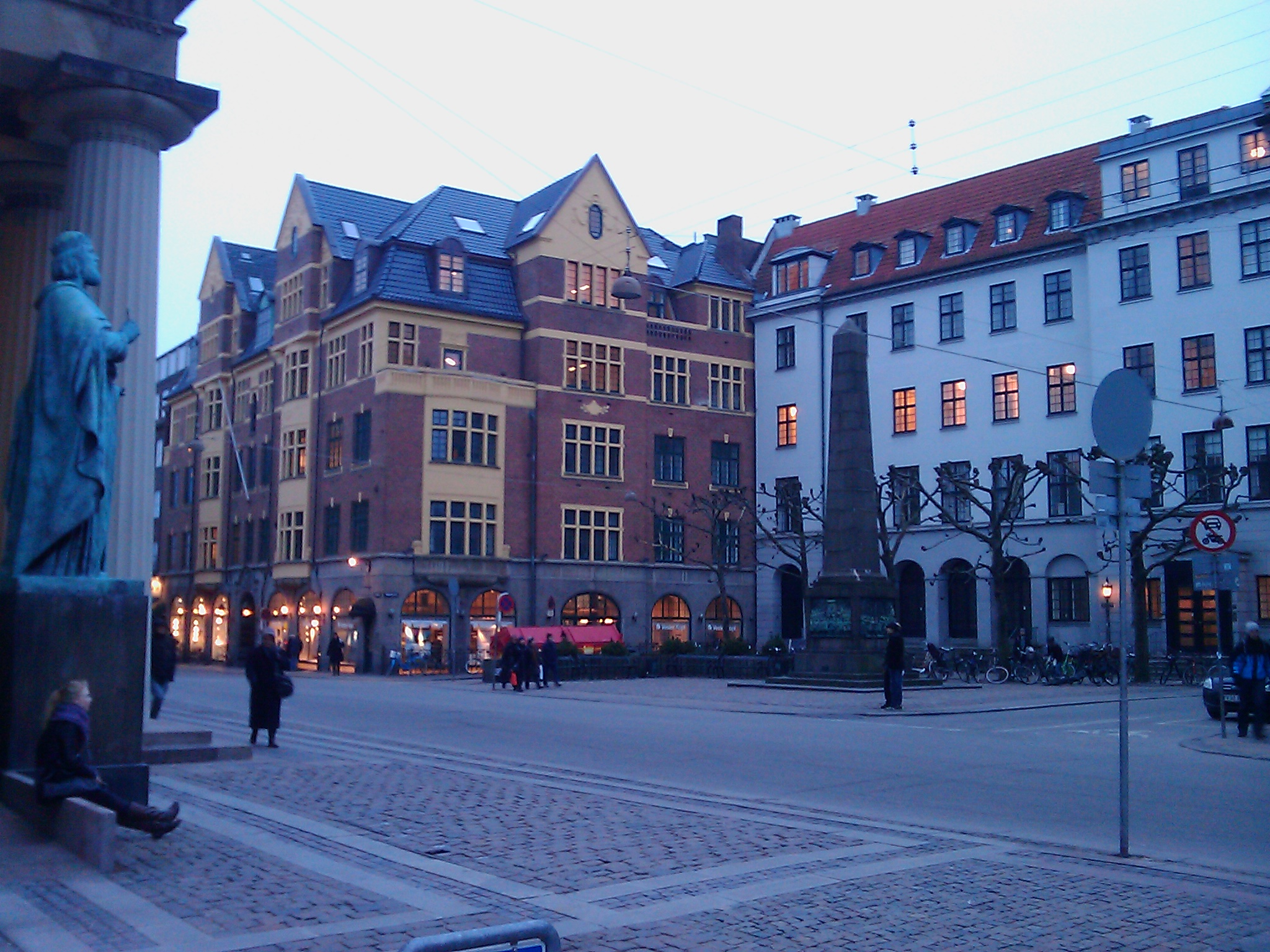
Bispetorv, on the corner of Nørregade and Studiestræde.

== Literature ==
- Linde, Peter: Latinerkvarteret. Erik Myrdahls Bogtrykkeri. 1949.
