= St. Peter's Church, Copenhagen =

Coordinates: 55°40′48″N 12°34′14″E

St. Peter's Church
- St Petri Kirke
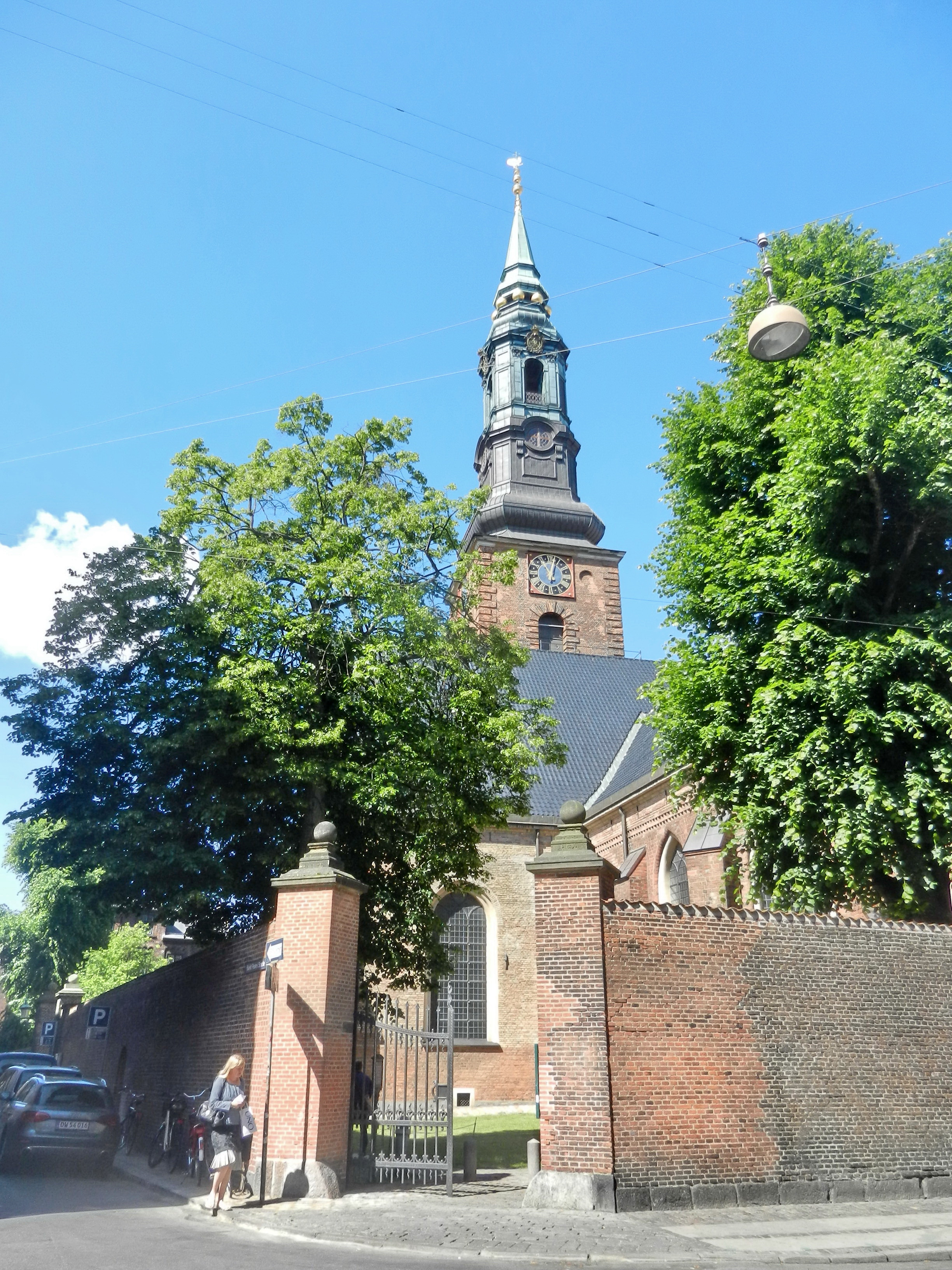
- St. Peter's Church
- Location: Larslejsstræde 11; Copenhagen
- Country: Denmark
- Denomination: Church of Denmark
- Previous denomination: Roman Catholic
- Website: www.sankt-petri.dk

History
- Status: Parish church

Architecture
- Style: Gothic with Baroque features Rococo (spires)
- Completed: Church: 15th century Spire: 1757

St. Peter's Church (Danish: Skt. Petri Kirke, German: St.-Petri-Kirche) is the parish church of the German-speaking Evangelical-Lutheran community in Copenhagen, Denmark. It is situated at the corner of Nørregade and Sankt Peders Stræde in the city's Latin Quarter. Built as a single-nave church in the mid-15th century, it is the oldest operative church in central Copenhagen. It is also notable for its extensive complex of sepulchral chapels.

== History ==
=== Medieval parish church ===
St. Peter's Church was in the Middle Ages one out of four Catholic parish churches in Copenhagen. It is first mentioned in 1304 but was most likely founded in the 12th century. The first church burnt down in 1380 but was rebuilt shortly thereafter.

=== After the Reformation ===
After the Reformation the church building was for a while used as a canon and bell foundry.

=== German church ===
In 1585, Frederick II presented St. Peter's Church to his German-speaking subjects. The building was renovated by Hans van Steenwinckel the Elder who also added a gablet upper floor to the uncompleted tower, which was however replaced by a spire in the 17th century. The church became a centre for Copenhagen's political, economic, cultural and military elite, which, like the Royal Court, relied on German for everyday use.

The rapidly growing congregation made it necessary to expand the church in several stages. Christian IV added a northern transept in 1631 and a southern transept in 1634. Just 60 years later, Christian V extended the north transept again. The distinctive sepulchral chapels arose between 1648 and 1740.

=== After the Fire of 1728 ===
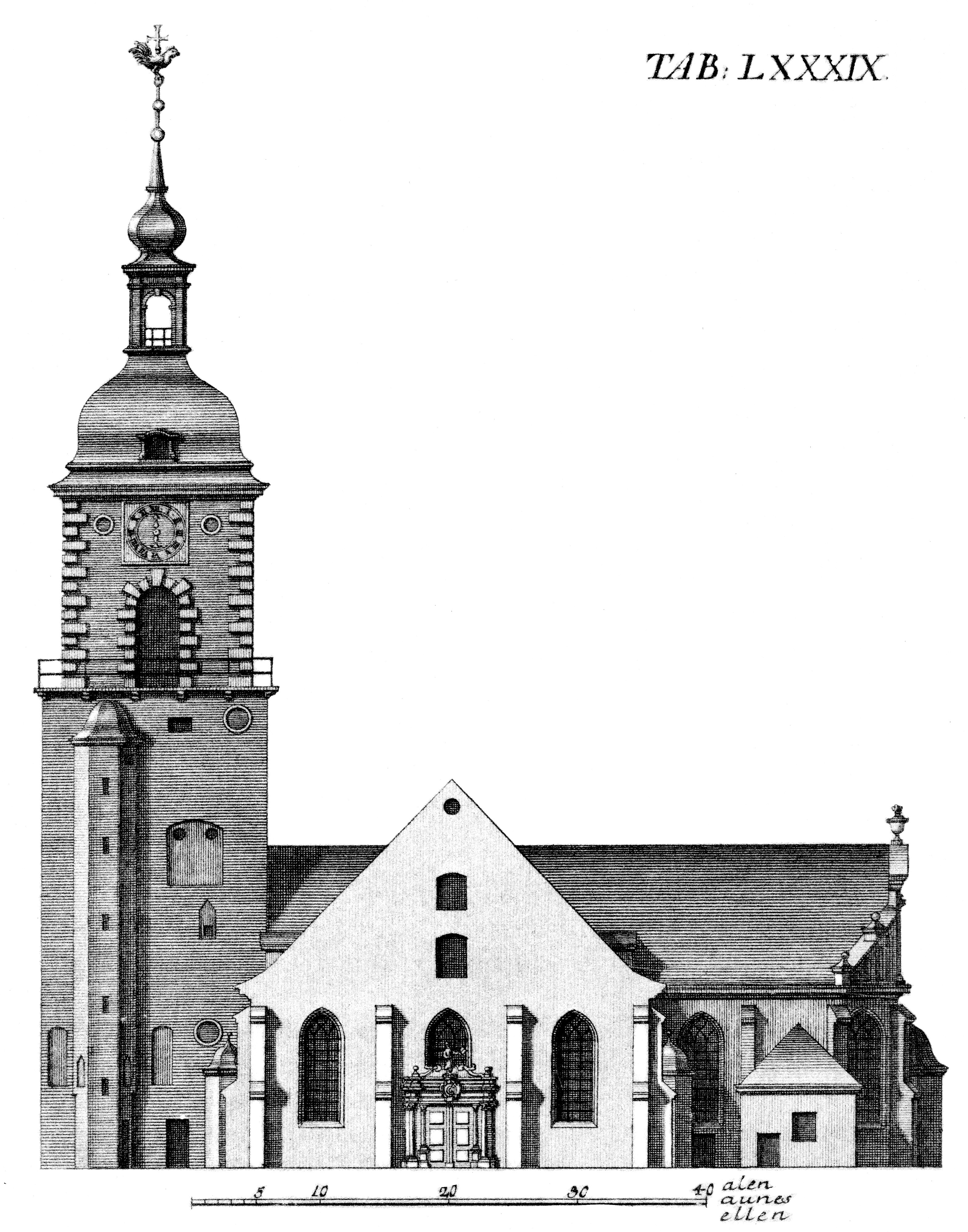
St. Peter's Church depicted in de Thurag's Hafnia Hodierna

St. Peter's Church was severely damaged in the Copenhagen Fire of 1728. The interior was lost to the flames but the outer walls were left intact and the church could fairly easily be rebuilt by Johan Cornelius Krieger. The church was first given a short lantern spire which was replaced by the current copper-clad spire in 1756-57. The spire survived the British bombardment during the Battle of Copenhagen in 1807.

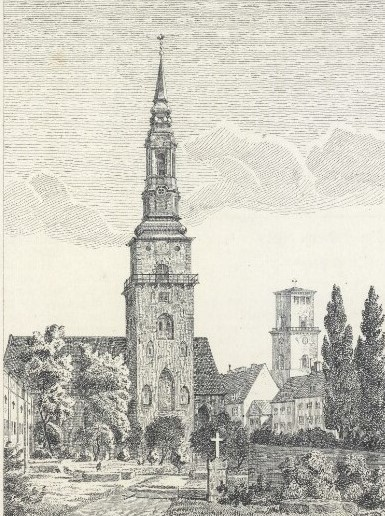
St. Peter's Church

With the increasing tensions between Denmark and Germany in the middle of the 19th century, culminating in the First Schleswig War from 1848 to 1850, the church lost its special position and therefore members, prestige and financial support.

As time passed, it became an impossible task for the congregation to maintain the large building complex, and in 1994 the state took over the church back into its care. It was transferred to the Palaces and Properties Agency, which in the late 90s carried out extensive restoration and partial restructuring under the direction of architect and professor Hans Munk Hansen.

== Architecture ==
St. Peter's Church was originally built as a single-nave church but with Christian IV's addition of the northern and southern transepts, it received the cruciform layout which characterizes it today. Most of the church, including the nave, the choir and the lower part of the tower, dates back to the middle of the 15th century. The main entrance is located in the southern transept and is marked by a richly carved Baroque portal from 1731, carved by the sculptor Diderik Gercken. The spire was built from 1756 to 1757 in Rococo style to the design of master-carpenter Johann Boye Junge.

== Sepulchral chapels ==
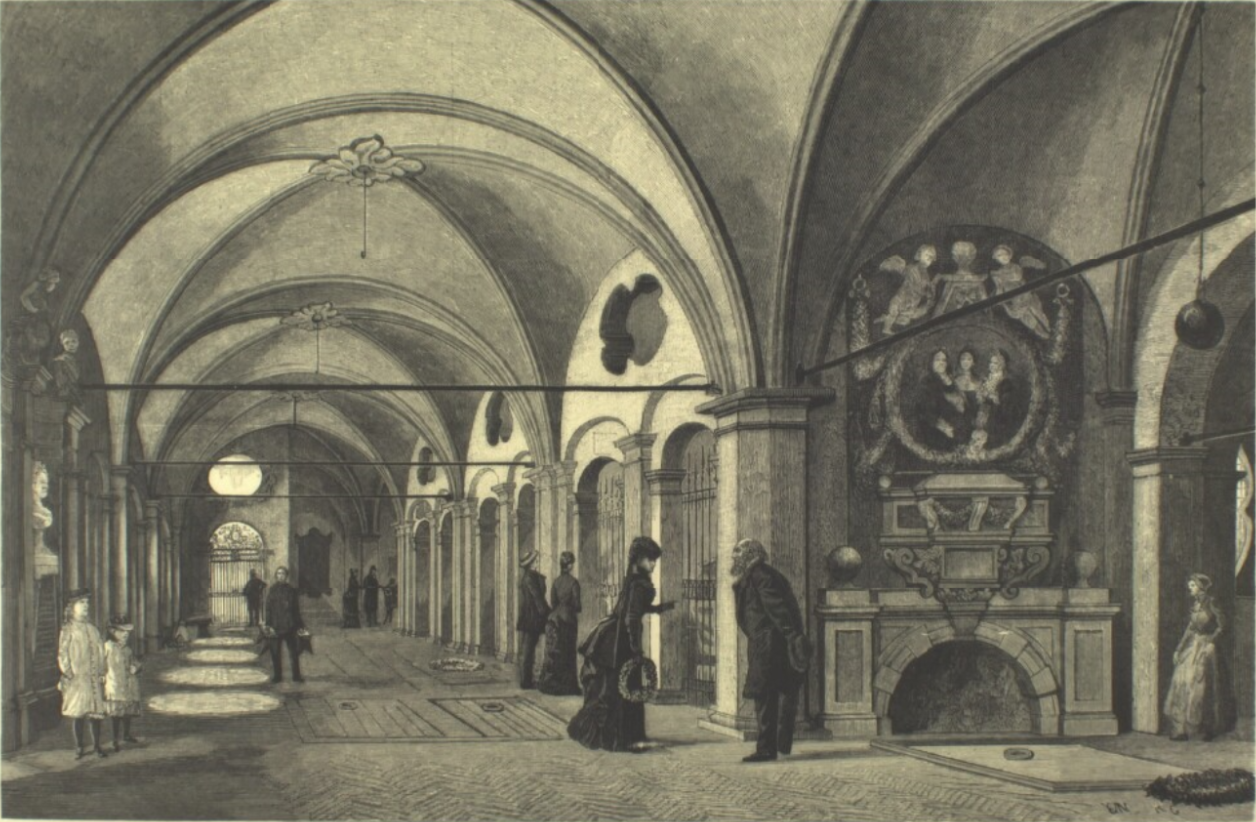
Interior of the chapel

The church has an extensive complex of sepulchral chapels which was commenced in 1643 and not completed until 1681-83 when Hans van Steenwinckel the Youngest completed a three wing chapel towards Larslejstræde. The complex contains numerous tombs and epitaphs of important German families in Denmark. Individual chapels contain sarcophagi of the most affluent deceased while other coffins are placed in three to four layers in underground crypts.

Many of the grave monuments were made by Johannes Wiedewelt and Andreas Weidenhaupt. Amongst the chapels lies the idyllic 'herb garden' (Danish: urtegården).

=== Interments ===
The interments include:

- Gottfried Becker (1767-1845), royal pharmacist
- Charlotte Dorothea Biehl (1731–1788), playwright
- Conrad Biermann von Ehrenschild (1629–1698), civil servant
- Christian Brandt
- Peter Brandt and Abigael Marie Brandt, née von Stöcken
- Robert Colnet
- Peter Cramer (1726–1782), painter
- Friederich Ehbisch (1672-1748), sculptor
- Valentin von Eickstedt (1669-1718), officer
- Christoffer Gabel (1617–1673), statesman
- Friedrich Carl von Gram
- Christian Gyldenløve (moved 1734 from Vor Frue Kirke)
- Wolfgang Haffner
- Nicolaj Helt
- Catharine Marie von Holstein
- Hans Friedrich von Holstein
- Johan Georg Holstein
- Albrecht Itzen
- Johan Boye Junge
- Kristian Kongstad
- Abraham Lehn
- Christian Lente
- Theodor Lente
- Niels Banner Matthisen
- Reinhold Meier
- Wigand Michelbecker
- Gerhard Morell
- Carl von Müller
- Otto Frederik Müller
- Bernhard Møllmann
- Christian Nerger
- Abraham Pelt
- Christian Siegfried von Plessen
- Carl Adolph von Plessen
- Marcus Gerhard Rosencrone
- Ernst Schimmelmann
- Johan Sigismund Schulin
- Henrik Stampe
- possibly Johann Friedrich Struensee (since the 1920s)
- Sir Walter Titley, British ambassador to Danmark
- Lorenz Tuxen
- Hans von Voscamp
- Georg Wilhelm Wahl
- Jørgen Walter /died 1670), military officer
- Andreas Weyse
- Daniel Benjamin Weyse
- Just Wiedewelt (1677–1757), sculptor

=== Churchyard ===
- Ernst Henrich Berling (1708–1750), printer and publisher
- Christian van Bracht (c. 1637 – 1720), court artist
- Johan van Bracht (died 1710), court artist
- Frederik Christian van Bracht (1720–1759), painter
- Constantin Brun (1746–1836), businessman
- Friederike Brun (1765–1835), writer and salonist
- Johannes Gottlieb de Bötticher (1676–1762), physician
- Nicolai Eigtved (1701–1754), architect
- Christian Ulrik Foltmar (c. 1716 - 1794) wallpaper weaver, painter of miniatures and organist
- Heinrich Egidius Gercken (died 1774), court gardener
- Jonas Haas (1720–1775), printmaker
- Johann Christopher Heimbrod (1724– 1733), sculptor. stone carver and stucco artist
- Johann Friedrich Hännel (c. 1710 – 1761), sculptor
- Juliane Marie Jessen (1760–1832), author and translator
- Martin Christian Gottlieb Lehmann (1775–1856), civil servant
- Ernst Heinrich Løffler (1723–1796), painter
- Balthasar Münter (1735–1793), priest
- Friederich Münter (1761–1830), scholar, professor of theology
- Carl Probsthayn (1770–1818), painter
- Johan Henrich Schønheyder
- Johan Martin Schønheyder
- Johan Adam Sturmberg
- Johan Christopher Sturmberg
- Martin Zumpe (c. 1697 – 1753), master builder

== St. Peter's Church today ==
The church is today owned by the Danish Palaces and Properties Agency but on a day-to-day basis the church is still used actively by the German-speaking Evangelical-Lutheran congregation with 900 members as part of the Danish National Church. The congregation arranges guided tours, concerts and other cultural events in the historic building. Together with the St. Peter's School (Danish: Skt. Petri Skole) and the St. Peter's Cultural Center (Danish: Skt. Petri Kulturcentrum), both of which are located on the church's premises, it forms a centre for German culture in Copenhagen.

== In popular culture ==
The church is used as a location in the 1991 drama film Drengene fra Sankt Petri.

== See also ==
- Christian's Church
- Reformed Church, Copenhagen
