= Sankt Petri Schule =

School in Copenhagen, Denmark

Location
- Larslejstræde 5, 1451 Copenhagen; Denmark
- 55.6798°N 12.5698°E

Information
- Type: Private
- Established: 1575
- Principal: Ulrikke Wandler (acting)
- Grades: 0–12
- Enrollment: 556 (2016)
- Website: sanktpetriskole.dk

Sankt Petri Schule (Danish: Sankt Petri Skole) is a German international private school in Copenhagen. The school, one of the oldest in Denmark dating its origins back to 1575, is located opposite St. Peter's Church, the Lutheran parish church of the German-speaking community in Copenhagen. Sankt Petri Schule is a member of the German Schools Abroad Network DAS.

== History ==
The school was founded by Theophilus Neovinus in 1575. For the first two centuries of its existence, the school was a charity school. A Sankt Petri Girls' School was founded by Balthasar Münter (father of the salonist Friederike Brun) in the second half of the 18th century.

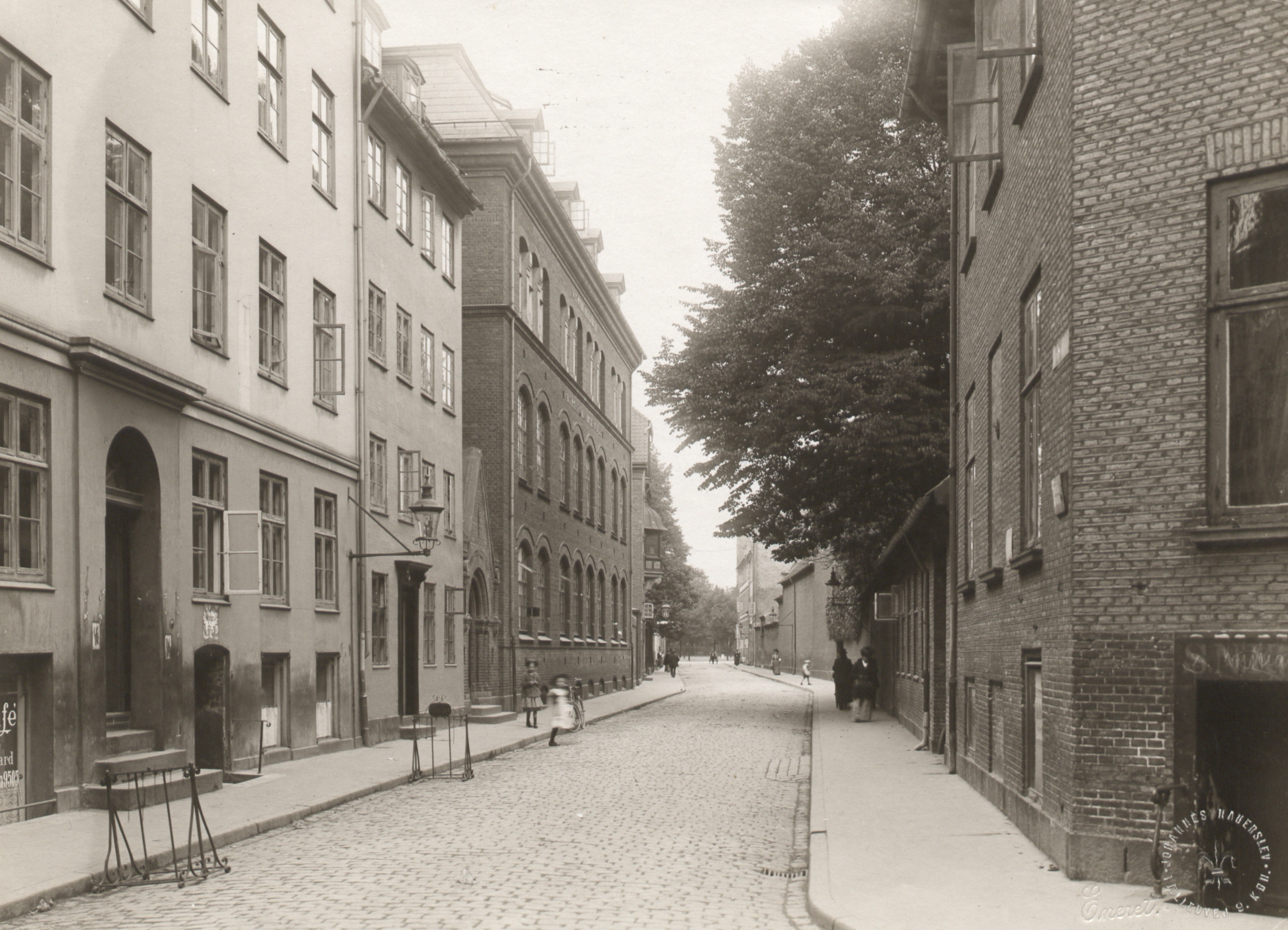
The school seen on a photograph by Johannes Hauerslev from the 1910s

A new building for the school was inaugurated at Larslejsstræde 5 in 1899. The complex also comprised a new home for Skt. Petri kirkes, Thymes og P.s plejestiftelse, a home for elderly indigent, German expatriates. It had been established in the beginning of the 19th century through a merger of three independent institutions: Thymes Stiftelse ('Thyme's Foundation'), founded by Winand Thyme in 1775; Pelts Stiftelse ('Pelt's Foundation'), founded by Abraham Pelt in 1779; and a third one operated by the church. Most of the residents were German expatriate women. In 1997, the building was sold to the school, which needed more space for its increasing number of students.

In 2010 a gymnasial superstructure was established. In the 2015–2016 school year, 17 students attended the 10th grade, eight students the 11th grade, and one student 12th grade.

== Buildings ==
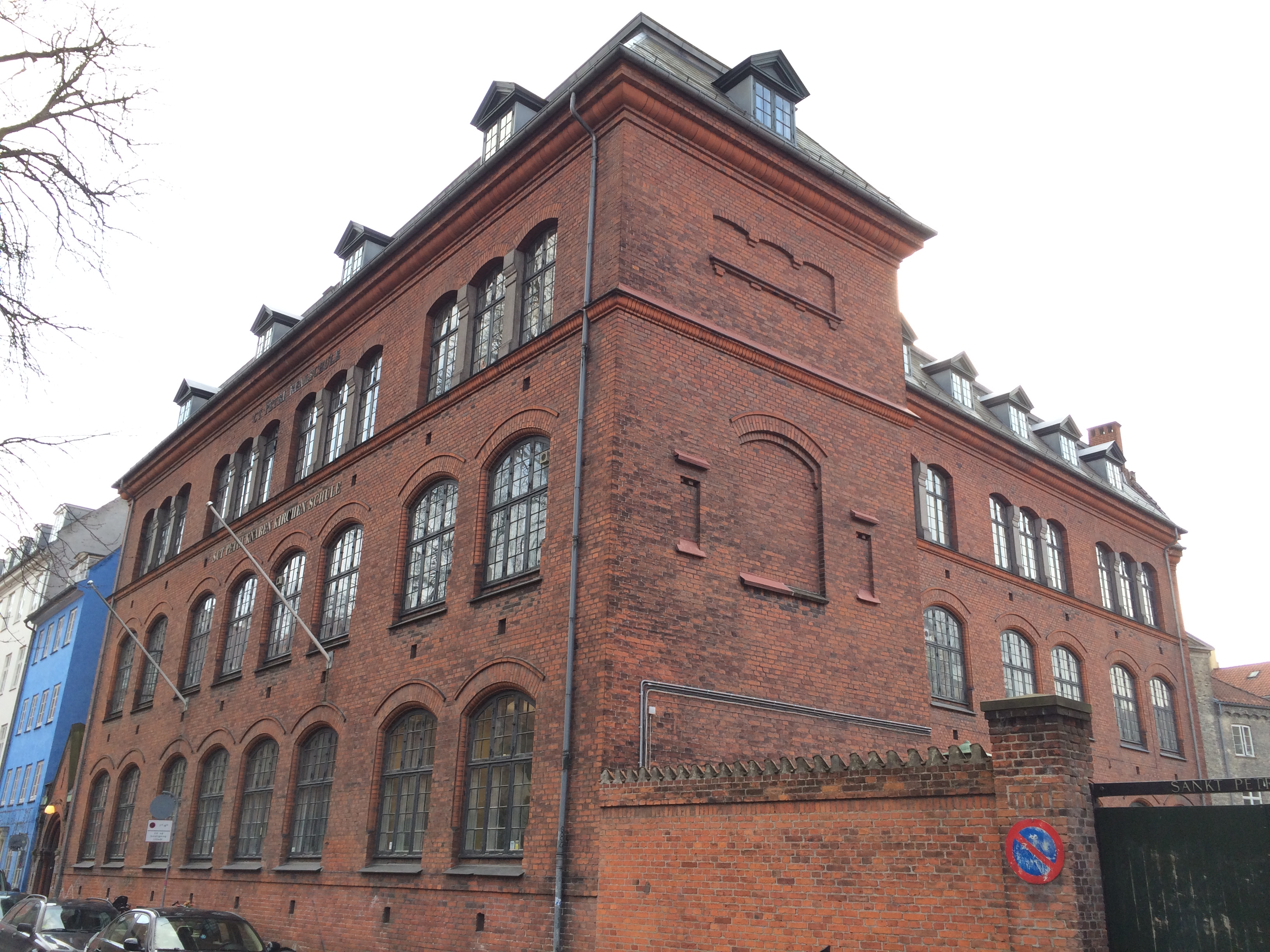
No. 5: The school's building from 1899

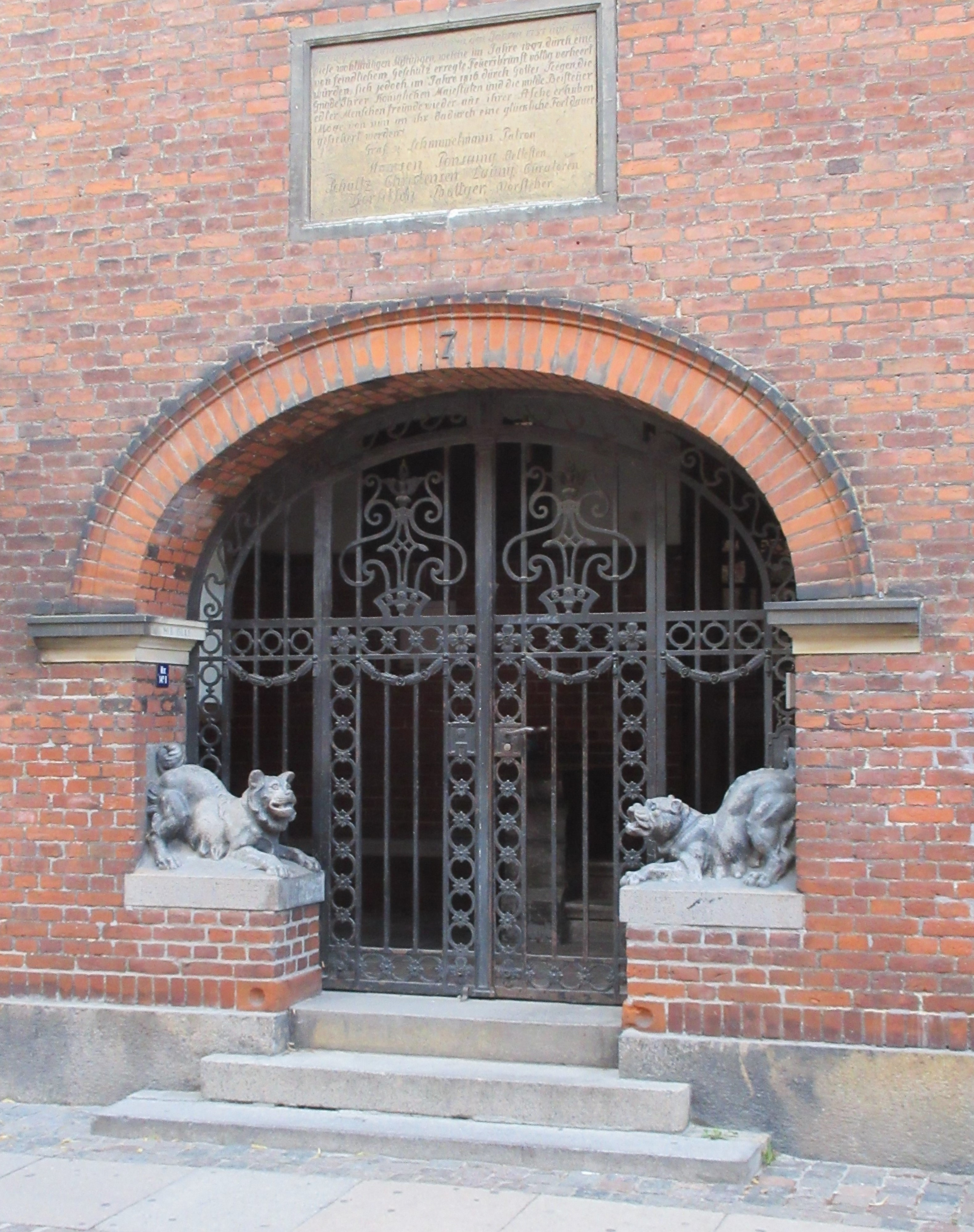
No. 7: Detail1899

The school building at Larslejstræde 5 is from 1899 and was designed by architect Frederik Levy. The school has also taken over the Pelts Plejestiftelse building at No. 7. This building is also from 1899 and was also designed by Frederik Levy. Both buildings are constructed in red brick with large, arched windows. No. 5 has a gate guarded by two granite lions.

== Programmes ==
The school serves levels kl. 0 to 12. Senior high school (gymnasium) has been offered since 2010 culminating with the Danish upper secondary school exit examination, the studentereksamen. The total number of pupils on the school roll is above 500.

== Notable students ==
- Lykke Friis (born 1969), Prorector for Education at University of Copenhagen and former Minister of Climate and Energy

== Literature ==
- Johannes Lehmann, P. H. Frosell, H. W. Praetorius: Die St. Petri Schulen in Kopenhagen 1575-1975. Ihre 400-jährige Geschichte. Kopenhagen 1975.
