= List of rectors of the University of Copenhagen =

Rector of the University of Copenhagen
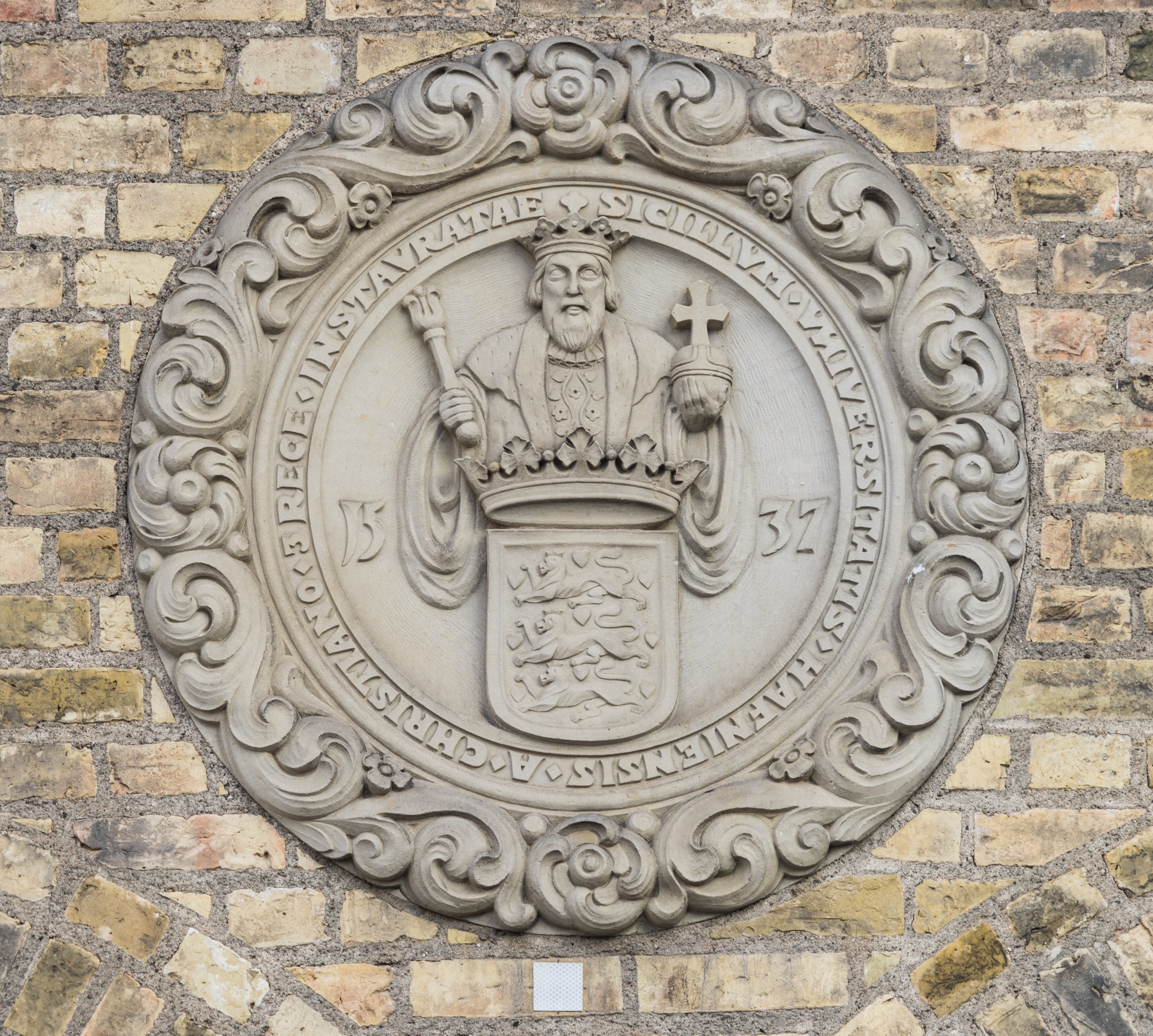
- Seal of the University

- Incumbent; Henrik Caspar Wegener since 11 November 2016
- University of Copenhagen
- Formation: 1479
- First holder: Jesper Henriksen

This is a list of rectors of the University of Copenhagen.

== List of rectors ==
From	To	Name	Reference
1479	1480	Jesper Henriksen	
1480	1480	Erik Nielsen Rosenkrantz	
1480	1481	Tilemann Schlecht	
1481	1482	Jørgen Hvid	
1482	1482	Peder David Skotte	
1482	1483	Jesper Henriksen	
1484	1487	Erik Nielsen Rosenkrantz	
1488	1489	Peder David Skotte	
1489	1490	Arnold Lauridsen	
1490	1491	Jørgen Hvid	
1491	1492	Peder Albertsen	
1492	1493	Erik Nielsen Rosenkrantz	
1493	1494	Jørgen Hvid	
1494	1495	Peder David Skotte	
1495	1496	Erik Nielsen Rosenkrantz	
1496	1497	Jørgen Hvid	
1496	1497	Erik Nielsen Rosenkrantz	
1497	1499	Hans Albertsen	
1499	1500	Peder David Skotte	
1500	1501	Anders Friis	
1501	1502	Erik Nielsen Rosenkrantz	
1502	1503	Paul Andersen	
1503	1504	Peder David Skotte	
1504	1505	Anders Friis	
1505	1507	Peter Petersen	
1507	1508	Johannes Luche	
1508	1509	Poul Reff	
1509	1510	Peder David Skotte	
1510	1511	Matthias Pedersen	
1511	1513	Anders Friis	
1513	1514	Ditlev Smyther	
1514	1515	Peder Albertsen	
1515	1516	Anders Friis	
1516	1517	Knud Valkendorf	
1517	1518	Alexander Kinghorn	
1518	1519	Christoffer Jacobsen Ravensberg	
1519	1520	Paul Andersen	
1520	1521	Amelung Amelungsen	
1520	1521	Paul Andersen	
1521	1522	Vincens Lunge	
1522	1524	Christen Torkelsen Morsing	
1524	1525	Ditlev Smyther	
1525	1526	Christoffer Jacobsen Ravensberg	
1526	1529	Claus Rosengaard	
1529	1531	Claus Urne	
1531	1532	Peder Svave	
1537	1538	Christen Torkelsen Morsing	
1538	1538	Peder Palladius	
1538	1539	Johan Bugenhagen	
1539	1539	Christen Torkelsen Morsing	
1539	1541	Tileman von Hussen	
1541	1542	Peder Povlsen	
1542	1543	Oluf Chrysostomus	
1543	1544	Peder Svave	
1544	1545	Johannes Machabæus	
1545	1546	Jens Andersen Sinning	
1546	1547	Christen Torkelsen Morsing	
1547	1548	Peter Capteyn	
1548	1549	Rembert Gilsheim	
1549	1550	Johannes Machabæus	
1550	1551	Niels Hemmingsen	
1551	1552	Peter Capteyn	
1552	1553	Albret Knoppert	
1553	1555	Peder Palladius	
1555	1556	Hans Albertsen	
1556	1557	Christian Torkelsen Morsing	
1557	1558	Albret Knoppert	
1558	1559	Niels Hemmingsen	
1559	1560	Jacob Bording	
1560	1561	Poul Madsen	
1561	1562	Erasmus Lætus	
1562	1564	Albret Knoppert	
1564	1565	Niels Hemmingsen	
1565	1566	Hans Frandsen	
1566	1567	Klaus Lauritsen Scavenius	
1567	1569	Hans Albertsen	
1569	1570	Albret Knoppert	
1570	1571	Johannes Sascerides	
1571	1573	Niels Hemmingsen	
1573	1575	Hans Frandsen	
1575	1577	Hans Thomesen Aurifaber	
1577	1578	Poul Madsen	
1578	1580	Anders Lemvig	
1580	1581	Klaus Hammer	
1581	1582	Anders Lauritzen	
1582	1584	Klaus Theophilius	
1584	1585	Klaus Lauritsen Scavenius	
1585	1586	Jakob Madsen Aarhus	
1586	1588	Anders Lemvig	
1588	1589	Hans Thomesen Aurifaber	
1589	1590	Poul Madsen	
1590	1592	Anders Christensen	
1592	1593	Johannes Sascerides	
1593	1594	Hans Olufsen Slangerup	
1594	1595	Klaus Theophilius	
1595	1596	Anders Krag	
1596	1597	Jørgen Christoffersen Dybvad	
1597	1598	Anders Lemvig	
1598	1599	Thomas Fincke	
1599	1600	Peder Jensen Winstrup	
1600	1601	Anders Christensen	
1601	1602	Niels Krag	
1602	1603	Hans Poulsen Resen	
1603	1604	Klaus Theophilius	
1604	1605	Ivar Stub	
1605	1606	Jørgen Christoffersen Dybvad	
1606	1607	Thomas Fincke	
1607	1608	Johannes Stephanius	
1608	1609	Peder Jensen Winstrup	
1609	1610	Gellius Sascerides	
1610	1611	Hans Rasmussen Skomager	
1611	1612	Hans Poulsen Resen	
1612	1613	Leonhard Metzner	
1613	1614	Hans Jensen Alanus	
1614	1615	Cort Aslakssøn	
1615	1616	Thomas Fincke	
1616	1617	Christen Sørensen Longomontanus	
1617	1618	Hans Poulsen Resen	
1618	1619	Caspar Bartholin the Elder	
1619	1620	Wolfgang Rhuman	
1620	1621	Cort Aslakssøn	
1621	1622	Claus Plum	
1622	1623	Hans Jensen Alanus	
1623	1624	Jesper Rasmussen Brochmand	
1624	1625	Thomas Fincke	
1625	1626	Christen Sørensen Longomontanus	
1626	1627	Hans Poulsen Resen	
1627	1628	Ole Worm	
1628	1629	Wolfgang Rhuman	
1629	1629	Caspar Bartholin the Elder	
1629	1630	Jesper Rasmussen Brochmand	
1630	1631	Claus Plum	
1631	1632	Hans Rasmussen Brochmand	
1632	1633	Niels Pedersen Aurilesius	
1633	1634	Thomas Fincke	
1634	1635	Christen Sørensen Longomontanus	
1635	1636	Jesper Rasmussen Brochmand	
1636	1637	Ole Worm	
1637	1637	Wolfgang Rhuman	
1637	1638	Jacob Fincke	
1638	1638	Hans Rasmussen Brochmand	
1638	1639	Jacob Fincke	
1639	1640	Claus Plum	
1640	1641	Christen Sørensen Longomontanus	
1641	1642	Hans Hansen Resen	
1642	1643	Ole Worm	
1643	1644	Jacob Fincke	
1644	1645	Niels Poulsen Schandorph	
1645	1646	Claus Plum	
1646	1647	Thomas Bang	
1647	1648	Laurits Mortensen Scavenius	
1648	1649	Ole Worm	
1649	1650	Peder Spormand	
1650	1651	Hans Hansen Svane	
1651	1652	Johan Müller	
1652	1653	Jacob Fincke	
1653	1654	Thomas Bang	
1654	1654	Ole Worm	
1654	1654	Thomas Bartholin	
1654	1656	Peder Spormand	
1656	1657	Jacob Knudsen	
1657	1658	Christen Ostenfeld	
1658	1659	Rasmus Enevoldsen Brochmand	
1658	1659	Jacob Knudsen	
1659	1661	Hans Wandal	
1661	1661	Johan Müller	
1661	1662	Peder Lauritsen Scavenius	
1662	1664	Bertel Casparsen Bartholin	
1664	1664	Rasmus Hansen Brochmand	
1664	1665	Christian Nold	
1665	1666	Thomas Bartholin	
1666	1667	Rasmus Bartholin	
1667	1668	Matthias Foss	
1668	1669	Christen Ostenfeld	
1669	1670	Bertel Bartholin	
1670	1671	Jørgen Witzleben	
1671	1672	Thomas Bartholin	
1672	1673	Jørgen Eilersen	
1673	1674	Jens Jensen Bircherod	
1674	1675	Rasmus Bartholin	
1675	1676	Ole Borch	
1676	1677	Christoffer Hansen Schletter	
1677	1679	Villum Worm	
1679	1680	Hans Bagger	
1680	1680	Thomas Bartholin	
1680	1681	Christian Nold	
1681	1682	Ole Borch	
1682	1683	Christian Nold	
1683	1684	Rasmus Bartholin	
1684	1685	Cosmus Bornemann	
1685	1686	Jens Jensen Bircherod	
1686	1687	Villum Worm	
1687	1688	Caspar Thomsen Bartholin	
1688	1689	Hans Wandal	
1689	1690	Cosmus Bornemann	
1690	1691	Holger Jacobsen	
1691	1692	Hector Gottfried Masius	
1692	1693	Caspar Thomsen Bartholin	
1693	1694	Ole Christensen Rømer	
1694	1695	Heinrich Bornemann	
1695	1697	Holger Jacobsen	
1697	1698	Hans Wandal	
1698	1699	Christian Reitzer	
1699	1700	Ole Christensen Rømer	
1700	1701	Hector Gottfried Masius	
1701	1703	Caspar Thomsen Bartholin	
1703	1704	Hans Thomsen Bartholin	
1704	1706	Hans Mikkelsen Mule	
1706	1708	Hans Wandal	
1708	1711	Christian Reitzer	
1711	1714	Hans Jensen Bircherod	
1714	1717	Hans Stenbuch	
1717	1720	Georg Frederik Franck de Franckenau	
1720	1722	Heinrich Weghorst	
1722	1723	Hans Thomsen Bartholin	
1723	1726	Johannes de Buchwald	
1726	1729	Anders Frølund	
1729	1731	Søren Lintrup	
1731	1731	Johannes de Buchwald	
1731	1732	Christian Bagger	
1732	1733	Hans Gram	
1733	1734	Hans Stenbuch	
1734	1735	Georg Detharding	
1735	1736	Ludvig Holberg	
1736	1737	Marcus Wöldike	
1737	1738	Andreas Hojer	
1738	1739	Peder Nielsen Horrebow	
1739	1740	Jeremias Friedrich Reuss	
1740	1741	Balthazar Johannes de Buchwald	
1741	1742	Christian Thestrup	
1742	1743	Marcus Wöldike	
1743	1744	Georg Detharding	
1744	1745	Hans Gram	
1745	1746	Søren Bloch	
1746	1747	Christian Ludvig Scheidt	
1747	1748	Peder Nielsen Horrebow	
1748	1749	Jeremias Friedrich Reuss	
1749	1750	Balthazar Johannes de Buchwald	
1750	1751	Peder Holm	
1751	1752	Hans Peter Anchersen	
1752	1753	Peder Kofoed Ancher	
1753	1754	Johan Christian Kall	
1754	1755	Peder Rosenstand-Goiske	
1755	1756	Christen Lodberg Friis	
1756	1757	Bernhard Møllmann	
1757	1758	Hans Otto Bang	
1758	1759	Balthazar Johan de Buchwald	
1759	1760	Hans Peter Anchersen	
1760	1761	Peder Holm	
1761	1762	Johan Christian Kall	
1762	1763	Peder Kofoed Ancher	
1763	1764	Peder Rosenstand-Goiske	
1764	1765	Bernhard Møllmann	
1765	1766	Christian Gottlieb Kratzenstein	
1766	1767	Johan Andreas Cramer	
1767	1768	Peder Kofoed Ancher	
1768	1769	Christen Horrebow	
1769	1770	Peder Holm	
1770	1771	Johan Christian Kall	
1771	1772	Christian Gottlieb Kratzenstein	
1772	1773	Martin Hübner	
1773	1774	Nicolai Edinger Balle	
1774	1775	Peder Kofoed Ancher	
1775	1776	Hector Frederik Janson	
1776	1777	Christen Friis Rottbøll	
1777	1778	Balthazar Gebhard de Obelitz	
1778	1779	Claus Frees Hornemann	
1779	1780	Christian Gottlieb Kratzenstein	
1780	1780	Johan Heinrich Schlegel	
1780	1782	Nicolai Edinger Balle	
1782	1783	Jacob Edvard Colbiørnsen	
1783	1784	Abraham Kall	
1784	1785	Hector Frederik Janson	
1785	1786	Christian Gottlieb Kratzenstein	
1786	1787	Børge Riisbrigh	
1787	1788	Claus Frees Hornemann	
1788	1789	Jacob Edvard Colbiørnsen	
1789	1790	Thomas Bugge	
1790	1791	Daniel Gotthilf Moldenhawer	
1791	1792	Lauritz Nørregaard	
1792	1793	Nicolai Christoffer Kall	
1793	1794	Claus Frees Hornemann	
1794	1795	Jacob Baden	
1795	1796	Mathias Saxtorph	
1796	1797	Friederich Münter	
1797	1798	Mathias Saxtorph	
1798	1799	Abraham Kall	
1799	1800	Daniel Gotthilf Moldenhawer	
1800	1801	Johan Clemens Tode	
1801	1802	Thomas Bugge	
1802	1803	Friederich Münter	
1803	1804	Johan Frederik Vilhelm Schlegel	
1804	1805	Nicolai Christoffer Kall	
1805	1806	Claus Frees Hornemann	
1806	1807	Frederik Ludvig Bang	
1807	1808	Niels Treschow	
1808	1809	Peter Erasmus Müller	
1809	1810	Frederik Theodor Hurtigkarl	
1810	1811	Thomas Bugge	
1811	1812	Claus Frees Hornemann	
1812	1813	Johan Frederik Vilhelm Schlegel	
1813	1814	Børge Thorlacius	
1814	1815	Peter Erasmus Müller	
1815	1816	Johan Sylvester Saxtorph	
1816	1817	Jacob Andreas Wolf	
1817	1818	Claus Frees Hornemann	
1818	1819	Frederik Theodor Hurtigkarl	
1819	1820	Johan David Herholdt	
1820	1821	Niels Schow	
1821	1822	Gregers Wad	
1822	1823	Jens Møller	
1823	1824	Matthias Hastrup Bornemann	
1824	1825	Ole Bang	
1825	1826	Hans Christian Ørsted	
1826	1827	Knud Lyne Rahbek	
1827	1828	Peter Erasmus Müller	
1828	1829	Johan Frederik Vilhelm Schlegel	
1829	1830	Johan Sylvester Saxtorph	
1830	1831	Jens Wilken Hornemann	
1831	1832	Adam Oehlenschläger	
1832	1833	Jens Møller	
1833	1834	Janus Lauritz Andreas Kolderup-Rosenvinge	
1834	1835	Johan David Herholdt	
1835	1836	Christian Thorning Engelstoft	
1836	1837	Erich Christian Werlauff	
1837	1838	Henrik Nicolai Clausen	
1838	1839	Johannes Ephraim Larsen	
1839	1840	Ole Bang	
1840	1841	Hans Christian Ørsted	
1841	1842	Peter Oluf Brøndsted	
1842	1843	Carl Emil Scharling	
1843	1844	Anton Wilhelm Scheel	
1844	1845	Daniel Frederik Esricht	
1845	1846	Frederik Christian Sibbern	
1846	1847	Adam Oehlenschläger	
1847	1848	Christian Thorning Engelstoft	
1848	1849	Frederik Christian Bornemann	
1849	1850	Sophus August Vilhelm Stein	
1850	1851	Hans Christian Ørsted	
1851	1853	Henrik Nicolai Clausen	
1853	1855	Johannes Ephraim Larsen	
1855	1857	Johan Nicolai Madvig	
1857	1859	Johannes Forchhammer	
1859	1861	Frederik Christian Bornemann	
1861	1862	Carl Emil Scharling	
1862	1863	Henrik Nicolai Clausen	
1863	1864	Johan Nicolai Madvig	
1864	1865	Henrik Nicolai Clausen	
1865	1866	Frederik Terkel Julius Gram	
1866	1867	Johan Nicolai Madvig	
1867	1868	Niels Ludvig Westergaard	
1868	1869	Andreas Buntzen	
1869	1870	Henrik Nicolai Clausen	
1870	1871	Johan Nicolai Madvig	
1871	1872	Andreas Aagesen	
1872	1873	Adolph Steen	
1873	1874	Christen Hermansen	
1874	1875	Johannes Magnus Valdemar Nellemann	
1875	1876	Johan Louis Ussing	
1876	1877	Peter Ludvig Panum	
1877	1878	Carl Valentin Holten	
1878	1879	Johan Nicolai Madvig	
1879	1880	August Hermann Ferdinand Carl Goos	
1880	1881	Rasmus Nielsen	
1881	1882	Johannes Frederik Johnstrup	
1882	1883	Peter Edvard Holm	
1883	1884	Carl Martinus Reisz	
1884	1885	Carl Henrik Scharling	
1885	1886	Johan Louis Ussing	
1886	1887	Hans Peter Jørgen Julius Thomsen	
1887	1888	Hans William Scharling	
1888	1889	Carl Edvard With	
1889	1890	Peder Madsen	
1890	1891	Edvard Holm	
1898	1899	Carl M. Reisz	
1899	1900	Johannes Steenstrup	
1900	1901	Thorvald Nicolai Thiele	
1901	1902	Vilhelm Thomsen	
1902	1903	Harald Høffding	
1903	1904	Peder Madsen	
1904	1905	Julius Lassen	
1905	1906	Christian Bohr	
1906	1907	Hieronymus Georg Zeuthen	
1907	1908	Martin Clarentius Gertz	
1908	1909	Carl Torp	
1909	1910	Carl Julius Salomonsen	
1910	1911	Kristian Erslev	
1911	1912	Frants Buhl	
1912	1913	Hector Jungersen	
1913	1914	J. C. Jacobsen	
1914	1915	Harald Westergaard	
1915	1916	Johan Ludvig Heiberg	
1916	1917	Knud Faber	
1917	1918	Wilhelm Johannsen	
1918	1919	Viggo Bentzon	
1919	1920	Thorkild Rovsing	
1920	1921	Otto Jespersen	
1921	1922	Einar Biilmann	
1922	1923	Johannes Bock	
1923	1924	Hans Vilhelm Munch-Petersen	
1924	1925	Frederik Torm	
1925	1926	Johannes Fibiger	
1926	1927	Holger Pedersen	
1927	1928	Martin Knudsen	
1928	1929	Johannes Hjelmslev	
1929	1930	Johannes Oskar Andersen	
1930	1931	Lauritz Vilhelm Birck	
1931	1932	Carl Edvard Bloch	
1932	1933	Aage Friis	
1933	1934	Niels Erik Nørlund	
1934	1935	Johannes Østrup	
1935	1936	Axel Nielsen	
1936	1942	Carl Edvard Bloch	
1942	1948	Jens Nørregaard	
1948	1956	Hans Marinus Hansen	
1956	1958	Erik Johan Warburg	
1958	1966	Carl Iversen	
1966	1972	Mogens Fog	
1972	1976	Thor A. Bak	
1976	1979	Morten Lange	
1979	1982	Erik Skinhøj	
1982	1994	Ove Nathan	
1994	2002	Kjeld Møllgård	
2002	2005	Linda Nielsen	
2005	2017	Ralf Hemmingsen	
2017	incumbent	Henrik Caspar Wegener	
