= Historiographer Royal (Denmark) =

Former governmental position

Kongelig historiograf (Historicus Regius, "Historiographer Royal") was a position in the kingdom of Denmark-Norway (after 1814 Denmark) between 1594 and 1883. The office was originally created with the aim of producing a national history of Denmark from the 13th century, a "continuation of Saxo", improving upon the first such work, published in the vernacular in 1600 by Arild Huitfeldt.

The office is not to be confused with that of kongelig ordenshistoriograf, the position of official historian of the Danish system of orders which was established in 1808 and remains in existence today. The parallel office in Sweden was established in 1618, in England in 1660 and in Scotland in 1681.

== List of Historiographers Royal ==
- Niels Krag, 1594–1602
- Jon Jakobsen Venusinus, 1602–1608
- Claus Christoffersen Lyschander, 1616–1623/4
- Johannes Isacius Pontanus, 1618–1639 (appointed jointly with Lyschander)
- Johannes Meursius, 1624–1639
- Stephan Hansen Stephanius, 1639–1650
- Vitus Bering, 1650–1675
- Ivar Nielsen Hertzholm (uncertain, mentioned as royal historian in the first edition of Dansk biografisk leksikon, but not in the improved third edition).
- Willum Worm, 1679–1704
- Christoff Heinrich Amthor, 1714–1721
- Andreas Hojer, 1722–1730
- Hans Gram, 1730–1748
- Bernhard Møllmann
- Peter Frederik Suhm, 1787–1798
- Ove Malling, 1809–1829
- Caspar Frederik Wegener, 1847–1883
