= Historiographer Royal =

Historiographer Royal is the title of an appointment as official chronicler or historian of a court or monarch. It was initially particularly associated with the French monarchy, where the post existed from at least the mid 15th century, but in the later 16th and 17th centuries became common throughout Europe. The Historiographer Royal for Scotland is still an existing appointment.

== See also ==
- Historiographer Royal (Denmark)
- Historiographer Royal (England)
- Ch'unch'ugwan (Korea)
- Chief Chronicler of the Kingdom (Portugal)
- Historiographer Royal (Scotland)
- Rikshistoriograf (Sweden)
