= Claus Christoffersen Lyschander =

Danish poet and historian

Claus Christoffersen Lyschander (also Lyscander, Lyskander; 1558–1623/4) was a Danish poet and historian.

A native of Nørre Vram, Skåne, Denmark (now in Bjuv Municipality, Sweden), his boyhood was affected by the Northern Seven Years' War, some of his older siblings and his mother fell victim to the epidemics which accompanied the war. After the war, he was schooled in Herrisvad convent school. His earliest known period in Danish and Latin was composed at the age of 20. He studied at Rostock university under David Chytraeus. He spent several years in Germany, possibly studying at the university at Wittenberg. In January 1587 wrote a letter of recommendation for Lyschander to Frederick II. Lyschander was made pastor of Herfølge and Sædder parishes, one of the more prestigious positions in Zealand, where he replaced Jon Jakobsen Venusinus whom he later also succeeded as Royal Historian. Lyschander married in 1588 and was appointed dean at Bjæverskov Herred (Præstø County). He published several historiographical works in verse form between 1608 and 1623.

He was appointed Royal Historian (kongelig historiograf) by Christian IV in 1616, charged with compiling a national historiography of Denmark "after Saxo" (i.e. covering the 13th century onward). The work was scheduled for six years, but Lyschander laid out a plan of 116 volumes. Maybe because it seemed unlikely that Lyschander was able to complete the national history within the appointed time, royal chancellor Christian Friis appointed Johan Isaksson Pontanus with the same task as Lyschander, but Lyschander was allowed to continue to work on his own project. In 1619, Lyschander presented a draft version of his Synopsis Historiae Danicae, which was published in 1622 (now known under the title of Danske Kongers Slægtebog "Genealogy of the Danish kings").
