= Ditlev Torm =

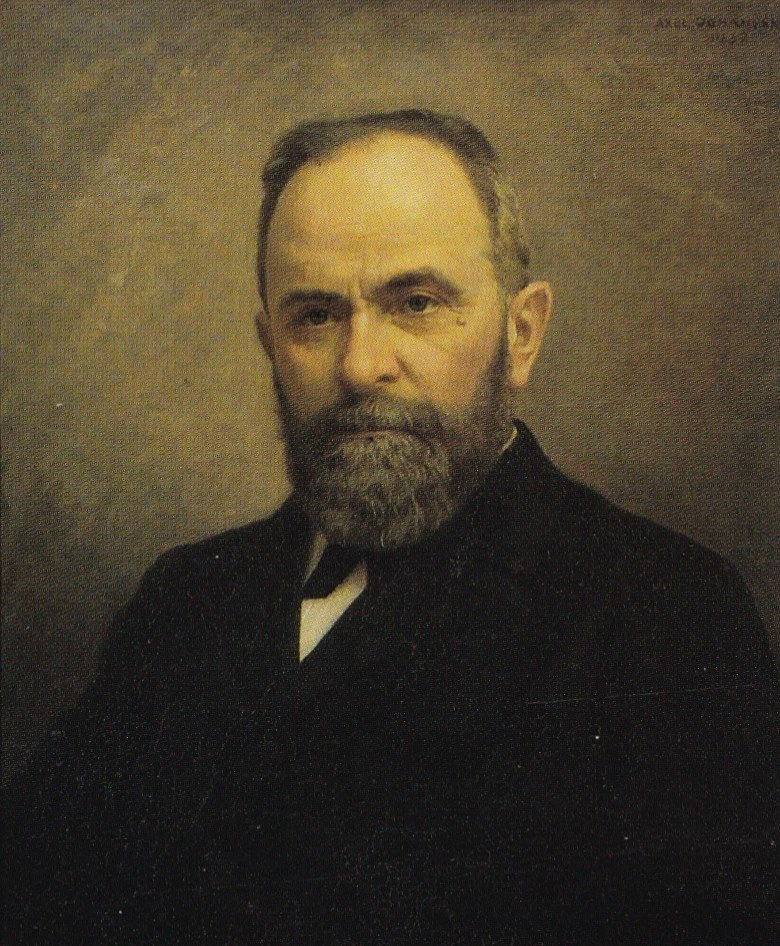
- Torm painted posthumously by Axel Johansen
- Born: 24 April 1836; Aalborg, Denmark
- Died: 22 November 1907 (aged 71); Copenhagen, Denmark
- Occupation: Businessman
- Awards: Knight of the Order of the Dannebrog, 1902

Ditlev Emanuel Torm (24 April 1836 – 22 November 1907) was a Danish businessman and co-founder of the shipping company Dampskibsselskabet Torm.

== Early life and education ==
Torm was born in Aalborg, the son of merchant and later shipbroker in Randers Ulrich Frederik T. (1801–1866) and Severine Birgitte Friis (1803–1881). He went to sea at the age of 14 and passed his exams as a navigator in 1853. He then served aboard English, German and American vessels. In 1862, he was also certified as an English mate in Hong Kong. He spent the next ten years in the Far East with only one short interruption.

== Career ==
After his return to Denmark, Torm initially worked for Dampskibsselskabet København. He left the company when he was treated unfairly in connection with the wrecking of S.S. Fyn. In 1879, he started Dampskibsselskabet Bornholm with a single steam vessel. In 1889. he then founded Dampskibsselskabet Torm in a partnership with Christian Schmiegelow. The company had an initial capital of DKK 212,000. Torm headed the office while Schmiegelow sailed their first ship, the steamer S.S. Alice. The company's fleet grew steadily. It focused on the Baltic Sea and North Sea.

Torm served as president of Fællesrepræsentationen for dansk skibsfart from 1900 to 1907 and also as president of Den Permanente Voldgiftskommission. He was also a member of the Maritime and Commercial Court (Sø- og handelsretten).

== Personal life ==
Torm married Elise Helene Mathilde Zoéga (30 January 1846 – 16 March 1918) on 28 March 1868 in Flensburg. Their son, Frederik Torm, was a theologian.

Torm died on 22 November 1907 in Copenhagen. He is buried in Assistens Cemetery.
