= Christian Gottlieb Kratzenstein =

German-born medical doctor, physicist and engineer

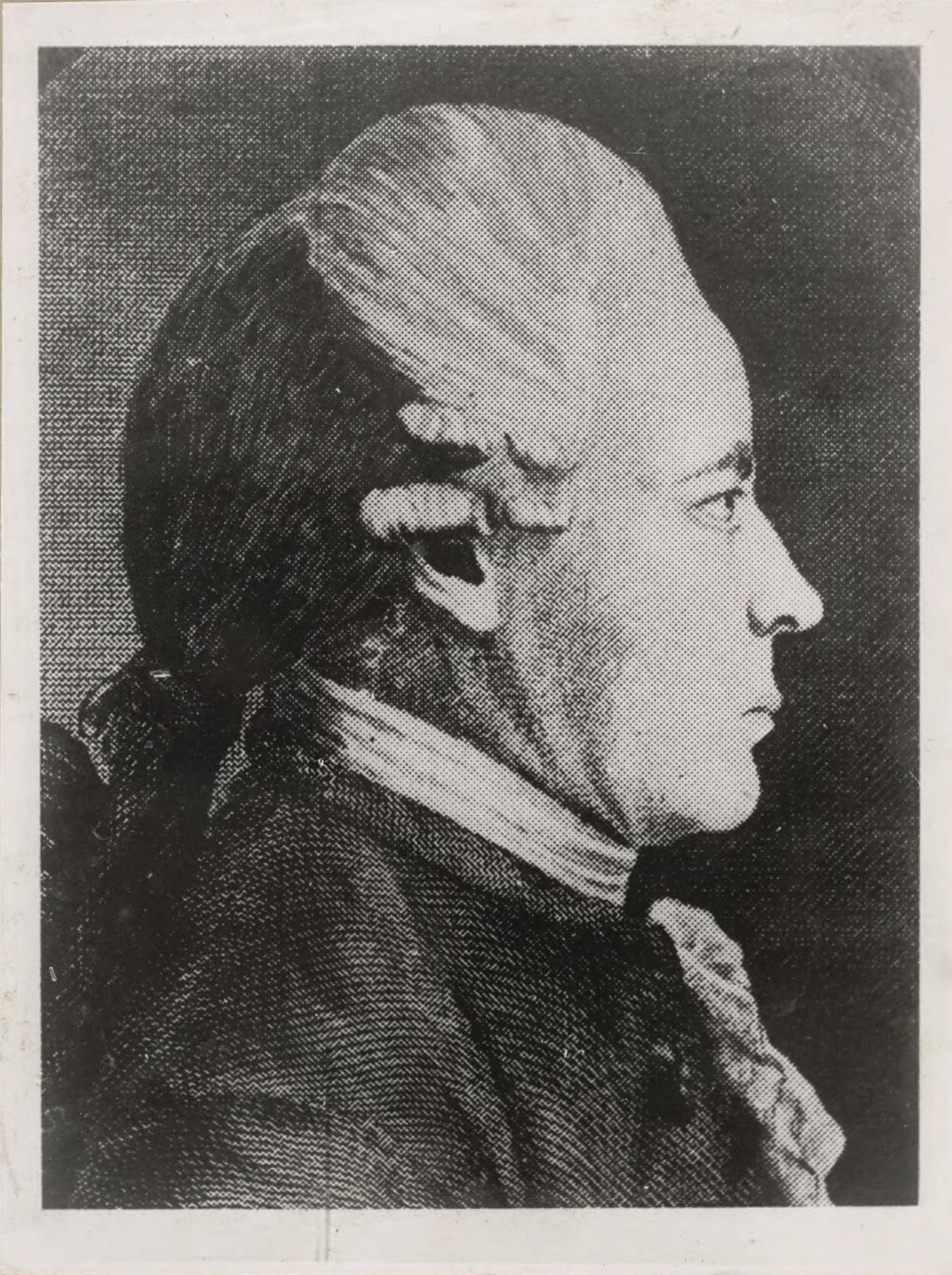
Christian Gottlieb Kratzenstein. Copper etching based on drawing by Paul Ipsen, 1781.

Christian Gottlieb Kratzenstein (30 January 1723, Wernigerode – 6 July 1795, Copenhagen) was a German-born medical doctor, physicist and engineer. From 1753 to the end of his life he was a professor at the University of Copenhagen where he served as rector four times. He is especially known for his investigations of the use of electricity in medicine and the first attempts at mechanical speech synthesis. As a teacher he wrote the first textbook on experimental physics in the united kingdom of Denmark-Norway.

== Biography ==
Kratzenstein was baptized on 2 February 1723 in Wernigerode, Sachsen-Anhalt, Holy Roman Empire and grew up there in an academic family together with three brothers. His father gave them a good upbringing and education. During the years 1733–1742 he attended the Latin school in the same city. Already at this age he was recognized for his interests in reading and learning. He was especially fascinated by the latest discoveries within the natural sciences and mechanics.

In 1742 Kratzenstein started to study physics and medicine at the university in Halle which at that time had a leading position in that region. His interests turned now to the investigations of electricity and in particular the effects on living organisms. After four years he received in 1746 doctoral degrees in physics and in medicine. He was then only 23 years old. After two years as a privatdozent he was in 1748 elected to the Academy of Sciences Leopoldina in the same city.

At that time Kratzenstein had achieved international recognition and was in 1748 called to the science academy in Saint Petersburg. It is likely that Leonhard Euler, who had worked there earlier before he took up a new position at the Prussian Academy of Sciences in Berlin, had used his influence in this connection. He had corresponded with Kratzenstein over a period of several years.

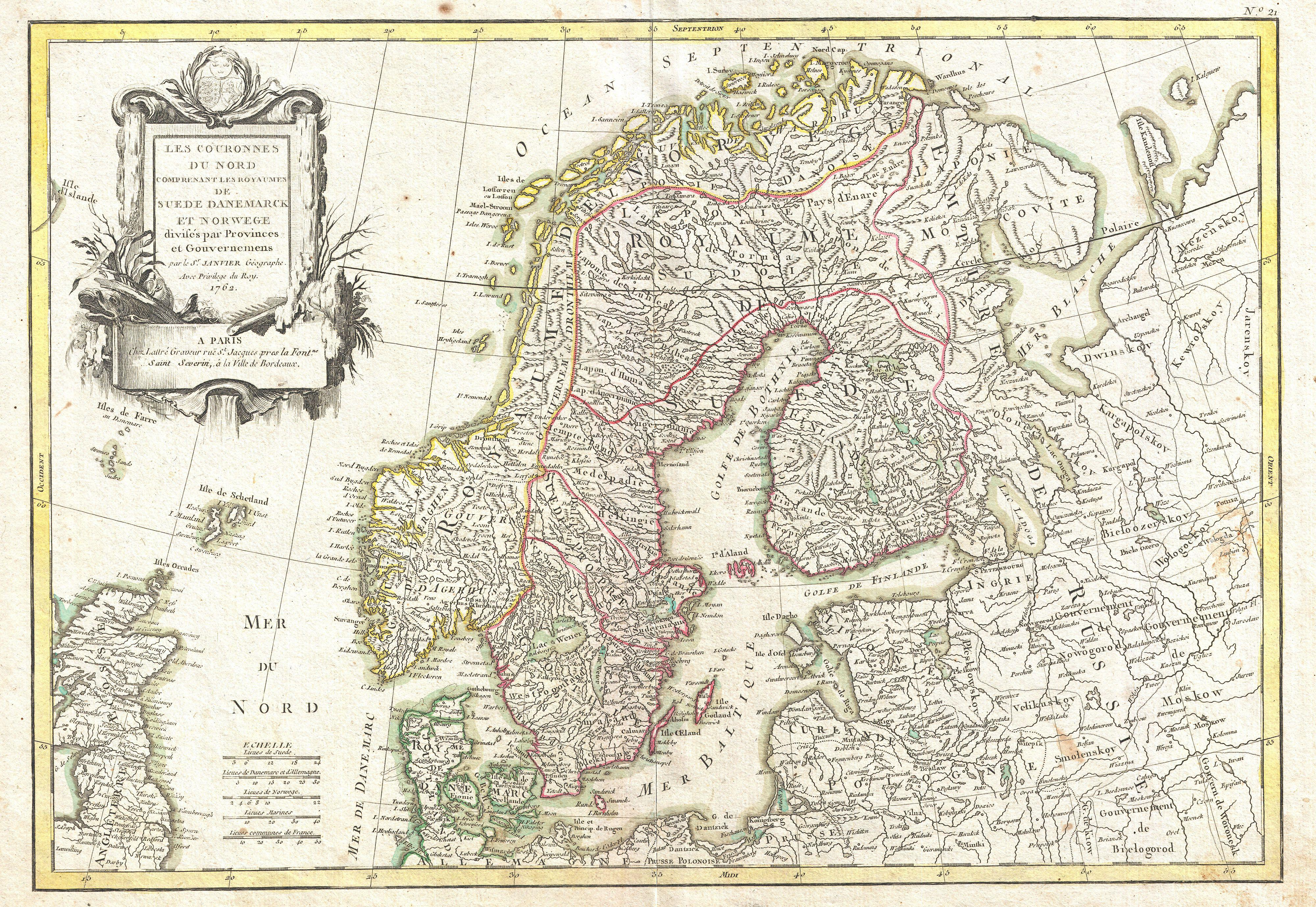
A Janvier map of Scandinavia from 1762. Kratzenstein had discovered that the coast of Norway was 150 km too far east on the maps then in use.

In his new position Kratzenstein worked among other projects on improving instruments for navigation on the open seas. These were tried out in 1753 on a ship expedition from Arkhangelsk along the Norwegian coast through Kattegat and the Baltic Sea back to Saint Petersburg. During the voyage he had made a stop-over in Copenhagen and received a short time later an offer from the university there. In the fall of 1753 he was appointed professor of experimental physics and medicine. At the same time he was elected to the Royal Danish Academy of Sciences and Letters. He would remain in that city until his death.

Kratzenstein became known in a short time as an engaging lecturer and attracted a large audience of both regular students and interested persons from the citizenry. He covered topics ranging from the newest insights about plants and animals, through geology, physiology to physics and chemistry. At that time there were often rather diffuse separations between these disciplines. When he died, he had saved 12,000 riksdaler, which were bestowed to the university. A few years later this fund enabled Hans Christian Ørsted to build up his own laboratory for physical experiments.

His work at the university strengthened the academic standards and manifested itself in many ways. Thus it was Kratzenstein who seized the initiative before the important transits of Venus in 1761 and 1769 instead of the astronomers at the Rundetårn observatory. In order to spread the impact of his lectures he wrote a textbook in experimental physics. It was published in several editions and appeared in German, French and Latin in addition to the Danish version. As a result of all his efforts and engagements he served as rector at the university during four periods.

During his time in Copenhagen he maintained contacts with his former colleagues in Saint Petersburg. The science academy there announced in 1778 a prize competition concerning the mechanisms behind the vowels A, E, I, O and U in human speech. Euler had previously been interested in this problem and it is likely that he was behind the formulation of the task. Kratzenstein won the first prize in 1780 by constructing a «vowel organ» which could produce these special sounds. This represents one of the first contributions to modern speech synthesis.

By his wide range of engagements and temperament Kratzenstein would often end up in conflicts with his colleagues. In later years he suffered in addition from illnesses which could have been caused by his chemical experiments. After his wife Anna Margrethe Hagen, with whom he had four children, died in 1783, he actively sought a new wife and married the year after Anna Maria Thuun from Hamburg. At the big fire in Copenhagen 1795 he lost most of his possessions and scientific equipment. He moved out to the suburb Frederiksberg where he died a month later.

== Important contributions ==
Kratzenstein was a polymath and a typical representative of the Enlightenment. New ideas and discoveries were changing the understanding of the world. Observations and experiments should replace old dogmas and superstition. This conviction characterized the whole life of Kratzenstein whose curiosity led him in many directions. He excelled more by practical investigations and building of instruments than by developing new theoretical insights that would survive his own times.

=== Body and soul ===
As a student in Halle Kratzenstein made his first step to fame by his pamphlet Beweis, dass die Seele ihren Körper baue in 1743. This was typical for the philosophical discourse at the university at that time. In this work he discussed the location of the soul in the body and how living organisms can continue to function after amputations and other severe changes to the body. If animals also had a soul, one had to explain what it does in a polyp which can grow up from a smaller part of an existing polyp. Such questions continued to occupy him in the following years in Halle where he also investigated parasites in the human body, for example tapeworms.

At the same time in 1744 he also wrote the essay Théorie sur l'Elévation des Vapeurs et des Exhalaisons dans l'Air in a prize competition announced by the science academy in Bordeaux. Here he is the physicist trying to arrive at a more microscopic explanation of what today are called gases and vapors. He estimated that a drop of water would transform into five hundred million smaller pieces by evaporation.

=== Electricity and electrotherapy ===
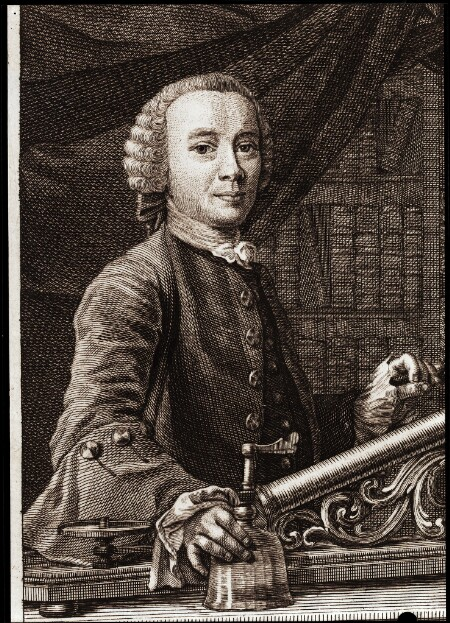
Kratzenstein, copper etching based by Jonas Haas, 1758.

Already during his upbringing in Wernigerode had Kratzenstein become acquainted with electrostatic generators and seen the effects an electric current could have. This interest he widened during his studies in Halle with a special emphasis on the potential use of electricity in medicine. His thoughts in this direction he published in 1744 under the title Abhandlung von dem Nutzen der Electricität in der Arzeneiwissenschaft. From experiments and observations he had seen how electricity could affect the human pulse and perspiration. In the same way he saw how electrical discharges could heal certain neurological disorders. These ideas were later taken up by others and developed into what today is generically called electrotherapy.

Based on these ideas and investigations by Kratzenstein there have been speculations that he could have been a model for the fictitious doctor Frankenstein in the book of the same name written by Mary Shelley several decades later.

Two years later Kratzenstein wrote the more theoretical work Theoria electricitatis mores geometrica explicata on the nature of electricity. Around this time he made measurements to find out how the electric force between two charged objects varied with their separation. On the theoretical side he argued that the electric current was due to the motion of two fluids which today would correspond to the flow of positive and negative electric charges. The charges themselves should be due to vortices in these fluids. Around the same time Benjamin Franklin explained the same phenomena based on a one-fluid picture where negative charge was due to a lack of positive charge. It was this explanation that prevailed.

Together with a similar thesis about bodily fluids and their properties, Kratzenstein received in 1746 a doctor's degree both in physics and in medicine.

=== Navigation ===
During the five years at the science academy in Saint Petersburg Kratzenstein was to a large extent occupied by improving methods and equipment for navigation on the high seas. The magnetic compass was made more reliable, astronomical observations should be made more precise together with the development of more accurate clocks to be used on ships for the determination of geographical longitude.

These new instruments were tried out on the voyage from Arkhangelsk to Saint Petersburg in 1753 Kratzenstein discovered that the Norwegian coast was placed 150 km too far east on contemporary maps. This can seem unlikely due to the lack of accuracy of the watches being used. Many years later in 1793 Kratzenstein received a prize from the academy in Saint Petersburg for these observations and other magnetic measurements made on the same voyage.

=== Mathematical Calculation ===
In April 1765 at Saint Petersburg, Kratzenstein presented to the Russian Academy of Sciences a perfected version of the stepped reckoner arithmetical machine originally invented by Gottfried Leibniz. Kratzenstein claimed that his machine solved the problem the Leibniz machine had with calculations above four digits, perfecting the flaw where the machine is "prone to err whenever it is necessary to make a number of 9999 move to 10000", but the machine was not developed further.

=== Transits of Venus ===
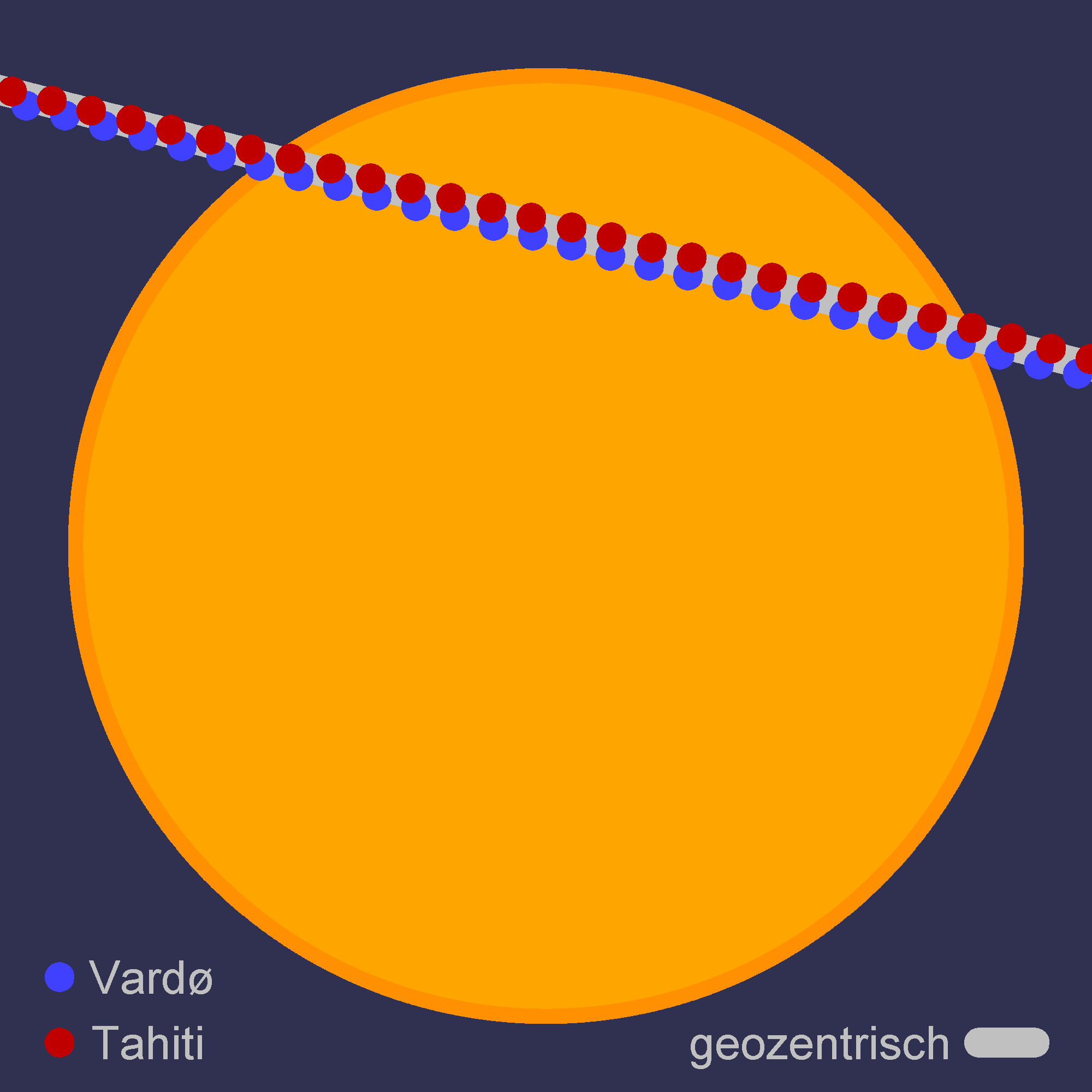
Transit of Venus 1769 seen from Tahiti and Vardø.

After the first observed transit of Venus in 1619, Edmund Halley had stressed the importance of the two upcoming transits in 1761 and 1769. Also in the Nordic countries there was great interest in taking part in these observations. In Copenhagen it was the astronomers in the local observatory Rundetårn who formally were responsible for such activities. But in practice it was Kratzenstein who became the leader of this endeavour. In public lectures before the transit in 1761 he presented the theoretical background for this rare phenomenon and calculated transit times together with suggestions for suitable places of observation.

For the first transit he thus knew that it would be important to make the measurements further north. He thus organized an expedition to Trondheim consisting of two students. One of them was Thomas Bugge, who was then 20 years old and later would become an astronomer and important land surveyor in Denmark. The other student was Urban Bruun Aaskow, who was even younger and studied medicine. Because of bad weather their observations in Trondheim were of little use. In Copenhagen the weather conditions were much better, but there the observations in Rundetårn failed due to inaccurate clocks.

The next transit in the summer of 1769 would take place during the night in the continental Europe and could thus not so easily be observed. But north of the polar circle there would be midnight sun and thus ideal for observations. The united kingdom Denmark-Norway could therefore make important contributions to this transit. Thus by a royal decree from Christian VII an expedition to the northernmost military post in Vardø was established. But in this process Kratzenstein was sidelined in favour of the Hungarian astronomer Maximilian Hell. The expedition was successful and the observations turned out to be of great value.

A disappointed Kratzenstein had in the meantime organized a private expedition to Trondheim. On the way there it suffered a shipwreck where Kratzenstein saved himself by swimming ashore. He reached Tronheim barely in time but bad weather made meaningful observations impossible.

=== Speech synthesis ===
The physical understanding of sound waves was established around 1750 by Leonhard Euler and others. From 1766 Euler was again back at the science academy in Saint Petersburg. In a letter from 1773 he asked the question how speech could arise from the flow of air through the vocal folds and tract. An unanswered question was related to what tonal qualities characterised the different letters when spoken. Euler speculated that it should perhaps be possible to build some kind of musical instrument which could produce similar sounds and string them together to understandable words. One possibility was to build on the existing vox humana which could be found in some pipe organs. The result would then be a mechanical speech synthesizer. He pointed also out that the vowels would be of special importance.

Kratzenstein had followed this discussion since he remained in contact with Euler and already from 1770 had been investigating the same problems. From his textbooks in experimental physics it is clear that he had a good understanding of the physics behind sound. It was therefore not so surprising that the academy in Saint Petersburg in 1778 announced a new prize problem exactly around these questions. The first part should investigate the tonal differences between the five vowels A, E, I, O and U, while the latter part asked for a device which could generate these sounds.

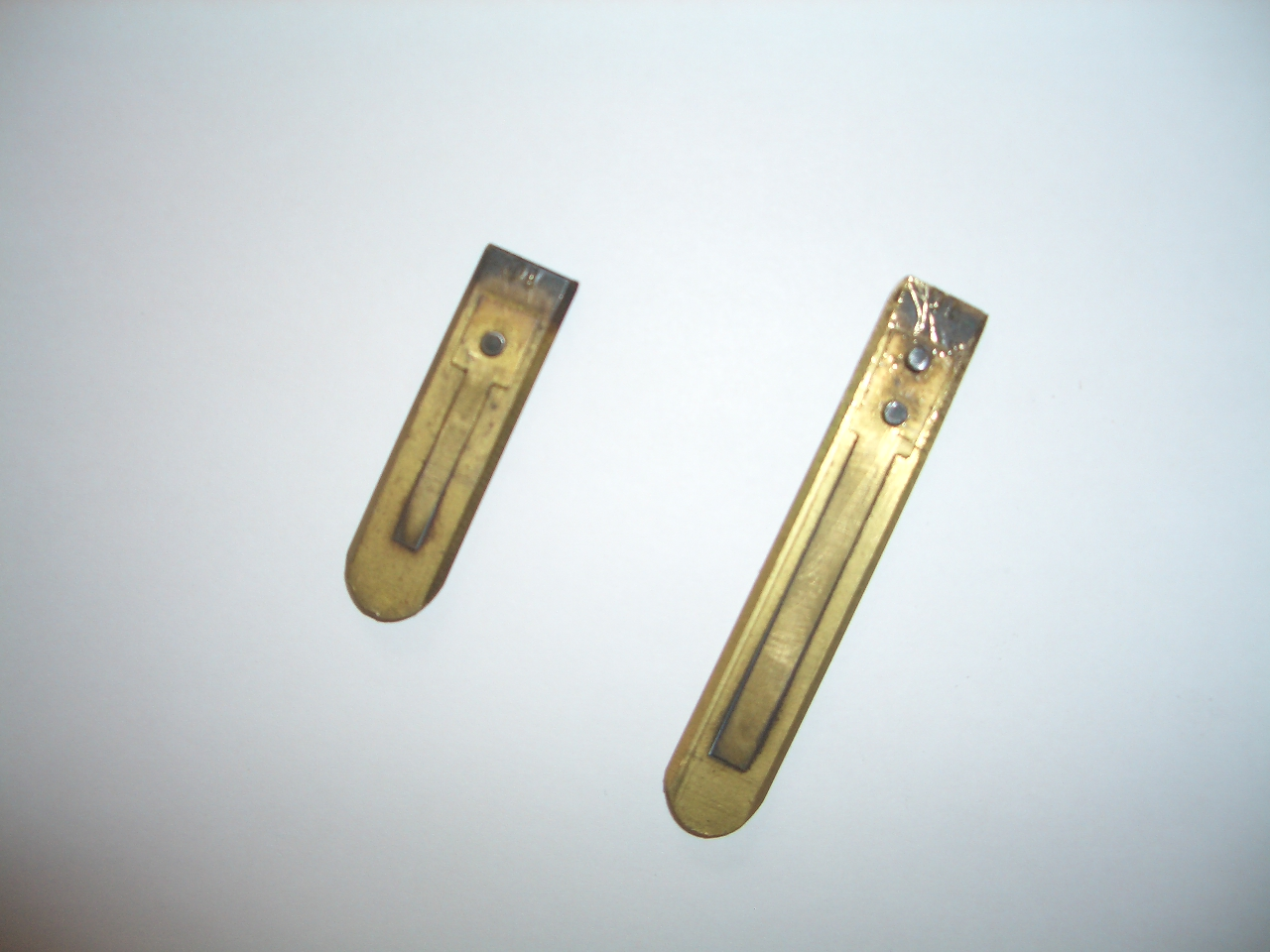
Two free reeds used in a harmonium.

At the final evaluation by the academy in 1780, it was Kratzenstein's "vowel organ" that got the first prize. His contribution Tentamen resolvendi problema was published the year after. It consisted of a first part describing how the vowels could be produced in the vocal tract. His medical background was here of great help. The second part was the construction of a new kind of organ with pipes for each of the vowels. Each pipe had a characteristic resonant cavity which should emulate the vocal tract for the corresponding vowel. In order to excite these resonators he made use of free reeds which at that time were little known.

This instrument was demonstrated in Saint Petersburg to the full satisfaction of the academy, but was damaged and disappeared shortly afterwards. But the use of free reeds in musical instruments became later widespread and can today be found in the harmonica, accordion, harmonium and bandoneon. It is not known how Kratzenstein got the idea to use them, but they had for a long time been a central part of the Chinese musical instrument sheng.

Academic offices
Preceded by Bernhard Møllmann	Rector of University of Copenhagen; 1865–1866	Succeeded by Johan Andreas Cramer
Preceded by Johan Christian Kall	Rector of University of Copenhagen; 1771–1772	Succeeded by Martin Hübner
Preceded by Claus Frees Hornemann	Rector of University of Copenhagen; 1779–1780	Succeeded by Johan Heinrich Schlegel
Preceded by Hector Frederik Janson	Rector of University of Copenhagen; 1785–1786	Succeeded by Børge Riisbrigh
