= Stephanius =

Danish historian (1599–1650)

Stephan Hansen Stephanius (July 23, 1599 – April 22, 1650) was a Danish historian and philologist. His name is sometimes fully Latinized as "Stephanus Johannis Stephanius"

== Biography ==
He was born in Copenhagen, Denmark-Norway. He attended Sorø Academy where his father Hans Stephensen (1561-1625) was a professor and superintendent. He later transferred to Herlufsholm School. He studied at the University of Copenhagen where in 1618 he took the Philosophical Baccalaureus. He subsequently studied at the University of Rostock and University of Leiden. After returning he became rector of Slangerup in 1625 and received his Master's Degree at the University of Copenhagen. In 1639, he became a professor at Sorø Academy and was appointed Royal historiographer.

He published a Latin edition of Svenonis Aggonis filii, qvæ extant, opuscula in 1642. Gesta Danorum was published in 1645 titled Saxonis Grammatici Historiæ Danicæ Libri XVI. His notes on the Greek lexicon of Hesychius are included in the edition of that work by Joannes Alberti (Lugd. Bat. 1746); see the Praefatio p. XXXIV. His book collection is now incorporated into the National Library of Sweden in Stockholm.
