= Jesper Henriksen =

Danish noble (c. 1425 – before 1493)

Jesper Henriksen (in some sources Jesper Henrichsen) (c. 1425 - before 1493) belonged to the Danish nobility. The son of Henrik Nielsen of Sandagergård, a member of The Council of the Realm during the reign of Erik of Pomerania, Henriksen held among other the position as dean of the Cathedral chapter in Copenhagen. Christian I of Denmark appointed him Rector magnificus, the first rector of the University of Copenhagen in 1479, a position he held again from 1482 to 1483.
