= Arnold Johan Messenius =

Swedish historian

Arnold Johan Messenius (1607 – 22 December 1651) was a Swedish enfant terrible and royal historiographer who was condemned to death and executed under the reign of Queen Christina.

== Early life ==
Arnold was born at Danzig (modern-day Gdańsk), the son of the historian Johannes Messenius and Lucia Grothusen, daughter of Arnold Grothusen. The Grothusens were members of the old Livonian nobility. Arnold Johan spent much of his youth in the fortress of Kajaneborg in Finland, where his father had been imprisoned on suspicion of being a Catholic and collaborating with the king of Poland Sigismund III Vasa and the Jesuits.

His father was sentenced to death in July 1616, but the king changed the sentence to life imprisonment in Kajenborg Castle, Finland. During his imprisonment, Johannes Messenius wrote the Scandia illustrata, a history of the Nordic countries in 14 volumes. The work treated Sweden's history from the Genesis flood narrative to Messenius' own time. When Messenius suspected that the government wanted to publish this work in its own name, he demanded freedom for his son, Arnold, who was also imprisoned, and free passage for himself to wherever he wished. Shortly after Johannes Messenius died, the government offered his widow, Lucia Grothusen, 500 Swedish riksdaler for Scandia illustrata. However, she left the kingdom with the manuscripts.

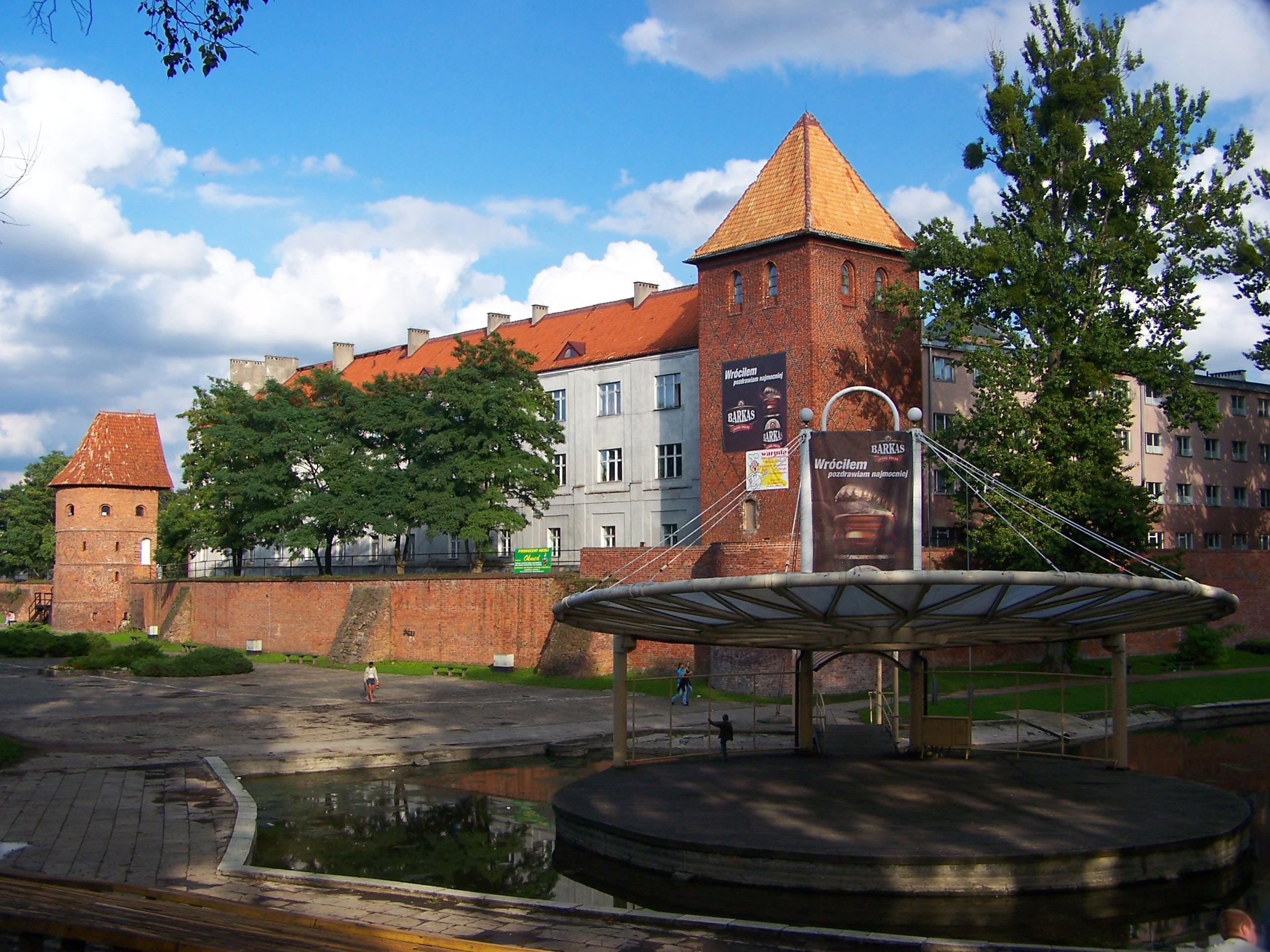
Buildings of the Collegium Hosianum

Arnold had a restless adolescence. In 1621, at the age of 14, the Swedish government dispatched him to Uppsala in a boarding school to avoid any Jesuit "contamination" from his father and receive a Lutheran education. He was forced to flee in 1622 after being accused of killing a classmate during a dispute.

After an adventurous escape through Norway and Denmark, he arrived in Danzig, Royal Prussia, Poland, where he was welcomed by his mother's family. In October 1623 he was accepted at the prestigious Jesuit Collegium Hosianum in Braunsberg (Poland), where his father also had studied, but, undisciplined, he left shortly afterwards. After wandering in Prussia, Poland, Silesia, Bohemia and Austria, he returned to Sweden in July 1624 in the wake of Krzysztof Radziwiłł, a noble Lithuanian Protestant and opponent of Gustav II Adolf of Sweden.

== 1624 Trial ==
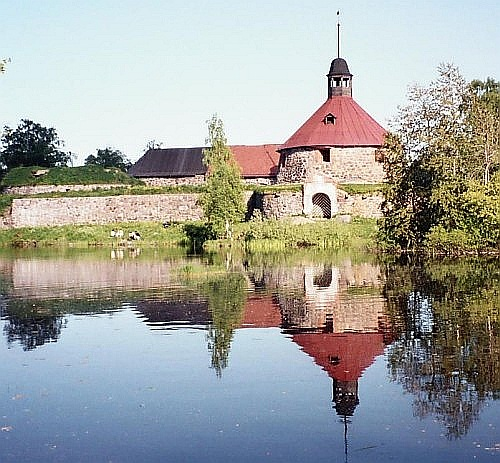
Korela Fortress is the main landmark of Kexholm

In Sweden, at the age of ~ 17 years old on 17 July 1624, Arnold was questioned by King Gustav II Adolf and his trial began before the Svea hovrätt. He was accused of abusing his royal stipend while studying at Uppsala University, using a false passport to flee the country, and that he was a spy for the Catholic Poland and intended to provide their King with information that would endanger Sweden. As the trial progressed Arnold claimed his father Johannes was Jesuit (Catholic) who had planned to settle in Poland.

On 31 July, Arnold was found guilty of all charges and sentenced to death. However, after appealing for clemency he was pardoned by King Gustav II Adolf and sentenced to imprisonment for an "indefinite period of time." In 1626 sent to Kexholm as a prisoner.

== Career ==
He was pardoned 14 years later, in 1640 through Count Per Brahe, the governor of Swedish Finland. He then went to Stockholm to obtain employment in government service.

In the summer of 1640, Messenius tried to flee the country, afraid of being put back in prison. He was caught and arrested at the Danish border in August 1640 and was put back in prison in Stockholm. He was yet again pardoned by Per Brahe and was instructed to go to Poland and find the manuscript Scandia illustrata, left there by his mother after his father's death. Messenius was able to fulfill this mission, and returned to Sweden in the summer of 1641. He was then instructed to write an official history of Sigismund and Charles IX's reign and won the generous patronage of the admiral Carl Carlsson Gyllenhielm.

In 1645 he was appointed royal historian by Queen Christina, and raised to the peerage. However, he had not the talent of his father for history, nor his critical instinct, nor the qualities of perseverance and willingness to do hard work. Woodhead summarises his character after this promotion as, "he was harsh to his inferiors, insolent to his equals, and ungrateful to his benefactress." When Christina ordered him, after a scandal, to supply his sister with some of his fiefs, their animosity began.

Subsequently, in 1649 and 1650 he made connections with opposition leaders known as the "Messenius conspiracy", and Swedish noblemen were alarmed.

== Death ==
Messenius' son (also called Arnold) wrote some satires on Axel Oxenstierna and accused Christina of serious misbehavior and being a Jezebel. The pamphlet also called for her cousin and heir Carl Gustav to organise a coup and kill her and her government. Alongside other claims that she was wasting money on dances and her other hobbies, and also made accusations that Ebba Brahe planned to poison Carl, and that Christina was being manipulated by Axel Oxenstierna and Magnus de la Gardie.

For this which Arnold Johan Messenius was beheaded in Stockholm, together with his 22-year-old son on December 22 1651.

During the interrogations the Messenii accused multiple prominent politicians of being involved in the "conspiracy", including: Bengt Skytte, Nils Nilsson, Christopher of Fors, Johannes Elai Terserus, and Nils Skunk. All of these individuals were outspoken members of de ofrälse (the Clergy, the Burghers, and the Peasants) in the 1650 Riksdag, who stood in opposition to the Nobility. However, the courts found no substantial evidence to execute or punish these named men.
