= Jon Jakobsen Venusinus =

Danish theologian, naturalist and historian

Jon Jakobsen Venusinus (c. 1558 – 20 January 1608) was a Danish theologian, naturalist and historian.

== Early life and education ==
He was born on the island of Ven as the son of the local pastor, Jakob Jonsen. His father was transferred to Landskrona in 1563, where Jon Jakobsen assumed the surname Coronensis, which he changed to Venusinus after the island of Ven became widely known due to the observatories built there by Tycho Brahe. He visited the school at Frederiksborg, and later studied in Copenhagen and Rostock.

In 1579 David Chytræus recommended him to Frederick II, who granted him an annuity to support his studies. Venusinus spent some years travelling in Europe, visiting Germany, Austria, Switzerland and Italy, and completed a master's degree in Wittenberg.

== Career ==
Returning to Denmark, he was made parish priest in Herfølge and Sædder and dean of Bjæverskov Herred in 1584, a position in which he was succeeded by Claus Christoffersen Lyschander in 1587.

The position in Herfølge was one of the most lucrative in the country, but Venusinus appears to have preferred life in the capital, and he moved to Copenhagen in 1587 where he was made pastor of the Church of the Holy Ghost. He was accused of holding Crypto-Calvinist sympathies, due to his refusal to perform baptismal exorcism, and he was suspended from office in 1588. He petitioned Christian IV to abolish baptismal exorcism; his request was not granted, but in a partial success for Venusinus, the king himself had one of his children baptized without the ceremony.

Although Venusinus was not on good terms with the Copenhagen academy, he was appointed professor of physics (i.e. natural sciences) "by royal command" in 1600, under which title he undertook the construction of a botanical garden.

He was among the first at Copenhagen University to accept the Copernican worldview and he held lectures on magnetism. After the death of Niels Krag in 1602, he was also appointed Royal Historian. In 1603 he switched from the chair of physics to that of rhetoric and held lectures on Danish antiquity (Antiquitates rerum Danicarum). In 1606 he accompanied Christian IV to England on the king's visit to his brother-in-law James I of England, where his erudition attracted considerable attention.

In 1607, Venusinus was endowed with Soro Abbey, which allowed him to retire from all paid academic work, and he intended to focus on compiling a history of Denmark, but he died, around the age of fifty, on 30 January of the following year.

== Personal life ==
Venusinus married Agathe, the daughter of professor John Sascerides in 1585, and after the death of his first wife in 1589 he married Karine Dankertsdatter, widow of canon Hans Leiel in Roskilde. It appears that both marriages remained childless, but he adopted the son of his second wife, Dankert Leiel.
