= Johannes Meursius =

Dutch scholar (1579–1639)

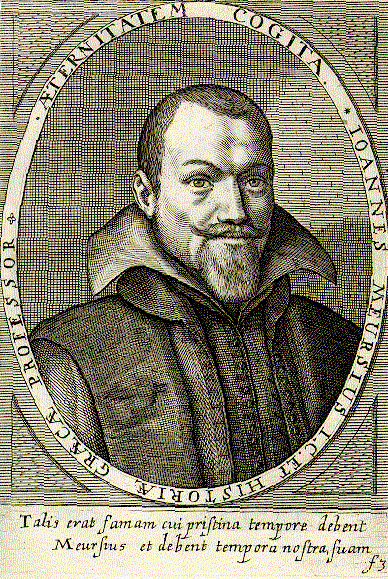
Johannes Meursius

Johannes Meursius (van Meurs) (9 February 1579 – 20 September 1639) was a Dutch classical scholar and antiquary.

== Biography ==
Meursius was born Johannes van Meurs at Loosduinen, near The Hague. He was extremely precocious, and at the age of sixteen produced a commentary on the Cassandra of Lycophron. For ten years he was the tutor to the children of Johan van Oldenbarnevelt, accompanying the family on Oldenbarnevelt's diplomatic missions to many of the courts of Europe. While on such a trip, in 1608 he obtained a doctorate of Law in Orléans. In 1610 he was appointed professor of Greek and history at Leiden, and in the following year historiographer to the States-General of the Netherlands. After Oldenbarnevelt's execution in 1619, though he had attempted to remain neutral in religious affairs, Meursius was seen as leaning toward Arminianism, or Remonstrant beliefs by reason of his service to the Oldenbarnevelt children, and his position at Leiden was challenged. In consequence of this he welcomed the offer (1625) of Christian IV of Denmark to become professor of history and politics at Soro, in Zealand, combined with the office of historiographer royal, in which role he produced a Latin history of Denmark (1630–38), Historia Danica. He died in Sorø and is buried in Sorø Abbey Church.

Meursius was the author of classical editions and treatises, many of which are printed in J.F. Gronovius's Thesaurus antiquitatum graecarum. Their lack of arrangement detracts from their value, but they are a storehouse of information, and Meursius does not deserve the epithets of "pedant" and "ignoramus" which Joseph Justus Scaliger applied to him. Meursius also wrote about the troubles in the Netherlands.

Meursius also authored the Glossarium graeco-barbarum, one of the first dictionaries of Modern Greek.

Complete edition of his works by J. Lami (1741–1763). See Van der Aa's Biographisch Woordenboek der Nederlanden (1869), and J.E. Sandys, History of Classical Scholarship (1908), ii. 311.

== Selected works ==
- 1612: Res Belgicae, Lugduni Batavorum
- 1614: Glossarium graecobarbarum, Lugduni Batavorum
- 1617: Lectiones Atticae, Lugduni Batavorum
- 1619: Eleusinia, siue, De Cereris Eleusinae sacro, ac festo: Liber Singularis, Lugduni Batavorum
- 1625: Athenae Batavae, Lugduni Batavorum
- 1630: Historia Danica, Hafniae
- 1684: Theseus; sive de ejus vita rebusque gestis liber postumus. Accedunt ejusdem Paralipomena de pagis Atticis, et excerpta ex ... Jacobi Sponii Itinerario de iisdem pagis. Ultrajecti: apud Franciscum Halma (On J. F. Gronovius's Thesaurus antiquitatum graecarum)
