= Frederik Torm =

Danish theologian

Frederik Emanuel Torm (24 August 1870 – 3 November 1953) was a Danish theologian.

He was born in Tschifu, China as a son of ship-owner Ditlev Torm (1836–1907) and Elise H. M. Zoëga (1846–1918). His father was a shipmaster in East Aia until the early 1870s. In July 1904 in Copenhagen he married teacher Elisif Thaulow (1877–1958).

After finishing his secondary education in 1888 he took the cand.theol. degree in 1894, and conducted further studies in Europe until 1897. In 1901 he took the lic.theol. degree and became professor at the University of Copenhagen in 1903. He published on the New Testament and subscribed to conservative theology. He was the rector of the University of Copenhagen from 1924 to 1925.

Torm opposed the contents of the 1920 publication Jødefaren, known as the Danish edition of The Protocols of the Elders of Zion. Torm's writings on the subject spread to Norway as well. In the 1930s he continued as an active writer against Antisemitism, publishing Jødefolket og Verdenshistorien in late 1939, as well as Kirkekampen i Tyskland 1933–39 about the relations between church and state in Nazi Germany. Torm also edited the journal Teologisk Tidsskrift from 1899 to 1937. He was decorated as a Knight of the Order of Dannebrog in 1920, eventually being upgraded to Commander, First Class in 1940, and also received Dannebrogordenens Hæderstegn in 1925.

Academic offices
Preceded by Hans Munch-Petersen	Rector of the University of Copenhagen; 1924–1925	Succeeded by Johannes Fibiger
