= Johann Freinsheim =

German classical scholar and critic (1608–1660)

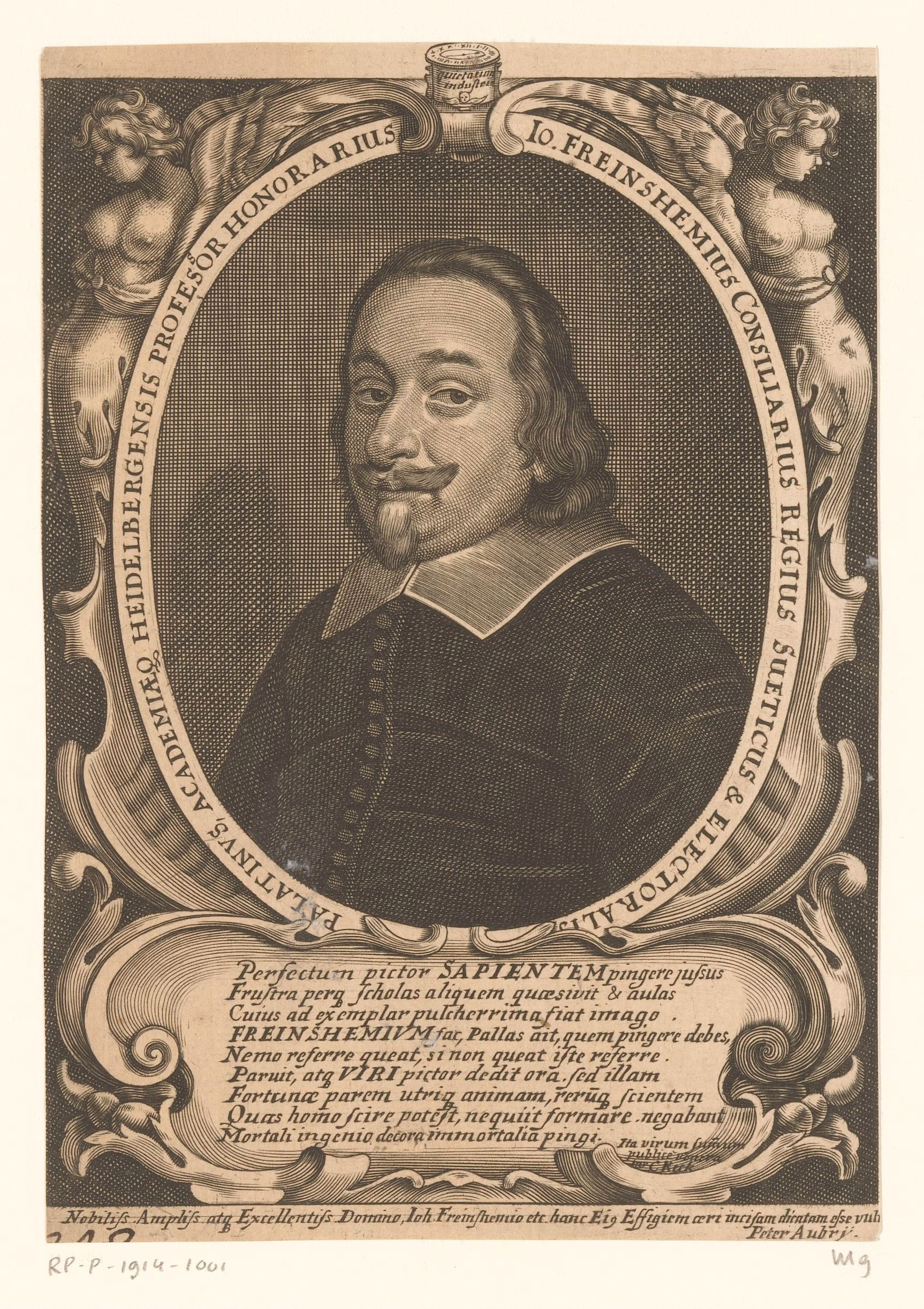
Johann Freinsheim

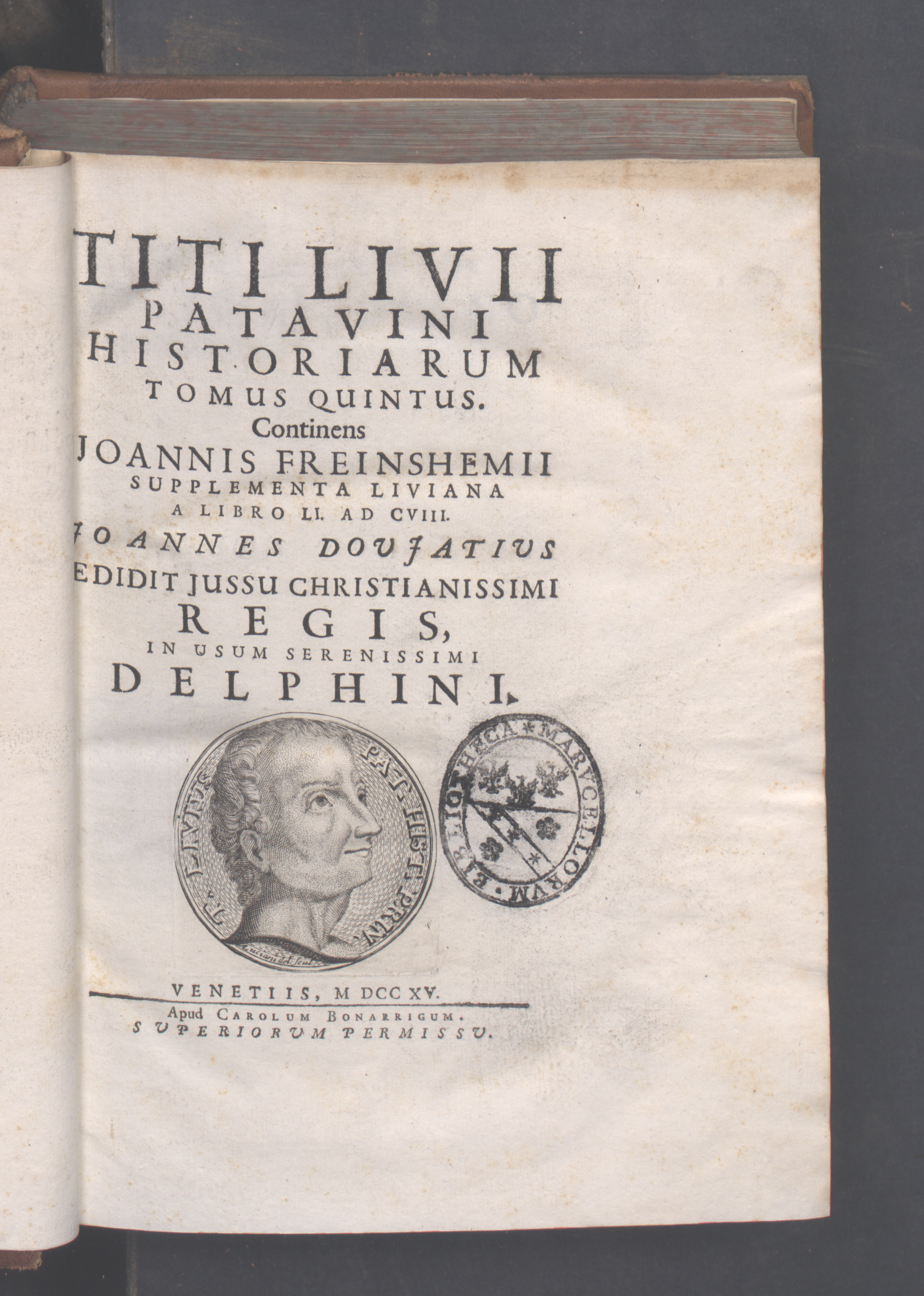
Supplementa liviana (1715)

Johann Freinsheim (November 16, 1608 – August 31, 1660), also known under the Latinized form of the name, Johannes Frenshemius, was a German classical scholar and critic.

Freinsheim was born at Ulm on November 16, 1608, and after studying at several universities: Marburg, Giessen and Strassburg, he visited France, where he remained for three years.

Freinsheim returned to Strassburg in 1637, and in 1642 was appointed professor of eloquence and holder of the Skyttean chair at the University of Uppsala. In 1647, he was summoned by Queen Christina to Stockholm to serve as court librarian and royal historiographer. In 1650, he resumed his professorship at Uppsala, but early in the following year he was obliged to resign on account of ill-health. In 1656, he became honorary professor at Heidelberg, and died on August 31, 1660.

Freinsheim's literary activity was chiefly devoted to the Roman historians. He first introduced the division into chapters and paragraphs, and by means of carefully compiled indexes illustrated the lexical peculiarities of each author. He is best known for his famous supplements to Quintus Curtius and Livy, containing the missing books written by himself.

== Editions ==
- Gutt, Niklas, ed. (2023). Johannes Freinsheims Supplemente zur zweiten Dekade des Livius (1649). Bd. 1: Untersuchung. Trier: WVT Wissenschaftlicher Verlag Trier. ISBN 9783868219982.
