= Johannes Loccenius =

German-Swedish historian (1598-1677)

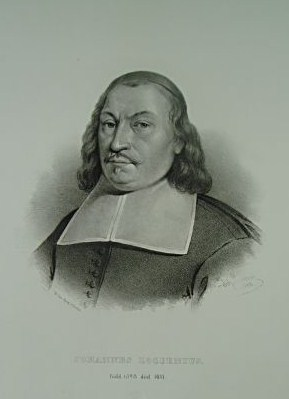
- 1842 lithograph
- Born: 13 March 1598; Itzehoe, Holstein
- Died: 27 July 1677 (aged 79)
- Title: Rikshistoriograf

Academic work
- Discipline: Jurist, Historian

Johannes Loccenius (Johan Locken) (13 March 1598 – 27 July 1677) was a German jurist and historian, known as an academic in Sweden.

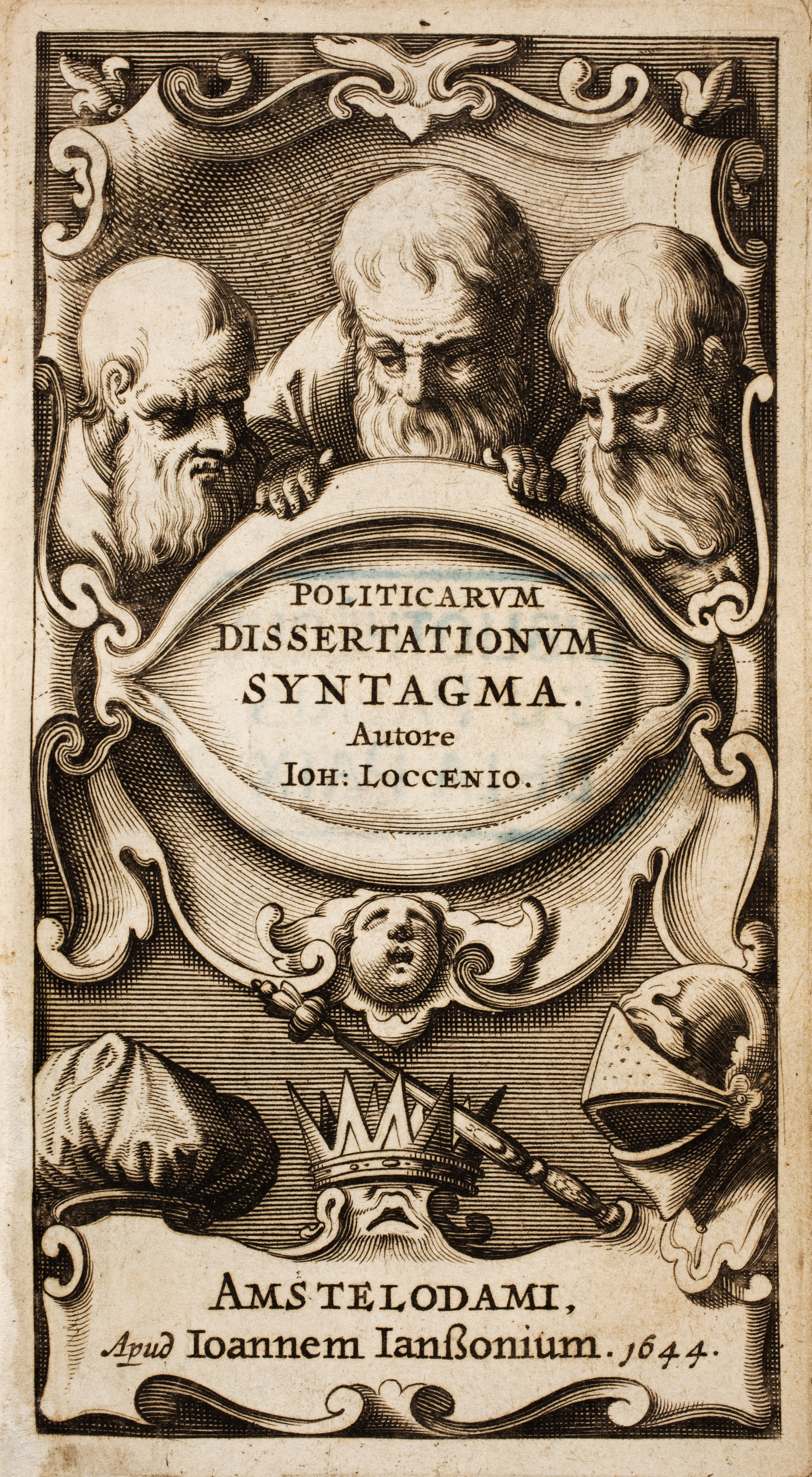
Frontispice of his book Politicarum dissertationum syntagma, 1608

== Life ==
He was born at Itzehoe, Holstein, the son of a tradesman, and educated at the Gelehrtenschule des Johanneums. He went to study at Rostock and Helmstedt in 1616, and in 1617 was in Leiden. After a period at Hamburg, where he encountered in particular Holstenius, he returned to Leiden in 1624, where he received a doctorate in law.

Loccenius was recruited by Johan Skytte for Gustavus Adolphus, and went to Sweden. From 1628 to 1642 he taught a humanist and political syllabus as professor skytteanus; from 1634 he also taught Roman law. As librarian also at the University of Uppsala, he received the embassy of Bulstrode Whitelocke, and they discussed English jurists including Francis Bacon and John Selden.

== Works ==
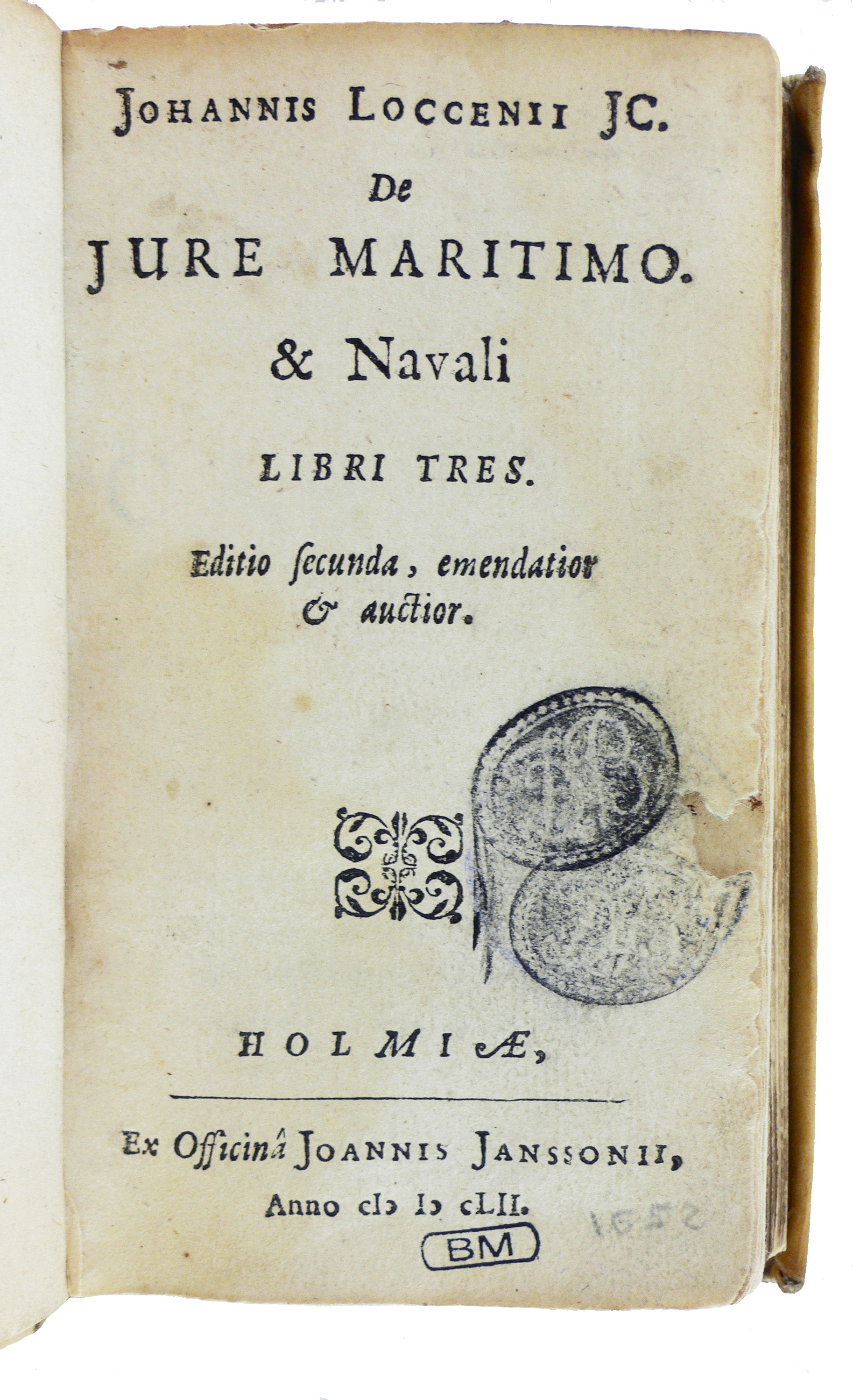
De jure maritimo et navali, 1652.

The De jure maritimo was a commentary on Swedish maritime law as published in the Legisterium Sueciæ. As De jure maritimo et navali it went through a number of editions. The maritime law work of Loccenius was later republished, with works by Franz Stypmann and Reinhold Kuricke, by Johann Gottlieb Heineccius. Loccenius wrote in particular on piracy. He was an early author on legal concepts of territorial waters, whose views were quoted long afterwards.

As legal antiquarian Loccenius published an edition of the corpus of Swedish provincial law, the Lex Sueo-Gothorum. His Synopsis juris ad leges Sueticas accommodata (1648) was an early example of the 17th-century use of the Decalogue to classify capital crimes. The Lexicon juris Svevo-Gothicae (1651) was a largely linguistic work.

Loccenius was given the title Rikshistoriograf in 1651. In the 1650s he moved from the study of Swedish medieval law to writing on the general history of Sweden. He initially minimised the pre-Christian period, and he followed Ericus Olai in arguing that foreign kings were responsible for negative aspects of the history. He published:

- Three volumes on Swedish history (1647)
- Rerum Suecicarum Historia (1654)
- Erici Olai Historia Sueicorum Gothorumque (1654)
- Antiquitates Sveo-Gothicae (1670)
- Antiquitatum Sueo-Gothicarum
