= Dampskibsselskabet Torm =

Danish shipping company

TORM

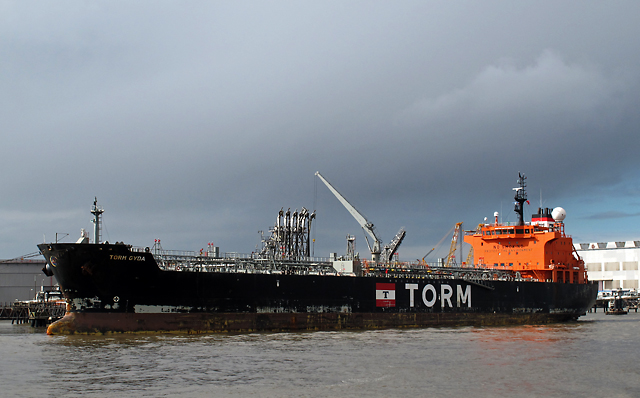
- Finnish-Swedish ice class 1A MV Torm Gyda
- Type: Public (Nasdaq Copenhagen: TORM,Nasdaq: TRMD)
- Industry: Shipping
- Founded: 1889
- Founder: Ditlev Torm
- Headquarters: Copenhagen, Denmark
- Key people: Jacob Meldgaard CEO,
- Products: Tankers
- Revenue: 819 million USD (2007)
- Operating income: 205 million USD (2007)
- Net income: 792 million USD (2007)
- Subsidiaries: OMI Corporation (With Teekay Corporation)
- Website: http://www.torm.com/

TORM based in Copenhagen, Denmark, is a shipping company that owns and operates product tankers. The company's product tankers carry refined oil products such as gasoline, jet fuel, naphtha and diesel oil.

== History ==
Torm was founded by Ditlev Torm and Christian Schmiegelow in 1889. The company was listed on the Copenhagen Stock Exchange in 1905. Today, TORM is listed on Nasdaq Copenhagen and NASDAQ in New York.

== Operations ==
The company was formerly composed of tanker and bulk carrier divisions with product tanker activity accounting for the majority of the business. The last two bulk carriers were divested in 2015.

TORM is one of the leading tanker carriers of clean oil products such as gasoline, jet fuel, naphtha and diesel oil and other clean products.

The company operates approximately 80 vessels.

On 8 June 2007, A/S Dampskibsselskabet TORM (TORM) announced that TORM and Teekay Corporation had completed the acquisition of the OMI Corporation (OMI), whereby OMI became a jointly owned subsidiary of TORM and Teekay. TORM will consequently with effect from 1 August 2007 take over 24 product tankers from OMI, leaving TORM's fleet at 85 vessels excluding new builds. TORM will also take over OMI's technical operations in India and a part of OMI's organisation in the US.

In December 2025, it was announced BW Group subsidiary, Hafnia Limited had completed the purchase of approximately 13.97 per cent of TORM’s issued share capital from Oaktree Capital Management for US$311.43 million. Following completion of the transaction, Hafnia held 14,156,061 A-shares in TORM, while Oaktree retained a reduced holding.
