= Christian Schmiegelow =

Danish businessman

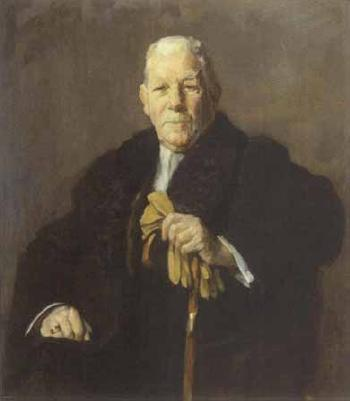
- Schmiegelow painted by Herman Vedel in 1939
- Born: 4 September 1859; Rønne, Denmark
- Died: 12 November 1949 (aged 90); Copenhagen, Denmark
- Occupation: Businessman
- Awards: Commander of the Order of the Dannebrog

Christian Frederik Joachim Schmiegelow (4 September 1859 - 12 November 1949) was a Danish businessman. A co-founder of Dampskibsselskabet Torm, he later worked for the East Asiatic Company where he was part of the management from 1909 to 1935.

== Early life and education ==
Schmiegelow was born in Rønne on the island of Bornholm, the son of pharmacist Fritz Adolph Schmiegelow (1819–62) and Johanne Barbara Arboe (1827–66). His father died of typhoid fever in 1862 and his mother died of tuberculosis in 1866. Schmiegelow then grew up in the household of a paternal uncle, Ernst Schmiegelow, who was a master painter in Copenhagen. The family lived at Sankt Peders Stræde 27. Schmiegelow attended Borgerdyd School in Christianshavn.

He went to sea at the age of 15, acquired solid practical experience as a seaman on ships under different flags. He almost died from typhoid fever on a voyage to New York City. He was educated as a navigator at the Navigation School in Copenhagen in 1880–81..

== Career ==
When Ditlev Torm founded Dampskibsselskabet Torm in 1889, it was with Schmiegelow as captain of its first steam vessel. In 1898, he accepted an offer from Hans Niels Andersen to join the East Asiatic Company. He continued in Torm as a board member and from 1898 as chairman of the board.

In his work for the East Asiatic Company, during the Boxer Rebellion, together with captain Christian Cold, Schmiegelow was responsible for organizing transportation of troops to East Asia from South Russian ports. He was a member of the company's board of directors from 1909 to1935. He played a central role in expanding the company's fleet and the transition from steam vessels to modern ships. He was also active as a board member in a number of associated companies, including Dampskibsselskabet Orient, soyakagefabrikken and Det Østasiatiske Industri- og Plantagekompagni. He became a board member of the parent company in 1927 and remained a member of it until his death. He was a board member of the Free Port of Copenhagen from 1912 to 1942.

== Personal life ==
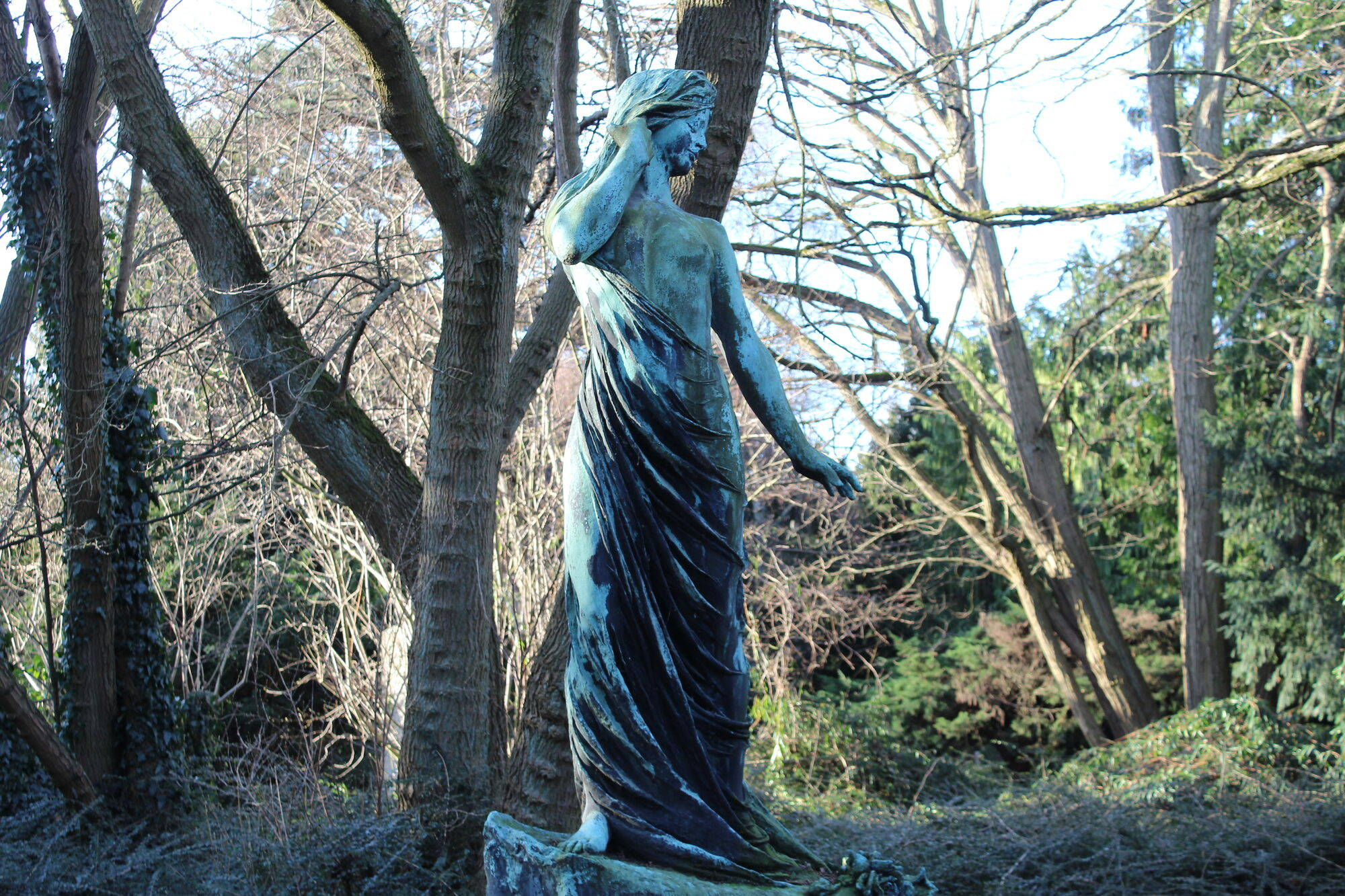
Christian and Thyra Schmiegelow's grave at Assistens Cemetery in Copenhagen.

Schmiegelow married Thyra Ingeborg Viola Meyer (18 March 1870 - 12 October 1905), a daughter of Johan Philip Ferdinand Meyer (1828–87) and actress Anna Marie Benedictsen (1835–74), on 25 August 1893 in Copenhagen. They had four children, one daughter and three sons, prior to her early death just 35 years old in 1905. He commissioned the scylptor Rudolph Tegner to create a sculpture of a woman for her grave at Assistens Cemetery in Copenhagen. Schmiegelow was later married to her sister, Olga Harriet Meyer (7 August 1863 - 6 April 1944), an actress, on 24 May 1911.

Schmiegelow shared his time between an apartment at Stavangergade 6 in Copenhagen and the summer residence Villa Skrænten on Sofievej in Vedbæk. He died on 12 November 1949 in Copenhagen. He is buried in Assistens Cemetery.
