= Niels Krag =

Danish academic and diplomat

Niels Krag (1550 – 14 May 1602), was a Danish academic and diplomat. Krag was a Doctor of Divinity, Professor at the University of Copenhagen, and historiographer Royal.

== Mission to Scotland ==
In August 1589 the Danish council decided that Peder Munk, Breide Rantzau, Dr Paul Knibbe, and Niels Krag would accompany Anne of Denmark, the bride of James VI, to Scotland. After several mishaps, poor weather, and "contrary winds" they decided to stay at Oslo over the winter.

In May 1593 Krag travelled to Scotland with Steen Bille. Anne of Denmark came aboard their ship at Leith on 31 May, with her ladies in waiting, including the two sisters Marie Stewart, Countess of Mar and Henrietta Stewart, Countess of Huntly. She gave the sailors a gift of 100 gold crowns.

Their mission was primarily to accept the lands of Dunfermline Abbey given to Anne as a "morning gift" by her husband, James VI of Scotland, recently re-confirmed in the Parliament of Scotland. They negotiated with John Maitland of Thirlestane who had held some of the lands. Krag and Bille visited the dowry lands as Peder Munk had done in 1590.

In Edinburgh, they were lodged in the Canongate at John Kinloch's house close to Holyrood Palace. The last week in July was occupied by the aftermath of an attack on Holyrood by the Earl of Bothwell. Krag recorded the events in a Latin journal of their embassy and in a separate memorandum. James VI had to explain the circumstances of Bothwell's appearance at Holyrood to them in a meeting with the Privy Council in the Tolbooth.

They left the Scottish court on 6 August 1593, escorted to Leith by the queen and the royal councilors. Giacomo Castelvetro, an Italian author presented Krag with a manuscript of Italian proverbs and their explanations, with a personal dedication to "Nicolò Crachio", bound in vellum with gold tooling. James VI gave Krag a lengthy Latin letter of recommendation or testimonial with a grant of noble arms. A few weeks later a lion arrived in Edinburgh as a present from Christian IV with a German lion-keeper, Wilhelm Fröhlich. The lion, a gift to Christian from the King of Poland, was tame enough that it could led around by two boys.

== London in 1598 ==
In 1598 James Young, the son of the Scottish diplomat Peter Young stayed with Krag while his father and David Cunningham travelled to Rostock and Gustrow, seeking military support to put James VI on the throne of England, in the event of the death of Queen Elizabeth. Their instructions suggested that Elizabeth was in increasingly poor health.

Krag was sent to England as the ambassador of Christian IV of Denmark, and was given instructions concerning shipping, English pirates and the Iceland fisheries. In London his household included his followers, with Simon van Salingen, the Danish king's merchant, and Harman Rose, a Danish apothecary, and Peter van Heil, the king's agent in London and Proctor to the Duke of Brunswick. Krag hosted feasts for the Scottish ambassador, a German baron, Heinrich Langerman, Alderman of the Steelyard, and some academics, where a great abundance of wine was consumed.

He had his first audience with Elizabeth on 17 December 1598 at Whitehall Palace. Elizabeth had heard from her ambassadors, Christopher Perkins and Edward, Lord Zouche, that the Scottish envoys in Denmark and Germany had discussed her age and health, and she complained about these "lewd reports of our valetudinary state". Copies of the Scottish ambassadors' instructions make specific reference to the queen's failing health.

== The dancing queen ==
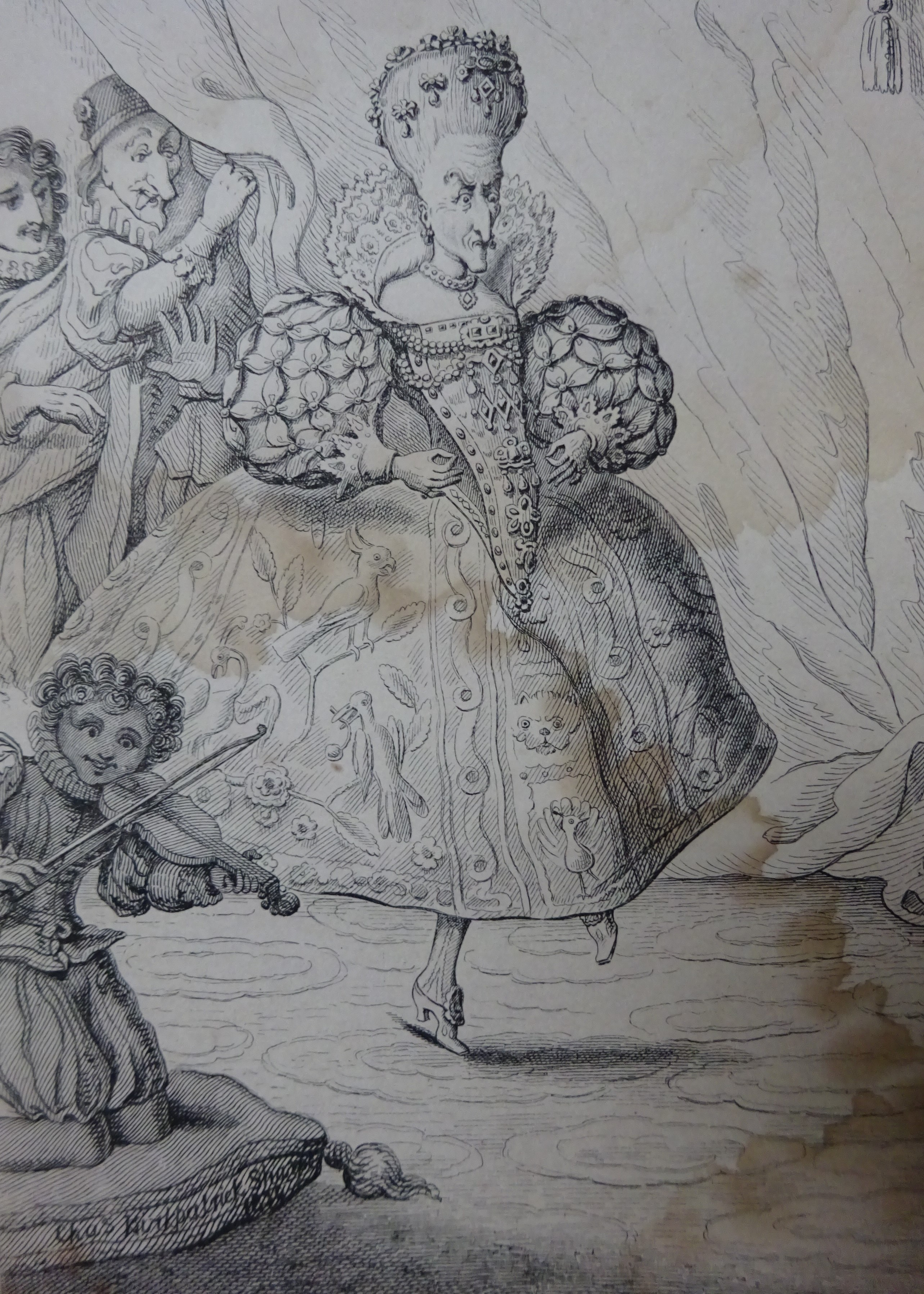
Elizabeth I dancing, observed by Roger Aston, after a drawing by Charles Kirkpatrick Sharpe.

On 6 January 1599 Krag saw Elizabeth dance with the Earl of Essex at Whitehall Palace. Krag noted in his journal, "she was invited by the earl of Essex to dance, first excusing herself to me with a joke: then, she danced in a high style following him." Elizabeth said to Krag, in reference to the activities of the Scottish ambassadors in Denmark and Germany who were canvassing for support for James VI in the event of her death;

"You might congratulate me because so many years have passed, though asked to renounce my kingdom, I am not yet so infirm, but can still dance like this, and do other things, despite my wasted body" she added, "Mark this; I would have you reprove the Scots envoys"

John Chamberlain heard that Elizabeth was "very richly and freshly attired" on this occasion, possibly meaning she wore a "tire", a ribboned head-dress. Surprisingly, the Earl of Essex was said to walk with a stoop, and that so far from being a good dancer, he was "no graceful goer".

This was not the only occasion when Elizabeth danced before a diplomat or envoy to make a point about her age and life expectancy. Godfrey Goodman mentions her dancing in private for Roger Aston whenever he delivered letters from Scotland. During the visit of Virginio Orsini, Duke of Bracciano, she danced a galliard to show the "vigour of her old age". Chamberlain also mentioned the "measures and galliards" the queen danced for Orsini in January 1601. The French diplomat André Hurault de Maisse, who came in November 1597, said she tapped her feet in time to the music while her ladies danced on 6 January 1598, and had learnt high dancing in the Italian manner. Her maids called her "the Florentine". De Maisse said her walking could be like "half dancing", but did not see her dance in person.

The Scottish diplomat James Sempill heard from Lord Hunsdon in September 1599 that Elizabeth insisted on riding rather than using a coach or litter, and had recently danced a Spanish "pavie to a whissil tabourier" at Hampton Court to demonstrate her continuing vitality.

== Later life and legacy ==
Jon Jakobsen Venusinus became Court Historian after the death of Niels Krag in 1602.

Krag's son, Iver Krag, was a student at St Andrews University in 1610 and 1611.
