= Bernhard Møllmann =

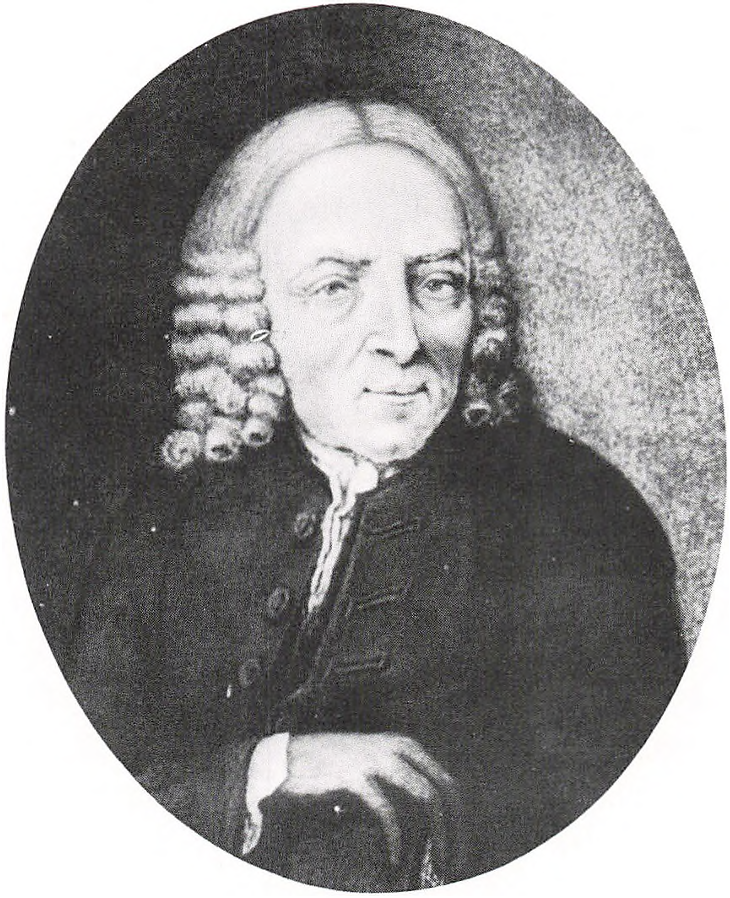
Miniature portrait painting of Møllmann at Gisselfeld

Bernhard Mølemann (12 September 1702 – 25 July 1778) was a Danish historian and librarian. He served as chief librarian of the Royal Danish Library from 1748, professor of history at the University of Copenhagen from 1754 and Historiographer Royal from 1755. He was rector of the University of Copenhagen in 1756–57 and again in 1764–65. There is an epitaph to Møllmann created by Johannes Wiedewelt in the burial chapel of St. Peter's Church in Copenhagen.

== Early life and education ==
Møllmann was born on 12 September 1702 in Flensburg as the son of merchant Carsten Møllmann and Gesine Paulsen. He received his first schooling in Flensburg before attending the grammar school in Lübeck. From 1721 to 1724 he studied at Wittenberg University. He also visited the universities in Halle, Jena and Leipzig. In 1725, he returned to his home town.

== Career ==
In 1731, Møllmann moved to Copenhagen. With assistance from Gans Gram, he was employed at the Royal Danish Library. He was responsible for creating a catalogue of the library's book collection as well as the Gottorp manuscripts (11 folio volumes). In 1734, he was back in Germany. In 1740, he unsuccessfully competed with Henrik Stampe and P. Kofod Ancher for the professorial chair in law at the University of Copenhagen. In 1731, he was instead appointed as professor of antiquitates patriæ. In 1732, he became a Doctor of Law. In October 1743, he was also made a member of the university's konsistorium (governing body).

In 1748, he succeeded Gram as chief librarian of the Royal Danish Library. In 1749, he was responsible for the transfer of 12,000 volumes from the library at Gottorp Castle to Copenhagen.

In 1754, he succeeded Ludvig Holberg as professor of history and geography. He served two terms as rector of the university, first in 1756–57 and then in 1764–65. On 31 May 1755, he was appointed as Historiographer Royal.

== Personal life ==
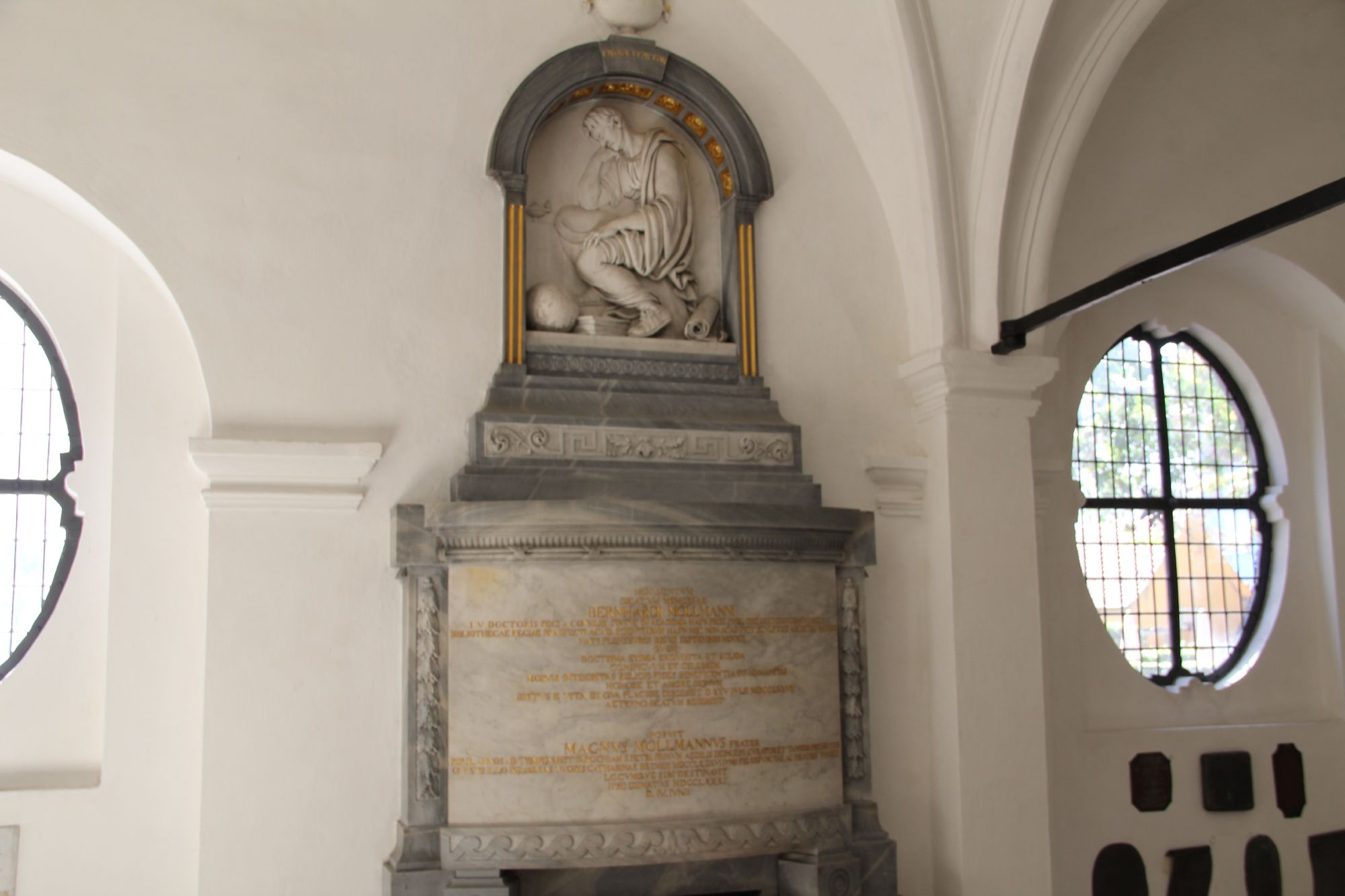
Epitaph to Bernhard Møllmann in the burial chapel of St. Peter's Church in Copenhagen

Møllmann did not marry. Towards the end of his life, he became almost blind. He died on 25 July 1778. He is buried in the burial chapel of St. Peter's Church. An epitaph to him designed by Johannes Wiedewelt was installed in the chapel in 1779.

== Memberships and awards ==
In 1743, Møllmann became a member of the Royal Danish Society of Science. In 1748, he was created an honorary member of the Royal Danish Academy of Fine Arts.

In 1755, he was awarded the title of justitsråd, or councillor of justice. In 1768, he was awarded the title of etatsråd.

Academic offices
| Preceded by Christen Lodberg Friis | Rector of University of Copenhagen; 1756–1757 | Succeeded by Hans Otto Bang |
| Preceded by Peder Rosenstand-Goiske | Rector of University of Copenhagen; 1864–1765 | Succeeded by Christian Gottlieb Kratzenstein |
