= Martin Hübner =

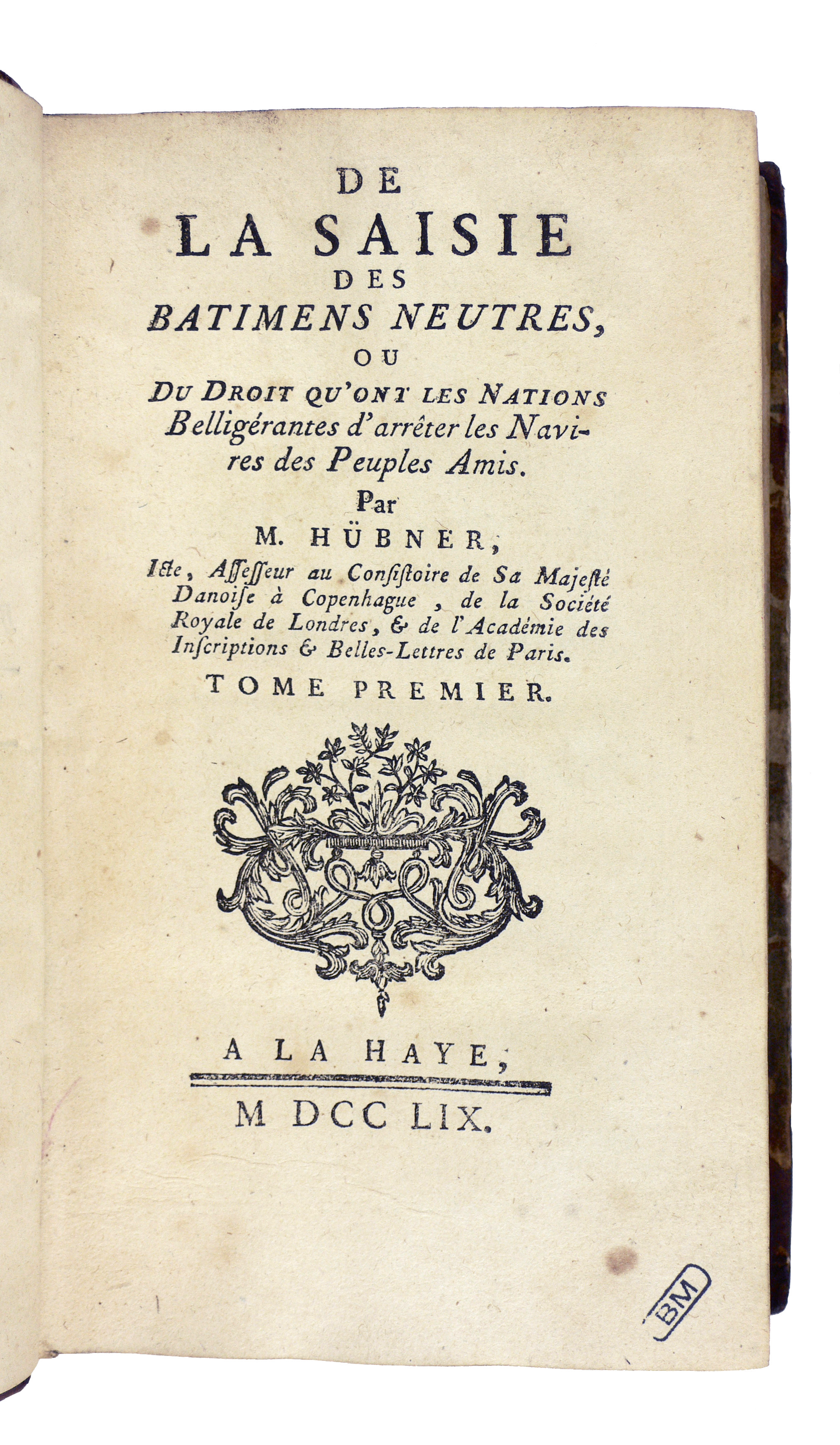
De la saisie des batimens neutres, 1759.

Martin Hübner (c. 1723 – 1795) was a Danish jurist noted for his contributions to international law.

Born in Hannover and brought up in Denmark, Hübner studied law there and was appointed professor at the University of Copenhagen in 1761. Later he was a high government official.

In his principal work, De la saisie des bâtiments neutres (1759), he was the first to formulate the rule that cargo on neutral ships is not a legitimate prize in warfare. This principle was later internationally acknowledged in the 1856 Paris Declaration Respecting Maritime Law.
