= Johannes Isacius Pontanus =

Dutch historian (1571–1639)

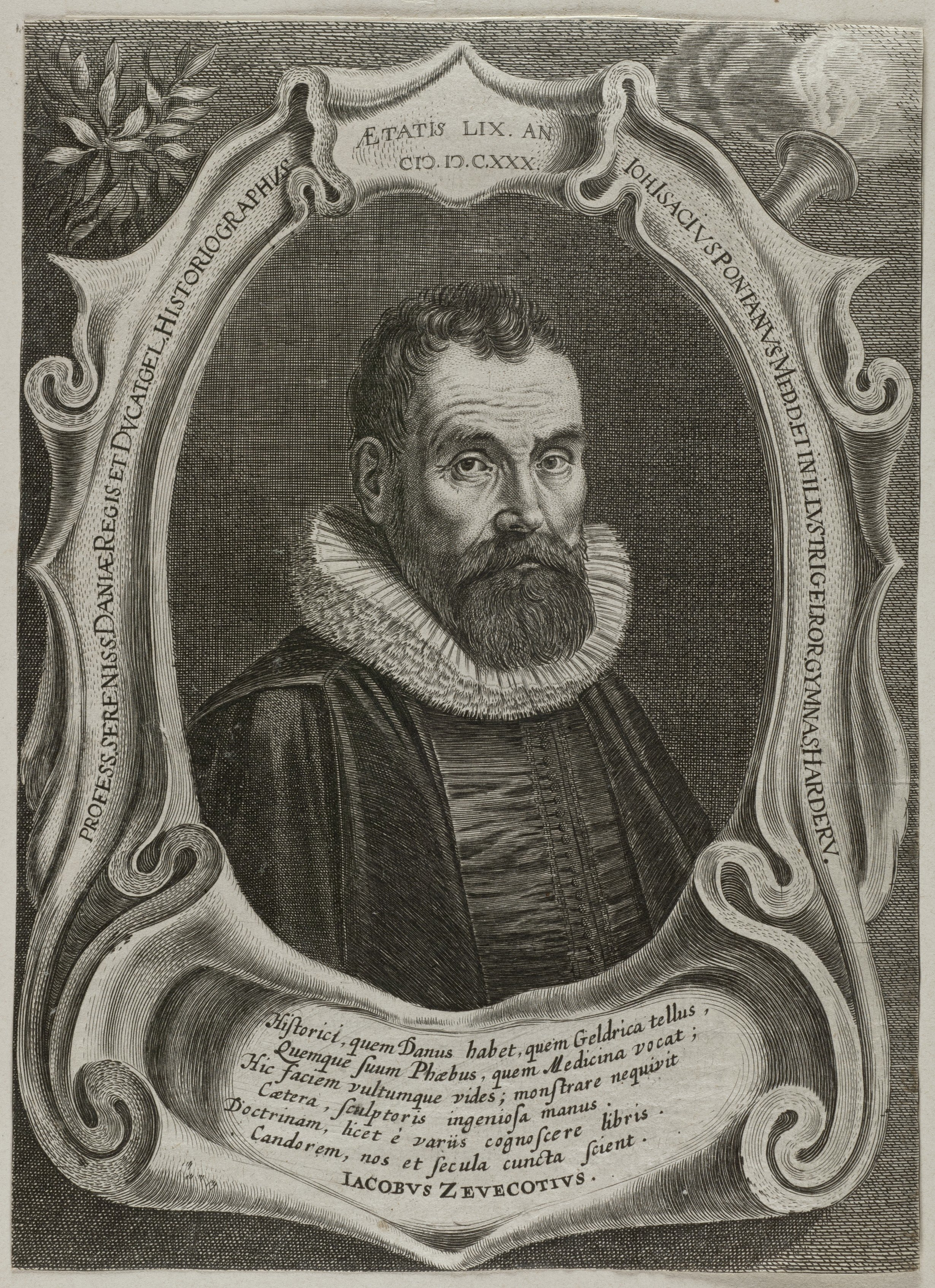
Joannes Pontanus

Johan Isaaksz Pontanus (21 January 1571 – 7 October 1639) was a Dutch historiographer.

== Biography ==
Born 21 January 1571, Pontanus was the son of Margaretha van Delen and Isaac Pietersz, the Dutch consul to Denmark stationed in Helsingør. The painter Pieter Isaacsz (1568–1625) was his older brother. In 1578, his family returned to the Netherlands and Pontanus grew up in Amsterdam. In 1589, he enrolled as a medical student at the University of Franeker and in 1592 at Leiden University as "Joannes Hellespontius Danus", predating the apparent contraction "Pontanus" (he was said to be born at sea near Helsingør in the Danish Hellespont, the Øresund). The next year he defended his Dissertatio de rationalis animas facilitate and traveled to Rome, visiting German scholars on his return trip. Subsequently, Pontanus visited Denmark where his parents had returned and became acquainted with Tycho Brahe and Arild Huitfeldt. In 1596, he spent mostly in England, visiting Canterbury, Oxford and Stanford. The following years he traveled to German, Swiss and French cities, in part escorting three young family members of Brahe.

In 1604, he was appointed professor at the Gelderse Academie in Harderwijk, where he remained teaching the rest of his life. Pontanus is best known for writing histories of places and countries. His history of Amsterdam (1611) was considered the first of this city. It was controversial enough to be blacklisted by the Roman church. In 1618, he was asked to write a history of Denmark in Latin, for which he was appointed as the Royal Danish official historian; he continued writing this work until his death but only managed to publish the first part in 1631. In 1621, he was asked to write a history of Guelders which he based largely on work of Paulus Merula en Johannes Luntius and finished in 1639.

Pontanus married Annetjen van den Herde (or Heerde, Heede) in May and June 1606 in Amsterdam/Harderwijk. They had at least four children. He died in Harderwijk in 1639, nine years before the academy was officially declared the University of Harderwijk.

== Works ==
- Analectorum libri III (Rostock, 1599, in-4°).
- Historia urbis et rerum Amstelodamensium (Amsterdam, 1611, in-fol.).
- Originum Francicarum libri VI (Harderwijk, 1616, in-4°).
- De Pygmæis (Harderwyck,1629, in-4°).
- Rerum Danicarum historia (Amsterdam, 1631, in-fol.): first volume only; the 2nd volume was published in Flensburg (1737, in-fol.).
- Poematum libri VI (Amsterdam, 1631).
- Discussiones historicae (Harderwijk, 1637, in-8°)
- Historia geldrica (Harderwijk, 1639).
