= Dyrkøb 7 =

Listed building in Copenhagen

Dyrkøb
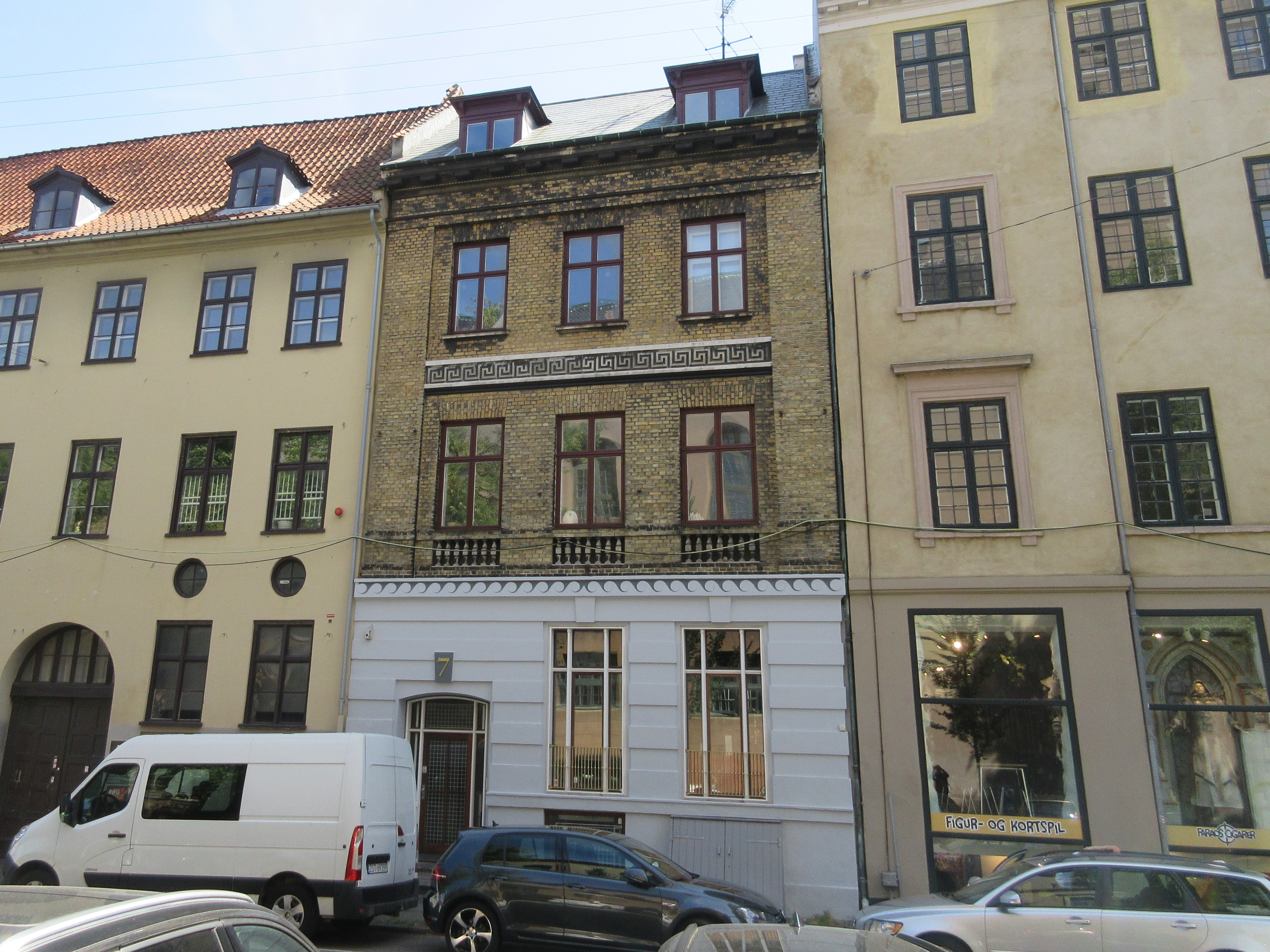
- Interactive map of the Dyrkøb area

General information
- Location: Copenhagen, Denmark
- Coordinates: 55°40′44.22″N 12°34′21.25″E
- Completed: 1870

Dyrløb 7 is a Neoclassical property situated on the street Dyrkøb, opposite the Church of Our Lady, in the Old Town of Copenhagen, Denmark. The building was listed in the Danish registry of protected buildings and places in 1945. Notable former residents include the painter Malthe Engelsted.

== History ==
=== Site history, 1689–1870 ===
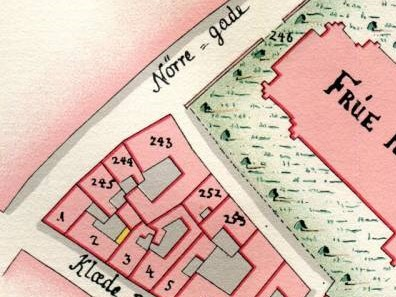
No. 252 seen on a detail from Christian Gedde's map of Klædebo Quarter, 1757.

The property was listed in 1689 as No. 247 in Klædebo Quarter owned by one Jacob Jacobsen. In the new cadastre of 1756, it was listed as No. 252. It was at that time owned by the chief grave digger at the Church of Our Lady, Mads Poller. Most of what is now Dyrkøb was at this point still the site of the Church of Our Lady's churchyard.

In the new cadastre of 1806, the property was listed as No. 249. It was owned at that time by captain Ole Jensen. Together with the Church of Our Lady, the property was destroyed in the British bombardment in 1807. When the church was rebuilt to a new design by Christian Frederik Hansen, the churchyard was not restored.

=== Current building, 1870–present ===
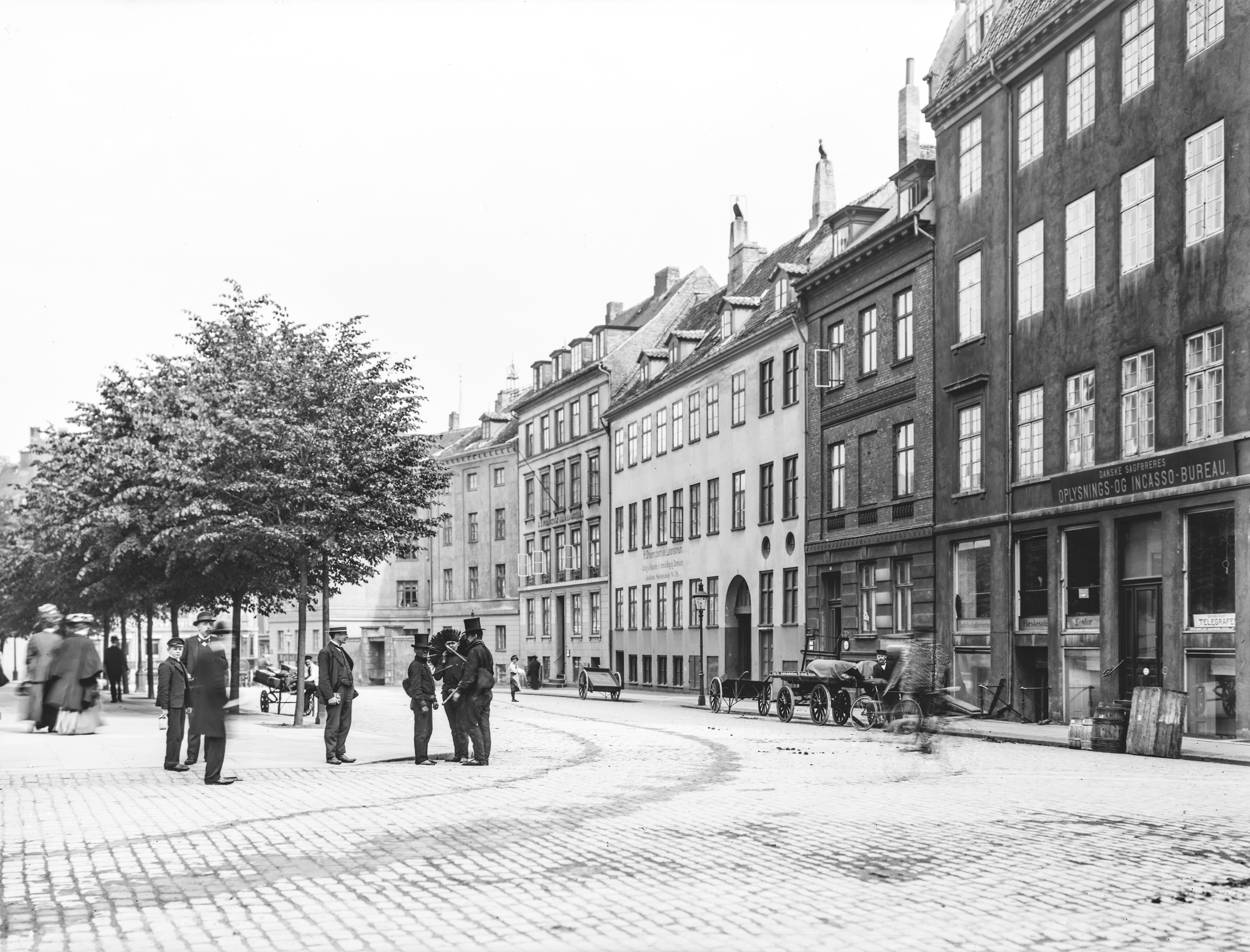
The building seen on a photography by Johannes Hauerslev.

The current building on the site was constructed in 1870 for high court attorney Ludvig Peter Christian Engberg (1829–1890). He was married to Karen Albertine Hansen. Their son Ludvig Albert Engberg (1868–1925) would also become a lawyer. His elder half-sister Laura Dorthea Kirstine Find Engberg (1871–) was married to the high court attorney Andreas Nicolaj Hallager. The building was damaged by fire in 1885. Engberg died in 1890.

The painter Malthe Engelsted (1852–1930) was a resident of the building from November 1891 to May 1896.

== Architecture ==
Dyrløb 7 is constructed with three storeys above a walk-out basement and is just three bays wide. The facade is designed in a style resembling Neoclassical properties from the late 18th and early 19th century. The ground floor is plastered and finished with shadow joints while the upper part is in undressed brick. Decorative elements include a belt course with a Vitruvian scroll above the ground floor, blind balustrades below the first floor windows, a Greek key frieze between the two upper floors and a modillioned cornice. A two-bay side wing extends from the rear side of the building. A one-storey modern extension has incorporated the entire courtyard into the ground floor.

== Today ==
The property was owned by APS Alfred Karsberg as of 2008. Andreas Hötzer, a violin maker, is based on the second floor.

== See also ==
- Kunstnerkollegiet
