= Povl Badstuber House =

Building in Copenhagen, Denmark

- Povl Badstubers Gård
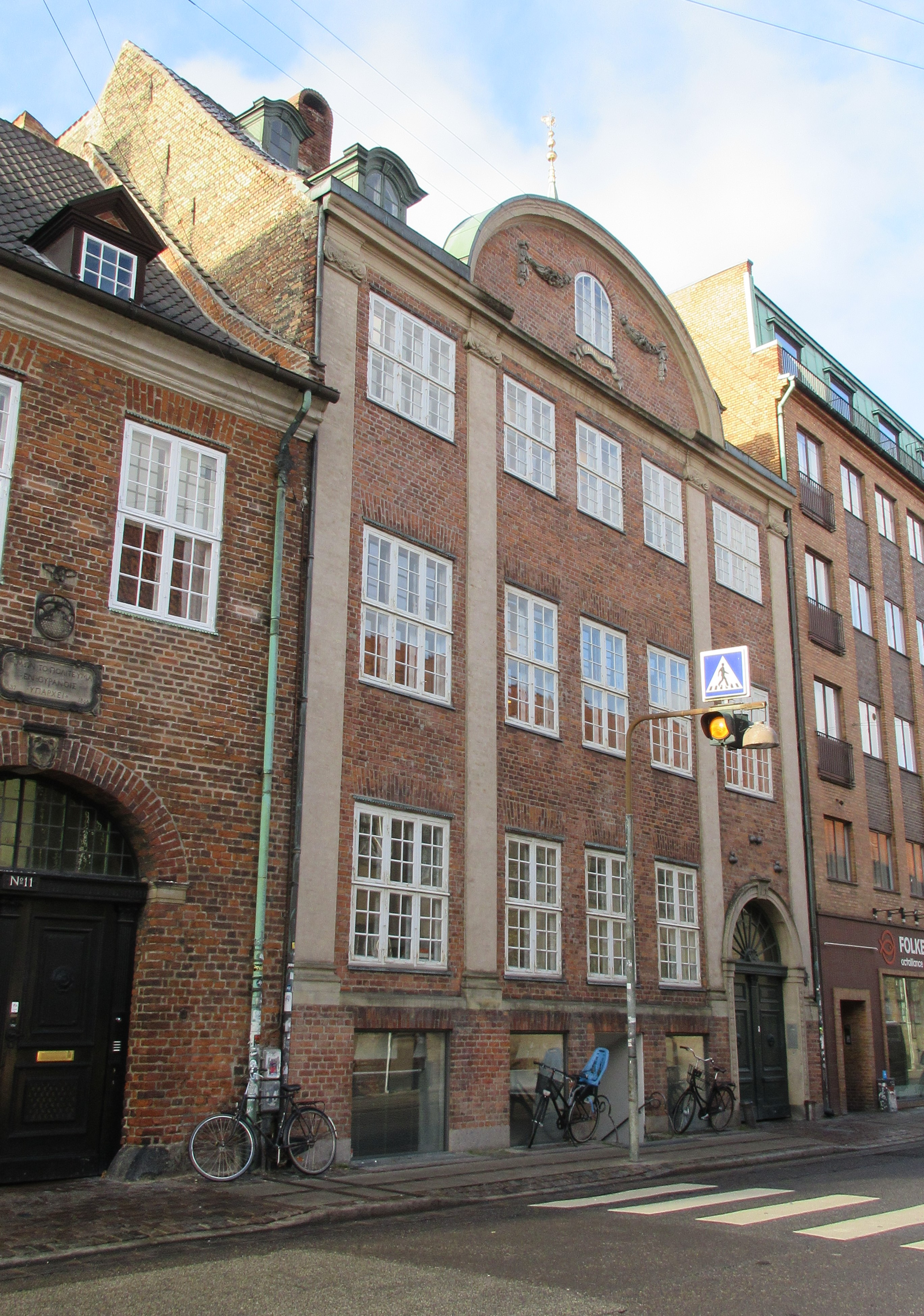
- Interactive map of the Povl Badstuber House area

General information
- Location: Copenhagen, Denmark
- Coordinates: 55°40′46.64″N 12°34′17.62″E
- Construction started: 1739
- Completed: 1732
- Client: Povl Badstuber

The Povl Badstuber House (Danish: Povl Badstubers Gård) is a historic property at Nørregade 13 in the Old Town of Copenhagen, Denmark. The building was listed in the Danish registry of protected buildings and places in 1918.

== History ==
=== 18th century ===
The property was in the late 17th century made up of two smaller properties (numbers 35 and 36) in the city's North Quarter (Nørre Kvarter). No. 35 was by 1689 owned by coppersmith Lorens Bastuber. No. 36 was owned by dyer Werner von Diefendof.

The current building was constructed in 1730–1732 for cobbersmith and manufacturer Povl Badstuber. Povl Badstuber had to sell the house when he went bankrupt after a few years.

In the new cadastre of 1756m the property was listed as No. 38. It was by then owned by professor Christian Gottlieb Kratzenstein.

At the time of the 1787 census, No. 37 was home to just two households. Hermann Hinrich Könemann (1746-1822), a secretary of the Supreme Court, resided in the building with his wife Barbra Catrine Schønheyder, their four daughters (aged one to six), a male servant, a caretaker, a wet nurse and two maids. Henriette Margrethe van Deurs (née Kønemann), the 40-year-old widow of Jean Christopher van Deurs, resided in the building with her two sons (aged 13 and 18) and two maids.

=== 19th century ===
Herman Henneh Køneman was by 1801 still residing in the building. Dorthe Hansen, a 54-year-old widow, resided in the building with her 24-year-old daughter and a maid. Cathrine Marie Honzem a 40-year-old widow, resided in the building with a 11-year-old son and one maid.

In the new cadastre of 1806, the property was listed as No. 31. It was by then still owned by Kønneman.

At the time of the 1840 census, No. 31 was home to four households. Frederik Thomsen, a judge at the Copenhagen Police Court, resided on the ground floor with his wife Elisabeth Nicoline Thomsen (née Malling), their 12-year-old daughter Christiane Thomsen and one maid. Marie Chatrine Lund, widow of merchant (grosserer) Jens Lund, resided on the first floor with two unmarried daughters (aged 20 and 24), a housekeeper, one male servant and two maids. Peder Malling, an architect and professor at the Royal Danish Academy of Fine Arts, resided on the second floor with the 52-year-old widow Frederikke Amalia Giersing, Giersing's seven children (aged nine to 25), one lodger and one maid. Jens Petersen, the concierge, resided in the basement with his wife Cecilie Marie Petersen and their four children (aged one to 14).

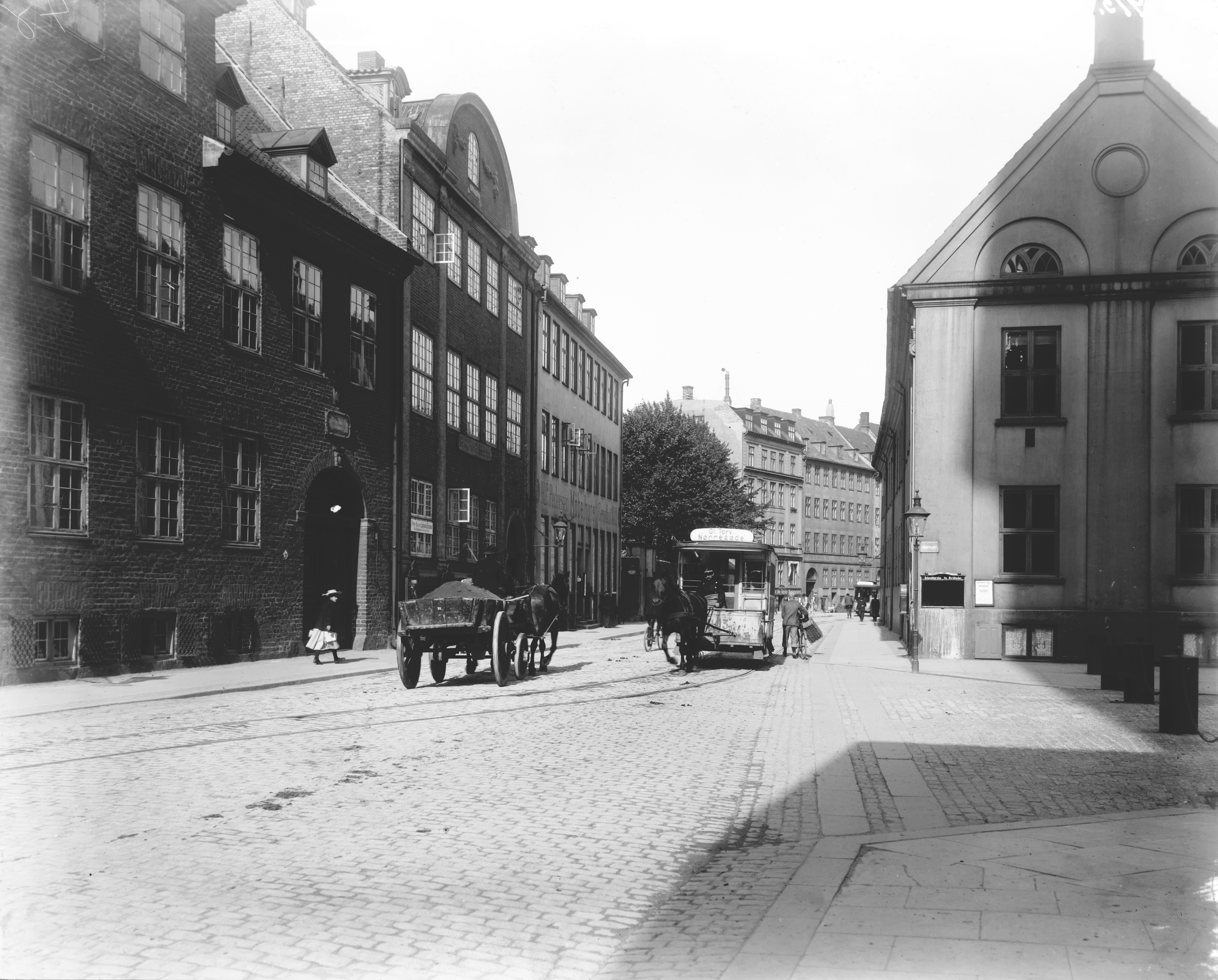
The building photographed by Frederik Riise.

The historian Frederik E. Schiern (1816–1882) lived in the building from 1847 until 1852. The architect Peder Malling (1787–1865) was again a resident on the second floor in 1860–1865.

== Architecture ==
The building is three floors tall and five bays wide. The facade is decorated with dour pilasters flanking the two double-wide corner bays and is tipped by a rounded wall dormer. Eight cannon balls are embedded in the masonry above the gate. They were found in the building in connection with a renovation in about 1900. The building was listed in 1918.

== See also ==
- Listed buildings in Copenhagen Municipality
