= Skindergade 38 =

Listed building in Copenhagen

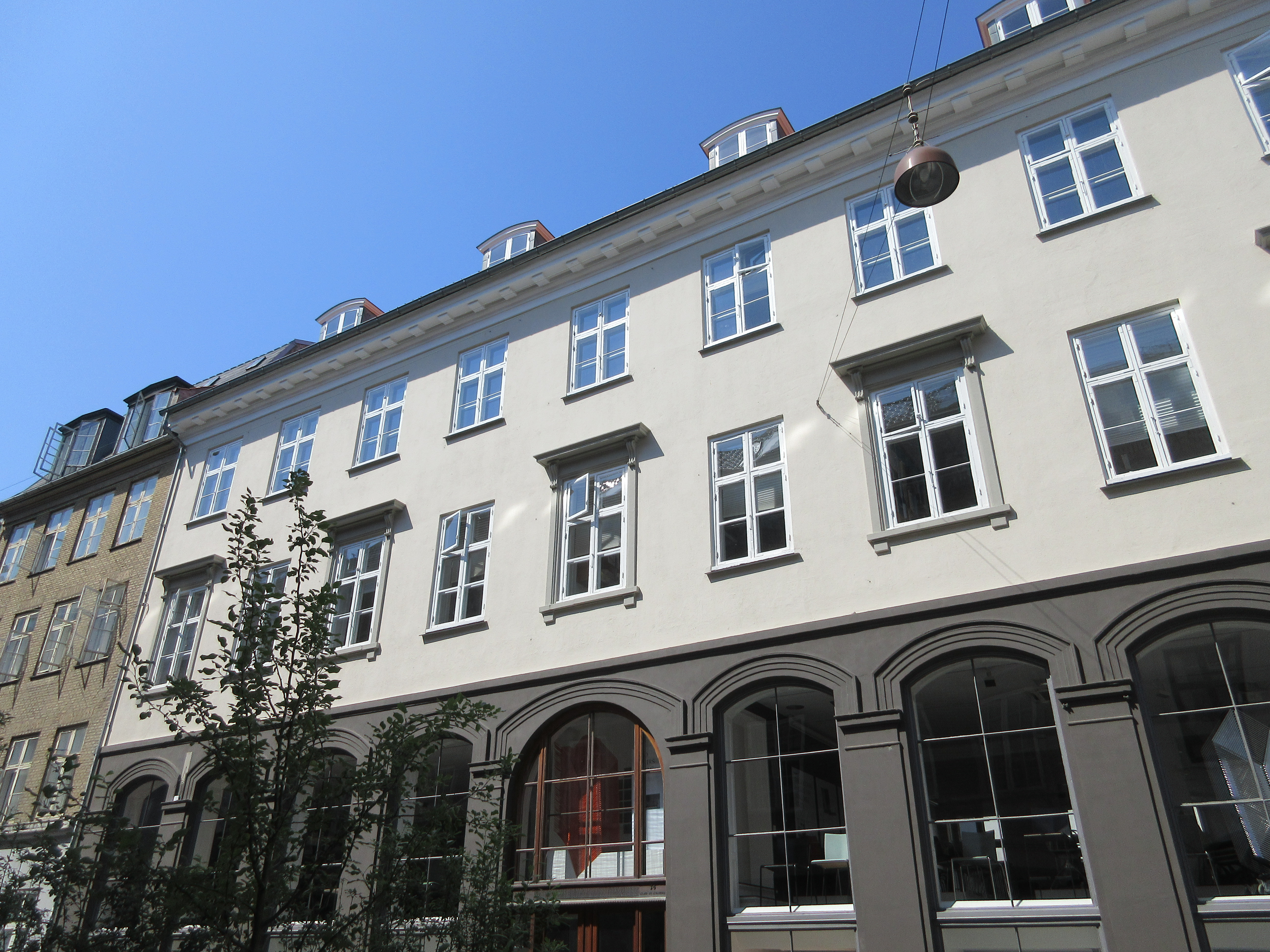
- Interactive map of the Skindergade 38 area

General information
- Location: Copenhagen, Denmark
- Coordinates: 55°40′43.61″N 12°34′22.66″E
- Completed: 1814/1822
- Renovated: 1850, c- 1900

Skindergade 38/Dyrkøb 5 is a four-winged complex of 19th-century buildings with a nine-bays-long facade on Skindergade (No. 38) and a 10-bays-long facade on Dyrkøb, opposite the Church of Our Lady, in the Old Town of Copenhagen, Denmark. The two buildings fronting the streets were listed in the Danish registry of protected buildings and places in 1951. The two side wings—which attach them to each other along each their side of a central courtyard—are not part of the heritage listing. From October 1852 until his death three years later, Søren Kierkegaard was a lodger in the apartment on the first floor (towards Skindergade). Other notable former residents include the politicians Janus Lauritz Andreas Kolderup-Rosenvinge, Orla Lehmann and Valdemar Rudolph von Raasløff.

== Architecture ==
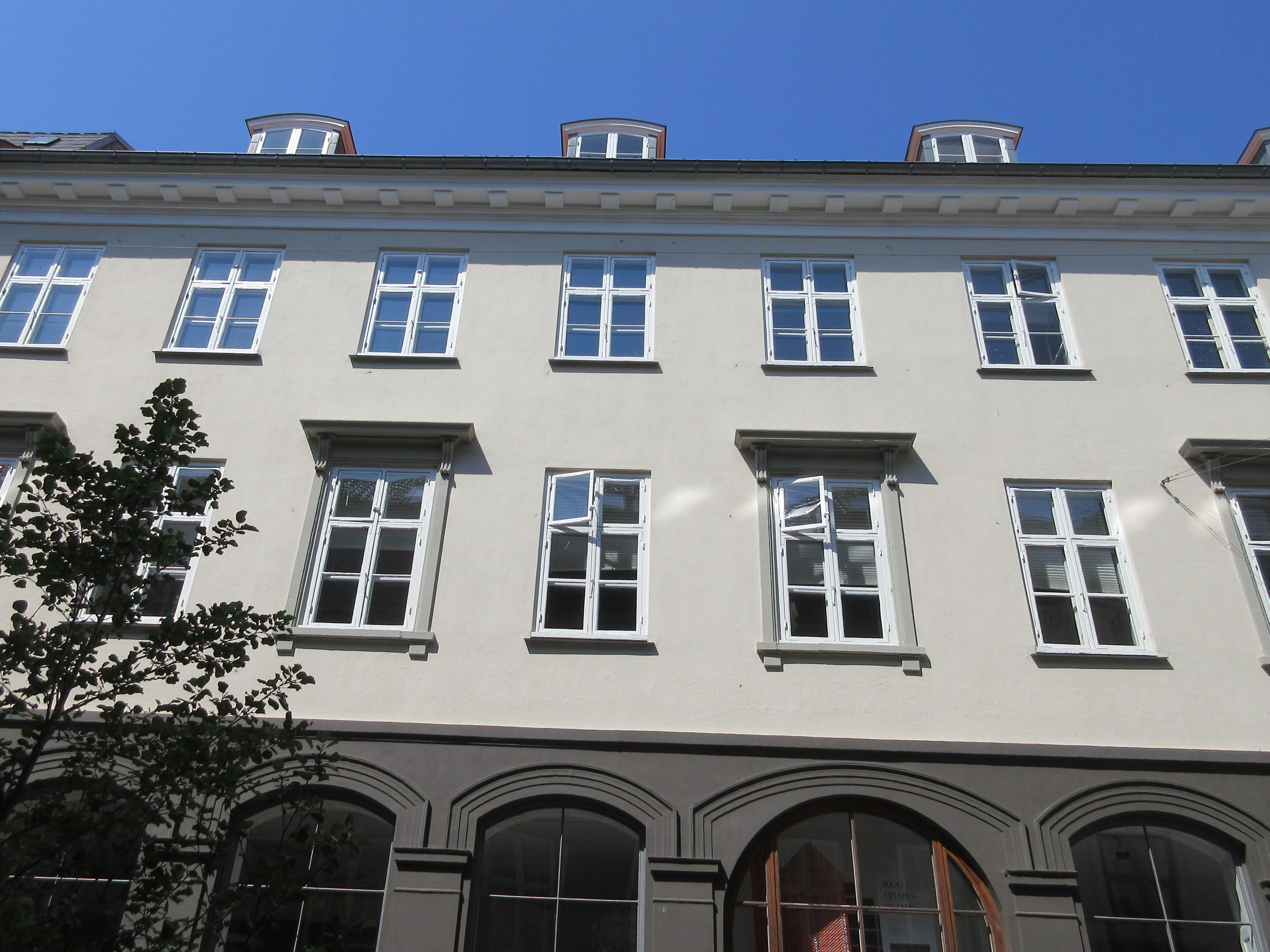
Skindergade 38

Skindergade is constructed with three storeys over a walk-out basement and is nine bays long. The design of the ground floor with large, arched display window's dates from around 1900. Every second window on the first floor are accented with framing and hood moulds supported by corbels. The pitched roof features four dormer windows towards the street.

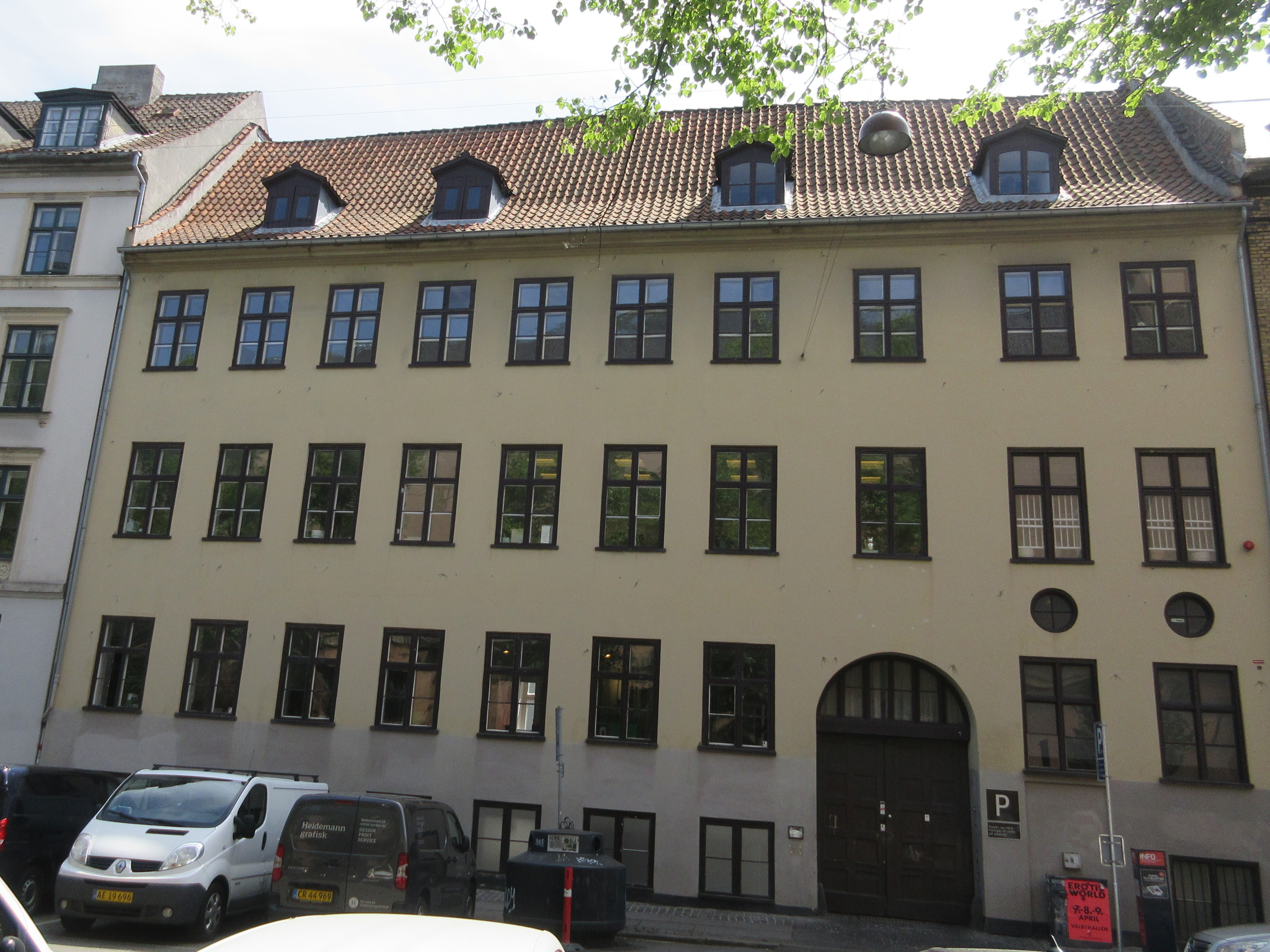
Dyrkøb 5.

Dyrkøb 5 is also constructed with three storeys over a walk-out basement but is ten bays long. The plastered facade is painted in a pale yellow colour. A gate with access to the courtyard is located in the bay furthest to the right. Two round windows are located next to the gate at the transition between the ground floor and first floor. The pitched red tile roof features three dormer windows towards the street.

The two buildings are attached to each other via two side wings along each their side of a central courtyard. Skindergade 38 has seven exposed towards the courtyard as well as a canted corner bay. Dyrløb 5 had just five exposed bays towards the courtyard.

The two wings fronting the streets were listed in the Danish registry of protected buildings and places in 1951. The two side wings are not part of the heritage listing.
