= Povl Badstuber =

Danish coppersmith and manufacturer

Povl Badstuber (1685 – 3 December 1762) was a Danish coppersmith and manufacturer.

== Early life and education ==
Badstuber was born in Copenhagen in 1685 to coppersmith Lorentz Badstuber (died 1692) and Anna Andreasdatter Knock (died 1725, married a second time to the merchant Jacob Zitzke, died 1708). He learned the trade from his father and inherited the father's property in Nørregade.

== Career ==
In 1719, Badstuber had title of court coppersmith. His works as such included the copper roof on Christian VI's Christiansborg Palace.

Badstuber 's father had already in the 1680s taken over the management Nymølle Copper Mill under Frederiksdal. He expanded his business with the acquisition of Brede Works in 1819 and obtained a monopoly on the production of copper and brass goods on the Danish islands. In 1738, when Frederikdal passed out of royal ownership, Badstuber was granted ownership of Nymølle to facilitate the establishment of a production of scythes and wire. He also owned farmland in Lundtofte and a farm in Søllerød. His house in Nørregade in Copenhagen was destroyed in the Copenhagen Fire of 1728 but rebuilt at great costs in 1730–32.

== Late years ==
In the 1730s, Badstuber experienced economic difficulties culminating with his bankruptcy in 1776. His properties in Copenhagen and North Zealand were sold at public auction at prices far lower than what they had cost him. His creditors wanted him imprisoned for his "shameful" bankruptcy which left them with a loss of 60,000 Danish rigsdaler. He spent his last years in Birkerød with his eldest daughter who was the widow of former pastor at Søllerød Church Andreas Cramer.

== Literature ==
- Hauch-Fausbøll, Thomas: Admiral Richelieus anetavle, 1931. pp. 48.
- Bruun, Carl: Kjøbenhavn II, 1890, pp 684.
- Nystrøm, F.: Søllerød sogn, 1911 pp 230.
