= Kunstnerkollegiet =

Artist dormatory in Copenhagen

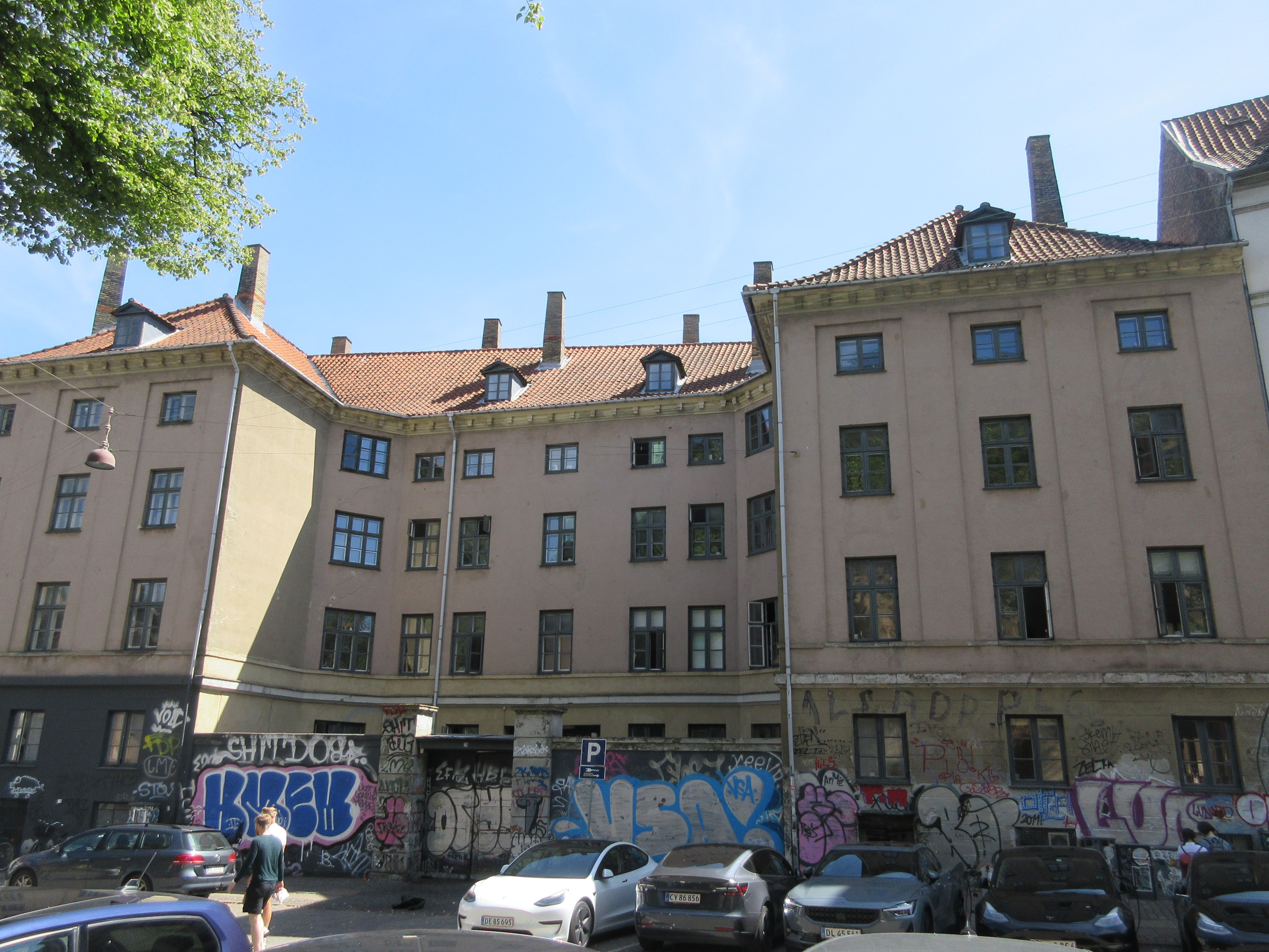
- Interactive map of the Kunstnerkollegiet area
- Former names: Trøstens Bolig

General information
- Architectural style: Neoclassical
- Location: Copenhagen, Denmark
- Coordinates: 55°40′44.76″N 12°34′24.6″E
- Completed: 1815

Design and construction
- Architect: Christian Frederik Hansen

Kunstnerkollegiet (The Artist Dorm) is a hall of residence with 32 apartments for students at the Royal Danish Academy of Fine Arts and other universities in Copenhagen, Denmark. It was founded in 1974 but its building, formerly known as Trøstens Bolig (The Dwelling of Consolation) and Soldins Stiftelse (Soldin's Foundation), traces its history back to the 1810s. It is a three-winged complex built in the Neoclassical style to design by Christian Frederik Hansen. The main entrance is located at Skindergade 34, but the three-winged complex is closed on the other side by a low wall with another gate at Dyrkøb 1 and one of the gables faces Fiolstræde.

== History ==
=== Trøstens Bolig ===
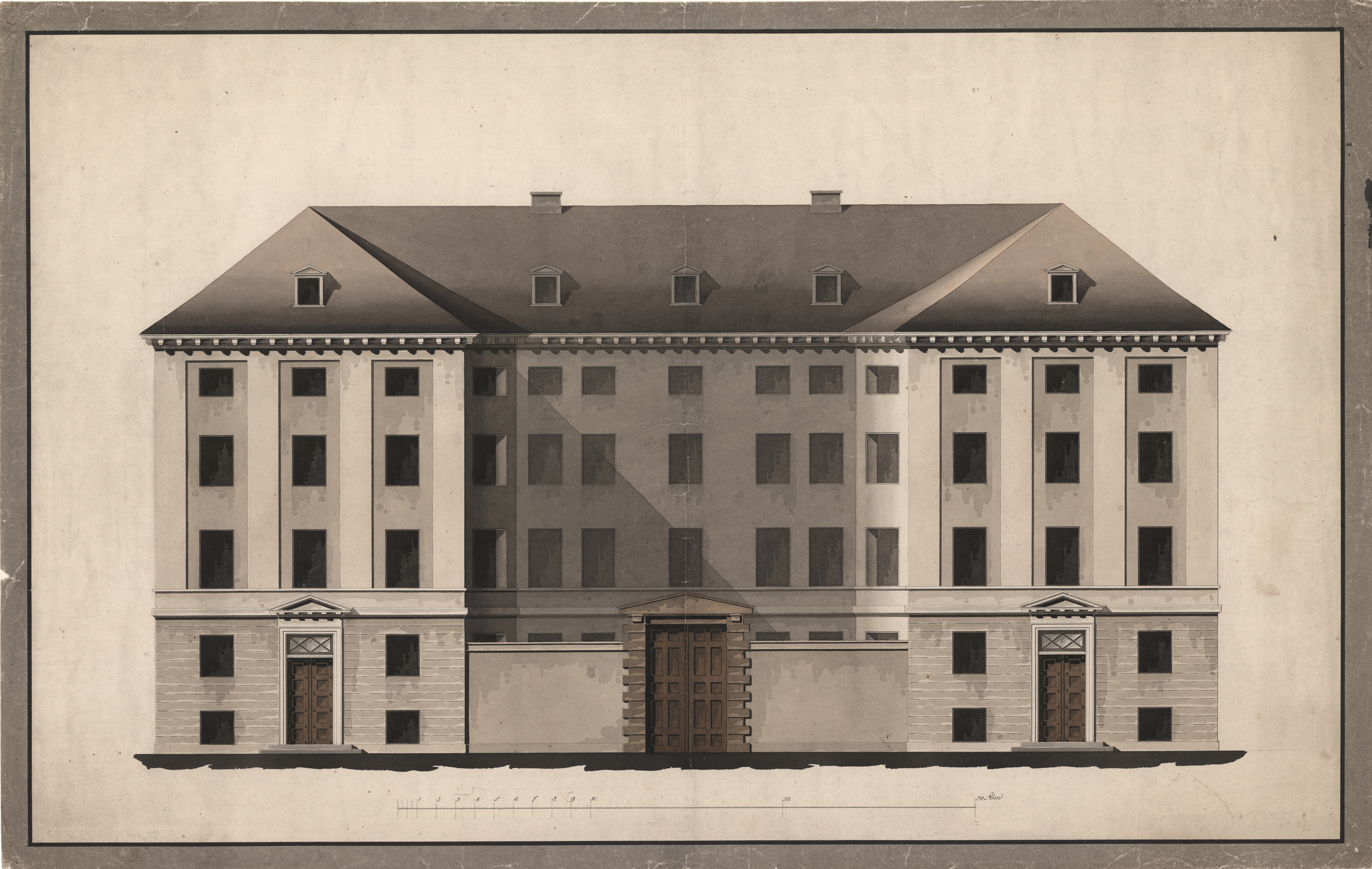
Rendering of the building as sen from Dyrkøb

The Metropolitan School was originally located at the site where the dormitory now stands. The school was destroyed in the British bombardment of Copenhagen in 1807 and later rebuilt on the other side of Fiolstræde. Its old site was instead used for a building with housing for indigent families known as Trøstens Bolig. It was constructed in 1812–15 to design by Christian Frederik Hansen who was also responsible for the rebuilding of Church of Our Lady and the new Metropolitan School.

=== Soldins Stiftelse ===
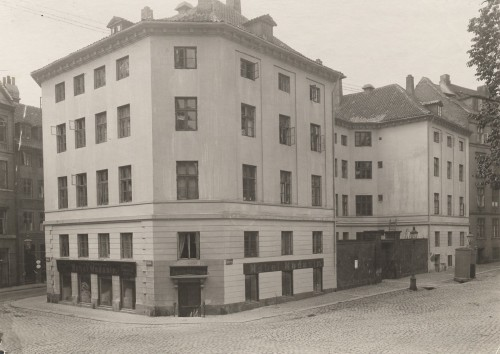
The building as seen from Fiolstræde

Soldins Stiftelse was founded in 1845 by Hanne Soldin (née Ruben) the widow of Salomon Soldin, a bookseller, publisher, editor and writer, who had died in 1837. The foundation acquired Trøstens Bolig and converted it into a home for indigent widows and unmarried women of the middle class in 1854. It comprised 29 residences with low rent and 11 residences with no rent.

=== Kunstnerkollegiet ===
In 1974, the building was converted into a dormitory of art students under the name Kunstnerkollegiet.

== Architecture ==
The building is a three-winged complex in four storeys. The main entrance is an arched gate at Skindergade 34. The complex is to the rear closed by a low wall on Dyrkøb.

== Gallery ==
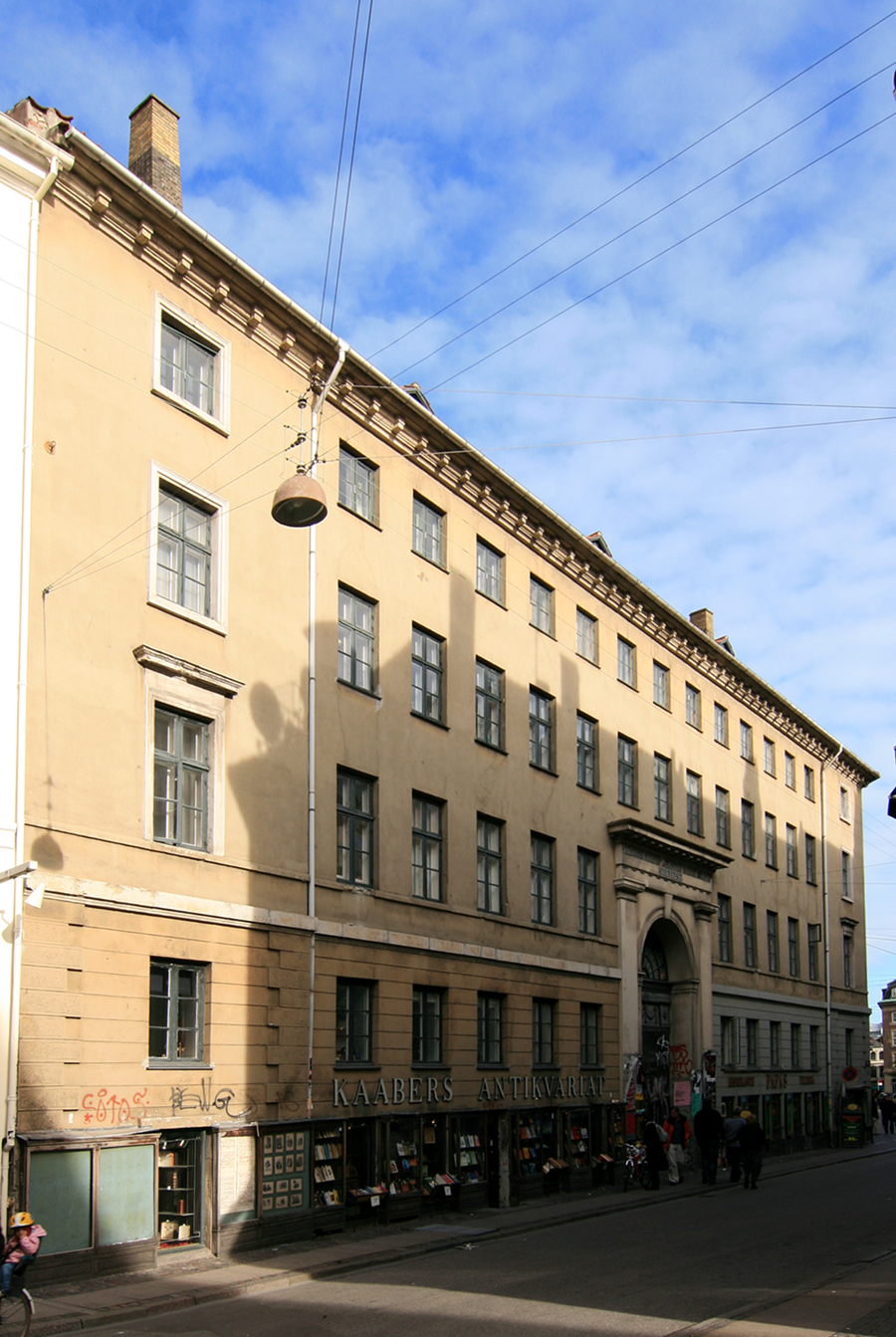
The facade on Skindergade

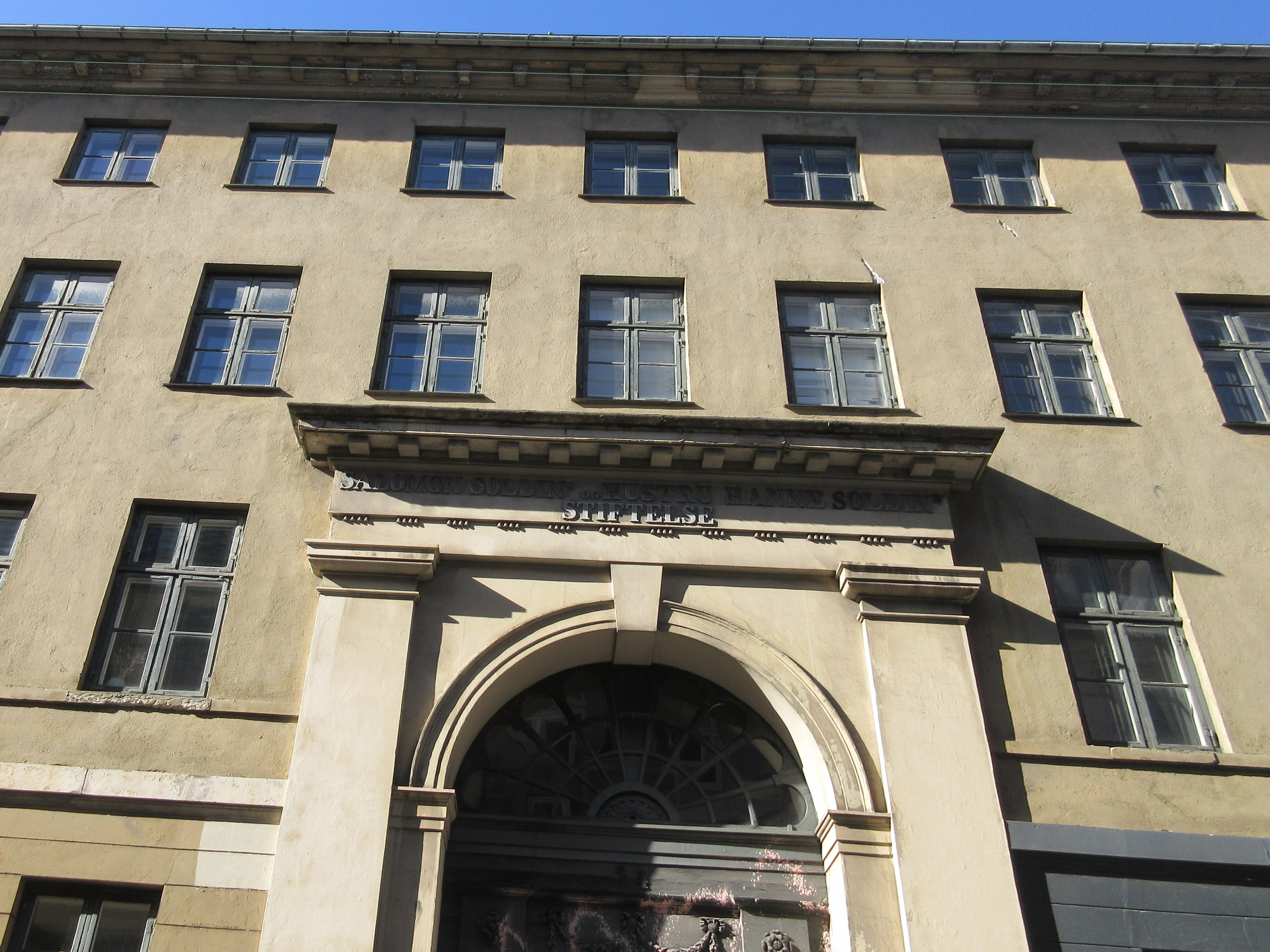
Detail of the facade towards Skindergade
