= Johannes Hauerslev =

Danish photographer (1860–1921)

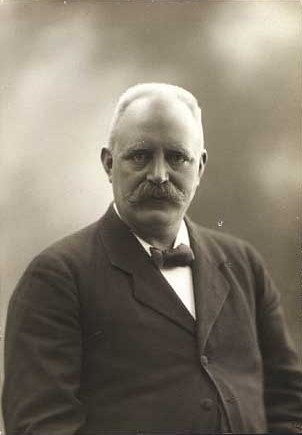
- Hauerslev photographed by Albert Schou jr.
- Born: 5 May 1860; Aalborg, Denmark
- Died: 21 October 1921 (aged 61); Charlottenlund, Denmark
- Resting place: Vestre Cemetery, Copenhagen
- Occupation: Photographer
- Years active: 1887 –1918

Johannes Hauerslev (5 May 1860 – 21 October 1921) was a Danish photographer. He is mainly remembered for his numerous photographs of street scenes and buildings in Copenhagen.

== Early life ==
Hauerslev was born in Aalborg, the son of Hans Peter Hauerslev and Petrine Jensine Bothilde Anette Martensen.

== Career ==
Hauerslev ran a photographic studio at Fælledvej 9 in Nørrebro from 1887 to 1918. It was after that continued by Alfred Andersen (from c. 1933; Alfred Munk-Andersen).

He was awarded a medal at the 1896 Baltic Exhibition in Malmö and was created a Knight in the order of the Dannebrog in 1910.

He was a member of the Danish Association of Photographers and strongly involved in the establishment of the Photographers' House (Fotografernes Stiftelse) at Ruesgade 199 in Copenhagen.

== Personal life ==
Hauerslev was married to Georgine Rosalie Hauerslev. They had one daughter, Katy Hauerslev. He died on 21 October 1821 in Charlottenlund and was buried in Vestre Cemetery.

== Gallery ==
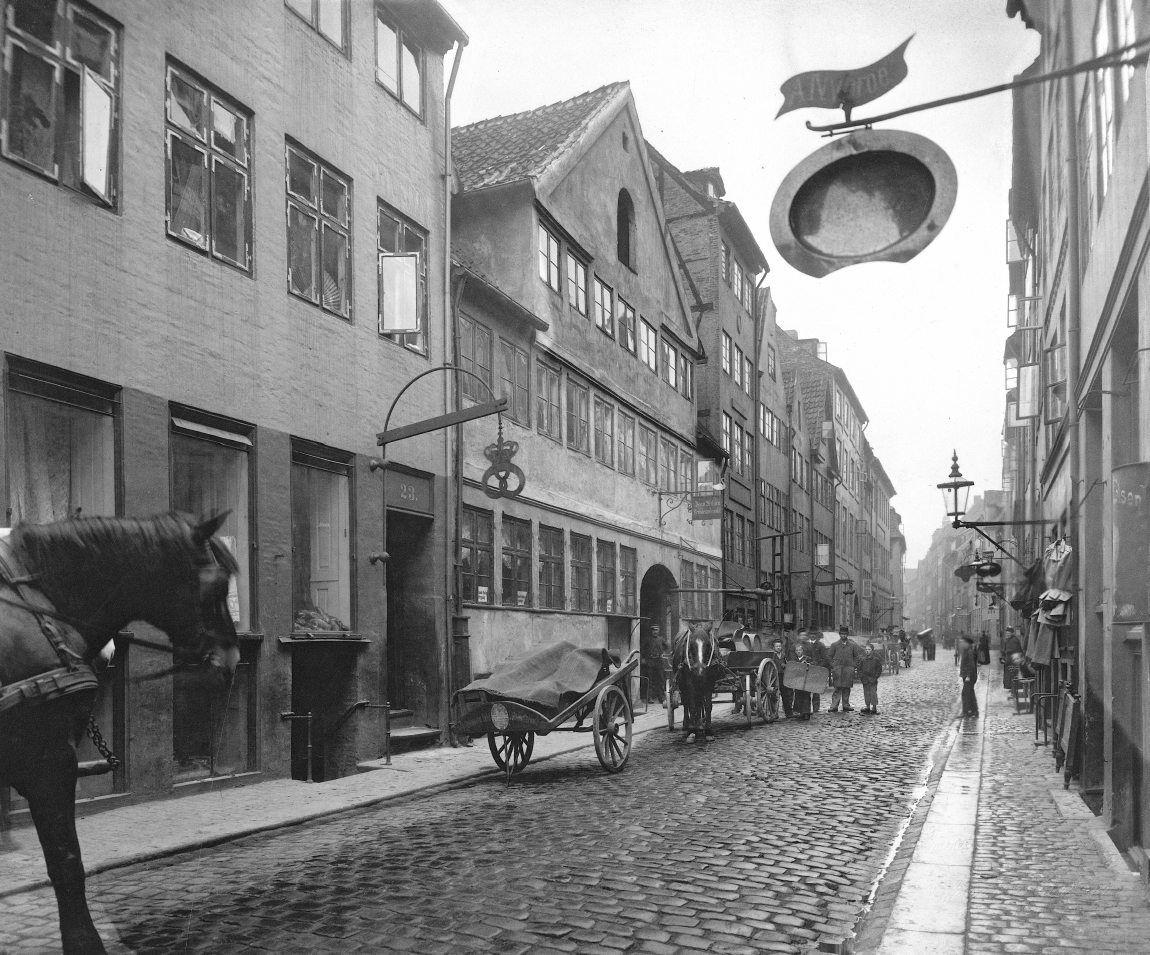
Vognmagergade

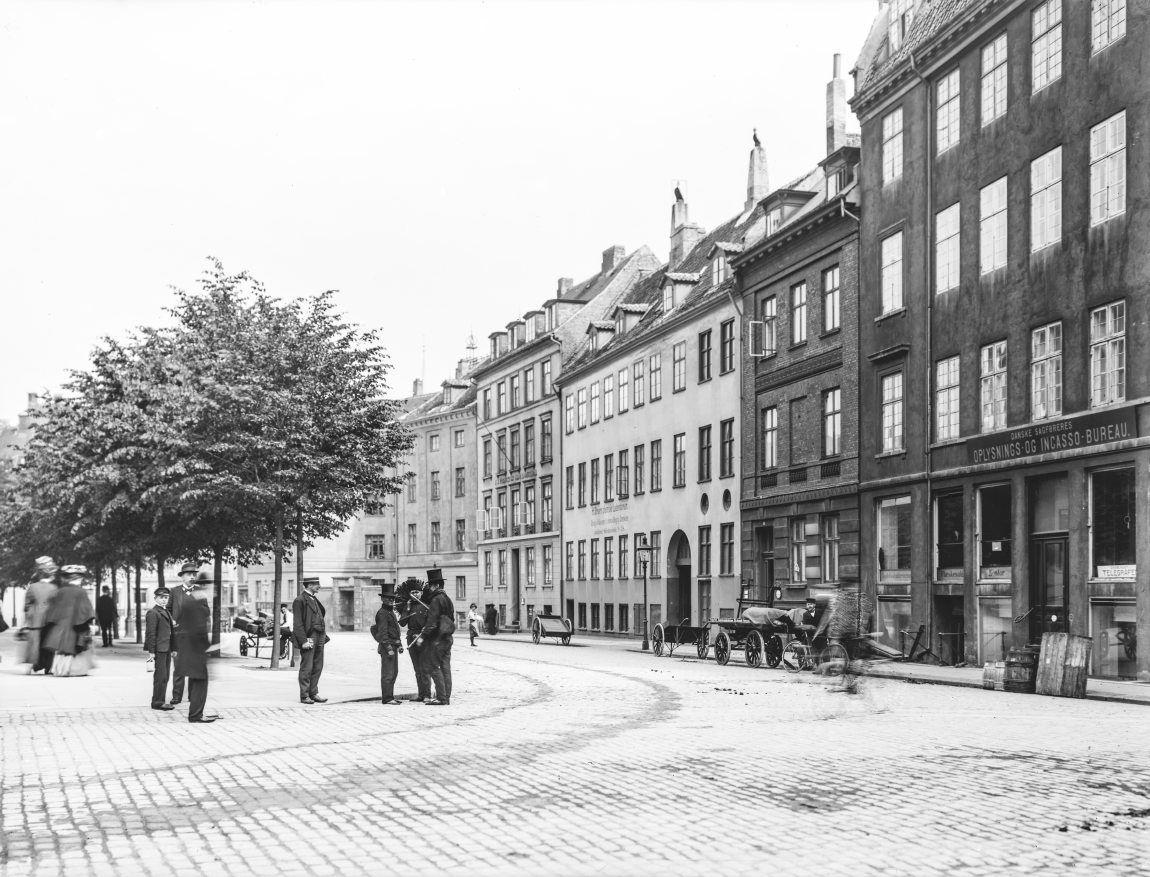
Dyrkøb

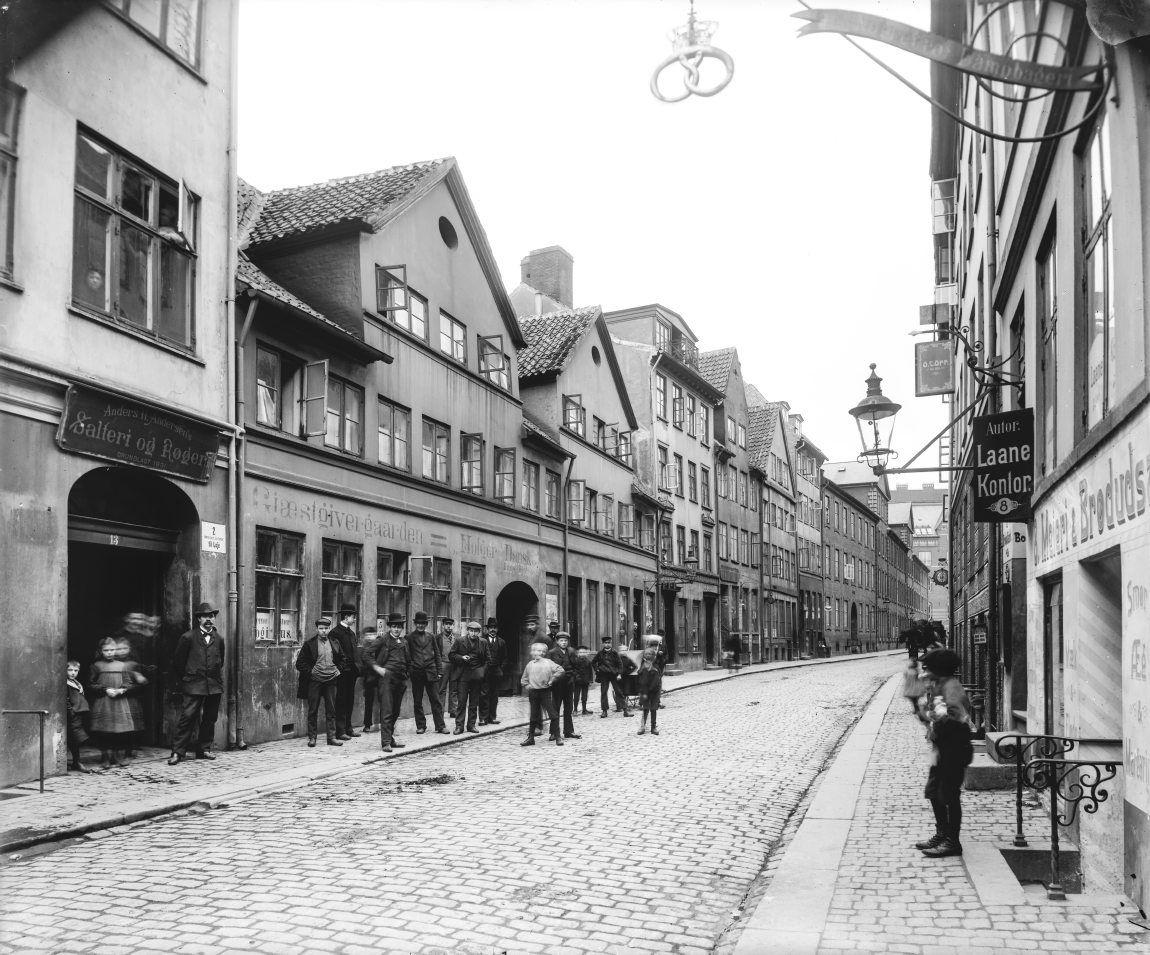
The Holger Danske Guesthouse in Farvergade

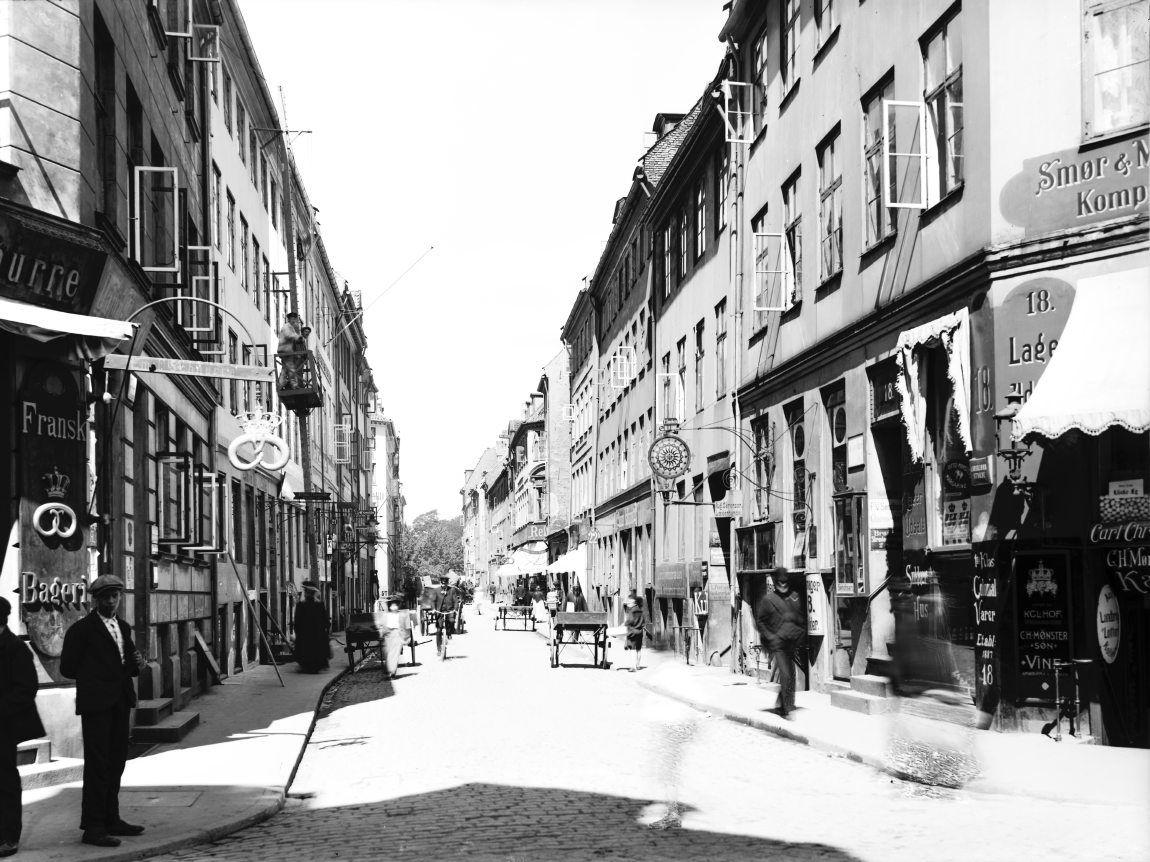
Larsbjørnsstræde

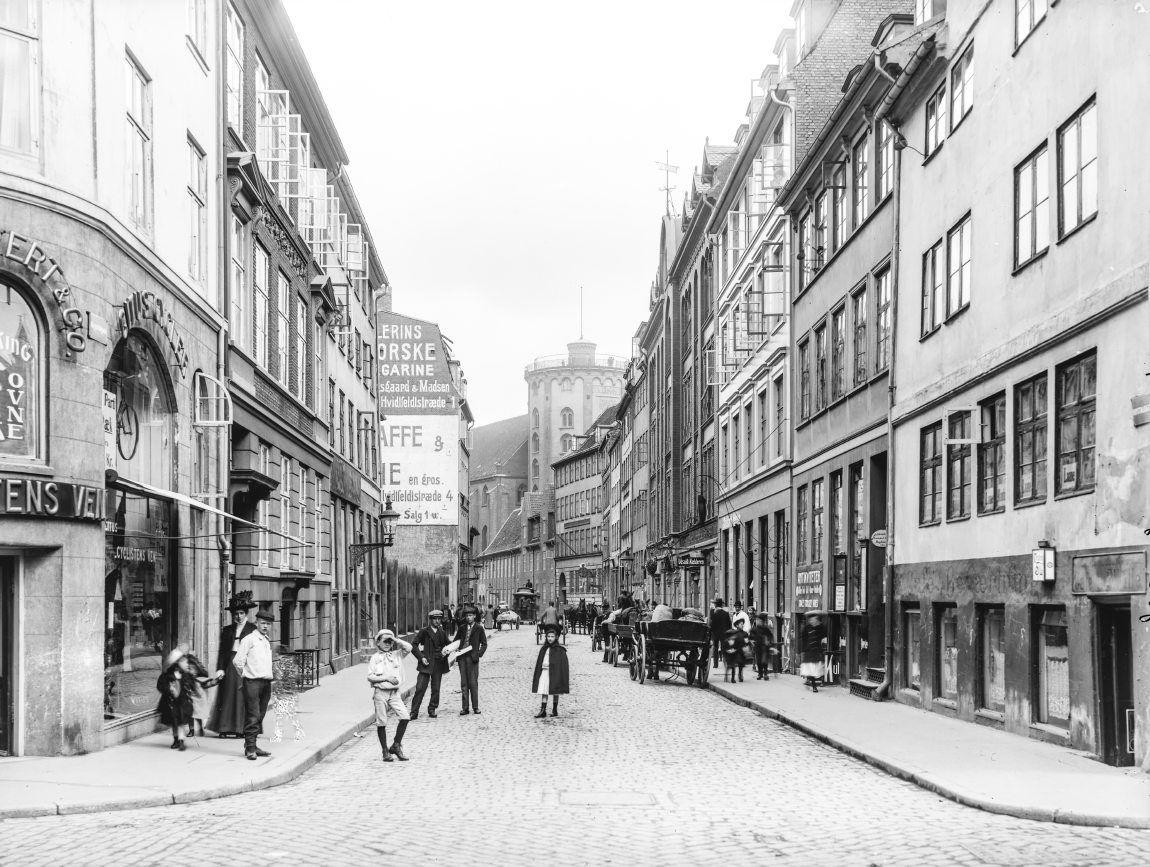
Krystalgade

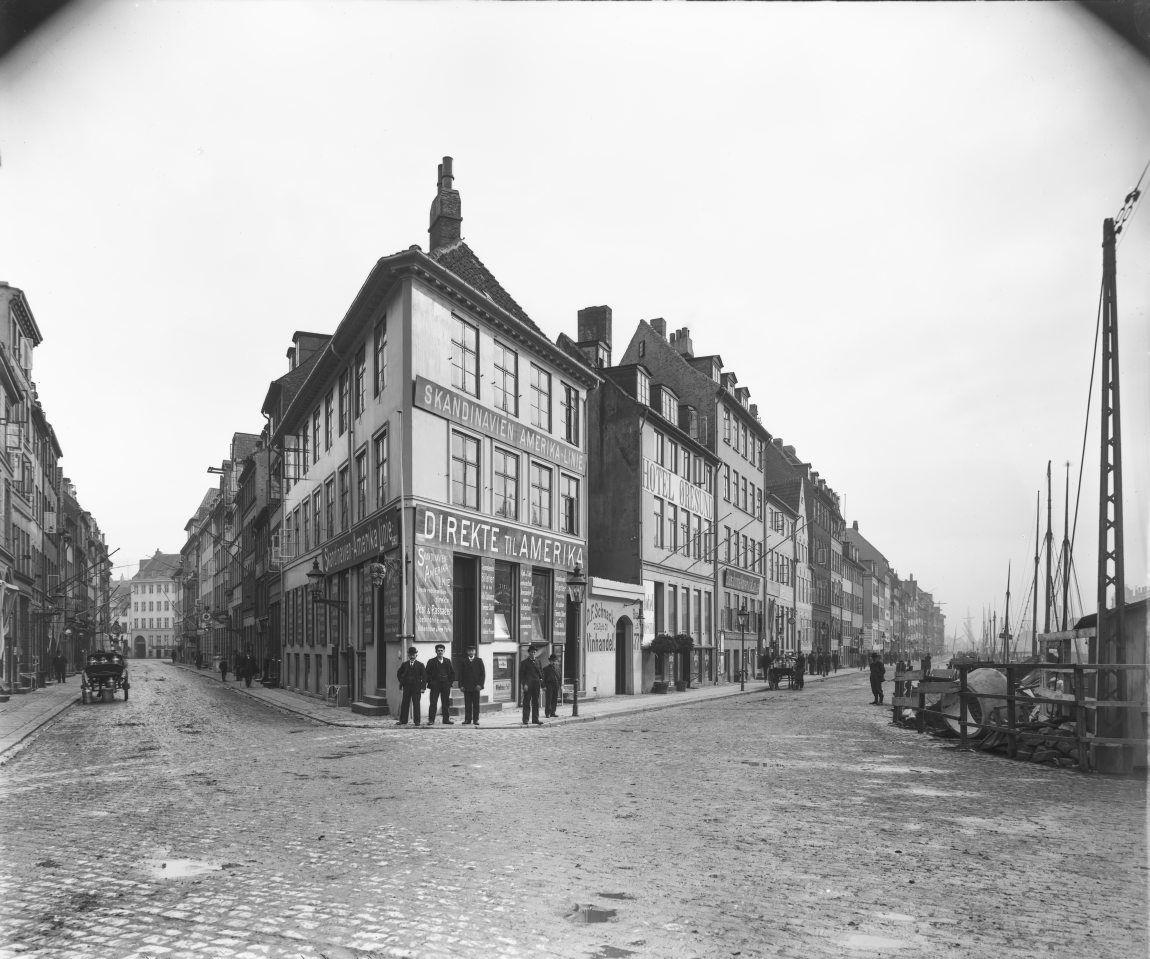
The corner of Nyhavn and Store Strandstræde

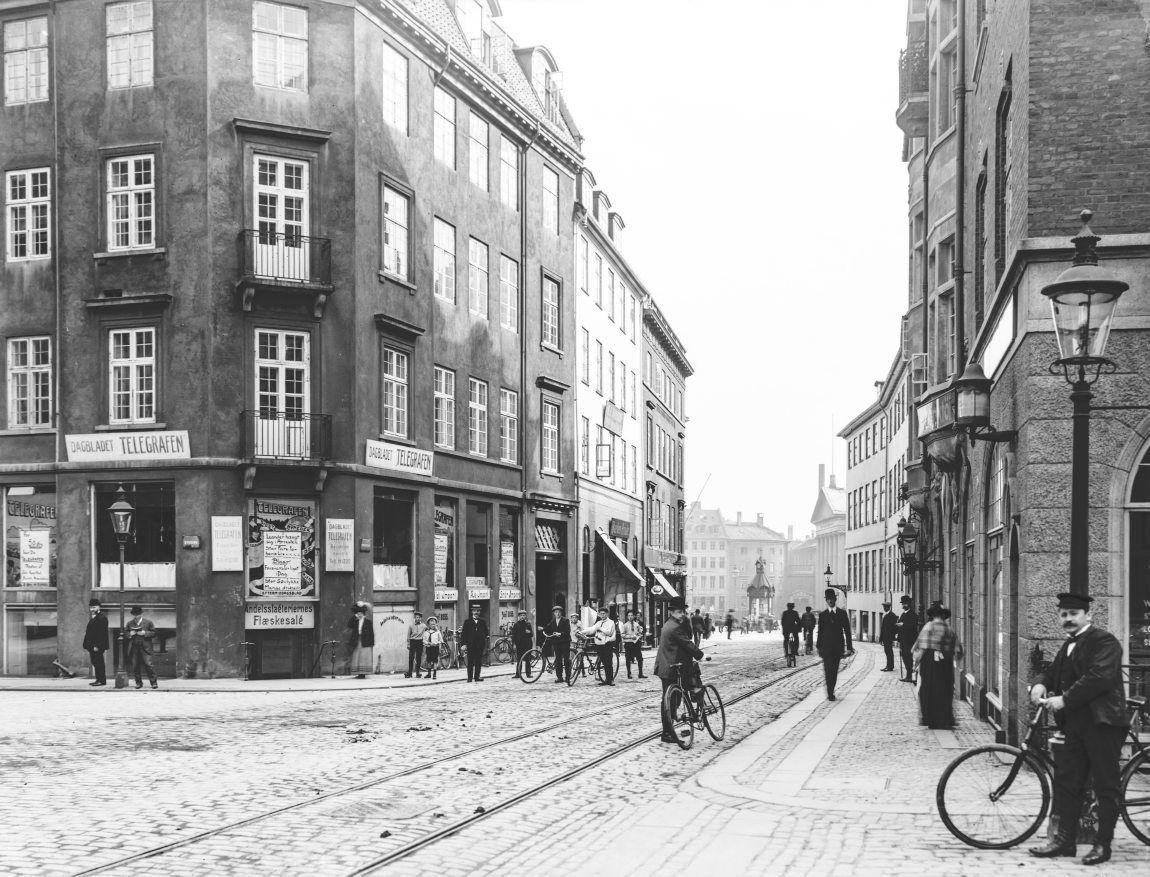
Nørregade

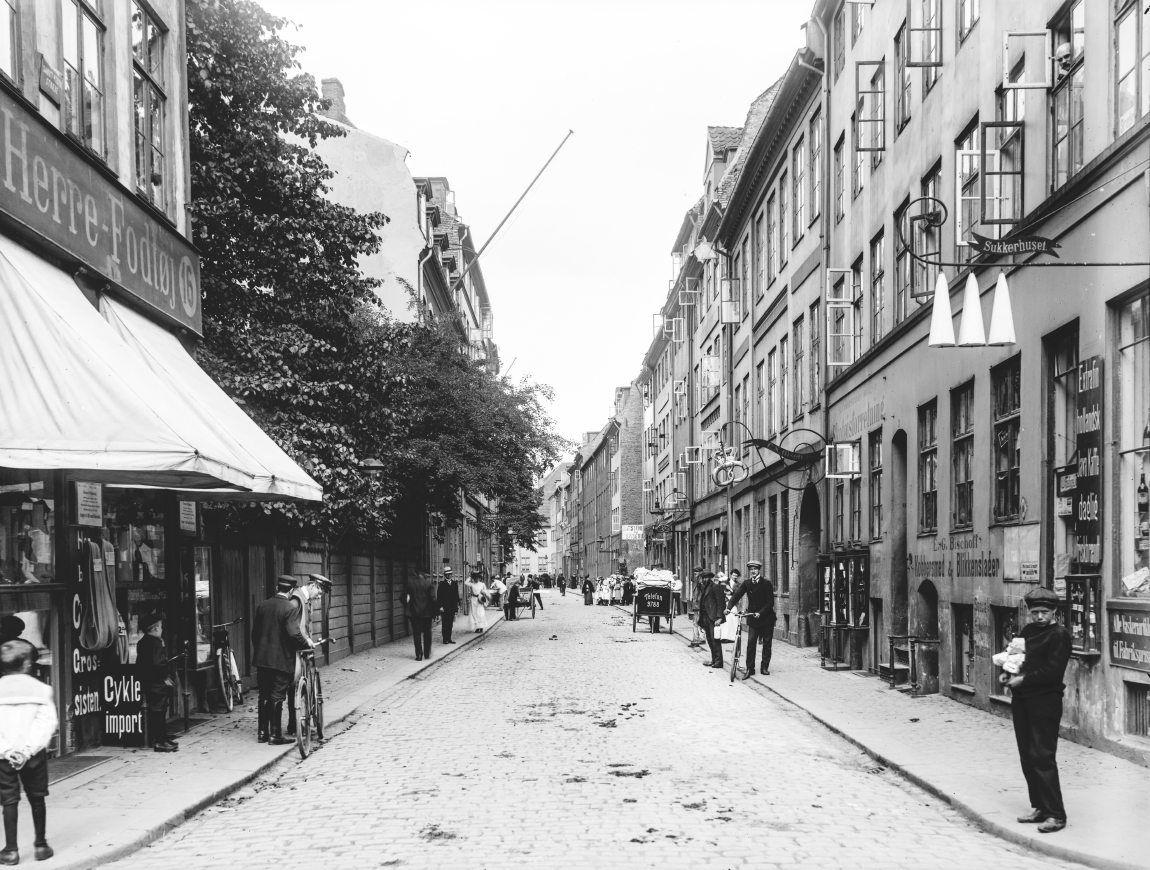
Sankt Peders Stræde

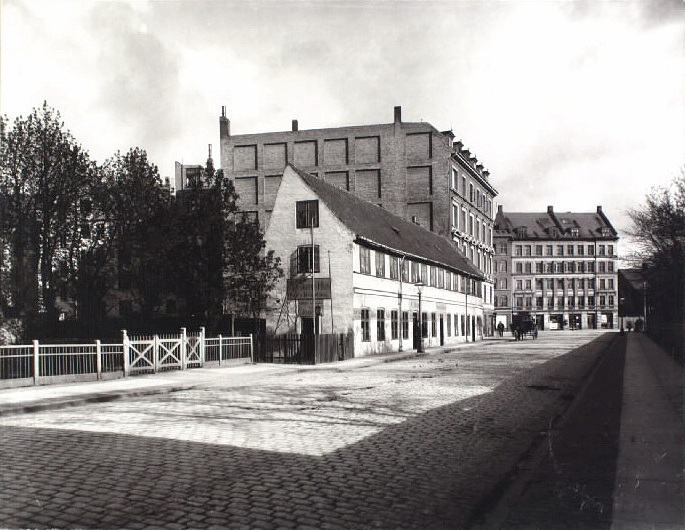
Kalkbrænderivej in Østerbro
