= Dyrkøb =

Street in Copenhagen, Denmark

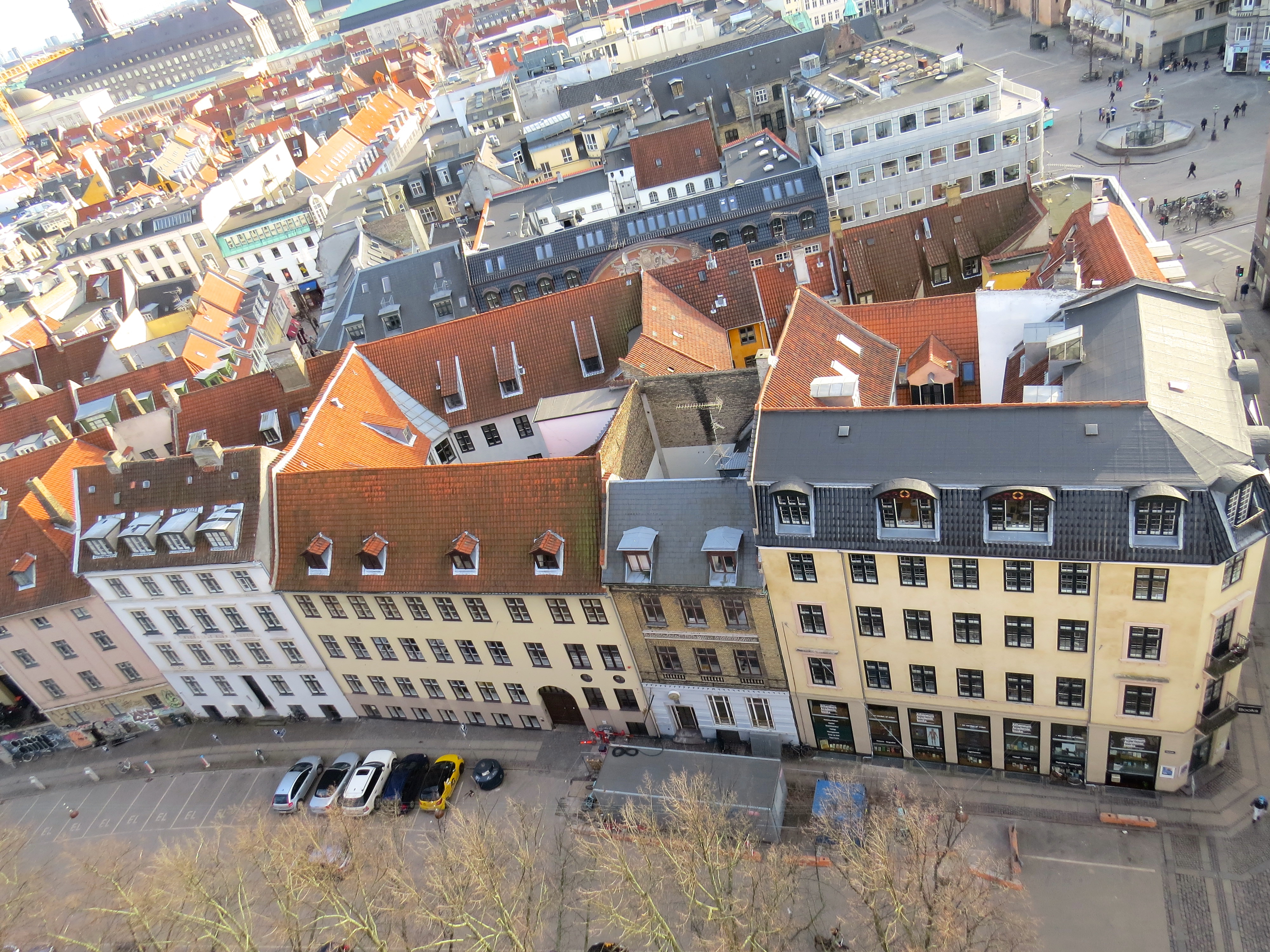
- Dyrkøb seen from the tower of Church of Our Lady
- Length: 98 m (322 ft)
- Location: Indre By, Copenhagen, Denmark
- Postal code: 1166
- Coordinates: 55°40′44.76″N 12°34′22.08″E

Dyrkøb (lit. " Expensive Purchase") is a street in the Old Town of Copenhagen, Denmark. It runs along the south side of Church of Our Lady, linking Nørregade in the west with Fiolstræde in the east. Kunstnerkollegiet, a dormitory from 1815 designed by Christian Frederik Hansen, is located at the corner with Fiolstræde.

== History ==
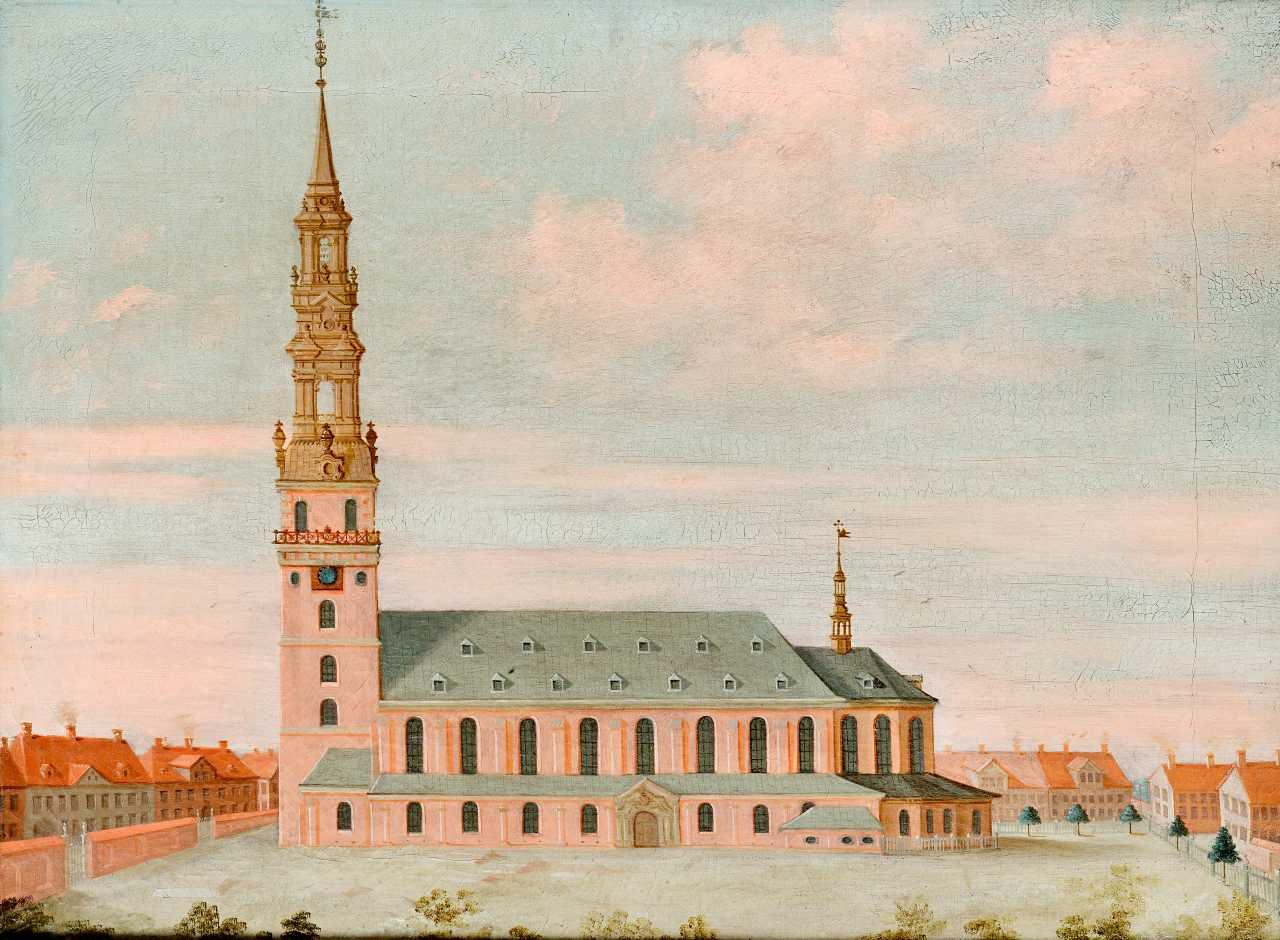
The graveyard of Church of Our Lady where Dyrkøb was later established with Nørregade to the left and Fiolstræde to the right

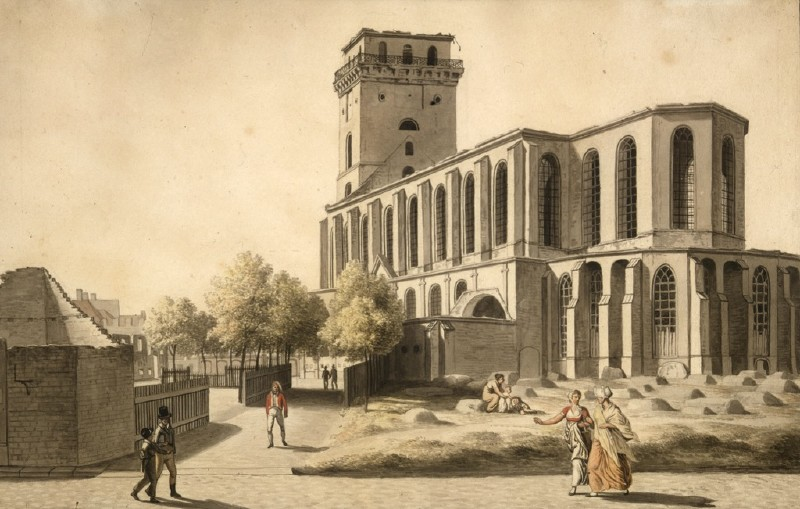
The site in c. 1807 with the destroyed Church of Our Lady1910s

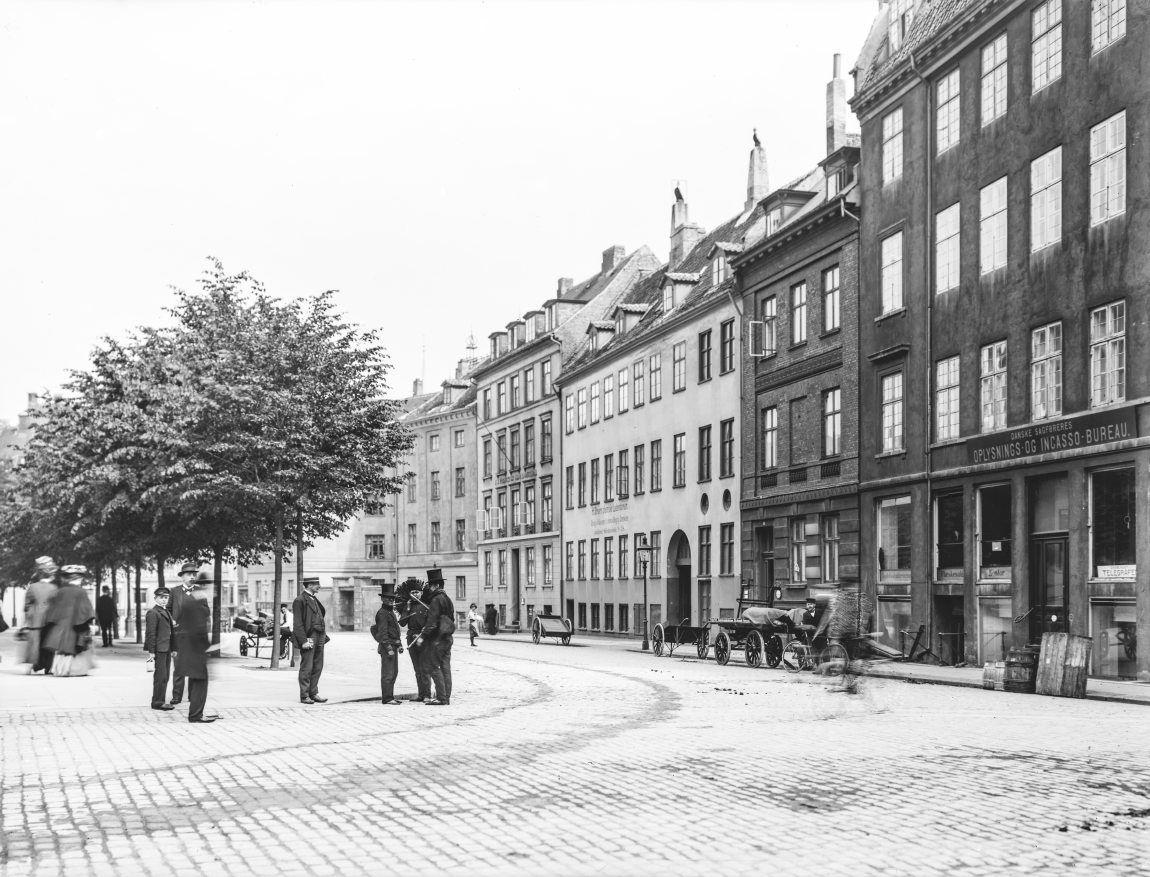
Dyrkøb photographed by Johannes Hauerslev

The street takes its name after a property owned by a wine merchant which was referred to as Dyrkøb in 1622. The reason for the name is unknown but may either be that the wine merchant had acquired the house at a high price or that he sold his wines expensively. The house was later owned by Abraham Lahn but demolished in 1699 to make way for an expansion of Church of Our Lady's graveyard. The graveyard disappeared and the street was established after Assistens Cemetery was established in Nørrebro in 1760. Church of Our Lady and the surrounding buildings were destroyed during the British bombardment of Copenhagen in 1807. The street was rebuilt in the 1810s.

== Notable buildings and residents ==
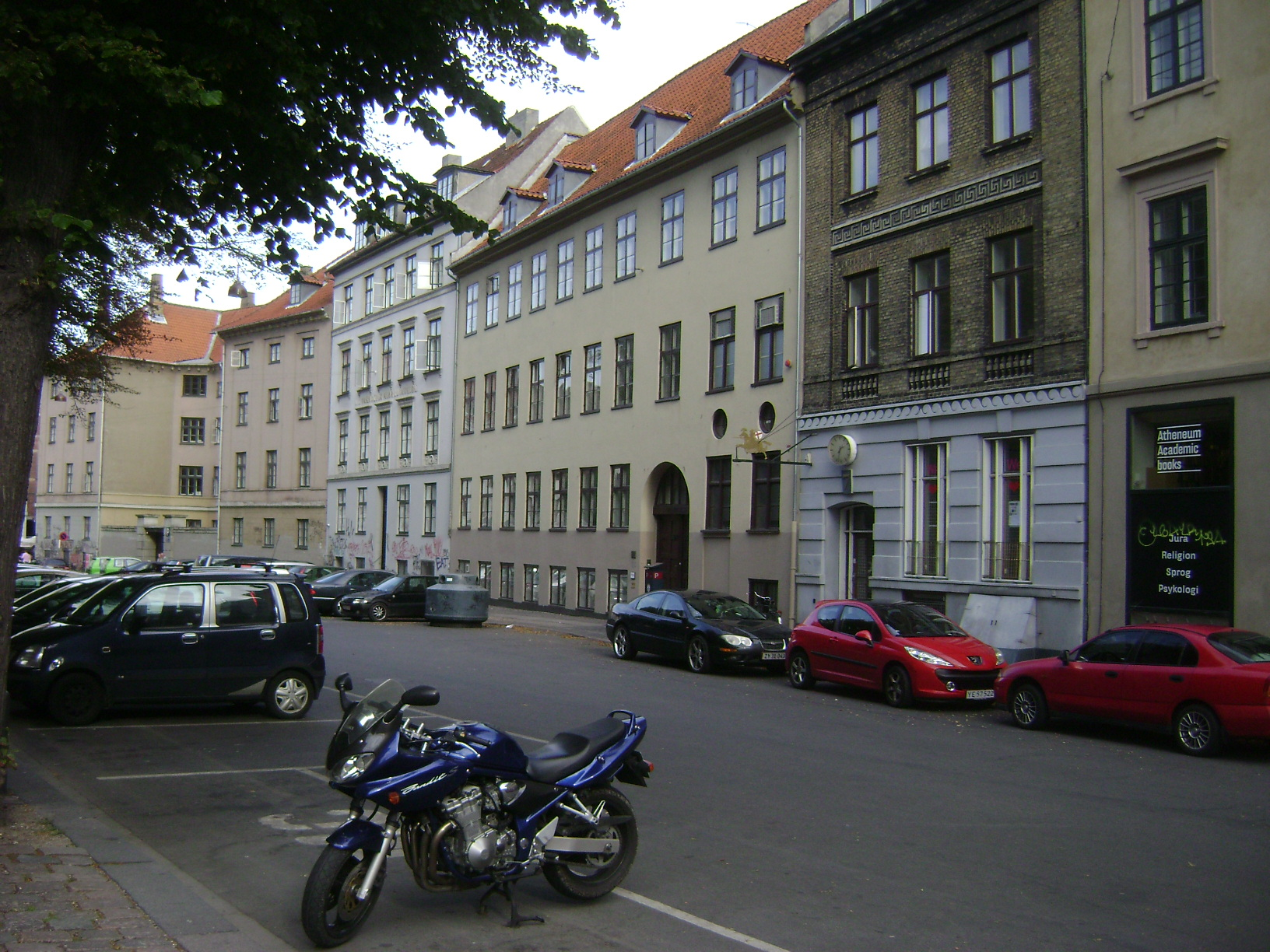
The listed properties at No. 3, 5 and 7

Trøstens Bolig (No. 1), on the corner with Fiolstræde, was built as charitable housing for indigent craftsmen. It was designed by Christian Frederik Hansen who was also in charge of the rebuilding of Church of Our Lady as well as Metropolitan School on the other side of Fiolstræde. In 1854, it was taken over by Soldins Stiftelse and used as charitable housing for indigent widows and unmarried women. The building has since 1974 served as a dormitory for students at the Royal Danish Academy of Fine Arts under the name Kunstnerkollegiet.

Dyrkøb 3-7 are all listed. No. 5 was built in 1812–14 for royal chimney sweeper J. S. Starrinsky. No. 3 was built as one storey in 1813-1814 but expanded with three floors in 1850–51. The 3-bay house at No. 7 is from 1885.

== Public art ==
At the beginning of the street stands a bronze cast of Jean Arp's non-figurative sculpture Cupulate Fruit from 1960. It was installed at the site in 1979 as a gift from Carl Jacobsen's Albertina Foundation.
